= Cirrhilabrus shutmani =

Scientific classification
- Kingdom: Animalia
- Phylum: Chordata
- Class: Actinopterygii
- Order: Labriformes
- Family: Labridae
- Genus: Cirrhilabrus
- Species: C. shutmani

Binomial name
- Cirrhilabrus shutmani Tea & A. C. Gill, 2017

Species of fish

Cirrhilabrus shutmani, also known as the magma fairy wrasse, was discovered by RVS Fishworld in 2016 living around the Didicas Volcano in the Babuyan Islands of the Philippines. The magma wrasse belongs to the family of 'Labridae', a colourful species of tropical and subtropical fish. The magma wrasse is found in tropical coral reef, within the depth range of 50–70 metres (160–230 ft). This species of fish usually inhabits steep slopes around coral reefs made up of loose rubble. It can be purchased within the aquarium trade.

== Etymology ==
Named in honor of Barnett Paul Shutman, RVS Fishworld, a tropical-fish exporter in the Philippines, who provided holotype, paratypes and photos of the species.

== Higher classification: genus Cirrhilabrus ==
Specifically, the magma wrasse belongs to the Cirrhilabrus genus. A genus of very small, very colourful wrasses usually found over rubble bottoms on coral reefs in the Indo-Pacific mostly below 20-30m. Males and females are usually sexually dichromatic and live in small harems comprising a dominant male and a small group of females. The magma fairy wrasse is part of a new wave of recently described fairy wrasses species and brings the total number of species in this group up to 56.

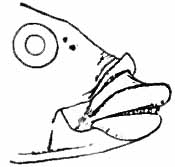
Labridae Drawing

== Discovery ==
Cirrhilabrus shutmani was a new species discovered in August 2016 around the Didicas Volcano, 228m/748ft: found North of Luzon, Philippines, 19.08°N / 122.2°E. The species was affirmed on the basis of four specimens from Didicas Volcano, Babuyan Islands, Cagayan province, northern Philippines. The holotype and three paratypes were collected at a depth of 50-70 meters, along denude rubble slope. Comparatively, Cirrhilabrus shutmani appeared to be closely related to C. blatteus, C. claire, C. earlei, C. jordani, C. lanceolatus, C. roseafascia, C. rubrisquamis and C. sanguineus upon discovery.

== Habitat and behaviour ==
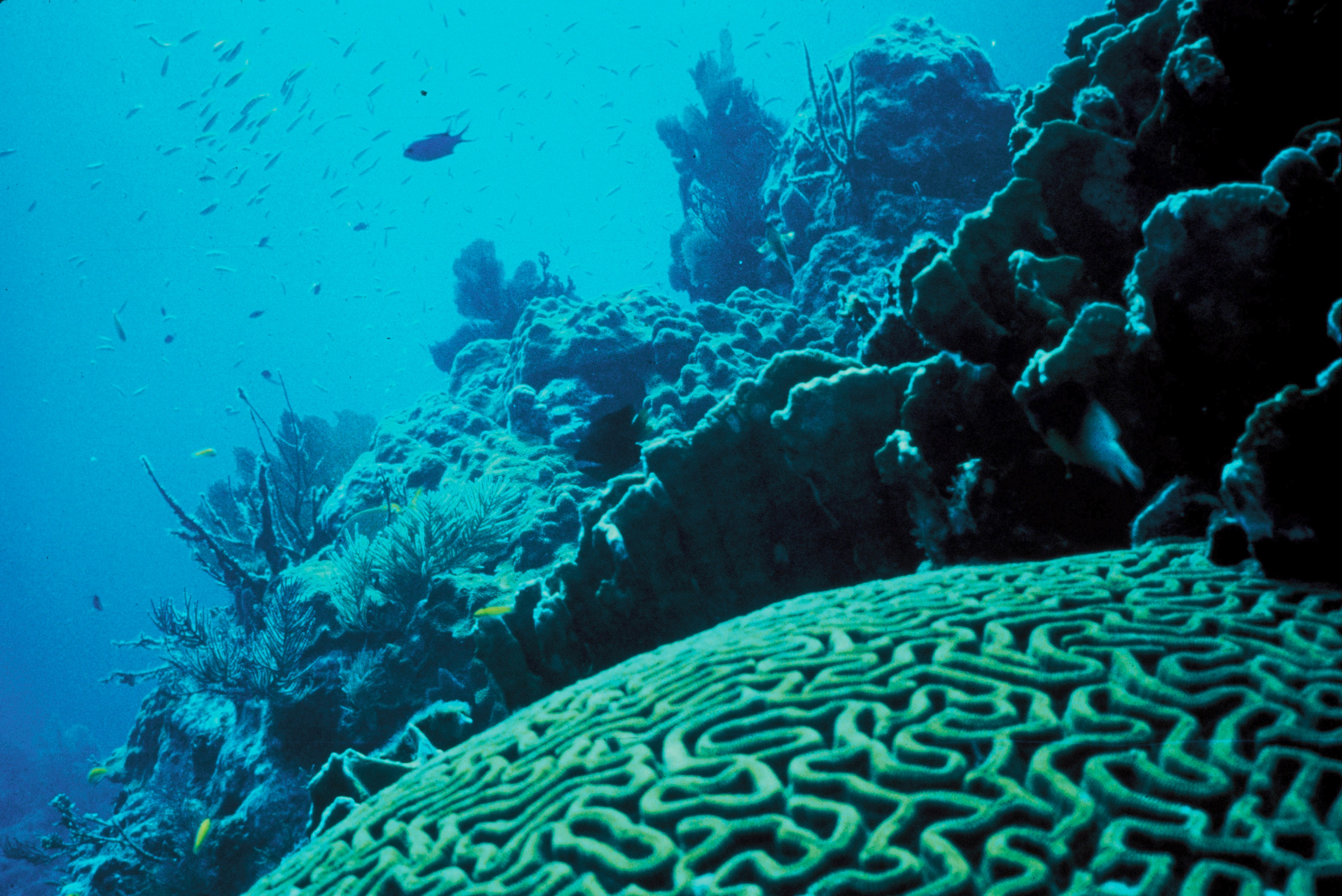
Caguyan Island Reef

The magma wrasse, like most Labrids, occupy areas that include turtlegrass beds, sandy patch reefs, plain sand bottom, coral reefs, and rocky flats. Eating a carnivorous diet consumed mostly of gastropods and bivalves, the magma wrasse utilises its pharyngeal jaws formed by ceratobranchial and pharyngobranchial bones, to crush the shells of its prey. Moreover, the lava colour of the magma wrasse has a survival feature. Like many in its species, wrasses are cryptically coloured to avoid predation and camouflage themselves with their surrounding environments.

== Reproduction ==
The magma fairy wrasse, like other wrasses, have a hermaphroditic sexual nature, being able to change from a female to male, or vice versa, for reproductive purposes. Being a diandric species, there can be both primary and secondary males that exist within the population. Three distinct phases characterise the life cycle of C. shutmani and can be identified through its colour development and sexual organs. Stage one consists of the juvenile phase; stage two, known as the initial phase (IP), can include both sexually mature males and females; lastly, the third phases, known as the terminal phase (TP), which only includes mature males, often having the most colourful displays. TP males often dominate reproductive activity through a harem-based social system. The death of TP males catalyses the IP female sex change in order to maintain reproduction within the ecosphere.

== Lifespan ==
Limited information was found regarding the lifespan of the magma wrasse, let alone the lifespan of wrasses, however, in general, reef species live between three and five years.

== Local Ecosystem ==
The geologic history of Philippines is very complex and has had a tremendous influence on the biota currently found there. Philippine's ecosystems have been distinctly affected by the volcanic activity and friction of the Australian and Asian plates at least 15 million years ago manifesting a continuum of biodiverse features.

The Department of Environment and Natural Resources in Region 2 reported that the based on their initial assessment, the coral reefs and the sea grasses in the province's protected marine biodiversity areas are in good condition.

== Anatomy ==
Cirrhilabrus shutmani shares similar meristic counts to the other species in its complex, but differs from congeners in the following details: upper part of nape dusky red; dorsal and anal fin bright red dusky markings; pelvic fins bright red, dusky, and unmarked; caudal fin bright yellow basally with distal half bright red.

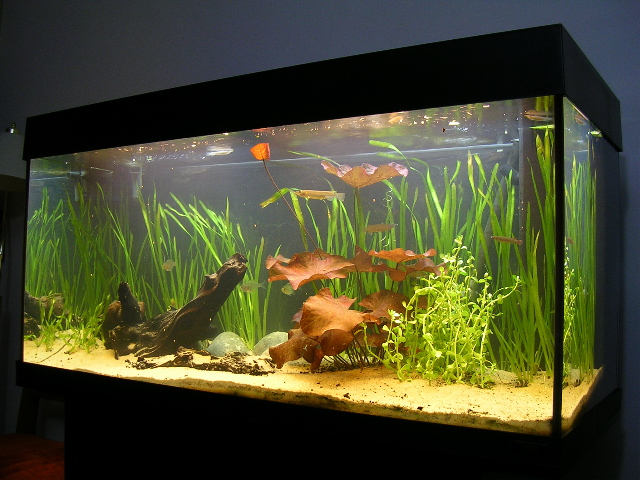
Typical Wrasse Aquarium Setup

== Aquarium ==
The magma fairy wrasse is an available fish for home and public aquariums. To successfully maintain its health, this wrasse requires a carnivorous diet rich in meaty food, such as brine and mysis shrimp, high quality frozen foods, pieces of fresh seafood, and flake and pellet foods. They need to be fed two of three times a day to stay healthy. Furthermore, the Magma Fairy Wrasse adds a diversity of colour and activity in the aquarium. If adding this species of fish, it will likely be a male, since males are predominantly collected over juveniles and females (which are virtually identical in appearance, and therefore difficult for collectors to identify).
