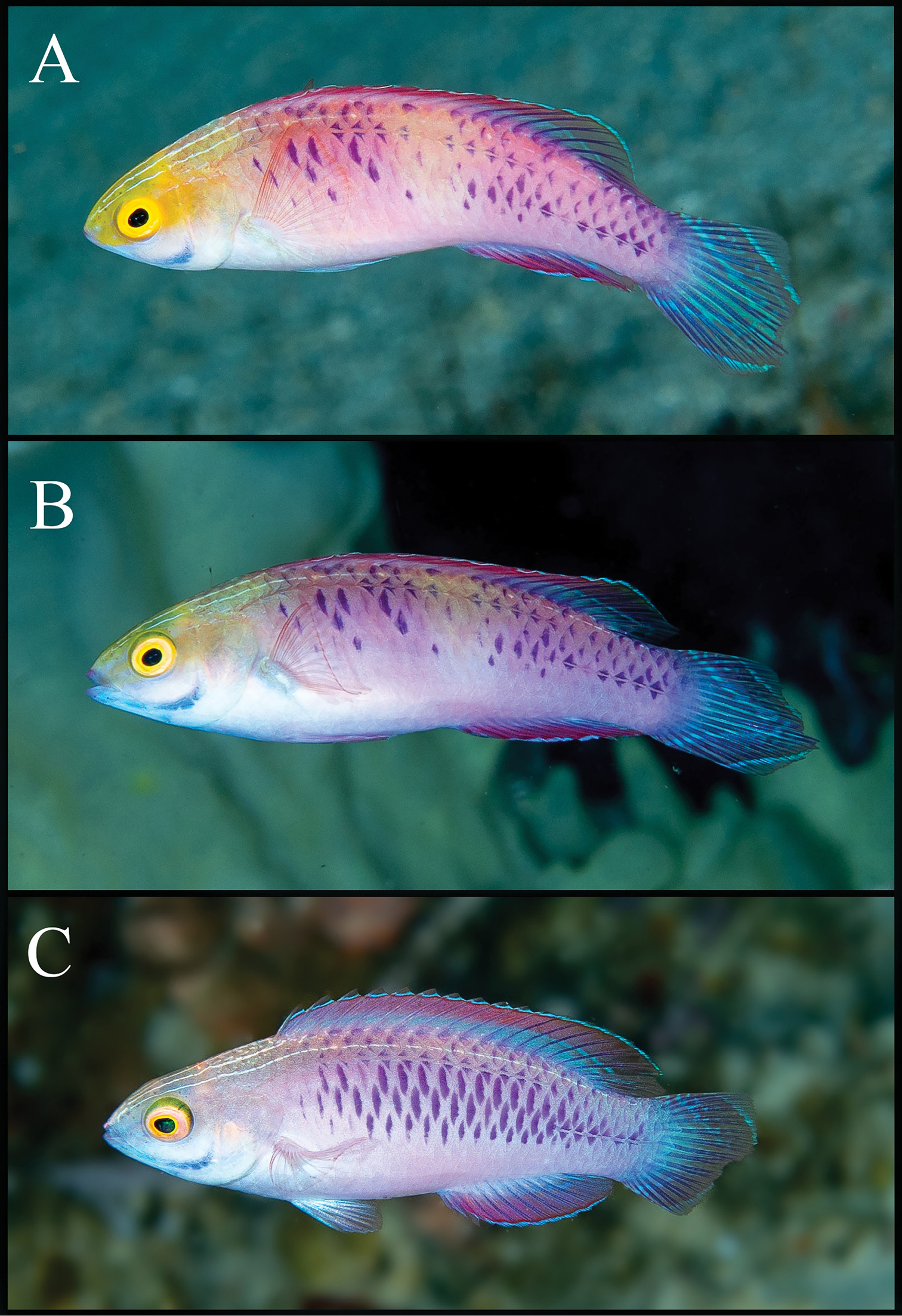
- male (top), transitional (middle), female (bottom)

Scientific classification
- Kingdom: Animalia
- Phylum: Chordata
- Class: Actinopterygii
- Order: Labriformes
- Family: Labridae
- Genus: Cirrhilabrus
- Species: C. wakanda

Binomial name
- Cirrhilabrus wakanda Tea, Pinheiro, Shepherd & L. A. Rocha, 2019

= Cirrhilabrus wakanda =

Species of fairy wrasse

Cirrhilabrus wakanda, the vibranium fairy wrasse, is a species of fairy wrasse from mesophotic reefs at depths of 50–100 m (160–330 ft) in the western Indian Ocean off Tanzania and Mozambique. It was first collected off the coast of Zanzibar, Tanzania by scientists from the California Academy of Sciences. Its separation from the very similar C. rubrisquamis of the Chagos Islands needs confirmation.

== Etymology ==
The species is named after the fictional sovereign state Wakanda from Marvel Comics and the Marvel Cinematic Universe.

== Description ==
Based on a small number of measured specimens, C. wakanda is up to about 7 cm (2.8 in) in standard length. The body is moderately elongated and compressed. Males have yellow heads, with purple and blue bodies. Females and juveniles are very similar. Both sexes have a pair of prominent facial stripes above and below the orbit; and both sexes have notable purple scales and elements that persist and stain purple. A purple chain-link scale pattern is present, resembling the suit worn by the fictional superhero, Black Panther.

== Species comparison ==
In comparison with other closely related species in the genus, the mitochondrial DNA of Cirrhilabrus wakanda differs from C. rubrisquamis by 0.6%, from C. blatteus by 1.9%, and from C. sanguineus by 1.5%. Small genetic differences between closely related fairy wrasses are not unusual. A later review found that the "C. rubrisquamis" used for comparison were from the population found to be a separate species, C. finifenmaa, in 2022. Consequently, a detailed, direct comparison with true C. rubrisquamis is lacking, but their appearance is very similar and it is possible that C. wakanda is a junior synonym of C. rubrisquamis.
