= Cirrhilabrus ryukyuensis =

Conservation status
- Least Concern (IUCN 3.1)

Scientific classification
- Kingdom: Animalia
- Phylum: Chordata
- Class: Actinopterygii
- Order: Labriformes
- Family: Labridae
- Genus: Cirrhilabrus
- Species: C. ryukyuensis

Binomial name
- Cirrhilabrus ryukyuensis Ishikawa, 1904

Species of fish

Cirrhilabrus ryukyuensis is a wrasse from the western Pacific Ocean from Indonesia, Malaysia and the Philippines north to Japan. It occasionally makes its way into the aquarium trade. It grows to a size of 15 cm (5.9 in) in length. Some authorities regard this taxon as a synonym of Cirrhilabrus cyanopleura, but FishBase and the Catalog of Fishes treat it as a valid species. This species was at times called Cirrhilabrus lyukyuensis, but this is treated as a misspelling.
