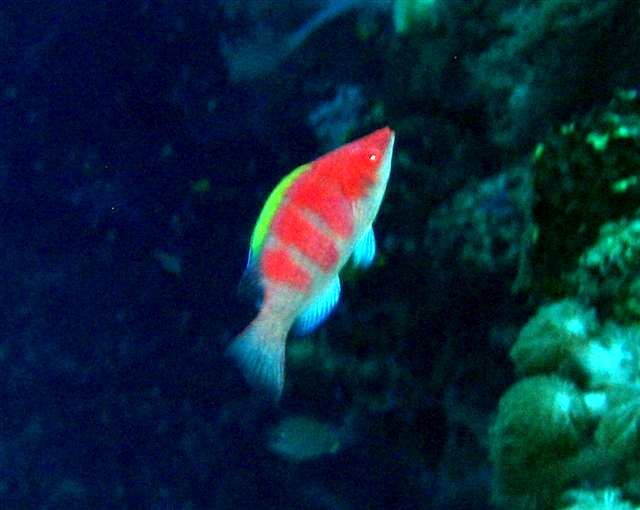

Conservation status
- Least Concern (IUCN 3.1)

Scientific classification
- Kingdom: Animalia
- Phylum: Chordata
- Class: Actinopterygii
- Order: Labriformes
- Family: Labridae
- Genus: Cirrhilabrus
- Species: C. flavidorsalis

Binomial name
- Cirrhilabrus flavidorsalis J. E. Randall & K. E. Carpenter, 1980

= Yellowfin fairy-wrasse =

Species of fish

The yellowfin fairy-wrasse (Cirrhilabrus flavidorsalis) is a species of wrasse native to the western Pacific Ocean from Indonesia to the Philippines and Palau. It inhabits coral reefs, living in groups among the branches of branching coral. It can be found at depths from 6 to 40 m (20 to 131 ft), though rarely deeper than 28 m (92 ft). This species can reach a total length of 6.5 cm (2.6 in).
