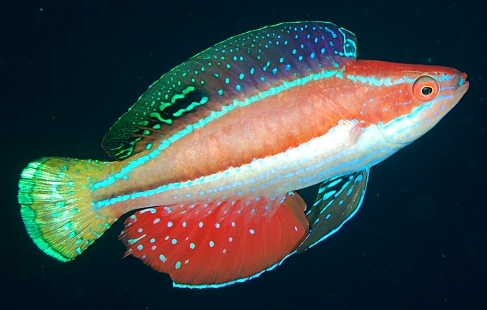
- Cirrhilabrus katoi

Scientific classification
- Kingdom: Animalia
- Phylum: Chordata
- Class: Actinopterygii
- Order: Labriformes
- Family: Labridae
- Subfamily: Cirrhilabrinae
- Genus: Cirrhilabrus; Temminck & Schlegel, 1845

Type species
- Cirrhilabrus temminckii Bleeker, 1853

Synonyms
- Cheilinoides Bleeker, 1851; Cirrhilabrichthys Klausewitz, 1976; Neocirrhilabrus Cheng & Wang, 1979

= Cirrhilabrus =

Genus of fishes

Cirrhilabrus, the fairy wrasses, is a genus of fish in the family Labridae native to coral reefs and nearby habitats in the Indo-Pacific region. They are brightly colored and do not surpass 16 cm (6.3 in) in length. Males are larger and more colorful than females. They are commonly kept in aquaria.

== Species ==
There are currently more than 60 recognized species in this genus:

Species	Common name	Image
Cirrhilabrus adornatus J. E. Randall & Kunzmann, 1998	Red-fin fairy-wrasse	
Cirrhilabrus africanus Victor, 2016	African long-fin fairy-wrasse	
Cirrhilabrus apterygia (G. R. Allen, 1983)	Mutant wrasse	
Cirrhilabrus aquamarinus Tea, G. R. Allen & Dailami, 2021		
Cirrhilabrus aurantidorsalis G. R. Allen & Kuiter, 1999	Orangeback fairy-wrasse	
Cirrhilabrus balteatus J. E. Randall, 1988	Girdled fairy-wrasse	
Cirrhilabrus bathyphilus J. E. Randall & Nagareda, 2002	Deep-water fairy-wrasse	
Cirrhilabrus beauperryi G. R. Allen, Drew & Barber, 2008	Beau's fairy-wrasse	
Cirrhilabrus blatteus V. G. Springer & J. E. Randall, 1974	Purple-boned fairy-wrasse	
Cirrhilabrus briangreenei Tea, Pyle and Rocha, 2020		
Cirrhilabrus brunneus G. R. Allen, 2006	Dusky fairy-wrasse	
Cirrhilabrus cenderawasih G. R. Allen & Erdmann, 2006	Cenderawasih fairy-wrasse	
Cirrhilabrus chaliasi Tea, G. R. Allen & Dailami, 2021		
Cirrhilabrus claire J. E. Randall & Pyle, 2001	Claire's fairy-wrasse	
Cirrhilabrus condei G. R. Allen & J. E. Randall, 1996	Conde's fairy-wrasse	
Cirrhilabrus cyanogularis Tea, Frable & A. C. Gill, 2018	Blue-throated fairy-wrasse	
Cirrhilabrus cyanopleura (Bleeker, 1851)	Blueside wrasse	
Cirrhilabrus earlei J. E. Randall & Pyle, 2001	Orange-striped fairy-wrasse	
Cirrhilabrus efatensis F. Walsh, Tea & Tanaka, 2017	hooded fairy-wrasse	
Cirrhilabrus exquisitus J. L. B. Smith, 1957	Exquisite fairy-wrasse	
Cirrhilabrus filamentosus (Klausewitz, 1976)	Whip-fin fairy-wrasse	
Cirrhilabrus finifenmaa Tea, Najeeb, Rowlett & Rocha, 2022	Rose-veiled fairy wrasse	
Cirrhilabrus flavidorsalis J. E. Randall & K. E. Carpenter, 1980	Yellow-fin fairy-wrasse	
Cirrhilabrus humanni G. R. Allen & Erdmann, 2012	Humann's fairy-wrasse	
Cirrhilabrus hygroxerus G. R. Allen & M. P. Hammer, 2016	Monsoon fairy-wrasse	
Cirrhilabrus isosceles Y. K. Tea, Senou & Greene, 2016	Pin-tail fairy-wrasse	
Cirrhilabrus joanallenae G. R. Allen, 2000	Joan's fairy-wrasse	
Cirrhilabrus johnsoni J. E. Randall, 1988	Johnson's fairy-wrasse	
Cirrhilabrus jordani Snyder, 1904	Flame fairy-wrasse	
Cirrhilabrus katherinae J. E. Randall, 1992	Katherine's fairy-wrasse	
Cirrhilabrus katoi Senou & Hirata, 2000		
Cirrhilabrus laboutei J. E. Randall & Lubbock, 1982	Laboute's fairy-wrasse	
Cirrhilabrus lanceolatus J. E. Randall & H. Masuda, 1991	Long-tailed fairy-wrasse	
Cirrhilabrus lineatus J. E. Randall & Lubbock, 1982	Purple-lined fairy-wrasse	
Cirrhilabrus lubbocki J. E. Randall & K. E. Carpenter, 1980	Lubbock's fairy-wrasse	
Cirrhilabrus lunatus J. E. Randall & H. Masuda, 1991		
Cirrhilabrus luteovittatus J. E. Randall, 1988	Yellow-band fairy-wrasse	
Cirrhilabrus marinda G. R. Allen, Erdmann & Dailami, 2015	Sail-fin fairy-wrasse	
Cirrhilabrus marjorie G. R. Allen, J. E. Randall & B. A. Carlson, 2003	Marjorie's fairy-wrasse	
Cirrhilabrus melanomarginatus J. E. Randall & S. C. Shen, 1978	Black-fin fairy-wrasse	
Cirrhilabrus morrisoni G. R. Allen, 1999	Morrison's fairy-wrasse	
Cirrhilabrus nahackyi F. M. Walsh & H. Tanaka, 2012	Nahacky's fairy-wrasse	
Cirrhilabrus naokoae J. E. Randall & H. Tanaka, 2009	Naoko's fairy-wrasse	
Cirrhilabrus punctatus J. E. Randall & Kuiter, 1989	Dotted fairy-wrasse	
Cirrhilabrus pylei G. R. Allen & J. E. Randall, 1996	Pyle's fairy-wrasse	
Cirrhilabrus randalli G. R. Allen, 1995	Randall's fairy-wrasse	
Cirrhilabrus rhomboidalis J. E. Randall,	Rhomboid fairy-wrasse	
Cirrhilabrus roseafascia J. E. Randall & Lubbock, 1982	Pink-banded fairy-wrasse	
Cirrhilabrus rubeus Victor, 2016	Ruby long-fin fairy-wrasse	
Cirrhilabrus rubrimarginatus J. E. Randall, 1992	Red-margined fairy-wrasse	
Cirrhilabrus rubripinnis J. E. Randall & K. E. Carpenter, 1980	Redfin wrasse	
Cirrhilabrus rubrisquamis J. E. Randall & Emery, 1983	Rosy-scales fairy-wrasse	
Cirrhilabrus rubriventralis V. G. Springer & J. E. Randall, 1974	Long-fin fairy-wrasse	
Cirrhilabrus ryukyuensis Ishikawa, 1904		
Cirrhilabrus sanguineus Cornic, 1987	Red-blotched fairy-wrasse	
Cirrhilabrus scottorum J. E. Randall & R. M. Pyle, 1989	Scott's fairy-wrasse	
Cirrhilabrus shutmani Tea & A. C. Gill, 2017	Magma fairy-wrasse	
Cirrhilabrus solorensis Bleeker 1853	Red-eye fairy-wrasse	
Cirrhilabrus squirei F. M. Walsh, 2014	Squire's fairy-wrasse	
Cirrhilabrus temminckii Bleeker, 1853	Thread-fin fairy-wrasse	
Cirrhilabrus tonozukai G. R. Allen & Kuiter, 1999	Tono's fairy-wrasse	
Cirrhilabrus wakanda Tea, Pinheiro, Shepherd & Rocha, 2019	Vibranium fairy wrasse	
Cirrhilabrus walindi G. R. Allen & J. E. Randall, 1996	Walindi fairy-wrasse	
Cirrhilabrus walshi J. E. Randall & Pyle, 2001		
