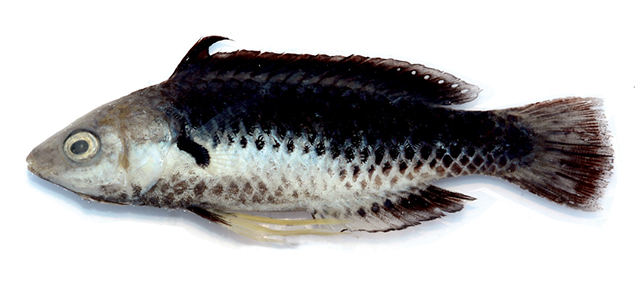

Scientific classification
- Domain: Eukaryota
- Kingdom: Animalia
- Phylum: Chordata
- Class: Actinopterygii
- Order: Labriformes
- Family: Labridae
- Genus: Cirrhilabrus
- Species: C. hygroxerus

Binomial name
- Cirrhilabrus hygroxerus Allen & Hammer, 2016

= Monsoon fairy-wrasse =

Species of fish

The monsoon fairy-wrasse (Cirrhilabrus hygroxerus) is a species of fish in the wrasse family, originating from the eastern Timor Sea. It matures at a length between 5 and 6 cm (2.0 and 2.4 in). They can be found at a depth of around 20 metres (66 ft). It is described from 19 type specimens. The species complex consists of five other Indo-Pacific species: Cirrhilabrus joanallenae (western Sumatra), Cirrhilabrus humanni (western Lesser Sunda Islands of Indonesia), Cirrhilabrus morrisoni (Hibernia Reef, western Timor Sea), Cirrhilabrus naokoae (Nias Island, western Sumatra), and Cirrhilabrus rubriventralis (Red Sea, western Indian Ocean, Maldives, and Sri Lanka). Cirrhilabrus morrisoni and new Cirrhilabrus humanni relatively new adjoining natural ranges with Cirrhilabrus hygroxerus. The Australian version of Cirrhilabrus hygroxerus has bright white ventral part in its body and the rest of the female monsoon wrasses.
