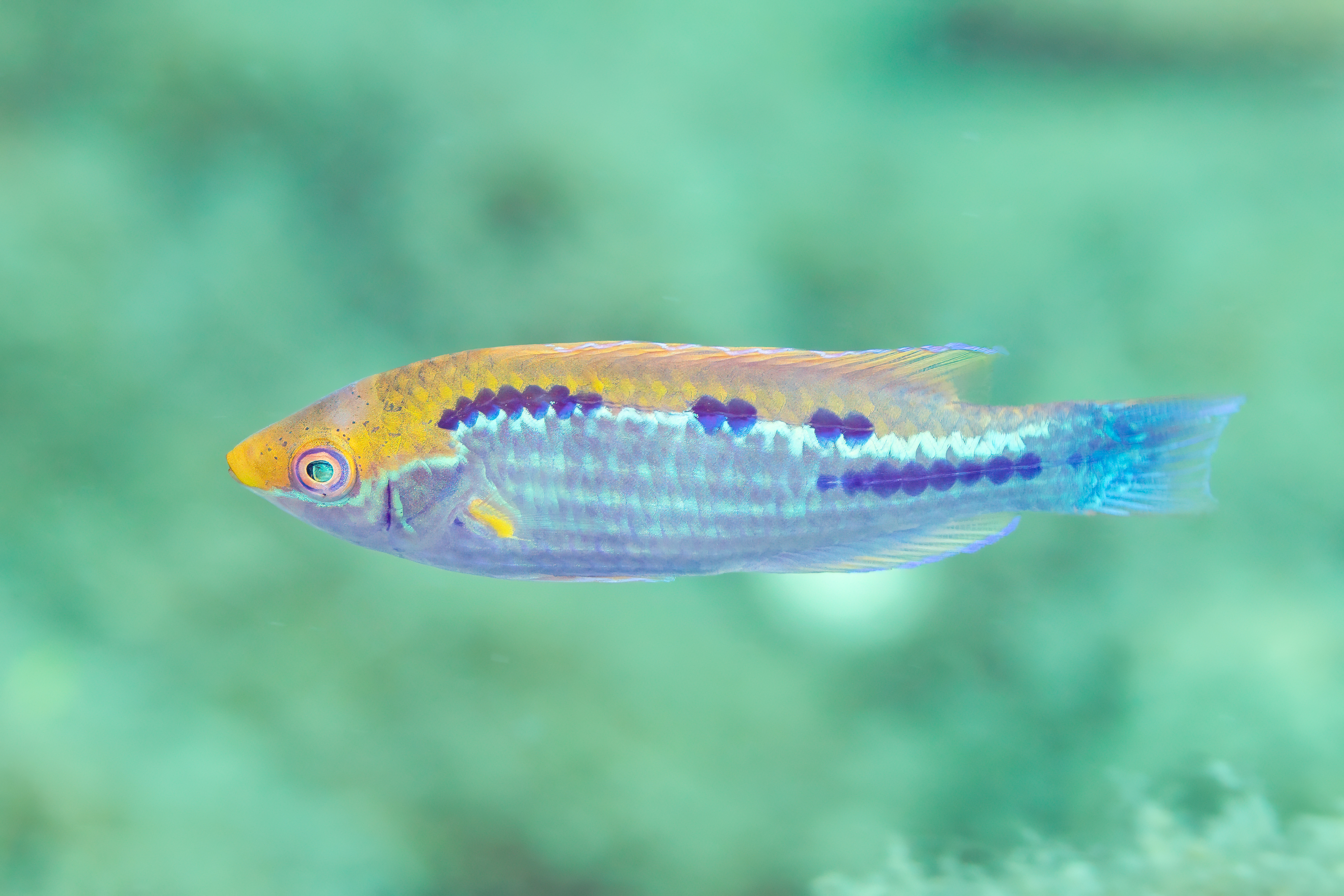

Conservation status
- Least Concern (IUCN 3.1)

Scientific classification
- Kingdom: Animalia
- Phylum: Chordata
- Class: Actinopterygii
- Order: Labriformes
- Family: Labridae
- Genus: Cirrhilabrus
- Species: C. lubbocki

Binomial name
- Cirrhilabrus lubbocki J. E. Randall & K. E. Carpenter, 1980

= Lubbock's wrasse =

Species of fish

Lubbock's wrasse (Cirrhilabrus lubbocki) is a species of wrasse native to coral reefs of the Philippines and the island of Sulawesi in Indonesia, though it also has been claimed to be present in Malaysia, Japan, and Palau. It can be found at depths from 4 to 45 m (13 to 148 ft), though rarely deeper than 30 m (98 ft). This species can reach a total length of 8 cm (3.1 in). It can be found in the aquarium trade.

Named in honor of Hugh Roger Lubbock (1951–1981), marine biologist, who obtained the first specimen and suspected that it represented an undescribed species.
