= Redfin wrasse =

Conservation status
- Least Concern (IUCN 3.1)

Scientific classification
- Kingdom: Animalia
- Phylum: Chordata
- Class: Actinopterygii
- Order: Labriformes
- Family: Labridae
- Genus: Cirrhilabrus
- Species: C. rubripinnis

Binomial name
- Cirrhilabrus rubripinnis J. E. Randall & Carpenter, 1980

Species of fish

The redfin wrasse (Cirrhilabrus rubripinnis) is a species of wrasse native to the coral reefs of Indonesia and Philippines. It occurs at depths from 2 to 40 m (6.6 to 131.2 ft). This species can reach a total length of 9.1 cm (3.6 in). It can be found in the aquarium trade.
