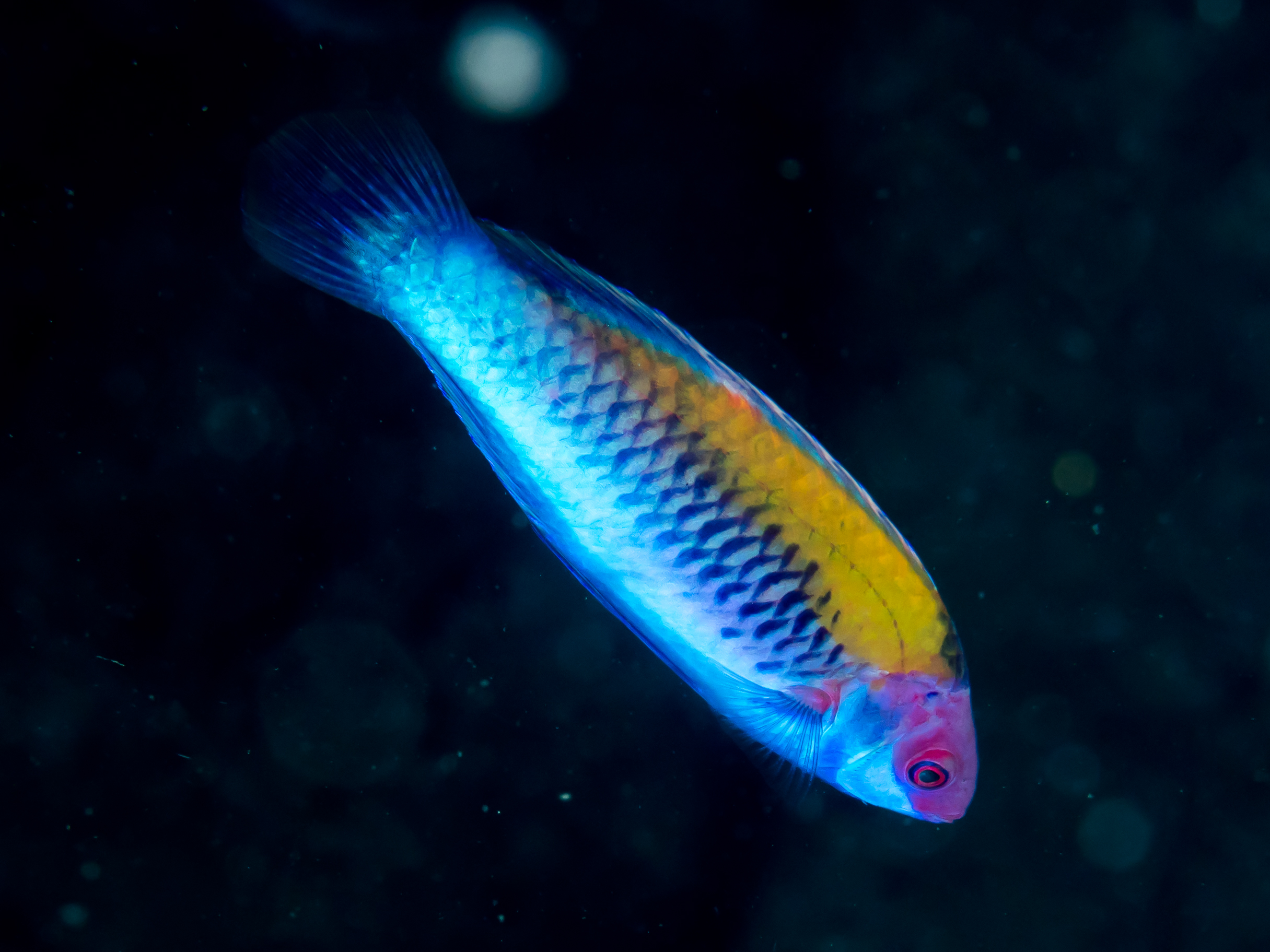
- Cirrhilabrus aurantidorsalis at Lembeh, Indonesia

Conservation status
- Least Concern (IUCN 3.1)

Scientific classification
- Kingdom: Animalia
- Phylum: Chordata
- Class: Actinopterygii
- Order: Labriformes
- Family: Labridae
- Genus: Cirrhilabrus
- Species: C. aurantidorsalis

Binomial name
- Cirrhilabrus aurantidorsalis G. R. Allen & Kuiter, 1999

= Orangeback fairy-wrasse =

Species of fish

The orangeback fairy-wrasse (Cirrhilabrus aurantidorsalis) is a species of wrasse endemic to Lembeh and the Tomini Bay in northern Sulawesi in Indonesia. It inhabits coral reefs and can be found at depths from 10 to 25 m (33 to 82 ft). This species can reach a total length of 10 cm (3.9 in). It can be found in the marine aquarium trade.

The orangeback fairy wrasses are like many wrasses in that they live in harems of many females in a group with only one male. The male is the dominant fish with the stronger colors and traits. There have been no small males that have been recorded so it is believed that all orangeback fairy wrasses' begin as females and then some females transform into males. Fairy wrasses eat mainly zooplankton; they have pair of teeth in the front and a set of teeth wrapped around the side which is used to break down their food.
