= Beau's wrasse =

Conservation status
- Least Concern (IUCN 3.1)

Scientific classification
- Kingdom: Animalia
- Phylum: Chordata
- Class: Actinopterygii
- Order: Labriformes
- Family: Labridae
- Genus: Cirrhilabrus
- Species: C. beauperryi

Binomial name
- Cirrhilabrus beauperryi Allen, Drew & Barber, 2008

Species of fish

Beau's wrasse (Cirrhilabrus beauperryi) is a species of wrasse native to the western Pacific Ocean. This species can reach a standard length of 8.5 cm (3.3 in). It can be found at depths from 5 to 32 m (16 to 105 ft), most often between 6 and 12 m (20 and 39 ft). Its coloration varies, ranging from light blue to pink. It can be found in the aquarium trade.

== Etymology ==
The specific name honours Beau Perry, the son of Claire and Noel Perry who support Conservation International,
