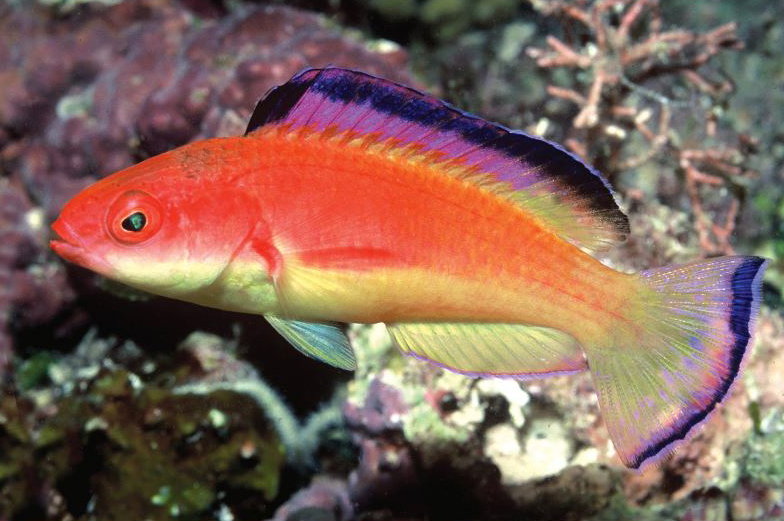

Conservation status
- Least Concern (IUCN 3.1)

Scientific classification
- Kingdom: Animalia
- Phylum: Chordata
- Class: Actinopterygii
- Order: Labriformes
- Family: Labridae
- Genus: Cirrhilabrus
- Species: C. bathyphilus

Binomial name
- Cirrhilabrus bathyphilus Randall & Nagareda, 2002

= Deepwater wrasse =

Species of fish

The deepwater wrasse (Cirrhilabrus bathyphilus) is a species of wrasse native to the Pacific Ocean. It inhabits coral reefs and it can be found at depths from 60 to 217 m (197 to 712 ft). This species can reach a standard length of 7.6 cm (3.0 in). It can be found in the aquarium trade.
