= Mutant wrasse =

Conservation status
- Vulnerable (IUCN 3.1)

Scientific classification
- Kingdom: Animalia
- Phylum: Chordata
- Class: Actinopterygii
- Order: Labriformes
- Family: Labridae
- Genus: Cirrhilabrus
- Species: C. apterygia

Binomial name
- Cirrhilabrus apterygia (G. R. Allen, 1983)

Synonyms
- Conniella apterygia

Species of fish

The mutant wrasse (Cirrhilabrus apterygia), also known as Connie's wrasse, is a species of wrasse only known to occur in Australia's Rowley Shoals at depths from 30 to 40 m (100 to 130 ft). This species grows to a total length of 8 cm (3.1 in). This species is sometimes classified in the monotypic genus Conniella. This unusual wrasse lacks pelvic fins and the males have a long, pointed tail.
