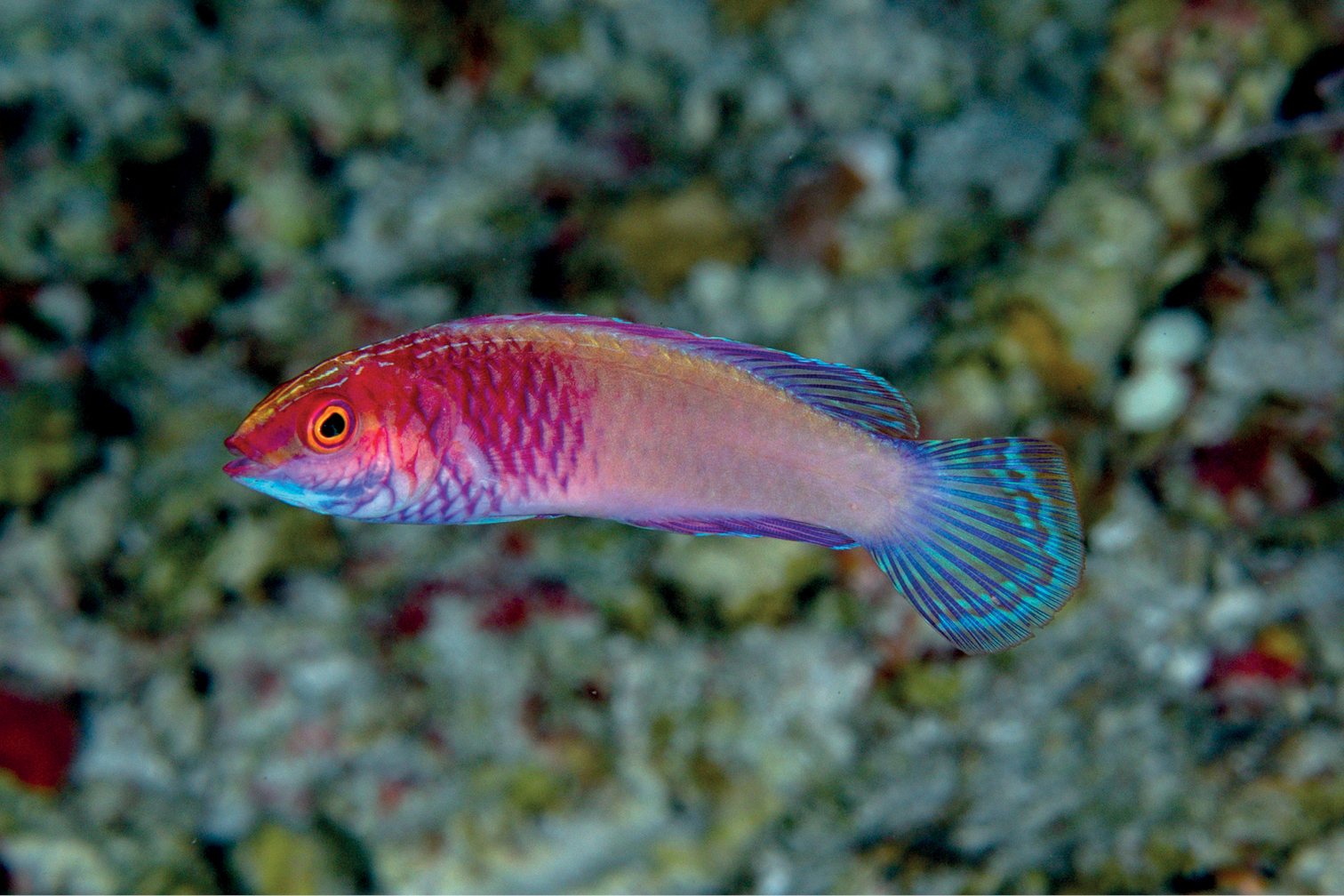

Scientific classification
- Kingdom: Animalia
- Phylum: Chordata
- Class: Actinopterygii
- Order: Labriformes
- Family: Labridae
- Genus: Cirrhilabrus
- Species: C. finifenmaa

Binomial name
- Cirrhilabrus finifenmaa Tea, Najeeb, Rowlett & Rocha, 2022

= Cirrhilabrus finifenmaa =

Rose-veiled fairy wrasse

Species of fish

Cirrhilabrus finifenmaa, also known by its common name rose-veiled fairy wrasse, is a rainbow-colored wrasse that is native to the reefs of the Maldives.

== Discovery and etymology ==
C. finifenmaa was spotted by John Ernest Randall in 1983 and was initially thought to be an adult version of C. rubrisquamis, a fish from the Chagos Archipelago island chain. The researchers who described C. finifenmaa suggested that C. rubrisquamis may be synonymous with C. wakanda.

C. finifenmaa was first described as a separate species in 2022 by a team of researchers from the University of Sydney, the Maldives Marine Research Institute (MMRI), the Field Museum, and the California Academy of Sciences as part of the Hope for Reefs project. Ahmed Najeeb, a biologist at the MMRI, co-authored the paper announcing the discovery, making him the first Maldivian to describe a new species. The species is named after the Dhivehi word finifenmaa, meaning rose, due to its coloration.

== Description ==
C. finifenmaa is a teleost that belongs to the Labridae family, one of the most diverse families of fishes in the world. Fossils from this family are present off the coast of Italy dating back from the Eocene period. However, others argue that Labridae could be as old at 90 million years.

Cirrhilabrus finifenmaa individuals have ornate colors: the anterior body is magenta, the central region is dark purple, and the posterior body is an orange-pink color. Fins are a mix of purple and blue hues. The lateral line is interrupted and is composed of 22-26 porous scales. Members of this group have scales with a crosshatched pattern present in the anterior body. The tenth to eleventh dorsal-fin spine is the longest. Scales are present on the magenta anterior body, particularly on the chest and isthmus. The scales are cycloid. Nearly all the soft rays are branched. There are fifteen rays on the pectoral fins. Members of this species have small mouths with the maxilla nearly contacting the orbit. C. finifenmaa individuals have three pairs of teeth on the upper jaw and one pair on the lower jaw. In males, the interspinous membranes of the dorsal fins extend beyond dorsal-fin spines. The caudal fin is rounded, and the pectoral fins are short. Male and female specimens differ slightly in color. This species can be distinguished from similar ones in having a round caudal fin, crosshatch marks on the chest, and unmarked scales on the posterior body.

== Distribution ==
Cirrhilabrus finifenmaa individuals are found at a depth of around 50 meters in warm mesophotic coral ecosystems. Mesophotic coral systems have photosynthetic organisms like algae and coral; they also occur at depths of around 30 to 150 meters in tropical and subtropical regions. However, researchers believe that members of this newly described species are likely present in deeper waters since C. finifenmaa often inhabit loose coral bottom waters.

This new species belongs to the Cirrhilabrus jordani species complex, which is a group of fairy wrasses that form a clade within the Indian Ocean. Species belonging to this complex are often distributed across the Indo-Pacific.

== Development ==
Little is known about the development of this species. As described previously, male individuals of Cirrhilabrus finifenmaa develop bright coloration as they age, with the pigment of the whole body dimming off towards the posterior end. Females and juveniles are visually similar to males. However, the progression from bright head to less pigmented posterior body is less prominent. Juveniles have even less color, and the head is more pink than magenta before developing into adults. It is difficult to distinguish juveniles from females based on the color gradient. Members of the genus Cirrhilabrus often have fine stripes that appear in adulthood. Perhaps this characteristic could be sufficient to distinguish juveniles from adults of this new species.

== Reproduction ==
Very little is known about the reproduction of Cirrhilabrus finifenmaa. However, it has been observed in the general Cirrhilabrus genus. Each male territory is composed of one or two female herds. Each herd comprises 5 to 40 female individuals. Females do move between male territories. Cirrhilabrus follows a promiscuous mating system in which multiple matings of both sexes without any apparent pair bonding occurs. Previously, it was observed that spawning occurs from July to September, but some scientists argue it can happen year-round.

Courtship behavior begins a few hours prior to spawning. Males will flash, rush, and loop. When flashing, a male will swim in proximity to a female while rapidly fluttering his caudal fin. Body color also changes. Rushing will then ensue where a male suddenly veers towards a female from the rear. Lastly, looping begins. Looping is when the male quickly ascends and descends, and then spawning occurs. Researchers observed that members of Cirrhilabrus do not group spawn; they pair spawn. During spawning, a male quickly approaches a female from behind, and together they dash upwards, reverse direction, and return to the herd. Eggs and sperm are released at the height of ascent, and this occurs quickly. Members of the Labridae family produce about thirty to a few thousand eggs per female. Afterwards, the male will continue courting other females. These individuals are broadcast spawners, so parental investment is unlikely.

Interestingly, streaking and sneaking were observed in the Cirrhilabrus genus. Sneaking occurs when a nonterritorial smaller male individually spawns with the females in the vicinity of the territorial larger male. Streaking occurs when a male also releases his sperm when another male and female are at the apex of spawning.

== Life span/longevity ==
Little is known about Cirrhilabrus finifenmaa longevity, but previous studies taken at the Great Barrier Reef found that members of the Cirrhilabrus genus had a 50% chance of living to 1.6 years and a 10% chance of living for 2.3 years. It was also found that Cirrhilabrus had one of the highest mortality rates for juveniles and adults, but members could live up to four or five years for small reef species.

== Behavior ==
While little is known about the behavior of the Cirrhilabrus finifenmaa species, behavior of other species of the Cirrhilabrus genus has been described. Individuals of Cirrhilabrus often live in harmony with other species but can be frightened easily. Fishes are either territorial males, nonterritorial males, or females. Territorial defense decreases as breeding season concludes.

Aggressive behavior occurs when intruding males enter another male's territory. This involves swimming directly at each other with fins extended. If the intruding male does not leave, both individuals develop a blue body coloration that intensifies as aggressiveness increases. When the fishes approach one another, they move their pelvic fins and often attack. This can involve chasing, head-to tail circling, and biting.

Researchers have observed that members of the Labridae family do school as juveniles, and some were observed schooling as adults too. Reef species do stay near reefs, which supply food and shelter.

== Food habits ==
Members of the Labridae family, particularly those living in or near coral reefs, have a diverse diet including corals, crustaceans, mollusks, and other fishes. Recently, it has been observed that the mucosa produced by the buccal cavity plays a role in prey acquisition. The Cirrhilabrus genus has a large amount of mucus secretion from cells of the buccal cavity, a trait uncommon in other planktivores. Their diet consists highly of amorphous organic matter. Cirrhilabrus eat by plucking small, suspended prey/material with suction rather than filtering the water column. Scientists believe that the mucus is not primarily related to particle retention, but it is used to help ingest gelatinous materials.

== Predation ==
Labridae are subject to predation by other fishes, so they often rely on the reef as shelter from predators. The predator of wrasses depends on the location in which they are found. For example, the dominant predator to Cirrhilabrus temminckii, which lives off the coast of Japan, is Synodus ulae, the lizardfish. The lizardfish has been seen attacking other wrasse species too. The lizardfish will attack from the bottom. Often, wrasses will quickly swim into seaweed and coral cover to hide.

Also, adult members of Cirrhilabrus will release their gametes up in the water column in order to be transported from the reef where they are less likely to be eaten by other members of the coral reef. Moving eggs and sperm away from the habitat might increase their chances of survival and prevent them from being eaten by larger predators.

== Ecosystem roles ==
Labridae, the family of wrasse fishes, provide benefit to the mesophotic coral ecosystem. By feeding on gelatinous organic debris, they serve to clean the corals for the survival of other fishes and allow the coral to grow. While they feed on the organic materials produced by other fishes and corals, they in turn positively impact those individuals by creating clearer waters for this mesophotic system (Sun et al., 2015).

Because of the unique mucoidal characteristic of Cirrhilabrus fishes as described previously, this allowed them to fit certain niches within the ecosystem and evolutionarily explode.

== Economic importance ==
Perhaps the most economically important attribute of Cirrhilabrus fishes is their role in the aquarium trade. Numerous species of the genus are collected primarily for their gorgeous bright colored bodies.

In the last ten years, scientists have shown that members of Labridae could be used in salmon aquaculture. Interestingly, they found that wrasses could possibly be used to eliminate lice from farmed Atlantic salmon. Perhaps this could lead to a new avenue of economic relevance of the wrasses if they become involved in maintaining the health of aquaculture systems (Skiftesvik et al., 2013).

== Conservation status ==
Recruitment of Cirrhilabrus is directly correlated to the abundance of coral. However, coral reef ecosystems are being threatened by anthropogenic influences like pollution and climate change. Cirrhilabrus finifenmaa will be affected by these anthropogenic influences. Studies have shown that fishing with drive nets and explosives was very destructive to the coral habitat. This not only affects the abundance and diversity of coral, but also that of the species relying on these habitats for survival, such as Cirrhilabrus species. The degradation of corals is increasing worldwide, which has significant effects on coral reef fishes. Ocean acidification, which is a result of increasing levels of carbon dioxide in the atmosphere that enters ocean waters, is one of the greatest threats to corals. This contributes to the degradation of corals, termed coral bleaching. In turn, this again affects the habitat and food that many fishes like Cirrhilabrus species rely on to survive. Without the presence of coral habitats, these fishes can experience ecological pressures and possibly reach endangerment or extinction. Subsequently, if the presence of Cirrhilabrus individuals declines, the corals and other fishes will suffer even more as Cirrhilabrus species feed on floating organic matter that helps clear the water.
