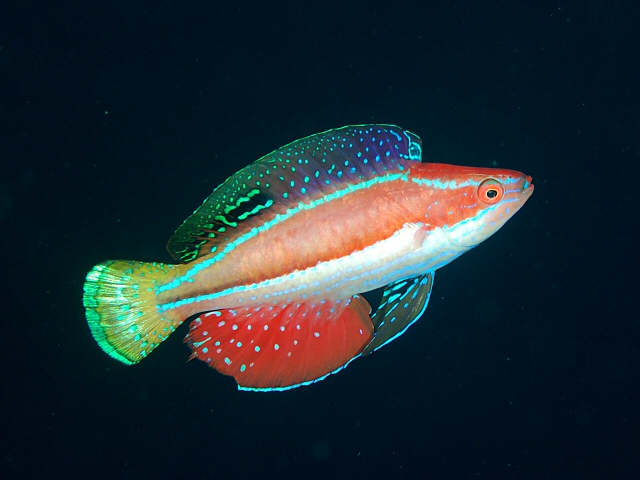

Conservation status
- Least Concern (IUCN 3.1)

Scientific classification
- Kingdom: Animalia
- Phylum: Chordata
- Class: Actinopterygii
- Order: Labriformes
- Family: Labridae
- Genus: Cirrhilabrus
- Species: C. katoi

Binomial name
- Cirrhilabrus katoi Senou & Hirata, 2000

= Cirrhilabrus katoi =

Species of fish

Cirrhilabrus katoi is a species of wrasse native to Japan. It is found in groups at depths from 20 to 40 m (66 to 131 ft).

== Etymology ==
The specific name honours Shoichi Kato, who collected the type specimen.

== Description ==
It has been described as having 11 total dorsal spines and 25 vertebrae. It can reach a standard length of 7.5 cm (3.0 in).
