= Yellowband wrasse =

Conservation status
- Least Concern (IUCN 3.1)

Scientific classification
- Kingdom: Animalia
- Phylum: Chordata
- Class: Actinopterygii
- Order: Labriformes
- Family: Labridae
- Genus: Cirrhilabrus
- Species: C. luteovittatus

Binomial name
- Cirrhilabrus luteovittatus J. E. Randall, 1988

Species of fish

The yellowband wrasse (Cirrhilabrus luteovittatus) is a species of wrasse native to coral reefs around the Pacific islands of the Caroline Islands, the Marshall Islands, and Pohnpei. It occurs at depths of 7 to 30 m (23 to 98 ft). It can reach a total length of 12 cm (4.7 in).
