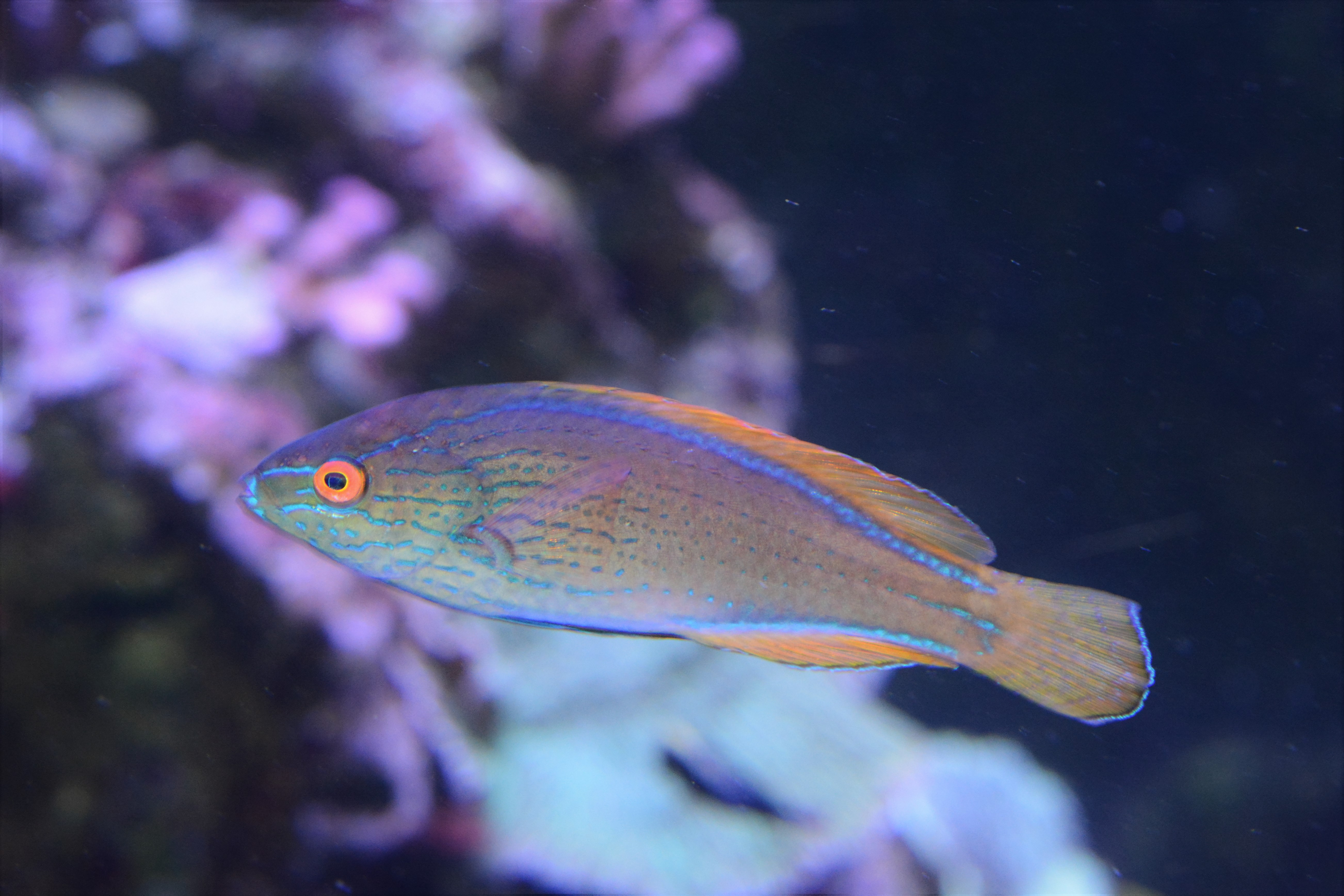

Conservation status
- Least Concern (IUCN 3.1)

Scientific classification
- Kingdom: Animalia
- Phylum: Chordata
- Class: Actinopterygii
- Order: Labriformes
- Family: Labridae
- Genus: Cirrhilabrus
- Species: C. lineatus

Binomial name
- Cirrhilabrus lineatus J. E. Randall & Lubbock, 1982

= Purple-lined wrasse =

Species of fish

The purple-lined wrasse (Cirrhilabrus lineatus), also known as the lavender wrasse, is a species of wrasse native to coral reefs of New Caledonia and Australia, where it can be found at depths from 20 to 55 m (66 to 180 ft). This species can reach a total length of 12 cm (4.7 in). It can be found in the aquarium trade. As a member of the family Labridae, Cirrhilabrus lineatus displays hermaphroditic behavior where a female may become a male when it is biologically favorable to do so. Generally, this occurs when competition from larger males disappears.
