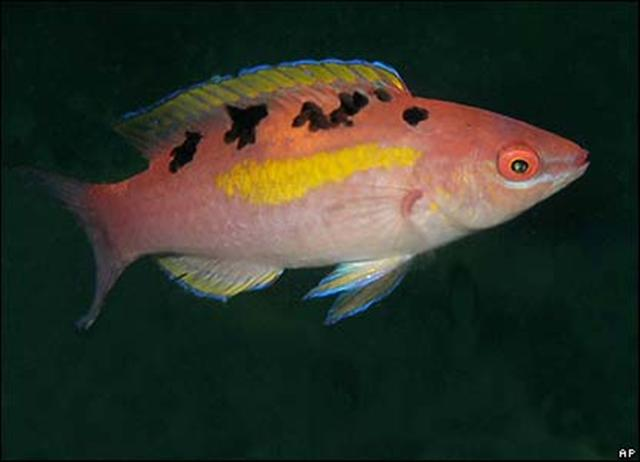

Conservation status
- Least Concern (IUCN 3.1).

Scientific classification
- Kingdom: Animalia
- Phylum: Chordata
- Class: Actinopterygii
- Order: Labriformes
- Family: Labridae
- Genus: Cirrhilabrus
- Species: C. cenderawasih

Binomial name
- Cirrhilabrus cenderawasih G. R. Allen & Erdmann, 2006

= Cirrhilabrus cenderawasih =

Species of fish

Cirrhilabrus cenderawasih is a species of fairy wrasse commonly found on sheltered seaward reefs. It is most abundant below depths of about 35 m and occurs between approximately 22 and 60 m. The species is generally found in Indonesia. The male Cirrhilabrus cenderawasih is pinkish, fading to white near the belly, which is typical of the complex. A yellow elongated blotch runs along the boundary between the pink and white areas, extending from the pectoral fin to about two-thirds of the body length. The female is entirely pink with a single black spot on the caudal fin. Males reach about 6.5 cm standard length (SL), while females reach about 4.7 cm SL. Bird's Head Peninsular in the northwest province of West Papua is the epicenter of three reefs.
