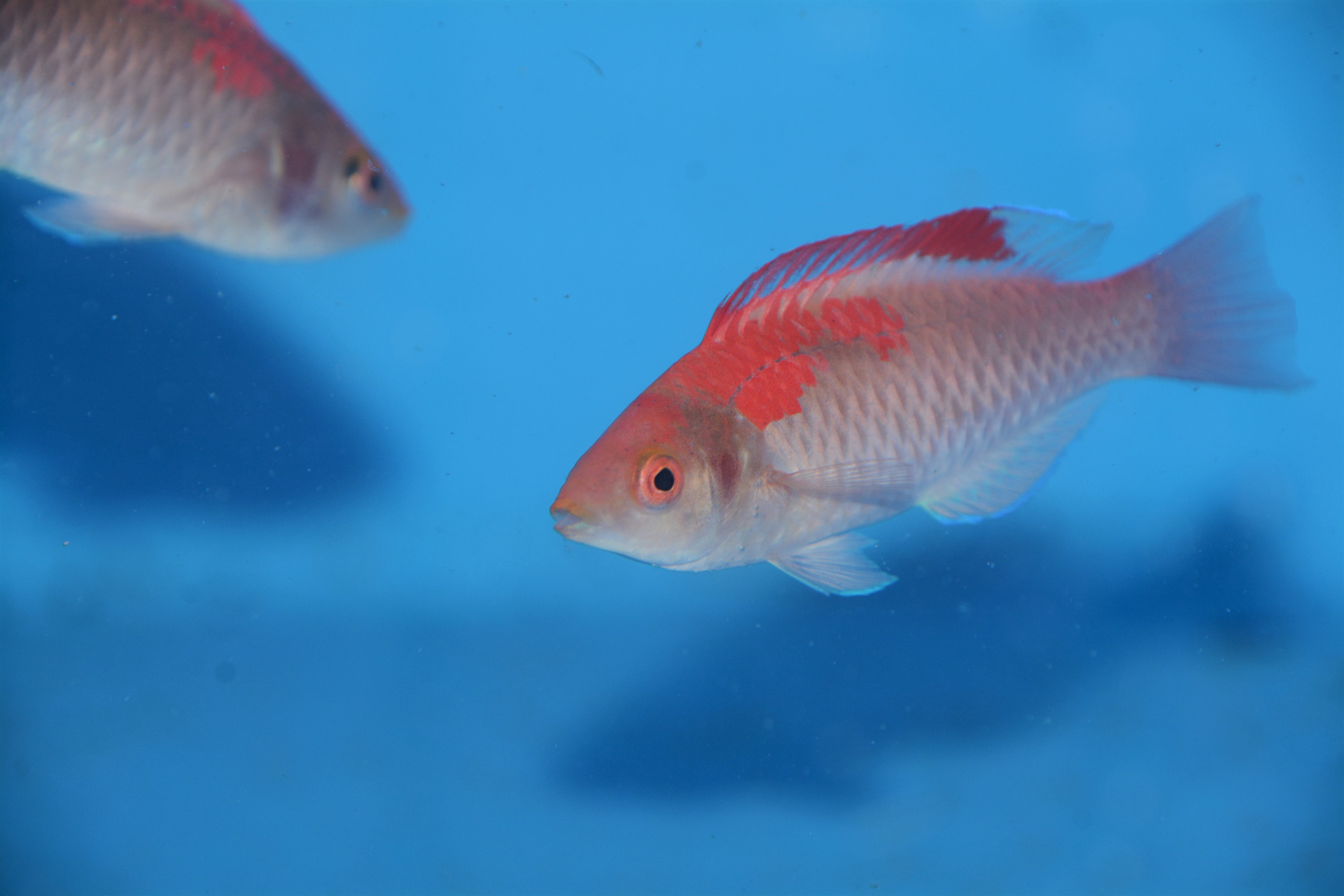

Conservation status
- Least Concern (IUCN 3.1)

Scientific classification
- Kingdom: Animalia
- Phylum: Chordata
- Class: Actinopterygii
- Order: Labriformes
- Family: Labridae
- Genus: Cirrhilabrus
- Species: C. adornatus

Binomial name
- Cirrhilabrus adornatus Randall & Kunzmann, 1998

= Cirrhilabrus adornatus =

Species of fish

Cirrhilabrus adornatus is a species of the labrid fish genus Cirrhilabrus and is also known as the red-fin fairy wrasse or Debelius fairy wrasse. They are found in the Eastern Indian Ocean which is known only from Indonesia (Sumatra and the Mentawai Islands) over a rubble bottom of 1212m. Male Cirrhilabrus adornatus have two large triangular bright red blotches on the body which are white to pale pink. Female with a black spot three-fourths orbit diameter posteriorly on side of caudal peduncle and shading to white ventrally on head and abdomen. They are small species with a height of 63.4 mm SL, body depth 2.9-3.2 in SL, and head length 2.75-3.05 in SL. Cirrhilabrus adornatus is the combination of 45–47 dorsal-fin rays, 28–30 anal fin rays, 50–52 total vertebrae, 51–54 lateral line scales, 8–12 cheek scales, two large scales on each side of the lower jaw undersurface.
