= Walindi fairy-wrasse =

Conservation status
- Least Concern (IUCN 3.1)

Scientific classification
- Kingdom: Animalia
- Phylum: Chordata
- Class: Actinopterygii
- Order: Labriformes
- Family: Labridae
- Genus: Cirrhilabrus
- Species: C. walindi

Binomial name
- Cirrhilabrus walindi Allen & Randall, 1996

Species of fish

The Walindi fairy-wrasse (Cirrhilabrus walindi) is a species of wrasse native to the coral reefs of the Pacific Ocean. This species can reach a total length of 7.0 cm (2.8 in). It can be found at depths from 20 to 65 m (66 to 213 ft).

Named for Walindi Plantation Resort, located on the edge of Kimbe Bay, New Britain, Papua New Guinea, the type locality.
