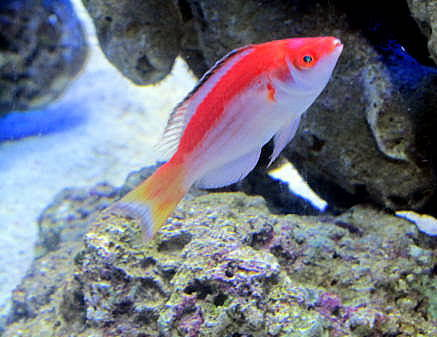

Conservation status
- Least Concern (IUCN 3.1)

Scientific classification
- Kingdom: Animalia
- Phylum: Chordata
- Class: Actinopterygii
- Order: Labriformes
- Family: Labridae
- Genus: Cirrhilabrus
- Species: C. marjorie

Binomial name
- Cirrhilabrus marjorie Allen, Randall & Carlson, 2003

= Marjorie's wrasse =

Species of fish

Marjorie's wrasse (Cirrhilabrus marjorie) is a species of wrasse native to the coral reefs of the Fiji. This species can reach a standard length of 5.8 cm (2.3 in). It can be found at depths from 20 to 50 m (66 to 164 ft), most often between 30 and 36 m (98 and 118 ft). The specific name honours Marjorie Awai, the Curator of the Florida Aquarium, and who was formerly a Curatorial Assistant in the ichthyology Department at the Bishop Museum in Hawaii.
