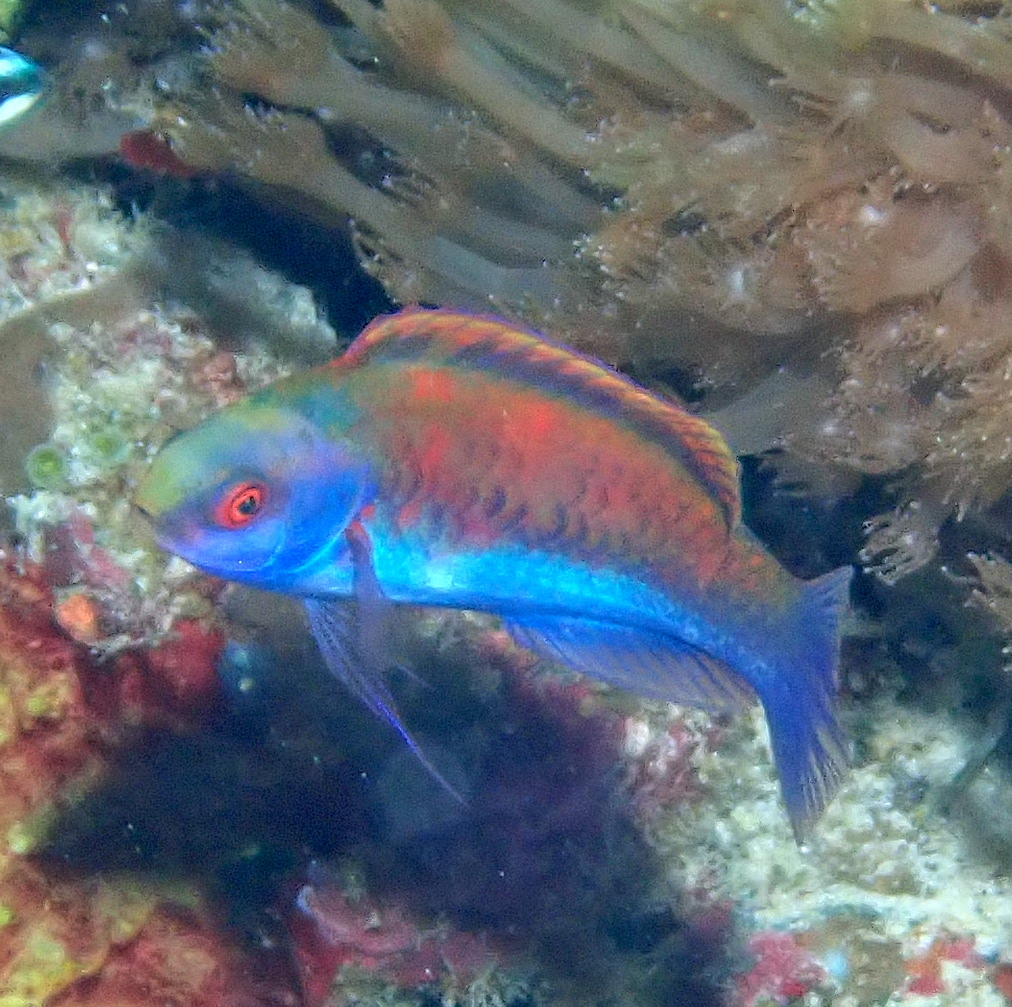

Conservation status
- Data Deficient (IUCN 3.1)

Scientific classification
- Kingdom: Animalia
- Phylum: Chordata
- Class: Actinopterygii
- Order: Labriformes
- Family: Labridae
- Genus: Cirrhilabrus
- Species: C. solorensis

Binomial name
- Cirrhilabrus solorensis Bleeker, 1853

= Red-eye wrasse =

Species of fish

The red-eye wrasse (Cirrhilabrus solorensis) is a species of wrasse native to Indonesia and Australia, where found near the Lesser Sundas, Maluka and Darwin. It inhabits coral reefs on coastal and outer reef lagoons at depths of 5 to 35 m (16 to 115 ft).

Adult male C. solorensis have a yellowish-dusky or yellow-green snout to crown, blue operculum, purple neck-region, yellow-orange upper body and blue belly. It can reach a total length of 11 cm (4.3 in). Until 2021, it was commonly confused with C. aquamarinus and C. chaliasi, which occur in similar habitats and all have mostly reddish eyes. In C. aquamarinus, which is found near Sulawesi, the adult male has a mostly deep yellow head, a dark blue back and operculum, and much of the body is blue-green. In C. chaliasi, which is found near the Lesser Sundas and Tukangbesi Islands, the adult male has a pinkish-red head, yellow-orange upper body and blue belly. Females of these species are considerably duller and not as easily separated.

C. solorensis occurs in small harems of one male, several females and juveniles. It is regarded as data deficient by the IUCN. It can be found in the aquarium trade.
