= Cirrhilabrus punctatus =

Conservation status
- Least Concern (IUCN 3.1)

Scientific classification
- Kingdom: Animalia
- Phylum: Chordata
- Class: Actinopterygii
- Order: Labriformes
- Family: Labridae
- Genus: Cirrhilabrus
- Species: C. punctatus

Binomial name
- Cirrhilabrus punctatus J. E. Randall & Kuiter, 1989

Species of fish

Cirrhilabrus punctatus, dotted wrasse, or, is a species of wrasse native to the western Pacific Ocean, where it occurs from Papua New Guinea and Australia to Tonga and Fiji. It inhabits coral reefs at depths from 2 to 35 m (6.6 to 114.8 ft), though mostly between 5 and 28 m (16 and 92 ft). It can reach a total length of 13 cm (5.1 in). This species is found in the aquarium trade.
