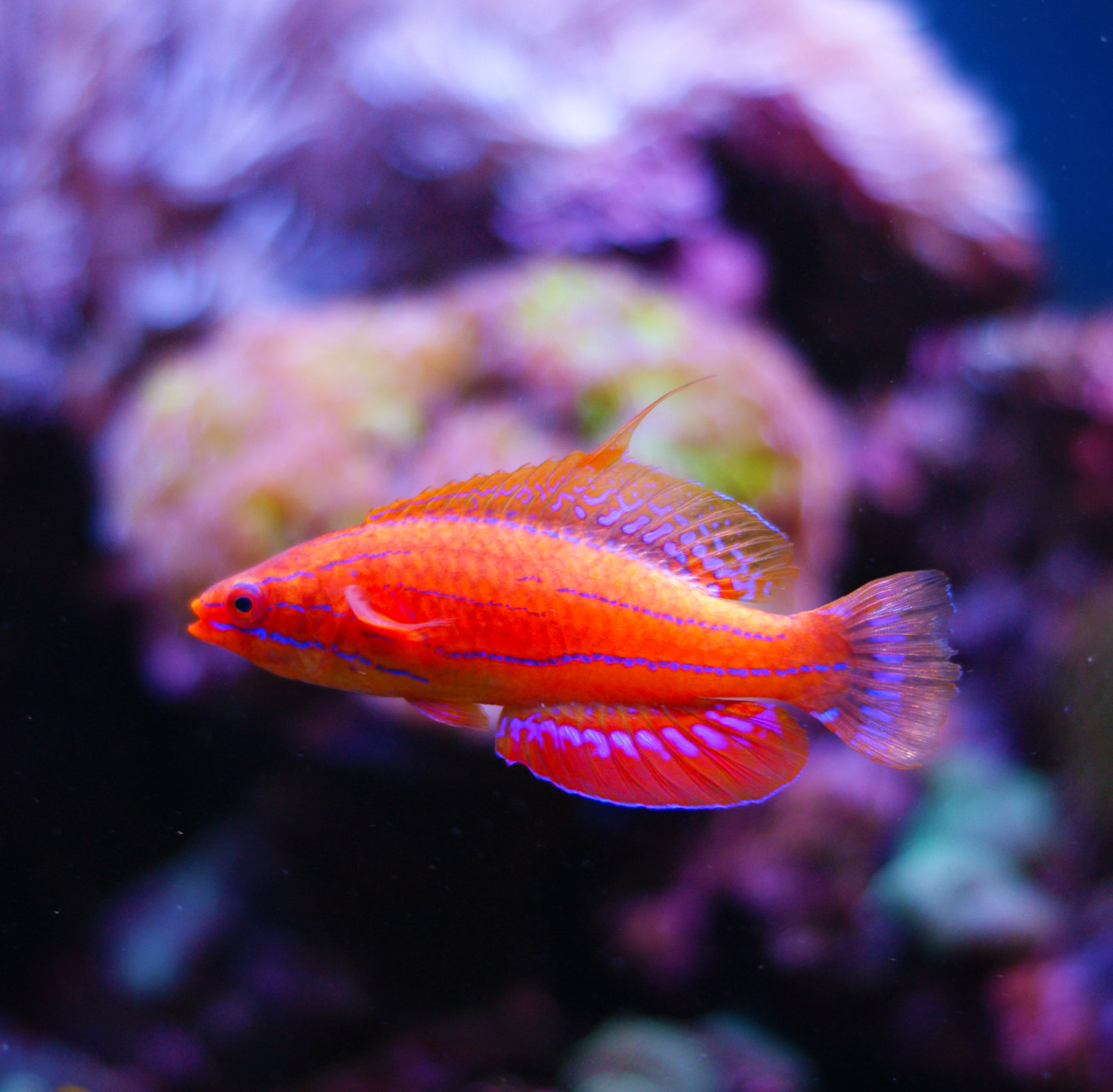
- Pink flasher wrasse (P. carpenteri)

Scientific classification
- Domain: Eukaryota
- Kingdom: Animalia
- Phylum: Chordata
- Class: Actinopterygii
- Order: Labriformes
- Family: Labridae
- Genus: Paracheilinus; Fourmanoir, 1955

Type species
- Paracheilinus octotaenia Fourmanoir, 1955

= Paracheilinus =

Genus of fishes

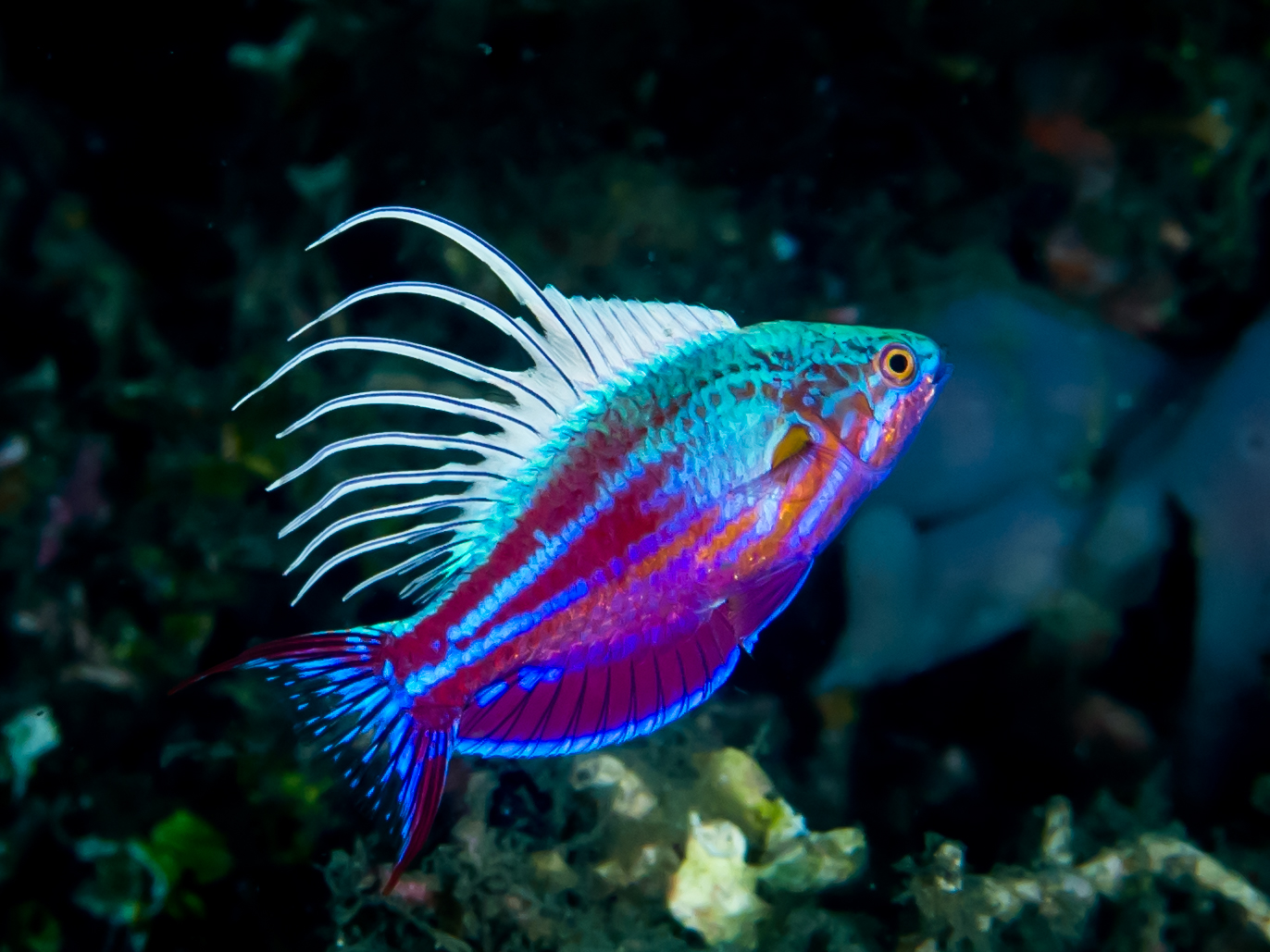
Blue flasher wrasse (P. cyaneus)

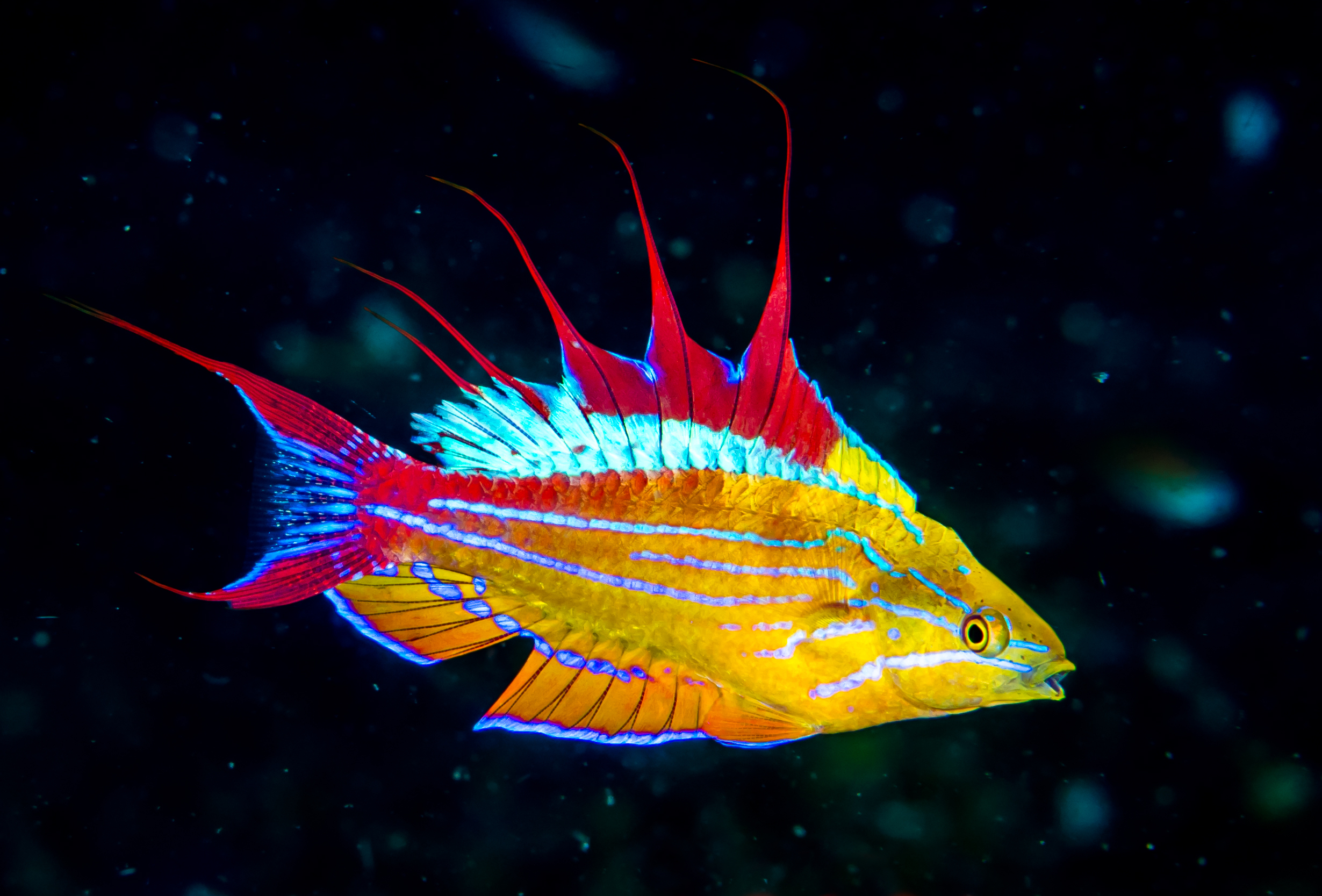
Paine's flasher wrasse (P. paineorum)

Paracheilinus is a genus of flasher wrasses, native to the Indian Ocean and the western Pacific Ocean.

== Species ==
There are currently 20 recognized species in this genus:

- Paracheilinus alfiani G. R. Allen, Erdmann & Yusmalinda, 2016
- Paracheilinus amanda Tea & F. Walsh 2023 (Amanda's flasher wrasse)
- Paracheilinus angulatus J. E. Randall & Lubbock, 1981 (Angular flasherwrasse)
- Paracheilinus attenuatus J. E. Randall, 1999
- Paracheilinus bellae J. E. Randall, 1988 (Bell's flasherwrasse)
- Paracheilinus carpenteri J. E. Randall & Lubbock, 1981 (Pink flasherwrasse)
- Paracheilinus cyaneus Kuiter & G. R. Allen, 1999 (Blue flasherwrasse)
- Paracheilinus filamentosus G. R. Allen, 1974 (Filamentous flasherwrasse)
- Paracheilinus flavianalis Kuiter & G. R. Allen, 1999 (Yellow-fin flasherwrasse)
- Paracheilinus hemitaeniatus J. E. Randall & Harmelin-Vivien, 1977
- Paracheilinus lineopunctatus J. E. Randall & Lubbock, 1981 (Spot-lined flasherwrasse)
- Paracheilinus mccoskeri J. E. Randall & Harmelin-Vivien, 1977 (McCosker's flasherwrasse)
- Paracheilinus nursalim G. R. Allen & Erdmann, 2008 (Nursalim flasherwrasse)
- Paracheilinus octotaenia Fourmanoir, 1955 (Red Sea eightline flasherwrasse)
- Paracheilinus paineorum G. R. Allen, Erdmann & Yusmalinda, 2016
- Paracheilinus piscilineatus (Cornic, 1987)
- Paracheilinus rennyae G. R. Allen, Erdmann & Yusmalinda, 2013
- Paracheilinus rubricaudalis J. E. Randall & G. R. Allen, 2003 (Red-tail flasherwrasse)
- Paracheilinus togeanensis Kuiter & G. R. Allen, 1999 (Togean flasherwrasse)
- Paracheilinus walton G. R. Allen & Erdmann, 2006 (Walton's flasherwrasse)
- Paracheilinus xanthocirritus G. R. Allen, Erdmann & Yusmalinda, 2016
