= Cirrhilabrus balteatus =

Conservation status
- Data Deficient (IUCN 3.1)

Scientific classification
- Domain: Eukaryota
- Kingdom: Animalia
- Phylum: Chordata
- Class: Actinopterygii
- Order: Labriformes
- Family: Labridae
- Genus: Cirrhilabrus
- Species: C. balteatus

Binomial name
- Cirrhilabrus balteatus Randall, 1988

Species of fish

Cirrhilabrus balteatus, the girdled fairy-wrasse, is a species of fish found in the aquarium trade. In the wild, they are found in the Western Pacific Ocean near the Marshall Islands, but population numbers are unknown. They are usually found at a depth between 25 – 85 feet (8 – 25 m) in shallow lagoons and seaward reefs where rubble collects. The species grows to be about 4 inches in length, and it feeds on zooplankton. Female Cirrhilabrus balteatus are drab reddish-pink with a white belly, while males have a body that varies in colors from purple to pink or greenish-yellow.

It is likely the aquarium trade is causing a decline in wild populations, as members of the species are very valuable.
