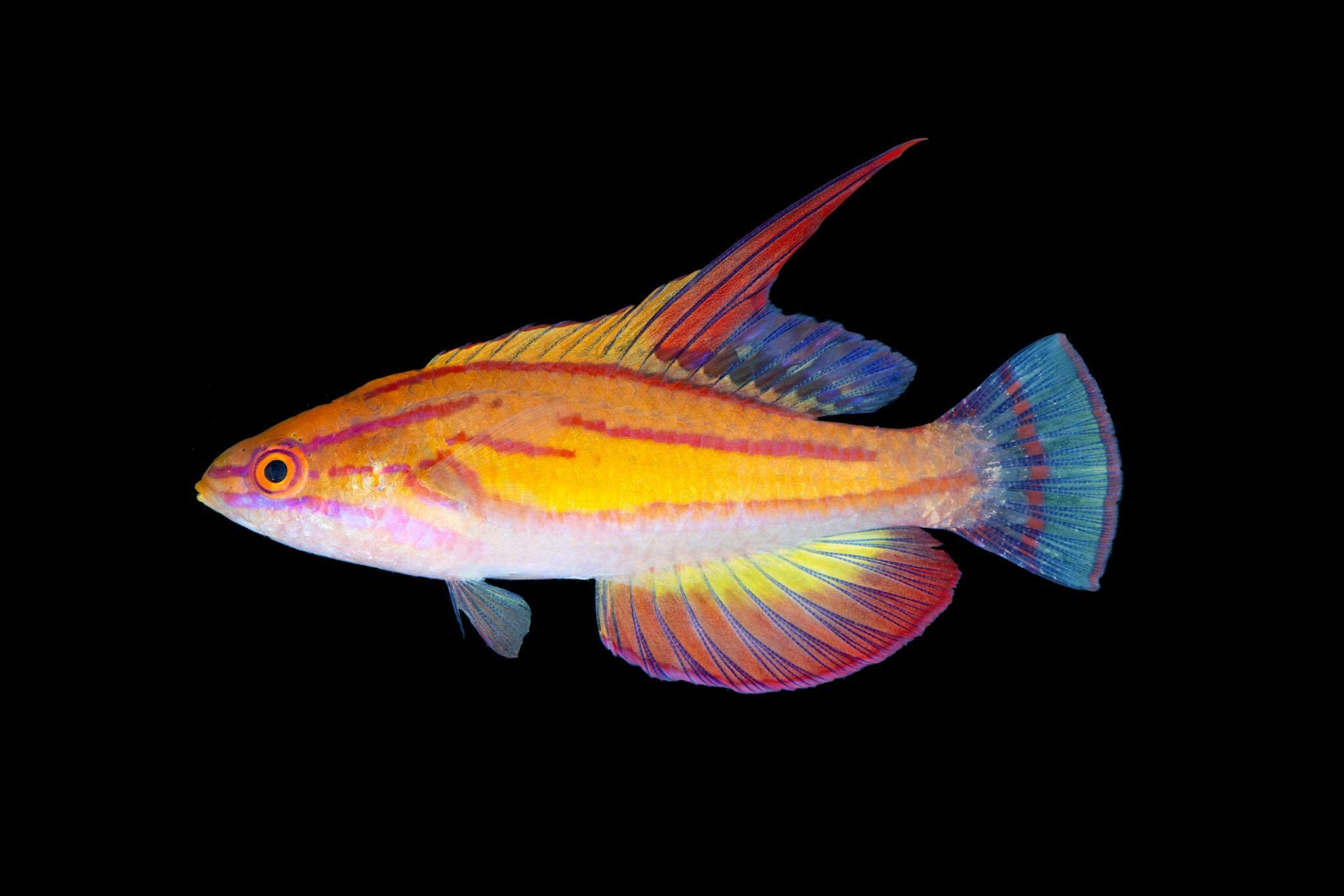

Scientific classification
- Kingdom: Animalia
- Phylum: Chordata
- Class: Actinopterygii
- Order: Labriformes
- Family: Labridae
- Genus: Paracheilinus
- Species: P. amanda

Binomial name
- Paracheilinus amanda Tea & F. Walsh 2023

= Amanda's flasher wrasse =

Species of fish

Amanda's flasher wrasse (Paracheilinus amanda) is a colorful cryptic species of wrasse discovered in the Great Barrier Reef off the coast of Australia. The wrasse was described through a major taxonomic review of wrasses of the genus Paracheilinus off the Australian coast. It is found in the reefs of the Great Barrier Reef and the Coral Sea, with sightings off the coast of Queensland state.
