= Cirrhilabrus walshi =

Conservation status
- Least Concern (IUCN 3.1)

Scientific classification
- Kingdom: Animalia
- Phylum: Chordata
- Class: Actinopterygii
- Order: Labriformes
- Family: Labridae
- Genus: Cirrhilabrus
- Species: C. walshi

Binomial name
- Cirrhilabrus walshi J. E. Randall & Pyle, 2001

Species of fish

Cirrhilabrus walshi is a species of wrasse native to the American Samoa. This species can reach a standard length of 6.3 cm (2.5 in). It inhabits coral reefs and it can be found at depths from 37 to 46 m (121 to 151 ft). The specific name honours Fenton Walsh, at Cairns Marine, a marine aquarium-fish exporter in Queensland, Australia, who collected the type. in 1989.
