= Whip-fin wrasse =

Conservation status
- Data Deficient (IUCN 3.1)

Scientific classification
- Kingdom: Animalia
- Phylum: Chordata
- Class: Actinopterygii
- Order: Labriformes
- Family: Labridae
- Genus: Cirrhilabrus
- Species: C. filamentosus

Binomial name
- Cirrhilabrus filamentosus (Klausewitz, 1976)

Synonyms
- Cirrhilabrichthys filamentosus Klausewitz, 1976

Species of fish

The whip-fin wrasse (Cirrhilabrus filamentosus) is a species of wrasse endemic to Indonesia, where it is only known from the waters of the Java Sea. This species inhabits reefs and can be found at depths from 10 to 35 m (33 to 115 ft). It can reach 8 cm (3.1 in) in total length. Both its common name and its specific name refer to the long filament extending from the tenth and eleventh rays of the dorsal fin.
