= Cirrhilabrus condei =

Conservation status
- Least Concern (IUCN 3.1).

Scientific classification
- Kingdom: Animalia
- Phylum: Chordata
- Class: Actinopterygii
- Order: Labriformes
- Family: Labridae
- Genus: Cirrhilabrus
- Species: C. condei

Binomial name
- Cirrhilabrus condei G. R. Allen & J. E. Randall, 1996

Species of fish

Cirrhilabrus condei are fairy wrasse which is also known as Conde's wrasse. They originate from the shallow rubble flats of Melanesia. The Conde's fairy wrasse is very peaceful; they are red alone black with a white belly. Female Conde's wrasse are red with a pale stripe along the lower rear, a black dorsal fin, a pale stripe with a white lower body, and a red anal fin. Males are similar with more intense coloration. The life cycle and mating behavior of Cirrhilabrus condei distinct pairing during breeding. Unlike other wrasses, they raise the front 2/3 of their dorsal fins and sometimes colors may vary depending on the fish's mood, breeding timeframe, and age of the specimen.

== Size ==
This species reaches a length of 8.0 cm (3.1 in).

== Etymology ==
The fish is named in honor of zoologist Bruno Condé (1920–2004), the director of the Aquarium Museum of Nancy, because of his service as the editor of Revue française d'Aquariologie, the journal in which the description appeared, and for his contributions to the aquarium field.
