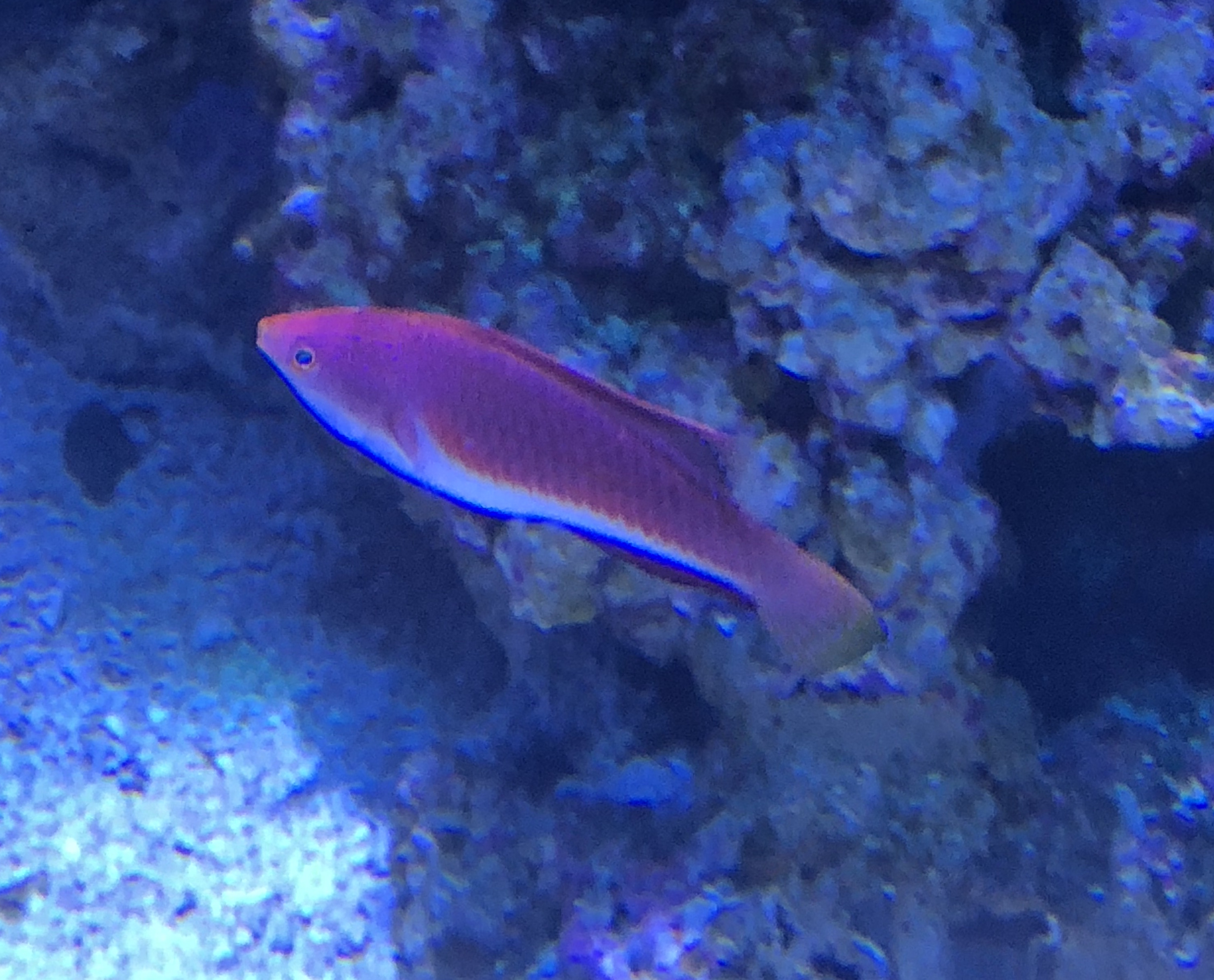

Scientific classification
- Kingdom: Animalia
- Phylum: Chordata
- Class: Actinopterygii
- Order: Labriformes
- Family: Labridae
- Genus: Cirrhilabrus
- Species: C. cyanogularis

Binomial name
- Cirrhilabrus cyanogularis Tea, Frable & A. C. Gill, 2018

= Cirrhilabrus cyanogularis =

Blue-throated fairy wrasse

Species of fish

Cirrhilabrus cyanogularis, also known by its common name blue-throated fairy wrasse, is a species of the fairy wrasse family, which may also be known as sailfin fairy wrasse. It originates from Indonesia to the Philippines. The name cyanogularis comes from the Greek for 'blue throat', this refers to the brilliant cerulean breast that is seen in males. It’s perhaps most prominent in Cirrhilabrus cyanogularis have the closest relatives showing this same feature to some extent. This also holds for its extended family in Melanesia (condei, walshi) and in the Indian Ocean (Rubeus, Africanus, Rubriventralis). The male Cirrhilabrus cyanogularis has a large blue patch on the throat below the eyes and its head and body are orange to orange-red, and the lower part of the head white and with a series of fine white stripes. The female is similar to the male, its body is uniformly orange to orange-red with three to four fine white stripes dorsally.
