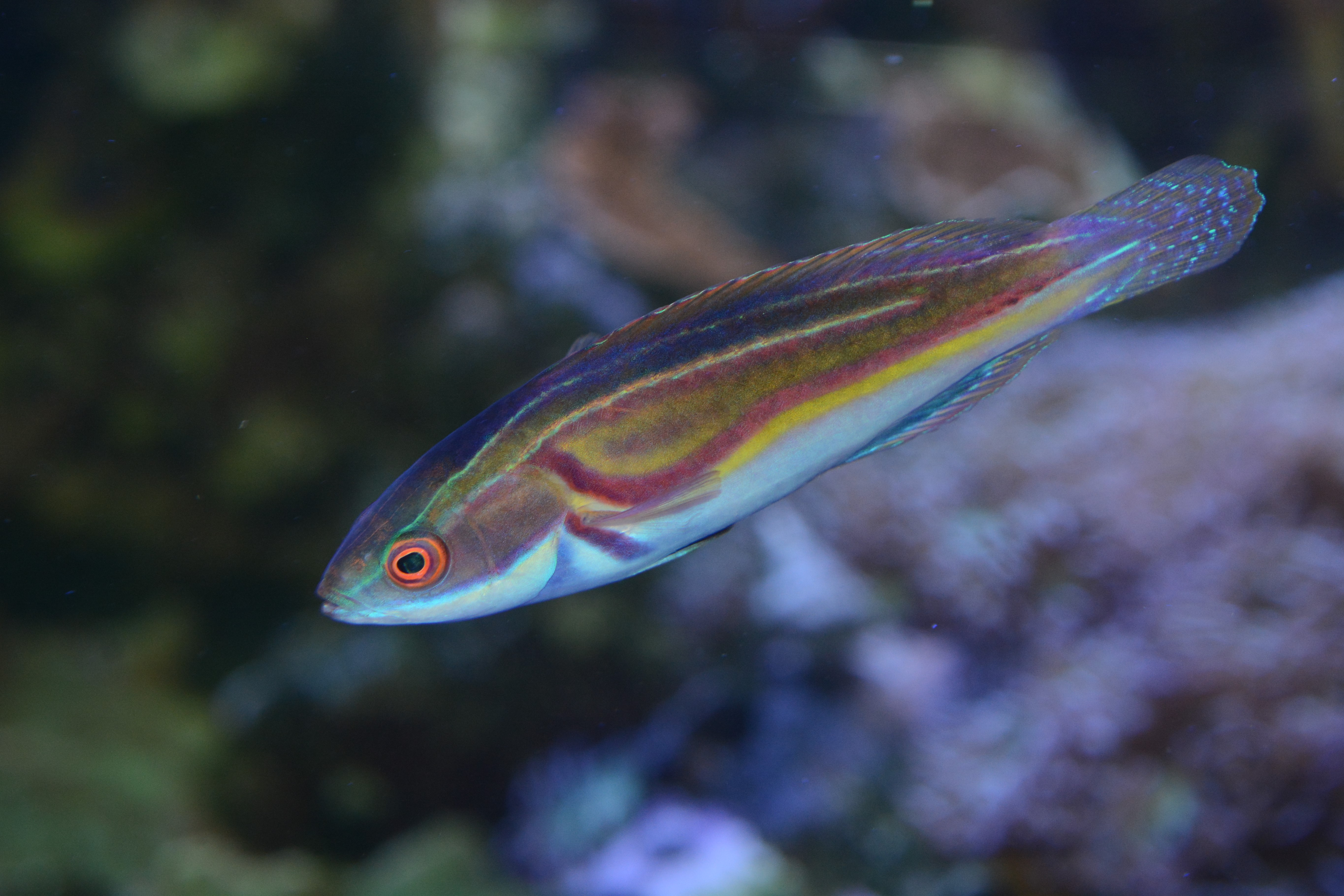

Conservation status
- Least Concern (IUCN 3.1)

Scientific classification
- Kingdom: Animalia
- Phylum: Chordata
- Class: Actinopterygii
- Order: Labriformes
- Family: Labridae
- Genus: Cirrhilabrus
- Species: C. laboutei

Binomial name
- Cirrhilabrus laboutei J. E. Randall & Lubbock, 1982

= Laboute's wrasse =

Species of fish

Laboute's wrasse (Cirrhilabrus laboutei) is a species of wrasse native to the coral reefs of New Caledonia and Australia, where it occurs at depths of 7 to 55 m (23 to 180 ft). This species can reach a total length of 12 cm (4.7 in). It can be found in the aquarium trade. The specific name of this fish honours Pierre Laboute who first photographed this species off New Caledonia and gave J.E. Randall advice on where to collect specimens.
