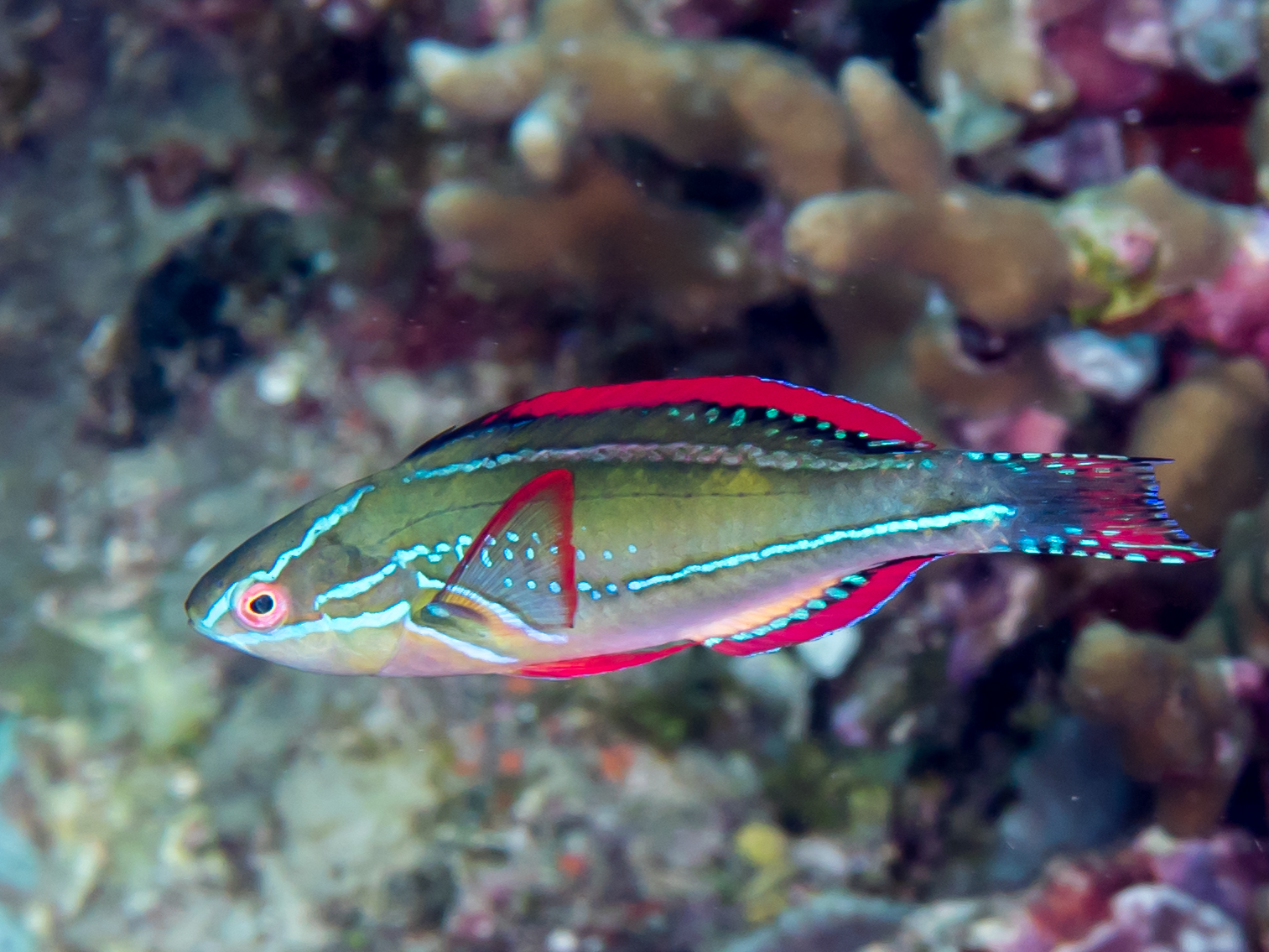

Conservation status
- Data Deficient (IUCN 3.1)

Scientific classification
- Kingdom: Animalia
- Phylum: Chordata
- Class: Actinopterygii
- Order: Labriformes
- Family: Labridae
- Genus: Cirrhilabrus
- Species: C. exquisitus

Binomial name
- Cirrhilabrus exquisitus J. L. B. Smith, 1957

= Exquisite wrasse =

Species of fish

The exquisite wrasse (Cirrhilabrus exquisitus) is a species of ray-finned fish from the family Labridae, the wrasses, which is native to reefs in the Indo-West Pacific region. It can be found in the aquarium trade.

== Naming and taxonomy ==
Cirrhilabrus exquisitus was formally described by the South African ichthyologist James L.B. Smith in 1957 with the type locality given as Pinda in Mozambique. This is the most widespread member of the genus Cirrhilabrus and may prove to represent a species complex.

== Distribution ==
The exquisite wrasse is found from the eastern coast of Africa as far south as Sodwana Bay in South Africa, east through the Indian Ocean to Australia and into the Pacific Ocean as far as east as the Tuamotus, French Polynesia. It reaches north as far as the Ryukyu Islands and south to the northern Great Barrier Reef.

== Description ==
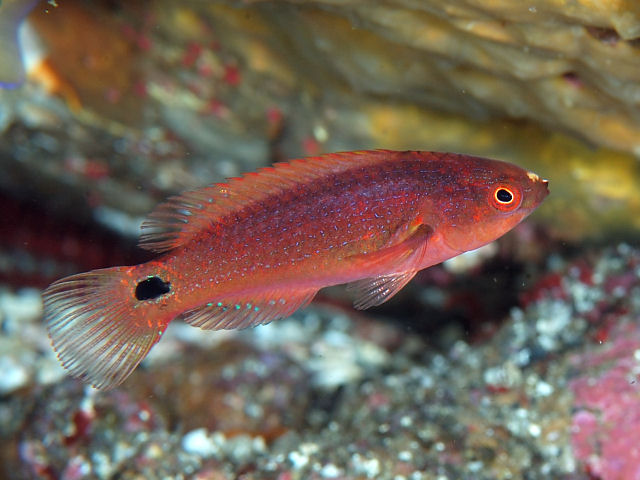
Juvenile

The exquisite wrasse has a dominant colour of greenish through to reddish and exhibits complex patterning of colours. The adult males are olive-green dorsally fading to white, pale blue or pink on their underparts and having an oval shaped dark spot on the caudal peduncle which has its bottom margin touching the lateral line. A blue line, which is frequently interrupted, runs from underneath the pectoral fin to the spot on the tail base, and another blue line runs from the corner of the mouth to above the eye before running along the base of the dorsal fin, a second line on the head runs from the posterior edge of the eye until it breaks up above the pectoral fin, and a third line runs from the rear of the mouth to the just above the pectoral-fin base. The base of the pectoral fin is marked with a black bar, edged with blue while the margin of that fin is red. All of the fins show variable amounts of red in their middle portions. The juveniles and smaller females are reddish with a blue-margined black oval-shaped spot on the caudal peduncle and a white spot at the tip of the snout. The colouration shown by exquisite wrasse does vary geographically. A male can attain a standard length of 12 centimetres (4.7 in).

== Habitat and biology ==
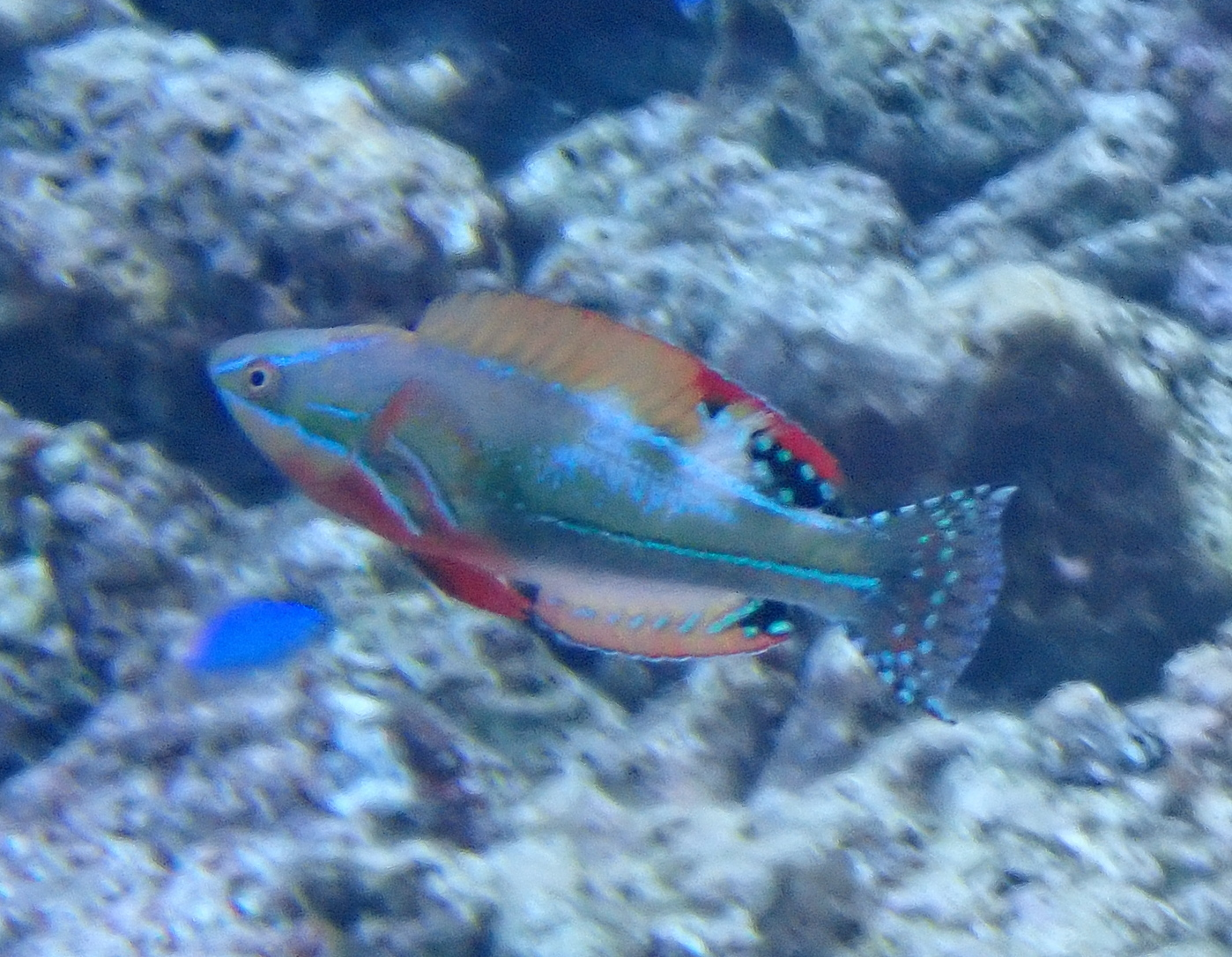
Terminal phase, at Fiji

The exquisite wrasse occurs where there is rubble or low patches of reefs where there is a strong current; it is also found on reef edges and around exposed outcrops of reef within areas of rubble. It can occur in reasonably large, mixed sex groups when feeding on zooplankton high above the seabed. The males often display to each other. It is considered that there may be some association with the mushroom Heliofungia actiniformis. They are protogynous hermaphrodites the males developing a larger size, longer more pointed fins and more colourful body pattern as the transform from females to males.

== Human uses ==
This species is collected for the aquarium trade, but it has not yet been bred in the aquarium.
