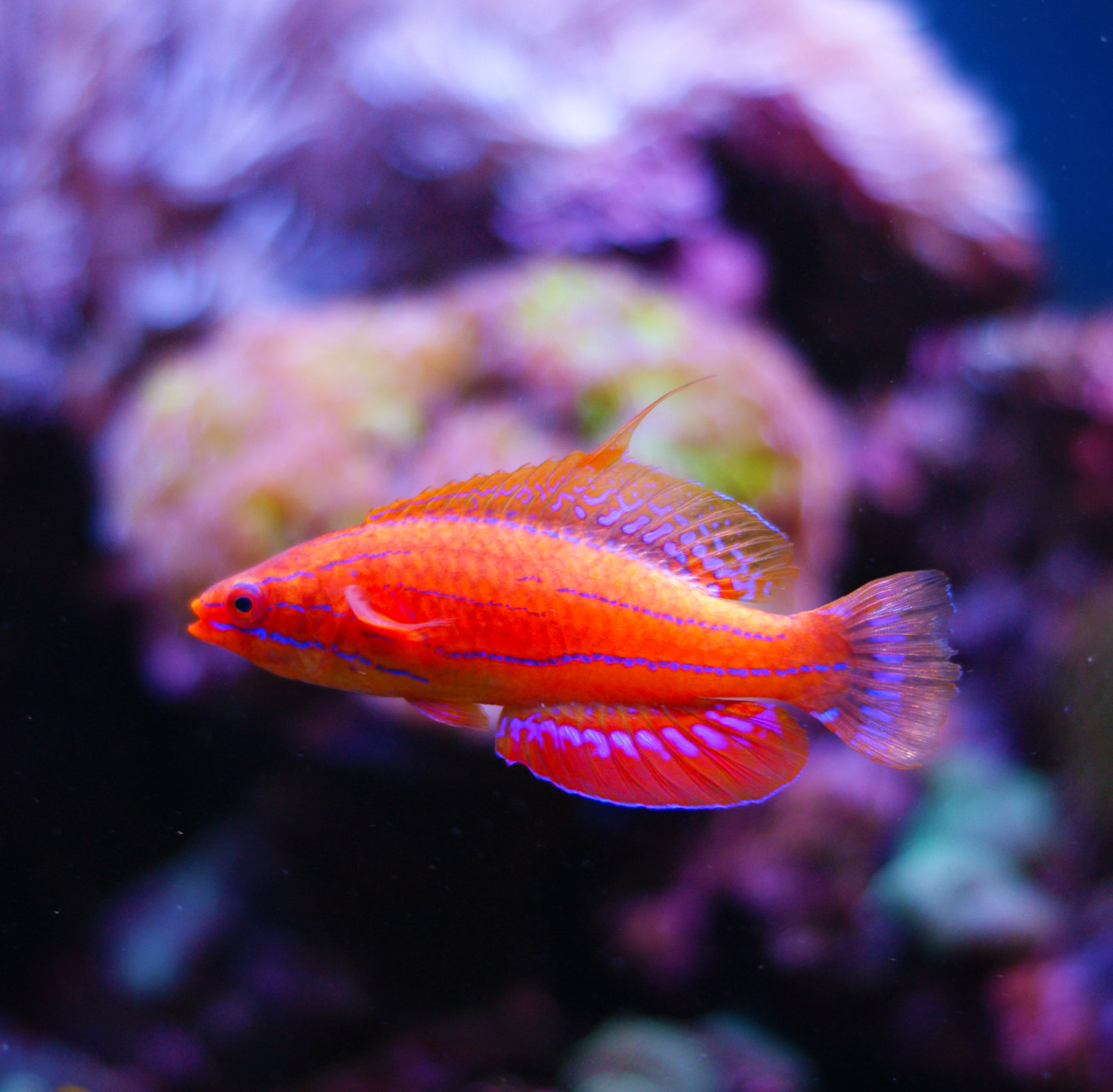

Conservation status
- Data Deficient (IUCN 3.1)

Scientific classification
- Kingdom: Animalia
- Phylum: Chordata
- Class: Actinopterygii
- Order: Labriformes
- Family: Labridae
- Genus: Paracheilinus
- Species: P. carpenteri

Binomial name
- Paracheilinus carpenteri J. E. Randall & Lubbock, 1981

= Carpenter's flasher wrasse =

Species of fish

The Carpenter's flasher wrasse (Paracheilinus carpenteri) is a species of wrasse native to the western Pacific Ocean. It can be found on reefs at depths from 27 to 45 m (89 to 148 ft). This species can reach 8 cm (3.1 in) in standard length. It can be found in the aquarium trade.

As with other members of this genus, the "flashing" mating behaviour involves short, quick dashes through the water column by the male whilst concomitantly flaring its fins and intensifying in colour in the presence of females - this behaviour commonly takes place starting from a secure place near reef rocks or the sand bed, "flashing" in the water column, and then returning to the point of origination; this display is thought to attract females and/or stimulate mating. Flashing is much less common in the absence of females, and is considered very visually desirable by many aquarists.

== Etymology ==
The species is named in honor of Kent Carpenter, a marine biologist from the Old Dominion University, who was the principal collector of the type specimens.

== Aquarium keeping ==
It regularly makes its way into the aquarium trade. It is generally considered to be one of the easier wrasses to keep in captivity, adapting quickly to a fairly indiscriminate carnivorous diet. It is considered "reef-safe" in the aquarium as it does not attack or harass invertebrates or nibble at coral polyps.
