= Paracheilinus alfiani =

Scientific classification
- Kingdom: Animalia
- Phylum: Chordata
- Class: Actinopterygii
- Order: Labriformes
- Family: Labridae
- Genus: Paracheilinus
- Species: P. alfiani

Binomial name
- Paracheilinus alfiani G. R. Allen, Erdmann & Yusmalinda, 2016

Species of ray-finned fish

Paracheilinus alfiani, known as Alfian's flasher wrasse, is a species of flasher wrasses in the family Labridae. It was discovered off the coast of Lembata, Indonesia and first described in 2016.

== Description ==
The species is generally found on sloping, low profile bottoms with branching hard and soft corals like Sarcophyton and Xenia.
