= McCosker's flasher wrasse =

Conservation status
- Least Concern (IUCN 3.1)

Scientific classification
- Kingdom: Animalia
- Phylum: Chordata
- Class: Actinopterygii
- Order: Labriformes
- Family: Labridae
- Genus: Paracheilinus
- Species: P. mccoskeri

Binomial name
- Paracheilinus mccoskeri J. E. Randall & Harmelin-Vivien, 1977

Species of fish

McCosker's flasher wrasse, Paracheilinus mccoskeri, is a species of wrasse native to the Indian Ocean, from East Africa to Thailand and northern Sumatra. It is a reef inhabitant, at depths from 5 to 40 m (16 to 131 ft), and can grow to 8 cm (3.1 in) in total length. It can be found in the aquarium trade. The common name and specific name honours the American ichthyologist John E. McCosker who collected the type specimens and colour photographs used in the description of this species by Randall and Harmelin-Vivien.
