= Cirrhilabrus brunneus =

Conservation status
- Data Deficient (IUCN 3.1)

Scientific classification
- Kingdom: Animalia
- Phylum: Chordata
- Class: Actinopterygii
- Order: Labriformes
- Family: Labridae
- Genus: Cirrhilabrus
- Species: C. brunneus

Binomial name
- Cirrhilabrus brunneus G. R. Allen, 2006

Species of fairy wrasse

Cirrhilabrus brunneus or the dusky fairy wrasse is a species of fairy wrasse native to the coasts off Borneo. It can be found at depths of 40–50 meters.

== Description ==
The fish can grow to a length of 4.4 centimeters. It has 11 dorsal spines, nine dorsal soft rays, 3 anal spines, and 9 anal soft rays. Males are brown or bronze. The fish also has 15 pectoral rays and two horizontal scale rows are present under the eyes.
