= Rhomboid wrasse =

Conservation status
- Data Deficient (IUCN 3.1)

Scientific classification
- Kingdom: Animalia
- Phylum: Chordata
- Class: Actinopterygii
- Order: Labriformes
- Family: Labridae
- Genus: Cirrhilabrus
- Species: C. rhomboidalis

Binomial name
- Cirrhilabrus rhomboidalis J. E. Randall, 1988

Species of fish

The rhomboid wrasse (Cirrhilabrus rhomboidalis) is a species of wrasse endemic to the Marshall Islands, where it is only known from Kwajalein Atoll. It inhabits coral reefs down to 40 m (130 ft). This species can reach a total length of 8.5 cm (3.3 in). Found in sleep outer slopes of coastal coral reefs of the Marshall Islands.
