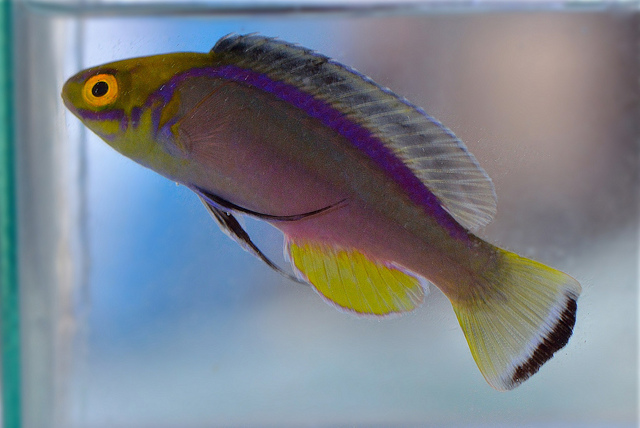

Conservation status
- Least Concern (IUCN 3.1)

Scientific classification
- Kingdom: Animalia
- Phylum: Chordata
- Class: Actinopterygii
- Order: Labriformes
- Family: Labridae
- Genus: Cirrhilabrus
- Species: C. claire

Binomial name
- Cirrhilabrus claire Randall & Pyle, 2001

= Cirrhilabrus claire =

Species of fish

Cirrhilabrus claire is a species of wrasse native to the Cook Islands. It inhabits coral reefs and it can be found at depths from 55 to 100 m (180 to 328 ft). This species can reach a standard length of 8.4 cm (3.3 in). It can be found in the aquarium trade.
