= Longfin fairy wrasse =

Conservation status
- Least Concern (IUCN 3.1)

Scientific classification
- Kingdom: Animalia
- Phylum: Chordata
- Class: Actinopterygii
- Order: Labriformes
- Family: Labridae
- Genus: Cirrhilabrus
- Species: C. rubriventralis

Binomial name
- Cirrhilabrus rubriventralis V. G. Springer & J. E. Randall, 1974

Species of fish

The longfin fairy wrasse (Cirrhilabrus rubriventralis) also known as the social wrasse, is a species of wrasse from the western Indian Ocean from the Red Sea to South Africa, though questionable claims have been made for its occurrence out to the western Pacific. It inhabits coral reefs at depths of 3 to 43 m (9.8 to 141.1 ft). This species can reach a total length of 7.5 cm (3.0 in). It can be found in the aquarium trade.

There is another species referred to as the social wrasse, Halichoeres socialis, found only in the Pelican Keys in Belize. It is critically endangered.
