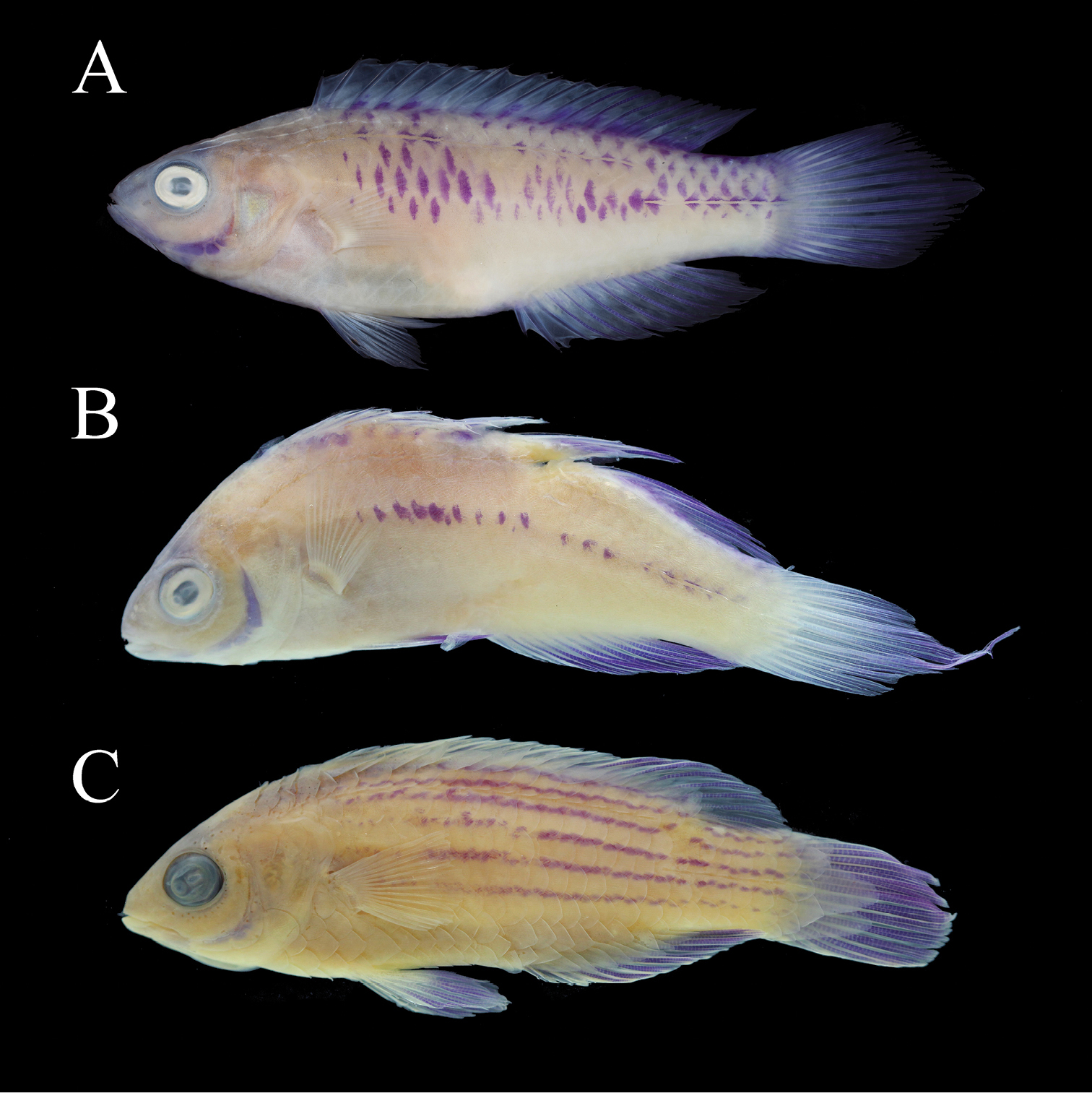
- Cirrhilabrus earlei - C (bottom)

Conservation status
- Least Concern (IUCN 3.1)

Scientific classification
- Kingdom: Animalia
- Phylum: Chordata
- Class: Actinopterygii
- Order: Labriformes
- Family: Labridae
- Genus: Cirrhilabrus
- Species: C. earlei

Binomial name
- Cirrhilabrus earlei Randall & Pyle, 2001

= Cirrhilabrus earlei =

Species of fish

Cirrhilabrus earlei is a species of fairy wrasse. They occur in the Western Central Pacific, Palau and Micronesia. In 2001 John Randall and Richard Pyle officially documented and described the species. Cirrhilabrus earlei is the known to the twilight reefs of Palau and the Majuro Atoll in the Marshall Islands. They live under depth range of 60–92 m, and its length is 6.9 cm SL. Male Cirrhilabrus earlei are adorned with sword-shaped tails, the tiny female species are same as male stimulates the male into the nuptial.
