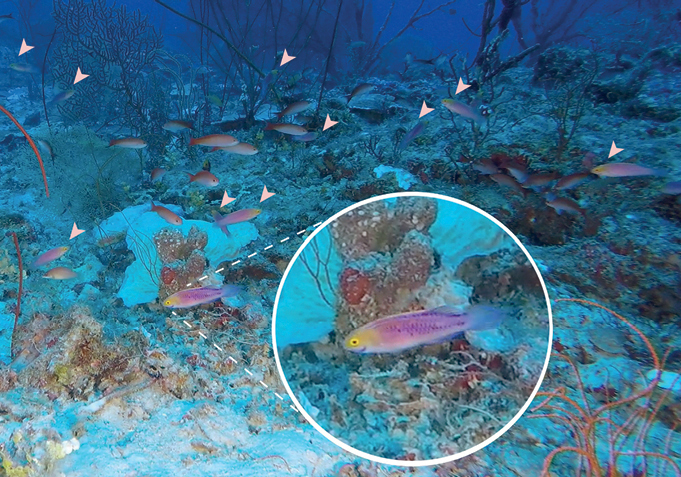
- Cirrhilabrus rubrisquamis (male in circular close-up, females marked by white arrows) and anthias

Conservation status
- Data Deficient (IUCN 3.1)

Scientific classification
- Kingdom: Animalia
- Phylum: Chordata
- Class: Actinopterygii
- Order: Labriformes
- Family: Labridae
- Genus: Cirrhilabrus
- Species: C. rubrisquamis

Binomial name
- Cirrhilabrus rubrisquamis J. E. Randall & Emery, 1983

= Rosy-scales fairy-wrasse =

Species of fish

The rosy-scales fairy-wrasse (Cirrhilabrus rubrisquamis), also known as the red velvet fairy wrasse, is a species of wrasse native to the Chagos Archipelago in the Indian Ocean. It is found at mesophotic reefs at depths between 41 and 70 m (135–230 ft).

Cirrhilabrus rubrisquamis can reach a standard length of 7.2 cm (2.8 in). It is considered data deficient by the IUCN, and is generally very poorly know, but it is possible that the similar C. wakanda (described as a new species from coastal East Africa in 2019) is a junior synonym of C. rubrisquamis. Conversely, C. rubrisquamis was formerly considered to occur in the Maldives and Sri Lanka, but in 2022 this population was described as a new species C. finifenmaa.
