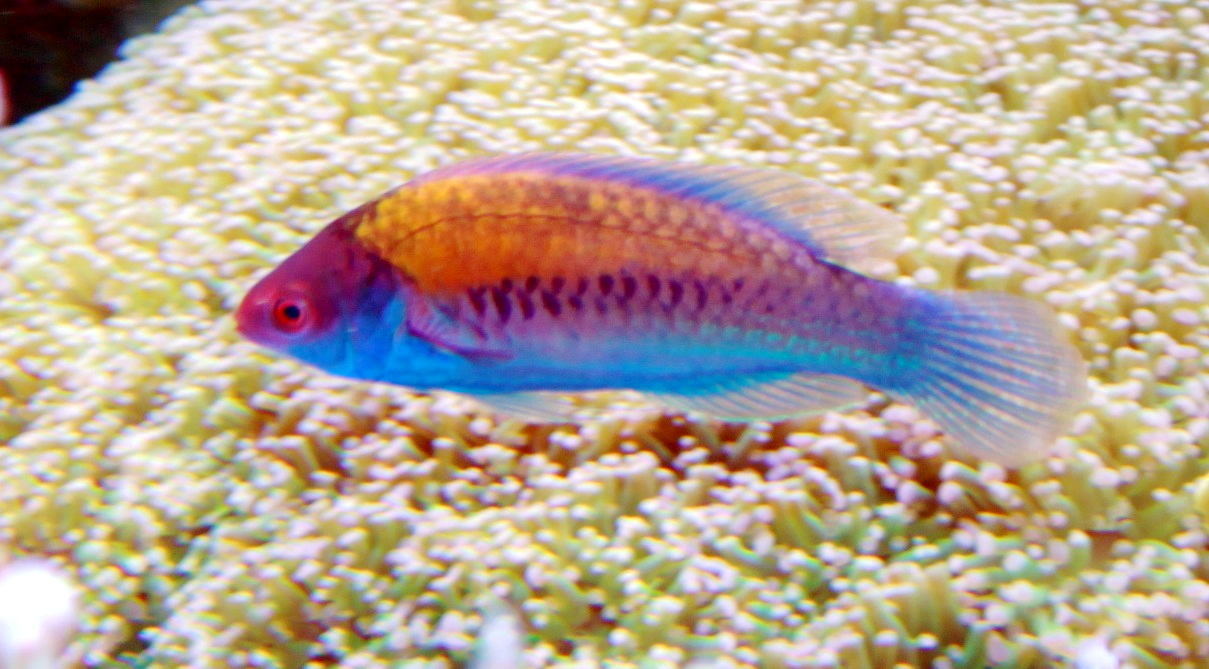

Conservation status
- Data Deficient (IUCN 3.1)

Scientific classification
- Kingdom: Animalia
- Phylum: Chordata
- Class: Actinopterygii
- Order: Labriformes
- Family: Labridae
- Genus: Cirrhilabrus
- Species: C. cyanopleura

Binomial name
- Cirrhilabrus cyanopleura (Bleeker, 1851)

Synonyms
- Cheilinoides cyanopleura Bleeker, 1851; Cirrhilabrus heterodon Bleeker, 1871; Cirrhilabrus lyukyuensis Ishikawa, 1904

= Blueside wrasse =

Species of fish

The blueside wrasse (Cirrhilabrus cyanopleura) is a species of wrasse native to the eastern Indian Ocean and the western Pacific Ocean. It is found on reefs in schools swimming 1 to 2 m (3.3 to 6.6 ft) above the bottom. It occurs at depths from 2 to 30 m (6.6 to 98.4 ft), most often between 5 and 20 m (16 and 66 ft). This species can reach a standard length of 15 cm (5.9 in). It can be found in the aquarium trade.

It feeds on zooplankton. It may be relatively common but declining because of threats: blast fishing, sedimentation, pollution, collection for the aquarium trade and habitat loss of shallow reefs.
