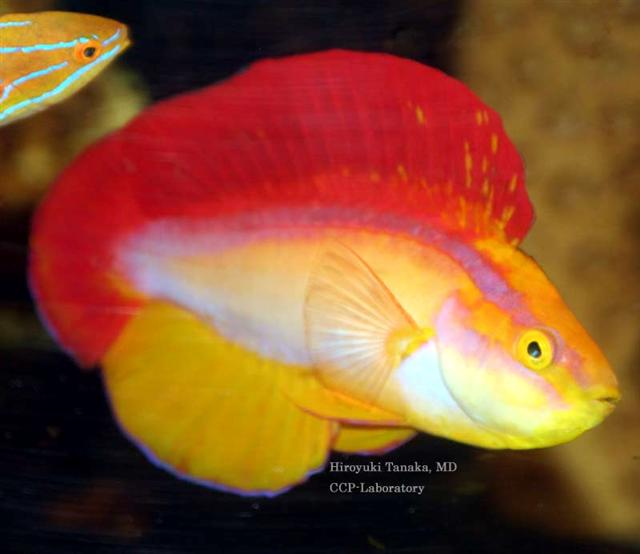

Conservation status
- Least Concern (IUCN 3.1)

Scientific classification
- Kingdom: Animalia
- Phylum: Chordata
- Class: Actinopterygii
- Order: Labriformes
- Family: Labridae
- Genus: Cirrhilabrus
- Species: C. jordani

Binomial name
- Cirrhilabrus jordani Snyder, 1904

= Cirrhilabrus jordani =

Species of fish

Cirrhilabrus jordani, commonly called the flame, the fairy, or velvet wrasse, or some combination of those names, is a species of wrasse endemic to the Hawaiian Islands where it is found in groups on coral reefs at depths from 5 to 186 m (16 to 610 ft), though mostly above 30 m (98 ft). It can reach a length of 10 cm (3.9 in). The males have a bright golden body with red ornamentation on the fins. The females typically do not have quite as bold markings as the males.

== Diet ==
Cirrhilabrus jordani feeds on zooplankton.

== Distribution and habitat ==
Cirrhilabrus jordani is endemic to the Hawaiian Islands, Johnston Islands, and Midway Atoll. It is usually found at depths of 20 m (66 ft) or more, close to walls, over debris zones, and fore-reef slopes.

== Human use ==
It is used in the aquarium trade.

== Etymology ==
The specific name honors the American ichthyologist David Starr Jordan.
