= Cirrhilabrus sanguineus =

Conservation status
- Least Concern (IUCN 3.1)

Scientific classification
- Kingdom: Animalia
- Phylum: Chordata
- Class: Actinopterygii
- Order: Labriformes
- Family: Labridae
- Genus: Cirrhilabrus
- Species: C. sanguineus

Binomial name
- Cirrhilabrus sanguineus Cornic, 1987

Species of fish

Cirrhilabrus sanguineus, the red-blotched fairy-wrasse, is a species of wrasse native to the coral reefs of the Mauritius. This species can reach a standard length of 6.7 cm (2.6 in). It occurs at depths from 40 to 60 m (130 to 200 ft). It can be found in the aquarium trade.
