= Cirrhilabrus blatteus =

Conservation status
- Least Concern (IUCN 3.1)

Scientific classification
- Kingdom: Animalia
- Phylum: Chordata
- Class: Actinopterygii
- Order: Labriformes
- Family: Labridae
- Genus: Cirrhilabrus
- Species: C. blatteus

Binomial name
- Cirrhilabrus blatteus V. G. Springer & J. E. Randall, 1974

Species of fairy wrasse

Cirrhilabrus blatteus or the purple-boned wrasse is a species of fairy wrasse native to the coasts of Egypt, Eritrea, Israel, Jordan, Saudi Arabia, Sudan, and Yemen in the Gulf of Aqaba. The species can be found at depths of 40 to 50 meters.

== Etymology ==
The species is named for its purple fins, as blatteus is Latin for the color purple. The fins are stained purple using alcohol, which makes it unique in its genus. The fins are not purple when the fish are alive.

== Description ==
The species can grow up to 6.3 inches or 16 centimeters. Males are known for a purple stripe that runs down the length of the body. The caudal fin is yellow. The species thrive in temperatures of 71.6–82.4 degrees Fahrenheit (22–28 degrees Celsius).

== Biology ==
Cirrhilabrus blatteus is found above rock and coral bottoms, usually within 1-2m of the substrate where it feeds on zooplankton. The males hold territories and guard herams of females.
