= Kent Carpenter =

American marine biologist (1953–2026)

- Born: Kent Edward Carpenter; January 20, 1953; Camillus, New York
- Died: July 12, 2026 (aged 73); Sibulan, Negros Oriental, Philippines
- Cause of death: Gunshot
- Education: Florida Institute of Technology (BS 1975); University of Hawaii, Manoa (PhD 1985)
- Known for: Biodiversity research at the Verde Island Passage
- Spouse: Cecilia Luz Minsalan
- Children: 2
- Scientific career
- Fields: Marine biology
- Workplaces: Old Dominion University; Silliman University
- Thesis: A taxonomic revision of the Indo-Pacific fish family Caesionidae (Perciformes: lutjanoidea) with comparisons of numerical evolutionary systematic, phylogenetic, and phenetic classifications (1985)
- Doctoral advisor: John Ernest Randall
- Other academic advisors: Angel C. Alcala

Kent Edward Carpenter (January 20, 1953 – July 12, 2026) was an American marine biologist based in the Philippines and Norfolk, Virginia, known for his research in tropical ichthyology and marine biodiversity mostly in the Philippines.

== Early life and education ==
Kent Carpenter was born on January 20, 1953 in Camillus, New York where he attended West Genesee High School. He earned his bachelor's degree in marine biology at Florida Institute of Technology in 1975 and his doctorate degree in zoology at the University of Hawaiʻi in 1985 studying with ichthyologist Jack Randall.

== Career ==
After graduating from Florida Tech, Carpenter joined the U.S. Peace Corps and was assigned in the Philippines in 1975 at age 22. He was tasked to work with the Bureau of Fisheries and Aquatic Resources (BFAR) to undertake coral reef research. He earned an instructor's certificate and trained BFAR fisheries researchers to scuba dive as a means to assess fish populations on coral reefs.

Carpenter had been affiliated with Silliman University (SU) since 1976, having worked with the institution's researchers to study the Philippines' marine ecosystem. This included Angel C. Alcala, who later became a national scientist. As his work in the Philippines progressed, Carpenter was appointed as a faculty member at SU.

In the late 1980s until the 1990 Iraqi invasion of Kuwait, Carpenter served as a Food and Agriculture Organization researcher working with the Kuwaiti and other Gulf States governments on an inventory of marine species. He and some of his colleagues fled by car across the desert into Saudi Arabia and into Qatar to escape the invasion.

In 1996, Carpenter joined the Old Dominion University (ODU) in Norfolk, Virginia to serve as a professor of biological sciences. He was a member of the ODU faculty for three decades.

Carpenter is noted to have made distribution records for 2,983 marine species. Working alongside Victor Springer, Carpenter mapped their ranges across the Indo-Malay-Philippine archipelagic region. The highest concentration appeared in the central Philippines, specifically the Verde Island Passage which Carpenter has dubbed as the "Center of the Center" of marine shore-fish biodiversity. Carpenter and the Smithsonian Institution published a 2005 study noting the region's biodiversity. More recently Carpenter worked with a number of colleagues to survey the fish populations on the Tubbataha Reef and found them to be highly diverse and with a greater abundance of oceanic species than within reefs closer to most of the Philippine archipelagic island shores.

In 2015, Carpenter took part in the oral testimony during the merits hearing of the South China Sea Arbitration case. He provided expert written records on the adverse environmental impact of China's land reclamation and fishing practices in the South China Sea.

Carpenter's more recent work was an effort to compare archived samples of fish sampled and archived during the 1907 to 1910 Albatross Expedition in which marine fish were collected from around the Philippine Archipelago and deposited in museums across the United States. He and colleagues began collecting fish of the exact same species and the exact locations in the early 2020s and by using up-to-date genomics techniques to investigate if over a century of fishing pressure had affected the genetic makeup of the fish populations.

A campaign to declare the Verde Island Passage as a World Heritage Site was launched on September 27, 2024, an initiative Carpenter has supported.

== Personal life ==
Carpenter was married to Cecilia Luz Minsalan, an Ilongga woman whom he met in the Philippines. They had two children. His family with Minsalan settled in Hampton Roads. Another Filipino woman, who was with Carpenter at the time of his death, is reportedly described as his live-in partner. Carpenter was a Tagalog speaker who also studied Vietnamese and Cebuano.

=== Death & investigation ===
On July 12, 2026, three assailants forcibly entered Carpenter's residence in the town of Sibulan in Negros Oriental, Philippines, and stole several of his belongings and money. Based upon interviews and security camera recordings, two alleged accomplices remained outside the home as lookouts. Carpenter was shot in the head by one of the men and was killed, while a Filipina companion of his was injured. On July 15, two suspects were arrested by the police, with the third surrendering the following day. Early morning on July 17, a fourth suspect surrendered to the police and the status of Carpenter's live-in companion had changed from a 'person of interest' to 'complainant-witness'. By July 17, five individuals were charged before the Negros Oriental Provincial Court for robbery and homicide, including the four individuals held in custody in addition to another individual who was still at-large. On July 20, it was reported that a sixth suspect was identified by police in Negros Oriental. Based in their investigations to date, police maintained that robbery remained the primary motive behind the killing, but the investigations were being continued.

Memorial services for Carpenter were held over a three-day period at Udarbe Chapel at Silliman University from July 20-21, 2026. At the time of his death, he was set to retire from ODU in September 2026.

== Legacy ==
=== Species named after Carpenter ===
Carpenter has two fish species named in his honor, Paracheilinus carpenteri Randall and Lubbock 1981, popularly known as "Carpenter's flasher wrasse", and Meganthias carpenteri Anderson 2006, popularly known as Carpenter's Yellowtop Jewelfish.

== Selected Publications ==
- Carpenter, K.E., F. Krupp, D.A. Jones, and U. Zajonz. (1997). Living marine resources of Kuwait, Eastern Saudi Arabia, Bahrain, Qatar, and the United Arab Emirates. FAO, Rome. 293pp. + 17 Color Plates.
- Carpenter, K.E. and V. G. Springer. (2005). The center of the center of marine shore fish biodiversity: the Philippine Islands. Environmental Biology of Fishes 72(4):467-480.
- Butchart, S.H.M., M. Walpole, B. Collen, A.V. Strein, J.P.W. Scharlemann, R.A.E. Almond, J.E.M. Baillie, B. Bornhard, C. Brown, J. Bruno, K.E. Carpenter, et al. (2010). Global biodiversity: indicators of recent declines. Science 328(5982):1164-1168.
- Nañola, C.L, P.M. Aliño, and K.E. Carpenter. (2011). Exploitation-related reef fish species richness depletion in the epicenter of marine biodiversity. Environmental Biology of Fishes 90(4):405-420.
- E.R. Selig, W.R. Turner, S. Troëng, B.P. Wallace, B.S. Halpern, K. Kaschner, B.G. Lascelles, K.E. Carpenter, R.A. Mittermeier. (2014). PLOS ONE 9(1):e82898.
- Fitz, K.S., R.A. Abesamis, J.G.P. Baldisimo, A.A. Bucol, R.D. Clark, E. Garcia, I.R. Lopez, K.E. Carpenter et al. (2006) Preservation of genetic diversity and selection over a century in a coral reef fish (Taeniamia zosterophora) in the Philippines. The American Naturalist 207(1):196-213.
- Gedoria, G.T., K, Stiefel, J.T. Williams, A.M. Songco, and K.E. Carpenter. (2026) The Fish Fauna of Tubbataha Reefs is highly Biodiverse and Distinctively Oceanic. EcoEvoRxiv. https://doi.org/10.32942/X2XM3B

== See also ==
- Category:Taxa named by Kent E. Carpenter
