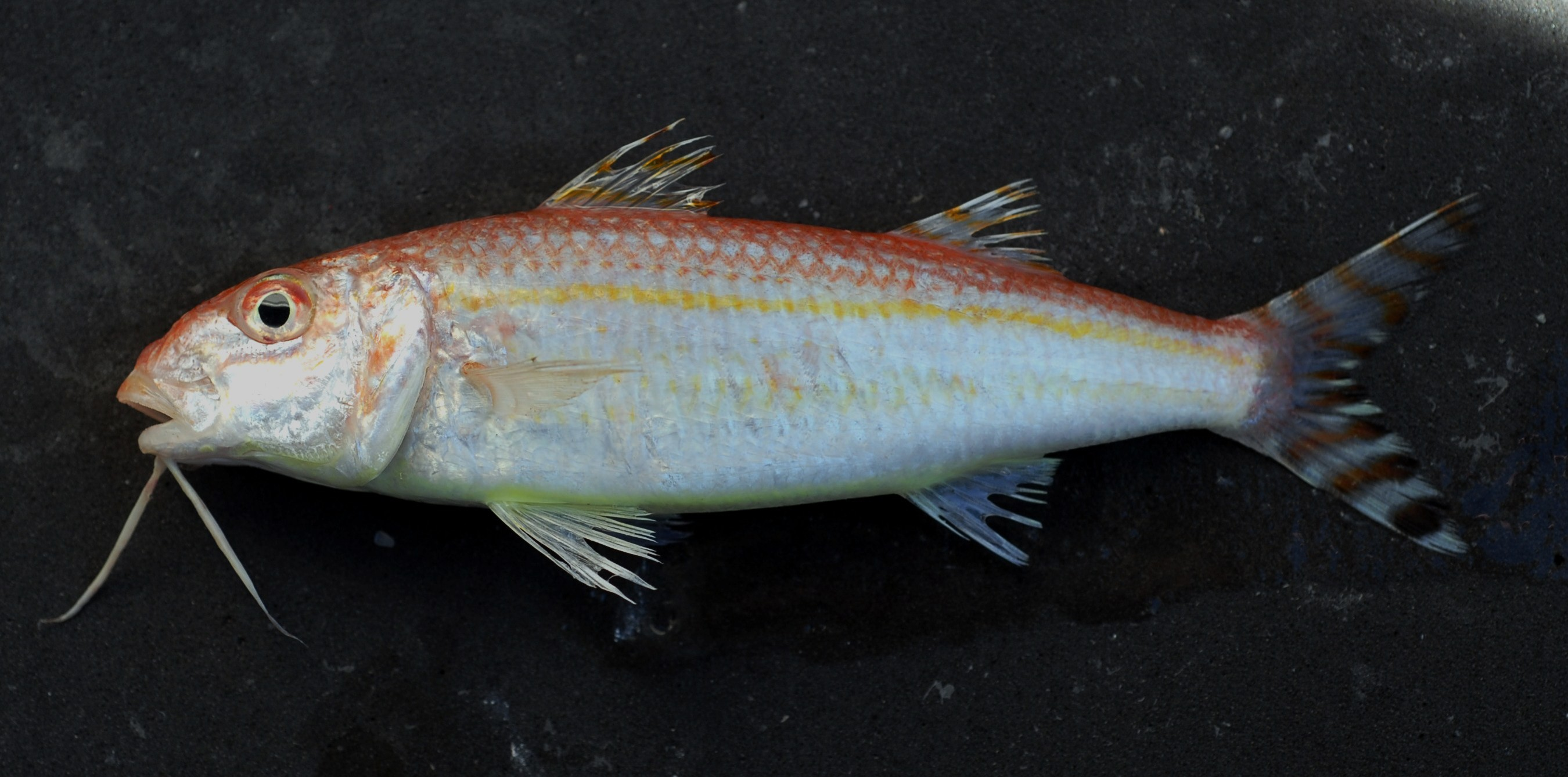
- Upeneus parvus

Scientific classification
- Kingdom: Animalia
- Phylum: Chordata
- Class: Actinopterygii
- Division: Teleostei
- Order: Syngnathiformes
- Family: Mullidae
- Genus: Upeneus; G. Cuvier, 1829

Type species
- Mullus vittatus Forsskål, 1775

Synonyms
- Hypeneus Agassiz, 1846; Upeneoides Bleeker, 1849; Megalepis Bianconi, 1857; Pennon Whitley, 1941

= Upeneus =

Genus of ray-finned fishes

Upeneus is a genus of goatfishes native to the Atlantic, Indian and Pacific oceans.

== Species ==
These are the currently recognized species in this genus:

- Upeneus asymmetricus Lachner, 1954 (Asymmetrical goatfish)
- Upeneus australiae B. J. Kim & Nakaya, 2002 (Australian goatfish)
- Upeneus caudofasciatus Uiblein & Gledhill, 2019
- Upeneus davidaromi Golani, 2001 (Darom's goatfish)
- Upeneus dimipavlov Ublien & Motomura, 2021 (Pavlov’s Goatfish)
- Upeneus doriae Günther, 1869 (Gilded goatfish)
- Upeneus elongatus Uiblein & Motomura, 2021 (Elongate Goatfish)
- Upeneus farnis Uiblein & Peristiwady, 2017 (Farnis' goatfish)
- Upeneus filifer J. D. Ogilby, 1910 (Pennant goatfish)
- Upeneus francisi J. E. Randall & Guézé, 1992 (Francis' goatfish)
- Upeneus gubal Uiblein, 2019
- Upeneus guttatus F. Day, 1868 (Two-tone goatfish)
- Upeneus heemstra Ublien & Gouws, 2014 (Heemstra goatfish)
- Upeneus heterospinus Uiblein & Pavlov, 2019
- Upeneus indicus Ublien & Heemstra, 2010 (Tall-fin goatfish)
- Upeneus itoui M. Yamashita, Golani & Motomura, 2011 (Oriental goatfish)
- Upeneus japonicus Houttuyn, 1782 (Japanese goatfish)
- Upeneus lombok Uiblein & W. T. White, 2015 (Lombok goatfish)
- Upeneus luzonius D. S. Jordan & Seale, 1907 (Dark-barred goatfish)
- Upeneus margarethae Uiblein & Heemstra, 2010 (Margaretha's goatfish)
- Upeneus mascareinsis Fourmanoir & Guézé, 1967 (Mascarene goatfish)
- Upeneus moluccensis Bleeker, 1855 (Goldband goatfish)
- Upeneus mouthami J. E. Randall & Kulbicki, 2006 (Moutham's goatfish)
- Upeneus niebuhri Guézé, 1967 (Niebuhr's goatfish)
- Upeneus nigromarginatus A. R. Bos, 2014 (Black-margined goatfish)
- Upeneus oligospilus Lachner, 1954 (Short-fin goatfish)
- Upeneus parvus Poey, 1852 (Dwarf goatfish)
- Upeneus pori Ben-Tuvia & Golani, 1989 (Por's goatfish)
- Upeneus quadrilineatus C. T. Cheng & C. X. Wang, 1963 (Four-stripe goatfish)
- Upeneus randalli Uiblein & Heemstra, 2011
- Upeneus saiab Uiblein & Lisher, 2013 (Saiab goatfish)
- Upeneus seychellensis Uiblein & Heemstra, 2011 (Tailstripe goatfish)
- Upeneus spottocaudalis Uiblein & Gledhill, 2017 (Tailspot goatfish)
- Upeneus stenopsis Uiblein & McGrouther, 2012 (Narrowtail goatfish)
- Upeneus suahelicus Uiblein & Heemstra, 2010 (Swahili goatfish)
- Upeneus subvittatus Temminck & Schlegel, 1843 (Deep-water goatfish)
- Upeneus sulphureus G. Cuvier, 1829 (Sulphur goatfish)
- Upeneus sundaicus Bleeker, 1855 (Ochrebanded goatfish)
- Upeneus supravittatus Uiblein & Heemstra, 2010 (Long-fin goatfish)
- Upeneus taeniopterus G. Cuvier, 1829 (Finstripe goatfish)
- Upeneus torres Uiblein & Gledhill, 2015 (Torres goatfish)
- Upeneus tragula J. Richardson, 1846 (Freckled goatfish)
- Upeneus vanuatu Uiblein & Causse, 2013 (Yellowstriped goatfish)
- Upeneus willwhite Uiblein & Motomura, 2021 (White’s Goatfish) Etymology. It honours the ichthyologist Dr. William T. White, of the Australian National Fish Collection, CSIRO National Research Collections Australia, in Hobart, Australia, for collecting and photographing mullid specimens from South Indonesia and making them available for taxonomic research (including the types specimens of Upeneus willwhite.
- Upeneus xanthogrammus C. H. Gilbert, 1892
