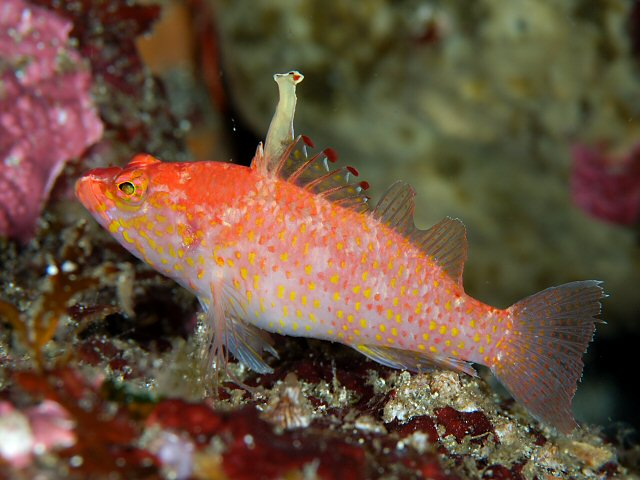
- Plectranthias altipinnatus
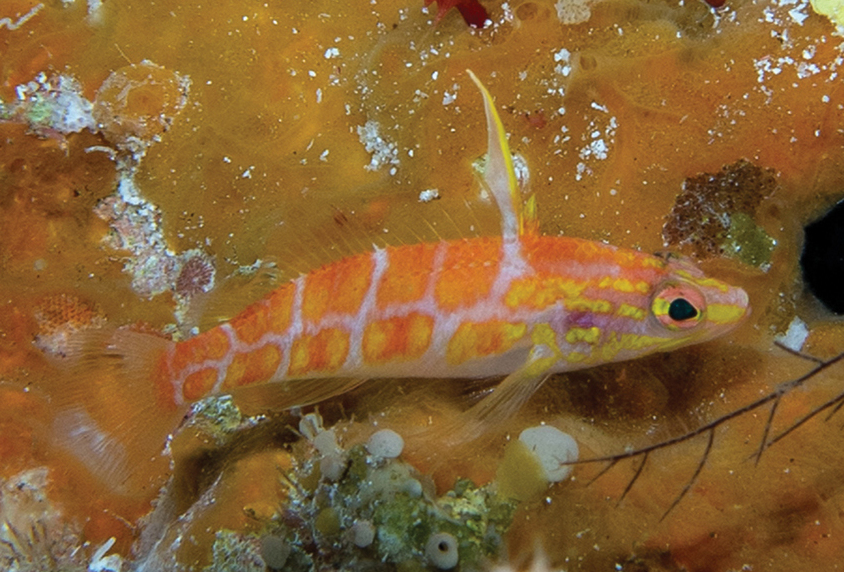
- Plectranthias polygonius

Scientific classification
- Kingdom: Animalia
- Phylum: Chordata
- Class: Actinopterygii
- Division: Teleostei
- Order: Perciformes
- Family: Anthiadidae
- Genus: Plectranthias; Bleeker, 1873

Type species
- Plectropoma anthioides Günther, 1872

= Plectranthias =

Genus of fishes

Plectranthias is a genus of ray-finned fish in the subfamily Anthiinae, part of the family Anthiadidae, the anthias or fairy basslets. They are found in the Atlantic, Indian and Pacific Ocean.

== Species ==
These are the currently recognized species in this genus:

- Plectranthias ahiahiata Shepherd, Phelps, Pinheiro, Perez-Matus & Rocha, 2018
- Plectranthias alleni J. E. Randall, 1980 (Allen's perchlet)
- Plectranthias altipinnatus Katayama & Masuda, 1980
- Plectranthias anthioides (Günther, 1872)
- Plectranthias bauchotae J. E. Randall, 1980
- Plectranthias bilaticlavia Paulin & C. D. Roberts, 1987
- Plectranthias cirrhitoides J. E. Randall, 1980
- Plectranthias cruentus A. C. Gill & C. D. Roberts. 2020
- Plectranthias elaine Heemstra & J. E. Randall, 2009
- Plectranthias exsul Heemstra & W. D. Anderson, 1983
- Plectranthias flammeus J. T. Williams, Delrieu-Trottin & Planes, 2013 (Flame perchlet)
- Plectranthias fourmanoiri J. E. Randall, 1980 (Double-spot perchlet)
- Plectranthias gardineri (Regan, 1908)
- Plectranthias garrupellus C. R. Robins & Starck, 1961 (Apricot perchlet)
- Plectranthias helenae J. E. Randall, 1980
- Plectranthias inermis J. E. Randall, 1980 (Checkered perchlet)
- Plectranthias intermedius (Kotthaus, 1973)
- Plectranthias jothyi J. E. Randall, 1996
- Plectranthias kamii J. E. Randall, 1980
- Plectranthias kelloggi (D. S. Jordan & Evermann, 1903)
- Plectranthias klausewitzi Zajonz, 2006
- Plectranthias knappi J. E. Randall, 1996
- Plectranthias longimanus (M. C. W. Weber, 1913) (Long-fin perchlet)
- Plectranthias maculicauda (Regan, 1914) (Spot-tail perchlet)
- Plectranthias nanus J. E. Randall, 1980 (Bown-band perchlet)
- Plectranthias nazcae W. D. Anderson, 2008 (Red perchlet)
- Plectranthias pallidus J. E. Randall & Hoese, 1995 (Pale perchlet)
- Plectranthias parini W. D. Anderson & J. E. Randall, 1991 (Parin's perchlet)
- Plectranthias pelicieri J. E. Randall & Shimizu, 1994
- Plectranthias polygonius Shepherd, Phelps, Pinheiro, Rocha & Rocha 2020 (Polygon Perchlet)
- Plectranthias purpuralepis Tang, Lai & Ho, 2020
- Plectranthias randalli Fourmanoir & Rivaton, 1980
- Plectranthias retrofasciatus Fourmanoir & J. E. Randall, 1979
- Plectranthias rubrifasciatus Fourmanoir & J. E. Randall, 1979
- Plectranthias sheni J. P. Chen & K. T. Shao, 2002
- Plectranthias taylori J. E. Randall, 1980
- Plectranthias wheeleri J. E. Randall, 1980 (Spotted perchlet)
- Plectranthias whiteheadi J. E. Randall, 1980
- Plectranthias winniensis (J. C. Tyler, 1966) (Red-blotch perchlet)
- Plectranthias yamakawai Yoshino, 1972
