= Plectranthias sheni =

Scientific classification
- Domain: Eukaryota
- Kingdom: Animalia
- Phylum: Chordata
- Class: Actinopterygii
- Order: Perciformes
- Family: Anthiadidae
- Genus: Plectranthias
- Species: P. sheni

Binomial name
- Plectranthias sheni J. P. Chen & K. T. Shao, 2002

Species of fish

Plectranthias sheni is a species of marine fish belonging to the family Serranidae. It has only been recorded off the coast of Taiwan. Although only recently described, examples of this fish have been known for some time but have been misidentified as the more widespread species Plectranthias anthioides and Plectranthias kamii.

This is a deep-bodied fish with large mouth and eyes, growing up to 11 cm standard length. Its general colouring is yellowish-pink with a yellow head and two rows of irregular dark golden blotches along the body. The fins are generally yellow with darker basal areas on the first dorsal and pectoral fins. The first dorsal fin has spiked rays, the third being the longest.

== Etymology ==
The fish is named in honor of Shieh-Chieh Shen, of the National Taiwan University, who obtained the holotype and most of the paratype specimens and deposited them at his university.
