= Scombrosphyraena =

Scombrosphyraena Temporal range: Lower Eocene

Scientific classification
- Kingdom: Animalia
- Phylum: Chordata
- Class: Actinopterygii
- Order: Perciformes
- Genus: †Scombrosphyraena; Fourmanoir, 1970

Extinct genus of fishes

Scombrosphyraena is an extinct genus of prehistoric bony fish that lived during the lower Eocene.

== See also ==
- Prehistoric fish
- List of prehistoric bony fish
