= Upeneus stenopsis =

Scientific classification
- Kingdom: Animalia
- Phylum: Chordata
- Class: Actinopterygii
- Order: Syngnathiformes
- Family: Mullidae
- Genus: Upeneus
- Species: U. stenopsis

Binomial name
- Upeneus stenopsis Uiblein & McGrouther, 2012

Species of goatfish

Upeneus stenopsis, the narrowtail goatfish, is a deep-water goatfish of the genus Upeneus. It was first described by Uiblein & McGrouther in 2012. It is the first known recorded deep-water species of Upeneus to be in found in the Pacific Ocean.

== Etymology ==
The species name stenopsis is a portmanteau of two ancient Greek words: stenós (στενός; "tight") and ópsĭs (ὄψις; "appearance"), referring to this species' distinctively narrow (both in depth and width) caudal peduncle from other Upeneus species.

== Distribution and habitat ==
Upeneus stenopsis's known habitat is the north and northeastern coasts of Australia and Quezon, Philippines, presiding in depths between 127 and 275 meters.

== Description ==
The longest recorded length of a specimen of U. stenopsis is 13.1 cm. In its fresh state, it has a silver grey appearance, with a red tint on the top, and white on the belly. It has black frontal fin tips, and has about 7 to 9 oblique rays on the tail fin; 5 rays on the upper lobe, 4 rays on the lower lobe, with hyaline-colored interspaces between each stripe.

A single juvenile U. stepnosis specimen found in Quezon was noted to overlap many of the same characteristics as 4 other adult specimens.

== Characterization ==
Upeneus stenopsis was added into a vittatus (banded-fish) group consisting of Upeneus davidaromi, Upeneus mascareinsis, Upeneus subvittatus, Upeneus vittatus and Upeneus vanuatu, characterized by their shared features, including: number of gill rakers on lower limb, caudal-peduncle depth, interorbital length, and interdorsal distance.

Upeneus stenopsis is most closely related to the species Upeneus davidaromi, Upeneus mascareinsis, and Upeneus subvittatus, as they share no lateral body stripes in life, a shallow caudal peduncle, and a long head with long jaws and large eyes.
