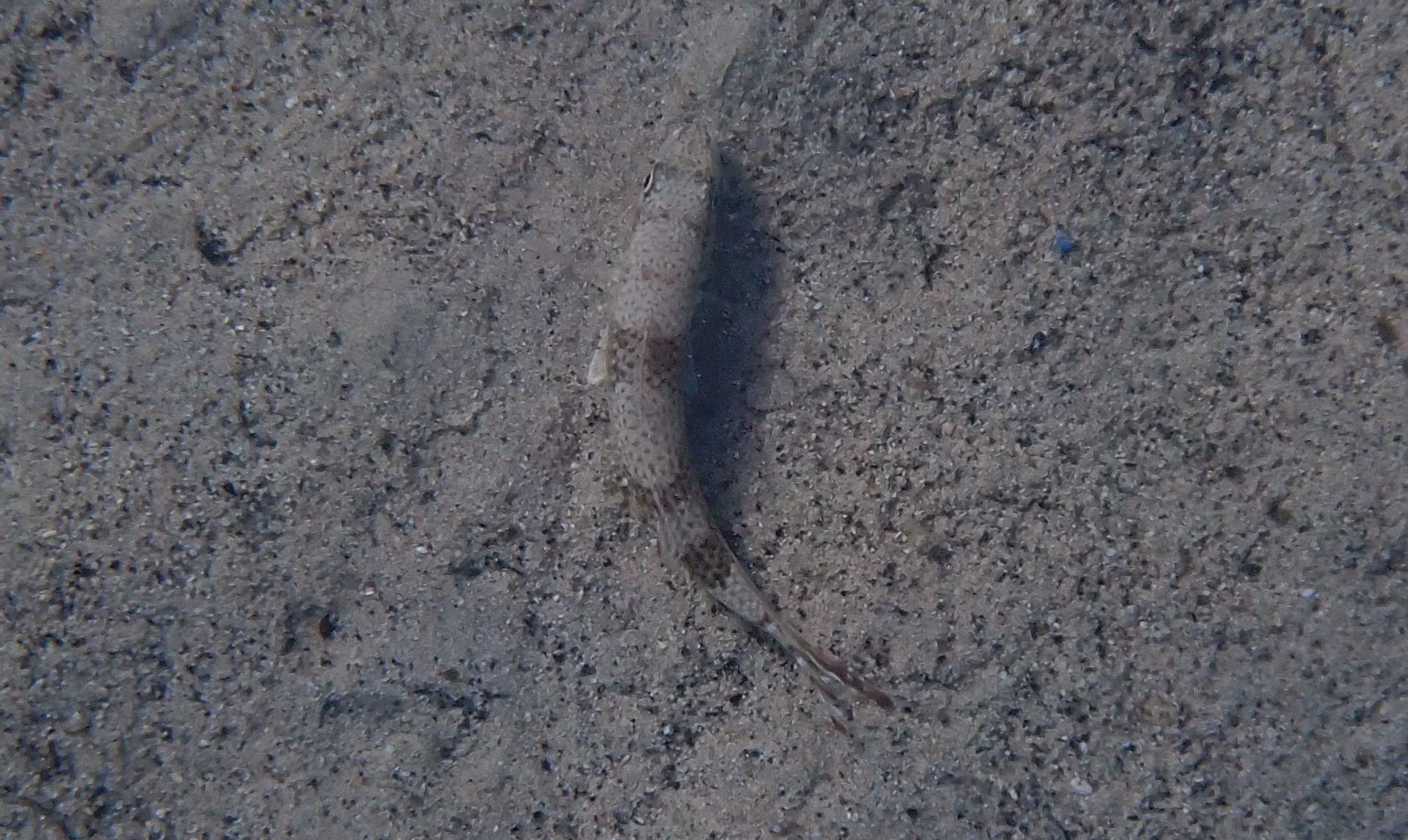

Conservation status
- Least Concern (IUCN 3.1)

Scientific classification
- Kingdom: Animalia
- Phylum: Chordata
- Class: Actinopterygii
- Order: Syngnathiformes
- Family: Mullidae
- Genus: Upeneus
- Species: U. pori

Binomial name
- Upeneus pori Ben-Tuvia & Golani, 1989

= Upeneus pori =

Species of fish

Upeneus pori (Por's goatfish) is a species of marine ray-finned fish, a goatfish from the family Mullidae which is found in western Indian Ocean and the eastern Mediterranean Sea.

== Description ==
Upeneus pori has an elongated body and a rounded snout. The body is greyish or red-brown, darker on the back, and covered with grey or reddish brown spots which go as far as the lower flanks but with no or a very faint lateral stripe visible in freh specimens. There is a dark brown or red bar which runs vertically through the eye and the barbels located on the chin are white or yellow. The first dorsal fin is colourless. The caudal fin is marked with a total of 11–15 bars with 4–6 reddish brown bars on the upper lobe and 6–9 red-brown or grey bars on the lower part of the lower lobe which extend to form a broad brown or dark grey stripe along middle of lobe. There are also 3–4 brownish-red or grey bars on inner, upper half of lower lobe, these bars are normally visible on preserved specimens. The dorsal fins have a total of 7 spines and 9 soft rays while the anal fin has a single spine and 7 soft rays. This fish attains a standard length of 19 centimetres (7.5 in).

== Distribution ==
Upeneus pori occurs naturally in the Red Sea and into the north western Indian Ocean as far east as the southern coast of Oman. It has also been found off Madagascar in the southwestern Indian Ocean. It is now very abundant in the eastern Mediterranean Sea where it was recorded as early as 1950, following its migration through the Suez Canal, and has spread recently as far west as Tunisia and Sicily.

== Habitat and biology ==
Upeneus pori feeds on benthic invertebrates buried in the substrate, particularly crustaceans and, somewhat on polychaetes. They use their barbels, like other goatfishes, to detect prey. In the Mediterranean its spawning season lasts from April to September.

== Taxonomy and etymology ==
Upeneus pori was first formally described in 1989 by Adam Ben Tuvia and Daniel Golani with the type locality given as Eilat on the Gulf of Aqaba and was subsequently found to occur in the eastern Mediterranean Sea. The authors honoured the hydrobiologist and biogeographer Francis Dov Por (1927-2014) of the Hebrew University of Jerusalem in recognition of contribution to the study of Lessepsian migration, of which U.pori is part.

U. pori is a member of the japonicus species group within the genus Upeneus along with U. asymmetricus, U. australasiae, U. farnis, U. francisi, U. guttatus, U. japonicus, U. itoui, U. lombo, U. parvus, U. spottocaudalis and U. torres .
