= Plectranthias rubrifasciatus =

Conservation status
- Least Concern (IUCN 3.1)

Scientific classification
- Kingdom: Animalia
- Phylum: Chordata
- Class: Actinopterygii
- Order: Perciformes
- Family: Anthiadidae
- Genus: Plectranthias
- Species: P. rubrifasciatus

Binomial name
- Plectranthias rubrifasciatus Fourmanoir & J. E. Randall, 1979

Species of fish

Plectranthias rubrifasciatus is a species of fish in the family Serranidae occurring in the western-central Pacific Ocean.

== Size ==
This species reaches a length of 4.9 cm (1.9 in).
