= Upeneus mascareinsis =

Conservation status
- Least Concern (IUCN 3.1)

Scientific classification
- Kingdom: Animalia
- Phylum: Chordata
- Class: Actinopterygii
- Order: Syngnathiformes
- Family: Mullidae
- Genus: Upeneus
- Species: U. mascareinsis

Binomial name
- Upeneus mascareinsis Fourmanoir & Guézé, 1967

Species of fish

Upeneus mascareinsis, the Mascarene goatfish, is a species of marine ray-finned fish belonging to the family Mullidae, the goatfishes, which is found in the Indian Ocean.

== Description ==
Upeneus mascareinsis has dorsal fins which have a total of 8 spines and 9 soft rays. The pectoral fins have 15–16 soft rays. The gill raker counts are 7–8 + 19–22. There are 35–38 scales in the lateral line. The body has a depth of 22–26% of the standard length at the base of the origin of the dorsal fin and of 18–22% of the standard length it the anus. The caudal peduncle has a depth of 8.3–9.3% of the standard length. Its barbels are 18–24% of the standard length. There are 7–10 total bars on caudal fin, 3–6 bars on the upper lobe which are pale brown near the base and dark brown to black towards the margin while the lower lobe has 3–4 brown bars which darken towards the margin and the last 2 bars being completely dark brown or black and widening towards the margin. There is a small bar on the tip of the lower lobe. The width of biggest lower caudal-fin lobe bar and/or the space between outermost bars is less than the diameter of the orbit. They do not have any flank stripes and the tip of first dorsal-fin is dark. The barbels are white as is the belly while the flanks are rose-red darkening towards the back where there is some gold iridescence along the upper flanks and a dark saddle to the rear of the second dorsal fin. The body is uniformly brown, with a little dorsal darkening, with the bars and black first dorsal-fin tip still visible in preserved fish. This species attains a standard length of 18 centimetres (7.1 in).

== Distribution ==
Upeneus mascareinsis occurs in the waters off Mozambique, Mauritius, Réunion and western Indonesia.

== Habitat and biology ==
Upeneusmascareinsis has been found at depths of 100 to 400 metres (330 to 1,310 ft) and is therefore considered to be a species of the lower continental shelf and upper continental slope in the Indian Ocean.

== Taxonomy ==
Upeneus mascareinsis is a member of the vittatus species group along with U. davidaromi, U. indicus, U. subvittatus, U. suahelicus, U. supravittatus and U. vittatus. It was originally described in 1967 by Pierre Fourmanoir and Paul Guézé from a type found at Réunion.
