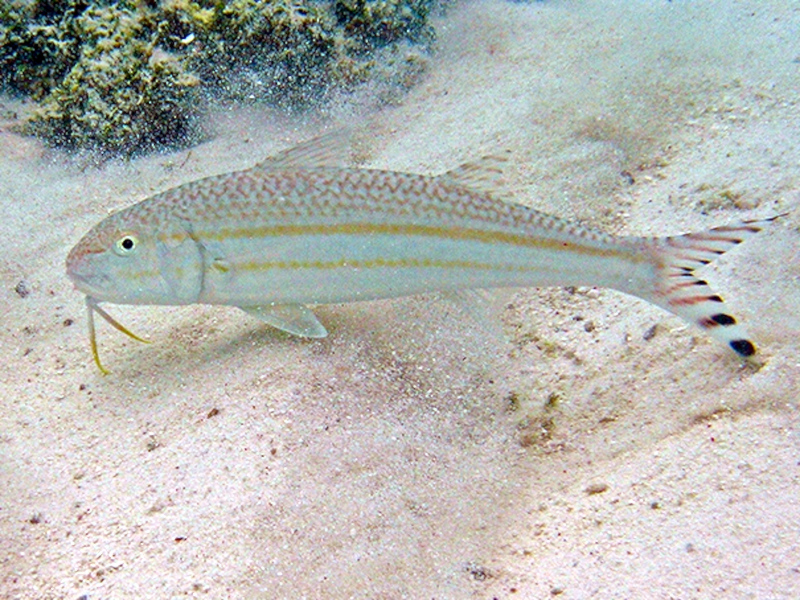

Conservation status
- Least Concern (IUCN 3.1)

Scientific classification
- Kingdom: Animalia
- Phylum: Chordata
- Class: Actinopterygii
- Order: Syngnathiformes
- Family: Mullidae
- Genus: Upeneus
- Species: U. taeniopterus

Binomial name
- Upeneus taeniopterus Cuvier, 1829

Synonyms
- Upeneus arge

= Upeneus taeniopterus =

Species of ray-finned fish

Upeneus taeniopterus is a species of ray-finned fish in the family Mullidae, the goatfishes. It is known commonly as the finstripe goatfish. It is a marine fish native to the Indo-Pacific region.

This species reaches about 33 centimeters long. It is pale grey in color with many small reddish patches along the dorsal surface of the body. There is a horizontal stripe from eye to tail and a paler stripe below. The tail fin has dark bars.

This fish is associated with reefs, and is usually found in shallow waters.

The fish has been reported to be hallucinogenic when consumed; however, it is commercially fished for food, generally being made into mince and other processed products.

This species has a wide distribution and is not considered to be threatened.
