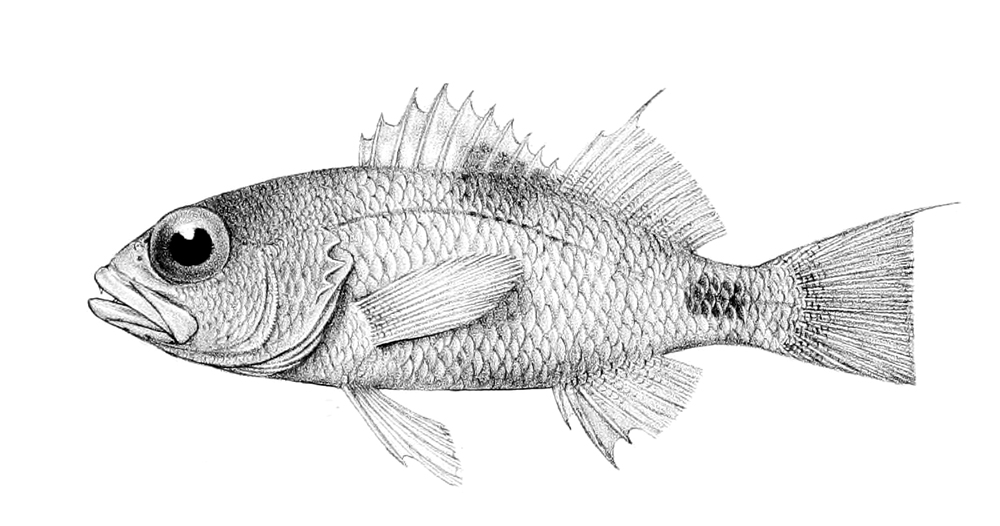

Scientific classification
- Domain: Eukaryota
- Kingdom: Animalia
- Phylum: Chordata
- Class: Actinopterygii
- Order: Perciformes
- Family: Anthiadidae
- Genus: Plectranthias
- Species: P. maculicauda

Binomial name
- Plectranthias maculicauda (Regan, 1914)

Synonyms
- Serranops maculicauda Regan, 1914

= Plectranthias maculicauda =

Species of fish

Plectranthias maculicauda, commonly known as the spot-tail perchlet, is a species of fish in the family Serranidae found in the southwestern Pacific Ocean.

== Size ==
This species reaches a length of 8.3 cm (3.3 in).
