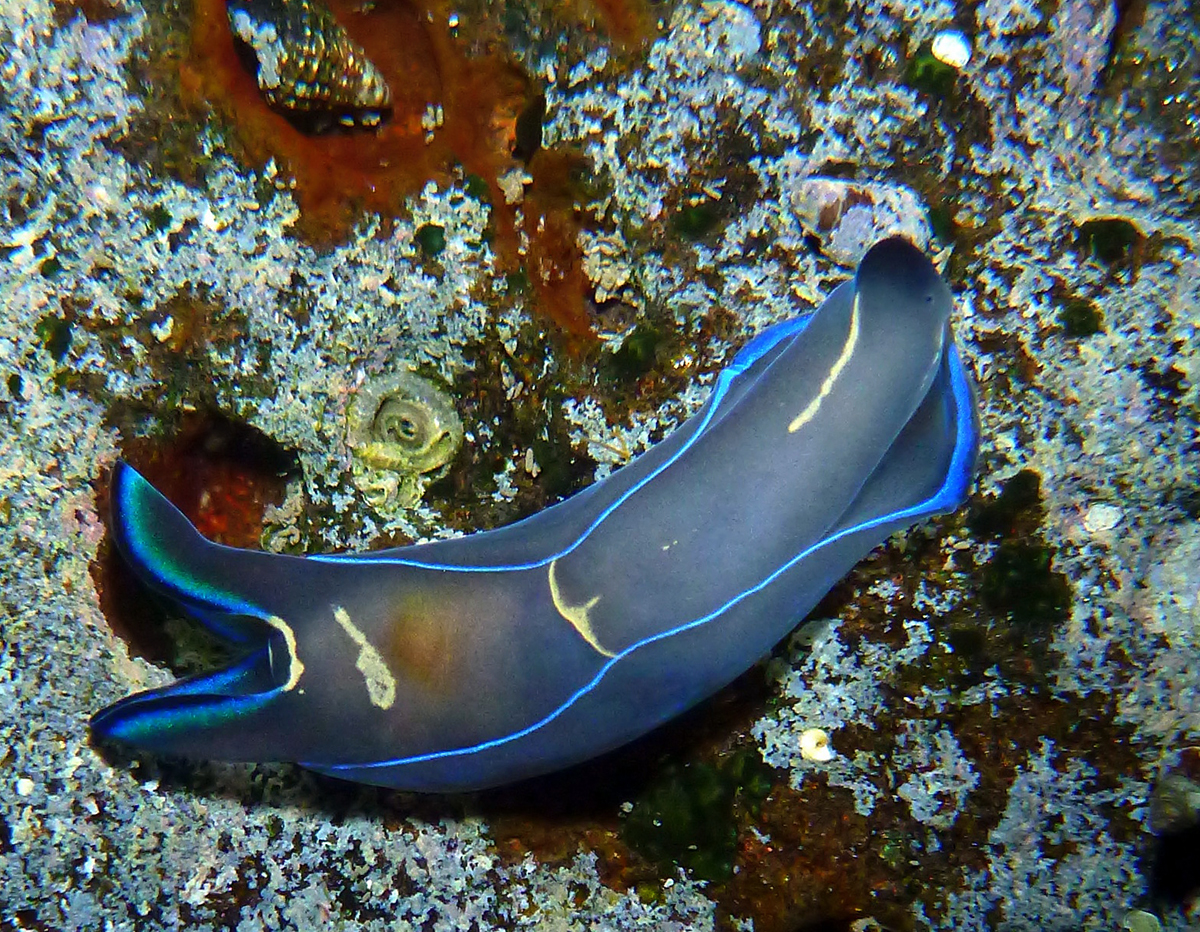

Scientific classification
- Kingdom: Animalia
- Phylum: Mollusca
- Class: Gastropoda
- Order: Cephalaspidea
- Family: Aglajidae
- Genus: Tubulophilinopsis
- Species: T. gardineri

Binomial name
- Tubulophilinopsis gardineri (Eliot, 1903)

Synonyms
- Aglaja splendida Marcus, 1965; Doridium gardineri Eliot, 1903; Philinopsis gardineri (Eliot, 1903)

= Tubulophilinopsis gardineri =

Species of gastropod

Tubulophilinopsis gardineri, the Gardiner’s philinopsis, or Gardiner's headshield slug is a species of sea slug, a shell-less opisthobranch gastropod mollusc in the family Aglajidae. It is native to the Indo-Pacific region.

== Etymology ==
Tubulophilinopsis gardineri is named after collector of the type series, (John) Stanley Gardiner.

== Description ==
Tubulophilinopsis gardineri is a moderately large sea slug, growing to a length of about 70 mm (3 in). It is relatively broad compared to its length, and has a broad headshield with a pronounced hump. This has a pointed posterior end, but this can appear nearly straight when the animal is moving around. The headshield is used for digging and burrowing into the substrate. Behind the headshield is a body shield which contains the remnants of a thin shell, and bears two, rounded lobes at the back. On either side of the body are lateral outgrowths known as parapodia which curve in towards the centre of the body. The colour of this sea slug is very distinctive, being dark brown or black, with a thin, bright blue margin to the shields, posterior lobes and parapodia. There are sometimes a few white or yellow lines on the dorsal surface of the body. This sea slug could be confused with Chelidonura varians which has very similar colouring, but has the lobes at the back of the body shield drawn out into long pointed tips, the left one always being longer than the right. Another similar species is Philinopsis speciosa, but it lacks the distinctive hump on the head, and has a notable pointed extension at the back of its headshield.

== Distribution and habitat ==
Tubulophilinopsis gardineri is native to shallow water in the Indo-Pacific region, its range extending from South Africa and Tanzania, to Japan and Fiji. It occurs on sandy or muddy substrates and its depth range is down to about 10 m (33 ft).

== Ecology ==
All the members of the family Aglajidae are predators; Tubulophilinopsis gardineri is diurnal and probably feeds on polychaete worms and other sea slugs. It can move quite rapidly, and can follow the mucus trail left by a sea slug, detecting it by means of sensory hairs beside its mouth. It has no radula, but may evert its mouth cavity and suck up its prey; it is this part of the gut that forms the hump on the head when retracted.

Like other members of the family Aglajidae, this sea slug is a hermaphrodite; having encountered each other, two individuals simultaneously transfer sperm to each other. The egg masses contain 5,000 to 70,000 eggs in strands, clumped together to form a balloon-shaped mass which is anchored to the substrate by a mucus filament. The eggs hatch after four to ten days.
