= Plectranthias intermedius =

Conservation status
- Data Deficient (IUCN 3.1)

Scientific classification
- Kingdom: Animalia
- Phylum: Chordata
- Class: Actinopterygii
- Order: Perciformes
- Family: Anthiadidae
- Genus: Plectranthias
- Species: P. intermedius

Binomial name
- Plectranthias intermedius (Kotthaus, 1973)

Synonyms
- Xenanthias intermedius Kotthaus, 1973

Species of fish

Plectranthias intermedius is a species of fish in the family Serranidae occurring in the western Indian Ocean.

== Size ==
This species reaches a length of 8.9 cm (3.5 in).
