= Plectranthias wheeleri =

Scientific classification
- Kingdom: Animalia
- Phylum: Chordata
- Class: Actinopterygii
- Order: Perciformes
- Family: Anthiadidae
- Genus: Plectranthias
- Species: P. wheeleri

Binomial name
- Plectranthias wheeleri J. E. Randall, 1980

Species of fish

Plectranthias wheeleri, the spotted perchlet, is a species of fish in the family Serranidae occurring in the western Pacific Ocean.

== Size ==
This species reaches a length of 8.3 cm (3.3 in).

== Etymology ==
The fish is named in honor of Alwyne C. Wheeler (1929-2005), the Curator of Fishes at the British Museum of Natural History.
