= Plectranthias bilaticlavia =

Conservation status
- Least Concern (IUCN 3.1)

Scientific classification
- Kingdom: Animalia
- Phylum: Chordata
- Class: Actinopterygii
- Order: Perciformes
- Family: Anthiadidae
- Genus: Plectranthias
- Species: P. bilaticlavia

Binomial name
- Plectranthias bilaticlavia Paulin & C. D. Roberts, 1987

Species of fish

Plectranthias bilaticlavia is a species of fish in the family Serranidae occurring in the south-western Pacific Ocean.
