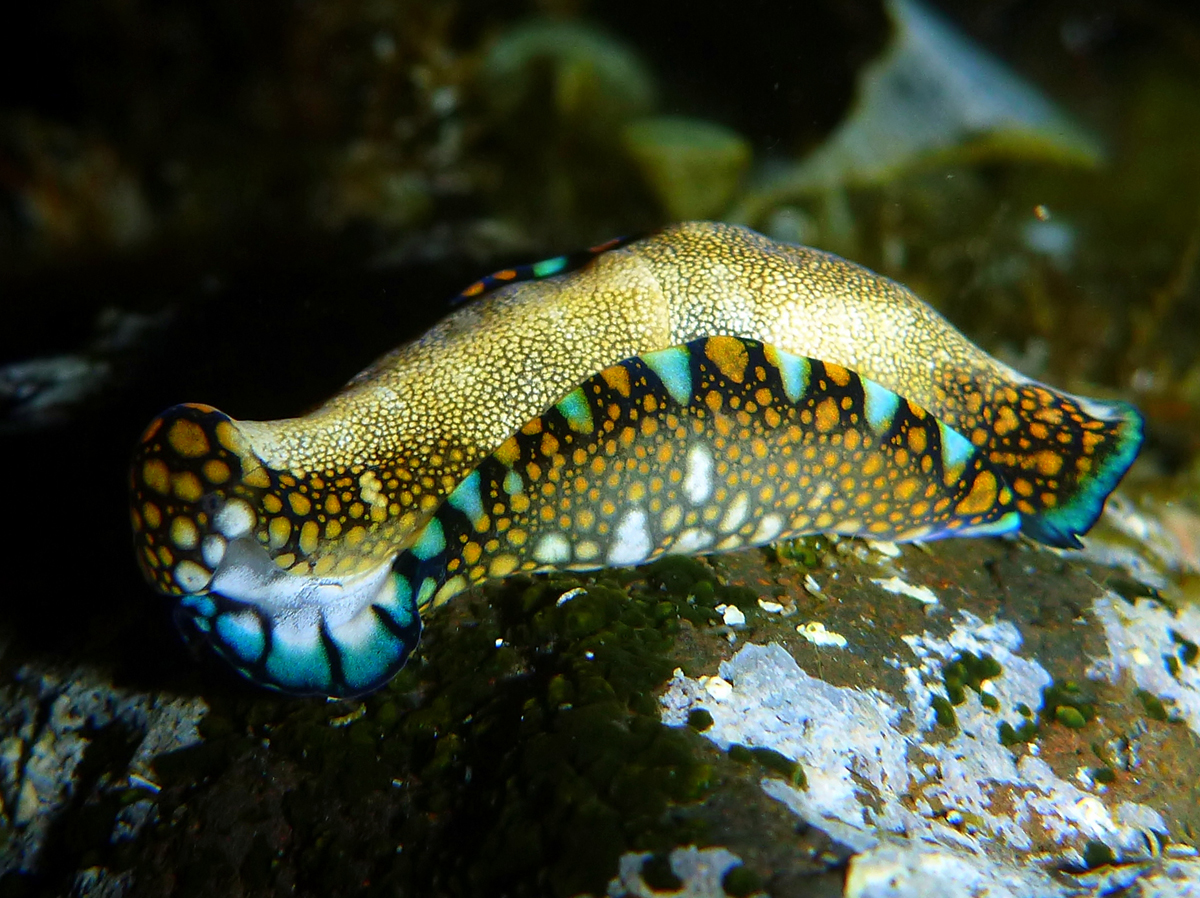
- Tubulophilinopsis reticulata in Réunion

Scientific classification
- Kingdom: Animalia
- Phylum: Mollusca
- Class: Gastropoda
- Subterclass: Tectipleura
- Order: Cephalaspidea
- Family: Aglajidae
- Genus: Tubulophilinopsis; Zamora-Silva & Malaquias, 2017

Species
- 4; see text

Synonyms
- Aglaja splendida Marcus, 1965; Doridium gardineri Eliot, 1903 (original combination); Philinopsis gardineri (Eliot, 1903)

= Tubulophilinopsis =

Genus of sea slugs

Tubulophilinopsis is a genus of medium-sized, sea slugs from the Indo-West Pacific belonging to the family Aglajidae.

== Species ==
As of 2021 there are four species:

Image	Scientific name	Distribution
	Tubulophilinopsis gardineri (Eliot, 1903)	Tropical Indo-West Pacific
	Tubulophilinopsis lineolata (H. Adams & A. Adams, 1854)	Indo-West Pacific
	Tubulophilinopsis pilsbryi (Eliot, 1900)	Tropical Indo-West Pacific
	Tubulophilinopsis reticulata (Eliot, 1903)	Indo-West Pacific
