= Plectranthias cruentus =

Scientific classification
- Kingdom: Animalia
- Phylum: Chordata
- Class: Actinopterygii
- Order: Perciformes
- Family: Anthiadidae
- Genus: Plectranthias
- Species: P. cruentus

Binomial name
- Plectranthias cruentus A. C. Gill & C. D. Roberts. 2020

Species of ray-finned fish

Plectranthias cruentus, the bloody perchlet, is a species of ray-finned fish in the subfamily Anthiinae, part of the family Serranidae, the groupers and sea basses.
