= Plectranthias knappi =

Conservation status
- Data Deficient (IUCN 3.1)

Scientific classification
- Kingdom: Animalia
- Phylum: Chordata
- Class: Actinopterygii
- Order: Perciformes
- Family: Anthiadidae
- Genus: Plectranthias
- Species: P. knappi

Binomial name
- Plectranthias knappi J. E. Randall, 1996

Species of fish

Plectranthias knappi is a species of fish in the family Serranidae occurring in the western-central Pacific Ocean.

== Size ==
This species reaches a length of 6.6 cm (2.6 in).

== Etymology ==
The fish is named in honor of Smithsonian ichthyologist Leslie W. Knapp (1929-2017), who was the one who collected the type specimen and recognized it as probably representing an undescribed species.
