= Plectranthias jothyi =

Scientific classification
- Domain: Eukaryota
- Kingdom: Animalia
- Phylum: Chordata
- Class: Actinopterygii
- Order: Perciformes
- Family: Anthiadidae
- Genus: Plectranthias
- Species: P. jothyi

Binomial name
- Plectranthias jothyi Randall, 1996

Species of fish

Plectranthias jothyi is a species of ray-finned fish within the family Serranidae. It is native to the Indo-Pacific Ocean off Malaysia, living in pelagic waters 180 to 400 meters below sea level. It grows to a length of 9.2 centimeters.

== Etymology ==
The fish is named in honor of Alexander A. Jothy, of the Fisheries Research Institute of Penang, Malaysia, who collected the type specimen.
