= Plectranthias taylori =

Conservation status
- Least Concern (IUCN 3.1)

Scientific classification
- Kingdom: Animalia
- Phylum: Chordata
- Class: Actinopterygii
- Order: Perciformes
- Family: Anthiadidae
- Genus: Plectranthias
- Species: P. taylori

Binomial name
- Plectranthias taylori J. E. Randall, 1980

Species of fish

Plectranthias taylori is a species of fish in the family Serranidae occurring in the eastern-central Pacific Ocean.

== Size ==
This species reaches a length of 23.8 cm (9.4 in).

== Etymology ==
The fish is named in honor of Leigthon R. Taylor, Jr. (b. 1940), the director of the Waikiki Aquarium, an ichthyologist at the University of Hawaii, and principal collector of the type specimen.
