= Plectranthias helenae =

Conservation status
- Least Concern (IUCN 3.1)

Scientific classification
- Kingdom: Animalia
- Phylum: Chordata
- Class: Actinopterygii
- Order: Perciformes
- Family: Anthiadidae
- Genus: Plectranthias
- Species: P. helenae

Binomial name
- Plectranthias helenae J. E. Randall, 1980

Species of fish

Plectranthias helenae is a species of fish in the family Serranidae occurring in the Pacific Ocean. There is little concern over this species and its extinction rate.

== Size ==
This species reaches a length of 6.2 cm (2.4 in).

== Etymology ==
American ichthyologist J.E. Randall named the fish in honor of his spouse, Helen, "in gratitude for her encouragement and assistance in this and other ichthyological studies".
