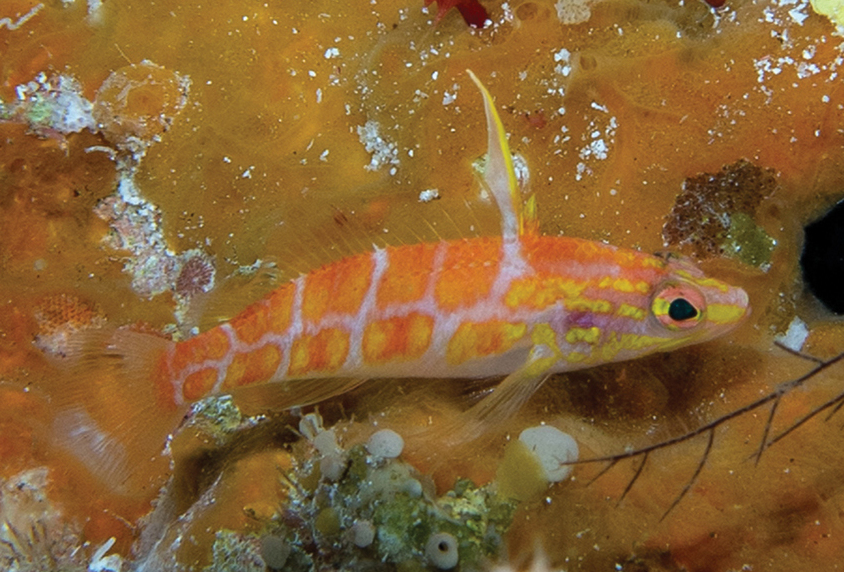

Scientific classification
- Domain: Eukaryota
- Kingdom: Animalia
- Phylum: Chordata
- Class: Actinopterygii
- Order: Perciformes
- Family: Anthiadidae
- Genus: Plectranthias
- Species: P. polygonius

Binomial name
- Plectranthias polygonius Shepherd, Phelps, Pinheiro, Rocha & Rocha 2020

= Plectranthias polygonius =

Species of fish

Plectranthias polygonius, the polygon perchlet, is a species of fish in the family Serranidae occurring in the Pacific Ocean.

== Size ==
This species reaches a length of 3.2 cm (1.3 in).
