= Plectranthias cirrhitoides =

Conservation status
- Least Concern (IUCN 3.1)

Scientific classification
- Kingdom: Animalia
- Phylum: Chordata
- Class: Actinopterygii
- Order: Perciformes
- Family: Anthiadidae
- Genus: Plectranthias
- Species: P. cirrhitoides

Binomial name
- Plectranthias cirrhitoides J. E. Randall, 1980

Species of fish

Plectranthias cirrhitoides is a species of fish in the family Serranidae occurring in the eastern-central Pacific Ocean.

== Size ==
This species reaches a length of 5.7 cm (2.2 in).
