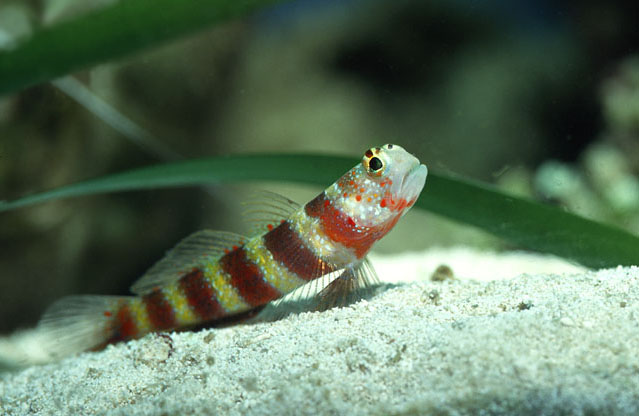

Conservation status
- Least Concern (IUCN 3.1)

Scientific classification
- Kingdom: Animalia
- Phylum: Chordata
- Class: Actinopterygii
- Order: Gobiiformes
- Family: Gobiidae
- Genus: Amblyeleotris
- Species: A. wheeleri

Binomial name
- Amblyeleotris wheeleri (Polunin & Lubbock, 1977)

Synonyms
- Cryptocentrus wheeleri Polunin & Lubbock, 1977

= Gorgeous prawn goby =

Species of fish

Amblyeleotris wheeleri, the Gorgeous prawn-goby, is a species of goby native to tropical reefs of the Indian Ocean to the western Pacific Ocean. It can be found at depths of from 5 to 40 metres (16 to 131 ft) though is usually does not occur deeper than 15 metres (49 ft). It is a commensal with alpheid shrimps, most often being found in association with Alpheus ochrostriatus. This species can reach a length of 10 centimetres (3.9 in) SL. It can also be found in the aquarium trade.

== Etymology ==
The specific name honours the English ichthyologist Alwynne Cooper Wheeler (1929-2005), who was curator of Fishes at the British Museum (Natural History), "for his help over the years, particularly with the authors’ study of prawn-associated gobies of the Seychelles".
