= Plectranthias purpuralepis =

Scientific classification
- Domain: Eukaryota
- Kingdom: Animalia
- Phylum: Chordata
- Class: Actinopterygii
- Order: Perciformes
- Family: Anthiadidae
- Genus: Plectranthias
- Species: P. purpuralepis

Binomial name
- Plectranthias purpuralepis Tang, Lai & Ho, 2020

Species of fish

Plectranthias purpuralepis, the purple-scaled perchlet, is a species of fish in the family Serranidae occurring in the north-western Pacific Ocean.

== Size ==
This species reaches a length of 15.1 cm (5.9 in).
