= Upeneus doriae =

Conservation status
- Data Deficient (IUCN 3.1)

Scientific classification
- Kingdom: Animalia
- Phylum: Chordata
- Class: Actinopterygii
- Division: Teleostei
- Order: Syngnathiformes
- Family: Mullidae
- Genus: Upeneus
- Species: U. doriae

Binomial name
- Upeneus doriae (Günther, 1869)

Synonyms
- Upeneoides doriae Günther, 1869

Species of ray-finned fish

Upeneus doriae, the gilded goatfish, is a species of ray-finned fish within the family Mullidae. The species is found distributed in the western Indian Ocean in the Persian Gulf and the Gulf of Oman. It is a demersal species, schooling over sandy substrates, reef areas, and near coastal areas at depths up to 45 metres (150 ft). It grows to lengths of 20 to 30 centimetres (7.9 to 11.8 in).

== Conservation ==
Upeneus doriae has been classified as a 'Data deficient' species by the IUCN Red List. It is often captured in fisheries, however there is no population data on the species, leading to uncertainty of the effects this may have on the species current population at a global level.
