= Vernon Lyman Kellogg =

American entomologist (1867–1937)

Vernon Kellogg
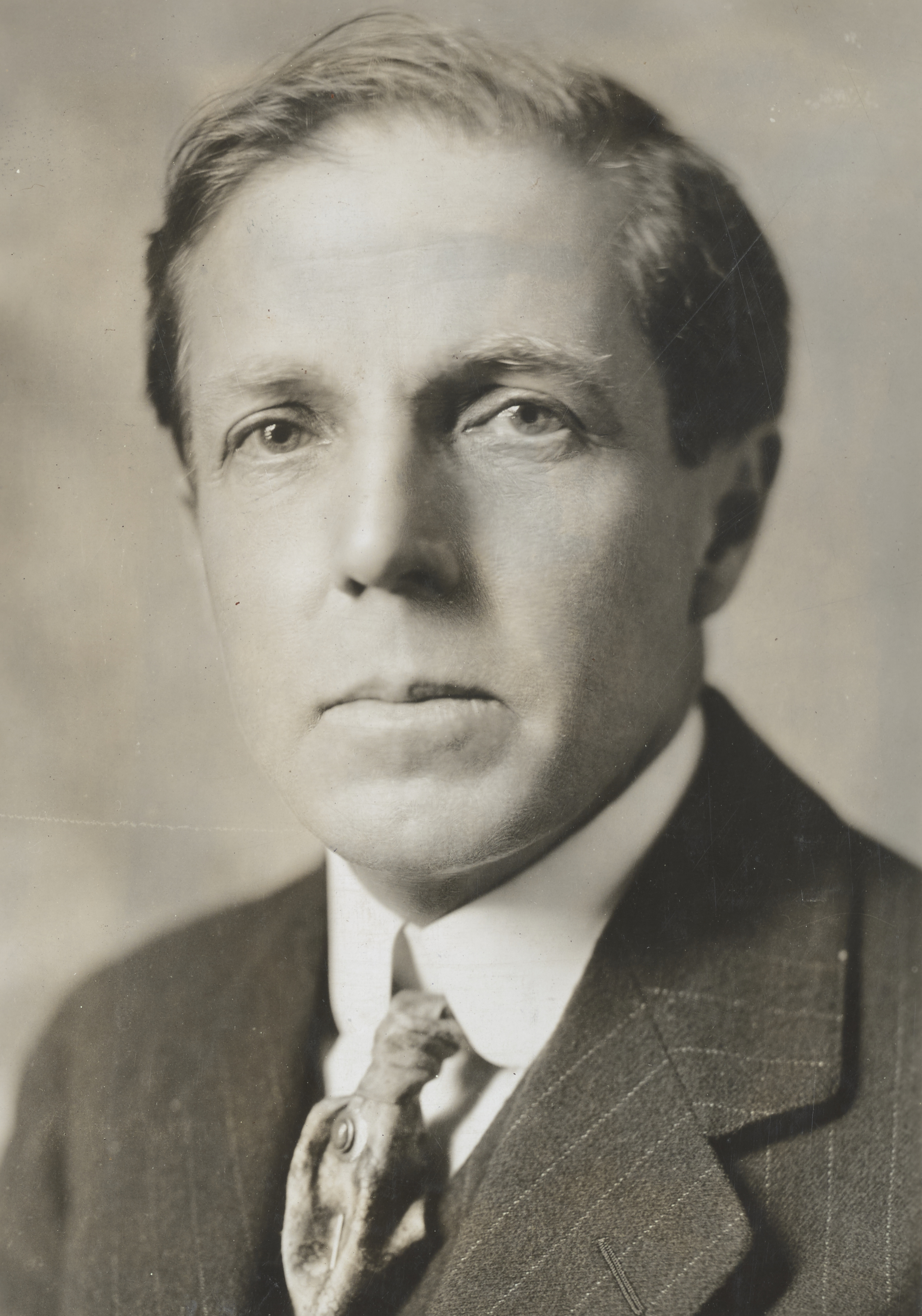
- Born: December 1, 1867; Emporia, Kansas
- Died: August 8, 1937 (aged 69); Hartford, Connecticut
- Spouse: Charlotte Hoffman

Vernon Lyman Kellogg (December 1, 1867 – August 8, 1937) was an American entomologist, evolutionary biologist, and science administrator. A major contribution was his study of bird lice and their hosts. He established the Department of Zoology at Stanford University in 1894, and served as the first permanent secretary of the National Research Council in Washington, D.C.

Kellogg was an elected member of both the American Philosophical Society and the United States National Academy of Sciences.

== Early life ==
Kellogg was born on December 1, 1867, in Emporia, Kansas. His father was Lyman Beecher Kellogg, first president of the Kansas State Normal School (now known as Emporia State University), and former Kansas Attorney General.

He studied under Francis Snow at the University of Kansas, under John Henry Comstock at Stanford University, and under Rudolf Leuckart at the University of Leipzig in Germany.

== Career ==
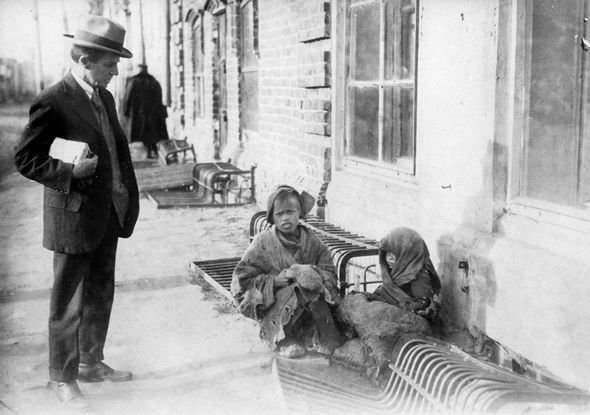
Vernon Kellogg encounters two refugees on a Moscow street while he is on a humanitarian mission.

From 1894 to 1920, Kellogg was professor of entomology at Stanford University, where he established the Department of Zoology. Kellogg specialized in insect taxonomy and economic entomology. Herbert Hoover was among his students, and Ruby Green Bell and Florence E. Bemis worked in his lab. A major contribution was the study of bird ectoparasites and the suggestion that he made that their speciation may be linked with that of their hosts. In 1896 he suggested that the lice might be jumping (or "straggling") from one host to another. He was particularly noting jumps between apparently unrelated hosts. In 1902 Kellogg and Kuwana examined the mallophaga of the birds of the Galapagos islands and began to compare them with those from the mainland. By 1913 he had constructed an idea of cospeciation or coevolution influenced also by the work of Heinrich Fahrenholz.

=== Vernon Kellogg House ===
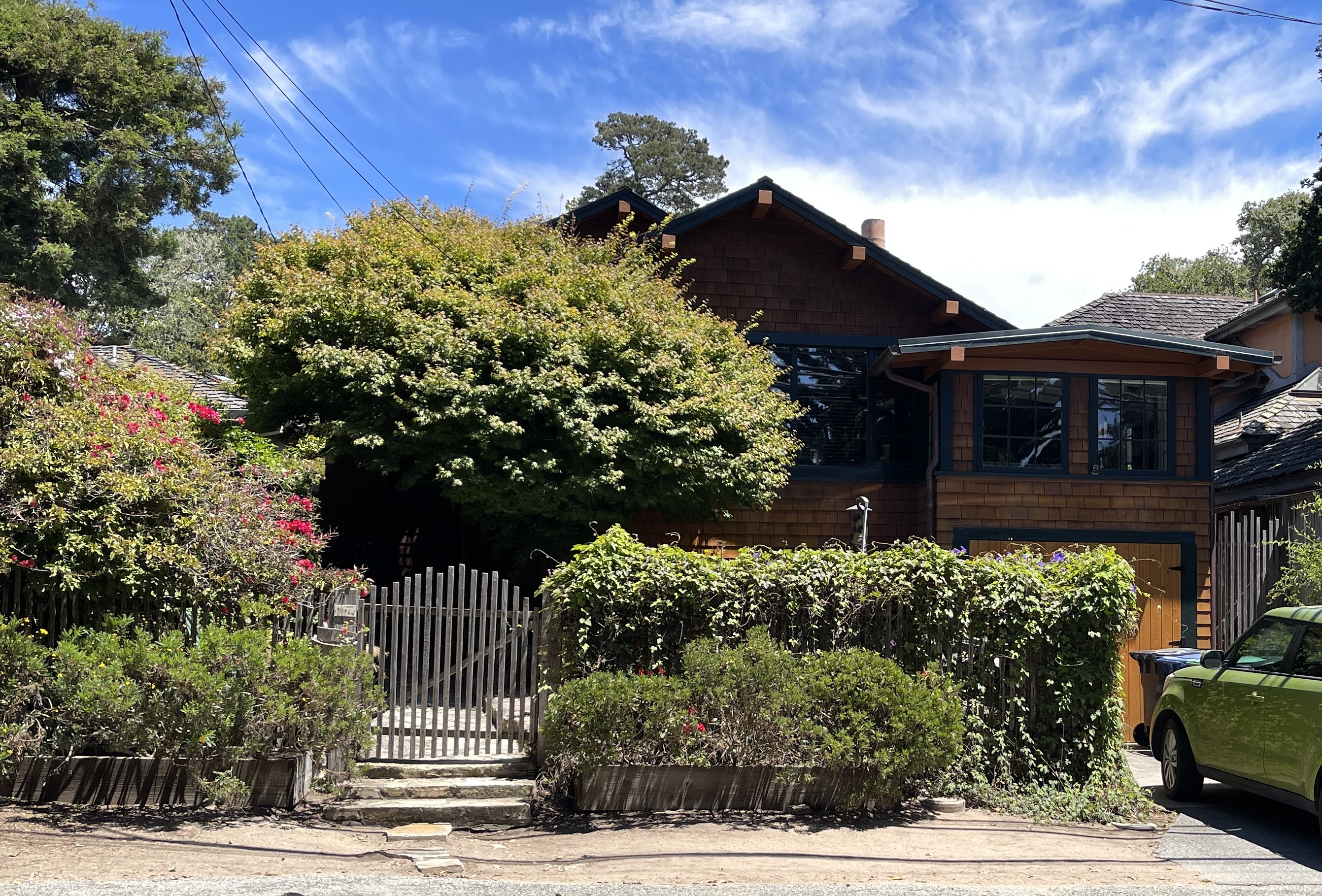
Vernon Kellogg Craftsman-style House in Carmel-by-the-Sea.

He was one of the professors to build a summer home on what became known as "Professors' Row" in Carmel-by-the-Sea, California. The home is a wood-framed redwood Craftsman-style cottage built in 1906. He was good friends with Stanford University president David Starr Jordan who also lived there.

In 1908, Kellogg married Charlotte Hoffman and the two welcomed their only child, Jean Kellogg Dickie, in 1910.

Kellogg was a conservationist, an officer of the Sierra Club, and enjoyed outdoor recreation. In addition to his publications on lice, Kellogg wrote two books. Darwinism ToDay (1907) was a summary of all the major evolutionary theories and a general defense of Darwinism. The second book is titled Headquarters Nights (1918).

In July 1913, Kellogg directed the play Fire, by author Mary Austin, at the Forest Theater in Carmel-by-the-Sea.

His academic career was interrupted by two years (1915 and 1916) spent in Brussels as director of Hoover's humanitarian American Commission for Relief in Belgium. Initially a pacifist, Kellogg dined with the officers of the German Supreme Command. He became shocked by the grotesque Social Darwinist motivation for the German war machine, "the creed of survival of the fittest based on violent and fatal competitive struggle is the Gospel of the German intellectuals." Kellogg decided that the ideas could be beaten only by force and, using his connections with America's political elite, began to campaign for American intervention in the war. He published an account of his conversations in the book Headquarters Nights.

After the war, he served as the first permanent secretary of the National Research Council (NRC) in Washington, D.C. He served on the board of trustees for Science Service, (now known as Society for Science & the Public), from 1921 to 1933. At his retirement he became Secretary Emeritus.

A Liberty ship built in the United States during World War II was named SS Vernon L. Kellogg.

== Works ==
- Common Injurious Insects of Kansas (Lawrence University, 1892).
- With J. H. Comstock, The elements of insect anatomy; an outline for the use of students in the entomological laboratories of Cornell University and Leland Stanford Junior University (Comstock Pub. Co., Ithaca, 1895).
- With J. H. Comstock, The Elements of Insect Anatomy (Comstock Pub. Co., Ithaca, 1899).
- A list of the biting lice (Mallophaga) taken from birds and mammals of North America (Gov’t print. off., Washington, 1899).
- With Oliver Peebles Jenkins (1850-1935), Lessons in Nature Study (The Whitaker & Ray Company, San Francisco, 1900).
- With David Starr Jordan, Animal Life: A First Book of Zoölogy (D. Appelton and Co., New York, 1900).
- Elementary Zoology (Henry Holt and Company, New York, 1901, reedited in 1902).
- First Lessons in Zoology (Henry Holt and Company, New York, 1903).
- With David Starr Jordan, Evolution and Animal Life: An Elementary Discussion of Facts, Processes, Laws and Theories Relating to the Life and Evolution of Animals (D. Appleton and Company, New York, 1907).
- Darwinism To-Day: A Discussion of Present-Day Scientific Criticism of the Darwinian Selection Theories, together with a Brief Account of the Principal Other Proposed Auxiliary and Alternative Theories of Species-Forming (Henry Holt and Company, New York, 1907).
- Insect Stories (D. Appleton and Company, New York & London, 1908, reedited in 1923).
- With D. S. Jordan, The Scientific Aspects of Luther Burbank's Work (A. M. Robertson, San Francisco, 1909).
- American Insects (Henry Holt and Company, New York, 1905, reedited in 1908).
- The Animals and Man: An Elementary Textbook of Zoology and Human Physiology (New York, Henry Holt and Company, 1905, reedited with contributions from Mary Isabel McCracken in 1911).
- Eugenics and Militarism, presented at First International Eugenics Congress, 1912, published in Atlantic Monthly, July 1913.
- "Bionomics of War: Military Selection and Race Determination", Social Hygiene, 1/1 (December 1914)
- With Gordon Floyd Ferris (1893-1958), The Anoplura and Mallophaga of North American Mammals (Stanford University, 1915).
- With Rennie Wilbur Doane (1871-1942), Elementary textbook of economic zoology and entomology (Henry Holt and Company, New York, 1915). Free online version.
- With Alonzo E. Taylor (1871-1949), The food problem (Macmillan Company, New York, 1917).
- Headquarters Nights: A Record of Conversations and Experiences at the Headquarters of the German Army in France and Belgium, Boston, The Atlantic Monthly Press, 1917, 116 pp. Biographical note, pp. 7–11. Foreword [by] Theodore Roosevelt, Sagamore Hill, August 26, 1917, p. 13.
- The Food Problem, with Alonzo Engelbert Taylor (1871-1949), (The Macmillan Company, New York, 1917).
- Fighting Starvation in Belgium (Page & Company, New York, Doubleday, 1918).
- Germany in the War and After, New York, The Macmillan Company, 1919.
- Herbert Hoover: The Man and His Work (D. Appleton and company, New York et Londres 1920).
- With des chansons de Charlotte Kellogg, Nuova: or, The New Bee, A Story for Children of Five to Fifty (Houghton Mifflin, Boston et New York, v. 1920).
- Human Life as the Biologist Sees It (Henry Holt and Company, New York, 1922).
- Mind and Heredity (Princeton University Press, 1923).
- Evolution: The Way of Man. (D. Appleton, New York, 1926).

== Taxon named in his honor ==
- Plectranthias kelloggi (D. S. Jordan & Evermann, 1903) is a species of fish in the family Serranidae occurring in the Western Pacific Ocean.
