= Parapercis albiventer =

Scientific classification
- Kingdom: Animalia
- Phylum: Chordata
- Class: Actinopterygii
- Order: Labriformes
- Family: Pinguipedidae
- Genus: Parapercis
- Species: P. albiventer

Binomial name
- Parapercis albiventer H. C. Ho, Heemstra & Imamura, 2014

Species of ray-finned fish

Parapercis albiventer, the whitebelly sandperch, is a species of ray-finned fish in the sandperch family, Pinguipedidae. It is found in the western Indian Ocean from Zanzibar and Madagascar to southern Mozambique and South Africa.

== Description ==
Parapercis albiventer can reach a standard length of 16.8 centimetres (6.6 in).
