= Plectranthias pelicieri =

Conservation status
- Least Concern (IUCN 3.1)

Scientific classification
- Kingdom: Animalia
- Phylum: Chordata
- Class: Actinopterygii
- Order: Perciformes
- Family: Anthiadidae
- Genus: Plectranthias
- Species: P. pelicieri

Binomial name
- Plectranthias pelicieri J. E. Randall & Shimizu, 1994

Species of fish

Plectranthias pelicieri is a species of fish in the family Serranidae occurring in the Indian Ocean.

== Size ==
This species reaches a length of 4.0 cm (1.6 in).

== Etymology ==
The fish is named in honor of Daniel Pelicier (1946-2018), an aquarium fish collector and exporter in Flic en Flac, which is a village in Mauritius, who was the one who collected all of the type specimens and provided one of the photographs the authors used in the description.
