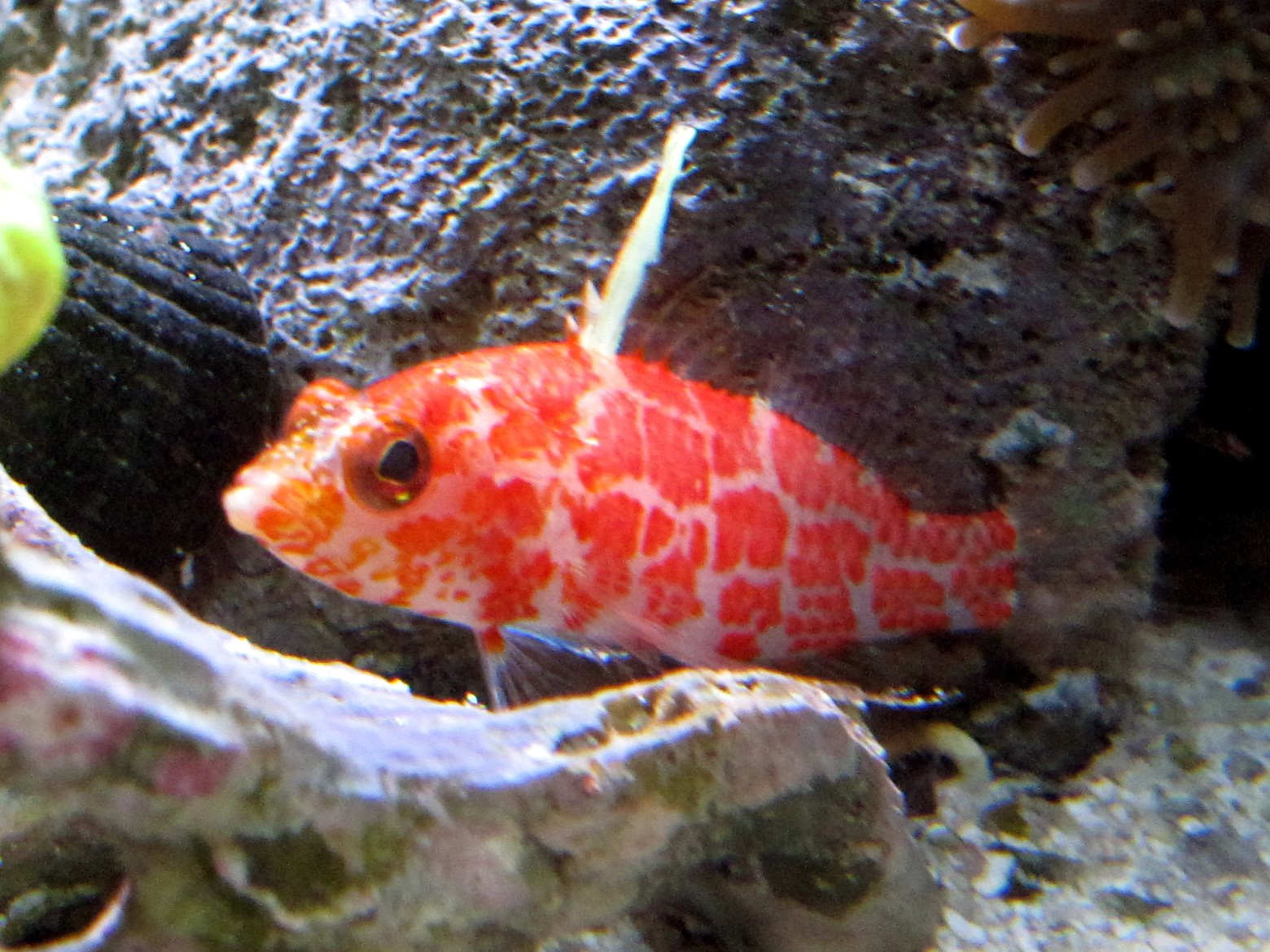

Conservation status
- Least Concern (IUCN 3.1)

Scientific classification
- Kingdom: Animalia
- Phylum: Chordata
- Class: Actinopterygii
- Order: Perciformes
- Family: Anthiadidae
- Genus: Plectranthias
- Species: P. alleni

Binomial name
- Plectranthias alleni J. E. Randall, 1980

= Plectranthias alleni =

Species of fish

Plectranthias alleni, also known as Allen's perchlet, is a species of fish in the family Serranidae occurring in the eastern Indian Ocean.

== Size ==
This species reaches a length of 6.3 cm (2.5 in).

== Etymology ==
The fish is named in honor of ichthyologist Gerald R. Allen (b. 1942), of the Western Australia Museum in Perth, who provided the type specimens to the author knowing that the species was an undescribed one.
