= Plectranthias fourmanoiri =

Conservation status
- Least Concern (IUCN 3.1)

Scientific classification
- Kingdom: Animalia
- Phylum: Chordata
- Class: Actinopterygii
- Order: Perciformes
- Family: Anthiadidae
- Genus: Plectranthias
- Species: P. fourmanoiri

Binomial name
- Plectranthias fourmanoiri J. E. Randall, 1980

Species of fish

Plectranthias fourmanoiri, the doublespot perchlet, is a species of fish in the family Serranidae occurring in the Indo-Pacific Ocean.

== Size ==
This species reaches a length of 4.7 cm (1.9 in).

== Etymology ==
The fish is named in honor of Pierre Fourmanoir (1924–2007), the FAO Regional Fisheries Officer, in Madagascar, who obtained a specimen of this fish and realized that it was a new species.
