= Plectranthias nazcae =

Scientific classification
- Domain: Eukaryota
- Kingdom: Animalia
- Phylum: Chordata
- Class: Actinopterygii
- Order: Perciformes
- Family: Anthiadidae
- Genus: Plectranthias
- Species: P. nazcae

Binomial name
- Plectranthias nazcae W. D. Anderson, 2008

Species of fish

Plectranthias nazcae, the red splodge, is a species of fish in the family Serranidae occurring in the southern Pacific Ocean.

== Size ==
This species reaches a length of 15.0 cm (5.9 in).

== Etymology ==
The fish is named in honor of the Nazca Ridge.
