= Upeneus indicus =

Scientific classification
- Kingdom: Animalia
- Phylum: Chordata
- Class: Actinopterygii
- Order: Syngnathiformes
- Family: Mullidae
- Genus: Upeneus
- Species: U. indicus

Binomial name
- Upeneus indicus Uiblein & Heemstra, 2010

Species of goatfish

Upeneus indicus is a species of goatfish. It is only known from southwestern India near Kochi, and its depth distribution is unknown.
