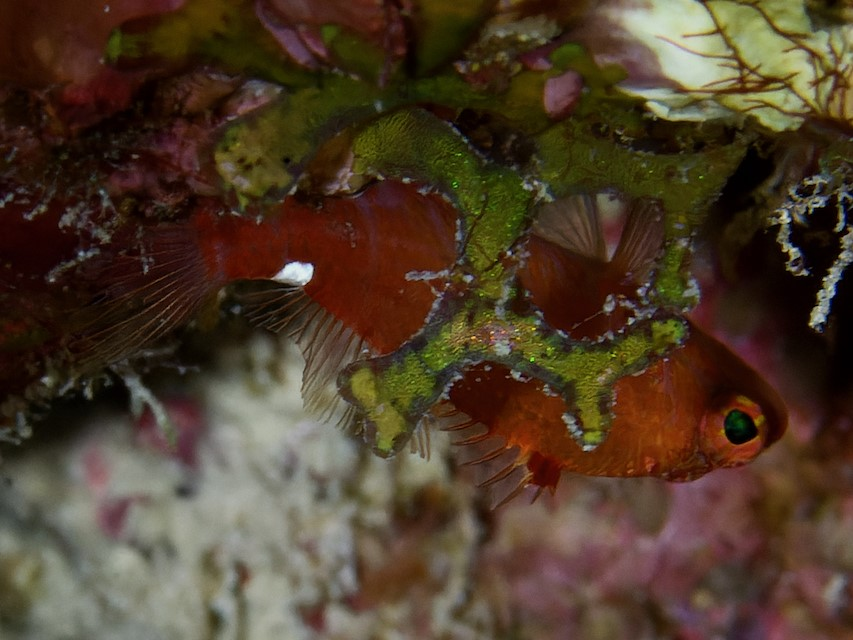

Conservation status
- Least Concern (IUCN 3.1)

Scientific classification
- Kingdom: Animalia
- Phylum: Chordata
- Class: Actinopterygii
- Order: Perciformes
- Family: Anthiadidae
- Genus: Plectranthias
- Species: P. winniensis

Binomial name
- Plectranthias winniensis (J. C. Tyler, 1966)

Synonyms
- Pteranthias winniensis Tyler, 1966

= Plectranthias winniensis =

Species of fish

Plectranthias winniensis, also known as the redblotch basslet, is a species of fish in the family Serranidae occurring in the Indo-Pacific. From the Red Sea and East Africa to the Hawaiian, Tuamoto and Pitcairn Islands, and then south to the Great Barrier Reef and the Austral Islands.

The fish reaches a length of 4.0 cm (1.6 in).

== Etymology ==
The fish is named after a place called, Winnie's, which the original author described it as a "most pleasant place on the island of Mahé in the Seychelles".
