= John Stanley Gardiner =

British zoologist

John Stanley Gardiner (1872–1946) was a British zoologist.

== Biography ==
Stanley, as he was known, was the younger son of John Jephson Gardiner and Sarah McTier. He was born in Jordanstown (Belfast) in 1872 – two years after his brother Arthur. Jephson was a member of the Anglican clergy and, at the time of his marriage to Sarah in 1868, was chaplain to Lord Dufferin at Carrickfergus (near Belfast). Stanley's mother died five months after he was born and in 1874, he and Arthur were taken by their father to England. They initially lived in Marshfield, Wiltshire, with Jephson having the position of Curate there. In 1876, Jephson and his two sons moved to Wonersh, near Guildford, Surrey. There Arthur and Stanley were pupils at a boarding school at 108 High Street, Guildford.

Stanley attended Marlborough College from January 1885 until July 1890. While there "his critical thinking was shaped by the science masters and where he was a great supporter of the school's Natural History Society". Stanley won an exhibition to Gonville and Caius College, Cambridge and became a member of the college in 1891. He studied zoology and graduated in 1894 with a first class degree in Natural Sciences. He played hockey for Cambridge in 1894.

The period from 1896 to 1909 was spent by Stanley in doing field work in coral research. He spend considerable time in remote locations in the Indian Ocean as a member of three expeditions. He was particularly fascinated by marine biology and in 1896, aged 26, he joined the Royal Society Expedition to Funafuti in the Ellice Islands in the Pacific. This must have been a very formative experience for thereafter he devoted much of his research to the scleractinian corals and the environmental factors influencing their distribution. This research encompassed not only the identification and taxonomy of corals but also studies of their growth rates and feeding biology. Much of his subsequent work was carried out in the Indian Ocean, first of all in the Laccadives and Maldives and then through expeditions to the Chagos Archipelago, Seychelles, Amirantes, Coetivy, Cargados Carajos, Farquhar, Providence, St. Pierre and Mauritius. He was certainly an early pioneer in coral reef research not only in terms of his careful observational work on Indian Ocean reefs, many of whom have not been revisited by modern scientists, but also in the wide range of research he undertook into the biology of corals.

A significant element of his legacy to coral reef research lies in his contribution to the Great Barrier Reef Expedition of 1928–29. This was a major expedition, led by a British scientist, C.M. Yonge, appointed and funded as a result of Gardiner's initiatives. The expedition proved to be a turning point in coral reef science with far reaching results that are still cited by reef workers in their publications today. Many of the key questions asked by the expedition were based on Gardiner's initial research in the Indian Ocean.

Gardiner became Professor of Zoology in Cambridge in 1909 and retained this position until 1937. During this period recognition of Gardiner's contribution to marine science, and coral reef research in particular, was evident through his presentation of the Murchison Award of the Royal Geographical Society in 1902; his admission to the Fellowship of the Royal Society in 1908; his award of the Agassiz Medal of the American National Academy of Science in 1929, the Linnean Medal of the Linnean Society of London in 1936 and the Darwin Medal of the Royal Society in 1944. A listing of some of his major publications can be found in his obituary by Forster Cooper as well as in the article detailing his legacy to reef science referenced below.

== Family ==
Stanley married Rachel Florence Denning on 12 September 1900. They were married at All Souls' Church in Marylebone, London. Sadly, Rachel died in March 1901 from a miscarriage ("abortus" on her death certificate).

Stanley remarried in 1909. His wife was Edith Gertrude Willcock. She attended Newnham College, Cambridge from 1900 to 1904 and received a doctoral degree from Trinity College Dublin. (Apparently at the time, women could not receive doctoral degrees in England).

Edith was a chemist and did some pioneering research work with radium, and into the importance of amino acids in diet.

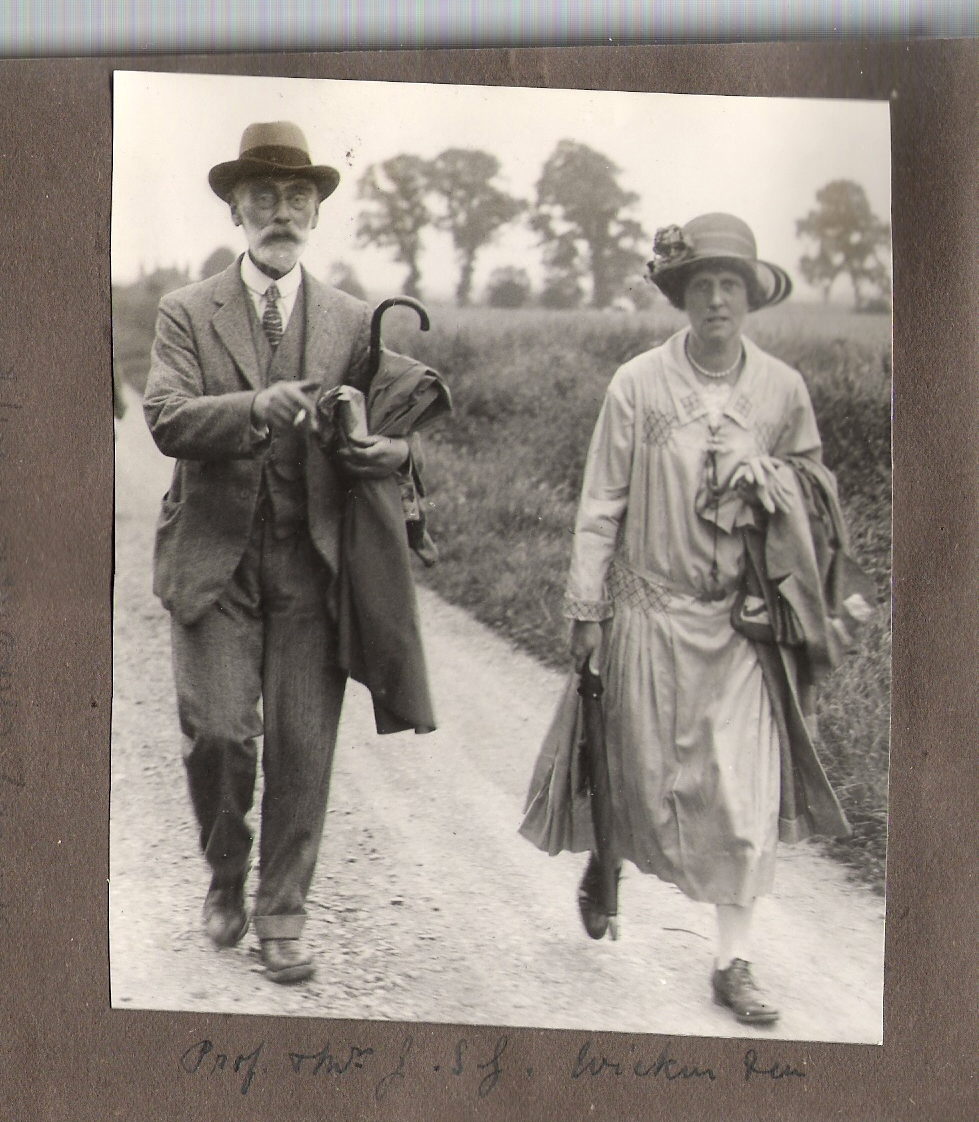
Stanley and Edith walking in Wicken Fen, Cambridge. Approximate date: 1930s

Edith and Stanley had two daughters – Nancy Emma Gardiner born in 1911 and Joyce Critchley Gardiner born in 1913. Their daughter Nancy died young at the age of 45. She was married but had no children. Joyce, an accomplished painter, married and had three children.

Stanley and Edith lived at Bredon House, Cambridge. In 1965, this became the administrative offices for the newly founded Wolfson College. Stanley died in 1946 and Edith followed him in 1953.

== Taxon named in his honor ==
Stanley Gardiner is commemorated in the scientific names of two species of lizards,

- The Rotuman forest gecko, Lepidodactylus gardineri Boulenger, 1897

and

- Gardiner's burrowing skink, Pamelaescincus gardineri, (Boulenger, 1909)
- Gardiner's Seychelles frog, Sechellophryne gardineri (Boulenger, 1911),
- Plectranthias gardineri (Regan, 1908) is a species of fish in the family Serranidae occurring in the Western Indian Ocean.

and in

- The sea slug Tubulophilinopsis gardineri (Eliot, 1903).

== Publications ==
- Gardiner, J. S., (1898), 'On the perforate corals collected by the author in the South Pacific', Proc. Zool. Soc. Lond., 257–276.
- Gardiner, J. S., (1898), 'The coral reefs of Funafuti, Rotuma and Fiji together with some notes on the structure and formation of coral reefs in general', Proc. Camb. Phil. Soc. 9, 417–503.
- Gardiner, J. S., (1903–1906) The fauna and geography of the Maldive and Laccadive Archipelagoes, being the account of the work carried on and of collections made by an expedition during the years 1899 and 1900 (2 volumes), Cambridge University Press, Cambridge, UK.
- Gardiner, J. S., (1901), 'On the rate of growth of some corals from Fiji', Proc. Camb. Phil. Soc. 11, 214–219.
- Gardiner, J. S., (1906), 'The Indian Ocean', Geog. J. 28, 313–332.
- Gardiner, J. S., (1907–36), 'Reports of the Percy Sladen Trust Expedition to the Indian Ocean in 1905', Trans. Linn. Soc. Lond. (2) 12–19.
- Gardiner, J. S., (1931) Coral reefs and atolls, Macmillan, London, UK.
- Gardiner, J. S., (1931), 'Photosynthesis and solution in formation of coral reefs', Nature 127, 857–858.
- Gardiner, J. S., (1936) 'The reefs of the western Indian Ocean. I. Chagos Archipelago. II. The Mascarene Region', Trans. Linn. Soc. Lond. (2) 19, 393–436.
