= Plectranthias pallidus =

Conservation status
- Data Deficient (IUCN 3.1)

Scientific classification
- Kingdom: Animalia
- Phylum: Chordata
- Class: Actinopterygii
- Order: Perciformes
- Family: Anthiadidae
- Genus: Plectranthias
- Species: P. pallidus

Binomial name
- Plectranthias pallidus J. E. Randall & Hoese, 1995

Species of fish

Plectranthias pallidus, pale perchlet, is a species of fish in the family Serranidae occurring in the western Pacific Ocean.

== Size ==
This species reaches a length of 7.6 cm (3.0 in).
