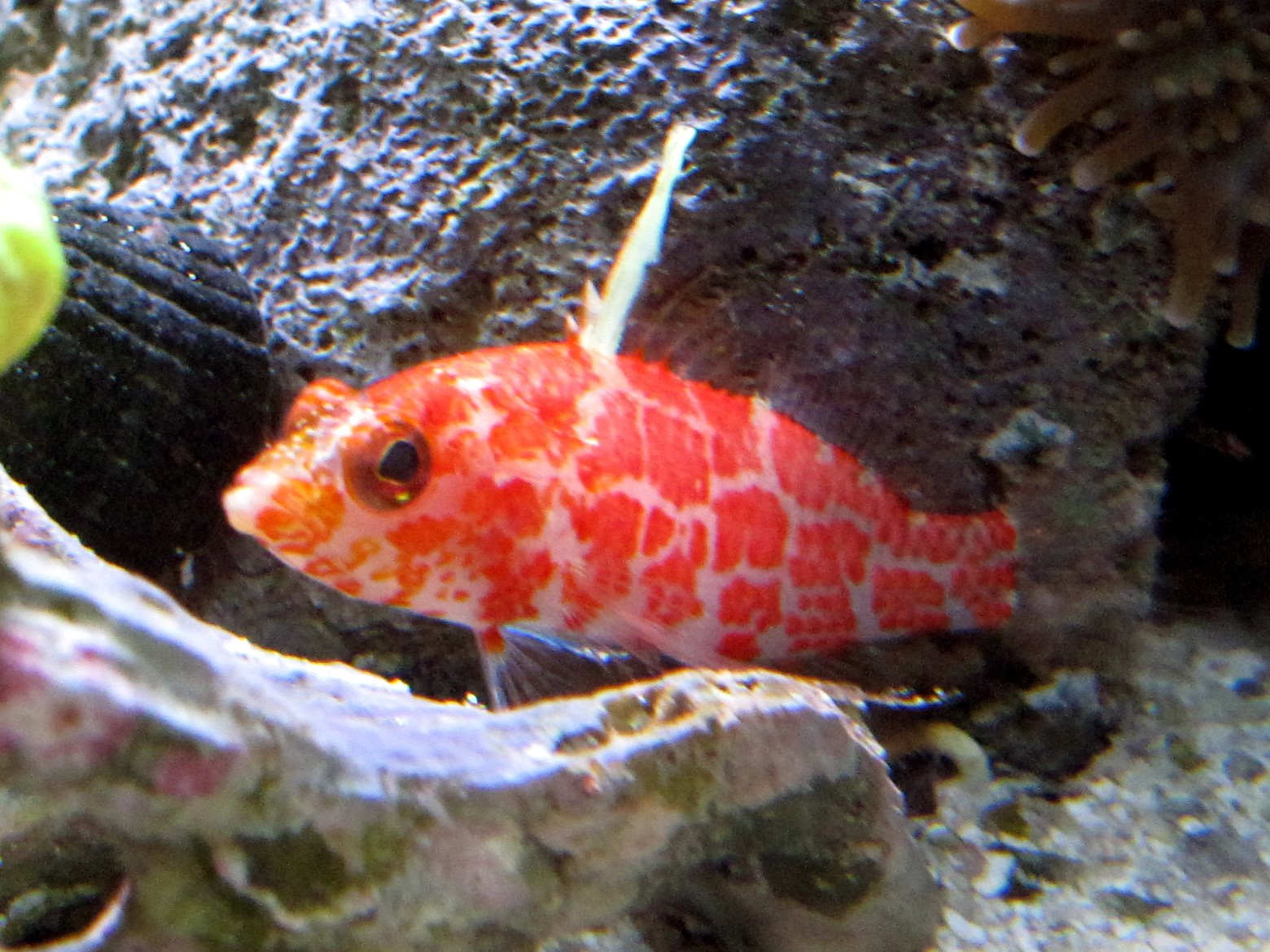

Conservation status
- Least Concern (IUCN 3.1)

Scientific classification
- Kingdom: Animalia
- Phylum: Chordata
- Class: Actinopterygii
- Order: Perciformes
- Family: Anthiadidae
- Genus: Plectranthias
- Species: P. inermis

Binomial name
- Plectranthias inermis J. E. Randall, 1980

= Plectranthias inermis =

Species of fish

Plectranthias inermis, the chequered perchlet, is a species of fish in the family Serranidae occurring in the Indo-West Pacific.

== Size ==
This species reaches a length of 4.5 cm (1.8 in).

== Distribution and Habitat ==
Plectranthias inermis, commonly known as the Chequered Perchlet or Geometric Flame Hawkfish, is distributed across the Indo-West Pacific, including Fiji, the Philippines, Mauritius, Indonesia, and Papua New Guinea. It inhabits deep coastal and inner reef drop-offs at depths of 14–65 m, where it resides among rubble or in crevices.
