= Plectranthias gardineri =

Conservation status
- Least Concern (IUCN 3.1)

Scientific classification
- Kingdom: Animalia
- Phylum: Chordata
- Class: Actinopterygii
- Order: Perciformes
- Family: Anthiadidae
- Genus: Plectranthias
- Species: P. gardineri

Binomial name
- Plectranthias gardineri (Regan, 1908)

Synonyms
- Xenanthias gardineri Regan, 1908

Species of fish

Plectranthias gardineri is a species of fish in the family Serranidae occurring in the western Indian Ocean.

== Size ==
This species reaches a length of 3.2 cm (1.3 in).

== Etymology ==
The fish is named in honor of British zoologist John Stanley Gardiner (1872–1946), who led an expedition to the Indian Ocean in 1905, during which the type specimen was collected.
