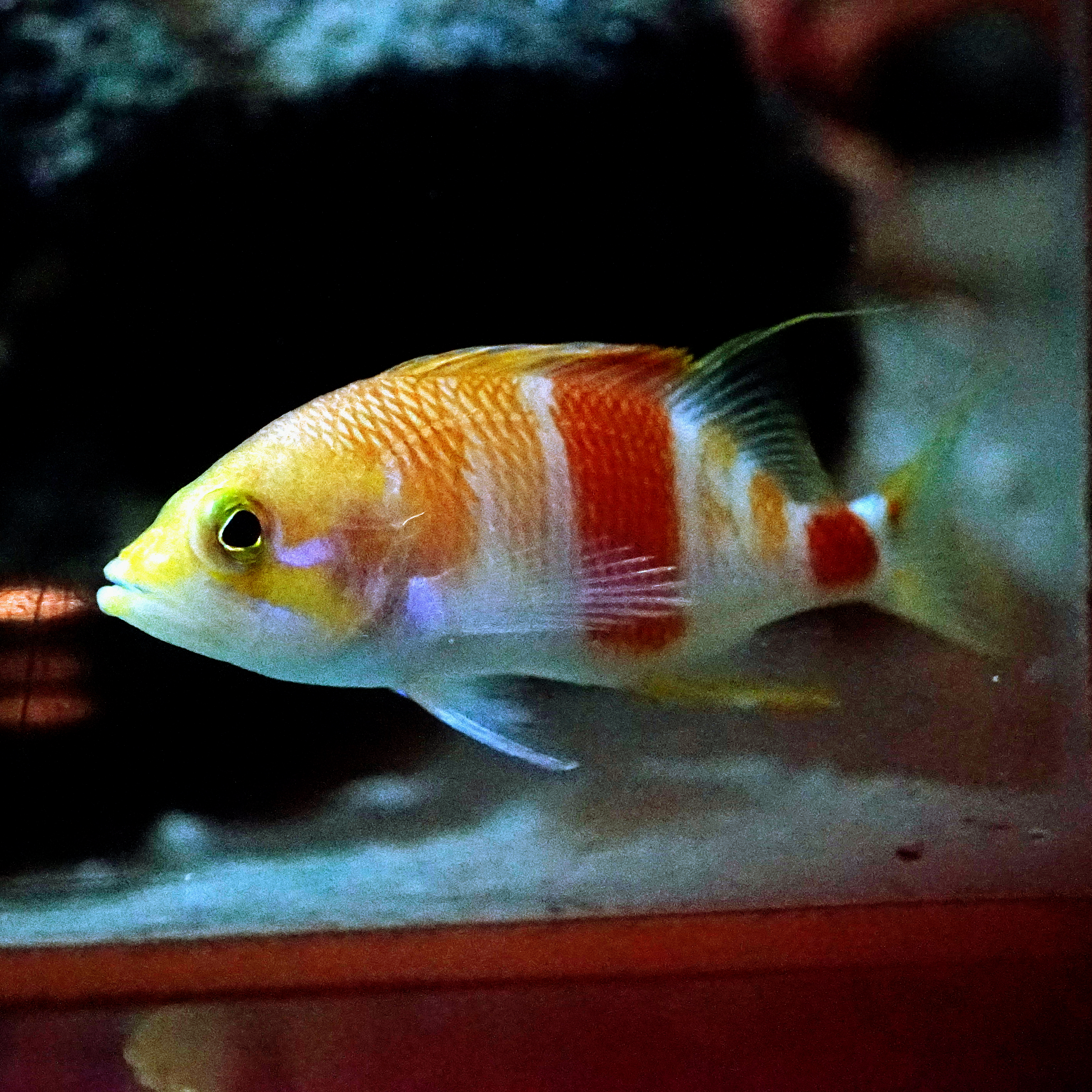

Conservation status
- Least Concern (IUCN 3.1)

Scientific classification
- Kingdom: Animalia
- Phylum: Chordata
- Class: Actinopterygii
- Order: Perciformes
- Family: Anthiadidae
- Genus: Plectranthias
- Species: P. kelloggi

Binomial name
- Plectranthias kelloggi (D. S. Jordan & Evermann, 1903)

Synonyms
- List: Anthias kelloggi Jordan & Evermann, 1903; Pseudanthias kelloggi (Jordan & Evermann, 1903); Zalanthias kelloggi (Jordan & Evermann, 1903); Anthias japonicus Döderlein, 1883; Pseudanthias azumanus Jordan & Richardson, 1910; Plectranthias kelloggi azumanus (Jordan & Richardson, 1910); Plectranthias kelloggi melanesius Randall, 1980; Anthias rubromaculatus Borets, 1982; Plectranthias rubromaculatus (Borets, 1982)

= Plectranthias kelloggi =

Species of fish

Plectranthias kelloggi, also known as eastern flower porgy, is a species of fish in the family Serranidae occurring in the western Pacific Ocean.

== Size ==
This species reaches a length of 12.0 cm (4.7 in).

== Etymology ==
The fish is named in honor of entomologist Vernon Lyman Kellogg (1867-1937), one of Jordan's colleagues at Stanford University.
