= Cameroon goby =

Conservation status
- Least Concern (IUCN 3.1)

Scientific classification
- Domain: Eukaryota
- Kingdom: Animalia
- Phylum: Chordata
- Class: Actinopterygii
- Order: Gobiiformes
- Family: Gobiidae
- Genus: Wheelerigobius
- Species: W. wirtzi

Binomial name
- Wheelerigobius wirtzi P. J. Miller, 1988

Species of fish

Wheelerigobius wirtzi, the Cameroon goby, is a species of goby native to the Atlantic coast of Africa where it is so far known from Victoria Bay, Cameroon and São Tomé Island. This fish has been found at a depth of about 1 metre (3.3 ft) on a vertical rock face. The species can reach a length of 3.5 centimetres (1.4 in) SL. The specific name honours the ichthyologist and blenny taxonomist Peter Wirtz who collected the type specimen.
