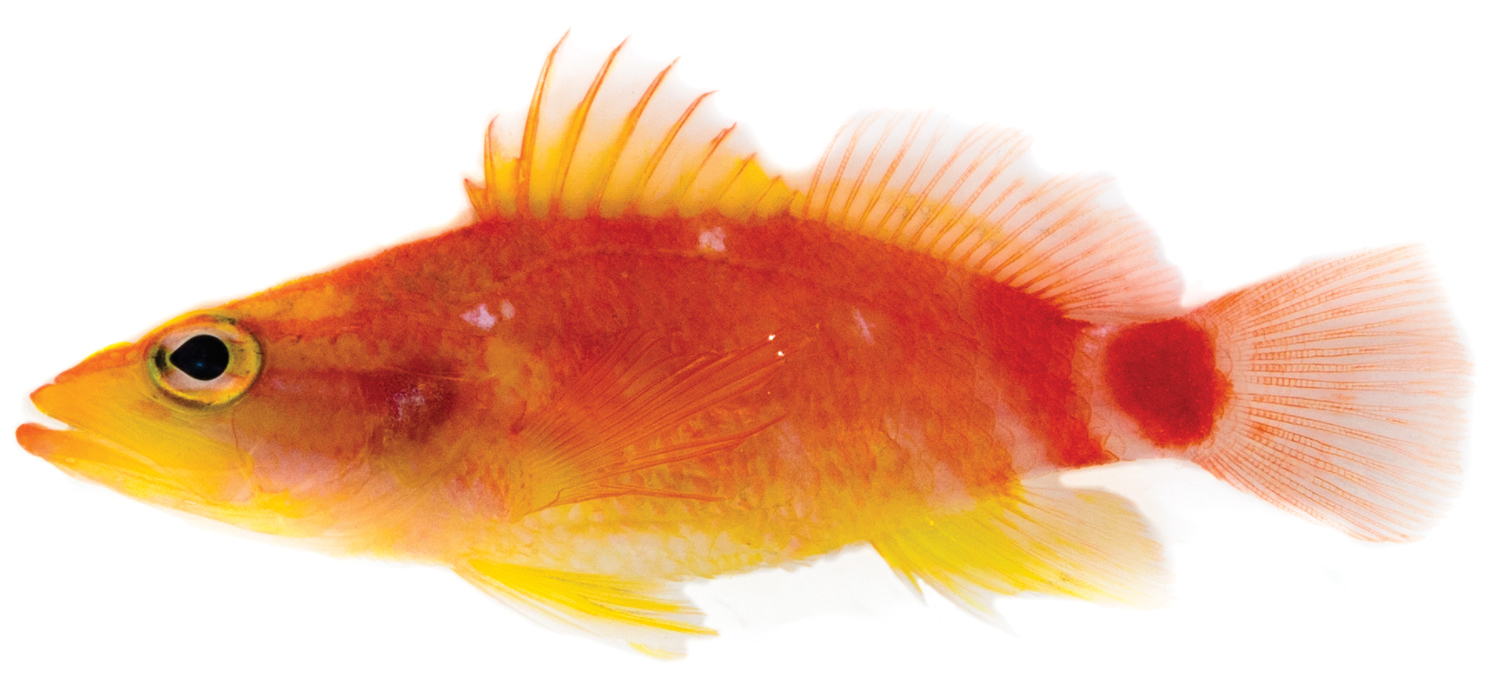

Scientific classification
- Kingdom: Animalia
- Phylum: Chordata
- Class: Actinopterygii
- Order: Perciformes
- Family: Anthiadidae
- Genus: Plectranthias
- Species: P. ahiahiata

Binomial name
- Plectranthias ahiahiata Shepherd, Phelps, Pinheiro, Perez-Matus & Rocha, 2018

= Plectranthias ahiahiata =

Species of fish

Plectranthias ahiahiata, the sunset perchlet, is a fish of the family Serranidae, subfamily Anthiinae. It is believed to be endemic to Rapa Nui (Easter Island) in the South Pacific. It was discovered at 90m depth during mesophotic coral ecosystem exploration by the deep diving team from the California Academy of Sciences.

== Etymology ==
The name "ahiahiata" means "the last moments of light before nightfall" in the Rapa Nui language, and it was given to this fish because it reminded the scientists who discovered it of the sunsets in Easter Island.
