= Plectranthias flammeus =

Conservation status
- Least Concern (IUCN 3.1)

Scientific classification
- Kingdom: Animalia
- Phylum: Chordata
- Class: Actinopterygii
- Order: Perciformes
- Family: Anthiadidae
- Genus: Plectranthias
- Species: P. flammeus

Binomial name
- Plectranthias flammeus J. T. Williams, Delrieu-Trottin & Planes, 2013

Species of fish

Plectranthias flammeus, the flame perchlet, is a species of fish in the family Serranidae occurring in the eastern-central Pacific Ocean.
