= Wheelerigobius =

Scientific classification
- Kingdom: Animalia
- Phylum: Chordata
- Class: Actinopterygii
- Order: Gobiiformes
- Family: Gobiidae
- Genus: Wheelerigobius; P. J. Miller, 1981

Type species
- Eleotris maltzani Steindachner, 1881

Genus of fishes

Wheelerigobius is a genus of gobies native to the eastern Atlantic Ocean. The name of this genus honours the British ichthyologist Alwyne C. Wheeler (1929-2005) who was the curator of Fishes at the British Museum (Natural History).

== Species ==
There are currently two recognized species in this genus:

- Wheelerigobius maltzani (Steindachner, 1881)
- Wheelerigobius wirtzi P. J. Miller, 1988 (Cameroon goby)
