= Plectranthias whiteheadi =

Conservation status
- Vulnerable (IUCN 2.3)

Scientific classification
- Kingdom: Animalia
- Phylum: Chordata
- Class: Actinopterygii
- Order: Perciformes
- Family: Anthiadidae
- Genus: Plectranthias
- Species: P. whiteheadi

Binomial name
- Plectranthias whiteheadi Randall, 1980

Synonyms
- Plectranthias chungchowensis S. C. Shen & Lin, 1984

Species of fish

Plectranthias whiteheadi, Whitehead's basslet, is a species of fish in the family Serranidae occurring in the Western Pacific. Little is known about this relatively small species which maximum length is about 7.8 cm SL.

IUCN has evaluated Plectranthias chungchowensis, but this species, described as endemic to Taiwan, is a junior synonym of P. whiteheadi.

== Size ==
This species reaches a length of 7.7 cm (3.0 in).

== Etymology ==
The fish is namedin honor of ichthyologist Peter J. P. Whitehead (1930-1993), of the British Museum of Natural History.
