= Plectranthias klausewitzi =

Scientific classification
- Domain: Eukaryota
- Kingdom: Animalia
- Phylum: Chordata
- Class: Actinopterygii
- Order: Perciformes
- Family: Anthiadidae
- Genus: Plectranthias
- Species: P. klausewitzi

Binomial name
- Plectranthias klausewitzi Zajonz, 2006

Species of fish

Plectranthias klausewitzi is a species of fish in the family Serranidae occurring in the western Indian Ocean.

== Size ==
This species reaches a length of 5.5 cm (2.2 in).

== Etymology ==
The fish is named in honor of Wolfgang Klausewitz (1922–2018), because of his contributions to the fish taxonomy and the zoogeography of the Indian Ocean.
