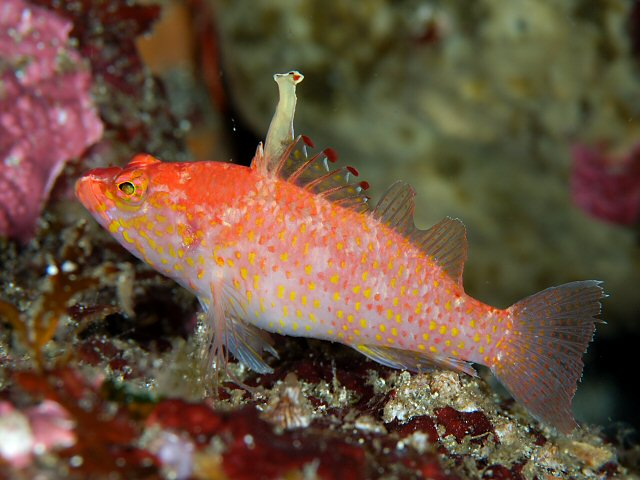

Conservation status
- Least Concern (IUCN 3.1)

Scientific classification
- Kingdom: Animalia
- Phylum: Chordata
- Class: Actinopterygii
- Order: Perciformes
- Family: Anthiadidae
- Genus: Plectranthias
- Species: P. altipinnatus

Binomial name
- Plectranthias altipinnatus Katayama & Masuda, 1980

= Plectranthias altipinnatus =

Species of fish

Plectranthias altipinnatus, also known as chigohanadai, is a species of fish in the family Serranidae occurring in the north-western Pacific Ocean.

== Size ==
This species reaches a length of 4.5 cm (1.8 in).
