= Plectranthias elaine =

Conservation status
- Data Deficient (IUCN 3.1)

Scientific classification
- Kingdom: Animalia
- Phylum: Chordata
- Class: Actinopterygii
- Order: Perciformes
- Family: Anthiadidae
- Genus: Plectranthias
- Species: P. elaine

Binomial name
- Plectranthias elaine Heemstra & J. E. Randall, 2009

Species of fish

Plectranthias elaine is a species of fish in the family Serranidae occurring in the western Indian Ocean.

== Size ==
This species reaches a length of 5.6 cm (2.2 in).

== Etymology ==
The fish is named in honor of Elaine Heemstra, the wife of the senior author, because of her "numerous and valuable contributions to the study of fishes by her beautiful and accurate paintings and drawings and her astute observations of these fascinating creatures".
