= Rotuman forest gecko =

Conservation status
- Critically endangered, possibly extinct (IUCN 3.1)

Scientific classification
- Kingdom: Animalia
- Phylum: Chordata
- Class: Reptilia
- Order: Squamata
- Suborder: Gekkota
- Family: Gekkonidae
- Genus: Lepidodactylus
- Species: L. gardineri

Binomial name
- Lepidodactylus gardineri Boulenger, 1897

Species of lizard

The Rotuman forest gecko (Lepidodactylus gardineri), also known commonly as the Rotuma forest gecko, is a species of lizard in the family Gekkonidae. The species is endemic to Rotuma Island, Fiji.

== Etymology ==
The specific name, gardineri, is in honor of British zoologist John Stanley Gardiner.

== Habitat ==
The preferred natural habitat of L. gardineri is forest, at altitudes from sea level to 256 m (840 ft).

== Behavior ==
L. gardineri is arboreal. It is found in dead tree branches, both beneath the bark and in termite galleries.

== Reproduction ==
L. gardineri is oviparous.
