= Alwyne Cooper Wheeler =

British ichthyologist (1929–2005)

- Born: 5 October 1929; Woodford Green
- Died: 19 June 2005 (aged 75)
- Citizenship: British
- Scientific career
- Fields: Zoologist, Ichthyologist
- Workplaces: Natural History Museum
- Author abbrev. (zoology): Wheeler

Alwyne (Wyn) Wheeler (5 October 1929 – 19 June 2005) was a British ichthyologist who was a curator at the Natural History Museum in London. He was educated at St Egbert's College, Chingford, and Chingford County High School to Higher School Certificate level, and was unusual in that his subsequent scientific career was achieved despite his never having obtained a university degree.

He joined the London Natural History Society at the age of 13 and served his National Service as a radiographer and medical photographer in the Royal Army Medical Corps in both the United Kingdom and Jamaica, where he joined the Natural History Society of Jamaica. On leaving the army he applied to the Natural History Museum for a post as an Assistant in the Department of Zoology, starting on 1 June 1950 as an assistant in the Fish Section. Wheeler spent his whole career in the Natural History Museum, retiring in 1989.

== Specialist for European fish ==
Wheeler specialized in two main fields, or that of the taxonomy of European fish, and of the studies of historical collections of taxonomic importance. He produced over a hundred different scientific publications and his most important work was The fishes of the British Isles and north-west Europe which was published in 1969 and became the standard, modern British ichthyology text. Other important publications included Fishes of the World (1975), Key to the Fishes of Northern Europe (1978), and The World Encyclopedia of Fishes (1985).

He was also a central figure in the monitoring of the clean up of the River Thames and the return of life to the river, and the findings were documented in The Tidal Thames; The History of a River and its Fishes (1979). Wyn Wheeler was a founding member of the Fisheries Society of the British Isles (FSBI).

As well as scientific publications Wheeler wrote columns in the more popular angling press giving biological information to anglers. He also adjudicated many rod caught records and in 1997 he announced that many of the largest specimens of Crucian carp Carassius carassius were invalid as they referred to wild goldfish Carassius auratus.

=== Archaeological identification ===
Wheeler's other expertise was developed in the identification of fish bone from archaeological sites, co-authoring a manual in 1989 on the identification of fish remains in archaeological sites.

== In publishing ==
As an editor of, and as to mentor the magazine to develop, Wheeler was associated with the Journal of the Society for the Bibliography of Natural History (now called Archives of Natural History). His term serving as the honorary editor was between 1967 and 1974, 1978 and 1986. He was again formally elected as honorary editor in 1989 while being an editor pro term from 1988 to 1989. Wheeler finally retired in 1999 after the publication of volume 26 (part 1).

Wheeler retired from the Natural History Museum in 1989. After retirement he worked at Epping Forest Conservation Centre and continued his association with the Museum in his capacity as an official Scientific Associate.

=== Authorship ===
His writings were published sometimes under the pen name Allan Cooper, mostly when publishing non-technical, popular articles and books. In 1992 he published A list of the common and scientific names of fishes of the British Isles, which was being revised when Wheeler contracted Alzheimer's disease and was completed by Nigel Merrett, his successor at the Museum, and Declan Quigley, being published in 2004.

== Legacy ==
The Alwyne Wheeler Bursary was established in 1999, on the occasion of Alwyne Wheeler's retirement as the Society for the History of Natural History's honorary editor. The bursary was established to facilitate original contributions to the study of the history of natural history by young scholars (under the age of 30). The name of the African goby genus Wheelerigobius honours Wheeler's contribution to ichthyology.

The FSBI established the "Wyn Wheeler Research Grant" in December 2005 following his passing in that June, to recognize his role as a founding member of the FSBI, as well as his post-retirement research activity. The Grant provides retired members of the FSBI with financial support for continued activity in fish biology.

== Taxon named in his honor ==
- Amblyeleotris wheeleri, the Gorgeous prawn-goby (Polunin & Lubbock, 1977) honors Wheeler, who was curator of Fishes at the British Museum (Natural History).
- The Spotted perchlet, Plectranthias wheeleri J. E. Randall, 1980 is a species of fish in the family Serranidae occurring in the Western Pacific Ocean.
- The fish genus Wheelerigobius P. J. Miller, 1981 is a genus of gobies native to the eastern Atlantic Ocean.

== Publications ==
- The fishes of the British Isles and north-west Europe (1969).
- Fishes of the World (1975).
- Key to the Fishes of Northern Europe (1978).
- The World Encyclopedia of Fishes (1985).
- A list of the common and scientific names of fishes of the British Isles (1992).

As editor/contributor

- Journal of the Society for the Bibliography of Natural History, up to volume 26 (part 1). Journal was renamed as Archives of Natural History. The honorary editor (1967–1974, 1978–1986, 1989–1999); an editor pro term 1988–1989).
- The Art of the First Fleet and Other Early Australian Drawings (Bernard Smith and Alwyne Wheeler, eds.). Melbourne: Oxford University Press, 1988

As Allan Cooper

- Animals of the world Africa. P. Hamlyn (1968).
- Cooper, Allan; Nickless, Will; Thompson, George; Smith, John. (1969) Fishes of the world. Hamlyn, "Hamlyn all-colour paperbacks", 060000094X.
- Fishes of the world. (1971) Bantam Books, "Knowledge through color " no. 18.

== Footnotes ==
=== References ===
- Crimmen, Oliver (2006). "Obituary Alwyne Wheeler 5 Oct. 1929—19 June 2005". The Linnean. 22 (4): 27–33.
- Crimmen, Oliver (2006). "Obituary Alwyne Wheeler 5 Oct. 1929—19 June 2005". Archives of Natural History. 33 (2): 354–362.
- Nelson, E. Charles (2006). "Obituary Alwyne Cooper Wheeler (1929-2005)". Archives of Natural History. 3 (2): 363–365.
