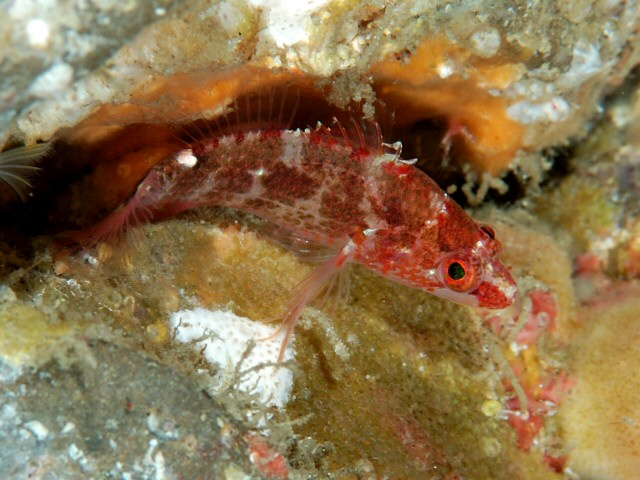

Conservation status
- Least Concern (IUCN 3.1)

Scientific classification
- Kingdom: Animalia
- Phylum: Chordata
- Class: Actinopterygii
- Order: Perciformes
- Family: Anthiadidae
- Genus: Plectranthias
- Species: P. longimanus

Binomial name
- Plectranthias longimanus (M. C. W. Weber, 1913)

Synonyms
- Pteranthias longimanus Weber, 1913

= Plectranthias longimanus =

Species of fish

Plectranthias longimanus, the longfin perchlet, is a species of fish in the family Serranidae occurring in the Indo-Pacific Ocean.

== Size ==
This species reaches a length of 3.5 cm (1.4 in).
