= Plectranthias exsul =

Scientific classification
- Kingdom: Animalia
- Phylum: Chordata
- Class: Actinopterygii
- Order: Perciformes
- Family: Anthiadidae
- Genus: Plectranthias
- Species: P. exsul

Binomial name
- Plectranthias exsul Heemstra & W. D. Anderson, 1983

Species of fish

Plectranthias exsul is a species of fish in the family Serranidae occurring in the western Indian Ocean.

== Size ==
This species reaches a length of 5.6 cm (2.2 in).
