= SS Vernon L. Kellogg =

World War II Liberty ship of the United States

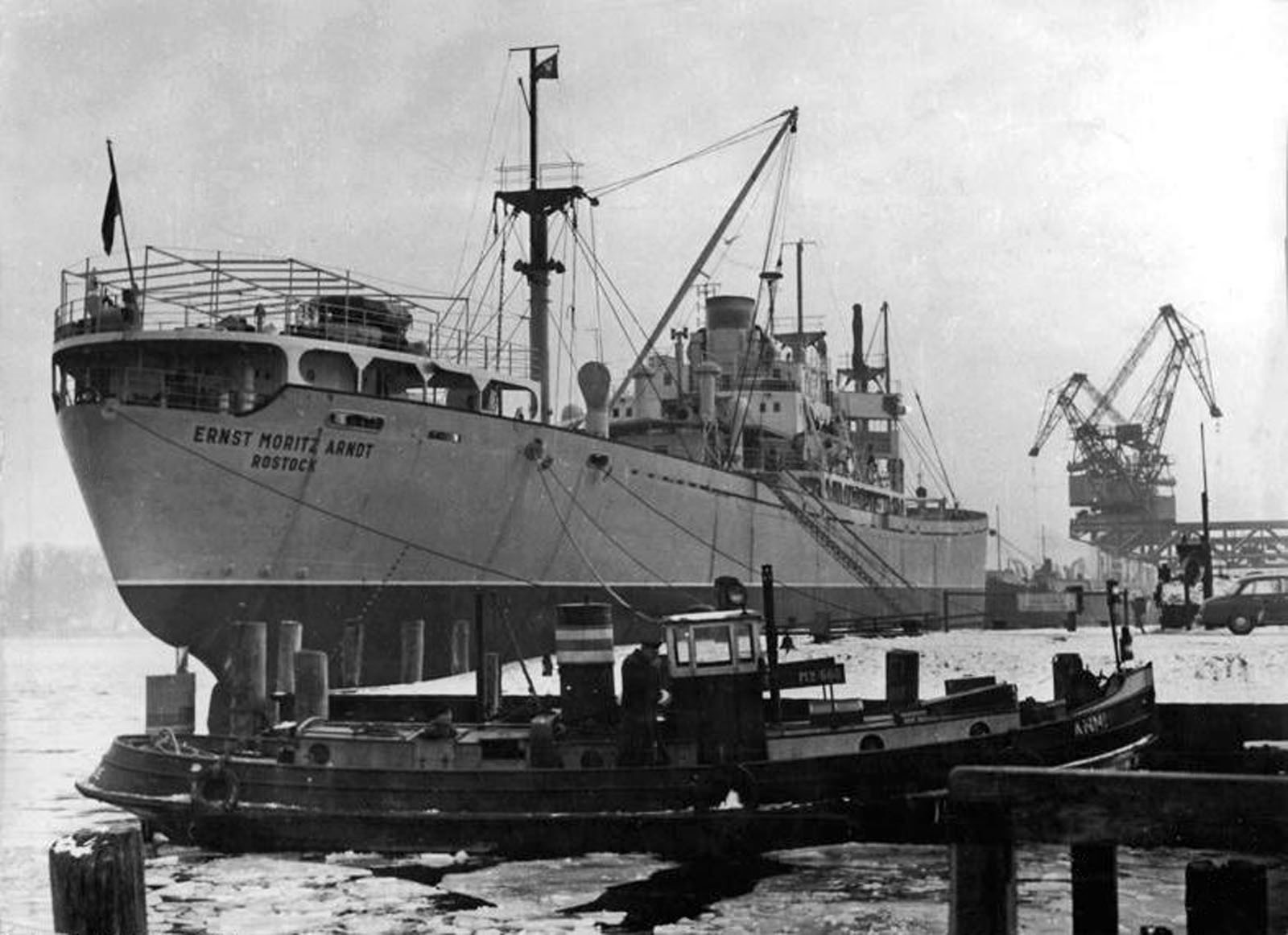
- Ernst Moritz Arndt on 4 February 1960

History

United States
- Name: Vernon L. Kellogg
- Namesake: Vernon L. Kellogg
- Builder: California Shipbuilding Corp
- Laid down: 20 June 1943
- Launched: 15 July 1943
- Commissioned: 28 July 1943
- Renamed: Wilfred, 1947; Folke Bernadotte, 1949; Archon Gabriel, 1949; Johann Gottlieb Fichte, 1958; Kypros, 1968
- Fate: Scrapped, 1971

General characteristics
- Class & type: Liberty ship
- Displacement: 14,245 long tons (14,474 t)
- Length: 441 ft 6 in (134.57 m) o/a; 417 ft 9 in (127.33 m) p/p; 427 ft (130 m) w/l
- Beam: 57 ft (17 m)
- Draft: 27 ft 9 in (8.46 m)
- Propulsion: Two oil-fired boilers; Triple-expansion steam engine; 2,500 hp (1,900 kW); Single screw
- Speed: 11 knots (20 km/h; 13 mph)
- Range: 20,000 nmi (37,000 km; 23,000 mi)
- Capacity: 10,856 t (10,685 long tons) deadweight (DWT)
- Crew: 81
- Armament: Stern-mounted 4 in (100 mm) deck gun for use against surfaced submarines, variety of anti-aircraft guns

SS Vernon L. Kellogg was an American Liberty ship built in 1943 for service in World War II. Her namesake was Vernon Lyman Kellogg, an American entomologist, evolutionary biologist, and science administrator.

== Design ==
Like other Liberty ships, she was 441 feet (134 m) long and 56 feet (17 m) wide, carried 9000 tons of cargo and had a top speed of 11 knots (20 km/h). Most Liberty ships were named after prominent deceased Americans.

== Construction and career ==
The keel of the ship was laid on June 20, 1943. Only 25 days later the California Shipbuilding Corp. launched in Los Angeles under the name Vernon L. Kellogg with hull number 224. Only 13 days later, on July 28, 1943, the vehicle was operational and was taken over by the War Shipping Administration, Los Angeles, and taken over by Grace Line brought into motion. The ship survived the World War II unscathed

From February 12, 1947, it appeared in the register as Wilfred under the Norwegian flag for AS Awilco, Oslo Mgrs. Anders Wilhelmsen & Co. In 1949 the ship was renamed Folke Bernadotte for another Norwegian owner. During a layover in September 1949, it was given the name Archon Gabriel and the new homeport in Puerto Limón in Costa Rica. From then on, the owner was Faros Shipping Ltd. headquartered in London. At the beginning of January 1958, the Archon Gabriel entered the Baltic Sea from Brazil. A full load of iron ore with the port of destination in Stettin was on board. On January 8, the ship ran aground off Greifswalder Oie for a reason that has not yet been clarified. The crew did not succeed in getting the ship afloat again on their own.

As a first rescue measure, the ship was lightened. Around 1,000 tons of ore were taken over by excavator barges and the Timmendorf coaster. With the help of three smugglers an attempt was made to get the liberated Archon Gabriel free. This first attempt with the tugs Warnow (500 PS), Uecker (500 PS) of VEB Schiffsbergung und Taucherei, and the salvage tug Wismar (1,440 PS) of the former naval forces of the GDR remained unsuccessful. Only with the help of other tugs like Eisvogel (1,100 HP) and Recknitz (500 HP) could the ship be towed free for a short time on January 17, 1958. Due to the shallow water, however, it stuck again. Five days later it was possible to get the ship free again. It was towed slowly towards Stettin. In an unexplained way, it ran aground again on a sandbank in the entrance to Swinoujscie. The recovery there took six more days. On February 6, 1958, the ship docked in Stettin and the rest of the cargo could be unloaded. In the meantime, considerable salvage costs had been incurred, which the owner of the ship could not or would not pay.

The salvage company VEB Schiffsbergung und Taucherei Stralsund had the vehicle confiscated and handed it over to the German shipping company Rostock on June 30, 1958. In the meantime the ship was renamed after the German educator and philosopher Johann Gottlieb Fichte.

Unexpectedly, while the repair work was still being carried out, the DSR received a letter in mid-July from the head of a department in the GDR Ministry of Transport's Shipping Administration stating that the name Johann Gottlieb Fichte should not be used under any circumstances for the former ship Archon Gabriel. The ship should be called Ernst Moritz Arndt. The steamer has been given a new name for the sixth time, despite additional costs and bureaucracy. Protests by the shipping company were dismissed. The then main department head Müller said rigorously when asked over the phone that, “There will never be a ship with the name Johann Gottlieb Fichte in the GDR merchant fleet.” However just two years later, a teaching and cargo ship was christened with this name. Many years later this ship became known in the GDR through the TV series of the GDR television "Zur See".

The general repairs and test drives of the cargo ship dragged on in the Gdańsk shipyard Stocznia Remontowa Nauta until January 1960. On January 31, 1960, there was another official handover to the DSR. Upon arrival in Rostock's city port in early February, the Ernst Moritz Arndt was the shipping company's fourth steamship. It was also needed to train machinists for the growing fleet. It was used in the apatite voyage from Soviet Murmansk and for general cargo transport to socialist Cuba. In 1962, extensive renovation work was carried out on the ship. This included converting the safety and rescue facilities such as modernizing the boat davits and converting the chimney. It was restored to the original Admiralty top shape of the early Liberty ships. In the summer of 1968 the steamer was sold to Spiritath Cia. Navigation S.A. Famagusta in Cyprus. Under the name Kypros, the ship left Rostock on June 18, 1968. After a further three years of operation, it reached Taiwan in August 1971 to be scrapped.
