= Plectranthias garrupellus =

Conservation status
- Least Concern (IUCN 3.1)

Scientific classification
- Kingdom: Animalia
- Phylum: Chordata
- Class: Actinopterygii
- Order: Perciformes
- Family: Anthiadidae
- Genus: Plectranthias
- Species: P. garrupellus

Binomial name
- Plectranthias garrupellus C. R. Robins & Starck, 1961

Species of fish

Plectranthias garrupellus, the apricot bass, is a species of fish in the family Serranidae occurring in the western Atlantic Ocean.

== Size ==
This species reaches a length of 10.0 cm (3.9 in).
