= Plectranthias parini =

Scientific classification
- Domain: Eukaryota
- Kingdom: Animalia
- Phylum: Chordata
- Class: Actinopterygii
- Order: Perciformes
- Family: Anthiadidae
- Genus: Plectranthias
- Species: P. parini

Binomial name
- Plectranthias parini W. D. Anderson & J. E. Randall, 1991

Species of fish

Plectranthias parini, Parin's anthias, is a species of fish in the family Serranidae occurring in the south-eastern Pacific Ocean.

== Etymology ==
The fish is named in honor of ichthyologist Nikolai Vasil’evich Parin (1932-2012), of the Russian Academy of Sciences, who provided the holotype specimen and a color transparency of it.
