= Florence E. Bemis =

American entomologist

- Occupation: entomologist
- Employer: Stanford University

Florence Eugenie Bemis (1861?–?) was a late 19th and early 20th century American entomologist and expert in whiteflies.

== Scientific career ==
Bemis worked at Stanford University in the laboratory of entomologist Vernon Lyman Kellogg and in the field collecting specimens and making biological observations. She studied insects of the Aleyrodidae family, which are known as whiteflies and at the time were also called mealy-winged flies for the waxy white secretion that covers their wings. In 1904, she published a long monograph on a subset of these insects, entitled The Aleyrodds, or Mealy-Winged Flies, of California, with References to Other American Species. In it she described 19 new species of whiteflies found in California, together with a catalogue of whitefly species found elsewhere in America. Although she placed them all in the genus Aleyrodes, many of them have since been moved into other whitefly genera, including Aleuropleurocelus, Aleuroparadoxus, Aleurothrixus, Pealius, Tetraleurodes, and Trialeurodes. Her work is credited with greatly advancing knowledge of California species of whiteflies.

The taxonomic genus Bemisia within the family Aleyrodidae, comprising some of the whiteflies, is named in her honor.

== Species discovered ==
- Aleyrodes amnicola
- Aleyrodes diasemus
- Aleyrodes errans: now Tetraleurodes errans
- Aleyrodes extraniens
- Aleyrodes glacialis: now Trialeurodes glacialis
- Aleyrodes hutchingsi: now Trialeurodes hutchingsi
- Aleyrodes interrogationis: now Aleurothrixus interrogationis
- Aleyrodes iridescens: now Aleuroparadoxus iridescens
- Aleyrodes kelloggi: now Pealius kelloggi
- Aleyrodes madroni: now Trialeurodes madroni
- Aleyrodes maskelli: now Pealius maskelli
- Aleyrodes merlini: now Trialeurodes merlini
- Aleyrodes nigrans: now Aleuropleurocelus nigrans
- Aleyrodes pruinosus
- Aleyrodes quaintancei
- Aleyrodes stanfordi
- Aleyrodes splendens: now Tetraleurodes errans
- Aleyrodes tentaculatus: now Trialeurodes tentaculatus
- Aleyrodes wellmanae

== See also ==
- List of whitefly species
