= Plectranthias yamakawai =

Conservation status
- Least Concern (IUCN 3.1)

Scientific classification
- Kingdom: Animalia
- Phylum: Chordata
- Class: Actinopterygii
- Order: Perciformes
- Family: Anthiadidae
- Genus: Plectranthias
- Species: P. yamakawai

Binomial name
- Plectranthias yamakawai Yoshino, 1972

Species of fish

Plectranthias yamakawai is a species of fish in the family Serranidae occurring in the western Pacific Ocean.

== Size ==
This species reaches a length of 20.0 cm (7.9 in).

== Etymology ==
The fish is named in honor of ichthyologist Takeshi Yamakawa (b. 1942), of Kochi University, who was the one who first collected and reported this species.
