= Plectranthias anthioides =

Scientific classification
- Domain: Eukaryota
- Kingdom: Animalia
- Phylum: Chordata
- Class: Actinopterygii
- Order: Perciformes
- Family: Anthiadidae
- Genus: Plectranthias
- Species: P. anthioides

Binomial name
- Plectranthias anthioides (Günther, 1872)

Synonyms
- Plectropoma anthioides Günther, 1872

Species of fish

Plectranthias anthioides is a species of fish in the family Serranidae occurring in the western Pacific Ocean.

== Size ==
This species reaches a length of 25.0 cm (9.8 in).
