= Plectranthias kamii =

Conservation status
- Least Concern (IUCN 3.1)

Scientific classification
- Kingdom: Animalia
- Phylum: Chordata
- Class: Actinopterygii
- Order: Perciformes
- Family: Anthiadidae
- Genus: Plectranthias
- Species: P. kamii

Binomial name
- Plectranthias kamii J. E. Randall, 1980

Species of fish

Plectranthias kamii is a species of fish in the family Serranidae occurring in the Pacific Ocean.

== Size ==
This species reaches a length of 23.0 cm (9.1 in).

== Etymology ==
The fish is named in honor of Harry T. Kami, of the Division of Fish and Wildlife on Guam, who donated the type specimen to the Bishop Museum in Honolulu and suspected that it might be an undescribed species.
