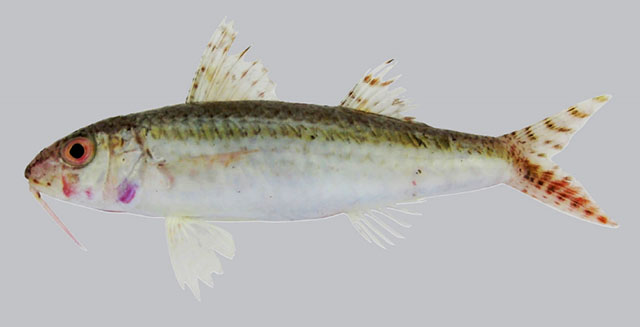

Scientific classification
- Kingdom: Animalia
- Phylum: Chordata
- Class: Actinopterygii
- Order: Syngnathiformes
- Family: Mullidae
- Genus: Upeneus
- Species: U. asymmetricus

Binomial name
- Upeneus asymmetricus Lachner, 1954

= Asymmetrical goatfish =

Species of ray-finned fish

The asymmetrical goatfish (Upeneus asymmetricus) is a species of marine ray-finned fish, a goatfish from the family Mullidae which is found in Indo-West Pacific. This species can reach a length of 30 centimetres (12 in) TL. Asymmetrical goatfish is a good food fish.
