= Upeneus heemstra =

Conservation status
- Least Concern (IUCN 3.1)

Scientific classification
- Kingdom: Animalia
- Phylum: Chordata
- Class: Actinopterygii
- Order: Syngnathiformes
- Family: Mullidae
- Genus: Upeneus
- Species: U. heemstra

Binomial name
- Upeneus heemstra Uiblein & Gouws, 2014

Species of goatfish

Upeneus heemstra, the Heemstra's goatfish, is a species of ray-finned fish in the genus Upeneus. It was first described by Franz Uiblein and Gavin Gouws in 2014.

== Distribution and habitat ==
Upeneus heemstra is a marine demersal species mostly found across the western Indian Ocean, with a range extending from Mozambique to the central Red Sea, including western India and Sri Lanka. It typically occurs on soft sand and muddy seabeds close to coral reef areas. It is found at depths between 0 and 12 metres.

== Description ==
It has an elongated body, slightly compressed laterally, with a pointed head profile and large eyes. The maximum recorded length is 15 cm. The barbels are yellowish. The coloration is predominantly brown on the back, where there are darker streaks that end at the caudal peduncle, and pale on the belly, where there are many small dark or reddish spots. Spots and streaks are also present on the fins, particularly on the caudal fin, which is forked, where there are 12 oblique stripes of variable coloration.

== Biology ==
=== Behaviour ===
It usually does not form groups.

=== Feeding ===
It is carnivorous and its diet consists mainly of small marine invertebrates.

== Conservation ==
According to the IUCN, Upeneus heemstra is classified as Least Concern.
