= Phil Heemstra =

American-South African ichthyologist (1941–2019)

- Born: Phil Clarence Heemstra; 9 December 1941; Melrose Park, Illinois, United States
- Died: 29 August 2019 (aged 77)
- Education: University of Illinois Urbana-Champaign; University of Miami
- Spouse: Elaine Margaret Heemstra
- Children: 3
- Scientific career
- Fields: Ichthyologist

Phillip Clarence Heemstra (9 December 1941 – 29 August 2019) was an American-South African ichthyologist. He was born in Melrose Park, Illinois, United States as the son of Clarence William Heemstra and his wife, Lydia (born Epcke). He attended school in Ottawa, Illinois, and completed a B.Sc. in Zoology in 1963 at the University of Illinois Urbana-Champaign, as well as his MSc degree (1968) and doctorate (1974) in marine biology at the University of Miami in Florida. He moved to live in South Africa in 1978.

At the time of his death, Heemstra was a curator emeritus of the South African Institute of Aquatic Biodiversity (SAIAB, formerly the J.L.B. Smith Institute of Ichthyology). He specialized in ichthyology and marine fish taxonomy.

== Career ==
Heemstra was, among other things, a biologist at the marine laboratory of the U.S. Department of Natural Resources in Florida, and from 1978 to 2001 a curator of fish at J.L.B. Smith Institute of Ichthyology in Grahamstown (now the SAIAB).

His work included research on systematics, biology (especially reproduction), zoo-geography and marine fish conservation, a survey of the fish diversity of Southern Africa and the western Indian Ocean, and the identification of marine fish for institutions in South Africa and overseas. He has also been a consultant to numerous publications and the author or co-author of several books, including Coastal Fishes of Southern Africa with Elaine Heemstra. He received many honours from various institutions.

== Taxa described by Heemstra ==
- Argyrosomus inodorus, Griffiths & Heemstra, 1995, silver kob
- Apristurus canutus, S. Springer & Heemstra, 1979, hoary catshark
- Parapercis albiventer, H.C. Ho, Heemstr & Imamura, 2014, whitebelly sandperch,
- Plectranthias elaine Heemstra & J.E. Randall, 2009.
- Plectranthias exsul Heemstra & W.D. Anderson, 1983
- Apristurus parvipinnis, S. Springer & Heemstra, 1979, smallfin catshark
- Pseudanthias connelli (Heemstra & J.E. Randall, 1986) (Harlequin goldie)
- Pseudanthias conspicuus (Heemstra, 1973)
- Pseudanthias pillai Heemstra & Akhilesh, 2012
- Pseudanthias pulcherrimus (Heemstra & J. E. Randall, 1986) (Resplendent goldie)

== Memberships ==
He was a member of, among others, the Zoological Society of Southern Africa, the Ichthyological Society of Japan, the American Society of Ichthyologists and Herpetologists, and the Society of Systematic Biologists.

== Taxa named in his honor ==
- Pseudanthias heemstrai, the orange-headed anthias
- Upeneus heemstra Ublien & Gouws, 2014 (Heemstra goatfish)
- Cociella heemstrai Knapp 1996
- Pteropsaron heemstrai Nelson 1982
- Acropoma heemstrai Okamoto & Golani, 2017
- Aseraggodes heemstrai Randall & Gon 2006
- Neocaristius heemstrai (I. A. Trunov, E. I. Kukuev & Parin 2006)
- Mascarenichthys heemstrai Schwarzhans & Møller 2007
- Kenyaconger heemstrai D. G. Smith & Karmovskaya, 2003

== Personal life ==
Heemstra married Elaine Margaret Grant on 15 March 1991; Elaine has a son, Andrew Grant. Phil and his first wife, Valerie, had two daughters, Lydia and Julia.
