= Pierre Fourmanoir =

French ichthyologist

- Born: 1924
- Died: 2007
- Known for: Identification of many new species of fish
- Scientific career
- Fields: Ichthyology
- Institutions: New Caledonia, Madagascar

Pierre Fourmanoir (1924–2007) was a French ichthyologist working mainly in New Caledonia. He described many new species of fish including several sharks.

== Career ==
He was the FAO Regional Fisheries Officer, in Madagascar.

== Taxon described by him ==
- See Category:Taxa named by Pierre Fourmanoir

== Taxon named in his honor ==
- The Doublespot perchlet, Plectranthias fourmanoiri J. E. Randall, 1980 is a species of fish in the family Serranidae occurring in the Indo-Pacific Ocean.
