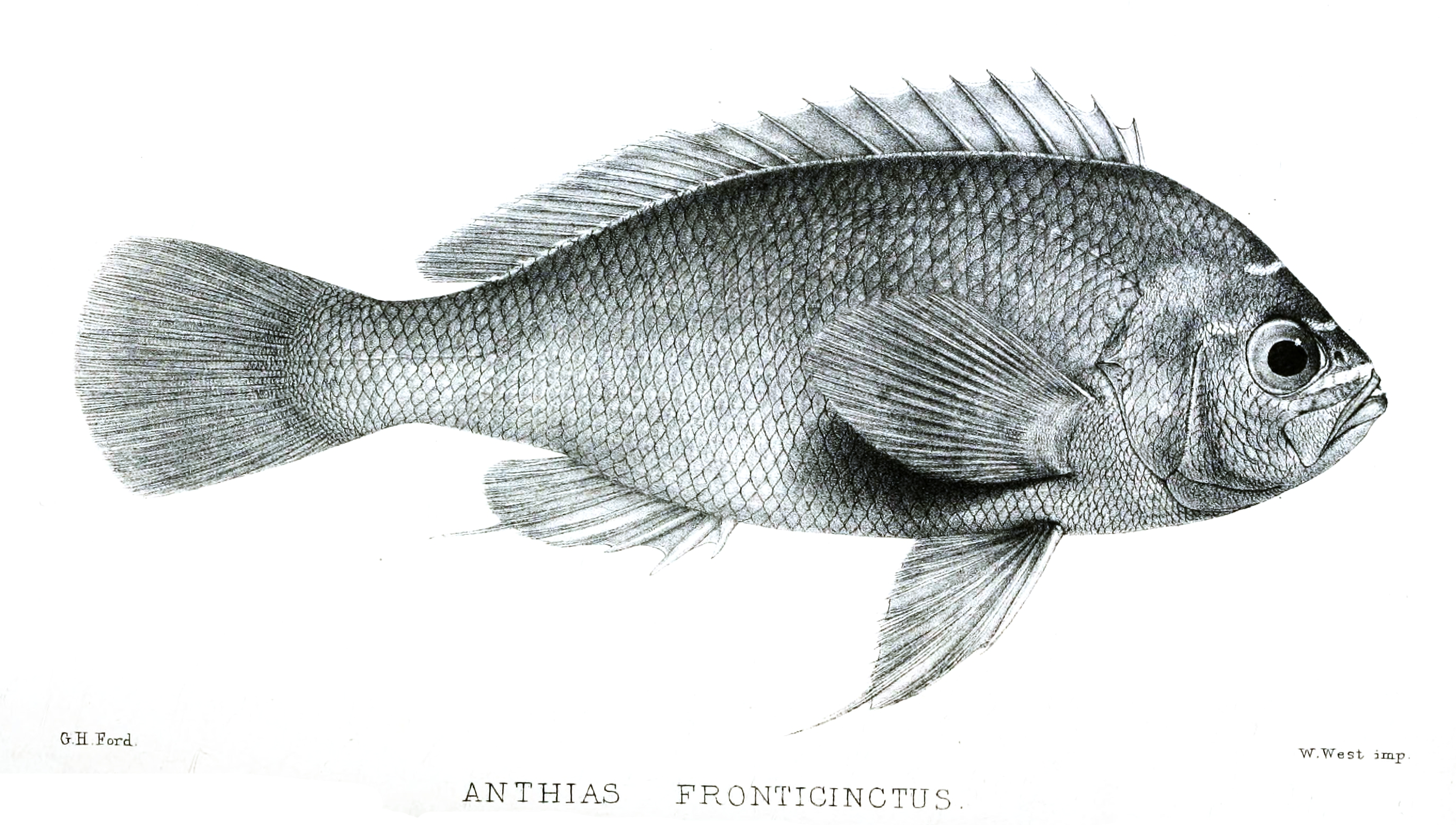
- Holanthias fronticinctus

Scientific classification
- Kingdom: Animalia
- Phylum: Chordata
- Class: Actinopterygii
- Order: Perciformes
- Family: Anthiadidae
- Genus: Holanthias; Günther, 1868

Type species
- Anthias fronticinctus Günther, 1868

Species
- 2, see text

= Holanthias =

Genus of ray-finned fishes

Holanthias is a genus of colourful marine ray-finned fishes in the family Anthiadidae. The two species are restricted to fairly deep reefs in the Southeast Atlantic. Both reach a length of about 22 cm (8.7 in).

== Species ==
In the past this genus included more species, but these have now been moved to other genera; Meganthias, Odontanthias and Pronotogrammus. Based on FishBase, the following two species are currently included in Holanthias:

- Holanthias caudalis Trunov, 1976 – Ascension
- Holanthias fronticinctus (Günther, 1868) (St Helena sea perch) – Saint Helena
