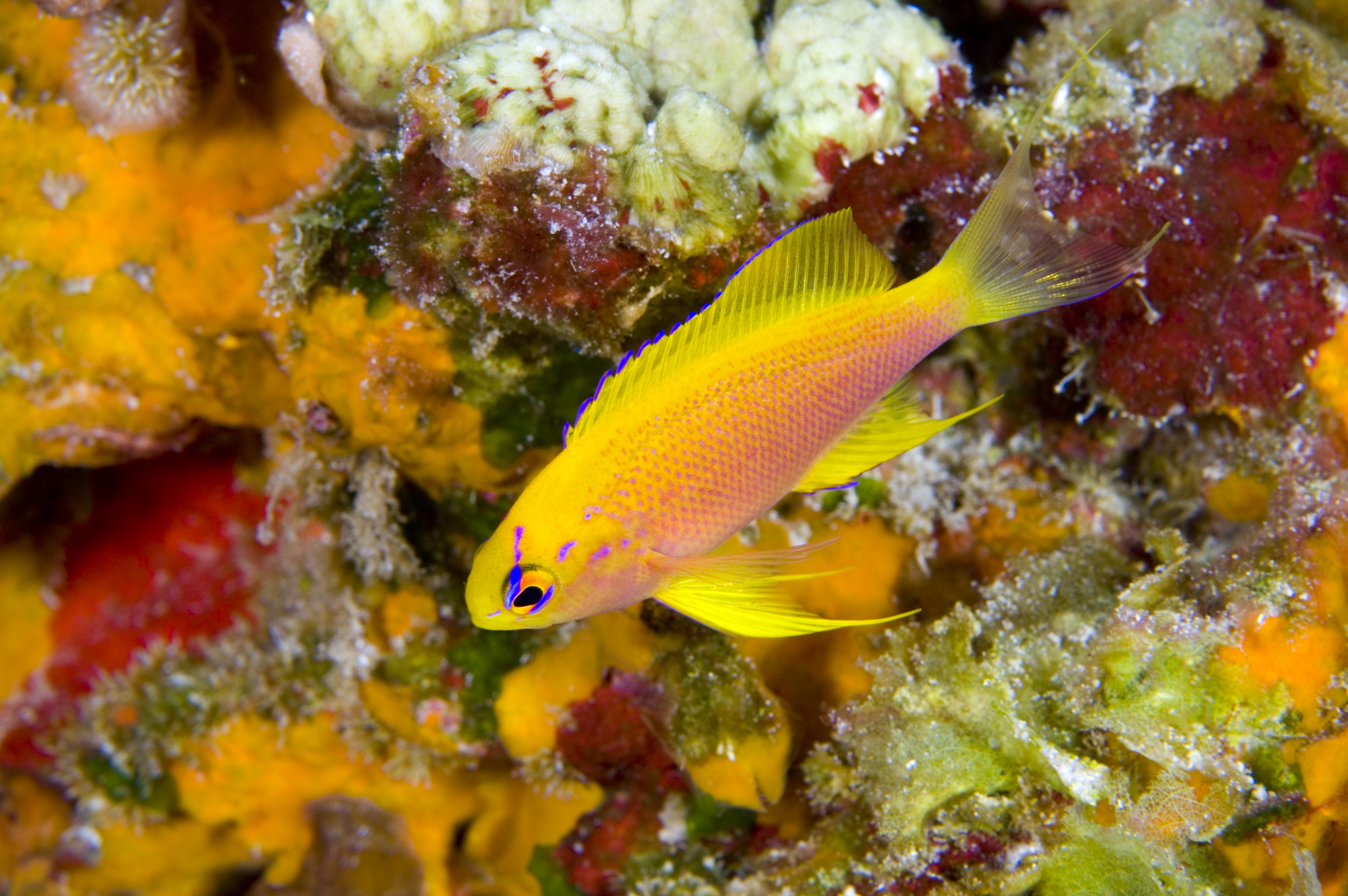
- Compsanthias hawaiiensis

Scientific classification
- Kingdom: Animalia
- Phylum: Chordata
- Class: Actinopterygii
- Order: Perciformes
- Family: Anthiadidae
- Genus: Compsanthias; Gill, 2024

Type species
- Anthias ventralis Randall, 1979

= Compsanthias =

Genus of fishes

Compsanthias is a genus of colourful reef fishes belonging to the family Anthiadidae. They are found in the Indo-Pacific.

== Species ==
These are two currently recognized species (both formerly assigned to Pseudanthias) in this genus:

- Compsanthias hawaiiensis (Randall, 1979)
- Compsanthias ventralis (Randall, 1979)
