= Selenanthias myersi =

Conservation status
- Least Concern (IUCN 3.1)

Scientific classification
- Kingdom: Animalia
- Phylum: Chordata
- Class: Actinopterygii
- Order: Perciformes
- Family: Serranidae
- Genus: Selenanthias
- Species: S. myersi

Binomial name
- Selenanthias myersi Randall, 1995

Species of ray-finned fish

Selenanthias myersi is a species of ray-finned fish in the family Anthiadidae. It is native to the tropical western and central Pacific Ocean.

== Description ==
The standard length of this fish is 8.7 cm (3.4 in).

== Distribution and habitat ==
Selenanthias myersi is known from three locations in the northwestern Pacific Ocean; two locations in the South China Sea and one in the Northern Mariana Islands. It is a demersal fish and it occurs on reefs in the depth range between 110 and 220 m (360 and 720 ft).

== Status ==
As a small, deep water reef species, Selenanthias myersi is not of interest to fisheries. No particular threats are known and it is likely that it occurs in a wider range of locations than is currently known. The International Union for Conservation of Nature has assessed its status as being of "least concern".
