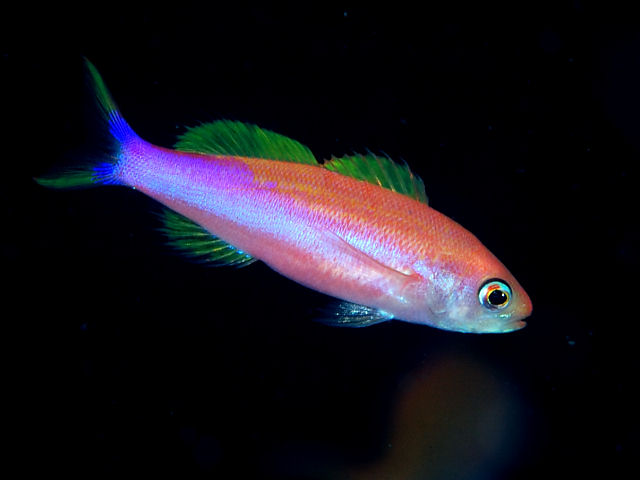

Conservation status
- Least Concern (IUCN 3.1)

Scientific classification
- Kingdom: Animalia
- Phylum: Chordata
- Class: Actinopterygii
- Order: Perciformes
- Family: Anthiadidae
- Genus: Luzonichthys
- Species: L. taeniatus

Binomial name
- Luzonichthys taeniatus J. E. Randall & J. E. McCosker, 1992

= Luzonichthys taeniatus =

Species of fish

Luzonichthys taeniatus, known as the striped splitfin, is a species of marine ray-finned fish in the family Anthiadidae. It is known from the Banda Sea in Indonesia.
