= Pelontrus maugei =

Conservation status
- Data Deficient (IUCN 3.1)

Scientific classification
- Kingdom: Animalia
- Phylum: Chordata
- Class: Actinopterygii
- Order: Perciformes
- Family: Anthiadidae
- Genus: Pelontrus
- Species: P. maugei

Binomial name
- Pelontrus maugei (J. E. Randall, 1980)

Synonyms
- Plectranthias maugei

Species of fish

Pelontrus maugei is a species of fish in the family Serranidae occurring in the western Indian Ocean.

== Size ==
This species reaches a length of 5.8 cm (2.3 in).

== Etymology ==
The fish is named in honor of accountant-turned-ichthyologist André L. Maugé (1922-2008), of the Muséum national d'Histoire naturelle in Paris, who was the one who collected the type specimens and made drawing of holotype.
