= Luzonichthys earlei =

Scientific classification
- Kingdom: Animalia
- Phylum: Chordata
- Class: Actinopterygii
- Division: Teleostei
- Order: Perciformes
- Family: Anthiadidae
- Genus: Luzonichthys
- Species: L. earlei

Binomial name
- Luzonichthys earlei Randall, 1981

Species of fish

Luzonichthys earlei, known as Earle's splitfin, is a species of marine ray-finned fish in the family Anthiadidae.

It was first described in 1981 by American ichthyologist John Ernest Randall.
