= Pelontrus vexillarius =

Conservation status
- Data Deficient (IUCN 3.1)

Scientific classification
- Kingdom: Animalia
- Phylum: Chordata
- Class: Actinopterygii
- Order: Perciformes
- Family: Anthiadidae
- Genus: Pelontrus
- Species: P. vexillarius

Binomial name
- Pelontrus vexillarius (J. E. Randall, 1980)

Synonyms
- Plectranthias vexillarius

Species of fish

Pelontrus vexillarius is a species of fish in the family Anthiadidae occurring in the western Indian Ocean.

== Size ==
This species reaches a length of 8.2 cm (3.2 in).
