= Pelontrus foresti =

Scientific classification
- Kingdom: Animalia
- Phylum: Chordata
- Class: Actinopterygii
- Order: Perciformes
- Family: Anthiadidae
- Genus: Pelontrus
- Species: P. foresti

Binomial name
- Pelontrus foresti (Fourmanoir, 1977)

Synonyms
- Plectranthias foresti

Species of fish

Pelontrus foresti is a species of fish in the family Serranidae occurring in the western-central Pacific Ocean.

== Size ==
This species reaches a length of 7.3 cm (2.9 in).

== Etymology ==
The fish is named in honor of carcinologist Jacques Forest (1920-2012), who led the MUSORSTOM exploratory cruise (jointly sponsored by the Institut français de Recherche Scientifique pour le Développement en Coopération [ORSTOM] and the Muséum national d’Histoire naturelle in Paris to the Philippines, during which time the type specimen was collected.
