= Odontanthias fuscipinnis =

Conservation status
- Least Concern (IUCN 3.1)

Scientific classification
- Kingdom: Animalia
- Phylum: Chordata
- Class: Actinopterygii
- Order: Perciformes
- Family: Anthiadidae
- Genus: Odontanthias
- Species: O. fuscipinnis

Binomial name
- Odontanthias fuscipinnis (Jenkins, 1901)

Synonyms
- Anthias fuscipinnis Jenkins, 1901; Holanthias fuscipinnis (Jenkins, 1901)

Species of ray-finned fish

Odontanthias fuscipinnis, the Hawaiian deep anthias or Hawaiian yellow anthias, is a species of marine ray-finned fish in the family Anthiadidae. It is endemic to the Hawaiian Islands.

== Description ==
As a member of the genus Odontanthias, it possesses a deep, compressed body and filamentous extensions on the dorsal and anal fins. Unlike many other anthias species that exhibit strong sexual dimorphism, both males and females of O. fuscipinnis share a similar bright yellow appearance.

== Range ==
This species is found exclusively in the tropical waters of the Central Pacific, specifically around the Hawaiian Islands and Johnston Atoll. It is found at depths ranging from 43 to 260 m (141 to 853 ft).
