= Pelontrus alcocki =

Conservation status
- Data Deficient (IUCN 3.1)

Scientific classification
- Kingdom: Animalia
- Phylum: Chordata
- Class: Actinopterygii
- Order: Perciformes
- Family: Anthiadidae
- Genus: Pelontrus
- Species: P. alcocki

Binomial name
- Pelontrus alcocki (Bineesh, Gopalakrishnan & Jena, 2014)

Synonyms
- Plectranthias alcocki

Species of fish

Pelontrus alcocki, or Alcock's deep-reef basslet, is a species of fish in the family Serranidae occurring in the western Indian Ocean.

== Size ==
This species reaches a length of 7.2 cm (2.8 in).

== Etymology ==
The fish is named in honor of physician-naturalist Alfred William Alcock (1859–1933), Superintendent of the Indian Museum in West Bengal, India, in recognition of his contribution to the taxonomy of the deep-sea fauna of Indian seas.
