= Odontanthias elizabethae =

Scientific classification
- Kingdom: Animalia
- Phylum: Chordata
- Class: Actinopterygii
- Order: Perciformes
- Family: Anthiadidae
- Genus: Odontanthias
- Species: O. elizabethae

Binomial name
- Odontanthias elizabethae Fowler, 1923

Species of ray-finned fish

Odontanthias elizabethae, the Elizabeth's Anthias, is a species of marine ray-finned fish in the family Anthiadidae. It is endemic to the Hawaiian Islands.

The species name elizabethae honors Elizabeth Fowler, the wife of Henry Weed Fowler.
