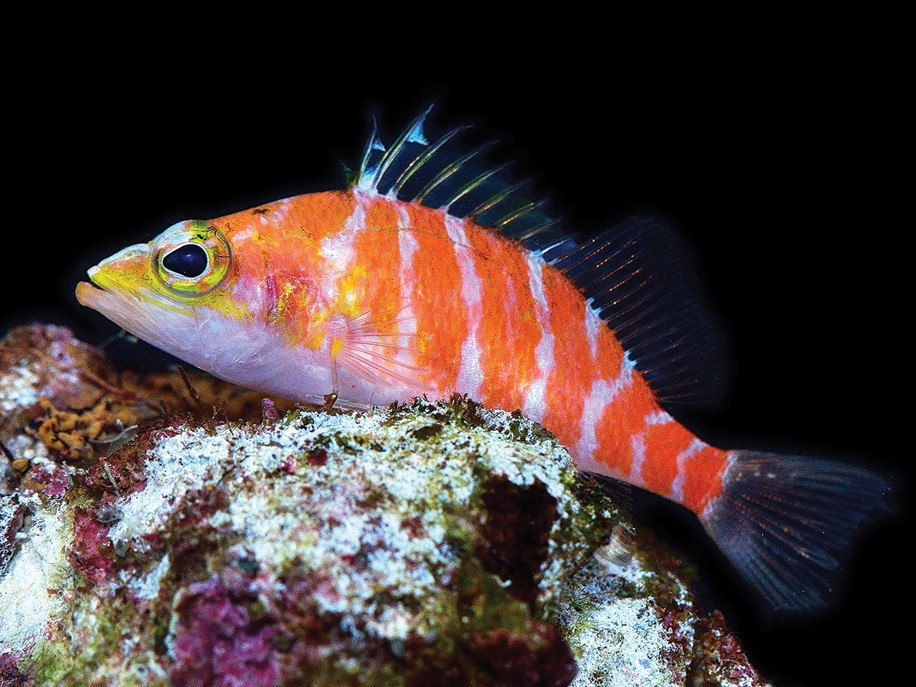

Scientific classification
- Kingdom: Animalia
- Phylum: Chordata
- Class: Actinopterygii
- Order: Perciformes
- Family: Anthiadidae
- Genus: Pelontrus
- Species: P. bennetti

Binomial name
- Pelontrus bennetti (G. R. Allen & F. M. Walsh, 2015)

Synonyms
- Plectranthias bennetti

= Pelontrus bennetti =

Species of fish

Pelontrus bennetti, or Bennett's perchlet, is a species of fish in the family Serranidae occurring in the western Pacific Ocean.

== Size ==
This species reaches a length of 5.0 cm (2.0 in).

== Etymology ==
The fish is named in honor of Timothy Bennett (b. 1960), an Australian diver and a marine aquarium-fish collector, who captured the holotype specimen.
