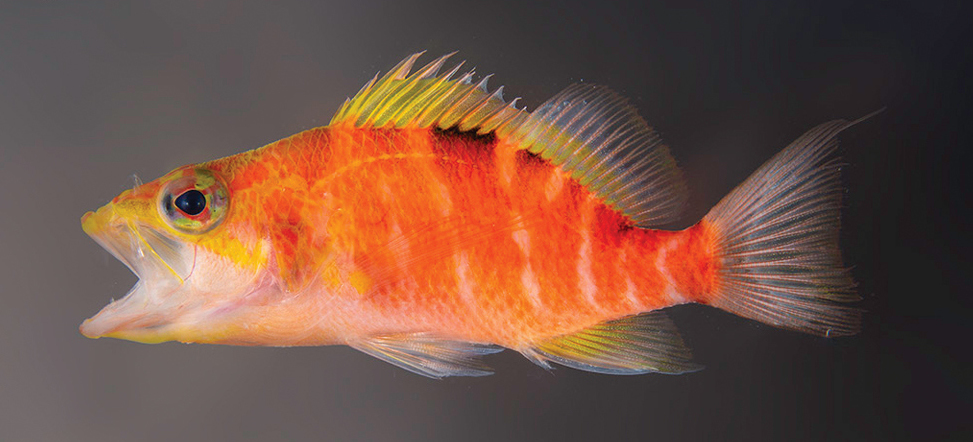

Scientific classification
- Kingdom: Animalia
- Phylum: Chordata
- Class: Actinopterygii
- Order: Perciformes
- Family: Anthiadidae
- Genus: Pelontrus
- Species: P. hinano

Binomial name
- Pelontrus hinano (Shepherd, Phelps, Pinheiro, Rocha & Rocha, 2020)

Synonyms
- Plectranthias hinano

= Pelontrus hinano =

Species of fish

Pelontrus hinano, or Hinano's perchlet, is a species of fish in the family Serranidae occurring in the north-western Pacific Ocean.

== Size ==
This species reaches a length of 5.0 cm (2.0 in).

== Etymology ==
The fish is named in honor of Teurumereariki Hinano Teavai Murphy, a former associate director of the University of California Berkeley Gump Research Station and the president of the cultural association Te Pu Atitia, because of her significant contributions to Polynesian biocultural heritage and field research in Moorea, French Polynesia.
