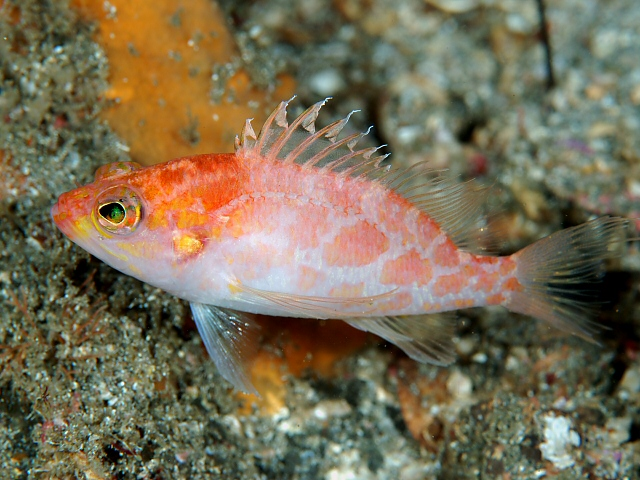

Scientific classification
- Kingdom: Animalia
- Phylum: Chordata
- Class: Actinopterygii
- Order: Perciformes
- Family: Anthiadidae
- Genus: Pelontrus
- Species: P. sagamiensis

Binomial name
- Pelontrus sagamiensis (Katayama, 1964)

Synonyms
- Zacallanthias sagamiensis Katayama, 1964; Plectranthias sagamiensis (Katayama, 1964)

= Pelontrus sagamiensis =

Species of fish

Pelontrus sagamiensis is a species of fish in the family Serranidae. It is found in the western Pacific Ocean.

== Description ==
Pelontrus sagamiensis reaches a standard length of 6.0 cm (2.4 in).
