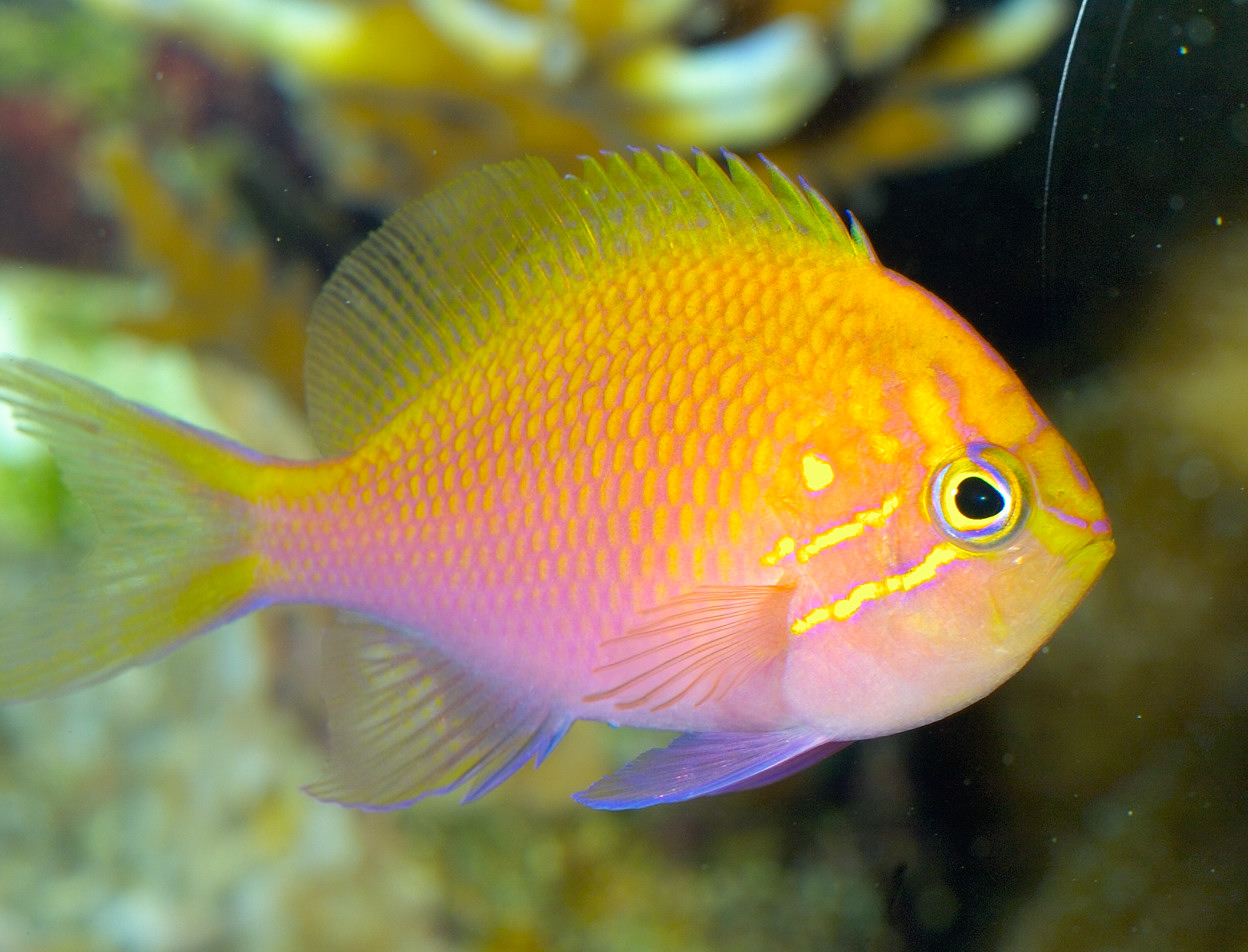

Conservation status
- Least Concern (IUCN 3.1)

Scientific classification
- Kingdom: Animalia
- Phylum: Chordata
- Class: Actinopterygii
- Order: Perciformes
- Family: Anthiadidae
- Genus: Serranocirrhitus; Watanabe, 1949
- Species: S. latus

Binomial name
- Serranocirrhitus latus Watanabe, 1949

Synonyms
- Dactylanthias mcmichaeli Whitley, 1962

= Hawkfish anthias =

Species of ray-finned fish

The hawkfish anthias (Serranocirrhitus latus), also known as the swallowtail basslet, coral perch, hawk anthias, fathead anthias, or sunburst anthias, is a species of marine ray-finned fish in the family Anthiadidae. It is the only member of the genus Serranocirrhitus. It is found in the Western Pacific Ocean. It is sometimes found in the aquarium trade.

== Description ==
The hawkfish anthias has a deep body, notably deeper than other members of the subfamily Anthiinase, and elongated pectoral fins that reach to the rear part of the anal fin. Overall it is pinkish in colour with each scale having a bright yellow to orange marking. There are two bright yellow stripes radiating from the back of the eye and a yellow spot on the operculum. The dorsal fin has 10 spines and 18–20 soft rays while the anal fin has 3 spines and 7 soft rays. The maximum total length attained is 13 centimetres (5.1 in).

== Distribution ==
The hawkfish anthias is distributed from southern Japan, where it occurs in the Ryukyu and Izu Islands, and Taiwan south to the Great Barrier Reef and Palau. It occurs as far west as the Moluccas and east to Tonga.

== Habitat and biology ==
The hawkfish anthias is found in inshore waters in the vicinity of coral reefs, small groups may occur near caves, overhangs and drop-offs, at depths of 10 to 70 metres (33 to 230 ft). It can be found singly or in small groups and tends to be a secretive species which frequently swims upside down under overhangs or cave ceilings. They are faithful to a specific shelter. Their diet consists mainly of zooplankton. Hawkfish anthias are protogynous hermaphrodites and when a male in a loose aggregation dies or dis appears the dominant female changes sex to become the male.

== Taxonomy ==
The hawkfish anthias was first formally described by Masao Watanbe in 1949 with the type locality given as Itoman, Okinawa, in the Ryukyus. Watanabe placed the new species in the monospecific genus Serranocirrhitus within the hawkfish family, Cirrhitidae. In 1962 the Australian ichthyologist Gilbert Percy Whitley described a new species which he also placed in a monospecific genus and named Dactylanthias mcmichaeli, although he placed this species in the grouper family Serranidae, as one of the anthias. Later John E. Randall and Phil Heemstra were able to show that S. latus and D. mcmichaeli were synonymous and that the species should be placed in the subfamily Anthiinea of the Serranidae. It is the only species in its genus.

== Utilisation ==
The hawkfish anthias is rare in the aquarium trade although it is highly sought after and some populations have declined due to harvesting for this trade.
