= Anatolanthias =

Scientific classification
- Kingdom: Animalia
- Phylum: Chordata
- Class: Actinopterygii
- Division: Teleostei
- Order: Perciformes
- Family: Anthiadidae
- Genus: Anatolanthias; Anderson, Parin & Randall, 1990
- Species: A. apiomycter

Binomial name
- Anatolanthias apiomycter Anderson, Parin & Randall, 1990

Genus of ray-finned fishes

Anatolanthias apiomycter is a species of reef fish found in the southeastern Pacific Ocean, along the Nazca Ridge. It is the only member of the genus Anatolanthias of the family Anthiadidae.
