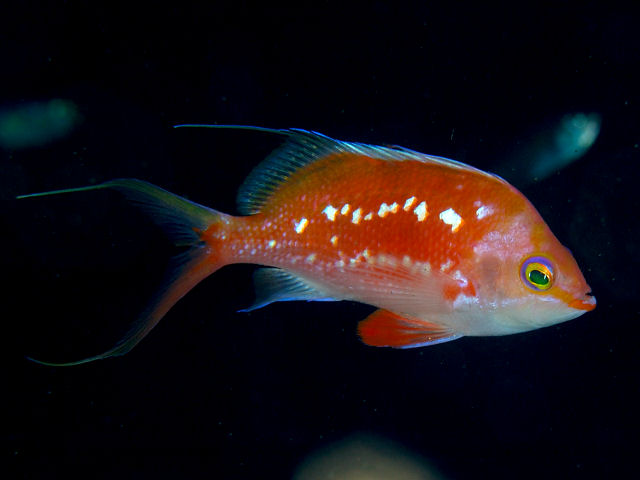
- Sacura margaritacea

Scientific classification
- Kingdom: Animalia
- Phylum: Chordata
- Class: Actinopterygii
- Order: Perciformes
- Family: Anthiadidae
- Genus: Sacura; D. S. Jordan & R. E. Richardson, 1910

Type species
- Anthias margaritaceus Hilgendorf, 1879

= Sacura =

Genus of ray-finned fishes

Sacura is a genus of ray-finned fish in the family Anthiadidae found in the Indian and Pacific Ocean.

== Species ==
There are currently 5 recognized species in this genus:

- Sacura boulengeri (Heemstra, 1973) (Boulenger's sacura)
- Sacura margaritacea (Hilgendorf, 1879) (Cherry anthias)
- Sacura parva Heemstra & J. E. Randall, 1979 (Little fairy basslet)
- Sacura sanguinea Motomura, Yoshida & Vilasri, 2017 (Andaman deep-water anthias)
- Sacura speciosa Heemstra & J. E. Randall, 1979 (Purple-head sacura)
