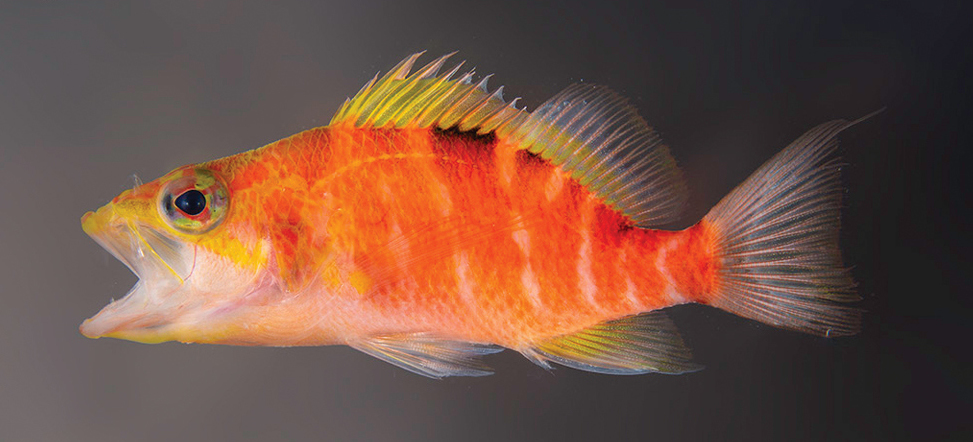
- Pelontrus hinano

Scientific classification
- Kingdom: Animalia
- Phylum: Chordata
- Class: Actinopterygii
- Order: Perciformes
- Family: Anthiadidae
- Genus: Pelontrus; J. L. B. Smith, 1961

Type species
- Pelontrus morgansi Smith, 1961

Synonyms
- Zacallanthias Katayama, 1964

= Pelontrus =

Genus of fishes

Pelontrus is a genus of ray-finned fish in the subfamily Anthiinae, part of the family Anthiadidae. They are found in the Western Indian Ocean, with the first being collected off the coast of Kenya. The genus Pelontrus has frequently been synonymized with Plectranthias, but recent multigene phylogenetic revisions have resurrected it as a distinct valid genus.

== Species ==
These are the currently recognized species in this genus:

- Pelontrus alcocki (Bineesh, Gopalakrishnan & Jena, 2014) (Alcock's perchlet)
- Pelontrus bennetti (G. R. Allen & F. M. Walsh, 2015) (Bennett's perchlet)
- Pelontrus ferrugineus (Gill, Pogonoski, Moore & Johnson, 2021)
- Pelontrus foresti (Fourmanoir, 1977)
- Pelontrus hinano (Shepherd, Phelps, Pinheiro, Rocha & Rocha, 2020) (Hinano perchlet)
- Pelontrus kojiorum (Koeda, Muto & Wada, 2021)
- Pelontrus maugei (J. E. Randall, 1980)
- Pelontrus megalepis (Günther, 1880)
- Pelontrus moretonensis (Gill, Pogonoski, Moore & Johnson, 2021)
- Pelontrus morgansi Smith, 1961 (Flag-fin perchlet)
- Pelontrus raki (Shepherd, Pinheiro, Najeeb, Rocha & Rocha, 2025)
- Pelontrus ryukyuensis (Wada, Suzuki, Senou & Motomura, 2020)
- Pelontrus sagamiensis (Katayama, 1964)
- Pelontrus takasei (A. C. Gill, Y. K. Tea & Senou, 2016) (Hinomaru perchlet)
- Pelontrus vexillarius (J. E. Randall, 1980)
