= Pelontrus morgansi =

Conservation status
- Data Deficient (IUCN 3.1)

Scientific classification
- Kingdom: Animalia
- Phylum: Chordata
- Class: Actinopterygii
- Order: Perciformes
- Family: Anthiadidae
- Genus: Pelontrus
- Species: P. morgansi

Binomial name
- Pelontrus morgansi J. L. B. Smith, 1961

Synonyms
- Plectranthias morgansi (Smith, 1961)

Species of fish

Pelontrus morgansi, the flagfin, is a species of fish in the family Serranidae occurring in the western Indian Ocean. It is the type species of its genus.

== Size ==
This species reaches a length of 5.0 cm (2.0 in).

== Etymology ==
The fish is named in honor of John Frederick Croil Morgans, a research assistant in the Zoology Department of the University of Cape Town in South Africa, who sent the type specimen to Smith.
