= Odontanthias borbonius =

Scientific classification
- Kingdom: Animalia
- Phylum: Chordata
- Class: Actinopterygii
- Order: Perciformes
- Family: Anthiadidae
- Genus: Odontanthias
- Species: O. borbonius

Binomial name
- Odontanthias borbonius Valenciennes, 1828

Species of ray-finned fish

Odontanthias borbonius, the checked swallowtail, is a species of marine ray-finned fish in the family Anthiadidae.
