= Odontanthias cauoh =

Scientific classification
- Kingdom: Animalia
- Phylum: Chordata
- Class: Actinopterygii
- Order: Perciformes
- Family: Anthiadidae
- Genus: Odontanthias
- Species: O. cauoh

Binomial name
- Odontanthias cauoh Carvalho-Filho, Macena & Nunes, 2016

Species of ray-finned fish

Odontanthias cauoh, the red jewelfish, is a species of marine ray-finned fish in the family Anthiadidae. It is found in the eastern Atlantic Ocean.

== Etymology ==
The fish is named after "Carolina", the popular name for this fish among Brazilian professional fishermen at St. Paul's Rocks in the eastern Atlantic, but it was shortened to the nickname Cauó because of the first author's elder daughter, Ana Carolina S. R. Carvalho, and pronounced kau-oh.
