= Rabaulichthys altipinnis =

Conservation status
- Least Concern (IUCN 3.1)

Scientific classification
- Kingdom: Animalia
- Phylum: Chordata
- Class: Actinopterygii
- Order: Perciformes
- Family: Anthiadidae
- Genus: Rabaulichthys
- Species: R. altipinnis

Binomial name
- Rabaulichthys altipinnis G. R. Allen, 1984

Species of ray-finned fish

Rabaulichthys altipinnis, the sailfin anthias, is a species of ray-finned fish within the family Anthiadidae. The species grows to a length of 6 centimetres (2.4 in), with 10 dorsal spines, 15 to 16 dorsal soft rays, 3 anal spines, and 6 to 7 anal soft rays. It is found in the western Pacific Ocean off of New Britain, Indonesia and Australia.

== Habitat and biology ==
Rabaulichthys altipinnis lives in reef environments at depths of 30 to 40 metres (100 to 130 ft) below sea level. It lives near coral rubble and steep coral slopes on the outer region of reefs. Groups are typically found with 3 to 8 individuals. The diet consists of brine shrimp, nauplii and mysis.

== Conservation ==
Rabaulichthys altipinnis has been classified as 'Least concern' by the IUCN Red List. No special conservation efforts have been made so far, and its range already overlaps with marine protected areas off of Bird's Head Peninsula.
