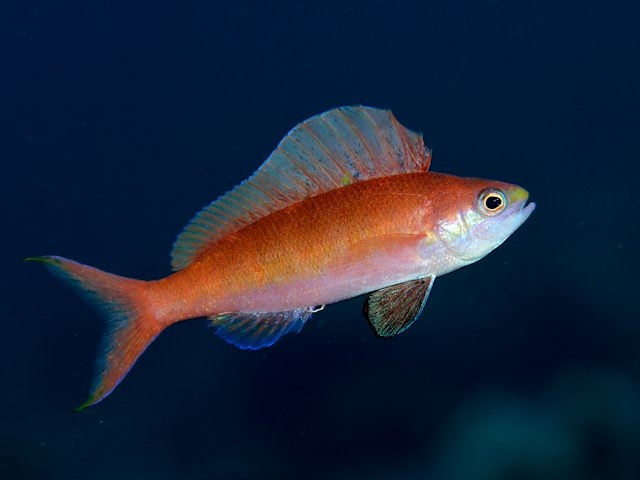
- Rabaulichthys suzukii

Scientific classification
- Domain: Eukaryota
- Kingdom: Animalia
- Phylum: Chordata
- Class: Actinopterygii
- Order: Perciformes
- Family: Anthiadidae
- Genus: Rabaulichthys; Allen, 1984

Type species
- Rabaulichthys altipinnis Allen, 1984

= Rabaulichthys =

Genus of ray-finned fish

Rabaulichthys is a genus of ray-finned fish in the family Anthiadidae with four species, ranging sizes from 6 to 6.4 cm long, all of which are found in areas including the Western Central Pacific, Western Pacific, Northwest Pacific, and Western Indian Ocean.

== Etymology ==
The genus is named after the town of Rabaul in New Britain, Papua New Guinea, which is best known as the site of a 1942 battle between Japanese and Allied forces in WW2.

== Species ==
- Rabaulichthys altipinnis Allen, 1984 (Sailfin anthias)
- Rabaulichthys squirei Randall & Walsh, 2010
- Rabaulichthys stigmaticus Randall & Pyle, 1989 (Spotfin anthias)
- Rabaulichthys suzukii Masuda & Randall, 2001
