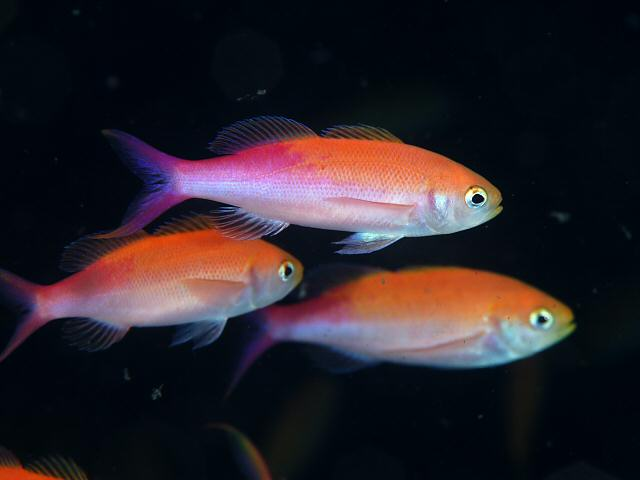

Conservation status
- Least Concern (IUCN 3.1)

Scientific classification
- Kingdom: Animalia
- Phylum: Chordata
- Class: Actinopterygii
- Order: Perciformes
- Family: Anthiadidae
- Genus: Luzonichthys
- Species: L. waitei

Binomial name
- Luzonichthys waitei (Fowler, 1931)

= Luzonichthys waitei =

Species of fish

Luzonichthys waitei, known as Waite's splitfin, is a species of marine ray-finned fish in the family Anthiadidae. It occurs in the Indo-Pacific from Aldabra and Astove of Seychelles to the Loyalty Islands, Fiji and Japan.
