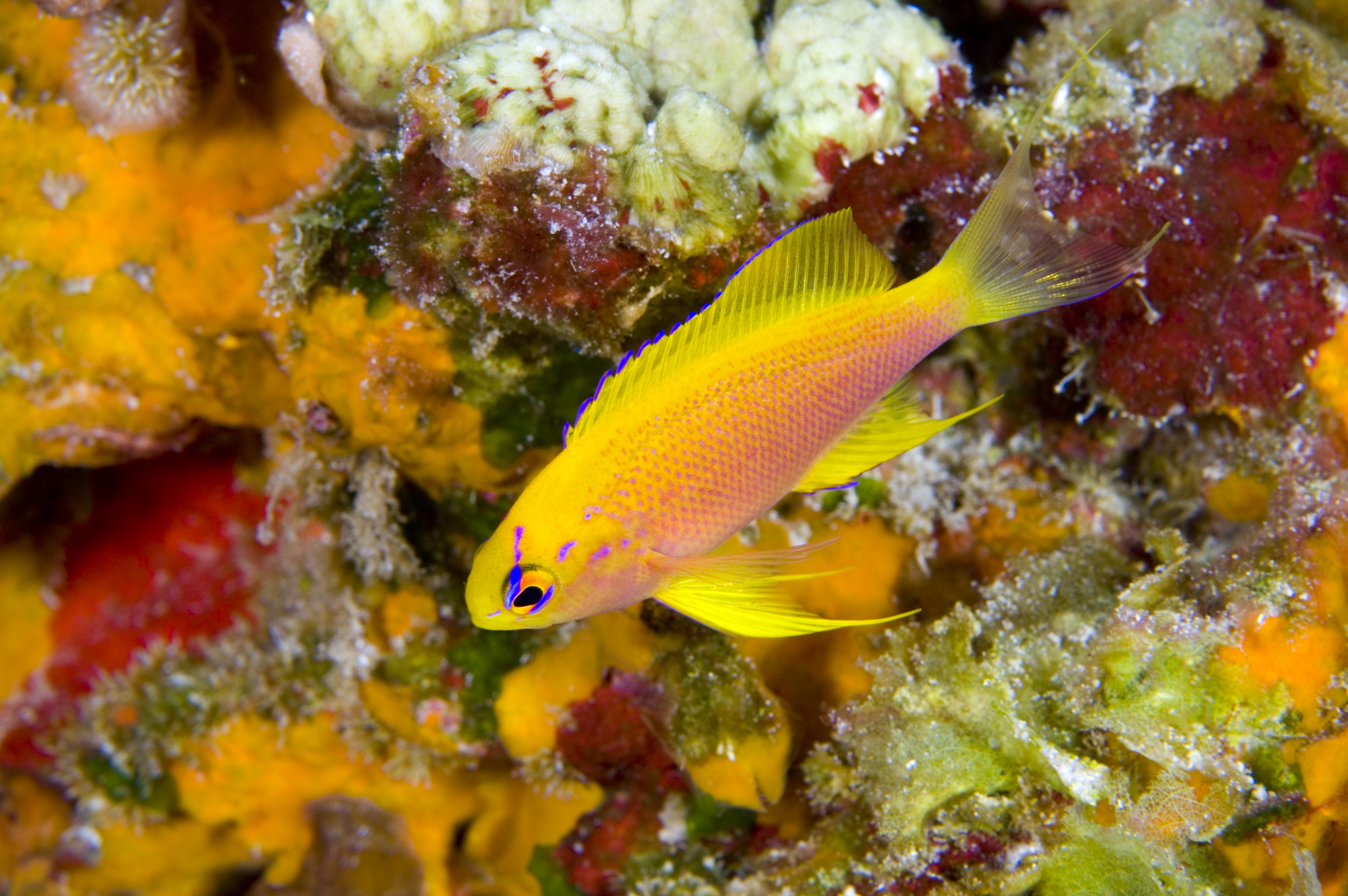

Conservation status
- Least Concern (IUCN 3.1)

Scientific classification
- Kingdom: Animalia
- Phylum: Chordata
- Class: Actinopterygii
- Order: Perciformes
- Family: Anthiadidae
- Genus: Pseudanthias
- Species: P. hawaiiensis

Binomial name
- Pseudanthias hawaiiensis (Randall, 1979)

= Pseudanthias hawaiiensis =

Species of fish

Pseudanthias hawaiiensis, the Hawaiian longfin anthias, is a small colorful species of fish in the subfamily Anthiinae. It is often treated as a subspecies of P. ventralis, but some authorities prefer to treat them as separate species. It is endemic to reefs at depths of 26–219 m (85–719 ft) in Hawaii and the Johnston Atoll.

== Description ==
It reaches 10 cm (3.9 in) in length and is bright yellow, orange, red and purple.The Hawaiian longfin Anthias are very small fish, that average between 1.5in - 2.5in. One characteristic that sticks out about them is their long pelvic and anal fins. This can be especially seen with the males. There is a difference in color between males and females. Males tend to be more multicolored with yellow, reddish, and lavender hues, while females are more yellow with more of a pink color towards the middle.

== Habitat and diet ==
This fish can be found swimming in depths between 80-230 ft. They don't tend to swim in open water, but instead stay near caves or on the side of cliffs. A unique trait about them is that you may find them swimming upside down while they are in caves or along reef ceilings. While they are by these slopes of coral, there would be a slight current and that is where they would eat. Their diet mainly consists of zooplankton. Since they live in deeper waters, the light quality is not that prominent and they can sometimes be found in groups of a dozen or more.

== Human use ==
It occasionally makes its way into the aquarium trade, but it is a difficult species to maintain. When they are in an aquarium, they can be quite shy if the tank is too bright. Living in deeper waters, the brightness will make them hesitant and they may tend to hide or not eat their food.
