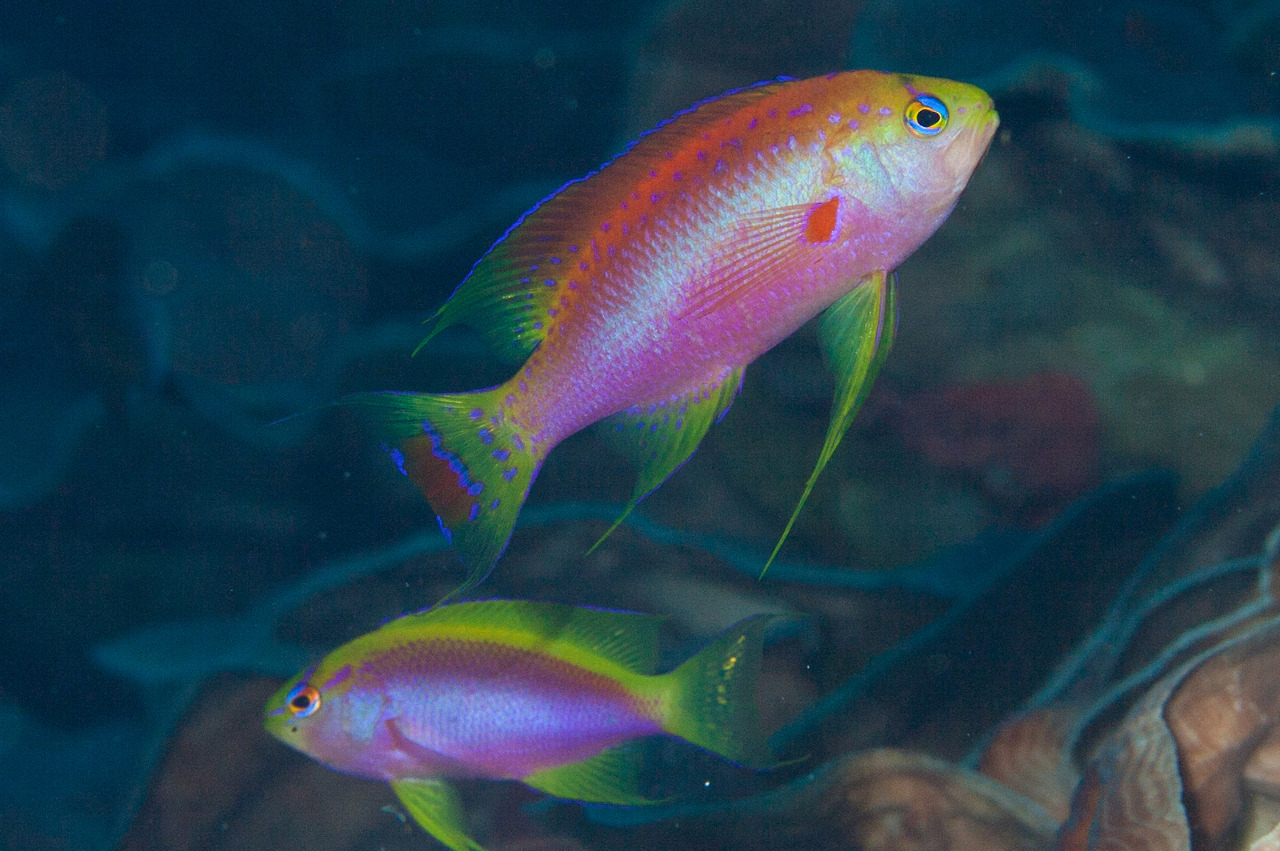

Conservation status
- Least Concern (IUCN 3.1)

Scientific classification
- Kingdom: Animalia
- Phylum: Chordata
- Class: Actinopterygii
- Order: Perciformes
- Family: Anthiadidae
- Genus: Pseudanthias
- Species: P. ventralis

Binomial name
- Pseudanthias ventralis (Randall, 1979)

Synonyms
- Anthias ventralis Randall, 1979

= Pseudanthias ventralis =

Species of fish

Pseudanthias ventralis, the longfin anthias or longfin basslet', is a species of marine ray-finned fish, an Pseudanthias from the subfamily Anthiinae part of the family Serranidae, the groupers and sea basses. It is found in the Western Pacific Ocean.

== Description ==
Pseudanthias ventralis has males which are metallic purple with a yellow head and a yellow tinge on the back just below the dorsal fin, although sometimes this is masked by heavy purple spotting. The populations from the southern quadrant of their range normally has distinct and circular purple spots in this part of the back. The dorsal fin is red on the spiny part and hyaline or yellowish on the soft-rayed part. The caudal fin is mostly clear and the only markings are two vertical purple lines. The anal fin is clear with an obvious purple line demarcating a are of deeper colouration which contains the anal fin spines and the first soft rays fin. The females are a similar metallic purple colour as the males, but do not have the dame markings. They do have a yellow dorsal fin, the colour just extending on to a small area of the back as far as the caudal peduncle. They also have a red arcing stripe which separates the yellow and purple on the back near the tail. Specimens from other geographical regions show differences in colouration to the above which represents the population from the type locality. The dorsal fin has 10 spines and 17 soft rays while the anal fin has 3 spines and 8 soft rays. This species attains a maximum total length of 7 centimetres (2.8 in).

== Distribution ==
Pseudanthias ventralis is found in the Western Pacific from southern Japan to the Marshall Islands, the Coral Sea, Vanuatu, New Caledonia and the Great Barrier Reef and in French Polynesia, Pitcairn Island and the Cook Islands.

== Habitat and biology ==
Pseudanthias ventralis is associated with coral reefs with a depth range of 26 to 120 metres (85 to 394 ft). It is a secretive species which is normally recorded from caves or beneath ledges but have also been reported over coral rubble along steep drop-offs or the sides of channels. They leave the shelter of caves and overhangs to feed on zooplankton such as copepods. It also feeds on larvae of crustaceans and fish eggs.

== Taxonomy ==
Pseudanthis ventralis was first formally described by John E. Randall as Anthias ventralis in 1979 with the type locality given as Gannet Ridge near Pitcairn Island. This species is placed in the subgenus Pseudanthias by some authorities This species and Pseudanthias hawaiiensis were formerly considered conspecific but P. hawaiiensis is now considered a valid species. The variation, especially in males, in different geographic populations of P.ventralis may warrant further investigation into their specific statuses.

== Utilisation ==
It occasionally makes its way into the aquarium trade, but it is a difficult species to maintain.
