= Meganthias carpenteri =

Conservation status
- Data Deficient (IUCN 3.1)

Scientific classification
- Kingdom: Animalia
- Phylum: Chordata
- Class: Actinopterygii
- Order: Perciformes
- Family: Anthiadidae
- Genus: Meganthias
- Species: M. carpenteri

Binomial name
- Meganthias carpenteri Anderson, 2006

Species of ray-finned fish

Meganthias carpenteri, the yellowtop jewelfish or Carpenter's yellowtop jewelfish, is a pink and yellow ray-finned fish found in the eastern Atlantic Ocean named after Old Dominion University marine biologist Kent E. Carpenter. It is a member of the family Anthiadidae.
