= Pelontrus megalepis =

Scientific classification
- Kingdom: Animalia
- Phylum: Chordata
- Class: Actinopterygii
- Order: Perciformes
- Family: Anthiadidae
- Genus: Pelontrus
- Species: P. megalepis

Binomial name
- Pelontrus megalepis (Günther, 1880)

Synonyms
- Anthias megalepis Günther, 1880; Plectranthias megalepis (Günther, 1880)

Species of fish

Pelontrus megalepis is a species of fish in the family Serranidae occurring in the western Pacific Ocean.

== Size ==
This species reaches a length of 6.2 cm (2.4 in).
