= Selenanthias =

Scientific classification
- Kingdom: Animalia
- Phylum: Chordata
- Class: Actinopterygii
- Order: Perciformes
- Family: Serranidae
- Genus: Selenanthias; Tanaka, 1918

Type species
- Selenanthias analis Tanaka, 1918

Genus of ray-finned fishes

Selenanthias is a genus of ray-finned fish in the family Anthiadidae native to the western and central Pacific Ocean.

== Species ==
The World Register of Marine Species currently recognizes three species in this genus:

- Selenanthias analis Tanaka, 1918 pearlspot fairy basslet
- Selenanthias barroi (Fourmanoir, 1982) Coral Sea fairy basslet
- Selenanthias myersi Randall, 1995
