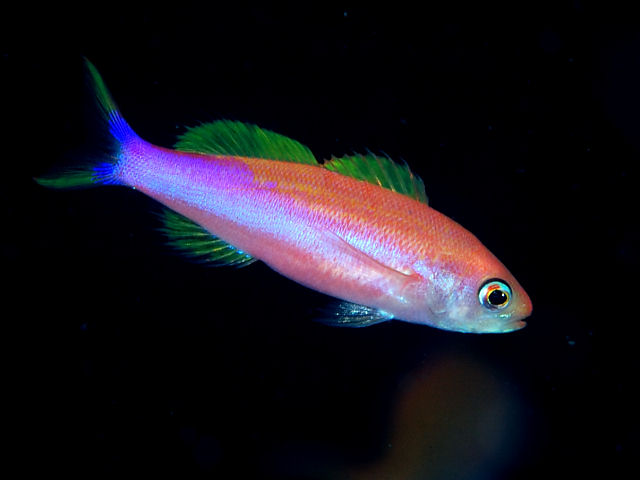
- Luzonichthys taeniatus

Scientific classification
- Kingdom: Animalia
- Phylum: Chordata
- Class: Actinopterygii
- Order: Perciformes
- Family: Anthiadidae
- Genus: Luzonichthys; Herre, 1936

= Luzonichthys =

Genus of ray-finned fishes

Luzonichthys is a genus of marine ray-finned fish in the family Anthiadidae.

== Species ==
There are currently 8 recognized species in this genus:

- Luzonichthys earlei J. E. Randall, 1981 (Earle's splitfin)
- Luzonichthys kiomeamea Shepherd, Pinheiro, Phelps, Perez-Matus & Rocha, 2019 (Easter Island splitfin)
- Luzonichthys microlepis (J. L. B. Smith, 1955) (Slender splitfin)
- Luzonichthys seaver Copus, Ka'apu-Lyons & Pyle, 2015 (Seaver splitfin)
- Luzonichthys taeniatus J. E. Randall & J. E. McCosker, 1992 (Striped splitfin)
- Luzonichthys waitei (Fowler, 1931) (Waite's splitfin)
- Luzonichthys whitleyi (J. L. B. Smith, 1955) (Whitley's splitfin)
- Luzonichthys williamsi J. E. Randall & J. E. McCosker, 1992

== Gallery ==
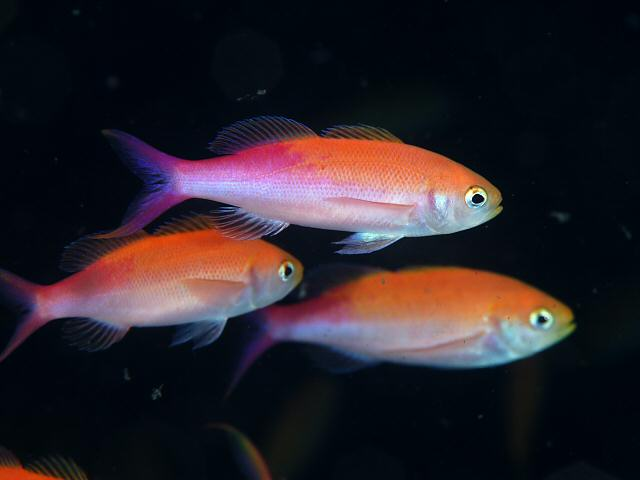
Luzonichthys waitei

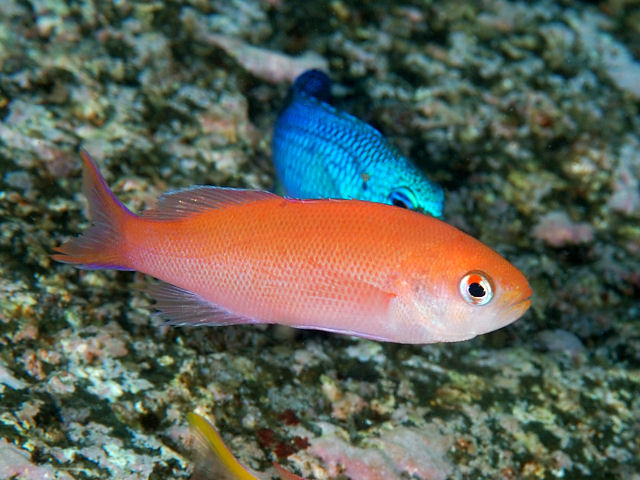
Luzonichthys waitei
