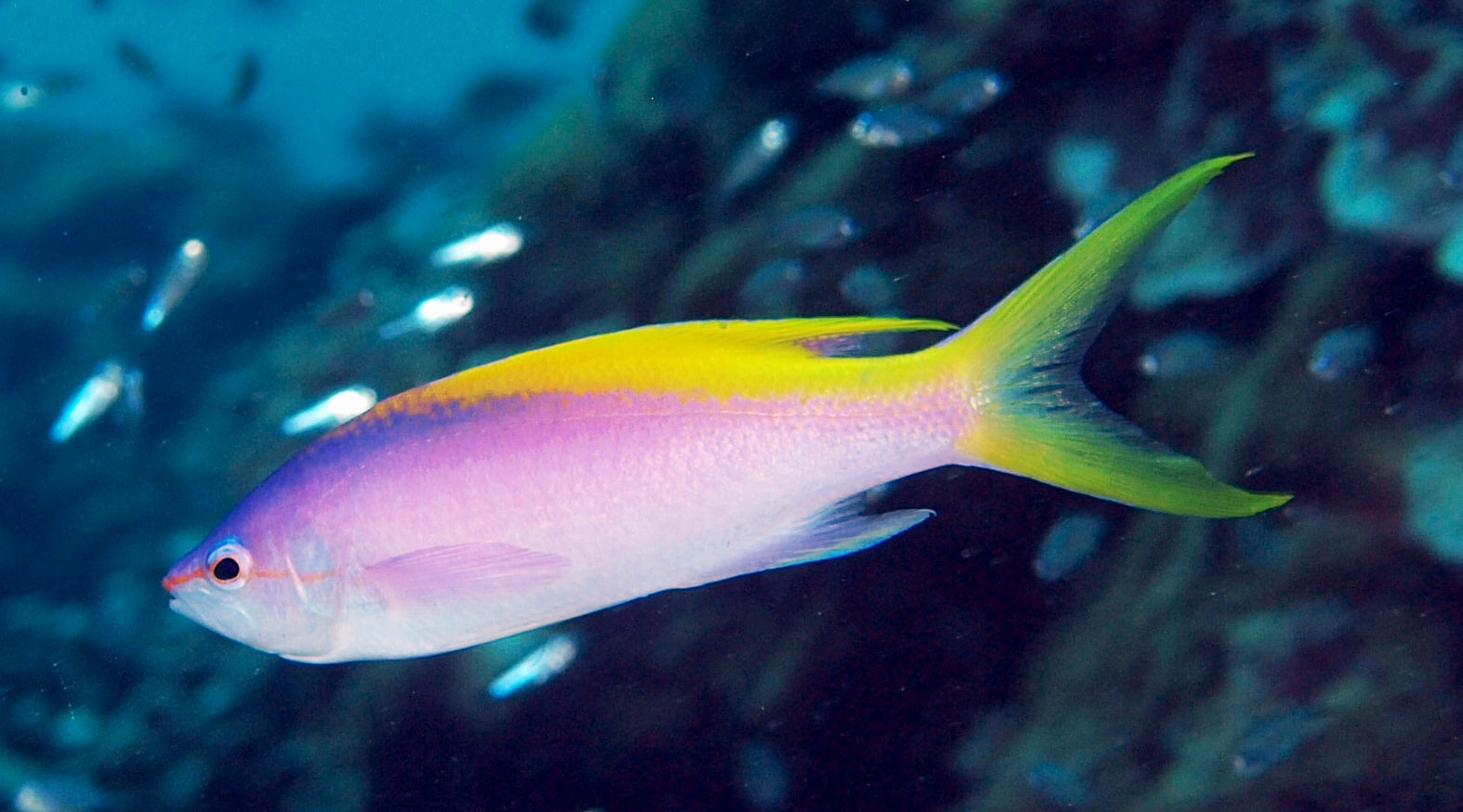

Conservation status
- Least Concern (IUCN 3.1)

Scientific classification
- Kingdom: Animalia
- Phylum: Chordata
- Class: Actinopterygii
- Division: Teleostei
- Order: Perciformes
- Family: Anthiadidae
- Genus: Mirolabrichthys
- Species: M. evansi

Binomial name
- Mirolabrichthys evansi (J. L. B. Smith, 1954)

Synonyms
- Anthias evansi J. L. B. Smith, 1954; Pseudanthias evansi (J. L. B. Smith, 1954)

= Mirolabrichthys evansi =

Species of fish

Mirolabrichthys evansi, the yellowback anthias, two-coloured coral perch, goldback anthia, yellow goldie, yellowtail basslet or yellowtail fairy basslet, is a species of marine ray-finned fish belonging to the family Anthiadidae, the anthias and fairy basslets. This fish is found to the Indian Ocean. It may be found in the aquarium trade.

== Taxonomy ==
Mirolabrichthys evansi was first formally described in 1954 as Anthias evansi by the South African ichthyologist James Leonard Brierley Smith with its type locality given as Shimoni in Kenya. This species is now classified in the genus Mirolabrichthys, along with two other species. This genus is classified within the family Anthiadidae, the anthias and fairy basslets, in the suborder Percoidei, the perch-like fishes, in order Perciformes.

== Etymology ==
Mirolabrichthys evansi is classified in the genus ''Mirolabrichthys, this name combines mirus, which means "wonderful", and labrum, meaning "lip", alluding to the “remarkable proboscislike, fleshy, pointed tip” on premaxillary of the type species, M. tuka, and suffixes it with -ichthys, the Greek for "fish". The specific name honours Frank V. Evans of Durban for the great assistance he gave to J.L.B. Smith's work.

== Description ==
Mirolabrichthys evansi reaches a standard length of 12 cm (4.7 in). It has an elongated body with a somewaht compressed cross section. The overall colour of this basslet is violet with the males possessing an orange band which runs through the eye, a wide yellow patch on the back, the dorsal fin and caudal fin with scattered yellow spots on the flanks. The females are pinkish ventrally with yellow dorsal and caudal fins, and a yellow area on the dorsal part of the head and body. The males also have a fleshy protuberance on the snout, elongated lobes on the caudal fin and filaments on the tips of the pelvic fins.

== Distribution and habitat ==
Mirolabrichthys evansi is found in the Indian Ocean from the eastern coast of Africa and Madagascar, the Seychelles, Mascarenes, the Chagos Islands and the Maldives east to the islands of the Andaman Sea and islands off western Sumatra, south to Christmas Island and the Cocos (Keeling) Islands. It is found in outer-reef lagoons and the upper parts of reef drop-offs.

== Biology ==
Mirolabrichthys evansi is a social species which is found in large groups. It feeds on zooplankton at various depths. It is a polygynous species where a single male will guard a harem of females.

== Utilisation ==
Mirolabrichthys evansi appears in the aquarium trade.
