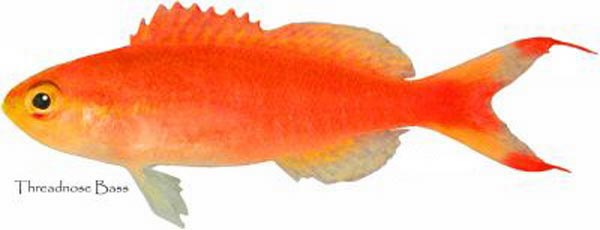

Conservation status
- Least Concern (IUCN 3.1)

Scientific classification
- Kingdom: Animalia
- Phylum: Chordata
- Class: Actinopterygii
- Order: Perciformes
- Family: Anthiadidae
- Genus: Choranthias
- Species: C. tenuis

Binomial name
- Choranthias tenuis (Nichols, 1920)

Synonyms
- Anthias tenuis Nichols, 1920

= Choranthias tenuis =

Species of ray-finned fish

Choranthias tenuis, the threadnose bass, is a species of ray-finned fish within the family Anthiadidae. Its distribution covers the western Atlantic near areas such as Bermuda, North Carolina, Florida, Texas, Georgia, South Carolina, Mississippi, Venezuela, Guyana, southeastern Gulf of Mexico, Yucatán, Puerto Rico, and the southern Caribbean, where it lives in subtropical waters over hard bottoms with large rocks that allow for micro habitats. The depths the species occurs is 55 to 915 metres (180 to 3,000 ft), however individuals are more commonly found at depths less than 150 metres (490 ft). It is commonly found at 8 centimetres (3.1 in) in length and a maximum of 9 centimetres (3.5 in). It feeds on plankton and swims in schools.

Choranthias tenuis has been assessed as a 'Least concern' species by the IUCN Red List as it has a large distribution with no known major threats. It does occasionally occur in the aquarium trade.
