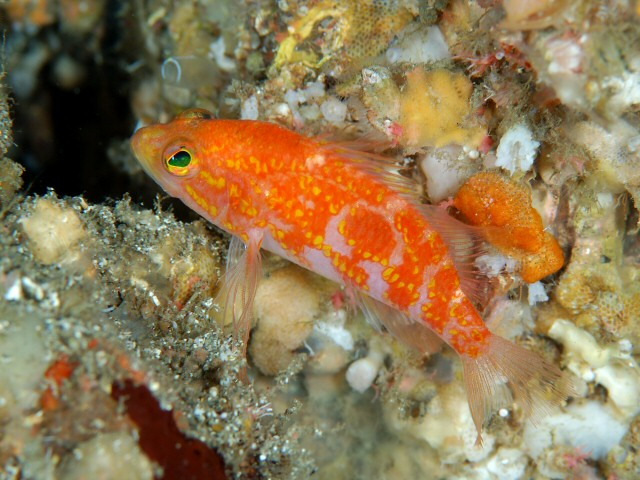

Scientific classification
- Kingdom: Animalia
- Phylum: Chordata
- Class: Actinopterygii
- Order: Perciformes
- Family: Anthiadidae
- Genus: Pelontrus
- Species: P. takasei

Binomial name
- Pelontrus takasei (A. C. Gill, Y. K. Tea & Senou, 2016)

Synonyms
- Plectranthias takasei Gill, Tea & Senou, 2016; Plectranthias normanby Fricke, 2021

= Pelontrus takasei =

Species of fish

Pelontrus takasei, the Hinomaru perchlet, is a species of fish in the family Serranidae.

== Description ==
This species reaches a standard length of 4.0 cm (1.6 in).

== Distribution and habitat ==
The fish is found in Japan.

== Etymology ==
The fish is named in honor of Wataru Takase, who collected the type specimen and provided underwater photographs of the fish.
