= Choranthias salmopunctatus =

Conservation status
- Least Concern (IUCN 3.1)

Scientific classification
- Kingdom: Animalia
- Phylum: Chordata
- Class: Actinopterygii
- Order: Perciformes
- Family: Anthiadidae
- Genus: Choranthias
- Species: C. salmopunctatus

Binomial name
- Choranthias salmopunctatus (Lubbock & A. J. Edwards, 1981)

Synonyms
- Anthias salmopunctatus (Lubbock & Edwards, 1981)

Species of ray-finned fish

Choranthias salmopunctatus, the salmon-spotted jewelfish, is a species of marine ray-finned fish in the family Anthiadidae. It is endemic to Brazil where a small population has been spotted near St. Peter and St. Paul's archipelago. Upon resurfacing after a 30-year disappearance, this population can now be found aggregating in relatively small groups.
