= Aepysomanthias =

Conservation status
- Least Concern (IUCN 3.1)

Scientific classification
- Kingdom: Animalia
- Phylum: Chordata
- Class: Actinopterygii
- Order: Perciformes
- Family: Anthiadidae
- Genus: Aepysomanthias; Tang & Chen, 2025
- Species: A. randalli

Binomial name
- Aepysomanthias randalli (Fourmanoir & Rivaton, 1980)

Synonyms
- Plectranthias randalli

Species of fish

Aepysomanthias is monotypic genus of fish in the family Anthiadidae occurring in the western Pacific Ocean. Its only species is Aepysomanthias randalli, the emperor perchlet.

== Size ==
This species reaches a length of 11.1 cm (4.4 in).

== Etymology ==
The fish is named in honor of ichthyologist John E. Randall (1924-2020), of the Bishop Museum in Honolulu, whose revision of the genus was cited by the authors.
