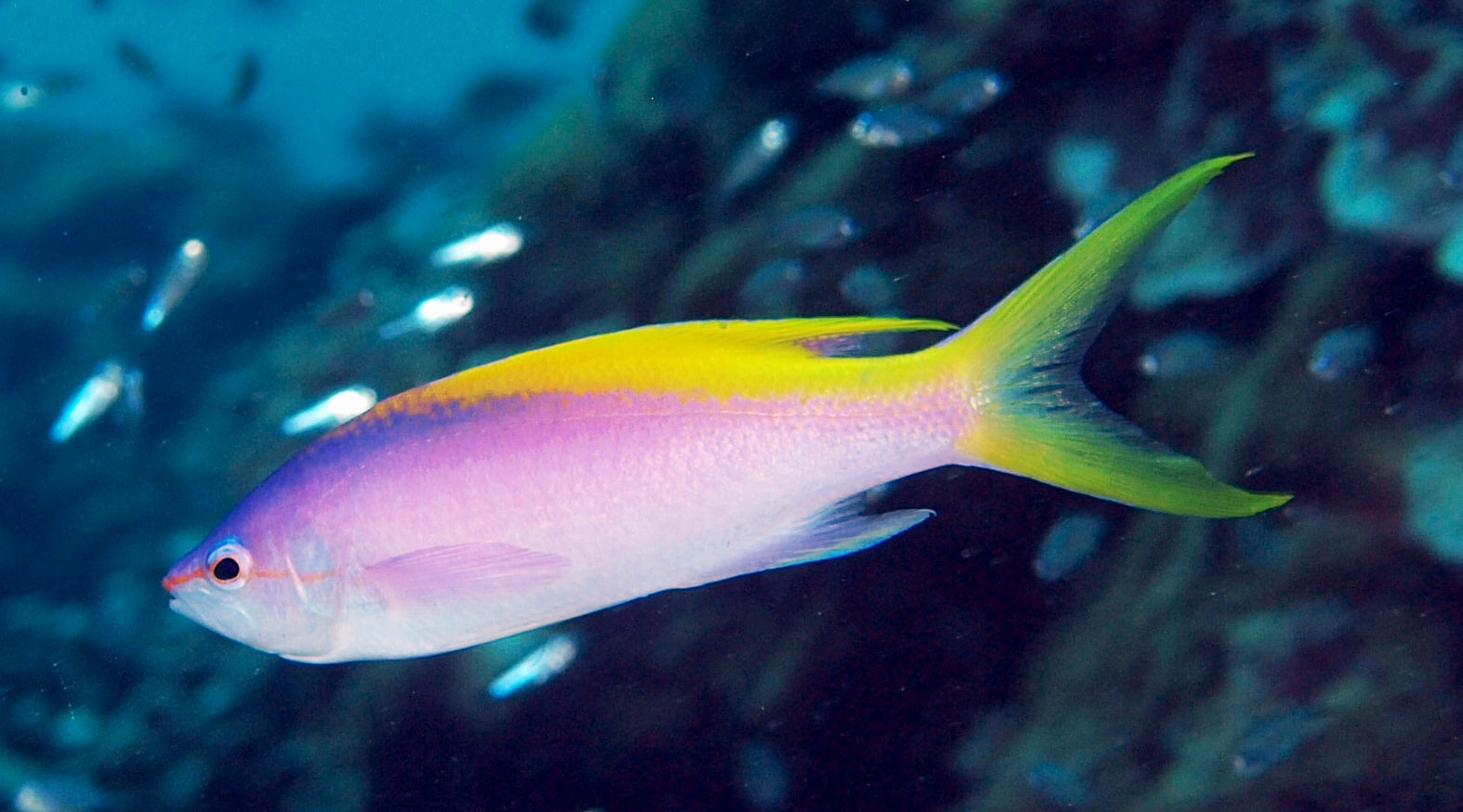
- Mirolabrichthys evansi

Scientific classification
- Kingdom: Animalia
- Phylum: Chordata
- Class: Actinopterygii
- Order: Perciformes
- Family: Anthiadidae
- Genus: Mirolabrichthys; Herre, 1927

Type species
- Mirolabrichthys tuka Herre & Montalban, 1927

= Mirolabrichthys =

Genus of fishes

Mirolabrichthys is a genus of colorful reef fishes in the family Anthiadidae, which was previously treated as a subfamily of the family Serranidae, the groupers and sea basses. It is found in the Indo-Pacific.

== Species ==
These are the three currently recognized species in this genus:

Species	Common name	Image
Mirolabrichthys evansi (J. L. B. Smith, 1954)	yellowback anthias	
Mirolabrichthys pascalus (D. S. Jordan & S. Tanaka (I), 1927)	amethyst anthias	
Mirolabrichthys tuka Herre & H. R. Montalban, 1927	yellowstriped fairy basslet	
