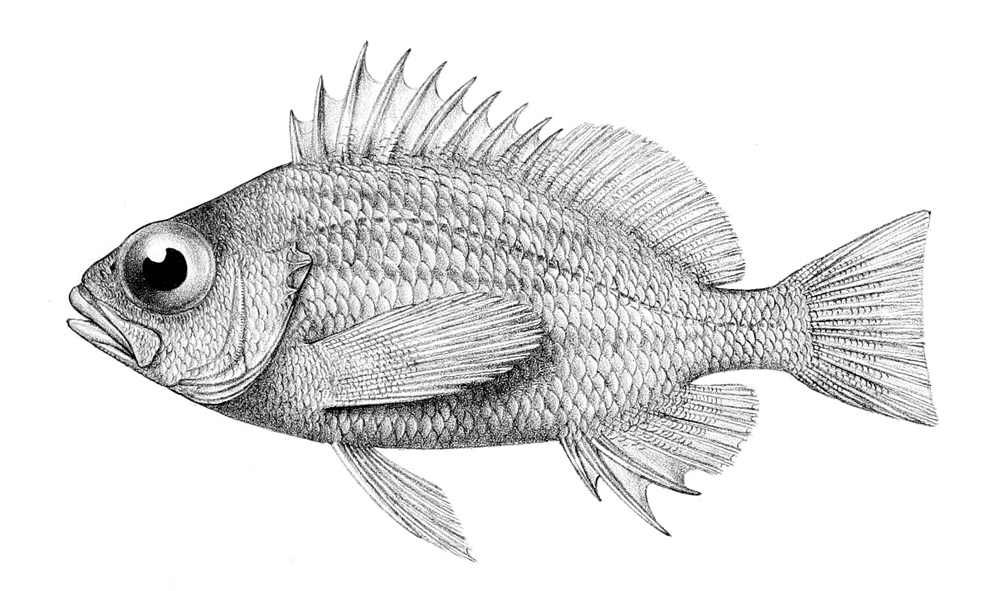
- Lepidoperca inornata
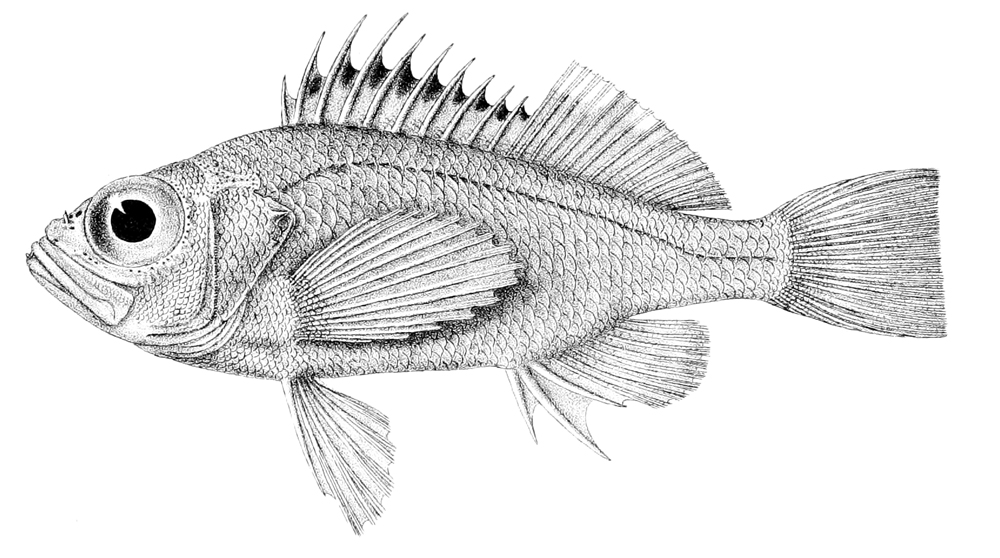
- Lepidoperca coatsii

Scientific classification
- Kingdom: Animalia
- Phylum: Chordata
- Class: Actinopterygii
- Order: Perciformes
- Family: Anthiadidae
- Genus: Lepidoperca; Regan, 1914

Type species
- Lepidoperca inornata Regan, 1914

Species
- See text

= Lepidoperca =

Genus of ray-finned fishes

Lepidoperca is a small genus of ray-finned fish belonging to the family Anthiadidae. It includes ten species.

== Taxonomy ==
Lepidoperca was first established by the British ichthyologist Charles Tate Regan in 1914.

== Description ==
Members of Lepidoperca have moderately compressed oblong or ovate bodies. They have large eyes, with diameters longer than the distance between both eyes. The dorsal fin has ten spines and 15 to 17 soft rays. The margin has a slight notch just before it transitions into the soft-rayed portion. The anal fin has three spines and 7 to 9 soft rays. The pectoral fins have 15 to 17 soft rays, with all the rays branched except for the uppermost two. The caudal fin is truncate to lunate in shape with 15 soft rays. Both the upper and lower jaws have a pair of forward-facing canines. Vomerine teeth exist in a V-shaped patch. The tongue is smooth. The scales are large and ctenoid.

Lepidoperca is closely related to the genus Caesioperca, but differ from the latter in the smaller number of rays from the dorsal and anal fins, larger eyes, and their V-shaped vomerine teeth patch (in contrast to the pentagon-shaped patch of Caesioperca).

== Species ==
The following species are classified under Lepidoperca:

- Lepidoperca aurantia Roberts, 1989 - New Zealand orange perch
- Lepidoperca brochata Katayama & Fujii, 1982 - Fangtooth perch
- Lepidoperca caesiopercula (Whitley, 1951) - Graycheek basslet
- Lepidoperca coatsii (Regan, 1913)
- Lepidoperca filamenta Roberts, 1987 - Western orange perch
- Lepidoperca inornata Regan, 1914
- Lepidoperca magna Katayama & Fujii, 1982 - Sharphead perch
- Lepidoperca occidentalis Whitley, 1951 - Slender orange perch
- Lepidoperca pulchella (Waite, 1899) - Eastern orange perch
- Lepidoperca tasmanica Norman, 1937 - Tasmanian perch
