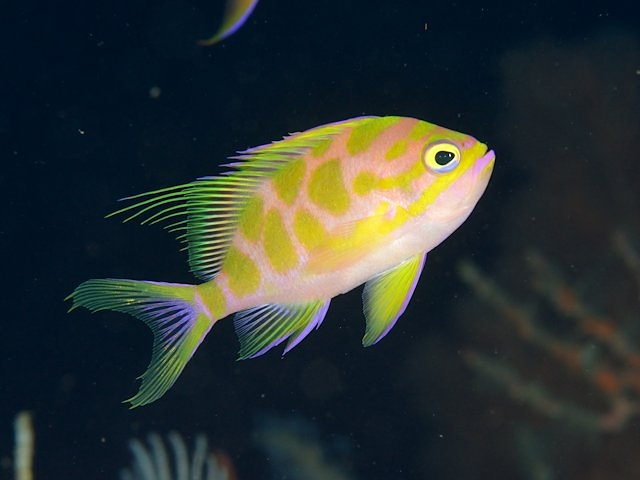
- Odontanthias borbonius

Scientific classification
- Kingdom: Animalia
- Phylum: Chordata
- Class: Actinopterygii
- Order: Perciformes
- Family: Anthiadidae
- Genus: Odontanthias; Bleeker, 1873

Type species
- Serranus borbonius Valenciennes, 1828

= Odontanthias =

Genus of ray-finned fishes

Odontanthias is a genus of marine ray-finned fish in the family Anthiadidae. Depending on the exact species, they reach up to 10–22 cm (3.9–8.7 in) in standard length, and are brightly marked with pink and yellow. They are found at rocky reefs in deep water, mainly below 100 m (330 ft). The genus is almost entirely restricted to the Indo-Pacific; O. cauoh of the Saint Peter and Saint Paul Archipelago and O. hensleyi of the Caribbean are the only species known from outside the Indo-Pacific and evidence indicates that the latter belongs in Anthias.

== Species ==
There are currently 16 recognized species in this genus:

- Odontanthias borbonius (Valenciennes, 1828) (Checked swallowtail)
- Odontanthias caudicinctus (Heemstra & J. E. Randall, 1986)
- Odontanthias cauoh Carvalho-Filho, Macena & Nunes, 2016 (Red jewelfish)
- Odontanthias chrysostictus (Günther, 1872)
- Odontanthias dorsomaculatus M. Katayama & Yamamoto, 1986
- Odontanthias elizabethae Fowler, 1923
- Odontanthias flagris Yoshino & Araga, 1975
- Odontanthias fuscipinnis (O. P. Jenkins, 1901) (Hawaiian jewelfish)
- Odontanthias grahami J. E. Randall & Heemstra, 2006 (Graham's swallowtail)
- Odontanthias hensleyi W. D. Anderson & García-Moliner, 2012
- Odontanthias katayamai (J. E. Randall, Maugé & Plessis, 1979)
- Odontanthias randalli W. T. White, 2011 (Lombok swallowtail)
- Odontanthias rhodopeplus (Günther, 1872)
- Odontanthias tapui (J. E. Randall, Maugé & Plessis, 1979)
- Odontanthias unimaculatus (S. Tanaka (I), 1917)
- Odontanthias wassi J. E. Randall & Heemstra, 2006
