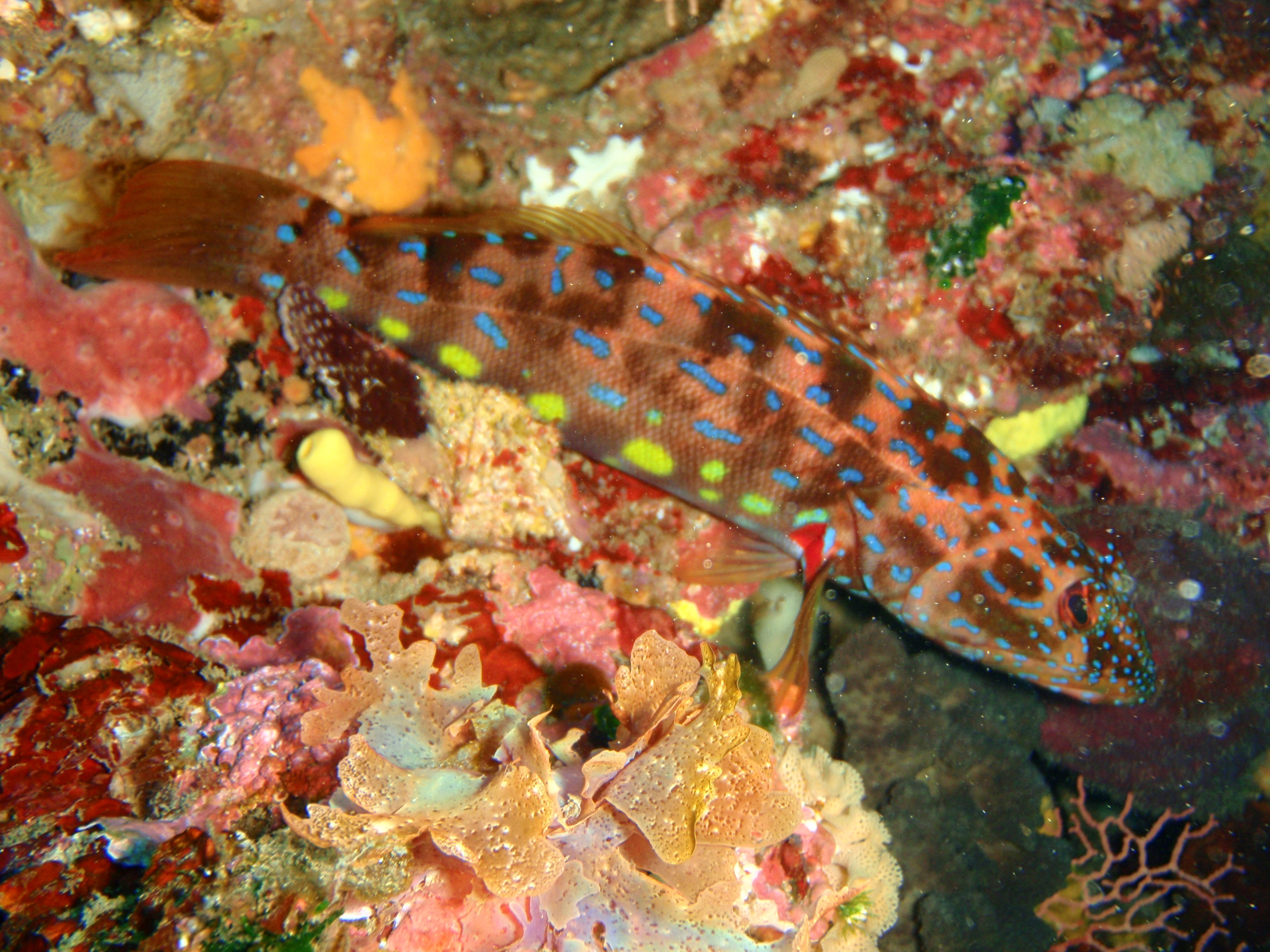

Conservation status
- Least Concern (IUCN 3.1)

Scientific classification
- Kingdom: Animalia
- Phylum: Chordata
- Class: Actinopterygii
- Division: Teleostei
- Order: Perciformes
- Family: Anthiadidae
- Genus: Othos; Castelnau, 1875
- Species: O. dentex

Binomial name
- Othos dentex (Cuvier, 1828)

Synonyms
- Plectropoma dentex Cuvier, 1828; Plectropoma richardsonii Günther, 1862; Othos cephalotes Castelnau, 1875

= Harlequin fish =

Species of ray-finned fish

The harlequin fish (Othos dentex) is a species of marine ray-finned fish in the family Anthiadidae. It is the only member of the genus Othos. It is also known commonly as the Chinese lantern, harlequin cod, harlequin rock cod and tiger cod. This species is found in the Eastern Indian Ocean and is endemic to Australian waters, in subtropical areas typically rocky reefs.

== Description ==
The harlequin fish is a diurnal forager that has a long life-cycle, a small home range and strong site fidelity. It is likely to be harmed by localized anthropogenic changes and by recreational fishing, though their fishing along the coast is low.

== Anatomy ==
=== Physical appearance ===
Harlequin fish vary greatly in size but reach a maximum length of 75–86 cm (30–34 in) and weight of 6 kg (13 lb). It has a heterogeneous color pattern that varies from individual to individual, which blends with the colors and surrounding coralline algae and encrusting sponges in the reef, providing a camouflage for them. The color variation, between individuals, is due to the large blotches which range from yellow to green that are located posterior to the pectoral fin on the lower half of the body. While all individuals have longitudinal blue flecks on the dorsal surface of the body, as males become mature these flecks become more prominent, and their spots change from yellow to green and finally, once they reach full maturity, to blue.

During spawning season, the color of blotches in males intensify, peaking at intensity during the midpoint of the season, which plays a role in courtship. This color change also suggests a change in their androgen levels. O. dentex has independently movable eyes that protrude on top of its head, and a large sized mouth.

=== Mouth and dentition ===
The anterior upper jaw of O. dentex contain two pairs of closely apposed big, recurved and pointed canines. Numerous, inwardly directed, very small pointed teeth extend backwards, in rows and declining in size, from the large canines on the margins of both sides of the upper jaw. Two large recurved and elongated canines sit anteriorly in the lower jaw, on either side, and three teeth, similar in shape, are further back. Their gill rakers have backwards-pointing spines.

== Life cycle ==
Harlequin fish can live up 42 years, and can grow a maximum length of 75 cm (30 in). In the otoliths of O. dentex, a single opaque zone forms annually, and age of the individual can be determined by the number of these zones. Considering their long life at the young age of 4-5, both the females and males, grow rapidly, with the males showing slight change in color as they reach maturity. Before maturing, the early juveniles are thought to be residing in the crannies and deeper in the caves, which would protect them against predatory piscivorous fish species that exist nearby. As the juvenile individuals approach their mature size, they start moving around the reef. Typically, the male individuals are solitary, and come together with females during spawning season.

=== Sexual reproduction ===
The harlequin fish is gonochoristic, it has indeterminate fecundity. This species also exhibits batch spawning which corresponds with the individuals being widely dispersed and scarce. It's unknown whether juveniles present bisexuality early in life, but if bisexuality is present, it's assumed that, some time before the individual reaches maturity, it disappears early in gonadal development. O. dentex have small testes, which implies low sperm competition. The spawning season for O. dentex is through September to March, and it peaks during the period between November and January. Indeterminate fecundity over the long life span as well as its long-lasting spawning period play a key role in egg and larval survival. These factors guarantee that of the numerous eggs that were produced during the spawning season majority of them will be released at a time that's favorable for the egg and larvae.

== Ecology ==
=== Distribution and habitat ===
The harlequin fish is native to the temperate waters, and is found over the shallow rocky reefs and in caves located in the cool coast of South-Western Australian waters. It's believed that this reef-dwelling species has an important place in the ecology of its environment since it is a top predator, and is relatively common in the area.

=== Diet ===
The harlequin fish is a demersal piscivore, and feeds during daylight. Its mature individuals feed exclusively on fish, and their prey, which is selected for on the basis of their size rather than species, and include species of teleosts, like the Labridae and the Pempheridae. Because juveniles would be unable to ingest prey as large as fishes, its assumed that they feed on other species besides teleosts. It feeds intermittently and its dietary composition lacks seasonality. When this diurnally active species is looking for food, it usually will lie over hard structures and wait for a prey, and when the prey is within range it will dart forward to attack its prey. Its physical appearance as well as the anatomy of its protruding eyes help with its foraging success.
