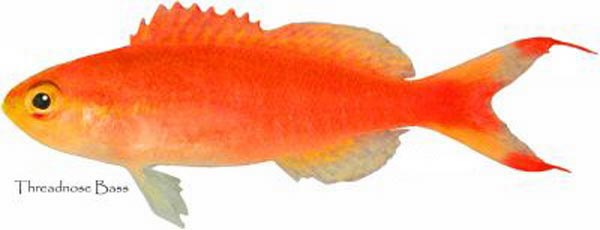
- Choranthias tenuis

Scientific classification
- Kingdom: Animalia
- Phylum: Chordata
- Class: Actinopterygii
- Order: Perciformes
- Family: Anthiadidae
- Genus: Choranthias; Anderson & Heemstra, 2012

Type species
- Anthias tenuis Nichols, 1920

= Choranthias =

Genus of ray-finned fishes

Choranthias is a genus of marine ray-finned fish from the family Anthiadidae. The genus was erected in 2012 and the name is a compound of the Greek chora meaning "room" or "space" and anthias meaning a "seafish", a reference to the broken lateral line of this genus compared to the other genera in the family.

== Species ==
There are two species classified within the genus Choranthias:

- Choranthias salmopunctatus (Lubbock & A.J. Edwards, 1981) (Salmon-spotted jewelfish)
- Choranthias tenuis (Nichols, 1902) (Threadnose bass)
