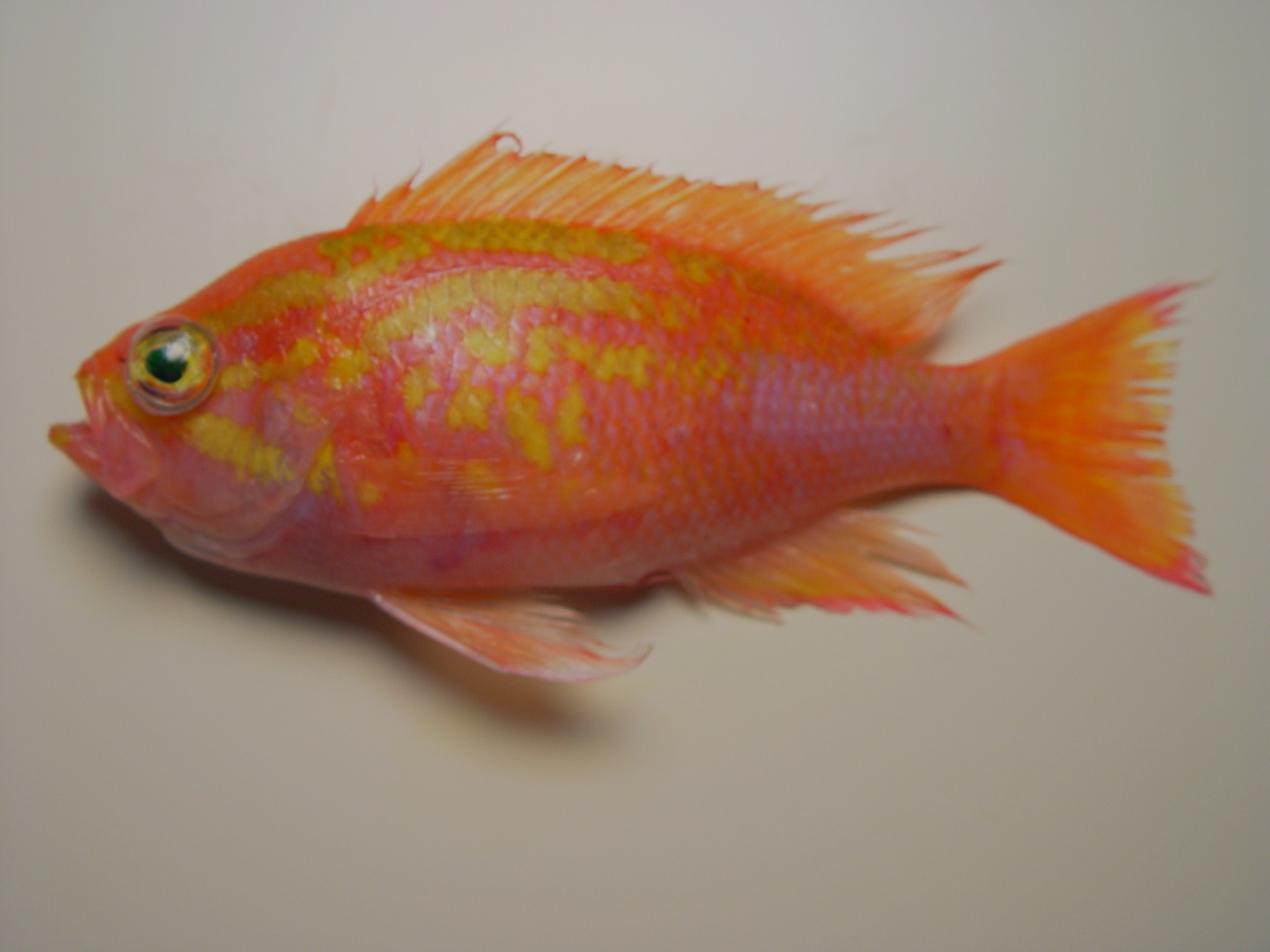
- Pronotogrammus martinicensis

Scientific classification
- Kingdom: Animalia
- Phylum: Chordata
- Class: Actinopterygii
- Order: Perciformes
- Family: Anthiadidae
- Genus: Pronotogrammus; Gill, 1863

Type species
- Pronotogrammus multifasciatus Gill, 1863

Species
- 3, see text

= Pronotogrammus =

Genus of ray-finned fishes

Pronotogrammus is a genus of colourful marine ray-finned fishes in the family Anthiadidae. They are found at reefs at depths of 40–325 m (131–1,066 ft) in the tropical and subtropical East Pacific and West Atlantic.

They are red, pink, and yellow, and reach 18–26 cm (7.1–10.2 in) in length depending on the species involved.

== Species ==
Based on FishBase, the following species are included in Pronotogrammus:

- Pronotogrammus eos Gilbert, 1890 (Bigeye bass)– East Pacific
- Pronotogrammus martinicensis ((Guichenot, 1868) (Roughtongue bass) – West Atlantic
- Pronotogrammus multifasciatus Gill, 1863 (Threadfin bass) – East Pacific

Fishbase notes that P. eos is classified in the genus Baldwinella by some authorities.
