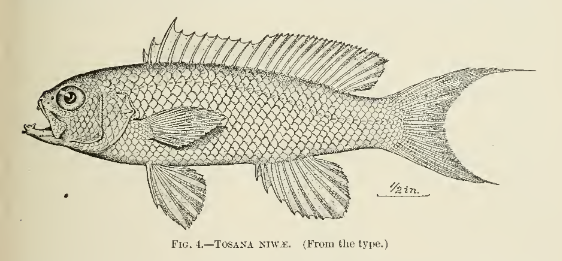

Scientific classification
- Kingdom: Animalia
- Phylum: Chordata
- Class: Actinopterygii
- Order: Perciformes
- Family: Anthiadidae
- Genus: Tosana; H. M. Smith & Pope, 1906
- Species: T. niwae

Binomial name
- Tosana niwae H. M. Smith & Pope, 1906

= Threadtail anthias =

Species of ray-finned fish

The threadtail anthias (Tosana niwae) is a species of marine ray-finned fish in the family Anthiadidae. It is the only member of the genus Tosana. It is found in the Western Pacific Ocean from Japan to the South China Sea in deep coastal waters over sandy-muddy substrates.
