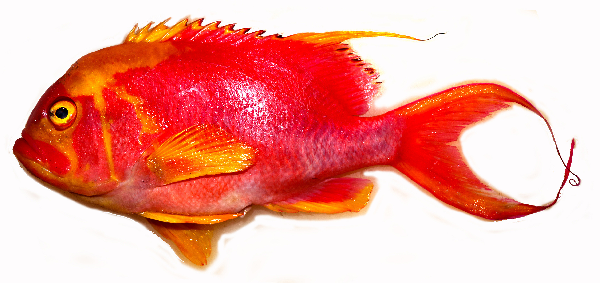
- Meganthias filiferus

Scientific classification
- Kingdom: Animalia
- Phylum: Chordata
- Class: Actinopterygii
- Order: Perciformes
- Family: Anthiadidae
- Genus: Meganthias; Randall & Heemstra, 2006

Type species
- Sacura natalensis Fowler, 1925

Species
- see text

= Meganthias =

Genus of ray-finned fishes

Meganthias is a genus of marine ray-finned fish from the family Anthiadidae. They are found in the Indo-Pacific region and the eastern Atlantic Ocean.

== Species ==
The following four species are classified within the genus Meganthias:

- Meganthias carpenteri Anderson, 2006 (Yellowtop jewelfish)
- Meganthias filiferus Randall & Heemstra, 2008 (Filamentous anthiine)
- Meganthias kingyo (Kon, Yoshino & Sakurai, 2000) (Japanese anthiine or Giant anthias)
- Meganthias natalensis (Fowler, 1925) (Gorgeous swallowtail)
