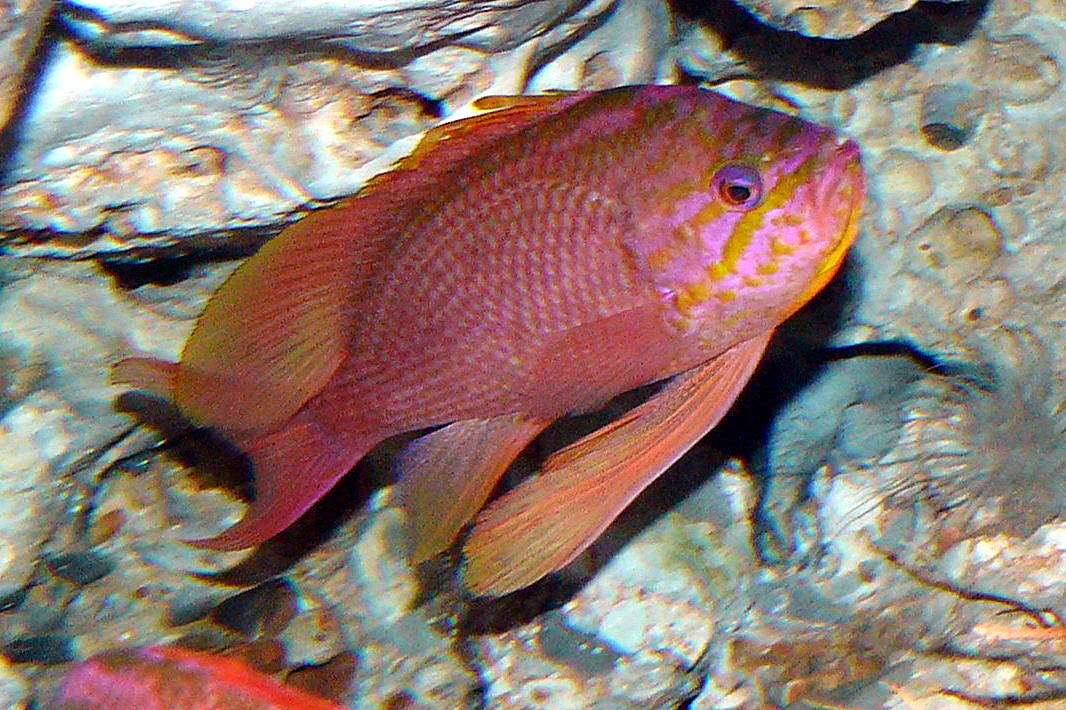

Conservation status
- Least Concern (IUCN 3.1)

Scientific classification
- Kingdom: Animalia
- Phylum: Chordata
- Class: Actinopterygii
- Division: Teleostei
- Order: Perciformes
- Family: Anthiadidae
- Genus: Anthias
- Species: A. anthias

Binomial name
- Anthias anthias (Linnaeus, 1758)
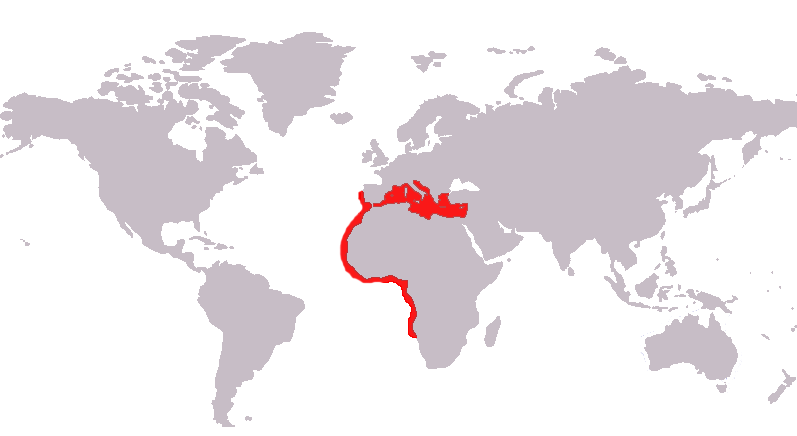
- Range of Anthias anthias

Synonyms
- Labrus anthias Linnaeus, 1758; Serranus anthias (Linnaeus, 1758); Anthias sacer Bloch, 1792; Aylopon canariensis Guichenot, 1868

= Anthias anthias =

Species of ray-finned fish

Anthias anthias, the swallowtail sea perch or marine goldfish, is a species of marine ray-finned fish from the family Anthiadidae. It is native to the eastern Atlantic Ocean and the Mediterranean Sea where it is associated with reefs. It is found in the aquarium trade.

== Description ==
Anthias anthias has a rather deep body which has a standard length which is equivalent to 2.5 times its depth. The dorsal fin has 10 spines, with the third spine being especially long, and 15 soft rays. The anal fin has three spines and seven soft rays. The pectoral fins are longer than the pelvic fins. The caudal fin has asymmetrical, pointed lobes with lower lobe being longer than the upper lobe. It has a complete lateral line which has 36–39 scales, the scales are large. Their colour varies from pink through to red and they have three yellow lines on the sides of their heads. Frequently they can show brown blotches along the back. The pelvic fins are yellow in colour but when breeding those of the males turn red. They can attain a standard length of 27 centimetres (11 in) but they are more normally around 12–18 centimetres (4.7–7.1 in).

== Distribution ==
Anthias anthias is found in the eastern Atlantic Ocean and Mediterranean Sea. In the Eastern Atlantic it occurs from Portugal south to Angola and northern Namibia. It also occurs around the Azores, Madeira, Canary Islands and Cape Verde Islands and the islands in the Gulf of Guinea. It is widespread in the Mediterranean and has been recorded in the Canakkale Strait off Gallipoli but not in the Black Sea.

== Habitat and biology ==
Anthias anthias occurs from 15 to 200 metres (49 to 656 ft) in depth and lives among rocks and corals, hiding in caves during the day. It emerges at night to feed on zooplankton, small crustacea and smaller fishes. This species is a protogynous hermaphrodite, all individuals hatch as females. Each time a male dies, one of the larger females changes her sex and becomes male. The majority are female throughout their lives and even a large school of these fish will contain only a few males. It takes around two weeks for the female to change sex and this involves not just a change in the gonads but also in colour, size and shape. If there are too many males in a social group then some of the males can reverse the sex change and revert to being females. They have been observed to co-operatively feed, some fish feed while others herd the prey, such as shrimp, the roles being reversed to allow all the fish to feed.

== Species description and taxonomy ==
Anthias anthias was first formally described in 1758 as Labrus anthius by Carolus Linnaeus in Volume 1 of the Xth edition of the Systema Naturae with the type locality given as southern Europe. When Marcus Elieser Bloch created the genus Anthias he used Anthias sacer as the type species but this is regarded as a synonym of Linnaeus's Labrus anthias, so this species is the type species of its genus. The name anthias is Greek for a fish, probably the gilt-head bream.

== Utilisation ==
Anthias anthias is used in the marine aquarium trade.
