= Dactylanthias =

Scientific classification
- Kingdom: Animalia
- Phylum: Chordata
- Class: Actinopterygii
- Order: Perciformes
- Family: Anthiadidae
- Genus: Dactylanthias; Bleeker, 1871

Type species
- Anthias aplodactylus Bleeker, 1858

Species
- See text

Genus of ray-finned fishes

Dactylanthias is a small genus of ray-finned fish belonging to the family Anthiadidae. It includes only two species from Ambon Island, Indonesia and the Tuamotus, French Polynesia.

== Taxonomy ==
Dactylanthias was first established by the Dutch ichthyologist Pieter Bleeker in 1871.

== Description ==
Dactylanthias was known only from a single specimen of Dactylanthias aplodactylus from Ambon Island, Indonesia, until another species was described in 2007 from the Tuamotus of French Polynesia.

== Species ==
The following species are classified under Dactylanthias:

- Dactylanthias aplodactylus (Bleeker, 1858)
- Dactylanthias baccheti Randall, 2007
