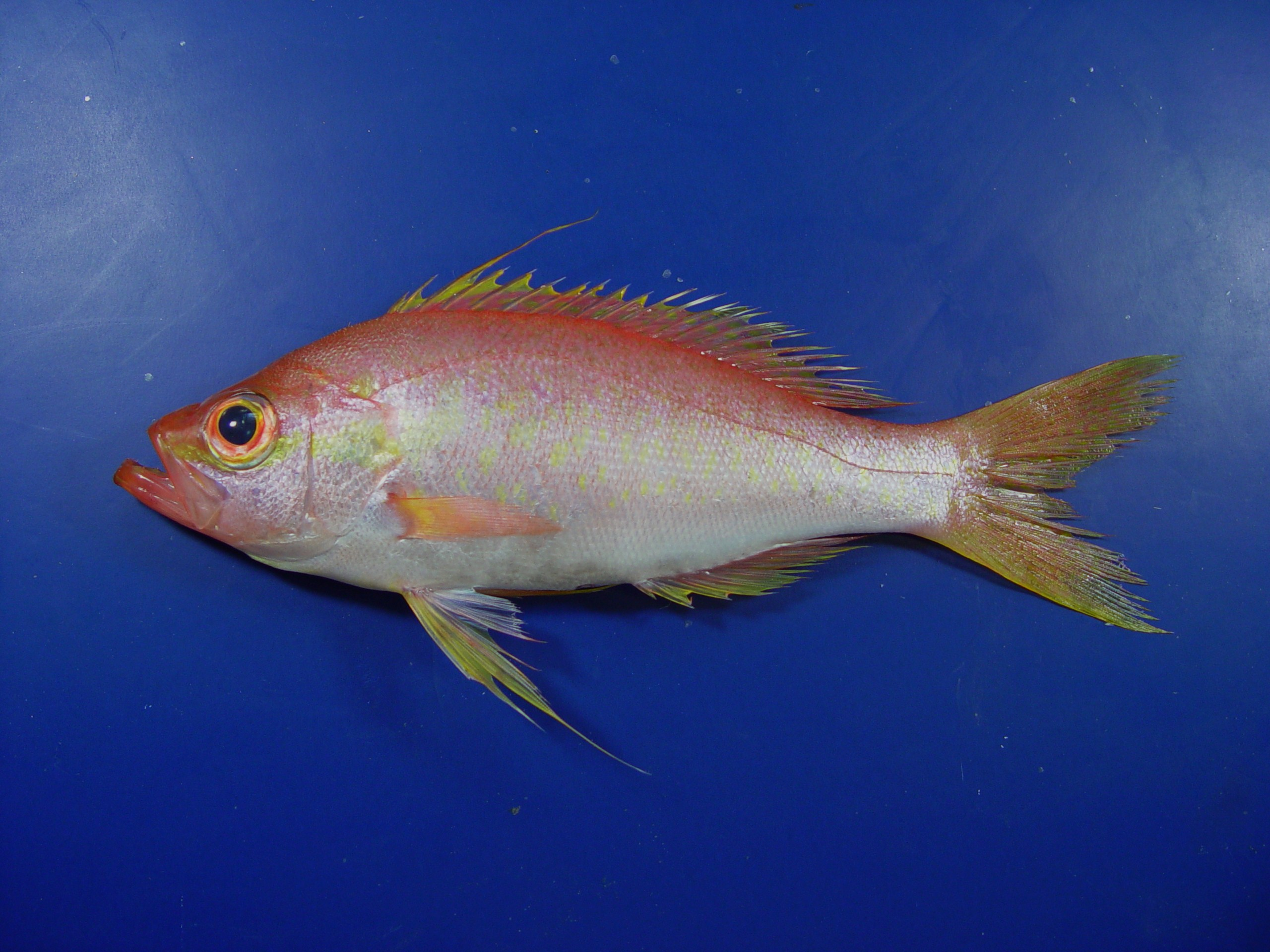
- Hemanthias leptus

Scientific classification
- Kingdom: Animalia
- Phylum: Chordata
- Class: Actinopterygii
- Order: Perciformes
- Family: Anthiadidae
- Genus: Hemanthias; Steindachner, 1875

Type species
- Anthias (Hemianthius) peruanus Steindachner, 1875

Species
- see text

= Hemanthias =

Genus of ray-finned fishes

Hemanthias is a genus of colourful marine ray-finned fish in the family Anthiadidae. They are found at rocky reefs at depths of 20–610 m (66–2,001 ft) in the tropical and subtropical East Pacific and West Atlantic.

They are red, pink and yellow, and reach 25–50 cm (9.8–19.7 in) in length depending on the species.

== Species ==
Based on FishBase, the following species are included in Hemanthias:

- Hemanthias leptus (Longley, 1935) (Longtail bass) - West Atlantic
- Hemanthias peruanus (Steindachner, 1875) (Splittail bass) – East Pacific
- Hemanthias signifer (Garman, 1899) (Damsel bass)– East Pacific
