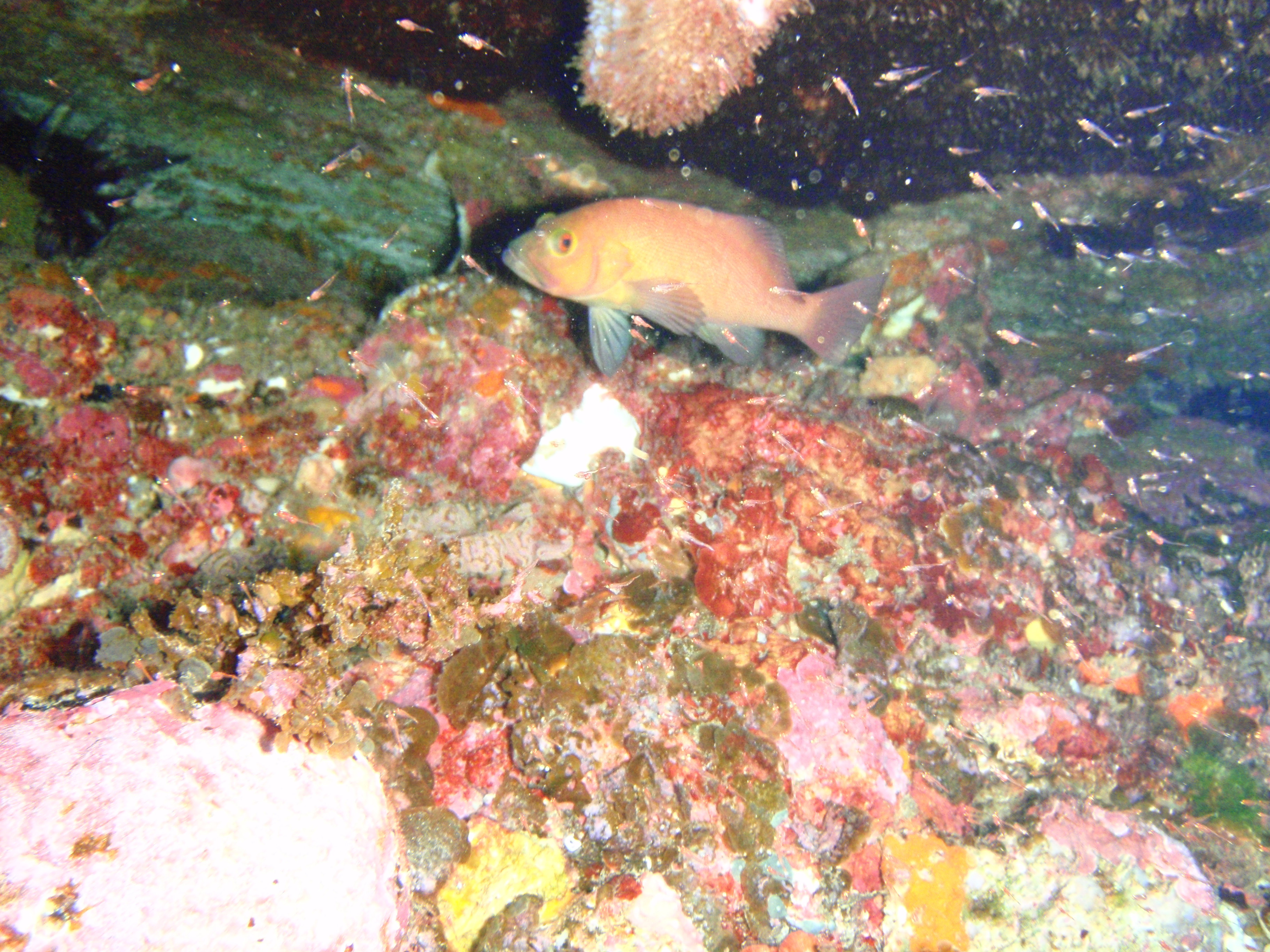

Conservation status
- Near Threatened (IUCN 3.1)

Scientific classification
- Kingdom: Animalia
- Phylum: Chordata
- Class: Actinopterygii
- Division: Teleostei
- Order: Perciformes
- Suborder: Percoidei
- Family: Anthiadidae
- Genus: Epinephelides; Ogilby, 1899
- Species: E. armatus

Binomial name
- Epinephelides armatus (Castelnau, 1875)

Synonyms
- Serranus armatus Castelnau, 1875; Epinephelus armatus (Castelnau, 1875); Epinephelides leai Ogilby, 1899

= Breaksea cod =

Species of ray-finned fish

The breaksea cod (Epinephelides armatus), black-arse cod or tiger cod, is a species of marine ray-finned fish in the family Anthiadidae. It is endemic to Australia. Its natural habitats are open seas, shallow seas, subtidal aquatic beds, and coral reefs. This species is the only member of its genus.
