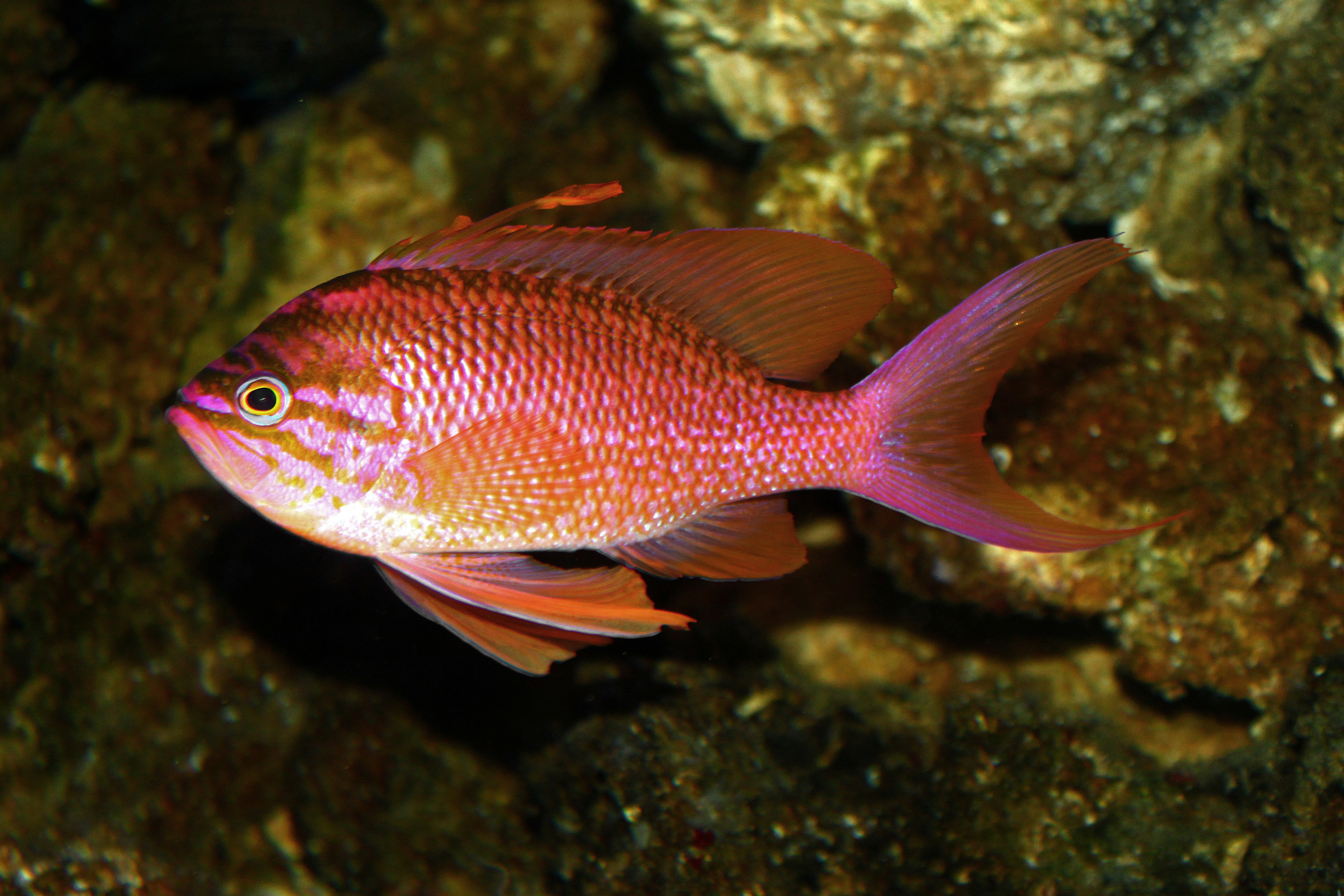
- Anthias anthias

Scientific classification
- Kingdom: Animalia
- Phylum: Chordata
- Class: Actinopterygii
- Order: Perciformes
- Family: Anthiadidae
- Genus: Anthias; Bloch, 1792

Type species
- Labrus anthias Linnaeus, 1758

Species
- see text

= Anthias (genus) =

Genus of ray-finned fishes

Anthias is a genus of colourful ray-finned fishes in the family Anthiadidae. Most species are found at deep reefs in the tropical and subtropical Atlantic, often well below depths reachable to a scuba diver. A single species, A. noeli, is found at deep reefs in the East Pacific.

They are red, pink, orange, or yellow, and the largest species reach 29 cm (11 in) in length. They typically occur in groups that feed on zooplankton.

== Species ==
In the past, this genus included far more species, but these have now been moved to other genera, for example Callanthias, Odontanthias, and Pseudanthias. Based on FishBase, these species are currently included in Anthias:

- Anthias anthias (Linnaeus, 1758) swallowtail sea perch
- Anthias asperilinguis Günther, 1859 jeweled gemfish
- Anthias cyprinoides (Katayama & Amaoka, 1986) Pagalu swallowtail
- Anthias helenensis Katayama & Amaoka, 1986 Saint Helena swallowtail
- Anthias menezesi Anderson & Heemstra, 1980 Brazilian swallowtail
- Anthias nicholsi Firth, 1933 yellowfin bass
- Anthias noeli Anderson & Baldwin, 2000 rosy jewelfish
- Anthias woodsi Anderson & Heemstra, 1980 swallowtail bass
