= Giganthias =

Scientific classification
- Kingdom: Animalia
- Phylum: Chordata
- Class: Actinopterygii
- Order: Perciformes
- Family: Anthiadidae
- Genus: Giganthias; Katayama, 1954

Type species
- Giganthias immaculatus Katayama, 1954

Species
- See text

Genus of fishes

Giganthias is a small genus of marine ray-finned fish belonging to the family Anthiadidae. It contains two species from Japan, Taiwan, and Indonesia.

== Taxonomy ==
Giganthias was first established by Japanese ichthyologist Masao Katayama in 1954 based on two specimens of the type species Giganthias immaculatus recovered from the island of Izu Ōshima in Japan. Katayama initially placed the species in a separate subfamily, Giganthiinae, but it is now accepted to be in the family Anthiadidae.

In 2012, a new species of Giganthias was described from Lombok, Indonesia, based on a specimen recovered from a fish market in the village of Tanjung Luar.

== Description ==
Giganthias are characterized by nine spines on the dorsal fin. The third dorsal spine and the pelvic spines have serrated tips. The lateral line is very highly arched and a supplementary maxillary is present.

== Species ==
Giganthias contains two species:

- Giganthias immaculatus Katayama, 1954
- Giganthias serratospinosus White & Dharmadi, 2012 - Spinyfin perch
