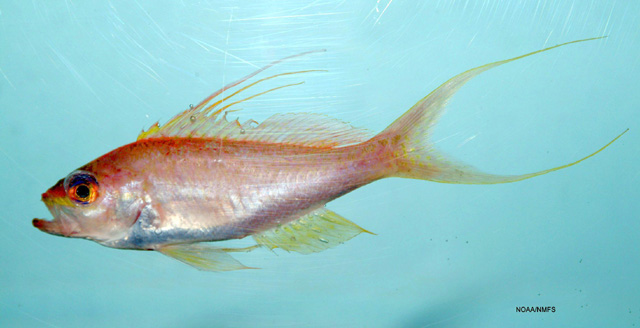
- Baldwinella vivanus

Scientific classification
- Kingdom: Animalia
- Phylum: Chordata
- Class: Actinopterygii
- Order: Perciformes
- Family: Anthiadidae
- Genus: Baldwinella; Anderson & Heemstra, 2012

Type species
- Pronotogrammus aureorubens Longley, 1935

= Baldwinella =

Genus of ray-finned fishes

Baldwinella is a genus of marine ray-finned fish from the family Anthiadidae. It was erected in 2012 and the name honours Carole C. Baldwin of the Division of Fishes at the National Museum of Natural History.

== Species ==
There are two species classified within the genus Baldwinella:

- Baldwinella aureorubens (Longley, 1935) (Streamer bass)
- Baldwinella vivanus (Jordan & Swain, 1885) (Red barbier)
