= John Ernest Randall =

American ichthyologist (1924–2020)

John Ernest "Jack" Randall (May 22, 1924 – April 26, 2020) was an American ichthyologist and a leading authority on coral reef fishes. Randall described over 800 species and authored 11 books and over 900 scientific papers and popular articles. He spent most of his career working in Hawaii. He died in April 2020 at the age of 95

== Career ==
John Ernest Randall was born in Los Angeles, California in May 1924, to John and Mildred (McKibben) Randall. In high school he acquired a love of marine fish after a visit to the tide pools of Palos Verdes and, after serving stateside in the Medical Corps of the U.S. Army during the post-D-Day years of WWII, received his BA degree from the University of California, Los Angeles in 1950. In 1955 he earned his Ph.D in ichthyology from the University of Hawaii.

After spending two years as a research associate at the Bishop Museum in Honolulu, Hawaii, he moved to Miami, Florida and worked briefly at the University of Miami's Marine Laboratory, alongside C. Richard Robins who remained there for his career. From 1961 to 1965 he worked as Professor of Zoology and also, from 1962 to 1965, as the director of the Institute of Marine Biology at the University of Puerto Rico. From 1965 to 1966 he served as the director of the Pacific Foundation of Marine Research's Oceanic Institute, Makapuu Point, Hawaii. From 1966 to 1984 he worked as an ichthyologist at the Bishop Museum, becoming chairman of the museum's zoology department in 1975 and gaining the title of Senior Ichthyologist in 1984. He concurrently served as a marine biologist at the Institute of Marine Biology, University of Hawaii.

In 2005 he was awarded the first Bleeker Award in Systematic Ichthyology at the Seventh Indo-Pacific Fish Conference in Taipei, Taiwan.

== Works ==
- Fishes of the Gilbert Islands, Atoll Res. Bull. 1955, No. 47 (xi - 243 pp.), Pac. Sci, Bd., Nat. Acad. Sci., Wash D. C.
- A Contribution to the Biology of the Acanthuridae (Surgeon Fishes) (1955, in Issue 10 of Theses for the degree of Doctor of Philosophy, University of Hawaii (Honolulu))
- A review of the labrid fish genus Labroides, with descriptions of two new species and notes on ecology. Pac. Sci.
- Let a Sleeping Shark Lie, 1961
- Three New Butterflyfishes (chaetodontidae) from Southeast Oceania, 1975
- (with Henri Lavondès) Les noms de poissons marquisiens, 1978
- (with Roger Lubbock) Three New Labrid Fishes of the Genus Cirrhilabrus from the Southwestern Pacific (in Volume 25, Issue 2 of Occasional papers of the Bernice Pauahi Bishop Museum of Polynesian Ethnology and Natural History, Bishop Museum Press, 1982)
- Caribbean Reef Fishes, 1983
- Pomacanthus Rhomboides (Gilchrist and Thompson), the Valid Name for the South African Angelfish Previously Known as Pomacanthus Striatus (J.L.B. Smith Institute of Ichthyology, 1988, ISBN 978-0-86810-172-9)
- Coastal Fishes of Oman (1995; ISBN 978-0-8248-1808-1)
- Shore Fishes of Hawaii (1996; ISBN 978-0-939560-21-9)
- Annoted Checklist of the Inshore Fishes of the Ogasawara Islands (in Volume 11 of National Science Museum monographs, National Science Museum, 1997)
- (with Phillip C. Heemstra) Review of the Indo-Pacific Fish Genus Odontanthias (Serranidae: Anthiinae), with Descriptions of Two New Species and a Related New Genus in Volume 38 of Indo-Pacific fishes, Bishop Museum, 2006
- (with Jeffrey W. Johnson) Revision of the soleid fish genus Pardachirus, in Indo-Pacific fishes, Bishop Museum, 2007
- (with William N Eschmeyer) Revision of the Indo-Pacific Scorpionfish Genus Scorpaenopsis: With Descriptions of Eight New Species in Indo-Pacific fishes
- Revision of the Goatfish Genus Parupeneus (Perciformes: Mullidae) with Descriptions of Two New Species in Indo-Pacific fishes
- (with Phillip C. Heemstra) Review of the Indo-Pacific Fishes of the Genus Odontanthias (Serranidae: Anthiinae), with Descriptions of Two New Species and a Related New Genus in Indo-Pacific fishes
- (with Margaret M. Smith) A review of the Labrid fishes of the Genus Halichoeres of the Western Indian Ocean, with descriptions of six new species in Ichthyological Bulletin of the J.L.B. Smith Institute of Ichthyology; No. 45. J.L.B. Smith Institute of Ichthyology, Rhodes University. (1982; ISBN 978-0-86810-071-5)
- (with David W. Greenfield) A preliminary review of the Indo-Pacific Gobiid fishes of the genus Gnatholepis in Ichthyological Bulletin of the J.L.B. Smith Institute of Ichthyology; No. 69. J.L.B. Smith Institute of Ichthyology, Rhodes University. (2001; ISSN 0073-4381)
- Parenti, P. and J.E. Randall, 2000. An annotated checklist of the species of the labroid fish families Labridae and Scaridae. Ichthyol. Bull. J.L.B. Smith Inst. Ichthyol. (68):1-97.

== Taxon described by him ==
- See Category:Taxa named by John Ernest Randall

== Taxa named in his honor ==
Randall has had over 60 taxa named in his honor, among them are:

- Assessor randalli Allen & Kuiter, 1976, Randall's assessor or Randall's devilfish, is a species of ray-finned fish belonging to the family Plesiopidae, the longfins or roundheads. It is found in the western Pacific Ocean.
- Diplogrammus randalli R. Fricke, 1983 (Randall's fold dragonet).
- Randall's snapper, Randallichthys filamentosus (Fourmanoir, 1970) is a species of ray-finned fish, a snapper belonging to the family Lutjanidae. It is native to the Indo-Pacific region.
- Acanthopagrus randalli, Middle East Black Seabream, Iwatsuki & Carpenter, 2009
- Gymnothorax randalli, Randall's moray D. G. Smith & E. B. Böhlke, 1997
- Plectranthias randalli Fourmanoir & Rivaton, 1980 is a species of fish in the family Serranidae occurring in the Western Pacific Ocean.
