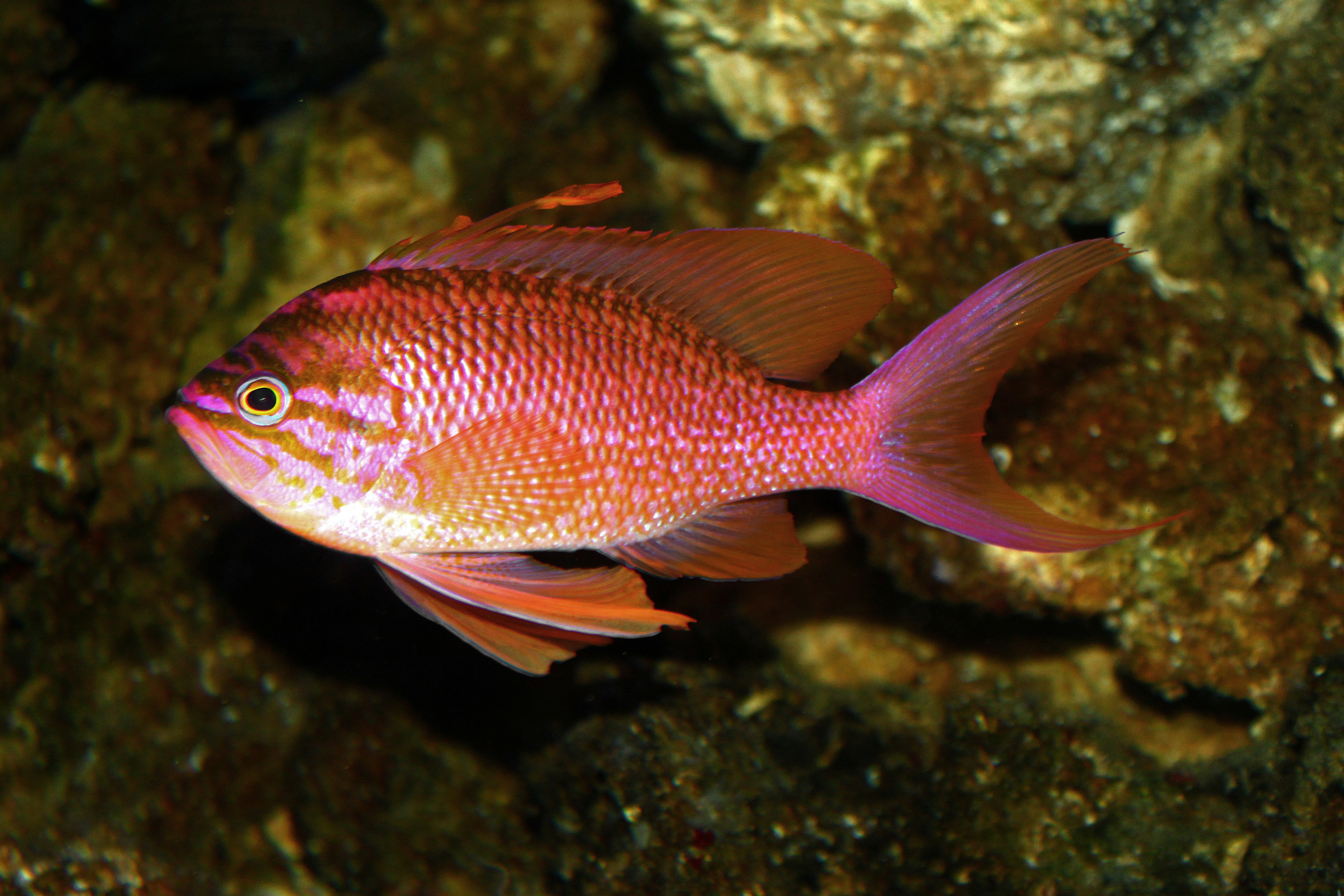
- Anthias anthias

Scientific classification
- Kingdom: Animalia
- Phylum: Chordata
- Class: Actinopterygii
- Order: Perciformes
- Suborder: Percoidei
- Family: Anthiadidae; Poey, 1861

Genera
- See text

Synonyms
- Anthiidae Poey, 1861

= Anthiadidae =

Family of ray-finned fishes

Anthias are members of the family Anthiadidae in the order Perciformes. The group has also been called Anthiidae or Anthiinae, but these names are preoccupied by a subfamily of ground beetles in the family Carabidae erected by Bonelli in 1813.

Anthias are mostly small, thus are quite popular within the ornamental fish trade. They form complex social structures based on the number of males and females and also their position on the reef itself, and are mainly zooplankton feeders. They occur in all tropical oceans and seas of the world. The first species recognized in this group was described in the Mediterranean and northeast Atlantic and was given name Anthias anthias by Carl Linnaeus in 1758.

Anthias can shoal by the thousands. Anthias do school in these large groups, though they tend toward more intimate subdivisions within the school, appropriately called "harems". These consist of one dominant, colorful male, and two to 12 females — which have their own hierarchy among them — and up to two 'subdominant' males, often less brightly colored and not territorial. Within the swarm of females, territorial males perform acrobatic U-swim displays and vigorously defend an area of the reef and its associated harem.

Most anthias are protogynous hermaphrodites. These anthias are born female; if a dominant male perishes, the largest female of the group will often change into a male to take its place. This may lead to squabbling between the next-largest male, which sees an opportunity to advance, and the largest female, whose hormones are surging with testosterone.

Seven genera of anthias are known to occur in coral reef ecosystems: Holanthias, Luzonichthys, Nemanthias, Pseudanthias, Plectranthias, Rabaulichthys, and Serranocirrhitus. Members of all these genera make it into the aquarium trade, although Pseudanthias is by far the most encountered in the hobby.

== Genera ==
The following genera are classified within the family:

- Acanthistius Gill, 1862
- Aepysomanthias Tang & Chen, 2025
- Anatolanthias Anderson, Parin & Randall, 1990
- Anthias Bloch, 1792
- Baldwinella Anderson & Heemstra, 2012
- Caesioperca Castelnau, 1872
- Caprodon Temminck & Schlegel, 1843
- Choranthias Anderson & Heemstra, 2012
- Compsanthias Gill, 2024
- Dactylanthias Bleeker, 1871
- Epinephelides Ogilby, 1899
- Giganthias Katayama, 1954
- Hemanthias Steindachner, 1875
- Holanthias Günther 1868
- Hypoplectrodes Gill, 1862
- Lepidoperca Regan, 1914
- Luzonichthys Herre, 1936
- Meganthias Randall & Heemstra, 2006
- Mirolabrichthys Herre, 1927
- Nemanthias J. L. B. Smith, 1954
- Odontanthias Bleeker, 1873
- Othos Castelnau, 1875
- Pelontrus J. L. B. Smith, 1961
- Plectranthias Bleeker, 1873
- Poroanthias Tang & Chen, 2025
- Pronotogrammus Gill, 1863
- Pseudanthias Bleeker, 1871
- Rabaulichthys Allen, 1984
- Sacura Jordan & Richardson, 1910
- Sayonara Jordan & Seale, 1906
- Selenanthias Tanaka, 1918
- Serranocirrhitus Watanabe, 1949
- Tosana H.M. Smith & Pope, 1906
- Tosanoides Kamohara, 1953
- Trachypoma Günther, 1859
- Xenanthias Regan, 1908
- Zalanthias Jordan & Richardson, 1910
