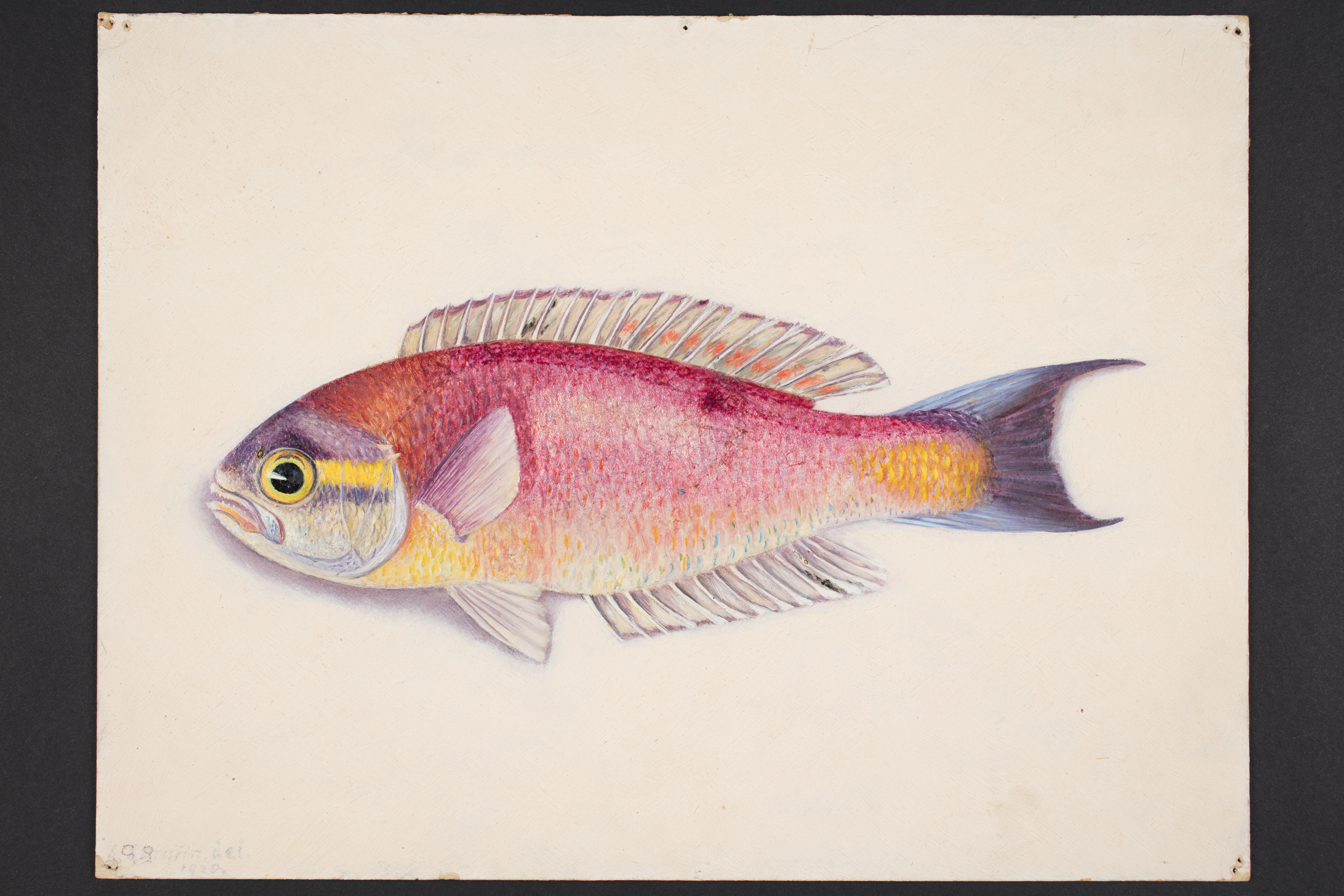

Scientific classification
- Kingdom: Animalia
- Phylum: Chordata
- Class: Actinopterygii
- Order: Acanthuriformes
- Family: Callanthiidae
- Genus: Callanthias
- Species: C. australis

Binomial name
- Callanthias australis Ogilby, 1899

Synonyms
- Callanthias platei australis Ogilby, 1899; Callanthias splendens Griffin, 1921

= Callanthias australis =

Species of fish

Callanthias australis, the magnificent sea perch, splendid perch, glorious groppo or Northern splendid perch, is a species of marine ray-finned fish belonging to the family Callanthiidae. This species is found in the southeastern Indian Ocean and the southwestern Pacific Ocean.

== Taxonomy ==
Callanthias australis was first formally described in 1899 by the Australian zoologist James Douglas Ogilby with its type locality given as off Norah Head north of Port Jackson, New South Wales. This species is closely related to C. japonicus and C. platei and these taxa may be subspecies of a single species, C. platei, but given their widely parapatric distributions some authors consider that they are three valid species despite the morphological similarities. The genus Callanthias is one of two classified in the family Callanthiidae which the 5th edition of Fishes of the World classifies in the order Spariformes.

== Etymology ==
Callanthias australis has the specific name australis which means "southern", this species was described by Ogliby as a subspecies of C. platei.

== Description ==
Callanthias australis has a continuous dorsal fin which is supported by 11 spines and between 10 and 12 soft rays while the anal fin has 3 spines and 10 or 11 soft rays. It has a moderately elongated body with a small, oblique mouth. The shape of the caudal fin varies from emarginate to almost truncate with larger individuals developing long filaments from the tip of each lobe. The colour of juveniles is light pink with light blue fins. The females are pale red to orangey-red with silvery on the lower face and throat and pale fins. The males have a purplish red head and front of the body with the rear body being red. The dorsal and anal fins are brown while the caudal fin is bluish purple with red tips and a yellow centre. This species has a maximum published standard length of 49 cm (19 in).

== Distribution and habitat ==
Callanthias australis is found in the southwestern Pacific Ocean and into the southeastern Indian Ocean. In Australia this species is found from Moreton Bay in Queensland south and west to Rottnest Island in Western Australia, it is also found off Norfolk Island in the Tasman Sea. In New Zealand it is found to the north of the range of C. allporti being found from the Kermadec Islands south to Castlepoint and Westport in the northern South Island. In New Zealand this species has the common name of Northern splendid perch while C. australis is the Southern Splendid perch. The magnificent sea perch is found at depths of between 20 and 365 m (66 and 1,198 ft) on deep reefs and rocky pinnacles, although juveniles are found in water as shallow of 10 m (33 ft) in inshore waters.

== Biology ==
Callanthias australis feeds on zooplankton, particularly crustaceans. It is a diurnal species which shelters in caves and crevices at nights and flees to these as sanctuaries when disturbed. It is a schooling species which forms mixed species schools with the anthiin serranids, the butterfly perch (Caesioperca lepidoptera) and pink maomao (Caprodon longimanus). The colour of the males become more intense during the breeding season. Spawning schools are formed between August and November when a small number of males will raise their dorsala nd anal fins and circle around 1 or 2 females before they all swim up the water column and release the sperm and eggs before descending.
