= Sea perch =

Sea perch, sea-perch or seaperch are the common names of various fishes, including:

- Fishes of the family Sebastidae, especially those of the genus Sebastes (more commonly known as rockfish)
- Caesioperca rasor (also known as barber perch)
- The orange roughy, a.k.a. deep sea perch
- The splendid sea perch
- The red sea perch, Lutjanus argentimaculatus
- The Waigieu seaperch
- The bluestripe snapper, a.k.a. bluestripe sea perch
- The striped surfperch, Embiotoca lateralis, also called the striped seaperch
- The swallowtail sea perch

== See also ==
- SeaPerch, a remotely operated vehicle educational program
