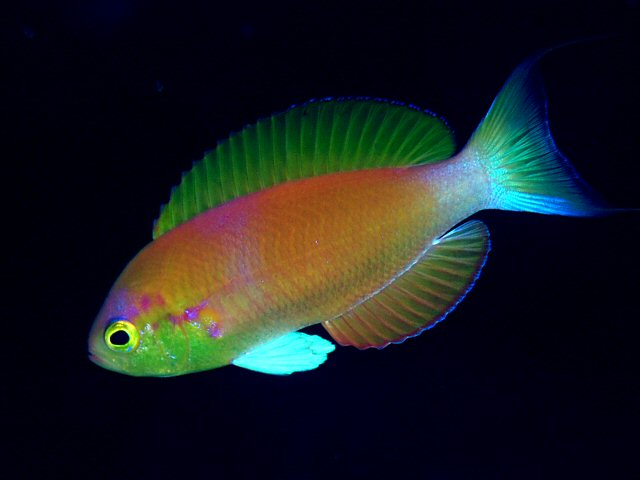

Conservation status
- Least Concern (IUCN 3.1)

Scientific classification
- Kingdom: Animalia
- Phylum: Chordata
- Class: Actinopterygii
- Order: Acanthuriformes
- Family: Callanthiidae
- Genus: Callanthias
- Species: C. japonicus

Binomial name
- Callanthias japonicus Franz, 1910

= Callanthias japonicus =

Species of fish

Callanthias japonicus, the Japanese splendid perch or yellowsail sea bass, is a species of marine ray-finned fish belonging to the family Callanthiidae. This species is found in the northwestern Pacific Ocean.

== Taxonomy ==
Callanthias japonicus was first formally described in 1910 by the German zoologist Victor Julius Franz with its type locality given as Aburatsubo in the Sagami Sea of Japan. This species is closely related to C. australis and C. platei and these taxa may be subspecies of a single species, C. platei, but given their widely parapatric distributions some authors consider that they are three valid species despite the morphological similarities. The genus Callanthias is one of two classified in the family Callanthiidae which the 5th edition of Fishes of the World classifies in the order Spariformes.

== Description ==
Callanthias japonicus has a dorsal fin which is supported by 10 spines and between 11 or 12 soft rays while the anal fin has 3 spines and 10 or 11 soft rays. It has an elongate, compressed body with a short, blunt snout. The preoperculum is rounded and has no spines or serrations but the operculum has 2 spines. The overall colour is pink, shading to yellow on the blower body. This species has a maximum published standard length of 23.3 cm (9.2 in).

== Distribution and habitat ==
Callanthias japonicus is found in the northwestern Pacific Ocean where it is found from southern Japan, southern South Korea south through the Ryukyu Islands to Taiwan. It has been claimed from the Emperor Seamounts but this has to be verified. This species is found over rocky reefs at depths greater than 60 m (200 ft). It feeds on zooplankton and frequently forms mixed schools with anthiin serranids.

== Utilisation ==
Callanthias japonicus is traded in the aquarium trade. It is taken as bycatch by demersal trawler fisheries in the East China Sea and has been found in fish markets.
