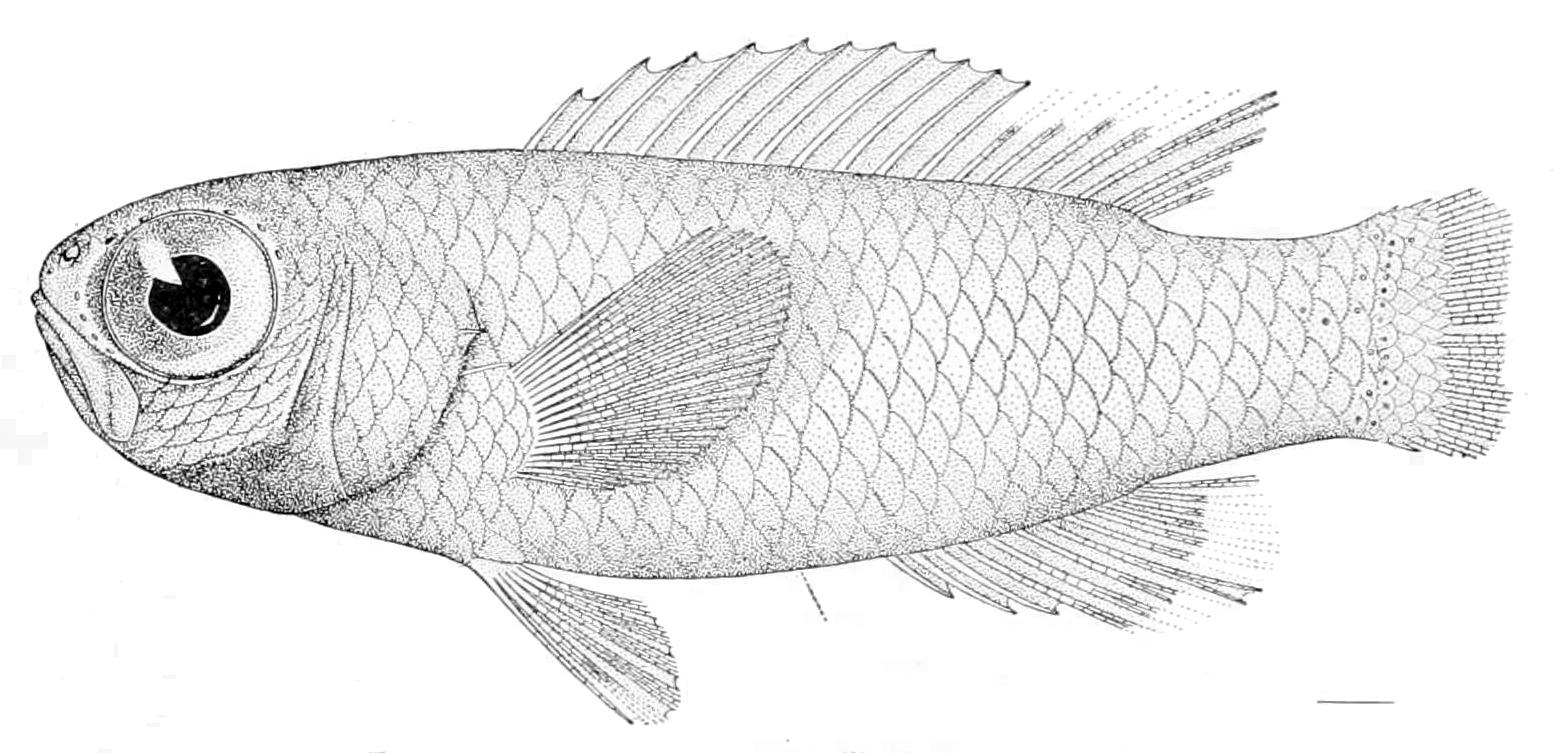

Scientific classification
- Kingdom: Animalia
- Phylum: Chordata
- Class: Actinopterygii
- Order: Acanthuriformes
- Family: Callanthiidae
- Genus: Grammatonotus
- Species: G. laysanus

Binomial name
- Grammatonotus laysanus Gilbert, 1905

= Grammatonotus laysanus =

Species of fish

Grammatonotus laysanus, the purple groppo, is a species of marine ray-finned fish belonging to the family Callanthiidae, the groppos and splendid perches. This fish is found in the Pacific Ocean.

== Taxonomy ==
Grammatonotus laysanus was first formally described in 1905 by the American ichthyologist Charles Henry Gilbert with its type locality given as off Laysan in the Northwestern Hawaiian Islands, When Gilbert described this species he classified it in a new monospecific genus, Grammatonotus, and designating G. laysanus as the type species of the genus. The 5th edition of Fishes of the World classifies Grammatonotus as one of two genera in the family Callanthiidae, which it places in the order Spariformes.

== Description ==
Grammatonotus laysanus has a violet red body, silvery on its lower flanks, a yellow dorsal fin, purple anal fin, a purplish red caudal fin with yellow outer rays, light orange pectoral fins and purple-red pelvic fins. The dorsal fin is supported by 11 spines and 9, infrequently 10, soft rays while the anal fin has 3 spines and 9 soft rays. The caudal fin is rounded with two filamentous extensions running from the upper and lower margins. This species has a maximum published standard length of 12.8 cm (5.0 in).

== Distribution and habitat ==
Grammatonotus laysanus is found in the Pacific Ocean. It has been recorded from New Guinea, New Caledonia, Vanuatu, Kiribati, Johnston Atoll, the Hawaiian Ridge, Hawaiian Islands, Line Islands; Nazca Ridge and the Sala-y-Gomez Ridge. This is a pelagic and Oceanic species found at depths between 170 and 372 m (558 and 1,220 ft).
