= Callanthias legras =

Scientific classification
- Kingdom: Animalia
- Phylum: Chordata
- Class: Actinopterygii
- Order: Acanthuriformes
- Family: Callanthiidae
- Genus: Callanthias
- Species: C. legras

Binomial name
- Callanthias legras J. L. B. Smith, 1948

Species of fish

Callanthias legars, the goldie or African splendid perch, is a species of marine ray-finned fish belonging to the family Callanthiidae. This species is found in the southeastern Atlantic Ocean off southern Africa.

== Taxonomy ==
Callanthias legras was first formally described in 1948 by the South African ichthyologist J. L. B. Smith with its type locality given as Algoa Bay in South Africa. The genus Callanthias is one of two classified in the family Callanthiidae which the 5th edition of Fishes of the World classifies in the order Spariformes.

== Etymology ==
Callanthias legras has the specific name legras and this honours Mr M. G. le Gras, a fish collector from Port Elizabeth, although he apparently did not collect any specimens of this species.

== Description ==
Callanthias legras has a dorsal fin which is supported by 11 spines and 10 or 11 soft rays while the anal fin has 3 spines and 10 soft rays. The upper body and head is mainly orange, with vivid yellow longitudinal band extending from the snout enclosing the eye and running the length of body to merge with the yellow caudal fin. Underneath this yellow band is a lilac band which extends from the snout nearly all the way to the caudal peduncle with another yellow band extending from the base of the pelvic fin to the caudal peduncle. The eye has a yellow iris with a mauve edges. The dorsal, anal and caudal fins are yellow with the posterior rays of the dorsal fin being orange and the same rays of the anal fin being red. The highest and lowest fin rays in the caudal fin are vermilion at their base and lilac towards their tips. The pectoral fins are yellow but have lilac colour near the base on the ventral surface while the pelvic fin is white. The goldie has a maximum published total length of 25 cm (9.8 in).

== Distribution and habitat ==
Callanthias legras is found in the southeastern Atlantic and southwestern Indian Ocean off the coasts of southern Africa. It occurs from Dassen Island in the Northern Cape Province to KwaZulu-Natal. It may also be found off Namibia but its presence there is yet to be confirmed. The goldie is found at depths of 50 to 200 m (160 to 660 ft) over rock substrates.
