= Grammatonotus bianchi =

Scientific classification
- Kingdom: Animalia
- Phylum: Chordata
- Class: Actinopterygii
- Order: Acanthuriformes
- Family: Callanthiidae
- Genus: Grammatonotus
- Species: G. bianchi

Binomial name
- Grammatonotus bianchi Lisher, Thein & Psomadakis, 2021

Species of ray-finned fish

Grammatonotus bianchi is species of ray-finned fish in the genus of Grammatonotus. It was discovered by Lisher, Thein & Psomadakis in 2021 from the coastal waters of Myanmar.
