= Callanthias parini =

Scientific classification
- Kingdom: Animalia
- Phylum: Chordata
- Class: Actinopterygii
- Order: Acanthuriformes
- Family: Callanthiidae
- Genus: Callanthias
- Species: C. parini

Binomial name
- Callanthias parini W. D. Anderson & G. D. Johnson, 1984

Species of ray-finned fish

Callanthias parini, the Nazca splendid perch or Parin's groppo, is a species of marine ray-finned fish belonging to the family Callanthiidae, the splendid perches and groppos. This species is found in the eastern Pacific Ocean.
