= Lake Carabundup =

Lake in Western Australia

- Location in Western Australia
- Interactive map of Lake Carabundup
- Location: Western Australia
- Coordinates: 34°27′54″S 117°17′43″E
- Type: saline
- Catchment area: 127 km^{2} (49 sq mi)
- Basin countries: Australia
- Max. length: 1.7 km (1.1 mi)
- Max. width: 1 km (0.62 mi)
- Surface area: 1.85 km^{2} (0.71 sq mi)
- Average depth: 4 m (13 ft) (maximum)
- Shore length^{1}: 5.3 km (3.3 mi)
- Islands: none
- ^{1} Shore length is not a well-defined measure.

Lake Carabundup is an ephemeral salt lake in the Great Southern region of Western Australia, approximately 25 km (16 mi) south west of Cranbrook and 30 km (19 mi) north east of Rocky Gully. It is located in a watershed between the Kent River and Frankland River catchments.

The lake has a length of approximately 2 km (1.2 mi) and a width of approximately 1 km (0.62 mi); it has neither dried up nor overflowed in the past 20 years. It covers an area of 1.85 km^{2} (0.71 sq mi) and has a volume of 5.17 GL (183,000,000 cu ft) at overflow level with a maximum depth of 4 m (13 ft) when at full capacity. The average inflow into the lake from 1973 to 2001 was 1.9 GL (67,000,000 cu ft), of which about 84% evaporates.

The catchment area occupies an area of 127 km^{2} (49 sq mi) and includes undulating landforms, broad flats and smaller lakes. The broad flats and lakes mostly have lateritic soils. Other major lakes found in the area include Lake Nunijup and Lake Poorrarecup. The flat ancient landscape has weakly-developed drainage. There are rarely any instances of overflow from the area into the river system even after clearing has increased surface water runoff. Other smaller lakes within the catchment include Lake Nukennullup, Stockyard Lake and Mineral Lake which have a combined surface area of around 300 ha (740 acres).

The lake is used for swimming, and a drowning occurred there in 2007.

The lake provides habitat for at least three species of shore bird, including the musk duck.

== See also ==
- List of lakes of Australia § Western Australia
