= Barred groppo =

Scientific classification
- Domain: Eukaryota
- Kingdom: Animalia
- Phylum: Chordata
- Class: Actinopterygii
- Order: Acanthuriformes
- Family: Callanthiidae
- Genus: Grammatonotus
- Species: G. pelipel

Binomial name
- Grammatonotus pelipel Anderson & Johnson 2017

Species of ray-finned fish

Grammatonotus pelipel, also known as barred groppo, is a species of ray-finned fish in the family Callanthiidae, endemic to deep reefs of Pohnpei Island, Micronesia. The etymology of its scientific name pelipel comes from the Pohnpeian language which means tattoo or tattooed, due to the small faded stripes that juveniles have.
