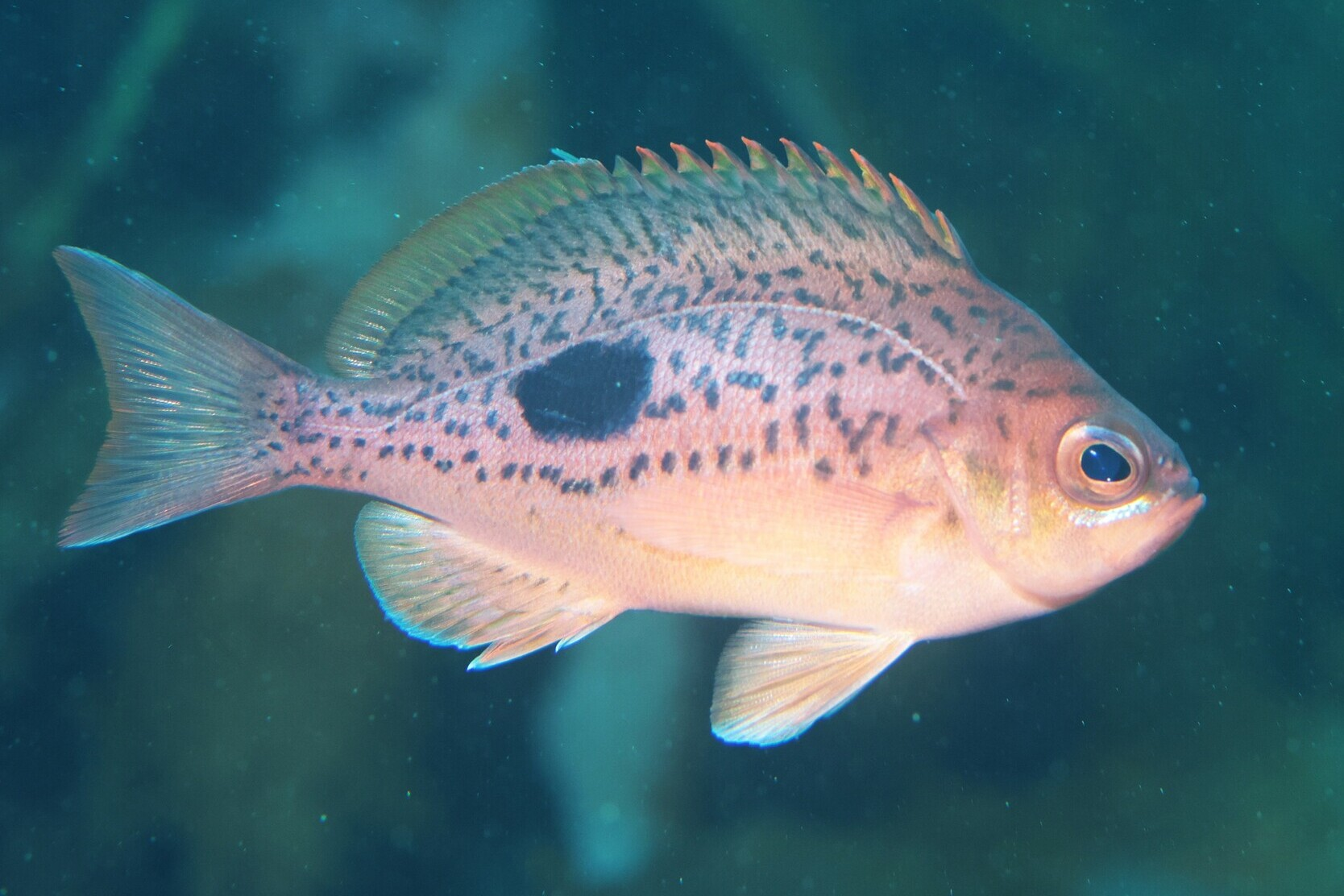
- Caesioperca lepidoptera
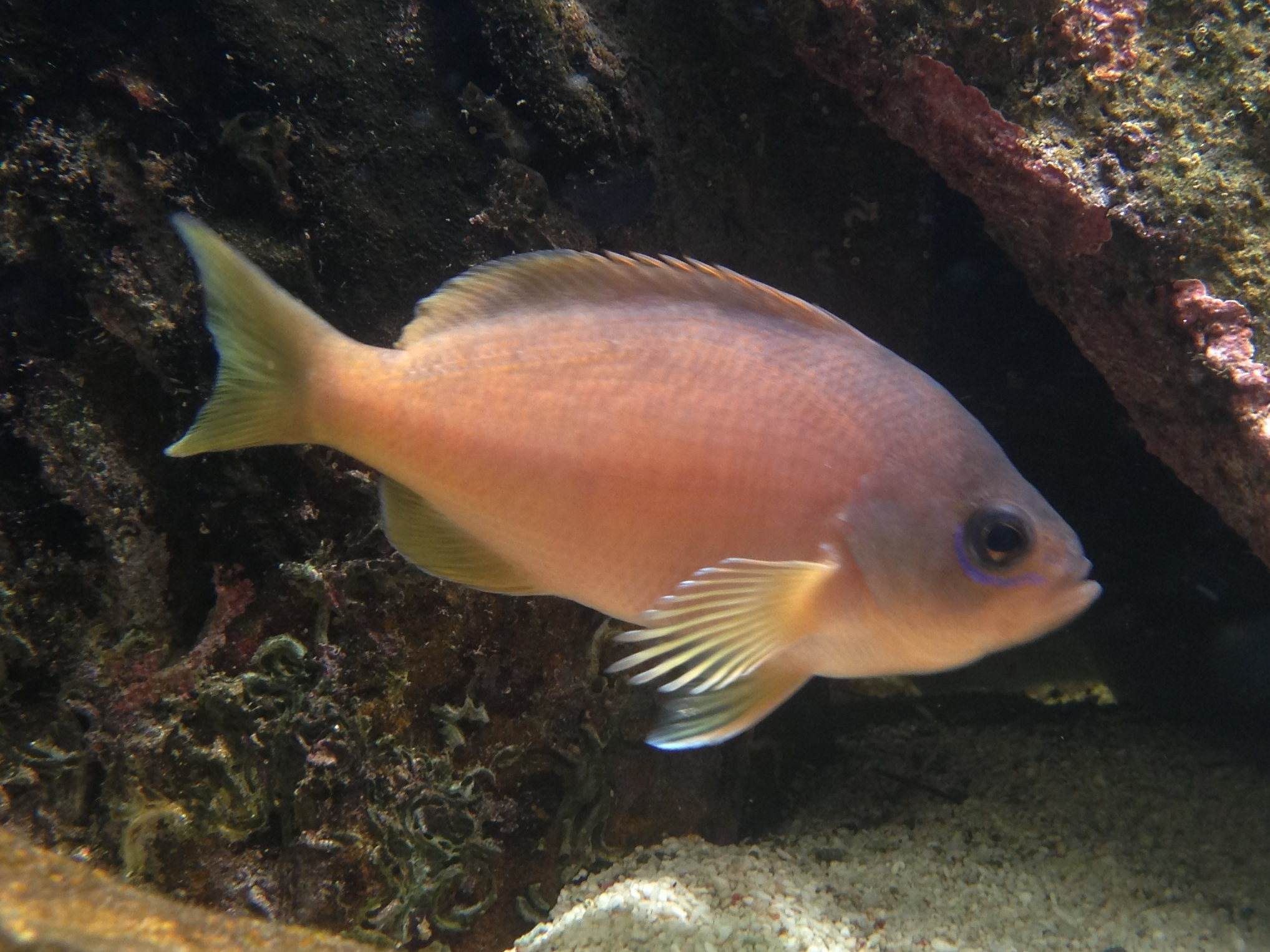
- Caesioperca rasor

Scientific classification
- Kingdom: Animalia
- Phylum: Chordata
- Class: Actinopterygii
- Order: Perciformes
- Family: Anthiadidae
- Genus: Caesioperca; Castelnau, 1872

Species
- see text

Synonyms
- Lacepedia Castelnau, 1873

= Caesioperca =

Genus of ray-finned fishes

Caesioperca is a genus of ray-finned fish in the family Anthiadidae. It contains just two species, found in the ocean off Southern Australia and New Zealand.

== Species ==
- Caesioperca lepidoptera (Forster, 1801) (Butterfly perch)
- Caesioperca rasor (Richardson, 1839) (Barber perch)
