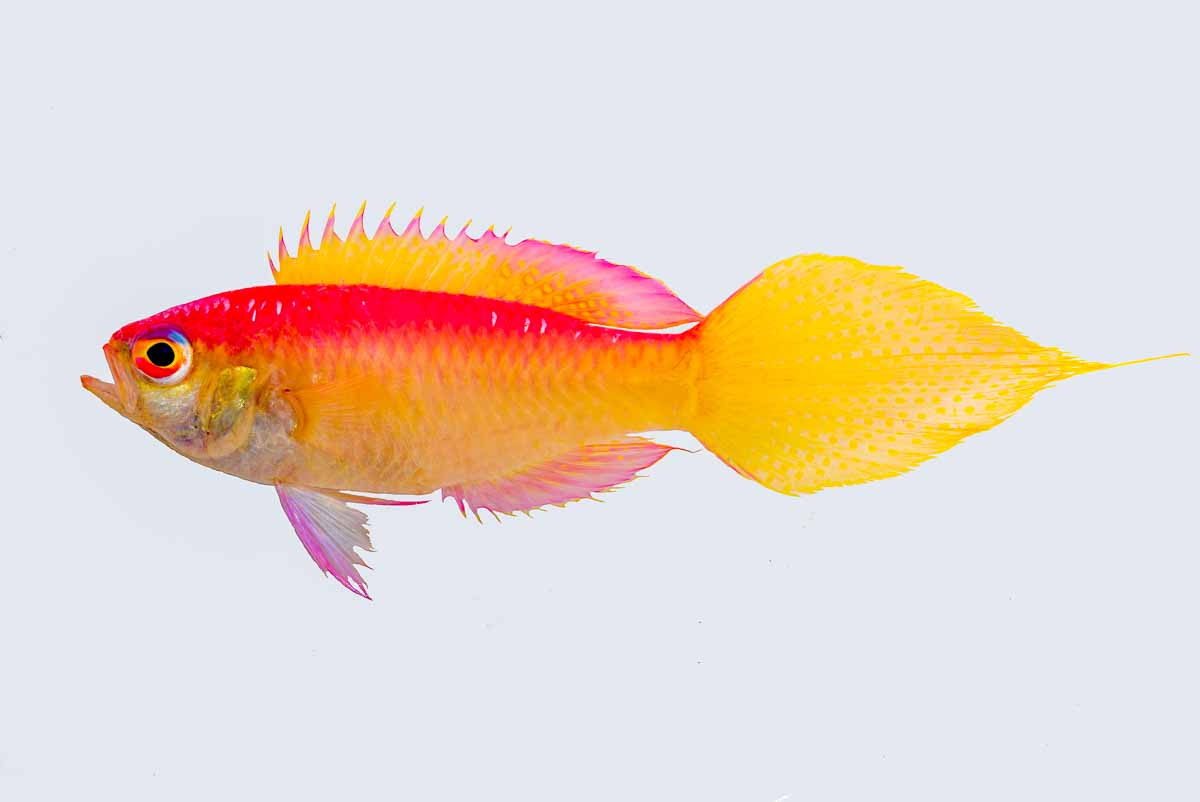

Scientific classification
- Domain: Eukaryota
- Kingdom: Animalia
- Phylum: Chordata
- Class: Actinopterygii
- Order: Acanthuriformes
- Family: Callanthiidae
- Genus: Grammatonotus
- Species: G. brianne

Binomial name
- Grammatonotus brianne Anderson, Greene & Rocha, 2016

= Grammatonotus brianne =

Species of fish

Grammatonotus brianne, the Batangas groppo, is a deep water fish of the family Callanthiidae. This species is known only from the waters off Luzon in the Philippines.

== Taxonomy ==
Grammatonotus brianne was first formally described in 2016 by William Dewey Anderson Jr., Brian D. Greene and Luiz A. Rocha with its type locality given as Batangas Province on Luzon in the Philippines. The 5th edition of Fishes of the World classifies Grammatonotus as one of two genera in the family Callanthiidae, which it places in the order Spariformes.

== Etymology ==
Grammatonotus brianne has the specific name brianne, this is a noun in apposition honoring Brianne M. Atwood, Bryan D. Greene's wife.

== Description ==
Grammatonotus brianne is identified from other Grammatonotus species by its diamond-shaped caudal fin with the central rays extending beyond the membrane, disjunct lateral lines and short anal fin rays. Its coloration is also distinctive with a rosy to red upper body and upper head, the mid body has a pale pink to yellow band with a yellow to purplish lower body. The iris is yellow, with a red band on its margins, and a blue bar on its rear margin. The dorsal fin is yellow to yellow orange with yellow spots at its base and purple along its margins, the caudal fin is yellow with paler yellow spots. The anal and pelvic fins are pale purple and the pectoral fins are yellow. The maximum published standard length for this species is 8.4 cm (3.3 in).

== Distribution and habitat ==
Grammatonotus brianne is only known from off Batangas province in the Philippines. It holds the record as being the deepest species of fish described based on specimens collected by divers, all of the fishes described based on specimens caught deeper than 150m were collected by hook and line, traps, trawls, submarines, or other indirect methods. It inhabits high complexity habitats at depths in excess of 140m.
