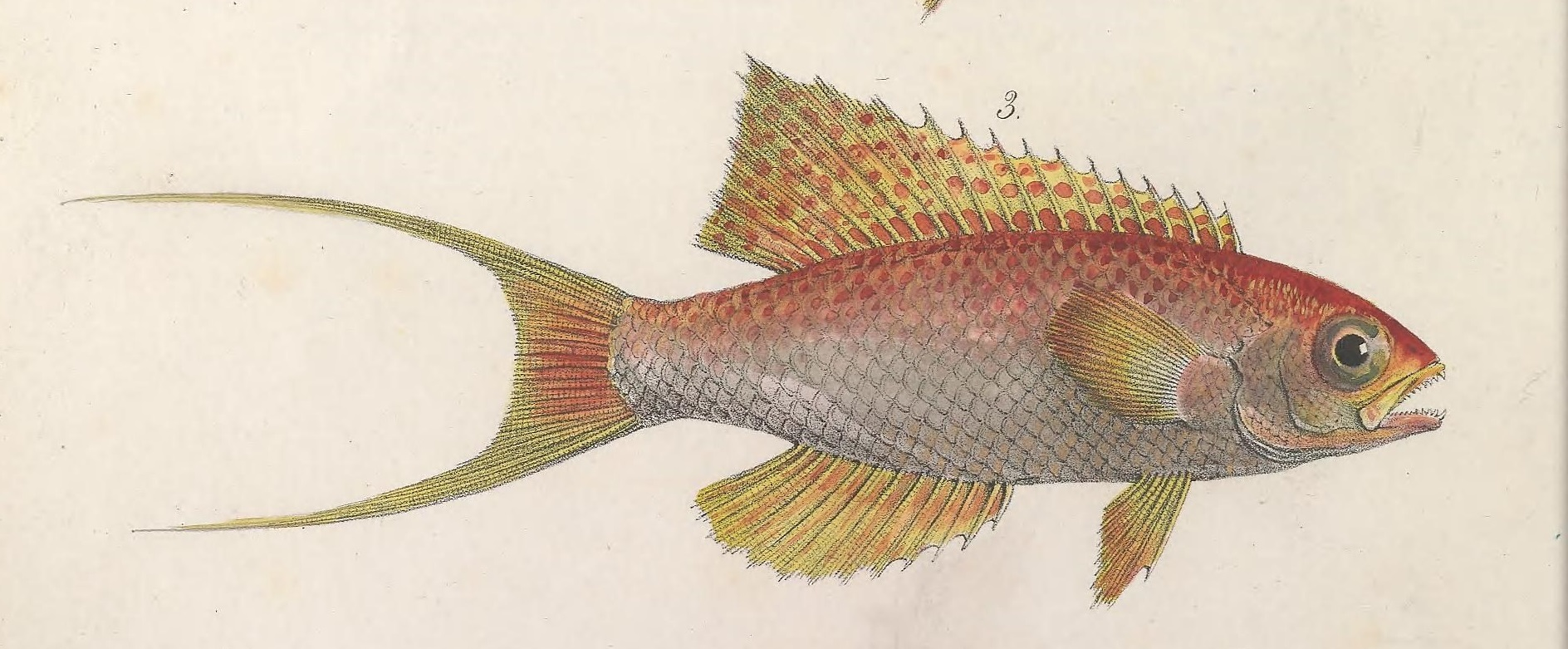

Conservation status
- Least Concern (IUCN 3.1)

Scientific classification
- Kingdom: Animalia
- Phylum: Chordata
- Class: Actinopterygii
- Order: Acanthuriformes
- Family: Callanthiidae
- Genus: Callanthias
- Species: C. ruber

Binomial name
- Callanthias ruber (Rafinesque, 1810)

Synonyms
- Lepimphis ruber Rafinesque, 1810; Bodianus peloritanus Cocco, 1829; Callanthias peloritanus (Cocco, 1829); Anthias buphthalmos Bonaparte, 1833; Callanthias paradisaeus Lowe, 1839

= Parrot seaperch =

Species of fish

The parrot seaperch (Callanthias ruber), also known as the bird of paradise fish or Eastern Atlantic groppo, is a species of marine ray-finned fish belonging to the family Callanthiidae, the splendid perches and groppos. This fish is found in the northeastern Atlantic and Mediterranean.

== Taxonomy ==
The parrot seaperch was first formally described as Lepimphis ruber in 1810 by the French polymath Constantine Samuel Rafinesque with its type locality given as Palermo on Sicily. In 1839 Richard Thomas Lowe described a new species from Madeira which he assigned to a new monospecific genus called Callanthius paradisaeus. It was later shown that Lowe's species was synonymous with Lepimphis ruber and so this species is the type species of the genus Callanthias. The genus Callanthias is one of two classified in the family Callanthiidae which the 5th edition of Fishes of the World classifies in the order Spariformes.

== Etymology ==
The parrot seaperch has the specific name ruber meaning "red" and Rafinesque described the fish as having a "spotless red body" and red is one of the dominant colours of this species.

== Description ==
The parrot seaperch has a slender body in which the depth fits into the standard length 3 times. The dorsal fin is typically supported by 11 spines and 10 or 11 soft rays, with the soft-rayed part being taller than the spiny part. The anal fin is supported by 3 spines and 9 or 10 soft rays. The pelvic fins are short, while the pectoral fins typically have 20 or 21 fin rays and the caudal fin is lunate. In fishes with a standard length greater than 13 cm (5.1 in) the lobes of the caudal fin have filamentous elongations to the lobes. It has an incomplete lateral line which ends just to the rear of the base of the dorsal fin. The body is largely red and the fins are yellow but the colour can vary with photographs showing yellow longitudinal stripes or white overall body colour with two broad pink bars below the lateral line. Other photographs show individuals with a patch of yellow colour on the head and upper body. This species has a maximum published total length of 60 cm (24 in).

== Distribution and habitat ==
The parrot seaperch is found in the eastern Atlantic Ocean where its distribution extends from the English Channel, where it is infrequently recorded south to Mauritania, including the Macaronesian Islands and the Great Meteor Seamount, and throughout the Mediterranean Sea. It is found at depths between 50 and 500 m (160 and 1,640 ft) over rocks and mud and in undersea caves.

== Biology ==
The parrot seaperch has been recorded forming dense shoals in the Azores. In the Mediterranean spawning takes place in December and January. This species may be a protogynous hermaphrodite. It is a carnivorous species which feeds on crustaceans and small fishes. On the Seine seamount the parrot seaperch was found to have a diet dominated by small pelagic copepods.

== Utilisation ==
The parrot seaperch is targeted by recreational anglers and artisanal fisheries, and it is taken as bycatch by commercial trawlers in Sicily but only in Morocco is it regularly found in fish markets.
