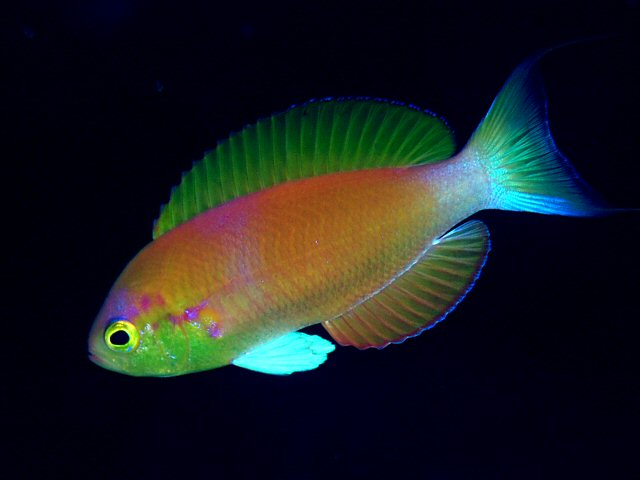
- Callanthias japonicus

Scientific classification
- Kingdom: Animalia
- Phylum: Chordata
- Class: Actinopterygii
- Order: Acanthuriformes
- Family: Callanthiidae
- Genus: Callanthias; R. T. Lowe, 1839

Type species
- Callanthias paradisaeus Lowe, 1839

Synonyms
- Anogramma Ogilby, 1899; Percanthias Tanaka, 1922

= Callanthias =

Genus of fishes

Callanthias is a genus of marine ray-finned fishes belonging to the family Callanthiidae. These fishes are primarily found in subtropical parts of the Pacific Ocean, with one species marginally in the Indian Ocean and two species in the eastern Atlantic Ocean.

== Taxonomy ==
Callanthias was first proposed as a monospecific genus in 1839 by the English zoologist Richard Thomas Lowe when he described Callanthias paradiseus. Lowe’s Callanthias paradiseus is now known to be a synonym of Lepimphis ruber, described by Constantine Samuel Rafinesque in 1810 from Palermo on Sicily. The relationships of Callianthias have been subject of some uncertainty in the past and they were previously regarded as a very aberrant genus of the Serranidae, while other authors placed it in the Grammatidae. Callanthias is one of two genera in the family Callanthiidae, the other is Grammatonotus, which the 5th edition of Fishes of the World places in the order Spariformes.

== Etymology ==
Callianthias is a combination of callos, meaning "beautiful", and Anthias a genus in the family Serranidae. Lowe named the genus this because he described its type species, Callanthias paradisaeus, as "a most elegant little fish" and "almost as rare as beautiful" and noted the resemblance on form and dentition to Anthias.

== Species ==
Despite being in separate families, some Callanthias have been included in the genus Anthias in the past. There are currently 8 recognized species in this genus:

- Callanthias allporti Günther, 1876 (Southern splendid perch)
- Callanthias australis J. D. Ogilby, 1899 (Magnificent splendid perch)
- Callanthias japonicus V. Franz, 1910 (Japanese splendid perch)
- Callanthias legras J. L. B. Smith, 1948 (Goldie)
- Callanthias parini W. D. Anderson & G. D. Johnson, 1984 (Nazca splendid perch)
- Callanthias platei Steindachner, 1898 (Juan Fernández splendid perch)
- Callanthias ruber (Rafinesque, 1810) (Parrot seaperch)
- Callanthias splendens Griffin, 1921

== Characteristics ==
Callanthias splendid perches are characterised by having relatively elongated bodies with a short, blunt head which has a large eye located close to the end of the head. They have oblique mouths that extend to underneath the middle of the eye and there is a single outer row of conical teeth in each jaw with an inner row of smaller conical or villiform teeth. There are aloso a few forward pointing canine-like teeth. They may or may not have very small teeth in the palatine The operculum has two short spines on its upper part but the preoperculum has no spines or serrations. The scales are large and ctenoid. The dorsal and anal fins are not incised and the soft rays are longer than the spines. The caudal fin is forked and the males have long filaments extending from both lobes. They appear to be protogynous and when they change from female to male this is associated with changes in size, morphology and colouration. The largest species is the magnificent splendid perch (C. australis) with a maximum published standard length of 49 cm (19 in) but most species have maximum lengths between 17.9 and 30 cm (7.0 and 11.8 in). These are brightly coloured fishes with the colours red, orange, yellow and purple being typical.

== Distribution and habitat ==
Callanthias splendid perches are found in temperate and subtropical seas with most species occurring in the Pacific Ocean. One species, the Southern splendid perch (C. allporti) extends into the southeastern Indian Ocean while there are two Atlantic species. Of these the goldie (C. legras) is found in the southeastern Atlantic off Southern Africa and the parrot seaperch (C. ruber) is found in the northeastern Atlantic and the Mediterranean. They occur on deep reefs, rockwalls, pinnacle and seamounts.
