= Lake Poorrarecup =

Salt lake in Western Australia

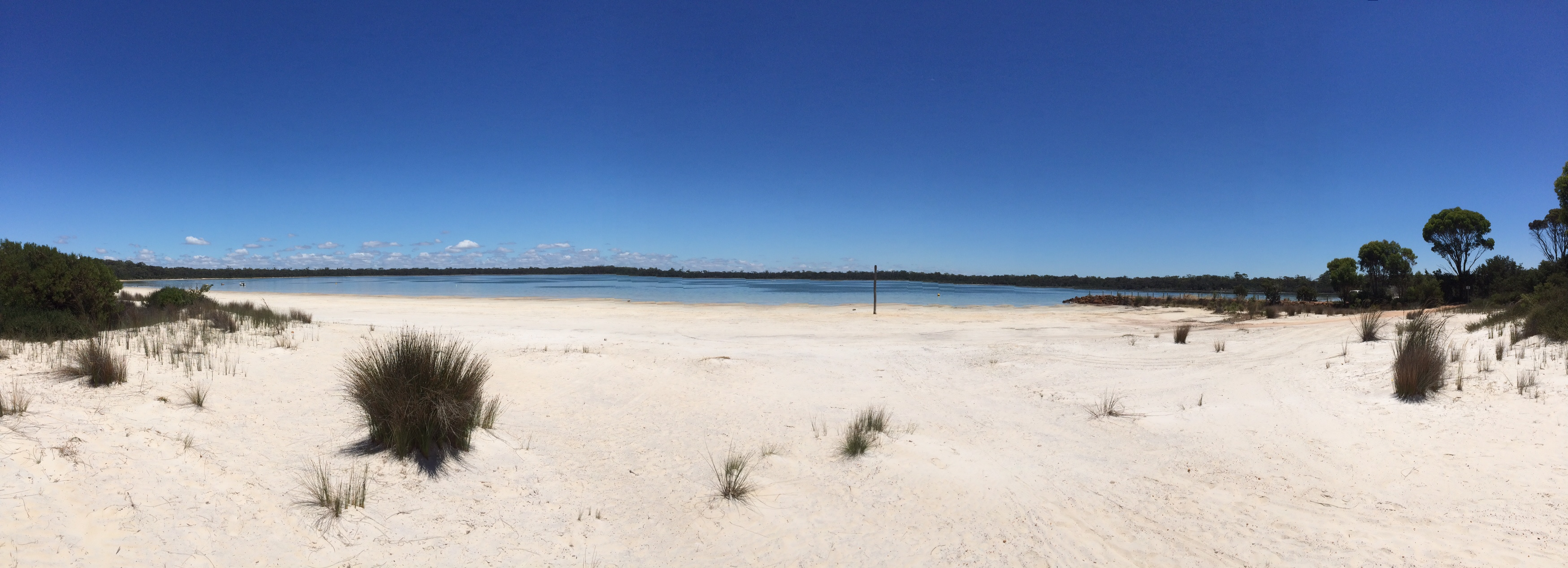
- Lake Poorrarecup December 2018

- Location in Western Australia
- Interactive map of Lake Poorrarecup
- Location: Western Australia
- Coordinates: 34°25′16″S 117°13′37″E
- Type: saline
- Catchment area: 94 km^{2} (36 sq mi)
- Basin countries: Australia
- Max. length: 1.85 km (1.15 mi)
- Max. width: 1.45 km (0.90 mi)
- Surface area: 1.99 km^{2} (0.77 sq mi)
- Average depth: 3 m (9.8 ft) maximum
- Shore length^{1}: 5.1 km (3.2 mi)
- Islands: none
- ^{1} Shore length is not a well-defined measure.

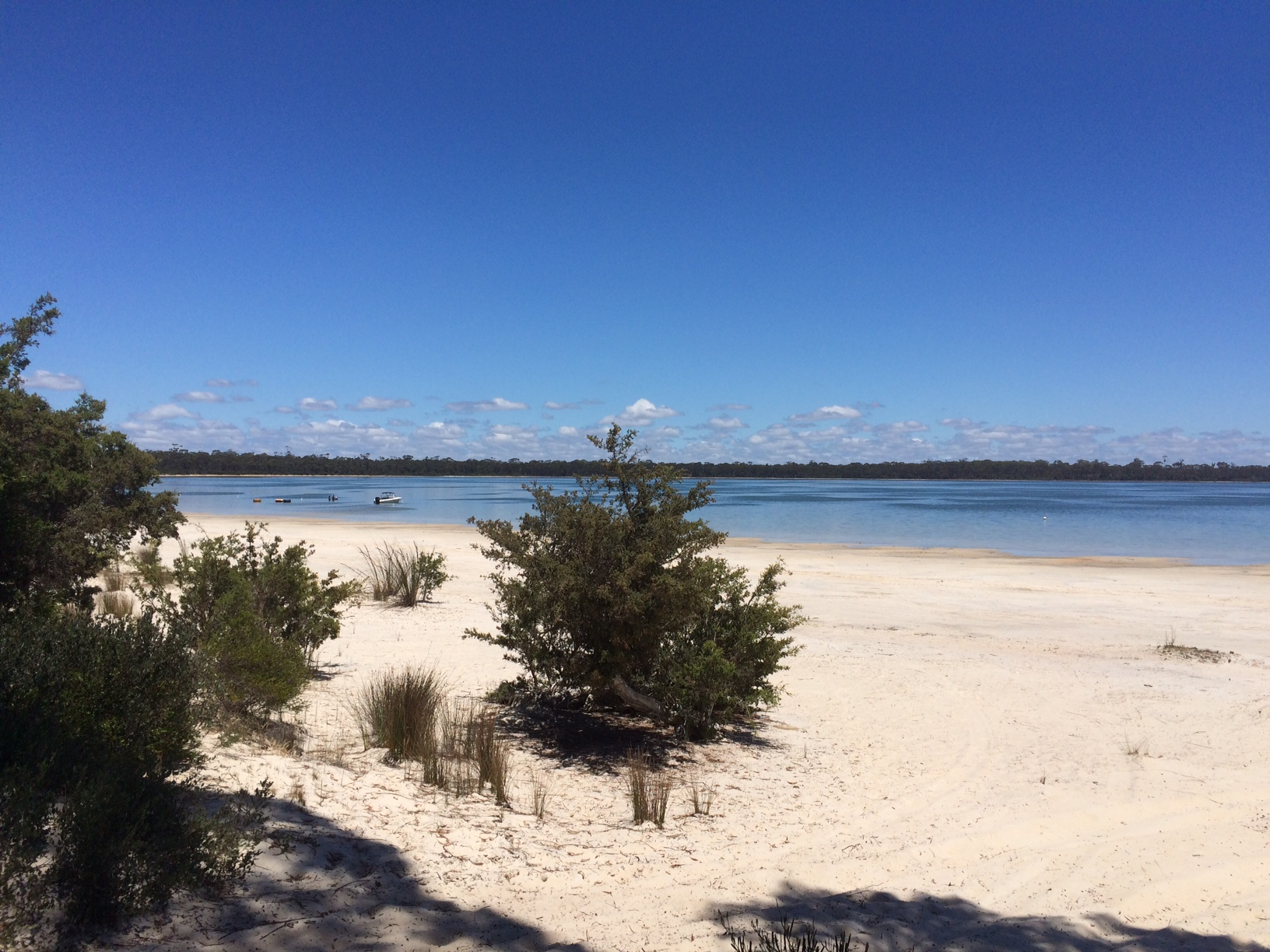
Lake Poorrarecup western shore

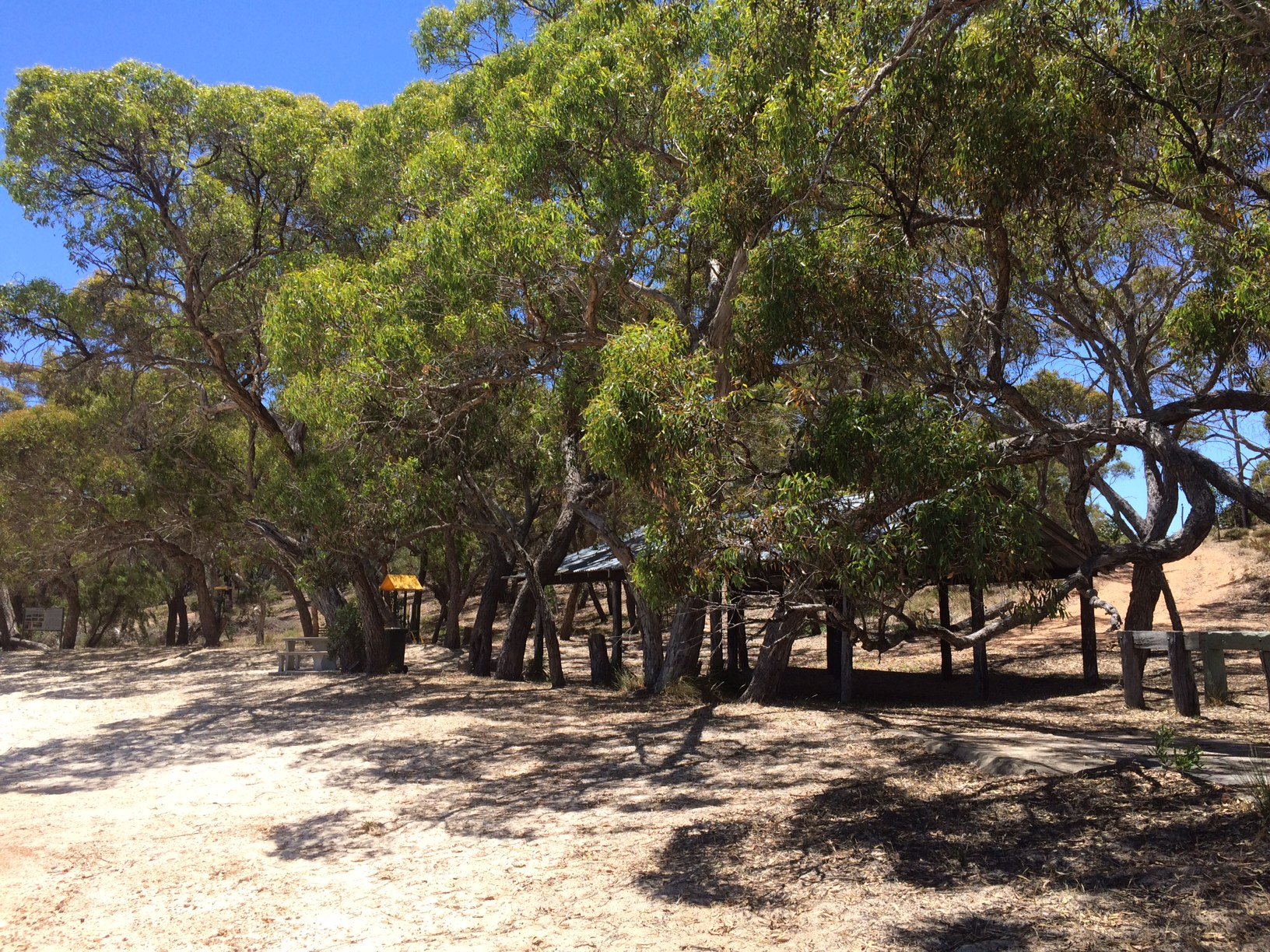
Lake Poorrarecup fringing vegetation

Lake Poorrarecup, also known as Poorarecup Lagoon, is an ephemeral salt lake in the Great Southern region of Western Australia, approximately 34 km (21 mi) south west of Cranbrook and 65 km (40 mi) north west of Mount Barker. It is located in a watershed between the Kent River and Frankland River catchments and the Gordon River, a tributary of the Frankland.

== Description ==
The lake was once freshwater but became saline by 1967 as a result of deforestation within the catchment area and lower rainfall. It has a surface area of 1.99 km^{2} (0.77 sq mi), and holds 4.98 GL (176,000,000 cu ft) with a maximum depth of 3 m (9.8 ft) at full capacity. The catchment area occupies an area of approximately 94 km^{2} (36 sq mi) but only 59 km^{2} (23 sq mi) drains directly into the lake. The remainder drains into a number of smaller seasonal lakes and swamps further downstream with a total area of 3.8 km^{2} (1.5 sq mi). The lake has a roughly circular shape and is on the remnants of a plateau at an elevation of 225 m (738 ft). The salinity of the water over the past couple of decades has been 10,500 mg/L. The lake is sustained by rainfall and groundwater inflow. It is part of an unfenced wetland vegetation buffer zone with a width of 38 to 350 m (125 to 1,148 ft) from the edge of the wetland.

== Catchment ==
The catchment area is flat or gently undulating, and few well-defined drainage courses are found. Surrounding catchments also have mature landforms but also have a degree of dissection with reasonably well defined drainage lines. Some of the surrounding lakes include Lake Matilda and Lake Balicup. The entire area is underlain by sediments of Tertiary or Quaternary age, which overlay Precambrian granites and migmatites. The low hills in the landscape are often capped with pisolitic laterite, but sandy lunettes, that were once ancient dunes, generally occur parallel to the lake margins.

The area recorded an average annual inflow of 2.65 GL (94,000,000 cu ft) between 1973 and 2001, with approximately 78% of the water evaporating. The lake has neither dried up nor overflowed in the past two decades.

=== Vegetation ===
Approximately 50% of the natural forests have been cleared for agricultural development. The native vegetation within the catchment area is predominantly jarrah (Eucalyptus marginata) woodlands with mixed jarrah, wandoo (Eucalyptus wandoo, and swamp yate Eucalyptus occidentalis) forest in more elevated and sandy areas. In the wide drainage lines and swampy part woodlands of paperbark (species of Melaleuca including Melaleuca cuticularis), Banksia species with sedge swamps are found. Sandy flats support woodlands with a mix of jarrah, marri (Eucalyptus calophylla), wandoo and swamp yate.

Ruppia megacarpa, a form a seagrass, is found on the floor of the lake and deposits of seagrass wrack are found on the shoreline.

== History ==
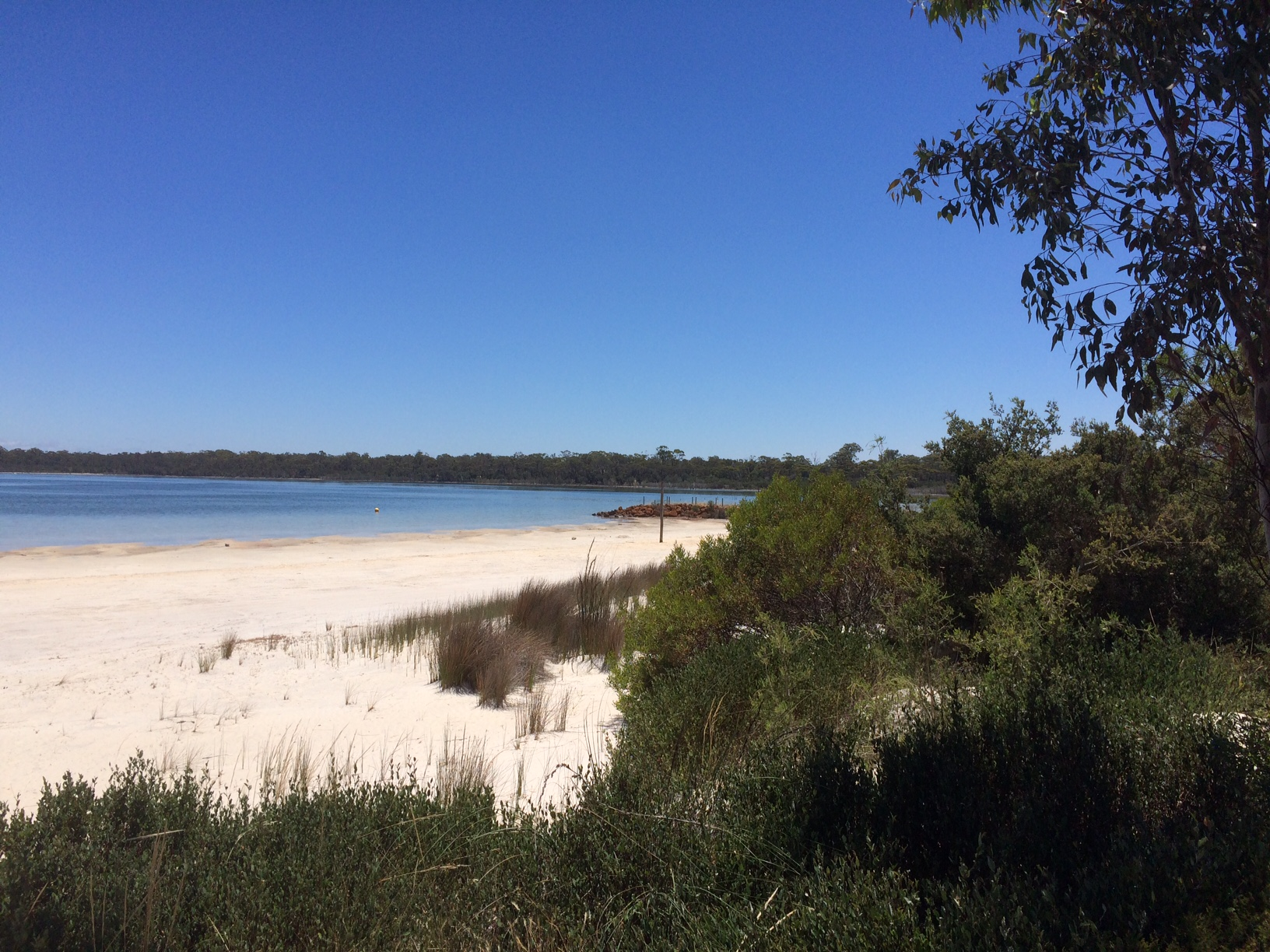
Lake Poorrarecup shore and boat ramp

The traditional owners of the area are the Noongar peoples, who have inhabited the region for tens of thousands of years.

Settlers arrived in the latter part of the 19th century, with large cattle leases being held in the area in the 1920s.

In 1959 women's changerooms and a playground were constructed on the margin of the lake, and a kiosk was built in 1961. New Year's Day picnics were regularly held at the site and in 163 over 2,500 people attended. Red perch were introduced into the lake in 1967. The Doris Haynes Memorial Park that surrounds part of the lake was opened in 1975 and the Junior Farmer's Club built a wall in the same year and fishing was permitted. The red perch were no longer found in the lake by 1977 as a result of salinity. In November 1999 comprehensive water quality monitoring commenced. In 2007 the Lake Poorrarecup Upgrade Committee was formed and the boat ramp was upgraded and new eco-toilets were installed.

The lake is the largest of over one hundred lakes and swamps within the Shire of Cranbrook, and is used as a recreational area during the warmer months for swimming and water skiing. Facilities at the site include changerooms, parking, sheltered areas and toilets. Camping is permitted around the lake but camping fees of A$20 per night per vehicle apply.

== See also ==
- List of lakes of Australia § Western Australia
