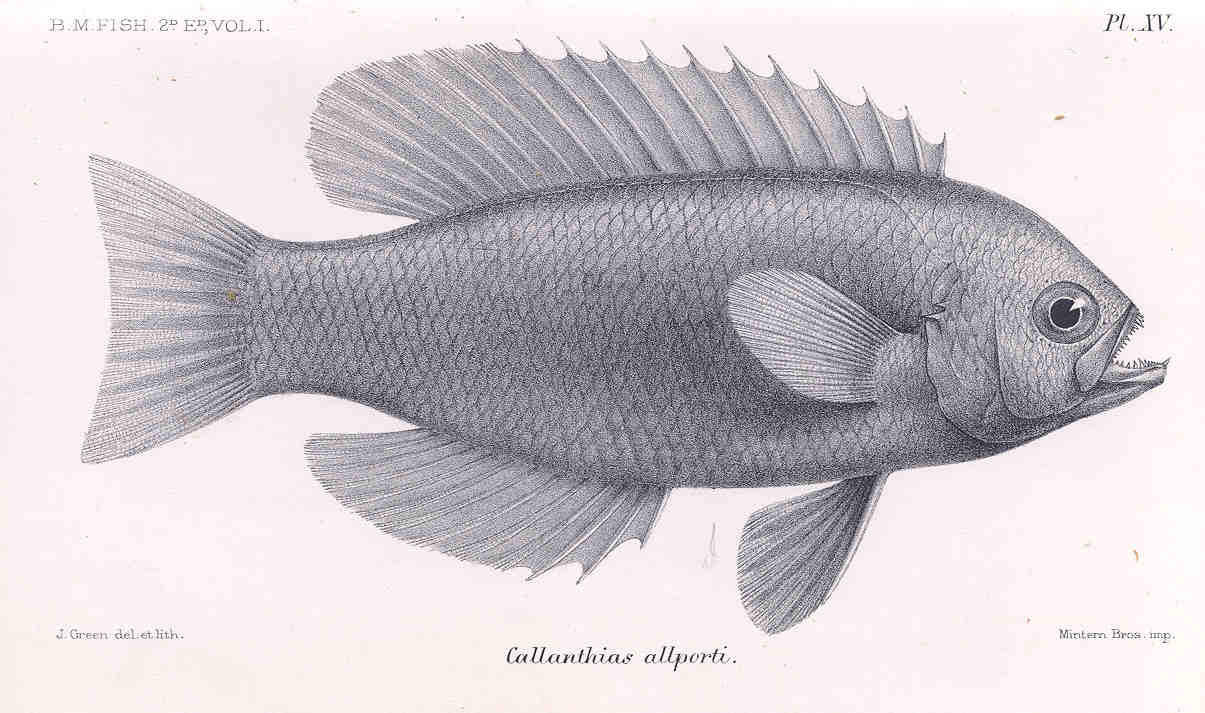

Scientific classification
- Kingdom: Animalia
- Phylum: Chordata
- Class: Actinopterygii
- Order: Acanthuriformes
- Family: Callanthiidae
- Genus: Callanthias
- Species: C. allporti

Binomial name
- Callanthias allporti Günther, 1876

= Splendid sea perch =

Species of fish

The splendid sea perch (Callanthias allporti), also called the rosy perch, Allport's groppo, Allport's perch, Southern goldie or Southern splendid perch is a species of marine ray-finned fish belonging to the family Callanthiidae. This fish is found off southern Australia and New Zealand.

== Taxonomy ==
Callanthias allporti was first formally described in 1876 by the German-born British herpetologist and ichthyologist Albert Günther with its type locality given as Tasmania. The genus Callanthias is one of two classified in the family Callanthiidae which the 5th edition of Fishes of the World classifies in the order Spariformes.

== Etymology ==
The Splendid sea perch has the specific name allporti which honours the British born lawyer and naturalist Morton Allport who presented two specimens of this species to the British Museum (Natural History).

== Description ==
The splendid sea perch has its dorsal fin supported by 11 spines and 10 soft rays while the anal fin is supported by 3 spines and 10, occasionally 9, soft rays. The spines in the dorsal fin increase in length towards the tail. The body is slender with a blunt snout. The caudal fin varies in shape from emarginate to lunate with the adults growing long filaments on the lobes. The overall colour is pink with an iridescent blue eye with patches of yellow on the chin, throat and the base of the pectoral fins, the upper and lower lobes of the caudal fin are also yellowish. There is some variation in colour and some specimens may be completely reddish orange. This species has a maximum published total length of 30 cm (12 in).

== Distribution and habitat ==
The splendid sea perch is found in the southwestern Pacific Ocean and the eastern Indian Ocean. In Australian waters its range extends from Seal Rocks in New South Wales south to Victoria and Tasmania. Records in Western Australia are thought to be misidentifications of C. australis. This species has also been recorded off Norfolk Island in the Tasman Sea. In New Zealand this species is found the Bay of Islands to Snares Islands and around the Chatham Islands. It is found near inshore rocky reefs at depths between 20 and 100 m (66 and 328 ft) using caves and crevices for sheltering at night or from threats.

== Behaviour ==
The splendid sea perch feeds on zooplankton above the bottom on reefs in shallower waters, often forming mixed shoals with the butterfly perch (Caesioperca lepidoptera). Callanthis species appear to be protogynous hermaphrodites and the grow of the filaments on the caudal fin may be related to females changing to males.
