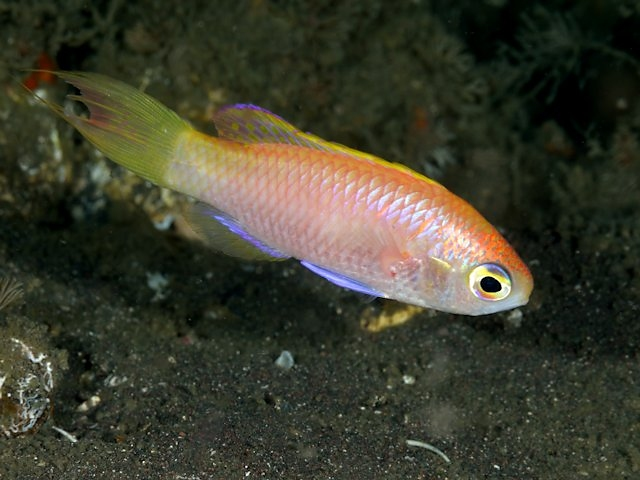
- Grammatonotus surugaensis

Scientific classification
- Kingdom: Animalia
- Phylum: Chordata
- Class: Actinopterygii
- Order: Acanthuriformes
- Family: Callanthiidae
- Genus: Grammatonotus; C. H. Gilbert, 1905

Type species
- Grammatonotus laysanus C. H. Gilbert, 1905

Synonyms
- Parabarossia Kotthaus, 1976; Zabulon Whitley, 1928

= Grammatonotus =

Genus of fishes

Grammatonotus is a genus of marine ray-finned fishes belonging to the family Callanthiidae, which includes the splendid perches and groppos. These fishes are found in the Indian and Pacific Ocean. All of the species in the genus are known in English as groppos.

== Taxonomy ==
Grammatonotus was first proposed as a monospecific genus in 1905 by the American ichthyologist Charles Henry Gilbert when he described the new species Grammatonotus laysanus, its type locality given as near Laysan Island in the Leeward Hawaiian Islands, which he also designated as the type species of the new genus. He also placed the genus in the family Serranidae while other workers classified it in the Grammatidae. In 1981 Pierre Fourmanoir erected the family Callanthiidae for this genus and Callanthias. The 5th edition of Fishes of the World classifies Grammatonotus as one of two genera in the family Callanthiidae, which it places in the order Spariformes.

== Etymology ==
Grammatonotus is a combination of grammatos, which means "line", and notus, meaning "back", an allusion to the lateral line which runs along the base of the dorsal fin.

== Species ==
There are currently 11 recognized species in this genus:

- Grammatonotus ambiortus Prokofiev, 2006
- Grammatonotus bianchi Lisher, Thein & Psomadakis, 2021 (Myanmar groppo)
- Grammatonotus brianne W. D. Anderson, Greene & L. A. Rocha, 2016 (Batangas groppo)
- Grammatonotus crosnieri (Fourmanoir, 1981) (Crosnier's groppo or Uncle Phoo's groppo)
- Grammatonotus lanceolatus (Kotthaus, 1976)
- Grammatonotus laysanus C. H. Gilbert, 1905
- Grammatonotus macrophthalmus Katayama, Yamamoto & Yamakawa, 1982
- Grammatonotus pelipel Anderson & Johnson 2017 (Barred groppo)
- Grammatonotus roseus (Günther, 1880) (Rosy groppo)
- Grammatonotus surugaensis Katayama, Yamakawa & K. Suzuki, 1980
- Grammatonotus xanthostigma Anderson & Johnson 2017 (Yellowspot groppo)

There are a number of potentially undescribed species that have been recorded from the Montebello Islands in Western Australia, the Coral Sea, and elsewhere in the Indian and Pacific Oceans.

== Characteristics ==
Grammatonotus groppos are ovoid to elongated in shape, with short, rounded snouts. The anterior nostril is tubular. They have large teeth with one to two canine teeth on each side. The scales are large. The tail is nearly truncate, forked or diamond-shaped with the central rays extending beyond the membrane or having a ragged appearance as many rays extend beyond the membrane. The caudal fin lobes may also be extended. The species in the genus Grammatonotus differ from those in the genus Callanthias in having a single spine on the operculum compared to two. They typically have 9 soft rays, infrequently 8 or 10, in the dorsal fin compared to a typical count of 10 or 11, infrequently 9 or 12, in Callanthias. Grammatonotus species typically have 9, rarely 10 or 11, soft rays in the anal fin while Callanthias species normally have 10 or 11, sometimes 9 or 12. This genus has 13 branched rays in the caudal fin, whereas there are 15 such rays in Callanthias. The number of tubed scales in the lateral line is also different with between 14 and 23 in this genus and between 21 and 47 in Callanthias. These are rather small fishes with the largest species being G. laysanus which has a maximum published standard length of 12.8 cm (5.0 in).

== Distribution ==
Grammatonotus groppos are found in the Indo-Pacific and are absent from the Atlantic Ocean, they are mainly found offshore from islands rather than continental coasts.
