= Callanthias platei =

Scientific classification
- Kingdom: Animalia
- Phylum: Chordata
- Class: Actinopterygii
- Order: Acanthuriformes
- Family: Callanthiidae
- Genus: Callanthias
- Species: C. platei

Binomial name
- Callanthias platei Steindachner, 1898

Species of fish

Callanthias latei, the Juan Fernandez splendid perch or San Félix groppo, is a species of marine ray-finned fish belonging to the family Callanthiidae, the splendid perches and groppos. This species is found in the southeastern Pacific Ocean.
