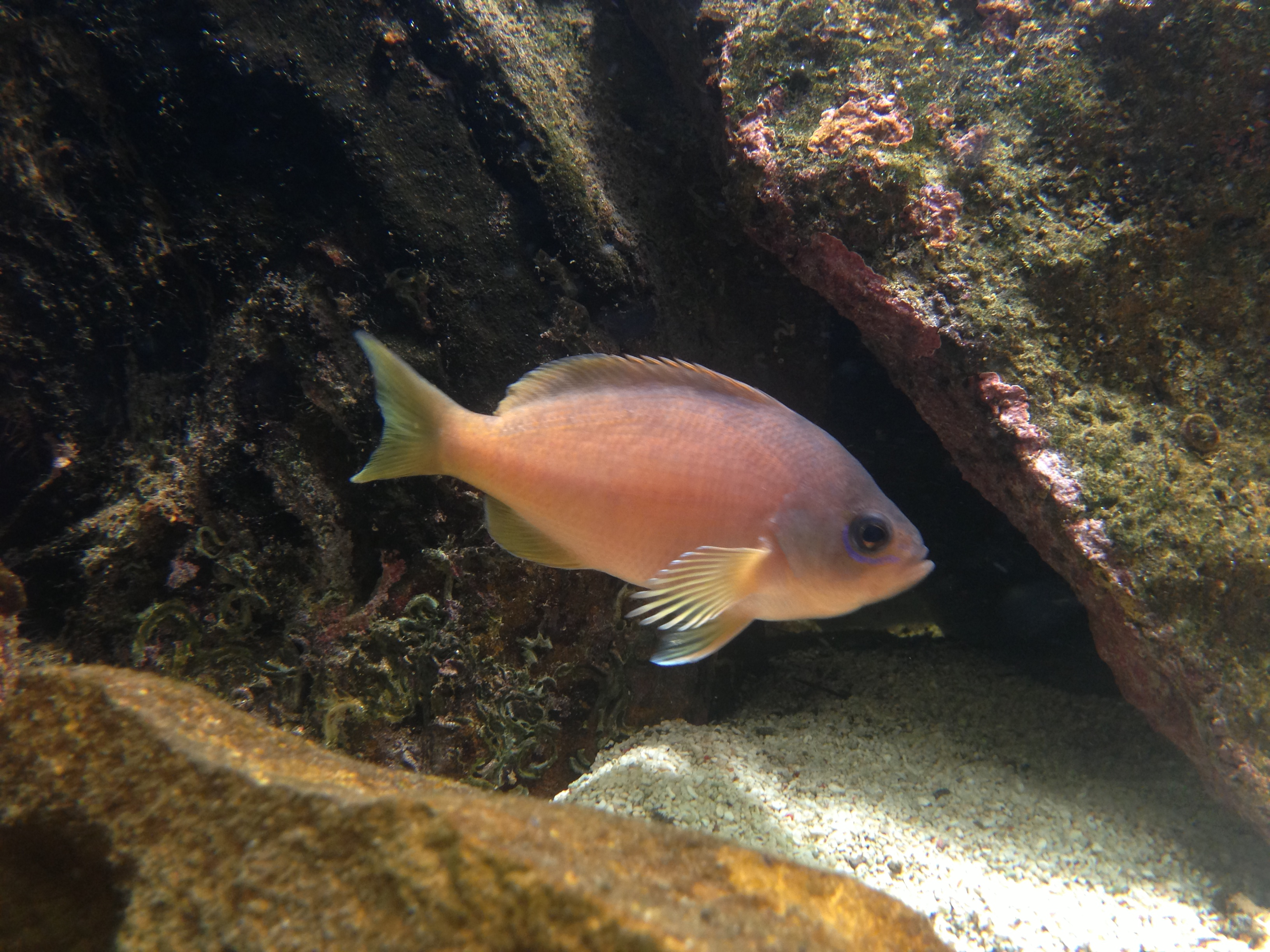

Scientific classification
- Kingdom: Animalia
- Phylum: Chordata
- Class: Actinopterygii
- Order: Perciformes
- Family: Anthiadidae
- Genus: Caesioperca
- Species: C. rasor

Binomial name
- Caesioperca rasor (Richardson, 1839)

Synonyms
- Anthias rasor Klunzinger, 1872; Lacepedia cataphracta Castelnau, 1873; Serranus rasor Richardson, 1839

= Barber perch =

Species of fish

The barber perch (Caesioperca rasor), also called the barber sea perch, red perch or Tasmanian barber, is endemic to Australia, found from southern Victoria to southwestern Western Australia, including Tasmania.

== Description ==
The barber perch is a laterally compressed, deep-bodied fish growing to a maximum length of 26 cm (10 in). Females and larger juveniles are a pinkish colour with a large black vertical bar on the flank towards the posterior end and a blue streak just under the eye. Smaller juveniles additionally have a black head. Males are similarly marked but their overall hue is silvery or yellowish. They additionally have blue margins to the fins and a small blue spot on each scale.

It differs from the closely related Butterfly perch by having a more slender body and males are more blue with a darker bar, rather than blotch, on the side. The two species sometimes form mixed shoals.

== Behaviour ==
The barber perch is a schooling species of fish which forms dense shoals at depths down to about 180 m (591 ft). It is largely a piscivore.
