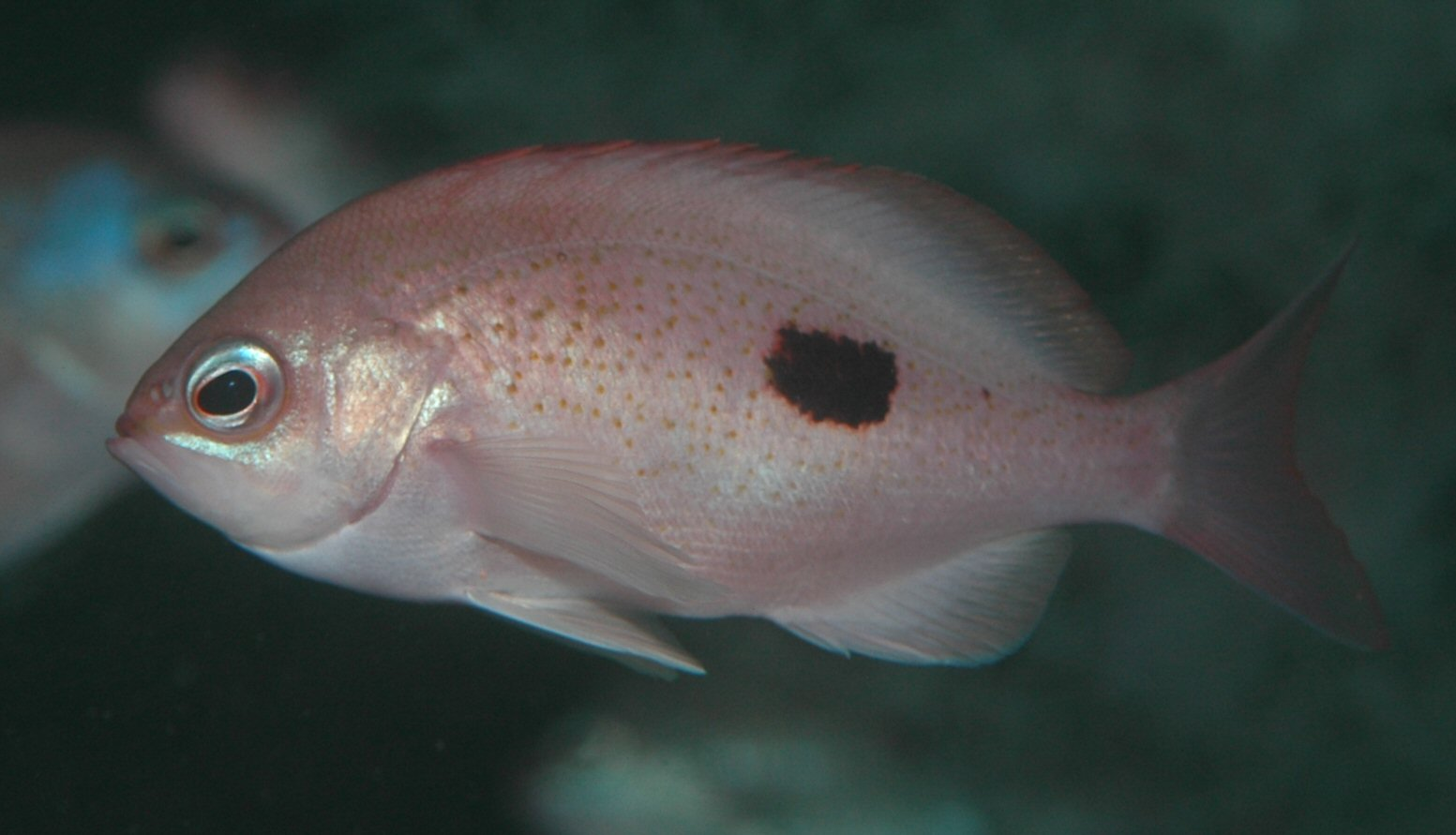

Scientific classification
- Domain: Eukaryota
- Kingdom: Animalia
- Phylum: Chordata
- Class: Actinopterygii
- Order: Perciformes
- Family: Anthiadidae
- Genus: Caesioperca
- Species: C. lepidoptera

Binomial name
- Caesioperca lepidoptera (Forster, 1801)

Synonyms
- Anthias richardsonii Günther, 1869; Epinephelus lepidopterus Forster, 1801

= Butterfly perch =

Species of ray-finned fish

The butterfly perch (Caesioperca lepidoptera) is a marine species of ray-finned fish in the family Anthiadidae. It is found in the eastern Indian Ocean, and the southwestern Pacific Ocean, including the waters around southern Australia and New Zealand. It is sometimes known as the red perch.

== Description ==
The butterfly perch is a laterally compressed, deep-bodied fish growing to a maximum length of 47 cm (19 in). It is a pinkish colour and has a large black spot towards the posterior end. Adults have a blue band just behind the eye, blue margins to the fins and small blue spots. The pectoral fins are about as long as the head. This fish is often confused with the closely related barber perch (Caesioperca rasor). However, the butterfly perch has a deeper body, and males are more pink with a dark blotch rather than band on the side.

== Distribution and habitat ==
The butterfly perch is found in the temperate waters around Australia and New Zealand at depths down to about 100 m (328 ft). In Australia it mainly occurs along the coasts of Western Australia, South Australia, Victoria, Tasmania and New South Wales. It is a schooling fish and is found on and around coastal reefs where it feeds on plankton. The butterfly perch shelters in crevices and caves at night.

== Behaviour ==
The butterfly perch congregates in dense shoals in deep water near reefs. It is a demersal fish, feeding on planktonic organisms and such bottom-dwelling invertebrates as sea squirts, pyrosomes, coral polyps, polychaete worms, copepods and shrimps.
