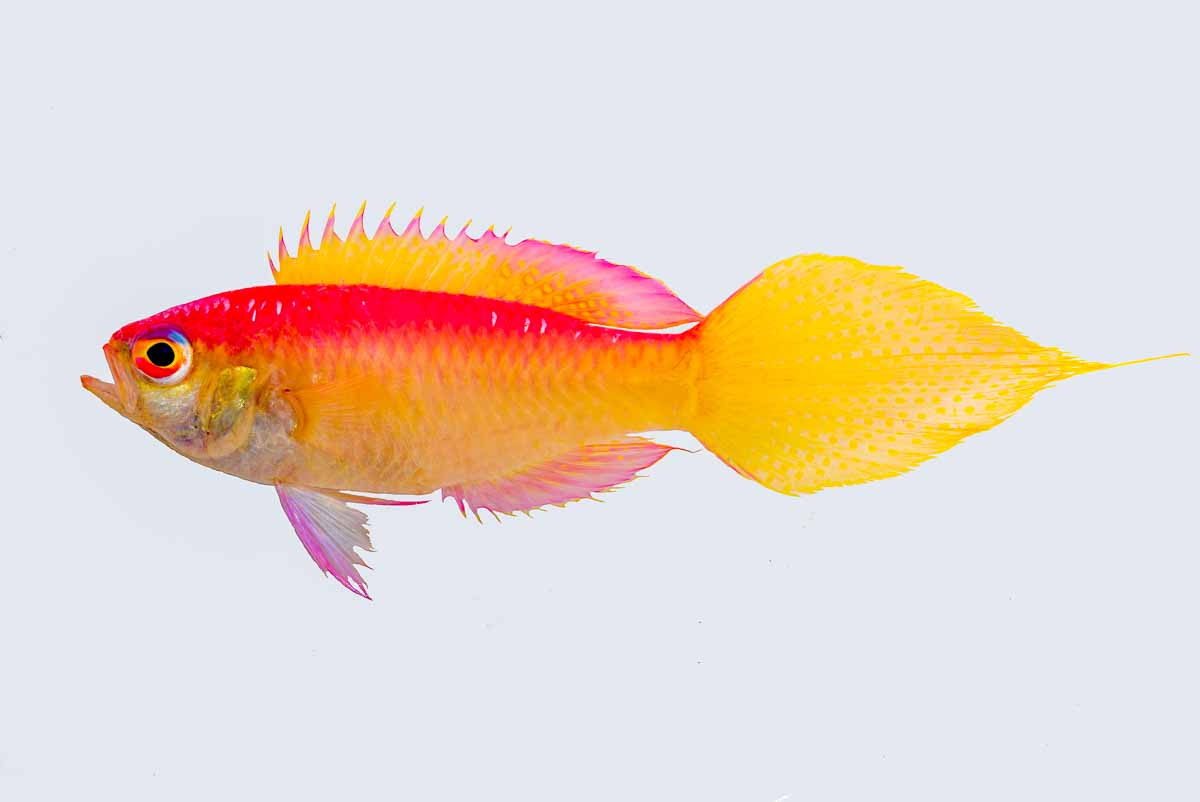
- Grammatonotus brianne

Scientific classification
- Kingdom: Animalia
- Phylum: Chordata
- Class: Actinopterygii
- Order: Acanthuriformes
- Family: Callanthiidae; Fowler, 1907

Genera
- See text

= Callanthiidae =

Family of ray-finned fishes

Callanthiidae, the splendid perches and groppos is a small family of marine ray-finned fishes in the order Spariformes. These fishes are mainly found in the Indo-Pacific but two species are found in the eastern Atlantic and Mediterranean.

== Taxonomy ==
Callanthiidae was first proposed as a family name in 1907 by the American zoologist Henry Weed Fowler. This family was classified in the order Perciformes but the 5th edition of Fishes of the World classifies the family within the order Spariformes, although states that there is some doubt about the family's exact classification. Other workers have classified the family as incertae sedis within the series Eupercaria.

== Etymology ==
Callianthiidae, takes its name from Callianthias its type genus. Callianthias is a combination of callos, meaning "beautiful", and Anthias a genus in the family Serranidae. Lowe named the genus this because he described its type species, Callanthias paradisaeus, as "a most elegant little fish" and "almost as rare as beautiful" and noted the resemblance on form and dentition to Anthias.

== Genera ==
Callanthiidae is divided into two genera:

- Callanthias Lowe, 1839
- Grammatonotus Gilbert, 1905

== Characteristics ==
The Callanthiidae are characterised by a flat nasal organ, lacking any lamellae. The lateral line runs along the base of the dorsal fin and ends close to the end of that fin or it extends on to the caudal peduncle. The dorsal fin is supported by 11 spines and between 9 and 11 soft rays. There is a midlateral row of modified scales with a series of pits and sometimes grooves. These splendidly coloured fish have a maximum total length of 30 cm (12 in), the largest species being the splendid sea perch (Callianthias allporti).

== Distribution ==
The Callanthiidae are mostly found in the Indo-Pacific region as far east as Hawaii. Two species are found in the eastern Atlantic and Mediterranean.
