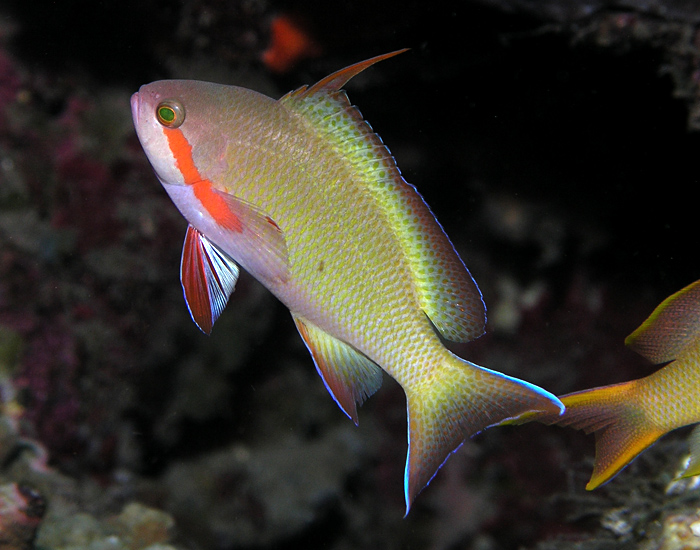

Conservation status
- Least Concern (IUCN 3.1)

Scientific classification
- Kingdom: Animalia
- Phylum: Chordata
- Class: Actinopterygii
- Order: Perciformes
- Family: Anthiadidae
- Genus: Pseudanthias
- Species: P. huchtii

Binomial name
- Pseudanthias huchtii (Bleeker, 1857)

Synonyms
- Anthias huchtii Bleeker, 1857; Anthias mortoni Macleay, 1883

= Pseudanthias huchtii =

Species of fish

Pseudanthias huchtii, the red cheek fairy basslet, threadfin anthias or Pacific basslet is a species of marine ray-finned fish, a member of the genus Pseudanthias which is part of the subfamily Anthiinae, which in turn is part of the family Serranidae, the groupers and sea basses. It comes from the Western Central Pacific Ocean. It occasionally makes its way into the aquarium trade. It grows to a size of 12 cm in length.

== Description ==
Pseudanthis huchti is a very distinctively colour member of the genus Pseudanthias, as well as having the third dorsal fin spine and elongated caudal fin lobes. The males possess an obvious orange stripe which runs from their eye to the centre of their pectoral fin and a broad maroon band on the forward margin of the pelvic fin. The females and juveniles are greenish-yellow in colour. There are 10 spines in the dorsal fin and 17 soft rays while the anal fin contains 3 spines and 7 soft rays. The maximum recorded total length for a male is 12 centimetres (4.7 in) and for a female it is half that.

== Distribution ==
Pseudanthias huchtii is found in the Western Pacific Ocean from the Maluku Islands and the Philippines east to Vanuatu, south as far the Great Barrier Reef in the Tasman Sea, as well as the Scott Reef and the Ashmore Reefs in the Timor Sea their distribution extends as far east as Palau in Micronesia.

== Habitat and ecology ==
Pseudanthias huchtii is found in aggregations at drop offs around the outer crests of coral reefs. Like all species of Pseudanthias they are nonandric protogynous hermaphrodites in which all the fish are born female and the largest and most dominant females will change sex to become males. The males are territorial and guard a harem of females. They will interact with Pseudanthias squamipinnis.

== Taxonomy ==
Pseudanthias huchti was first formally described in 1857 as Anthias huchti by the Dutch ichthyologist and herpetologist Pieter Bleeker (1819–1874) with the type locality given as Ambon Island. Bleeker named this species in honour of Mr. G.J.L. van den Hucht of Batavia, who owned a fine collection of Moluccan fishes, and who gave specimens to Bleeker. Some authorities place this species in the subgenus Franzia.

== Utlisation ==
This is an aggressive species and infrequently appears in the aquarium trade.
