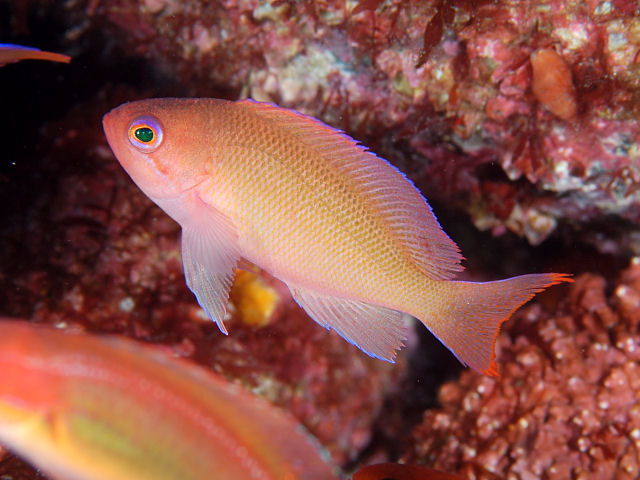

Conservation status
- Least Concern (IUCN 3.1)

Scientific classification
- Kingdom: Animalia
- Phylum: Chordata
- Class: Actinopterygii
- Order: Perciformes
- Family: Anthiadidae
- Genus: Pseudanthias
- Species: P. hypselosoma

Binomial name
- Pseudanthias hypselosoma (Bleeker, 1878)

Synonyms
- Anthias hypselosoma (Bleeker, 1878); Anthias truncatus Katayama & H. Masuda, 1983; Pseudanthias truncatus (Katayama & Masuda, 1983)

= Pseudanthias hypselosoma =

Species of fish

Pseudanthias hypselosoma is a species of marine ray-finned fish, a member of the genus Pseudanthias which is part of the subfamily Anthiinae, which in turn is part of the family Serranidae, the groupers and sea basses. It is an Indo-Pacific species which is found from the Maldives to Samoa, north to the Ryukyu Islands and south to the Great Barrier Reef. It occasionally makes its way into the aquarium trade. It grows to a size of 19 cm (7.5 in) in length.
