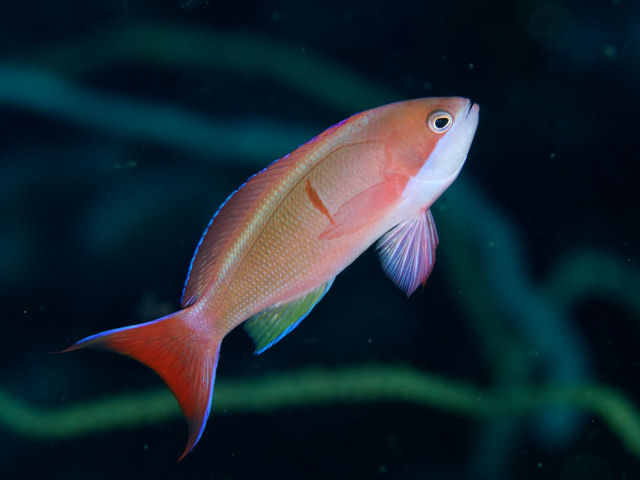

Conservation status
- Least Concern (IUCN 3.1)

Scientific classification
- Kingdom: Animalia
- Phylum: Chordata
- Class: Actinopterygii
- Order: Perciformes
- Family: Anthiadidae
- Genus: Pseudanthias
- Species: P. cooperi

Binomial name
- Pseudanthias cooperi (Regan, 1902)

Synonyms
- Anthias cooperi Regan, 1902; Leptanthias kashiwae Tanaka, 1918; Anthias kashiwae (Tanaka, 1918); Pseudanthias kashiwae (Tanaka, 1918); Planctanthias preopercularis Fowler, 1935

= Pseudanthias cooperi =

Species of fish

Pseudanthias cooperi, the red-bar anthias is a Pseudanthias fish from the Indo-Pacific Ocean that occasionally makes its way into the aquarium trade. It grows to a size of 14 cm in length.

== Etymology ==
The identity of the person honoured in the specific name is not specified in Regan's account but it is thought to be Clive Forster Cooper (1880-1947), who was a member of the expedition on which the type was collected in the Maldives.
