= Pseudanthias fucinus =

Scientific classification
- Kingdom: Animalia
- Phylum: Chordata
- Class: Actinopterygii
- Order: Perciformes
- Family: Anthiadidae
- Genus: Pseudanthias
- Species: P. fucinus

Binomial name
- Pseudanthias fucinus (Randall and Ralson, 1985)

Synonyms
- Anthias fucinus Randall and Ralston, 1985

Species of fish

Pseudanthias fucinus, the violet anthias, is a species of marine ray-finned fish in the family Anthiadidae. It is endemic to the Hawaiian Islands.
