= Pseudanthias heemstrai =

Scientific classification
- Kingdom: Animalia
- Phylum: Chordata
- Class: Actinopterygii
- Order: Perciformes
- Family: Anthiadidae
- Genus: Pseudanthias
- Species: P. heemstrai

Binomial name
- Pseudanthias heemstrai Schuhmacher, Krupp & J. E. Randall, 1989

Species of fish

Pseudanthias heemstrai, the orange-headed anthias, Heemstra's anthias or redhead anthias is a species of marine ray-finned fish in the genus Pseudanthias, the subfamily Anthiinae of the family Serranidae, the groupers and sea basses. It is endemic to the Red Sea. It occasionally makes its way into the aquarium trade. It grows to a size of 13 cm (5 inches) in length.

== Etymology ==
The fish was named in honor of ichthyologist Phil Heemstra, of the South African Institute for Aquatic Biodiversity, in recognition of his research on anthiine fishes.

== Description ==
Pseudanthias heemstrai has the typical elongate body shape of the anthias, the body being just under three times as long as it is deep. It has a large mouth in which the maxilla extends past the level of the centre of the eye and the lower jaw projects slightly beyond the upper jaw. The dorsal fin has 15-17 rays, while the anal fin has 7 rays and is enlarged and pointed in both sexes, reaching to beyond the caudal fin base. The caudal fin has a slightly truncate or emarginate margin in females. In males, this is convex or truncate, with some males having the lower rays exposed beyind the membrane. The males also have very elongated pelvic fins, which have their first two rays enlarged and may extend beyond the base of the anal fin.

The bodies of males are largely reddish above, with each scale having a yellow spot and a red edge. The sides of the head are dull orange, becoming reddish pink towards the top of the head, and the gill cover is golden. The lower parts of the head and the body are pale pink, with a scarlet streak on the middle of the throat. They have pale bluish grey anal and pelvic fins which have irregular yellow spotting. The caudal fin is dark red with a yellow or light blue-grey rear margin. When breeding, the pinkish red scale margins on the flanks of the males intensify to scarlet, and the yellow spot in the scale centres of the scales becomes darker. They also develop an irregular, diffuse, mid-lateral white band which starts to the rear of the gill cover and gradually becomes broader as it reaches the tail. This band is widest above the anal fin, where it covers the upper half of the base of the caudal fin and the caudal peduncle, creating an obvious white oval spot on the upper part of the caudal peduncle. This white band has also been observed on territorial males. There is a pale orange band running from the end of the upper mandible to the origin of the dorsal fin, and this intensifies to dark orange red in breeding males. When looked at from above, this band joins the folded dorsal fin to make an extended red band along the back. The rear margin of the caudal fin changes colour from whitish or yellow to bright red.

In females, the body is yellow towards the back, with lavender scales, each with a yellow spot in the centre. The lower half of the body is pale purple to white, with a red streak on the centre of the throat. The pectoral and pelvic fins pinkish-blue, while the rest of the fins are yellow. The maximum total length attained is 13 centimetres (5.1 in).

== Distribution ==
Pseudanthias heemstrai is endemic to the Red Sea, where it has been recorded in the Gulf of Aqaba, 5 kilometres (3.1 miles) north of Dahab and off the Red Sea coast of Yemen.

== Habitat and biology ==
The natural environment is fore-reef slopes where they form small loose aggregations. Usually they distribute at depths between 50 and about 200 feet (15 – 60 m), where they feed on zooplankton.

== Aquaculture ==
They can be maintained in aquaria with some rocky caves and strong water movement that has a large unencumbered area for schooling, which will occur in the upper third of this area. Tank mates of Pseudanthias heemstrai should be peaceful and all should be last to enter the aquarium. They can eat most regular aquarium foods, like finely chopped frozen or fresh meaty foods such as mysis, fish flesh, shrimp, squid, and clam. The diet should be offered at least twice a day and released into the upstream, so water currents carry food to their location. When they are difficult to get feeding, fortified live adult brine shrimp may be necessary for their diet until they accept other types of aquarium foods like fresh marine fish and invertebrate flesh.
