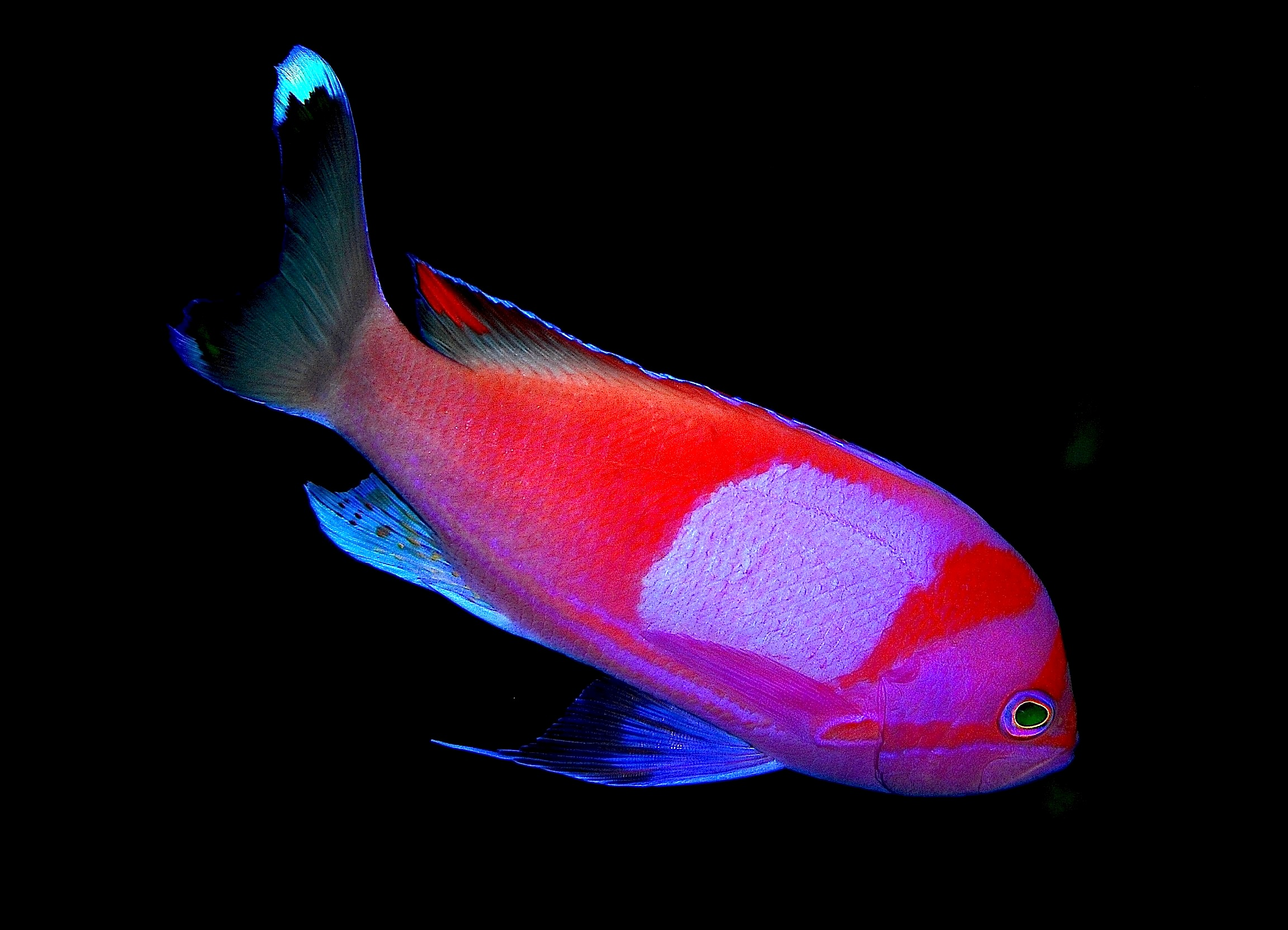
- Squarespot anthias, Pseudanthias pleurotaenia

Conservation status
- Least Concern (IUCN 3.1)

Scientific classification
- Kingdom: Animalia
- Phylum: Chordata
- Class: Actinopterygii
- Order: Perciformes
- Family: Anthiadidae
- Genus: Pseudanthias
- Species: P. pleurotaenia

Binomial name
- Pseudanthias pleurotaenia (Bleeker, 1857)

Synonyms
- Anthias pleurotaenia Bleeker, 1857

= Pseudanthias pleurotaenia =

Species of fish

Pseudanthias pleurotaenia also known as the squarespot anthias, pink square anthias, mirror basslet or squarespot fairy basslet is a species of marine ray-finned fish in the subfamily Anthiinae of the family Serranidae, the groupers and sea basses. This species of Pseudanthias is a reef dwelling fish of the Pacific Ocean. It occasionally makes its way into the aquarium trade and grows to a size of 20 cm in length. The males are deep pink and orange in colour with a large quadrilateral purplish blotch on the flank, a red tip on the posterior margin of the dorsal fin, the caudal fin lobes have mauve tips and there is a reddish stripe which runs from the snout through the eye and through the base of the pectoral fin to the base of the tail. Females and juveniles are yellowish in colour with orange edges to their scales and they have two purple stripes which run from the eye along the lower flanks to the base of the tail.

It is found around reefs at depths of 10 to 180 metres (33 to 591 ft).

Its range extends from Indonesia in the east, Samoa in the west, north to the Ryukyu Islands, and south to Rowley Shoals and New Caledonia, as well as throughout Micronesia.

As with many reef fish, it is a sequential hermaphrodite, beginning life as a female, and transitioning to male in response to environmental and social factors. The males and females normally occur sexually separate aggregations in the vicinity of drop-offs where there are strong currents, while the solitary juveniles stay close to shelter. Mixed sex aggregations are known.

== Gallery ==
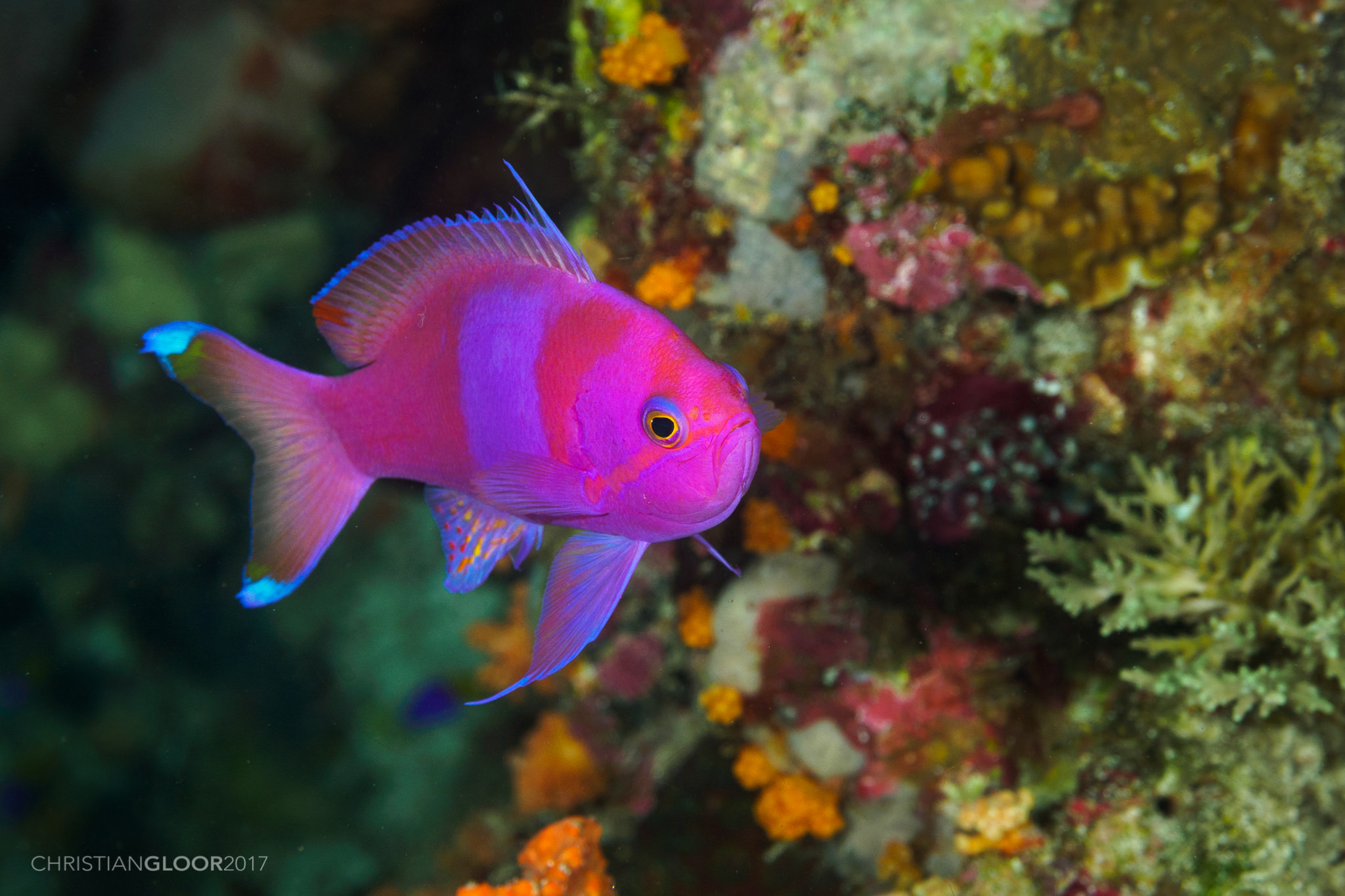
Male Pseudanthias pleurotaenia at Wakatobi National Park Indonesia, 2017

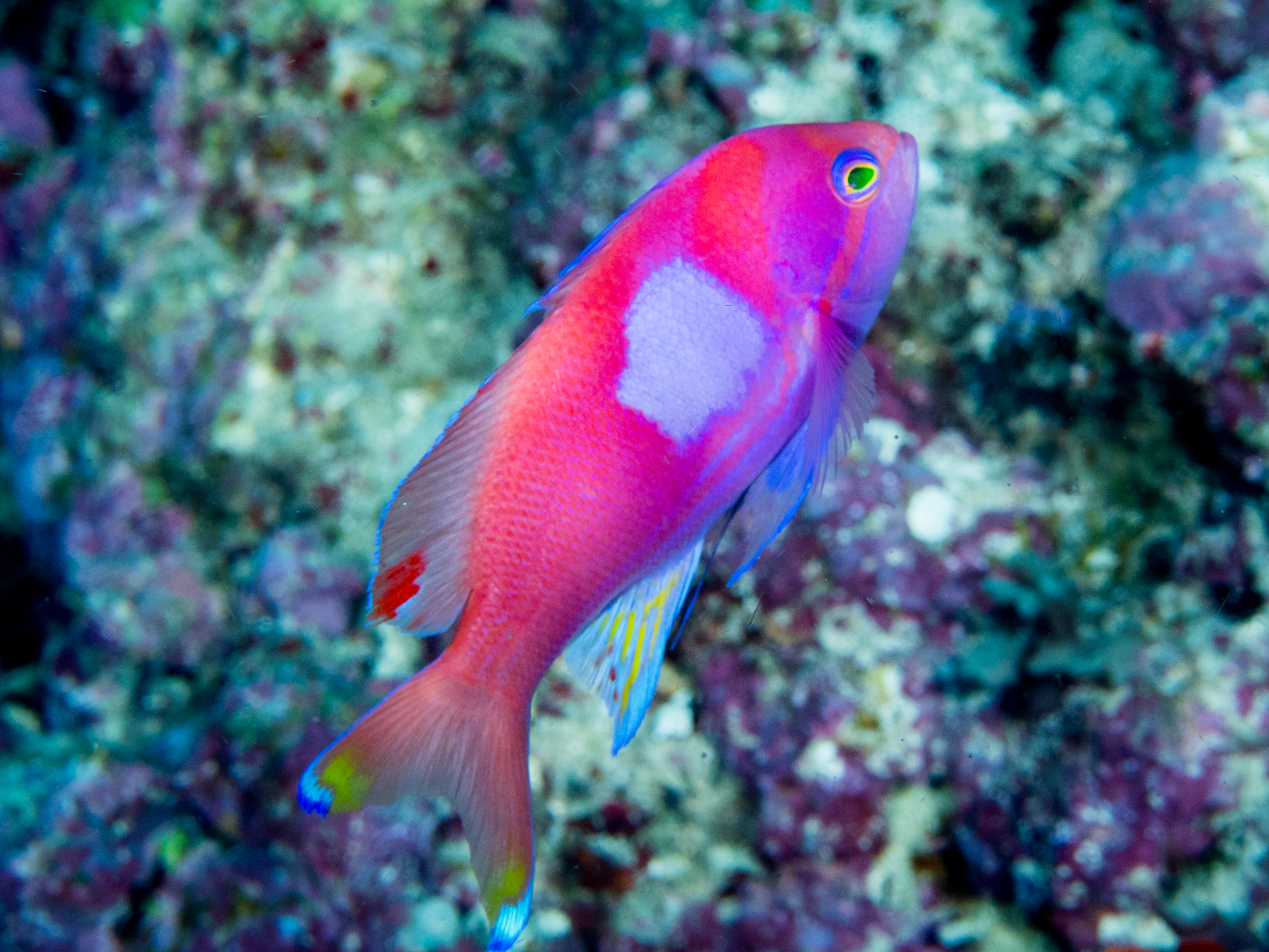
Male Pseudanthias pleurotaenia at Morotai North Maluku, 2018

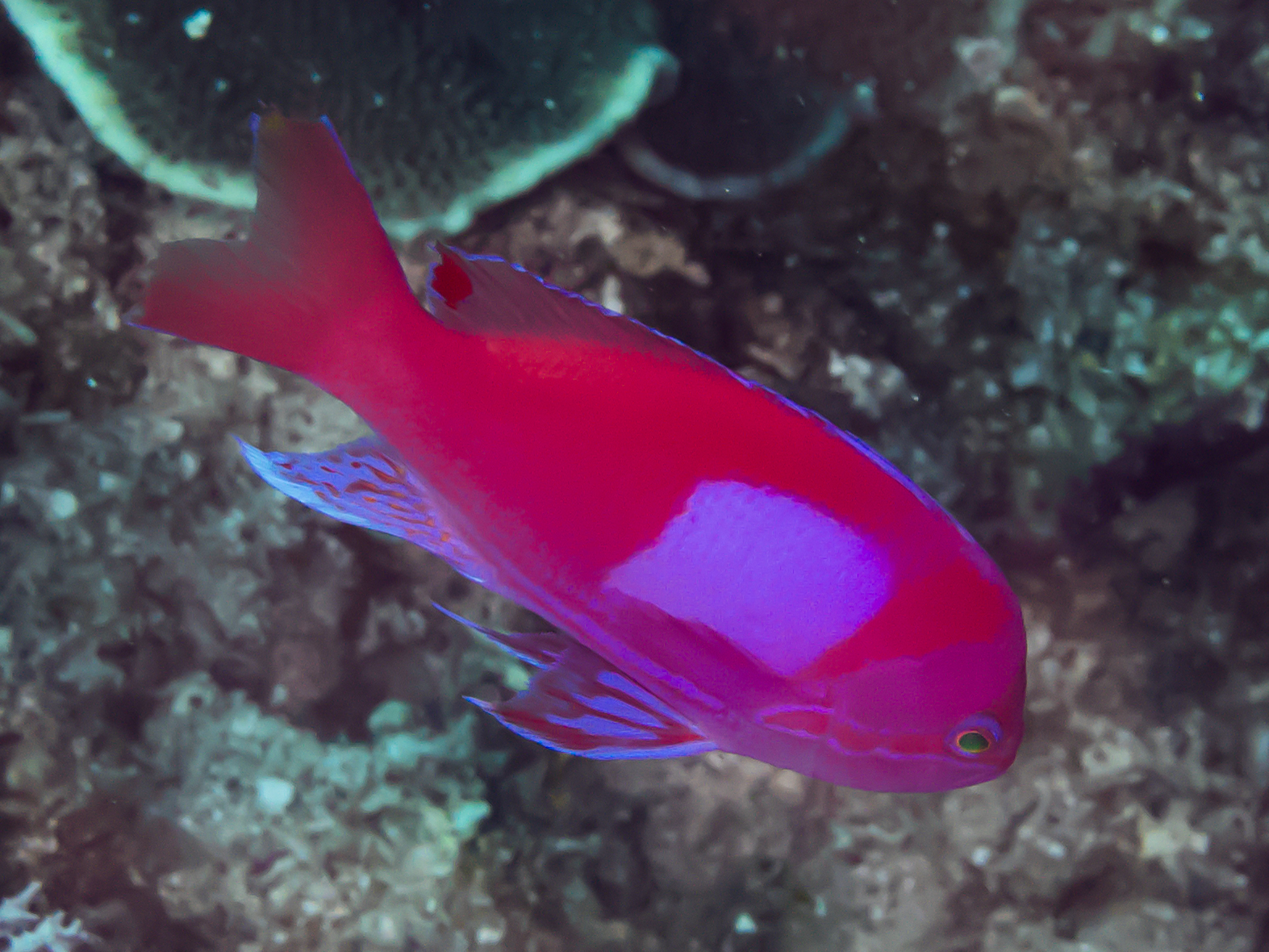
Male Pseudanthias pleurotaenia at Lembeh Sulawesi, 2018

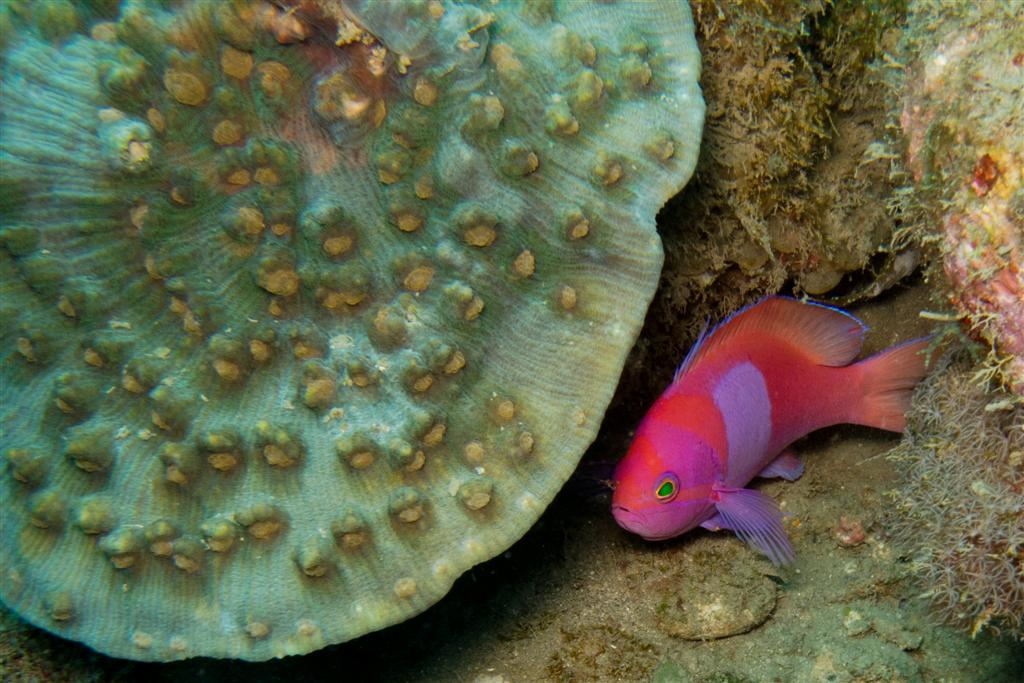
Male Pseudanthias pleurotaenia at Manatuto Municipality Timor Leste, 2011

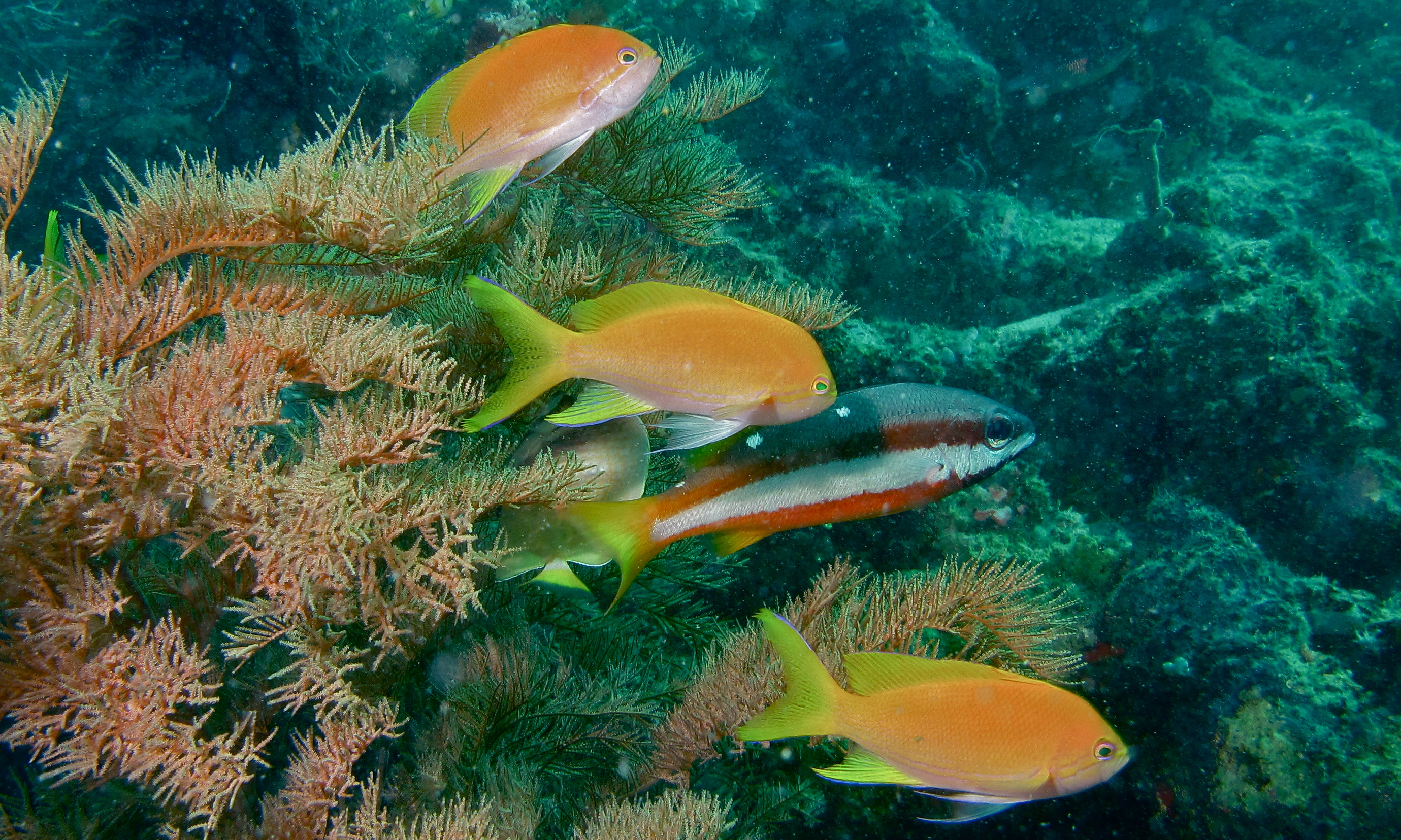
Female Pseudanthias pleurotaenia at Mabul, Sabah, MALAYSIA, 2010

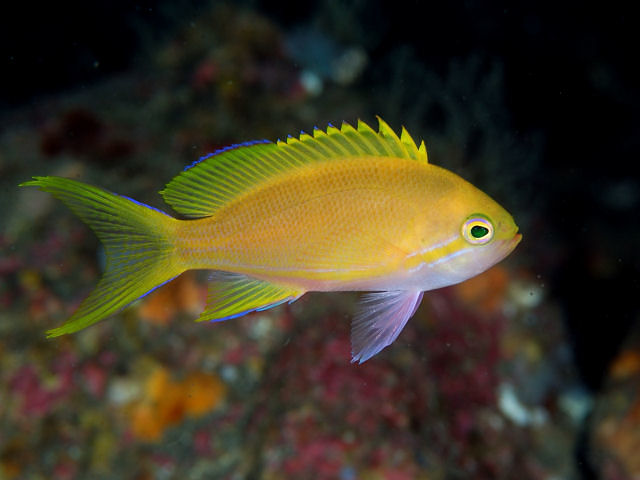
Female Pseudanthias pleurotaenia
