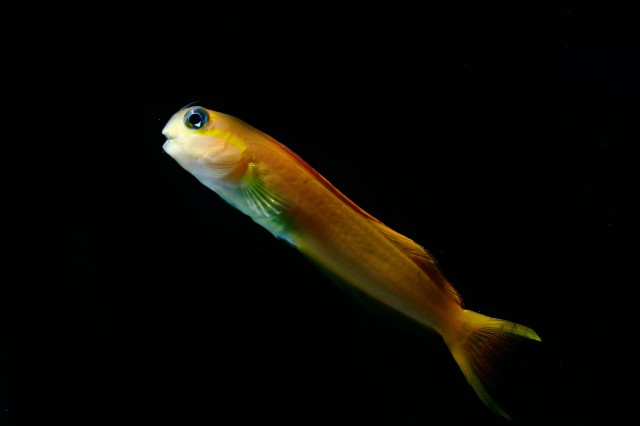

Conservation status
- Least Concern (IUCN 3.1)

Scientific classification
- Kingdom: Animalia
- Phylum: Chordata
- Class: Actinopterygii
- Division: Teleostei
- Order: Blenniiformes
- Family: Blenniidae
- Genus: Ecsenius
- Species: E. midas

Binomial name
- Ecsenius midas Starck, 1969

= Midas blenny =

Species of fish

Ecsenius midas, known commonly as the Midas blenny, Persian blenny, lyretail blenny or golden blenny, is a species of marine fish in the family Blenniidae.

The Midas blenny is widespread throughout the tropical waters of the Indo-Pacific area from the eastern coast of Africa, Red Sea included, to the Marquesan Islands. It occasionally makes its way into the aquarium trade. The specific name references the Phrygian king Midas who, in Greek mythology turned all he touched into gold, the type was a golden color in life although it is now known that this species is variable in color.

It grows to a size of 13 cm in length. Its normal color is golden orange but it can adapt its color (mimicry) to match the color of the fishes it mixes with. It shows a black spot near the anus. It is often seen in company of the lyretail anthias (Pseudanthias squamipinnis).

The Midas blenny is a planktivore.
