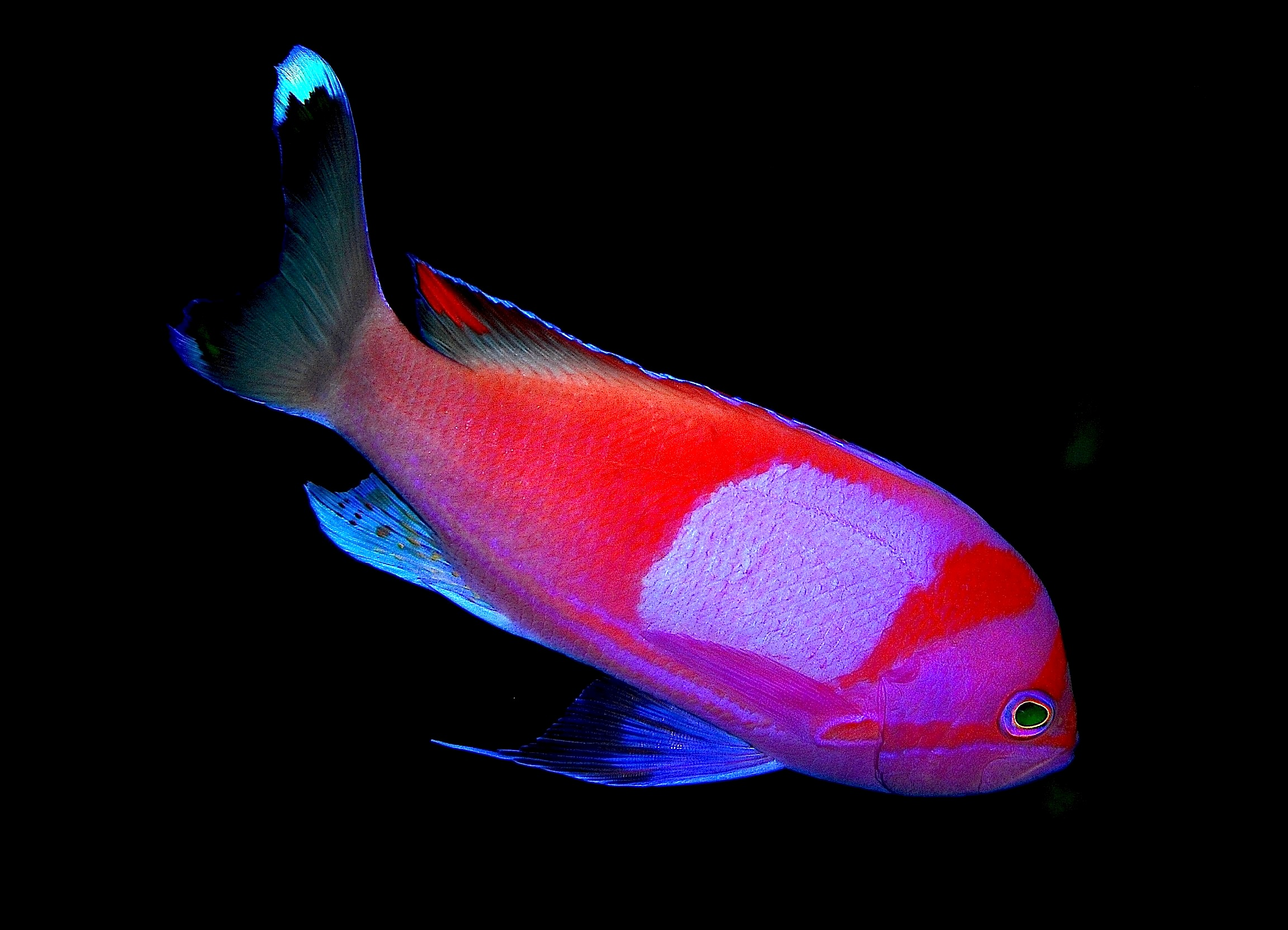
- Pseudanthias pleurotaenia

Scientific classification
- Kingdom: Animalia
- Phylum: Chordata
- Class: Actinopterygii
- Division: Teleostei
- Order: Perciformes
- Family: Anthiadidae
- Genus: Pseudanthias; Bleeker, 1871

Type species
- Anthias pleurotaenia Bleeker, 1857

Synonyms
- Entonanthias D.S. Jordan & Tanaka, 1927; Franzia D.S. Jordan, & W.F. Thompson, 1914; Leptanthias Tanaka, 1918; Planctanthias Fowler, 1935; Rosanthias Tanaka, 1917

= Pseudanthias =

Genus of fishes

Pseudanthias is a genus of colourful reef fishes of the subfamily Anthiinae, part of the family Serranidae, the groupers and sea basses. They are found in the Indo-Pacific. The species belonging to this genus have a diet consisting of zooplankton, and are haremic. Fishes currently included in this genus were earlier part of the genus Anthias. Pseudanthias is the largest anthiine genus

== Species ==
The following 49 species are recognized in the genus Pseudanthias:

- Pseudanthias bimaculatus (J. L. B. Smith, 1955) (Two-spot basslet)
- Pseudanthias calloura H. Ida & Sakaue, 2001 (Aurora anthias)
- Pseudanthias caudalis Kamohara & Katayama, 1959
- Pseudanthias charleneae G. R. Allen & Erdmann, 2008 (Charlene's anthias)
- Pseudanthias cheirospilos (Bleeker 1857)
- Pseudanthias cichlops (Bleeker, 1853)
- Pseudanthias connelli (Heemstra & J. E. Randall, 1986) (Harlequin goldie)
- Pseudanthias conspicuus (Heemstra, 1973)
- Pseudanthias cooperi (Regan, 1902) (Red-bar anthias)
- Pseudanthias elongatus (V. Franz, 1910)
- Pseudanthias emma Gill & Psomadakis 2018
- Pseudanthias engelhardi (G. R. Allen & Starck, 1982) (Orangebar anthias)
- Pseudanthias fasciatus (Kamohara, 1955) (One-stripe anthias)
- Pseudanthias flavicauda J. E. Randall & Pyle, 2001
- Pseudanthias fucinus (J. E. Randall & S. Ralston, 1985)
- Pseudanthias georgei (G. R. Allen, 1976) (George's basslet)
- Pseudanthias gibbosus (Klunzinger 1884)
- Pseudanthias hangapiko Shepherd, Pinheiro, Tyler A. Y. Phelps, Alejandro Pérez-Matus, L. A. Rocha- 2021 (Hanga Piko anthias)
- Pseudanthias heemstrai Schuhmacher, Krupp & J. E. Randall, 1989 (Orangehead anthias)
- Pseudanthias hiva J. E. Randall & Pyle, 2001
- Pseudanthias huchtii (Bleeker, 1857) (Red-cheeked fairy basslet)
- Pseudanthias hutomoi (G. R. Allen & Burhanuddin, 1976) (Hutomo's anthias)
- Pseudanthias hypselosoma Bleeker, 1878 (Stocky anthias)
- Pseudanthias leucozonus (Katayama & H. Masuda, 1982)
- Pseudanthias lunulatus (Kotthaus, 1973) (Lunate goldie)
- Pseudanthias luzonensis (Katayama & H. Masuda, 1983) (Yellowlined anthias)
- Pseudanthias manadensis (Bleeker, 1856)
- Pseudanthias marcia J. E. Randall & J. P. Hoover, 1993 (Marcia's anthias)
- Pseudanthias mica G. R. Allen & Erdmann, 2012 (Mica's anthias)
- Pseudanthias mooreanus (Herre, 1935)
- Pseudanthias nobilis (V. Franz, 1910)
- Pseudanthias olivaceus (J. E. Randall & McCosker, 1982)
- Pseudanthias oumati J. T. Williams, Delrieu-Trottin & Planes, 2013 (Saffron anthias)
- Pseudanthias paralourgus Gill, Pogonoski, Johnson & Tea 2021
- Pseudanthias pictilis (J. E. Randall & G. R. Allen, 1978) (Painted anthias)
- Pseudanthias pillai Heemstra & Akhilesh, 2012
- Pseudanthias pleurotaenia Bleeker, 1857 (Square-spot fairy basslet)
- Pseudanthias pulcherrimus (Heemstra & J. E. Randall, 1986) (Resplendent goldie)
- Pseudanthias randalli (Lubbock & G. R. Allen, 1978) (Randall's fairy basslet)
- Pseudanthias rubrizonatus (J. E. Randall, 1983) (Red-belted anthias)
- Pseudanthias rubrolineatus (Fourmanoir & Rivaton, 1979)
- Pseudanthias sheni J. E. Randall & G. R. Allen, 1989 (Shen's basslet)
- Pseudanthias squamipinnis (W. K. H. Peters, 1855) (Sea goldie)
- Pseudanthias taeniatus (Klunzinger, 1884)
- Pseudanthias taira E. J. Schmidt, 1931
- Pseudanthias tequila Gill, Tea & Senou 2017
- Pseudanthias thompsoni (Fowler, 1923) (Hawaiian anthias)
- Pseudanthias townsendi (Boulenger, 1897) (Townsend's anthias)
- Pseudanthias venator Snyder, 1911
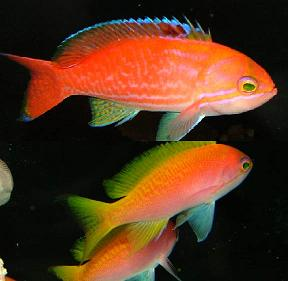
Pseudanthias bimaculatus

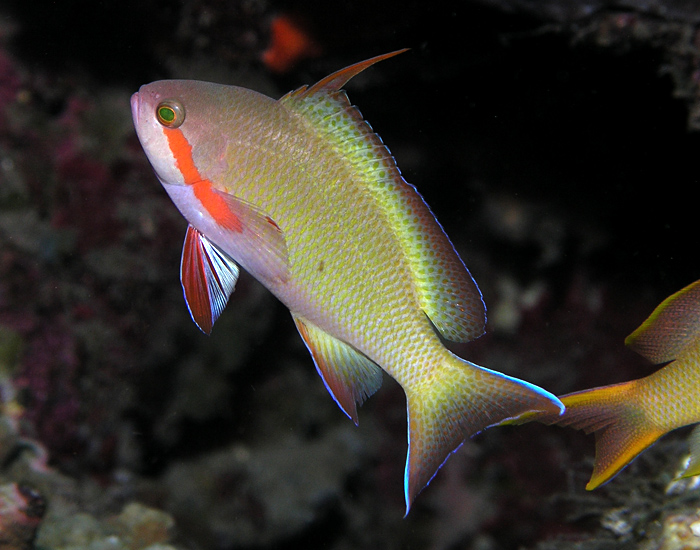
Pseudanthias huchtii

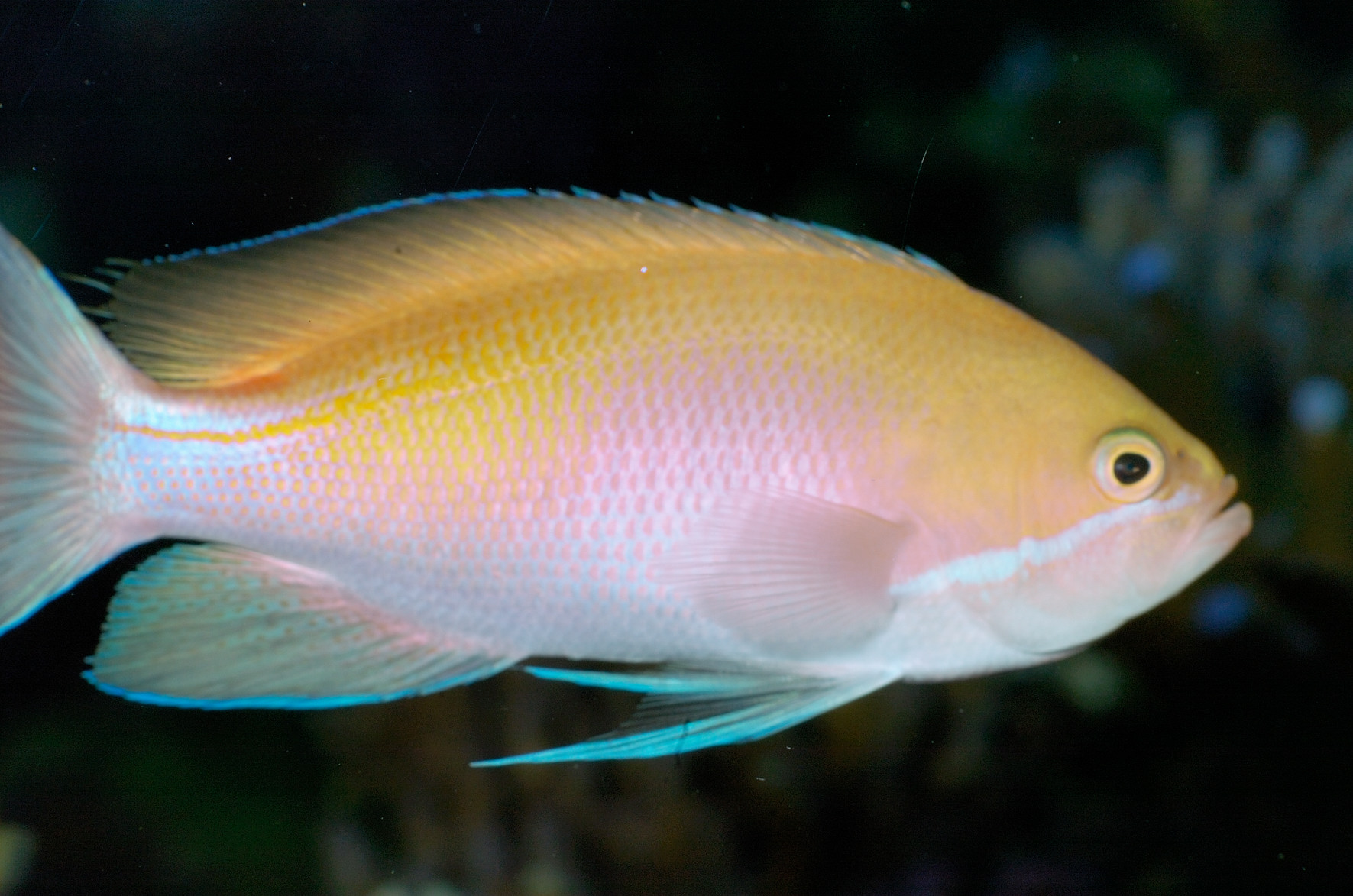
Pseudanthias marcia

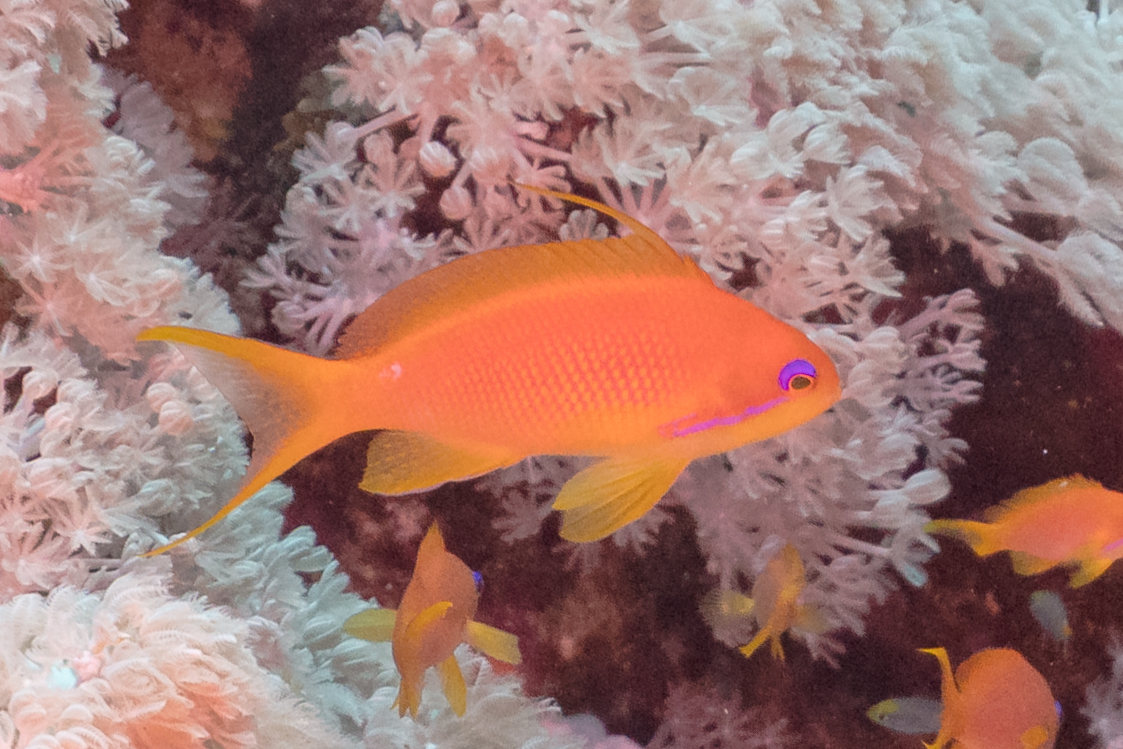
Pseudanthias squamipinnis

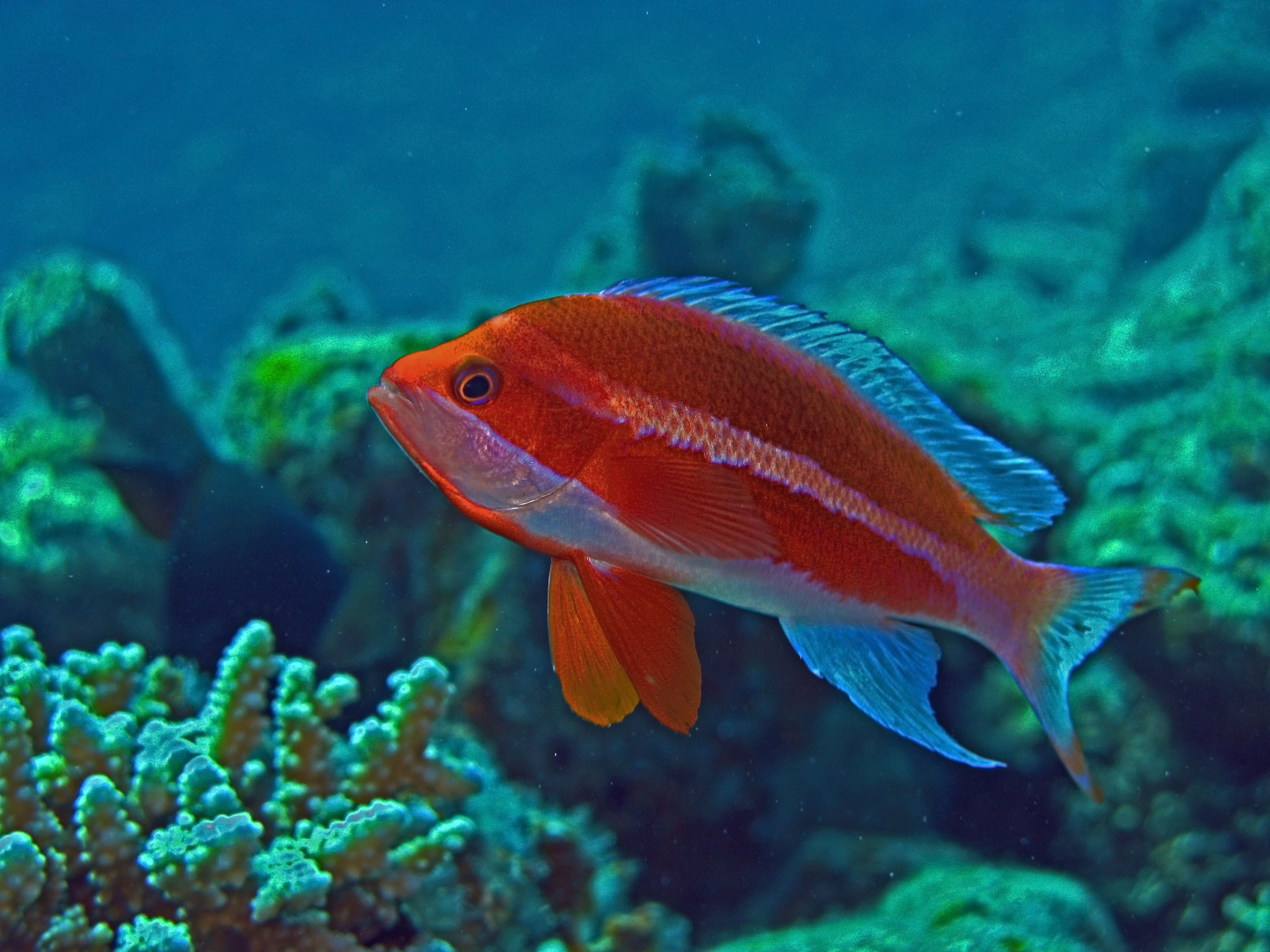
Pseudanthias taeniatus
