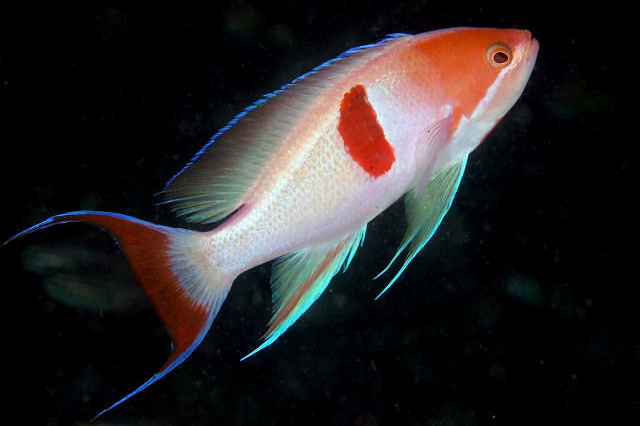
- Adult male

Conservation status
- Least Concern (IUCN 3.1)

Scientific classification
- Kingdom: Animalia
- Phylum: Chordata
- Class: Actinopterygii
- Division: Teleostei
- Order: Perciformes
- Family: Anthiadidae
- Genus: Pseudanthias
- Species: P. rubrizonatus

Binomial name
- Pseudanthias rubrizonatus (Randall, 1983)

Synonyms
- Anthias rubrizonatus Randall, 1983

= Pseudanthias rubrizonatus =

Species of fish

Pseudanthias rubrizonatus, the red-belted anthias, liliac-tip basslet, deepsea fairy basslet, lilac-tipped seaperch, redband anthias, red-band basslet or redbar anthias, is a species of marine ray-finned fish in the family Anthiadidae. It is found in the Indo-Pacific, and may grow to 12 cm in length.

== Taxonomy ==
Pseudanthias rubrizonatus was first formally described in 1983 as Anthias rubrizonatus by the American ichthyologist John E. Randall with the type locality given as the southwestern side of Savo Island in the Solomon Islands. It has since been moved to Pseudanthias. It is similar in appearance to Pseudanthias connelli of South Africa.

== Description ==
Males of this species are pinkish to pinkish orange at the anterior end of the body and are frequently bright yellow on the posterior of the body and on the caudal fin, these two areas being separated by a wide red, vertical bar. There is a lilac-colored stripe which runs from below the eye to the lower part of pectoral-fin base, and the dorsal fin has a lilac margin, as do the outer lobes of the caudal fin. In contrast, in females, the stripe mentioned above is violet, and the caudal-fin lobes are red. In terms of body coloration, females are reddish pink, paler ventrally, and each scale has a dark spot in it. Juveniles show lavender tips to the spines in the dorsal fin. The dorsal fin of this species has 10 spines and 16 soft rays while the anal fin has 3 spines and 7 soft rays, and the maximum total length is 12 cm (4.7 in).

== Distribution and habitat ==
Pseudanthias rubrizonatus is found in the Indo-Pacific region, where it occurs from the Andaman Sea to Fiji and from southern Japan to Australia and the Great Barrier Reef. In Australia, it occurs as far south as Sydney.

Pseuadanthias rubrizonatus is found at depths of 3–152 m (9.8–498.7 ft), in aggregations around isolated coral heads and patches of rubble. Juveniles may also be found in harbors and over silted coral reefs.

== Biology ==
Like most other anthias species, Pseuadanthias rubrizonatus is a protogynous hermaphrodite. Also following the general trend, fish of this species shoal in large numbers, although there are more intimate subdivisions within a shoal. Each of such subdivision is called "harem", and typically consists of one male and several females. The females have a hierarchy among themselves, and when the male dies or disappears, the most dominant female changes sex.

=== Diet ===
This species normally feeds on zooplankton but is opportunistically piscivorous.

== Relationship with humans ==
This species appears in the aquarium trade.
