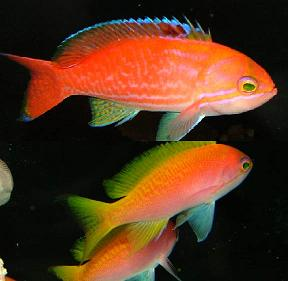
- Male above, female below

Conservation status
- Least Concern (IUCN 3.1)

Scientific classification
- Kingdom: Animalia
- Phylum: Chordata
- Class: Actinopterygii
- Order: Perciformes
- Family: Anthiadidae
- Genus: Pseudanthias
- Species: P. bimaculatus

Binomial name
- Pseudanthias bimaculatus (J. L. B. Smith, 1955)

Synonyms
- Anthias bimaculatus J. L. B. Smith, 1955

= Pseudanthias bimaculatus =

Species of fish

Pseudanthias bimaculatus, two-spot basslet, twospot anthias, twinspot anthias and bimac anthias, is a species of marine ray-finned fish from the subfamily Anthiinae of the family Serranidae, the groupers and sea basses. It is an Indo-Pacific species of reefs.

== Appearance ==
They are a medium-sized anthias reaching a maximum of 5in/12 cm at adulthood. This species is sexually dimorphic, meaning the males and females have differing physical characteristics. Pseudanthias bimaculatus males are primarily red with jagged pink lines along the body. Males will have a red tail with clear to white tips. Males will typically have yellow highlights on the tail, anal fins, and head area. Males also have one or two spots on their dorsal fin, hence the scientific name 'bimaculatus', meaning two spots. Females will be primarily pink with yellow fins and tail. Females will typically have a yellow line stretching across the head through their eyes.

== Diet ==
Pseudanthias bimaculatus are primarily carnivorous. The diet composing mainly of zooplankton and floating filamentous algae in the wild. In the aquarium, a varied diet of mysis shrimp, vitamin-enriched brine shrimp, frozen preparations and other meaty items for zooplankton feeders. Multiple small feedings throughout the day are recommended for this species.

== Range ==
It is found in various reefs of ranging in the Indo-West Pacific from East Africa, Maldives, and Indonesia. It is a deep water species typically found in coastal drop-offs.

== In the Aquarium ==
Pseudanthias bimaculatus do well when kept in an aquarium over 70 gallons. It is a deep water species that seems to do well when several hiding places are made available. It is considered a moderately difficult fish to care for and reef compatible.

Like other anthias species, Pseudanthias bimaculatus share the trait of being hermaphroditic. If a dominant male perishes, the largest female of the group will often morph to take its place.

They are peaceful aquarium inhabitants and will rarely bother their tankmates. The only exception seems to be males of the same species. This species may also be aggressive to other anthiae species. They are generally considered safe with any invertebrates. Possible tankmates include clownfish, blennies, gobies, Chromis, and butterflyfish.
