= Clive Forster-Cooper =

English palaeontologist

- Born: 3 April 1880; London
- Died: 23 August 1947 (aged 67)
- Education: Trinity College, Cambridge
- Scientific career
- Fields: Palaeontology

Sir Clive Forster-Cooper, FRS (3 April 1880 – 23 August 1947) was an English palaeontologist and director of the Cambridge University Museum of Zoology and Natural History Museum in London. He was the first to describe Paraceratherium, also commonly known as Indricotherium or Baluchitherium, the largest known land mammal.

== Early life ==
Forster-Cooper was born on 3 April 1880 in Hampstead, London, the second child and only son of John Forster Cooper and his wife Mary Emily Miley. His maternal grandfather, Miles Miley, was an amateur botanist and naturalist, and encouraged Clive Forster-Cooper in his interest in natural history. He was educated at Summer Fields School, Oxford, Rugby School. In 1897 he went up to Trinity College, Cambridge, and took a BA in 1901 and MA in 1904.

== Early career ==
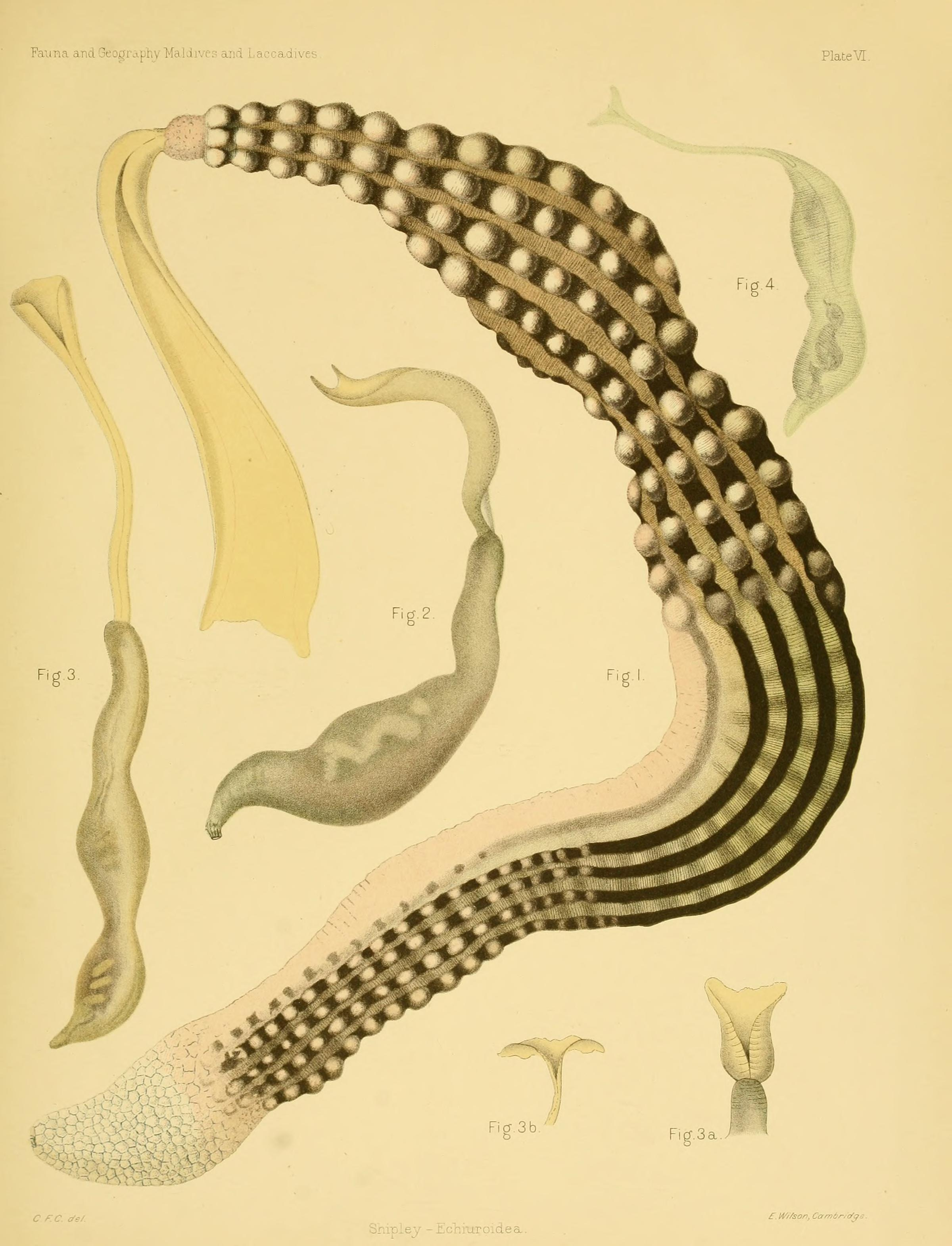
Zoological illustration of spoon worms made by Forster-Cooper during the Maldives expedition

In 1900, Forster Cooper travelled with John Stanley Gardiner to the Maldive and Laccadive Islands to undertake collections and study the formation of coral reefs. From 1902 to 1903 he was naturalist to the North Seas Fisheries Commission Scientific Investigations, sailing around the Indian Ocean, taking soundings and collecting fauna and flora of the Seychelles. In 1905 Forster-Cooper joined the Percy Sladen expedition to the Indian Ocean, with Stanley Gardiner. In 1906, he returned to Cambridge and continued to work on the collections made on the expeditions to the Indian Ocean. In 1907 he met Dr C. W. Andrews, a specialist in the history of the elephant, at the British Museum of Natural History and became interested in fossil mammals.

As a result of this meeting, in 1907 he joined Dr Andrews' collecting expedition to the Fayum. His increasing interest in vertebrate palaeontology led him to the American Museum of Natural History, New York, where he worked under H. F. Osborn, then Professor of Zoology at Columbia University and Curator of the museum. He spent a year in America working closely Osborn, Matthew, Walter W. Granger and W. K. Gregory, studying the American collections of fossil mammals, and taking part in one of Granger's collecting expeditions to Wyoming.

He returned to Cambridge University, where he organized an expedition to collect large mammalian fauna, including specimens of the gigantic rhinoceros Baluchitherium, from the Bugti beds of Baluchistan.

== Work at the University of Cambridge ==
He became director of the Cambridge University Museum of Zoology in 1914, where he worked until 1938. During the First World War, he worked on human animal parasites at the School of Tropical Medicine in the University of Liverpool, which examined the action of quinine on malaria. On his return to Cambridge University after the war, he held a variety of posts in the Zoological Laboratory, including lecturer and reader in Vertebrata, and was a fellow of Trinity Hall. The museum archives hold five books of Foster Cooper's lecture notes.

== Directorship of the Natural History Museum ==
Forster-Cooper was appointed director of the Natural History Museum in London 1938. A large part of its collection was preserved in highly flammable alcohol in glass jars, and during the Second World War, the museum was bombed a number of times. Forster Cooper oversaw the removal of much of the important parts of the collection to storage at Tring.

He was elected to the Royal Society in 1936 and knighted in 1946. He was also a foreign member of the New York Academy of Sciences and of the American Museum of Natural History.

He died on 23 August 1947.

== Private life ==
On 25 July 1912 at Holy Trinity Church, Chelsea Borough, London County, Forster Cooper married Rosalie, eldest daughter of R. Tunstall-Smith, of Baltimore, Maryland, USA, by his first wife Emily Rosalie Lee Andrews (1860–1889). They had two sons and one daughter. His daughter served as a bomb spotter in London during World War II and later married an American GI and moved to the United States. He was knighted in 1946 and died on 23 August 1947. Lady Forster-Cooper died in St Marylebone in 1965.

== Publications ==
- 1903. Fauna and geography of the Maldive and Laccadive Archipelagoes. Cambridge University Press. (Articles on Cephalochorda, Antipatharia and Nemertinea.)
- 1907. (With J. S. Gardiner.) The Percy Sladen Trust Expedition to the Indian Ocean in 1905. Description of the expedition. Trans. Linn. Soc. (Zoo.), 12, 1–55. Part II. Mauritius to Seychelles. Trans. Linn. Soc. (Zoo.), 12, 111–175.
- 1910. Microchoerus erinaceus, Wood. Ann. Mag. Nat. Hist. ser. 8, 6, 39–43.
- 1911. Paraceratherium bugtiense, a new genus of Rhinocerotidae from the Bugti Hills of Baluchistan. Preliminary notice. Ann. Mag. Nat. Hist. ser. 8, 8, 711–716.
- 1913. Thaumastotherium osborni, a new genus of Perissodactyles from the Upper Oligocene deposits of the Bugti Hills of Baluchistan. Preliminary notice. Ann. Mag. Nat. Hist. ser. 8, 12, 367–381.
- 1913. New Anthracotheres and allied forms from Baluchistan. Preliminary notice. Ann. Mag. Nat. Hist. ser. 8, 12, 514–522.
- 1915. New genera and species of mammals from the Miocene deposits of Baluchistan. Preliminary notice. Ann. Mag. Nat. Hist. ser. 8, 16, 404–410.
- 1920. Chalicotheriodea from Baluchistan. Proc. Zool. Soc. Lond. pp. 357–366.
- 1922. Metamynodon bugtiensis, sp. n., from the Dera Bugti deposits of Baluchistan. Preliminary notice. Ann. Mag. Nat. Hist. ser. 9, 9, 617.
- 1922. Miocene Proboscidia from Baluchistan. Proc. Zool. Soc. Lond. pp. 609–626.
- 1922. Macrotherium salinum, sp. n., a new Chalicothere from India. Ann. Mag. Nat. Hist. ser. 9, 10, 542.
- 1922. A case of secondary adaptation in a tortoise. Ann. Mag. Nat. Hist. ser. 9, 10, 155–157.
- 1923. Note on a lower jaw of an African Elephant. Ann. Mag. Nat. Hist. ser. 9, 12, 263–264.
- 1923. Carnivora from the Dera Bugti deposits of Baluchistan. Ann. Mag. Nat. Hist. ser. 9, 12, 259.
- 1923. Baluchitherium osborni (? syn. Indricotherium turgaicum, Borrissyak). Phil. Trans. B, 212, 35–66.
- 1924. On the skull and dentition of Paraceratherium bugtiense: a genus of aberrant rhinoceroses, from the Lower Miocene deposits of Dera Bugti. Phil. Trans. B, 212, 369–394.
- 1924. The Anthracotheriidae of the Dera Bugti deposits in Baluchistan. Mem. Geol. Surv. India, Palaeontol. Indica, n.s. Mem. no. 2, 8, 1–59.
- 1924. On remains of extinct Proboscidea in the Museums of Geology and Zoology in the University of Cambridge. I. Elephas antiquus. Proc. Camb. Phil. Soc. (Biol. Soc.), 1, no. 2, 108–120.
- 1925. Notes on the species of Ancodon from the Hempstead Beds. Ann. Mag. Nat. Hist. ser. 9, 16, 113–138.
- 1926. Brachyodus woodi, a new species from the Hempstead Beds. Ann. Mag. Nat. Hist. ser. 9, 17, 337.
- 1928. On the ear region of certain of the Chrysochloridae. Phil. Trans. B, 216, 265–283.
- 1928. Pseudamphimeryx hantonensis. Ann. Mag. Nat. Hist. ser. 10, 2, 49–55.
- 1928. (With C. W. Andrews.) On a specimen of Elephas antiquus from Upnor. B.M.N.H. monograph.
- 1932. The genus Hyracotherium. A revision and description of new specimens found in England. Phil. Trans. B, 221, 431–448.
- 1932. Mammalian remains from the Lower Eocene of the London Clay. Ann. Mag. Nat. Hist. ser. 10, 9, 458–467.
- 1934. The extinct rhinoceroses of Baluchistan. Phil. Trans. 223, 569–616.
- 1934. A note on the body scaling of Pterichthyodes. Palaeobiol. 6, 25–29.
- 1937. The Middle Devonian fish fauna of Achanarras. Trans. Roy. Soc. Edinb. 59, pt. 1, no. 7, 223–239.

== Taxon named in his honor ==
- The red-bar anthias, Pseudanthias cooperi.
