= Pseudanthias thompsoni =

Scientific classification
- Kingdom: Animalia
- Phylum: Chordata
- Class: Actinopterygii
- Order: Perciformes
- Family: Anthiadidae
- Genus: Pseudanthias
- Species: P. thompsoni

Binomial name
- Pseudanthias thompsoni (Fowler, 1923)

Marine fish species

Pseudanthias thompsoni, also called the Hawaiian or Thompsonʻs anthias, is a marine fish species in the family Anthiadidae.

== Description and anatomy ==
Pseudanthias thompsoni is about nine inches long with a bright neon orange body, and a tinge of purple on its fins and around its eyes. The tail is u-shaped with pointed tips. Males are larger than females. Pseudanthias thompsoni mainly feeds on zooplankton such as copepods and shrimp larvae.

== Distribution and habitat ==
Pseudanthias thompsoni is located in the Pacific Ocean, specifically the Ogasawara Islands and Hawaii. Recently there has been a growing number of them along three atolls towards the Northwestern Hawaiian Islands. In 2012, many juveniles were found in deep coral reefs, utilizing the algae beds for protection.
