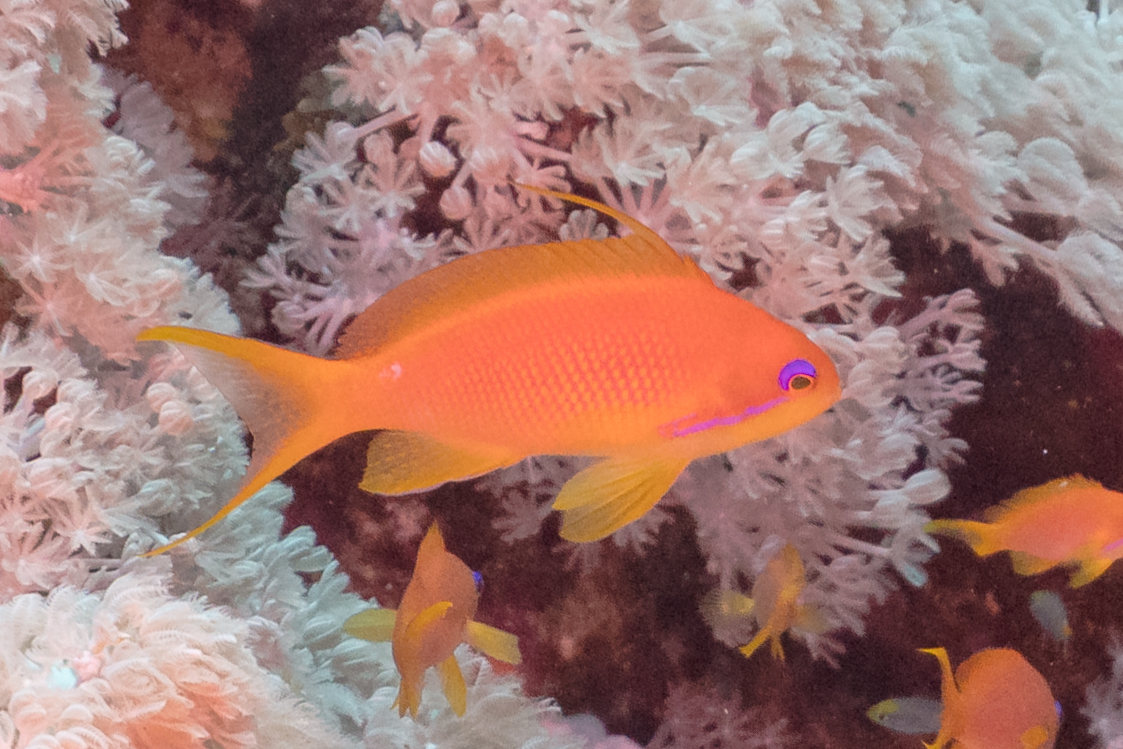

Conservation status
- Least Concern (IUCN 3.1)

Scientific classification
- Kingdom: Animalia
- Phylum: Chordata
- Class: Actinopterygii
- Order: Perciformes
- Family: Anthiadidae
- Genus: Pseudanthias
- Species: P. squamipinnis

Binomial name
- Pseudanthias squamipinnis (Peters, 1885)

= Sea goldie =

Species of fish

The sea goldie (Pseudanthias squamipinnis), also known as the orange basslet, lyretail coralfish, onestripe goldie, lyretail anthias, lyretail fairy basslet, orange fairy basslet, orange seaperch, scalefin basslet, scalefin Fairy basslet and scalefin anthias, is a species of marine ray-finned fish, an anthias from the subfamily Anthiinae part of the family Serranidae, the groupers and sea basses. It has a wide Indo-Pacific distribution. It is found in the aquarium trade.

== Range ==
The sea goldie is found in the western Indian Ocean including the Red Sea, and in the Pacific Ocean as far east as Japan, the Great Barrier Reef, and southeast Australia. It is absent from the Persian Gulf, Hawaii, and Oman.

== Description ==
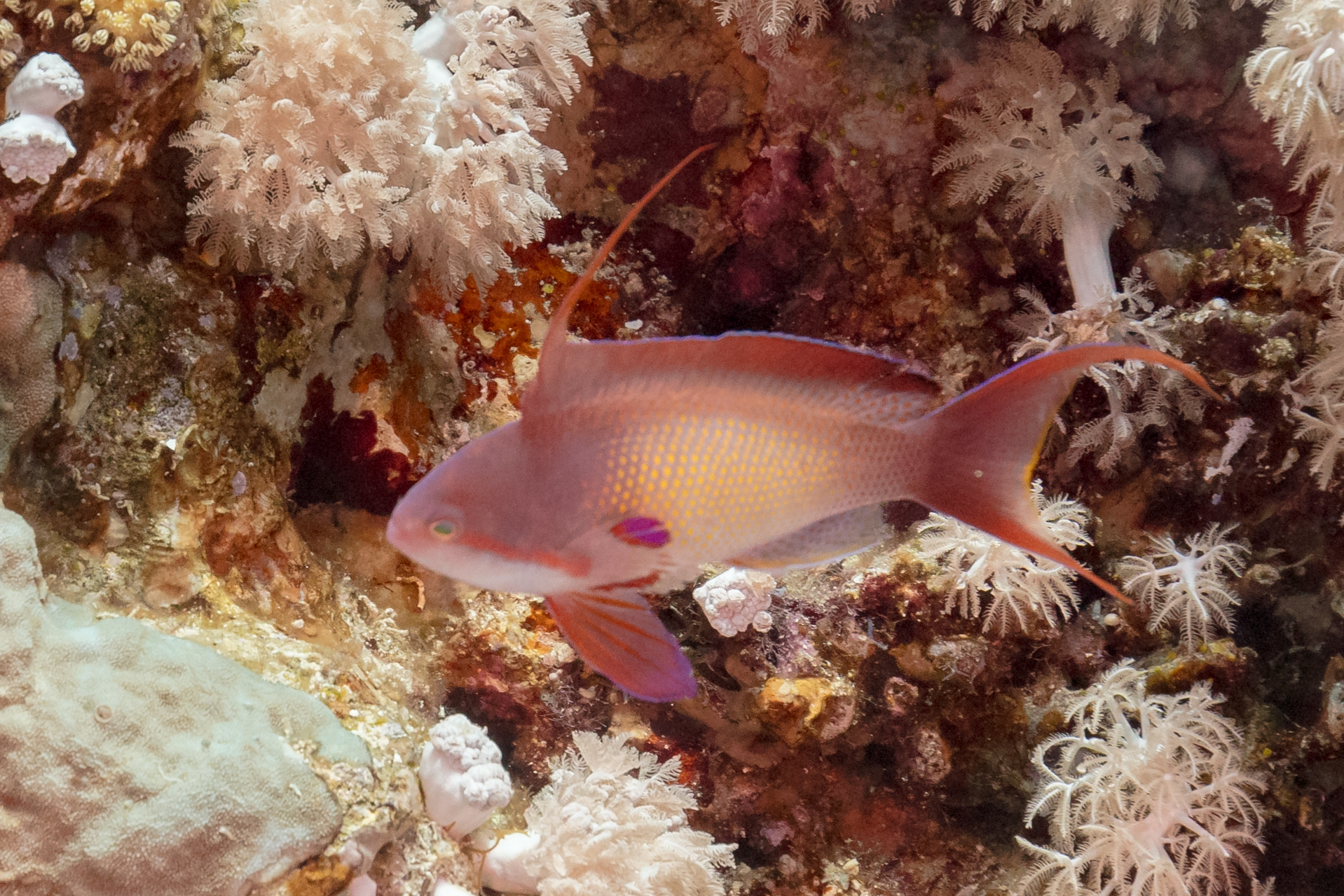
Male sea goldie, Dahab

This species shows marked dimorphism:

- Female: Length up to 7 cm (2.75 in), orange/gold color with violet streak below the eye
- Male: Length up to 15 cm (5.9 in), fuchsia color with elongated third ray of the dorsal fin, a red patch on the pectoral fin, and elongated margins of the tail

The midas blenny, Ecsenius midas, goes through a phase of yellow colouration and is a social mimic of the sea goldie.

The sea goldie feeds primarily on zooplankton. Like other anthias, the sea goldie is a protogynous hermaphrodite; a male retains a harem of five to 10 females, but when the male dies or leaves, the largest and most dominant female will undergo hormonal and physical changes to become the harems new male. This change can take several weeks to months to complete. Spawning occurs at sunset, between December and February (in the Red Sea).

== Habitat ==
The fish lives around coral outcrops in clear lagoons, patch reefs, and steep slopes to a depth of 35 m, often found in the company of Chromis dimidiata. They are often found in very large schools above the reef.
