= List of fishes of Ethiopia =

There are 175 species of fish in Ethiopia. Forty of these species are endemic, found only in Ethiopia.

Fish found in Ethiopia:

- Alestes baremoze
- Alestes dentex
- Amphilius lampei
- Andersonia leptura
- Aphanius dispar dispar
- Aplocheilichthys antinorii
- Aplocheilichthys jeanneli
- Aplocheilichthys rudolfianus
- Auchenoglanis biscutatus
- Auchenoglanis occidentalis
- Awaous aeneofuscus
- Bagrus bajad
- Bagrus docmak
- Bagrus urostigma
- Barbus anema
- Barbus arambourgi
- Barbus bynni bynni
- Barbus ethiopicus
- Barbus gananensis
- Barbus humilis
- Barbus kerstenii
- Barbus microterolepis
- Barbus neglectus
- Barbus osseensis
- Barbus paludinosus
- Barbus perince
- Barbus pleurogramma
- Barbus pumilus
- Barbus stigmatopygus
- Barbus tanapelagius
- Barbus trispilopleura
- Brienomyrus niger
- Brycinus affinis
- Brycinus macrolepidotus
- Brycinus nurse
- Carassius auratus auratus
- Carassius carassius
- Chelaethiops bibie
- Chiloglanis modjensis
- Chiloglanis niloticus
- Chrysichthys auratus
- Citharinus citharus citharus
- Citharinus latus
- Clarias anguillaris
- Clarias gariepinus
- Cromeria nilotica
- Ctenopharyngodon idella
- Ctenopoma muriei
- Cyprinus carpio carpio
- Danakilia franchettii
- Distichodus brevipinnis
- Distichodus engycephalus
- Distichodus niloticus
- Distichodus rostratus
- Epiplatys spilargyreius
- Esox lucius
- Gambusia holbrooki
- Garra aethiopica
- Garra blanfordii
- Garra dembecha
- Garra dembeensis
- Garra duobarbis
- Garra ethelwynnae
- Garra geba
- Garra ignestii
- Garra makiensis
- Garra quadrimaculata
- Garra regressus
- Garra tana
- Gymnarchus niloticus
- Haplochromis macconneli
- Haplochromis rudolfianus
- Haplochromis turkanae
- Hemichromis fasciatus
- Hemichromis letourneuxi
- Heterobranchus bidorsalis
- Heterobranchus longifilis
- Heterotis niloticus
- Hippopotamyrus pictus
- Hydrocynus brevis
- Hydrocynus forskahlii
- Hydrocynus vittatus
- Hyperopisus bebe bebe
- Hypophthalmichthys molitrix
- Ichthyborus besse besse
- Labeo bottegi
- Labeo boulengeri
- Labeo brunellii
- Labeo coubie
- Labeo cylindricus
- Labeo forskalii
- Labeo horie
- Labeo niloticus
- Labeo pellegrini
- Labeobarbus acutirostris
- Labeobarbus brevicephalus
- Labeobarbus crassibarbis
- Labeobarbus dainellii
- Labeobarbus gorgorensis
- Labeobarbus gorguari
- Labeobarbus intermedius intermedius
- Labeobarbus longissimus
- Labeobarbus macrophtalmus
- Labeobarbus megastoma
- Labeobarbus nedgia
- Labeobarbus platydorsus
- Labeobarbus surkis
- Labeobarbus truttiformis
- Labeobarbus tsanensis
- Lates longispinis
- Lates niloticus
- Lebias stiassnyae
- Leptocypris niloticus
- Malapterurus electricus
- Malapterurus minjiriya
- Marcusenius annamariae
- Marcusenius cyprinoides
- Micralestes elongatus
- Mochokus niloticus
- Mormyrops anguilloides
- Mormyrus caschive
- Mormyrus hasselquistii
- Mormyrus kannume
- Mormyrus longirostris
- Nannaethiops bleheri
- Nemacheilus abyssinicus
- Neobola bottegoi
- Neobola stellae
- Neolebias trewavasae
- Nothobranchius cyaneus
- Nothobranchius jubbi
- Nothobranchius microlepis
- Nothobranchius patrizii
- Oncorhynchus mykiss
- Oreochromis niloticus cancellatus
- Oreochromis niloticus filoa
- Oreochromis niloticus niloticus
- Oreochromis niloticus tana
- Oreochromis niloticus vulcani
- Oreochromis spilurus niger
- Oreochromis spilurus spilurus
- Parachanna obscura
- Petrocephalus bane bane
- Petrocephalus bovei bovei
- Pollimyrus isidori isidori
- Pollimyrus petherici
- Polypterus bichir bichir
- Polypterus endlicheri endlicheri
- Polypterus senegalus senegalus
- Protopterus aethiopicus aethiopicus
- Raiamas senegalensis
- Salmo trutta trutta
- Sarotherodon galilaeus galilaeus
- Schilbe intermedius
- Schilbe mystus
- Schilbe uranoscopus
- Siluranodon auritus
- Synodontis batensoda
- Synodontis caudovittata
- Synodontis clarias
- Synodontis eupterus
- Synodontis filamentosa
- Synodontis frontosa
- Synodontis geledensis
- Synodontis membranacea
- Synodontis nigrita
- Synodontis punctulatus
- Synodontis schall
- Synodontis serrata
- Synodontis sorex
- Tetraodon lineatus
- Tilapia rendalli
- Tilapia zillii
- Varicorhinus beso
- Varicorhinus jubae

There have been attempts to introduce species of fish in crater lakes that are isolated from the rivers of Ethiopia, successful at Babogaya just outside Debre Zeyit (Bishoftu) and unsuccessful at Burree Waqa near Meti.
