= Labeobarbus microterolepis =

Conservation status
- Data Deficient (IUCN 3.1)

Scientific classification
- Domain: Eukaryota
- Kingdom: Animalia
- Phylum: Chordata
- Class: Actinopterygii
- Order: Cypriniformes
- Family: Cyprinidae
- Subfamily: Torinae
- Genus: Labeobarbus
- Species: L. microterolepis

Binomial name
- Labeobarbus microterolepis Boulenger, 1902

Synonyms
- Barbus microterolepis Boulenger, 1902

Species of fish

Labeobarbus microterolepis is a species of cyprinid fish in the genus Labeobarbus. It is endemic to Ethiopia. It may also be a hybrid of Labeobarbus ethiopicus and Labeobarbus intermedius.
