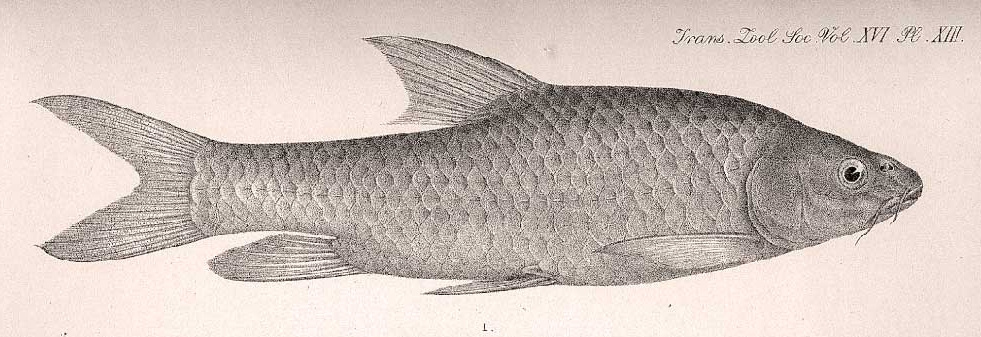

Conservation status
- Least Concern (IUCN 3.1)

Scientific classification
- Kingdom: Animalia
- Phylum: Chordata
- Class: Actinopterygii
- Order: Cypriniformes
- Family: Cyprinidae
- Subfamily: Torinae
- Genus: Labeobarbus
- Species: L. altianalis

Binomial name
- Labeobarbus altianalis (Boulenger, 1900)

Synonyms
- Many, see text

= Ripon barbel =

Species of fish

The Ripon barbel (Labeobarbus altianalis) is an East African ray-finned fish species in the family Cyprinidae. A notably large barb, its maximum recorded total length is 90 cm (35 in).

== Taxonomy ==
Like other African "barbs", placement of this species in Barbus – the genus of the typical barbels and relatives – was provisional. Though called "barbel", it is probably not closely enough related to the typical barbels – the core group of Barbus – to be considered congeneric. Several supposedly distinct species have been merged into B. altianalis, and numerous subspecies have been proposed. None of these are deemed valid. Some authorities place this species in the genus Labeobarbus. On the other hand, B. longifilis, B. paucisquamatus and B. somereni were once considered subspecies of L: altianalis, the second as sspp. lobogenysoides and paucisquamata and the third as ssp. urundensis.

Significant junior synonyms of L. altianalis are:

- Labeobarbus altianalis altianalis Boulenger, 1900
- Labeobarbus altianalis eduardianus Boulenger, 1901
- Labeobarbus altianalis labiosa Pellegrin, 1933
- Labeobarbus altianalis radcliffi (lapsus)
- Labeobarbus altianalis radcliffii Boulenger, 1903
- Labeobarbus bayoni Boulenger, 1911
- Labeobarbus hollyi Lohberger, 1929
- Labeobarbus lobogenys Boulenger, 1906
- Labeobarbus pietschmanni Lohberger, 1929
- Labeobarbus pietschmanni hollyi Lohberger, 1929
- Labeobarbus pietschmanni pietschmanni Lohberger, 1929
- Labeobarbus procatopus Boulenger, 1916
- Labeobarbus radcliffi (lapsus)
- Labeobarbus radcliffii Boulenger, 1903
- Labeobarbus rueppellii Pfeffer, 1896

L. procatopus was described from the Amala River, which was mistakenly believed to be to the east of Lake Baringo. The Ripon barbel does not occur there, and the taxon was thus thought to refer to Labeobarbus intermedius. But the Amala is actually a tributary of the Mara River, where L. altianalis is found, and L. procatopus is thus a junior synonym of it.

== Distribution and ecology ==
The Ripon barbel inhabits Lake Victoria and its drainage basin and surrounding areas in the East African Rift, including Lake Edward, George, Kyoga and Kivu, and the Ruzizi River down to its delta (though not adjacent Lake Tanganyika) and the upper and middle Kagera River. Records from the Tana River are in error. The countries in which it is found are Burundi, Democratic Republic of the Congo, Kenya, Rwanda, Tanzania and Uganda.

It lives in diverse freshwater habitats, from inshore waters of lakes to rapidly flowing rivers. This species is an omnivore, eating water plants, molluscs and fishes. It is fished for sport and food; its Kagera River population being of some commercial significance.

Widespread and apparently rather plentiful for such a large fish due to its ecological tolerance and omnivorous habits, the Ripon barbel is not considered a threatened species by the IUCN. Local stocks might be temporarily affected by erosion after deforestation increasing turbidity and upsetting the aquatic plant life, and unsustainable growth of the fisheries e.g. along the Kagera must be avoided considering that it is presumably – as per its large size and like many relatives – slow-growing and takes long to mature.
