= Labeobarbus matris =

Conservation status
- Vulnerable (IUCN 3.1)

Scientific classification
- Kingdom: Animalia
- Phylum: Chordata
- Class: Actinopterygii
- Order: Cypriniformes
- Family: Cyprinidae
- Subfamily: Torinae
- Genus: Labeobarbus
- Species: L. matris

Binomial name
- Labeobarbus matris (Holly, 1928)

Synonyms
- Barbus matris

Species of fish

Labeobarbus matris is a species of ray-finned fish in the genus Labeobarbus which is endemic to the Athi River in Kenya. It may be conspecific with Labeobarbus mariae.
