= Rhinofish =

Scientific classification
- Kingdom: Animalia
- Phylum: Chordata
- Class: Actinopterygii
- Order: Cypriniformes
- Family: Cyprinidae
- Subfamily: Torinae
- Genus: Labeobarbus
- Species: L. rhinoceros

Binomial name
- Labeobarbus rhinoceros Copley, 1938

Synonyms
- Barbus rhinoceros Copley, 1938

Species of fish

The rhinofish (Labeobarbus rhinoceros) is a ray-finned fish species in the family Cyprinidae. Its taxonomic identity is not entirely clear. Some taxonomic authorities consider Labeobarbus mariae as the rhinofish, however Fishbase identifies the range of L. mariae as occurring in Guinea. Rhinofish appear to occur in Kenya, as the range seems not to be in dispute. Further clarification is needed on both species.

Its natural habitat is rivers. Its status is insufficiently known, mainly due to the taxonomic uncertainties.
