= Labeobarbus wurtzi =

Conservation status
- Least Concern (IUCN 3.1)

Scientific classification
- Domain: Eukaryota
- Kingdom: Animalia
- Phylum: Chordata
- Class: Actinopterygii
- Order: Cypriniformes
- Family: Cyprinidae
- Subfamily: Torinae
- Genus: Labeobarbus
- Species: L. wurtzi

Binomial name
- Labeobarbus wurtzi (Pellegrin, 1908)

Synonyms
- Barbus wurtzi Pellegrin, 1908; Barbodes wurtzi (Pellegrin, 1908); Varicorhinus wurtzi (Pellegrin, 1908); Barbus barryi Daget, 1962; Barbus holasi Daget, 1965

Species of fish

Labeobarbus wurtzi is a species of ray-finned fish in the genus Labeobarbus from the coastal river bains of Côte d'Ivoire; Ghana; Guinea; Liberia and Sierra Leone.
