= Labeobarbus humphri =

Scientific classification
- Kingdom: Animalia
- Phylum: Chordata
- Class: Actinopterygii
- Order: Cypriniformes
- Family: Cyprinidae
- Subfamily: Torinae
- Genus: Labeobarbus
- Species: L. humphri

Binomial name
- Labeobarbus humphri Banister, 1976

Synonyms
- Barbus humphri Banister, 1976

Species of fish

Labeobarbus humphri is a species of ray-finned fish in the genus Labeobarbus from the Democratic Republic of the Congo where it is only known from one location.
