= Labeobarbus claudinae =

Conservation status
- Vulnerable (IUCN 3.1)

Scientific classification
- Kingdom: Animalia
- Phylum: Chordata
- Class: Actinopterygii
- Order: Cypriniformes
- Family: Cyprinidae
- Subfamily: Torinae
- Genus: Labeobarbus
- Species: L. claudinae

Binomial name
- Labeobarbus claudinae De Vos & Thys van den Audenaerde, 1990

Synonyms
- Barbus claudinae De Vos & Thys Van Den Audenaerde, 1990

Species of fish

Labeobarbus claudinae is a species of ray-finned fish in the family Cyprinidae. It is found in Burundi and Rwanda. Its natural habitats are rivers, freshwater lakes, freshwater marshes, and inland deltas. It is threatened by habitat loss.
