= Labeobarbus parawaldroni =

Conservation status
- Least Concern (IUCN 3.1)

Scientific classification
- Kingdom: Animalia
- Phylum: Chordata
- Class: Actinopterygii
- Order: Cypriniformes
- Family: Cyprinidae
- Subfamily: Torinae
- Genus: Labeobarbus
- Species: L. parawaldroni

Binomial name
- Labeobarbus parawaldroni Lévêque, Thys van den Audenaerde & Traoré, 1987

Synonyms
- Barbus parawaldroni Lévêque, Thys van den Audenaerde & Traoré, 1987

Species of fish

Labeobarbus parawaldroni is a species of ray-finned fish in the genus Labeobarbus which occurs in western Côte d'Ivoire and eastern Liberia.
