= Labeobarbus semireticulatus =

Scientific classification
- Domain: Eukaryota
- Kingdom: Animalia
- Phylum: Chordata
- Class: Actinopterygii
- Order: Cypriniformes
- Family: Cyprinidae
- Subfamily: Torinae
- Genus: Labeobarbus
- Species: L. semireticulatus

Binomial name
- Labeobarbus semireticulatus (Pellegrin, 1924)

Synonyms
- Varicorhinus semireticulatus

Species of fish

Labeobarbus semireticulatus is a species of ray-finned fish in the genus Labeobarbus is endemic to the Louvisi River in Gabon.
