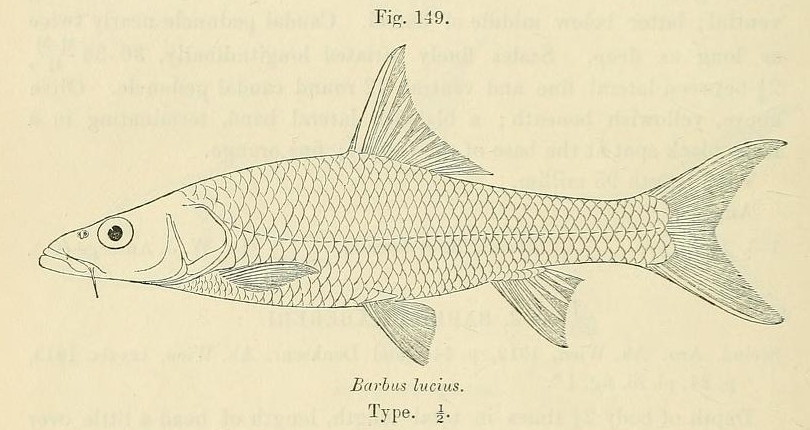

Conservation status
- Data Deficient (IUCN 3.1)

Scientific classification
- Domain: Eukaryota
- Kingdom: Animalia
- Phylum: Chordata
- Class: Actinopterygii
- Order: Cypriniformes
- Family: Cyprinidae
- Subfamily: Torinae
- Genus: Labeobarbus
- Species: L. lucius

Binomial name
- Labeobarbus lucius (Boulenger, 1910)

Synonyms
- Barbus lucius Boulenger, 1910

= Labeobarbus lucius =

Species of fish

Labeobarbus lucius is a species of cyprinid fish found in Angola and the Republic of the Congo.
