= Labeobarbus clarkeae =

Scientific classification
- Domain: Eukaryota
- Kingdom: Animalia
- Phylum: Chordata
- Class: Actinopterygii
- Order: Cypriniformes
- Family: Cyprinidae
- Subfamily: Torinae
- Genus: Labeobarbus
- Species: L. clarkeae

Binomial name
- Labeobarbus clarkeae (Banister, 1984)

Synonyms
- Varicorhinus clarkeae

Species of fish

Labeobarbus clarkeae is a species of ray-finned fish in the family Cyprinidae. It is endemic to Angola.
