= Labeobarbus brevispinis =

Conservation status
- Least Concern (IUCN 3.1)

Scientific classification
- Kingdom: Animalia
- Phylum: Chordata
- Class: Actinopterygii
- Order: Cypriniformes
- Family: Cyprinidae
- Subfamily: Torinae
- Genus: Labeobarbus
- Species: L. brevispinis

Binomial name
- Labeobarbus brevispinis (Holly, 1927)

Synonyms
- Barbus brevispinis Holly, 1927

Species of fish

Labeobarbus brevispinis is a species of cyprinid fish endemic to Cameroon in Africa.
