= Labeobarbus xyrocheilus =

Scientific classification
- Kingdom: Animalia
- Phylum: Chordata
- Class: Actinopterygii
- Order: Cypriniformes
- Family: Cyprinidae
- Subfamily: Torinae
- Genus: Labeobarbus
- Species: L. xyrocheilus

Binomial name
- Labeobarbus xyrocheilus (Tweddle & Skelton, 1998)

Synonyms
- Varicorhinus xyrocheilus

Species of fish

Labeobarbus xyrocheilus is a species of ray-finned fish in the genus Labeobarbus endemic to the Ruo River in Malawi.
