= Labeobarbus sacratus =

Conservation status
- Least Concern (IUCN 3.1)

Scientific classification
- Domain: Eukaryota
- Kingdom: Animalia
- Phylum: Chordata
- Class: Actinopterygii
- Order: Cypriniformes
- Family: Cyprinidae
- Genus: Labeobarbus
- Species: L. sacratus

Binomial name
- Labeobarbus sacratus (Daget, 1963)

Synonyms
- Barbus sacratus Daget, 1963

Species of fish

Labeobarbus sacratus is a species of ray-finned fish in the genus Labeobarbus from West Africa.
