= Labeobarbus jubae =

Scientific classification
- Domain: Eukaryota
- Kingdom: Animalia
- Phylum: Chordata
- Class: Actinopterygii
- Order: Cypriniformes
- Family: Cyprinidae
- Subfamily: Torinae
- Genus: Labeobarbus
- Species: L. jubae

Binomial name
- Labeobarbus jubae (Banister, 1984)

Synonyms
- Varicorhinus jubae Banister, 1984.

Species of fish

Labeobarbus jubae is a species of ray-finned fish in the genus Labeobarbus which is endemic to Ethiopia.
