= Labeobarbus jaegeri =

Scientific classification
- Kingdom: Animalia
- Phylum: Chordata
- Class: Actinopterygii
- Order: Cypriniformes
- Family: Cyprinidae
- Subfamily: Torinae
- Genus: Labeobarbus
- Species: L. jaegeri

Binomial name
- Labeobarbus jaegeri (Holly, 1930)

Synonyms
- Varicorhinus jaegeri Holly, 1930.

Species of fish

Labeobarbus jaegeri is a species of ray-finned fish in the genus Labeobarbus which is found only in the Sanaga River in Cameroon.
