= Labeobarbus ansorgii =

Scientific classification
- Domain: Eukaryota
- Kingdom: Animalia
- Phylum: Chordata
- Class: Actinopterygii
- Order: Cypriniformes
- Family: Cyprinidae
- Subfamily: Torinae
- Genus: Labeobarbus
- Species: L. ansorgii

Binomial name
- Labeobarbus ansorgii (Boulenger, 1906)

Synonyms
- Varicorhinus ansorgii

Species of fish

Labeobarbus ansorgii is a species of ray-finned fish in the family Cyprinidae. It is endemic to the Kwango River in Angola.
