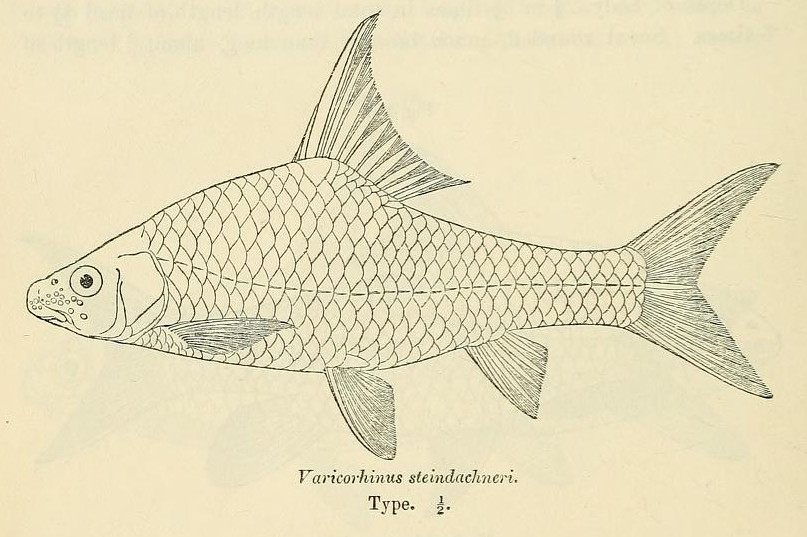

Scientific classification
- Domain: Eukaryota
- Kingdom: Animalia
- Phylum: Chordata
- Class: Actinopterygii
- Order: Cypriniformes
- Family: Cyprinidae
- Subfamily: Torinae
- Genus: Labeobarbus
- Species: L. steindachneri

Binomial name
- Labeobarbus steindachneri (Boulenger, 1910)

Synonyms
- Barbus steindachneri; Varicorhinus steindachneri

= Labeobarbus steindachneri =

Species of fish

Labeobarbus steindachneri is a species of ray-finned fish in the genus Labeobarbus that is found from Cameroon to Cabinda.
