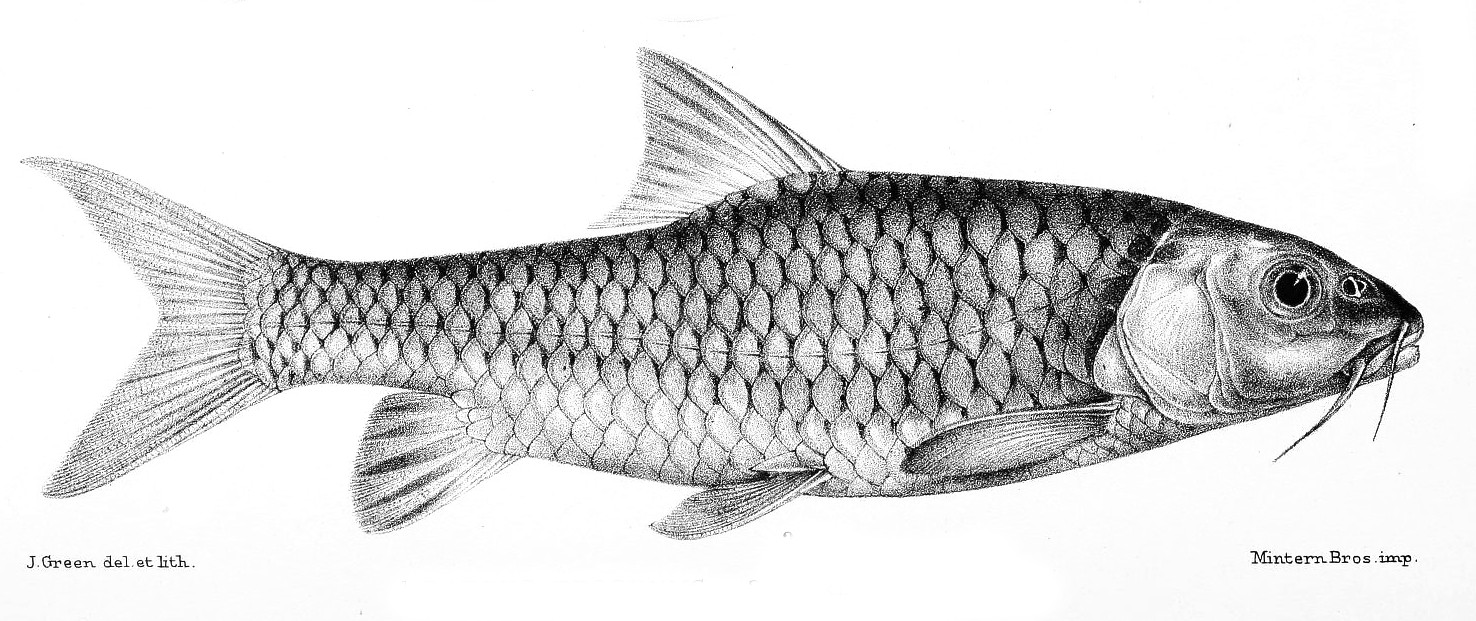

Conservation status
- Least Concern (IUCN 3.1)

Scientific classification
- Domain: Eukaryota
- Kingdom: Animalia
- Phylum: Chordata
- Class: Actinopterygii
- Order: Cypriniformes
- Family: Cyprinidae
- Subfamily: Torinae
- Genus: Labeobarbus
- Species: L. batesii

Binomial name
- Labeobarbus batesii (Boulenger, 1903)

Synonyms
- Barbus batesii Boulenger, 1903; Barbus linnellii Lönnberg, 1904

= Labeobarbus batesii =

Species of fish

Labeobarbus batesii is a species of cyprinid fish from Africa that occurs in Cameroon, Chad and Gabon.
