= Labeobarbus ruasae =

Conservation status
- Critically Endangered (IUCN 3.1)

Scientific classification
- Kingdom: Animalia
- Phylum: Chordata
- Class: Actinopterygii
- Order: Cypriniformes
- Family: Cyprinidae
- Subfamily: Torinae
- Genus: Labeobarbus
- Species: L. ruasae

Binomial name
- Labeobarbus ruasae (Pappenheim in Pappenheim and Boulenger, 1914)

Synonyms
- Barbus ruasae Pappenheim, 1914

Species of fish

Labeobarbus ruasae is a species of ray-finned fish in the family Cyprinidae. It is endemic to Rwanda. Its natural habitat is rivers. It is threatened by habitat loss.
