= Labeobarbus dimidiatus =

Scientific classification
- Kingdom: Animalia
- Phylum: Chordata
- Class: Actinopterygii
- Order: Cypriniformes
- Family: Cyprinidae
- Subfamily: Torinae
- Genus: Labeobarbus
- Species: L. dimidiatus

Binomial name
- Labeobarbus dimidiatus (Tweddle & Skelton, 1998)

Synonyms
- Varicorhinus dimidiatus Tweddle & Skelton, 1998

Species of fish

Labeobarbus dimidiatus is a species of ray-finned fish in the family Cyprinidae. It is endemic to the Ruo River in Malawi.
