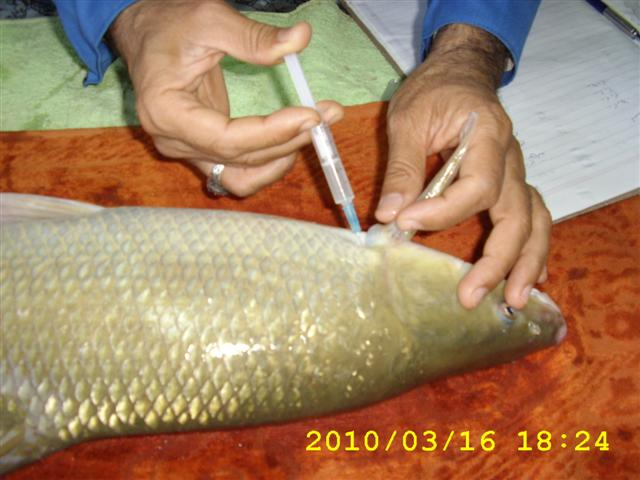

Conservation status
- Least Concern (IUCN 3.1)

Scientific classification
- Domain: Eukaryota
- Kingdom: Animalia
- Phylum: Chordata
- Class: Actinopterygii
- Order: Cypriniformes
- Family: Cyprinidae
- Genus: Labeobarbus
- Species: L. compiniei

Binomial name
- Labeobarbus compiniei (Sauvage, 1879)

Synonyms
- Barynotus compiniei Sauvage, 1879; Barbus compiniei (Sauvage, 1879); Barbus labiatomimus Pellegrin, 1914

= Labeobarbus compiniei =

Species of fish

Labeobarbus compiniei is a species of cyprinid fish native to Gabon and the Republic of Congo in Africa.
