= Labeobarbus mawambiensis =

Conservation status
- Least Concern (IUCN 3.1)

Scientific classification
- Domain: Eukaryota
- Kingdom: Animalia
- Phylum: Chordata
- Class: Actinopterygii
- Order: Cypriniformes
- Family: Cyprinidae
- Subfamily: Torinae
- Genus: Labeobarbus
- Species: L. mawambiensis

Binomial name
- Labeobarbus mawambiensis Steindachner, 1911

Synonyms
- Barbus mawambiensis Steindachner, 1911

Species of fish

Labeobarbus mawambiensis is a species of ray-finned fish in the genus Labeobarbus from the central Congo Basin in Cameroon, the Republic of the Congo and The Democratic Republic of the Congo.
