= Labeobarbus lagensis =

Scientific classification
- Domain: Eukaryota
- Kingdom: Animalia
- Phylum: Chordata
- Class: Actinopterygii
- Order: Cypriniformes
- Family: Cyprinidae
- Subfamily: Torinae
- Genus: Labeobarbus
- Species: L. lagensis

Binomial name
- Labeobarbus lagensis (Günther, 1868)

Synonyms
- Barynotus lagensis Günther, 1868; Barbellion lagensis (Günther, 1868); Barbus lagensis (Günther, 1868)

Species of fish

Labeobarbus lagensis is a species of ray-finned fish in the genus Labeobarbus from Nigeria and possibly Ghana.
