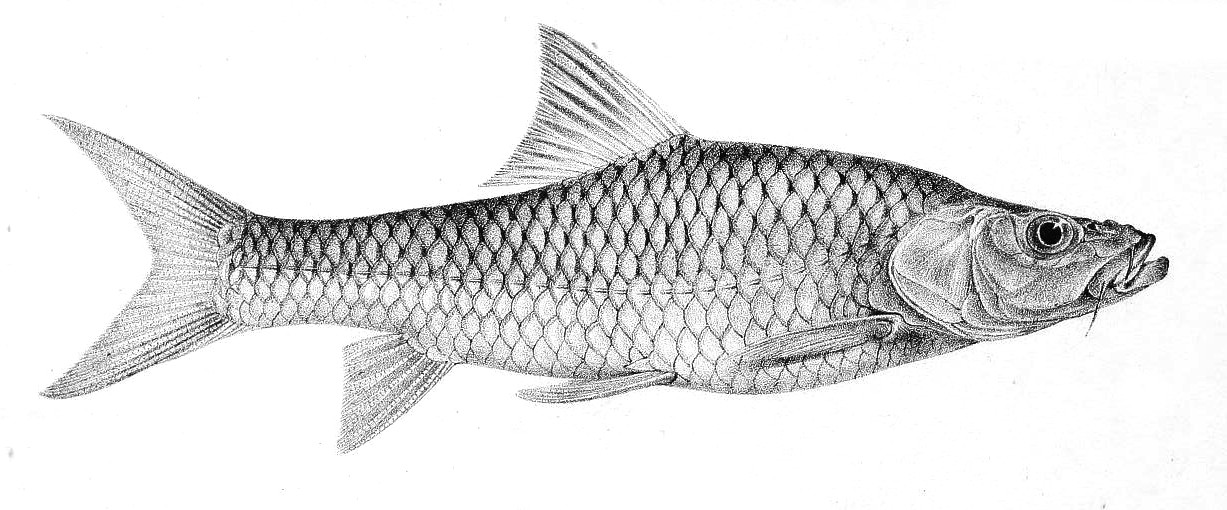

Conservation status
- Least Concern (IUCN 3.1)

Scientific classification
- Domain: Eukaryota
- Kingdom: Animalia
- Phylum: Chordata
- Class: Actinopterygii
- Order: Cypriniformes
- Family: Cyprinidae
- Subfamily: Torinae
- Genus: Labeobarbus
- Species: L. progenys

Binomial name
- Labeobarbus progenys (Boulenger, 1903)

Synonyms
- Barbus progenys Boulenger, 1903

= Labeobarbus progenys =

Species of fish

Labeobarbus progenys is a species of cyprinid fish found in the African countries of Cameroon and West Congo, as well as a questionable presence in Angola.
