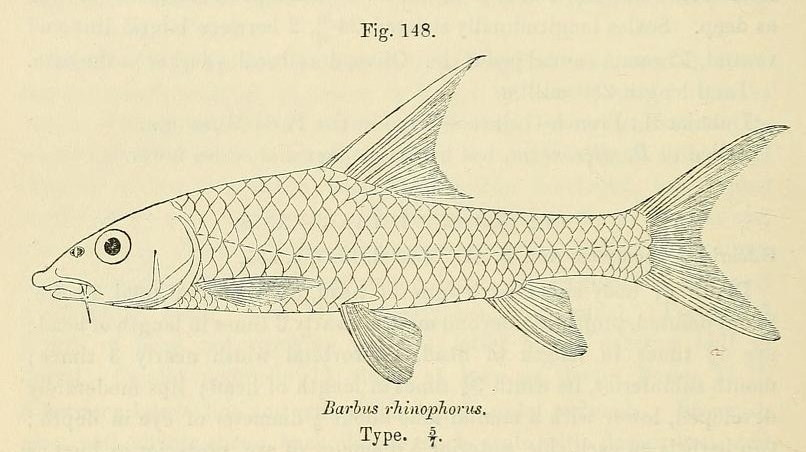

Scientific classification
- Domain: Eukaryota
- Kingdom: Animalia
- Phylum: Chordata
- Class: Actinopterygii
- Order: Cypriniformes
- Family: Cyprinidae
- Subfamily: Torinae
- Genus: Labeobarbus
- Species: L. rhinophorus

Binomial name
- Labeobarbus rhinophorus (Boulenger, 1910)

Synonyms
- Barbus rhinophorus

= Labeobarbus rhinophorus =

Species of fish

Labeobarbus rhinophorus is a species of ray-finned fish in the genus Labeobarbus is endemic to the Lucalla River in Angola.
