= Pungwe chiselmouth =

Scientific classification
- Domain: Eukaryota
- Kingdom: Animalia
- Phylum: Chordata
- Class: Actinopterygii
- Order: Cypriniformes
- Family: Cyprinidae
- Subfamily: Torinae
- Genus: Labeobarbus
- Species: L. pungweensis

Binomial name
- Labeobarbus pungweensis (Jubb, 1959)

Synonyms
- Varicorhinus pungweensis

Species of fish

The Pungwe chiselmouth (Labeobarbus pungweensis) is a species of ray-finned fish in the genus Labeobarbus is found in the Pungwe River and Buzi River in Zimbabwe and Mozambique, and the Ruo River in Malawi.
