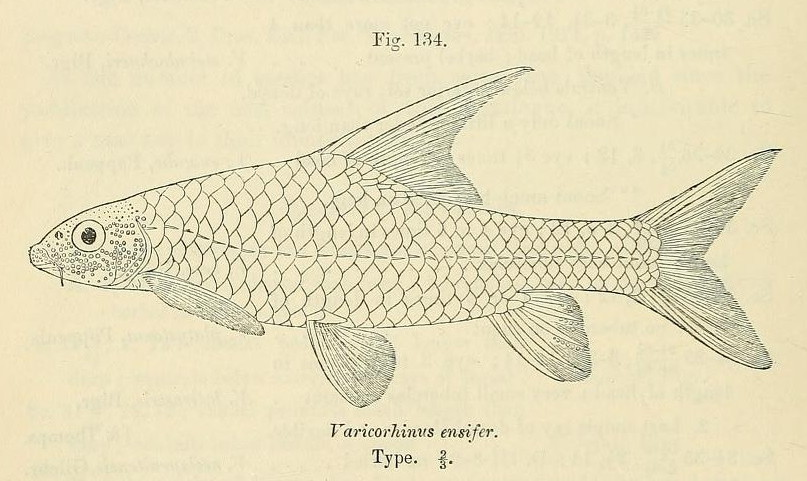

Scientific classification
- Domain: Eukaryota
- Kingdom: Animalia
- Phylum: Chordata
- Class: Actinopterygii
- Order: Cypriniformes
- Family: Cyprinidae
- Subfamily: Torinae
- Genus: Labeobarbus
- Species: L. ensifer

Binomial name
- Labeobarbus ensifer Boulenger, 1910

Synonyms
- Varicorhinus ensifer

= Labeobarbus ensifer =

Species of fish

Labeobarbus ensifer is a species of ray-finned fish in the family Cyprinidae. It is endemic to the Cuanza River basin in Angola.
