= Labeobarbus macroceps =

Conservation status
- Data Deficient (IUCN 3.1)

Scientific classification
- Kingdom: Animalia
- Phylum: Chordata
- Class: Actinopterygii
- Order: Cypriniformes
- Family: Cyprinidae
- Subfamily: Torinae
- Genus: Labeobarbus
- Species: L. macroceps

Binomial name
- Labeobarbus macroceps CFowler, 1936)

Synonyms
- Barbus macroceps Fowler, 1936

Species of fish

Labeobarbus macroceps is a species of ray-finned fish in the genus Labeobarbus from The Democratic Republic of the Congo.

== Footnotes ==
- Froese, Rainer; Pauly, Daniel (eds.). "Labeobarbus macroceps". FishBase.
