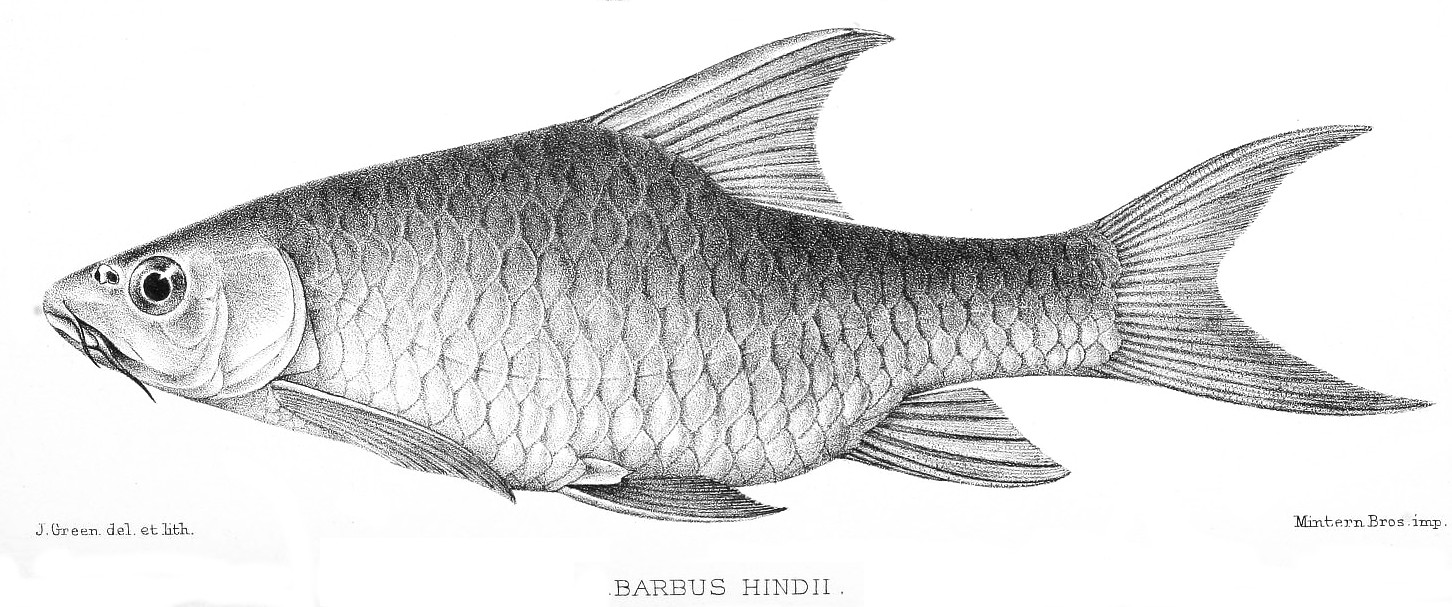

Conservation status
- Least Concern (IUCN 3.1)

Scientific classification
- Kingdom: Animalia
- Phylum: Chordata
- Class: Actinopterygii
- Order: Cypriniformes
- Family: Cyprinidae
- Genus: Labeobarbus
- Species: L. oxyrhynchus

Binomial name
- Labeobarbus oxyrhynchus (Pfeffer, 1889)

Synonyms
- Barbus oxyrhynchus Pfeffer, 1889; Barbus tanensis Günther, 1894; Barbus hindii Boulenger, 1902; Barbus perplexicans Boulenger, 1902; Barbus labiatus Boulenger, 1902; Barbus krapfi Boulenger, 1911; Barbus mathoiae Boulenger, 1911; Barbus ahlselli Lönnberg, 1911; Barbus athi Hubbs, 1918; Barbus babaulti Pellegrin, 1926; Barbus nairobi Holly, 1928; Barbus donyensis Holly, 1929

= Pangani barb =

Species of fish

The Pangani barb (Labeobarbus oxyrhynchus) is a species of cyprinid fish.

It is found in Kenya and Tanzania. Its natural habitat is rivers. It is not considered a threatened species by the IUCN.
