= Labeobarbus iturii =

Conservation status
- Data Deficient (IUCN 3.1)

Scientific classification
- Kingdom: Animalia
- Phylum: Chordata
- Class: Actinopterygii
- Order: Cypriniformes
- Family: Cyprinidae
- Subfamily: Torinae
- Genus: Labeobarbus
- Species: L. iturii

Binomial name
- Labeobarbus iturii (Holly, 1929)

Synonyms
- Barbus iturii Holly, 1929

Species of fish

Labeobarbus iturii is a species of ray-finned fish in the genus Labeobarbus which is found only in the Ituri River in The Democratic Republic of the Congo.
