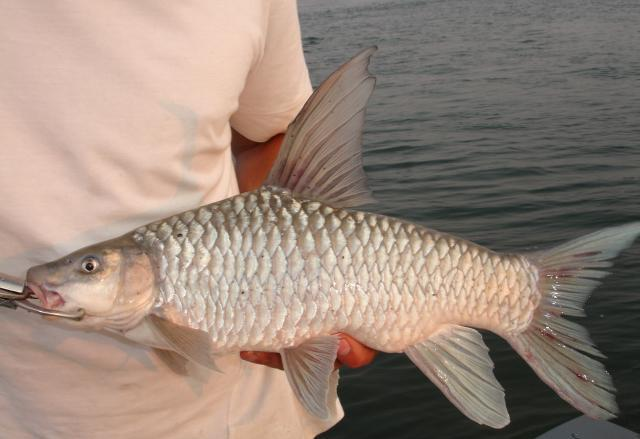

Conservation status
- Least Concern (IUCN 3.1)

Scientific classification
- Domain: Eukaryota
- Kingdom: Animalia
- Phylum: Chordata
- Class: Actinopterygii
- Order: Cypriniformes
- Family: Cyprinidae
- Subfamily: Torinae
- Genus: Labeobarbus
- Species: L. codringtonii

Binomial name
- Labeobarbus codringtonii (Boulenger, 1908)

Synonyms
- Barbus codringtonii Boulenger, 1908; Barbus altidorsalis Boulenger, 1908; Barbus chilotes Boulenger, 1908; Barbus hypostomatus Pellegrin, 1936

= Upper Zambezi yellowfish =

Species of fish

The Upper Zambezi yellowfish, Labeobarbus codringtonii, is commonly found throughout the Zambezi and Okavango Rivers in Southern Africa. They prefer fast flowing water over cobble and rocky bottoms where they predominantly feed on aquatic insects and crustaceans. Their exaggerated fins help them manoeuvre in the fast water and they are powerful swimmers. The Zambezi yellowfish is highly sought after by sport anglers and fly fishing is the preferred method of catching them.
