= Labeobarbus jubbi =

Conservation status
- Data Deficient (IUCN 3.1)

Scientific classification
- Domain: Eukaryota
- Kingdom: Animalia
- Phylum: Chordata
- Class: Actinopterygii
- Order: Cypriniformes
- Family: Cyprinidae
- Subfamily: Torinae
- Genus: Labeobarbus
- Species: L. jubbi

Binomial name
- Labeobarbus jubbi (Poll, 1967)

Synonyms
- Barbus jubbi Poll, 1967

Species of fish

Labeobarbus jubbi is a species of ray-finned fish in the genus Labeobarbus from the central Congo Basin in Angola and The Democratic Republic of the Congo. It may be threatened by pollution and sediment runoff from diamond mining activities in its area of occurrence. It is fished for in artisanal fisheries.
