= Labeobarbus werneri =

Scientific classification
- Kingdom: Animalia
- Phylum: Chordata
- Class: Actinopterygii
- Order: Cypriniformes
- Family: Cyprinidae
- Subfamily: Torinae
- Genus: Labeobarbus
- Species: L. werneri

Binomial name
- Labeobarbus werneri (Holly, 1929)

Synonyms
- Varicorhinus werneri

Species of fish

Labeobarbus werneri is a species of ray-finned fish in the genus Labeobarbus is found in Africa.
