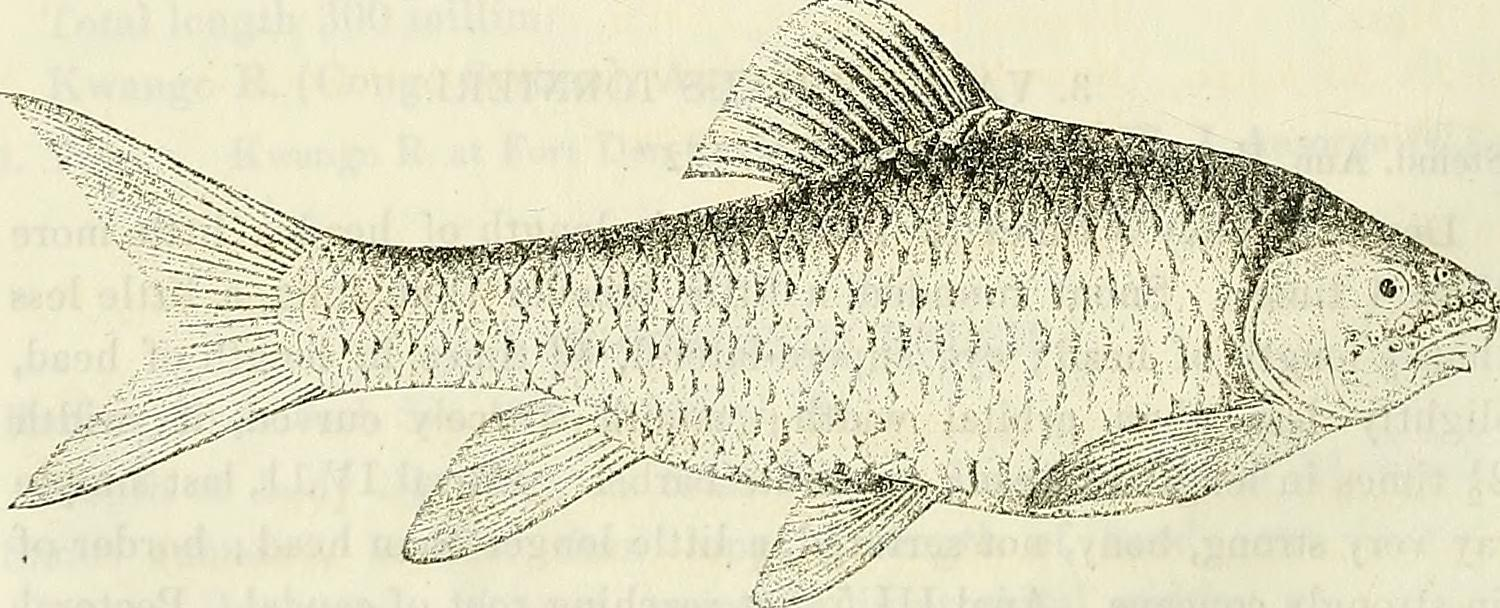

Conservation status
- Least Concern (IUCN 3.1)

Scientific classification
- Domain: Eukaryota
- Kingdom: Animalia
- Phylum: Chordata
- Class: Actinopterygii
- Order: Cypriniformes
- Family: Cyprinidae
- Subfamily: Torinae
- Genus: Labeobarbus
- Species: L. beso

Binomial name
- Labeobarbus beso (Rüppell, 1835)

Synonyms
- Barbus beso; Capoeta beso; Capoeta dillonii; Chondrostoma dillonii; Dillonia abyssinica; Dillonia dillonii; Systomus beso; Varicorhinus beso

= African scraping feeder =

Species of fish

The African scraping feeder (Labeobarbus beso) is a species of ray-finned fish in the family Cyprinidae. It is found in Lake Tana, and the Blue Nile and Awash River systems in Africa. It feeds by scraping algae off from the bottom with its mouth.
