= Labeobarbus nthuwa =

Scientific classification
- Kingdom: Animalia
- Phylum: Chordata
- Class: Actinopterygii
- Order: Cypriniformes
- Family: Cyprinidae
- Subfamily: Torinae
- Genus: Labeobarbus
- Species: L. nthuwa

Binomial name
- Labeobarbus nthuwa Tweddle & P. H. Skelton, 2008

Species of fish

Labeobarbus nthuwa is a species of cyprinid fish in the genus Labeobarbus which is found only in the South Rukuru River in northern Malawi.
