= Labeobarbus mbami =

Conservation status
- Endangered (IUCN 3.1)

Scientific classification
- Kingdom: Animalia
- Phylum: Chordata
- Class: Actinopterygii
- Order: Cypriniformes
- Family: Cyprinidae
- Subfamily: Torinae
- Genus: Labeobarbus
- Species: L. mbami

Binomial name
- Labeobarbus mbami (Holly, 1927)

Synonyms
- Barbus mbami Holly, 1927

Species of fish

Labeobarbus mbami is a species of cyprinid fish endemic to the Sanaga River basin in Cameroon.
