= Labeobarbus micronema =

Conservation status
- Least Concern (IUCN 3.1)

Scientific classification
- Domain: Eukaryota
- Kingdom: Animalia
- Phylum: Chordata
- Class: Actinopterygii
- Order: Cypriniformes
- Family: Cyprinidae
- Subfamily: Torinae
- Genus: Labeobarbus
- Species: L. micronema

Binomial name
- Labeobarbus micronema (Boulenger, 1904)

Synonyms
- Barbus micronema Boulenger, 1904

Species of fish

Labeobarbus micronema is a species of cyprinid fish native to Cameroon and Gabon in Africa. It is found in the Sanaga, Nyong, Kribi and Ivindo rivers.
