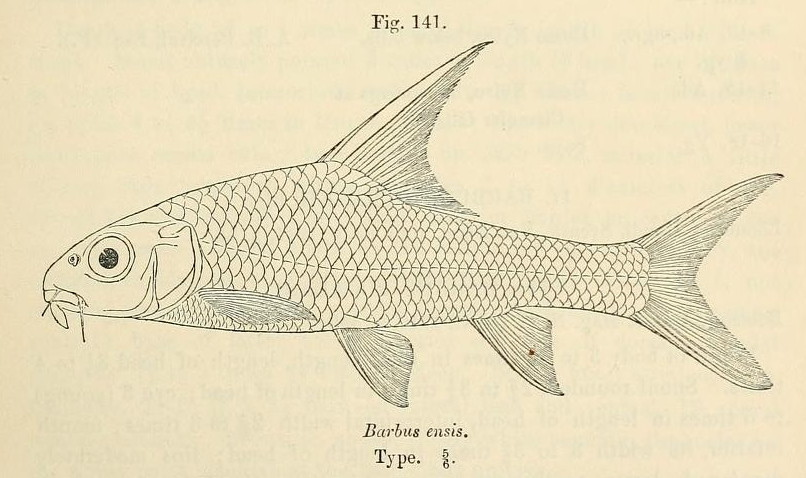

Conservation status
- Least Concern (IUCN 3.1)

Scientific classification
- Kingdom: Animalia
- Phylum: Chordata
- Class: Actinopterygii
- Order: Cypriniformes
- Family: Cyprinidae
- Subfamily: Torinae
- Genus: Labeobarbus
- Species: L. ensis

Binomial name
- Labeobarbus ensis (Boulenger, 1910)

Synonyms
- Barbus ensis Boulenger, 1910; Enteromius ensis (Boulenger, 1910)

= Labeobarbus ensis =

Species of fish

Labeobarbus ensis is a species of freshwater ray-finned fish belonging to the family Cyprinidae, the carps, barbs and related fishes. This species is endemic to Angola.
