= Labeobarbus stappersii =

Scientific classification
- Domain: Eukaryota
- Kingdom: Animalia
- Phylum: Chordata
- Class: Actinopterygii
- Order: Cypriniformes
- Family: Cyprinidae
- Subfamily: Torinae
- Genus: Labeobarbus
- Species: L. stappersii

Binomial name
- Labeobarbus stappersii (Boulenger, 1915)

Synonyms
- Barbus stappersii; Barbus curtus; Barbus moeruensis; Barbus oxycephalus

Species of fish

Labeobarbus stappersii is a species of ray-finned fish in the genus Labeobarbus is found in Lake Mweru and the Luapula River in the Democratic Republic of the Congo and Zambia.
