= Labeobarbus platyrhinus =

Scientific classification
- Domain: Eukaryota
- Kingdom: Animalia
- Phylum: Chordata
- Class: Actinopterygii
- Order: Cypriniformes
- Family: Cyprinidae
- Genus: Labeobarbus
- Species: L. platyrhinus

Binomial name
- Labeobarbus platyrhinus Boulenger, 1900

Synonyms
- Barbus platyrhinus Boulenger, 1900

Species of fish

Labeobarbus platyrhinus is a species of ray-finned fish in the genus Labeobarbus which is endemic to Lake Tanganyika and its drainage basin.
