= Labeobarbus tornieri =

Scientific classification
- Domain: Eukaryota
- Kingdom: Animalia
- Phylum: Chordata
- Class: Actinopterygii
- Order: Cypriniformes
- Family: Cyprinidae
- Subfamily: Torinae
- Genus: Labeobarbus
- Species: L. tornieri

Binomial name
- Labeobarbus tornieri (Steindachner, 1906)

Synonyms
- Varicorhinus tornieri

Species of fish

Labeobarbus tornieri is a species of ray-finned fish in the genus Labeobarbus is found in Cameroon, Equatorial Guinea, and Gabon.
