= Labeobarbus macrolepidotus =

Scientific classification
- Domain: Eukaryota
- Kingdom: Animalia
- Phylum: Chordata
- Class: Actinopterygii
- Order: Cypriniformes
- Family: Cyprinidae
- Subfamily: Torinae
- Genus: Labeobarbus
- Species: L. macrolepidotus

Binomial name
- Labeobarbus macrolepidotus (Pellegrin, 1928)

Synonyms
- Varicorhinus macrolepidotus; Barbus callewaerti

Species of fish

Labeobarbus macrolepidotus is a species of ray-finned fish in the genus Labeobarbus which is found in the lower Congo River and the Kasai River in the Democratic Republic of the Congo and Angola.
