= Labeobarbus brauni =

Scientific classification
- Kingdom: Animalia
- Phylum: Chordata
- Class: Actinopterygii
- Order: Cypriniformes
- Family: Cyprinidae
- Subfamily: Torinae
- Genus: Labeobarbus
- Species: L. brauni

Binomial name
- Labeobarbus brauni (Pellegrin, 1935)

Synonyms
- Varicorhinus brauni

Species of fish

Labeobarbus brauni is a species of ray-finned fish in the family Cyprinidae. It is endemic to the Luhoho River system in the Democratic Republic of the Congo.
