= Labeobarbus versluysii =

Conservation status
- Least Concern (IUCN 3.1)

Scientific classification
- Kingdom: Animalia
- Phylum: Chordata
- Class: Actinopterygii
- Order: Cypriniformes
- Family: Cyprinidae
- Subfamily: Torinae
- Genus: Labeobarbus
- Species: L. versluysii

Binomial name
- Labeobarbus versluysii (Holly, 1929)

Synonyms
- Barbus versluysii Holly, 1929

Species of fish

Labeobarbus versluysii is a species of cyprinid fish endemic to Cameroon in the Wouri, Sanaga and Nyong river basins.
