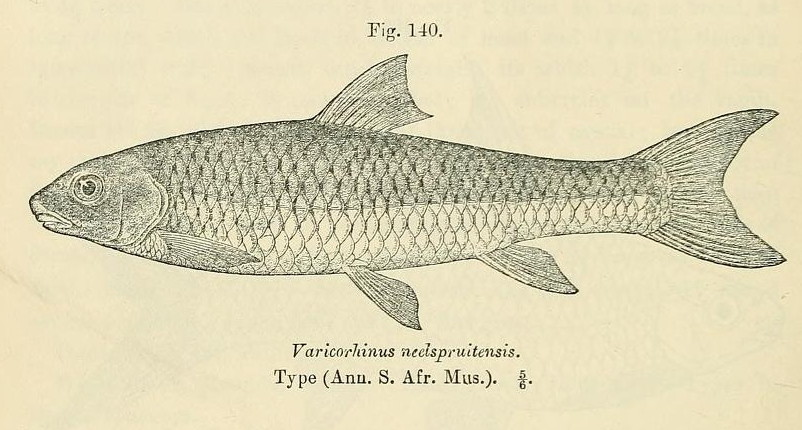

Conservation status
- Near Threatened (IUCN 3.1)

Scientific classification
- Kingdom: Animalia
- Phylum: Chordata
- Class: Actinopterygii
- Order: Cypriniformes
- Family: Cyprinidae
- Subfamily: Torinae
- Genus: Labeobarbus
- Species: L. nelspruitensis

Binomial name
- Labeobarbus nelspruitensis (Gilchrist & Thompson, 1911)

Synonyms
- Varicorhinus nelspruitensis

= Incomati chiselmouth =

Species of fish

The Incomati chiselmouth (Labeobarbus nelspruitensis) is a species of ray-finned fish in the genus Labeobarbus which is endemic to the Incomati and Pongolo river systems in Mozambique and South Africa.
