= Labeobarbus caudovittatus =

Conservation status
- Least Concern (IUCN 3.1)

Scientific classification
- Domain: Eukaryota
- Kingdom: Animalia
- Phylum: Chordata
- Class: Actinopterygii
- Order: Cypriniformes
- Family: Cyprinidae
- Subfamily: Torinae
- Genus: Labeobarbus
- Species: L. caudovittatus

Binomial name
- Labeobarbus caudovittatus (Boulenger, 1902)

Synonyms
- Barbus caudovittatus Boulenger, 1902; Varicorhinus stappersii Boulenger, 1917; Barbus euchilus Boulenger, 1920; Barbus miochilus Boulenger, 1920; Barbus lestradei David, 1936

Species of fish

Labeobarbus caudovittatus is a species of cyprinid fish in the genus Labeobarbus which occurs across a wide area of central Africa from Gabon in the west to Tanzania in the east.
