= Labeobarbus urotaenia =

Conservation status
- Data Deficient (IUCN 3.1)

Scientific classification
- Kingdom: Animalia
- Phylum: Chordata
- Class: Actinopterygii
- Order: Cypriniformes
- Family: Cyprinidae
- Subfamily: Torinae
- Genus: Labeobarbus
- Species: L. urotaenia

Binomial name
- Labeobarbus urotaenia (Boulenger, 1913)

Synonyms
- Barbus urotaenia Boulenger, 1913

Species of fish

Labeobarbus urotaenia is a species of ray-finned fish in the genus Labeobarbus from the central Congo River system.
