= Labeobarbus petitjeani =

Conservation status
- Least Concern (IUCN 3.1)

Scientific classification
- Kingdom: Animalia
- Phylum: Chordata
- Class: Actinopterygii
- Division: Teleostei
- Order: Cypriniformes
- Family: Cyprinidae
- Subfamily: Torinae
- Genus: Labeobarbus
- Species: L. petitjeani

Binomial name
- Labeobarbus petitjeani (Daget, 1962)

Synonyms
- Barbus petitjeani Daget, 1962

Species of fish

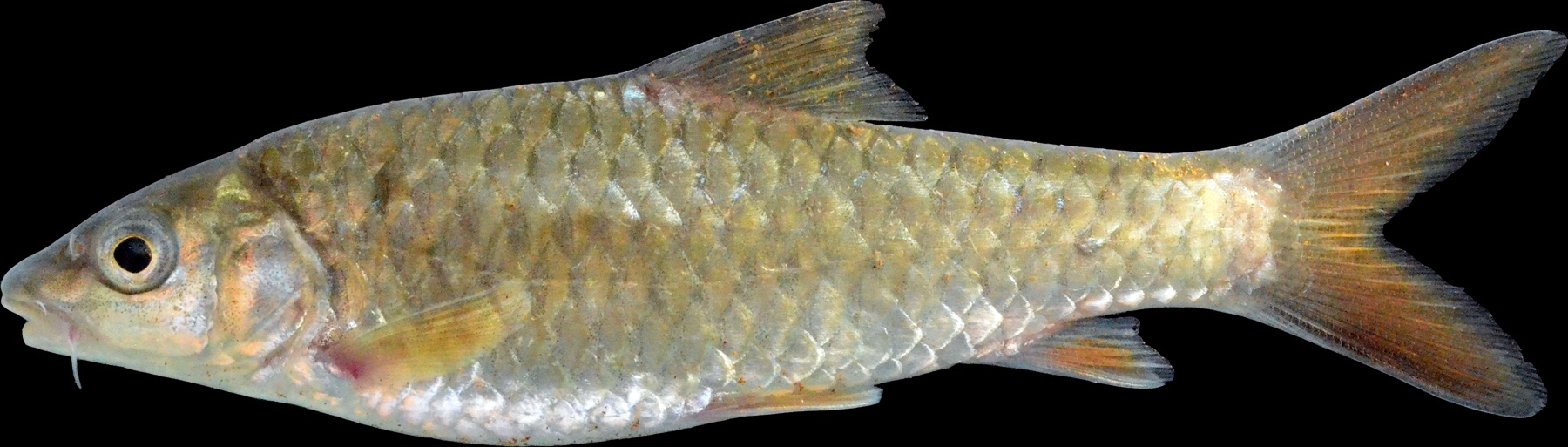

Labeobarbus petitjeani is a species of ray-finned fish in the genus Labeobarbus from the upper Senegal River basin in Guinea.
