= Labeobarbus dartevellei =

Conservation status
- Data Deficient (IUCN 3.1)

Scientific classification
- Kingdom: Animalia
- Phylum: Chordata
- Class: Actinopterygii
- Order: Cypriniformes
- Family: Cyprinidae
- Subfamily: Torinae
- Genus: Labeobarbus
- Species: L. dartevellei

Binomial name
- Labeobarbus dartevellei Poll, 1945

Synonyms
- Barbus dartevellei Poll, 1945

Species of fish

Labeobarbus dartevellei is a species of cyprinid fish in the genus Labeobarbus which has not been recorded since the type specimen was collected in the Democratic Republic of the Congo.
