= Labeobarbus gestetneri =

Conservation status
- Data Deficient (IUCN 3.1)

Scientific classification
- Kingdom: Animalia
- Phylum: Chordata
- Class: Actinopterygii
- Order: Cypriniformes
- Family: Cyprinidae
- Subfamily: Torinae
- Genus: Labeobarbus
- Species: L. gestetneri

Binomial name
- Labeobarbus gestetneri (Banister & R. G. Bailey, 1979)

Synonyms
- Barbus gestetneri Banister & Bailey, 1979

Species of fish

Labeobarbus gestetneri is a species of ray-finned fish in the genus Labeobarbus.
