= Labeobarbus habereri =

Conservation status
- Least Concern (IUCN 3.1)

Scientific classification
- Domain: Eukaryota
- Kingdom: Animalia
- Phylum: Chordata
- Class: Actinopterygii
- Order: Cypriniformes
- Family: Cyprinidae
- Subfamily: Torinae
- Genus: Labeobarbus
- Species: L. habereri

Binomial name
- Labeobarbus habereri (Steindachner, 1912)

Synonyms
- Barbus habereri Steindachner, 1912

Species of fish

Labeobarbus habereri is a species of Cyprinid fish endemic to Cameroon in Africa.
