= Labeobarbus upembensis =

Scientific classification
- Kingdom: Animalia
- Phylum: Chordata
- Class: Actinopterygii
- Order: Cypriniformes
- Family: Cyprinidae
- Subfamily: Torinae
- Genus: Labeobarbus
- Species: L. upembensis

Binomial name
- Labeobarbus upembensis (Banister & R. G. Bailey, 1979)

Synonyms
- Varicorhinus upembensis

Species of fish

Labeobarbus upembensis is a species of ray-finned fish in the genus Labeobarbus is endemic to the Kalumengonga River in the Democratic Republic of the Congo.
