= Labeobarbus tropidolepis =

Conservation status
- Least Concern (IUCN 3.1)

Scientific classification
- Kingdom: Animalia
- Phylum: Chordata
- Class: Actinopterygii
- Order: Cypriniformes
- Family: Cyprinidae
- Subfamily: Torinae
- Genus: Labeobarbus
- Species: L. tropidolepis

Binomial name
- Labeobarbus tropidolepis (Boulenger, 1900)

Synonyms
- Barbus tropidolepis Boulenger, 1900

Species of fish

Labeobarbus tropidolepis is a species of ray-finned fish in the family Cyprinidae. It is found in Burundi and Tanzania where it is endemic to the Lake Tanganyika basin. Its natural habitats are rivers, freshwater lakes, freshwater marshes, and inland deltas. It is not considered a threatened species by the IUCN.
