= Labeobarbus latirostris =

Scientific classification
- Domain: Eukaryota
- Kingdom: Animalia
- Phylum: Chordata
- Class: Actinopterygii
- Order: Cypriniformes
- Family: Cyprinidae
- Subfamily: Torinae
- Genus: Labeobarbus
- Species: L. latirostris

Binomial name
- Labeobarbus latirostris (Keilhack, 1908)

Synonyms
- Barbus brevicauda; Barbus eurystomus; Barbus intermedius latirostris

Species of fish

Labeobarbus latirostris is a species of ray-finned fish in the genus Labeobarbus which is found in the Lake Malawi basin in Africa.
