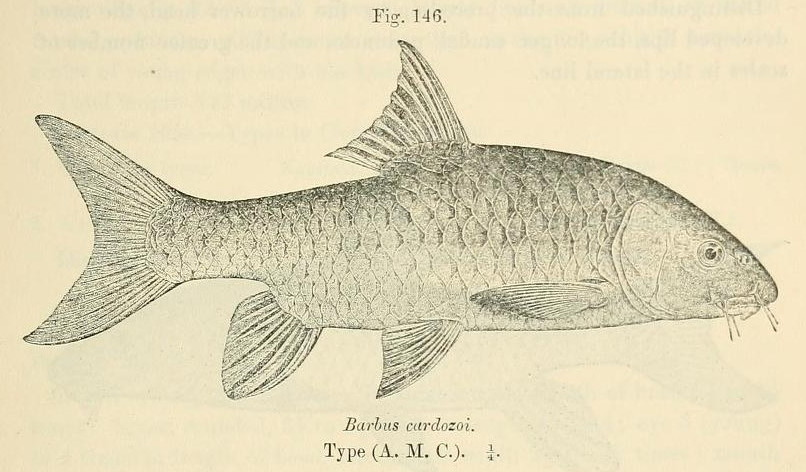

Conservation status
- Least Concern (IUCN 3.1)

Scientific classification
- Domain: Eukaryota
- Kingdom: Animalia
- Phylum: Chordata
- Class: Actinopterygii
- Order: Cypriniformes
- Family: Cyprinidae
- Subfamily: Torinae
- Genus: Labeobarbus
- Species: L. cardozoi

Binomial name
- Labeobarbus cardozoi (Boulenger, 1912)

Synonyms
- Barbus cardozoi Boulenger, 1912

= Labeobarbus cardozoi =

Species of fish

Labeobarbus cardozoi is a species of cyprinid fish found in the Democratic Republic of the Congo and Angola in Africa.
