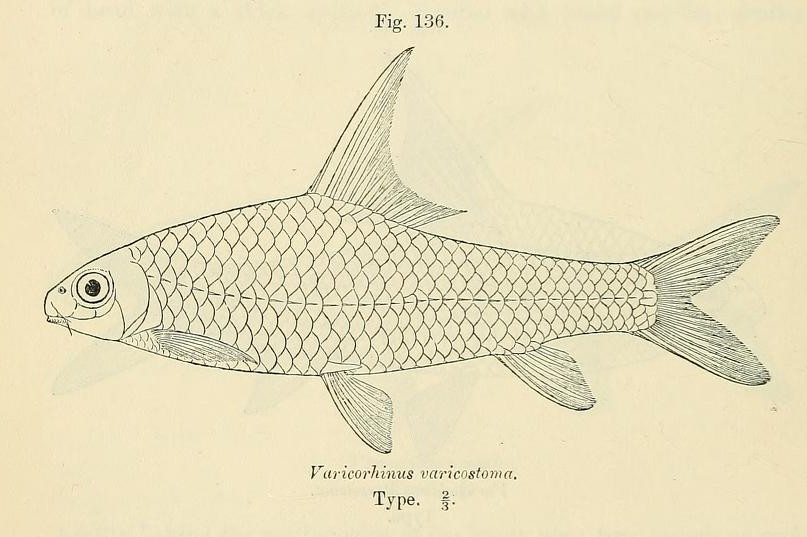

Scientific classification
- Kingdom: Animalia
- Phylum: Chordata
- Class: Actinopterygii
- Order: Cypriniformes
- Family: Cyprinidae
- Subfamily: Torinae
- Genus: Labeobarbus
- Species: L. varicostoma

Binomial name
- Labeobarbus varicostoma (Boulenger, 1910)

Synonyms
- Varicorhinus varicostoma

= Labeobarbus varicostoma =

Species of fish

Labeobarbus varicostoma is a species of ray-finned fish belonging to the genus Labeobarbus is endemic to the Lucalla River in Angola.
