= Labeobarbus pagenstecheri =

Conservation status
- Data Deficient (IUCN 3.1)

Scientific classification
- Kingdom: Animalia
- Phylum: Chordata
- Class: Actinopterygii
- Order: Cypriniformes
- Family: Cyprinidae
- Subfamily: Torinae
- Genus: Labeobarbus
- Species: L. pagenstecheri

Binomial name
- Labeobarbus pagenstecheri (Fischer, 1884)

Synonyms
- Barbus pagenstecheri Fischer, 1884

Species of fish

Labeobarbus pagenstecheri is a species of ray-finned fish in the family Cyprinidae. It is found only in the Kilimanjaro Region, an area on the border between Kenya and Tanzania. Its natural habitats are streams and intermittent rivers. Its status is insufficiently known.
