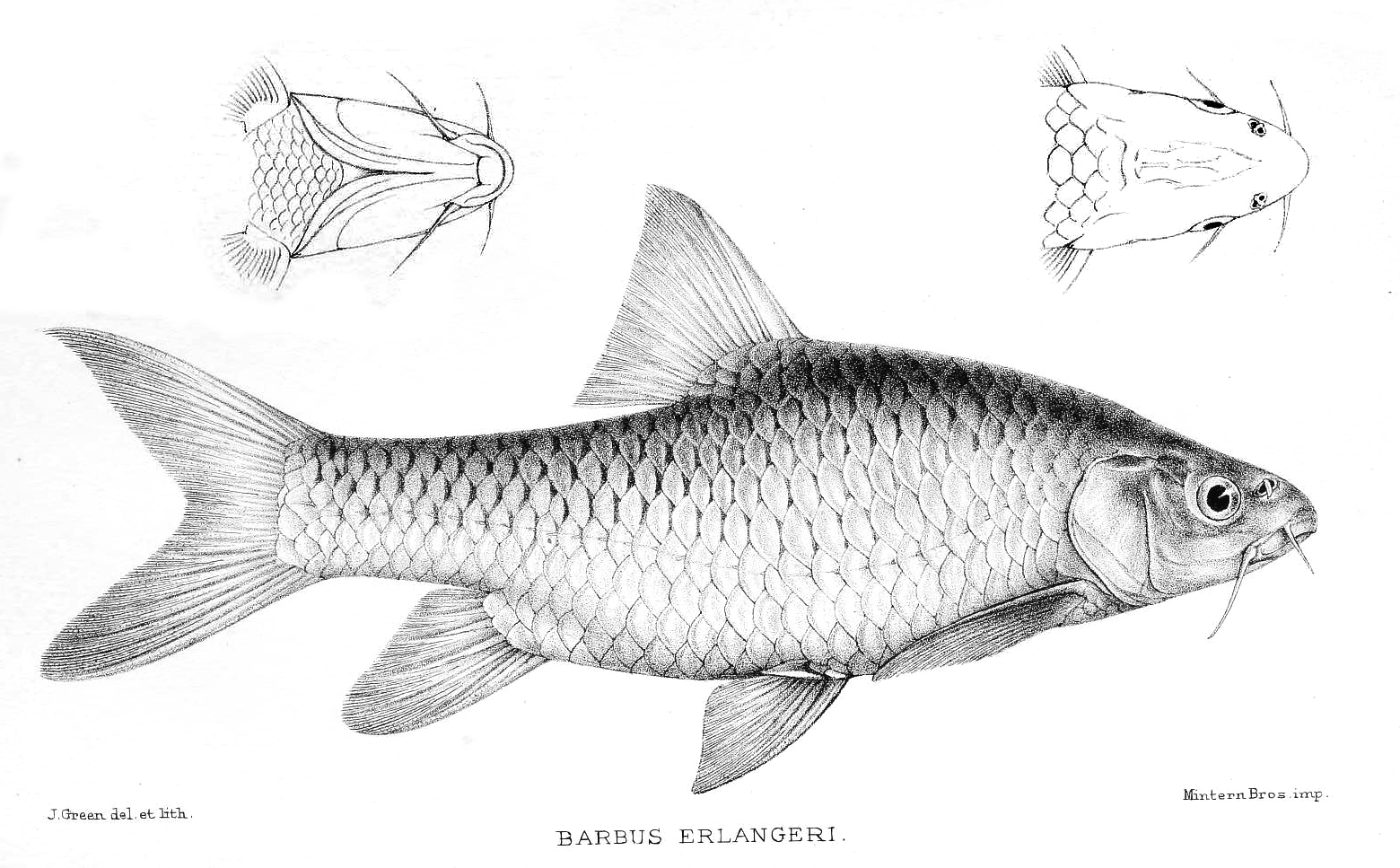

Conservation status
- Least Concern (IUCN 3.1)

Scientific classification
- Kingdom: Animalia
- Phylum: Chordata
- Class: Actinopterygii
- Order: Cypriniformes
- Family: Cyprinidae
- Subfamily: Torinae
- Genus: Labeobarbus
- Species: L. intermedius

Binomial name
- Labeobarbus intermedius (Rüppell, 1835)

Synonyms
- Many, see text

= Labeobarbus intermedius =

Species of fish

Labeobarbus intermedius is an East African ray-finned fish species in the family Cyprinidae. Like the closely related yellowfish, it is hexaploid. A large species, the maximum recorded standard length is nearly 50 cm (20 in). This species has a subspecies named Labeobarbus intermedius intermedius.

== Systematics and taxonomy ==
The year of its first description – as Barbus intermedius – was for some time erroneously reported as 1837. L. intermedius was still placed by most modern authors in the "wastebin genus" Barbus by default, and the IUCN still does so until a thorough taxonomic revision of the African "barbs" is published. However, the species is increasingly being restored to the related yellowfish genus Labeobarbus, which seems a much more appropriate placement. It is a close relative of Labeobarbus bynni, another African "barb".

No subspecies are recognized at present. The population from the Barino River basin invalidly described as L. i. australis is identical to the earlier-named gregorii, but probably not sufficiently distinct from its conspecifics to consider it a separate taxon. The same holds true for the supposed subspecies leptosoma and microstoma. Important junior synonyms of this species are:

- Barbus erlangeri Boulenger, 1903
- Barbus gregorii Boulenger, 1902
- Barbus intermedius Rüppell, 1835
- Barbus intermedius intermedius Rüppell, 1835
- Barbus intermedius australis Banister, 1973
- Barbus intermedius leptosoma Boulenger, 1902
- Barbus intermedius microstoma Boulenger, 1902
- Barbus plagiostomus Bini, 1940
- Labeobarbus intermedius australis (Banister, 1973)
- Luciobarbus elongatus (Rüppell, 1836)

Its close relatives L. brevicauda, L. gorgorensis and L. johnstonii (under the name latirostris), and even the rather distinct Barbus eurystomus, were for some time placed in "B." intermedius as subspecies too. But are considered distinct species today. B. procatopus is sometimes believed to refer to the present species, but it is actually a junior synonym of the ripon barbel (B. altianalis).

== Distribution and ecology ==
This freshwater fish is found in Kenya, Tanzania, Uganda and southern Ethiopia. Its natural habitats are the Kerio, Suguta, Turkwel and northern Ewaso Ng'iro Rivers and their tributaries, as well as Lake Baringo, Bogoria and Turkana and their associated rivers. The records from the Tana River region are based on mislabelled specimens, while the supposed records from the Mara River and Lake Victoria appear to be based on misidentifications of the Ripon Barbel.

Little is known about its population and ecology, but given its wide range and lack of readily apparent threats, it is not considered a threatened species by the IUCN.
