= Labeobarbus macrolepis =

Conservation status
- Near Threatened (IUCN 3.1)

Scientific classification
- Kingdom: Animalia
- Phylum: Chordata
- Class: Actinopterygii
- Order: Cypriniformes
- Family: Cyprinidae
- Subfamily: Torinae
- Genus: Labeobarbus
- Species: L. macrolepis

Binomial name
- Labeobarbus macrolepis (Pfeffer, 1889)

Synonyms
- Barbus macrolepis Pfeffer, 1889

Species of fish

Labeobarbus macrolepis is a species of ray-finned fish in the family Cyprinidae. It is found in Burundi and Tanzania. Its natural habitats are rivers, freshwater lakes, freshwater marshes, and inland deltas. It is becoming rare due to habitat loss.
