= Labeobarbus leleupanus =

Conservation status
- Vulnerable (IUCN 3.1)

Scientific classification
- Kingdom: Animalia
- Phylum: Chordata
- Class: Actinopterygii
- Order: Cypriniformes
- Family: Cyprinidae
- Subfamily: Torinae
- Genus: Labeobarbus
- Species: L. leleupanus

Binomial name
- Labeobarbus leleupanus Matthes, 1959

Synonyms
- Varicorhinus leleupanus Matthes, 1959

Species of fish

Labeobarbus leleupanus is a species of ray-finned fish in the family Cyprinidae. It is found only in Burundi. Its natural habitats are rivers, freshwater lakes, and inland deltas.
