= Labeobarbus pojeri =

Scientific classification
- Kingdom: Animalia
- Phylum: Chordata
- Class: Actinopterygii
- Order: Cypriniformes
- Family: Cyprinidae
- Subfamily: Torinae
- Genus: Labeobarbus
- Species: L. pojeri

Binomial name
- Labeobarbus pojeri (Poll, 1944)

Synonyms
- Barbus pojeri

Species of fish

Labeobarbus pojeri is a species of ray-finned fish in the genus Labeobarbus is endemic to the Lukuga River in the Democratic Republic of the Congo.
