= Labeobarbus longidorsalis =

Scientific classification
- Kingdom: Animalia
- Phylum: Chordata
- Class: Actinopterygii
- Order: Cypriniformes
- Family: Cyprinidae
- Subfamily: Torinae
- Genus: Labeobarbus
- Species: L. longidorsalis

Binomial name
- Labeobarbus longidorsalis (Pellegrin, 1935)

Synonyms
- Varicorhinus longidorsalis

Species of fish

Labeobarbus longidorsalis is a species of ray-finned fish in the genus Labeobarbus which is endemic to the Luhoho River in the Democratic Republic of the Congo.
