= Labeobarbus microbarbis =

Conservation status
- Extinct (IUCN 3.1)

Scientific classification
- Kingdom: Animalia
- Phylum: Chordata
- Class: Actinopterygii
- Order: Cypriniformes
- Family: Cyprinidae
- Subfamily: Torinae
- Genus: Labeobarbus
- Species: †L. microbarbis

Binomial name
- †Labeobarbus microbarbis (L. R. David & Poll, 1937)

Synonyms
- Barbus microbarbis David & Poll, 1937

Extinct species of fish

Labeobarbus microbarbis is an extinct species of cyprinid fish. It was endemic to Lake Luhondo in Rwanda.

The fish has not been recorded since alien fish species of Tilapia and Haplochromis were introduced to the lake. Despite regular surveys L. micronarbis has not been seen for over fifty years and has thus been classed as extinct. However, it may be that the original holotype represents a hybrid rather than a valid species and so the taxonomic status of the species is doubtful.
