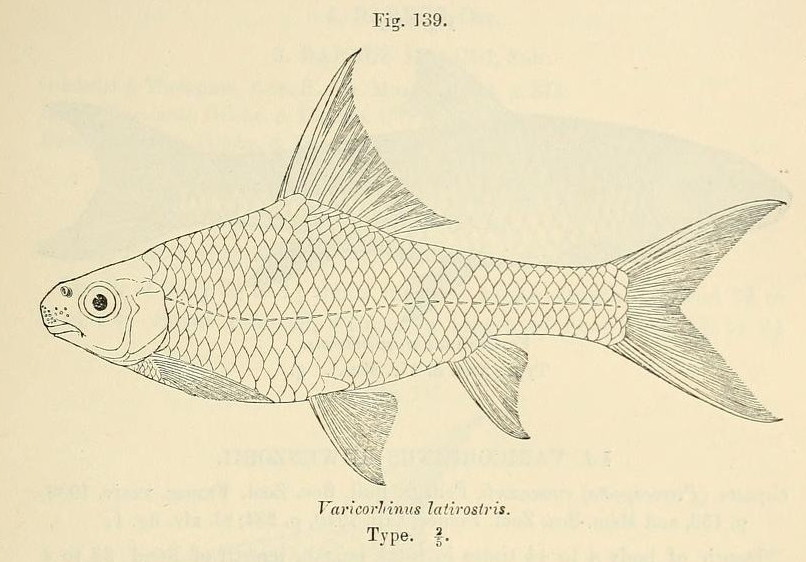

Scientific classification
- Kingdom: Animalia
- Phylum: Chordata
- Class: Actinopterygii
- Order: Cypriniformes
- Family: Cyprinidae
- Subfamily: Torinae
- Genus: Labeobarbus
- Species: L. boulengeri

Binomial name
- Labeobarbus boulengeri Vreven, Musschoot, Snoeks, & Schliewen, 2016

Synonyms
- Varicorhinus ansorgii

= Labeobarbus boulengeri =

Species of fish

Labeobarbus boulengeri is a species of ray-finned fish in the family Cyprinidae. It is found in the Luculla River system and the lower Congo River in Africa.
