= Labeobarbus huloti =

Conservation status
- Data Deficient (IUCN 3.1)

Scientific classification
- Kingdom: Animalia
- Phylum: Chordata
- Class: Actinopterygii
- Order: Cypriniformes
- Family: Cyprinidae
- Subfamily: Torinae
- Genus: Labeobarbus
- Species: L. huloti

Binomial name
- Labeobarbus huloti Banister, 1976

Synonyms
- Barbus huloti Banister, 1976

Species of fish

Labeobarbus huloti is a species of ray-finned fish in the family Cyprinidae. It is found in Democratic Republic of the Congo and Uganda. Its natural habitat is rivers.
