= Labeobarbus ruandae =

Conservation status
- Near Threatened (IUCN 3.1)

Scientific classification
- Kingdom: Animalia
- Phylum: Chordata
- Class: Actinopterygii
- Order: Cypriniformes
- Family: Cyprinidae
- Subfamily: Torinae
- Genus: Labeobarbus
- Species: L. ruandae

Binomial name
- Labeobarbus ruandae Pappenheim in Pappenheim & Boulenger, 1914

Synonyms
- Barbus ruandae (Pappenheim & Boulenger, 1914); Varicorhinus ruandae Pappenheim, 1914

Species of fish

Labeobarbus ruandae is a species of ray-finned fish in the family Cyprinidae. It is found only in Rwanda. Its natural habitat is rivers. It is threatened by habitat loss.
