= Labeobarbus girardi =

Conservation status
- Data Deficient (IUCN 3.1)

Scientific classification
- Domain: Eukaryota
- Kingdom: Animalia
- Phylum: Chordata
- Class: Actinopterygii
- Order: Cypriniformes
- Family: Cyprinidae
- Subfamily: Torinae
- Genus: Labeobarbus
- Species: L. girardi

Binomial name
- Labeobarbus girardi (Boulenger, 1910)

Synonyms
- Barbus girardi Boulnger, 1910

Species of fish

Labeobarbus girardi is a species of ray-finned fish in the genus Labeobarbus from the Lucala River in Angola.
