= Labeobarbus altipinnis =

Scientific classification
- Kingdom: Animalia
- Phylum: Chordata
- Class: Actinopterygii
- Order: Cypriniformes
- Family: Cyprinidae
- Subfamily: Torinae
- Genus: Labeobarbus
- Species: L. altipinnis

Binomial name
- Labeobarbus altipinnis (Banister & Poll, 1973)

Synonyms
- Varicorhinus altipinnis

Species of fish

Labeobarbus altipinnis is a species of ray-finned fish in the family Cyprinidae. It is endemic to the Lufira River system in central Africa.
