= Labeobarbus robertsi =

Scientific classification
- Kingdom: Animalia
- Phylum: Chordata
- Class: Actinopterygii
- Order: Cypriniformes
- Family: Cyprinidae
- Subfamily: Torinae
- Genus: Labeobarbus
- Species: L. robertsi

Binomial name
- Labeobarbus robertsi (Banister, 1984)

Synonyms
- Varicorhinus robertsi

Species of fish

Labeobarbus robertsi is a species of ray-finned fish in the genus Labeobarbus is endemic to the Inkisi River in the Democratic Republic of the Congo.
