= Labeobarbus rocadasi =

Conservation status
- Data Deficient (IUCN 3.1)

Scientific classification
- Domain: Eukaryota
- Kingdom: Animalia
- Phylum: Chordata
- Class: Actinopterygii
- Order: Cypriniformes
- Family: Cyprinidae
- Subfamily: Torinae
- Genus: Labeobarbus
- Species: L. rocadasi

Binomial name
- Labeobarbus rocadasi (Boulenger, 1910)

Synonyms
- Barbus rocadasi Boulenger, 1910

Species of fish

Labeobarbus rocadasi is a species of cyprinid fish that occurs in the Nyong River in Cameroon and in the Quanza and Lucala rivers in Angola.
