= Labeobarbus wittei =

Scientific classification
- Kingdom: Animalia
- Phylum: Chordata
- Class: Actinopterygii
- Order: Cypriniformes
- Family: Cyprinidae
- Subfamily: Torinae
- Genus: Labeobarbus
- Species: L. wittei

Binomial name
- Labeobarbus wittei (Banister & Poll, 1973)

Synonyms
- Varicorhinus wittei

Species of fish

Labeobarbus wittei is a species of ray-finned fish in the genus Labeobarbus endemic to the Lufira River in the Democratic Republic of the Congo.
