= Smallscale yellowfish =

Conservation status
- Least Concern (IUCN 3.1)

Scientific classification
- Domain: Eukaryota
- Kingdom: Animalia
- Phylum: Chordata
- Class: Actinopterygii
- Order: Cypriniformes
- Family: Cyprinidae
- Subfamily: Torinae
- Genus: Labeobarbus
- Species: L. polylepis

Binomial name
- Labeobarbus polylepis (Boulenger, 1907)

Synonyms
- Barbus polylepis Boulenger, 1907; Barbus elephantis Boulenger, 1907; Barbus lineolatus Gilchrist & Thompson, 1913

Species of fish

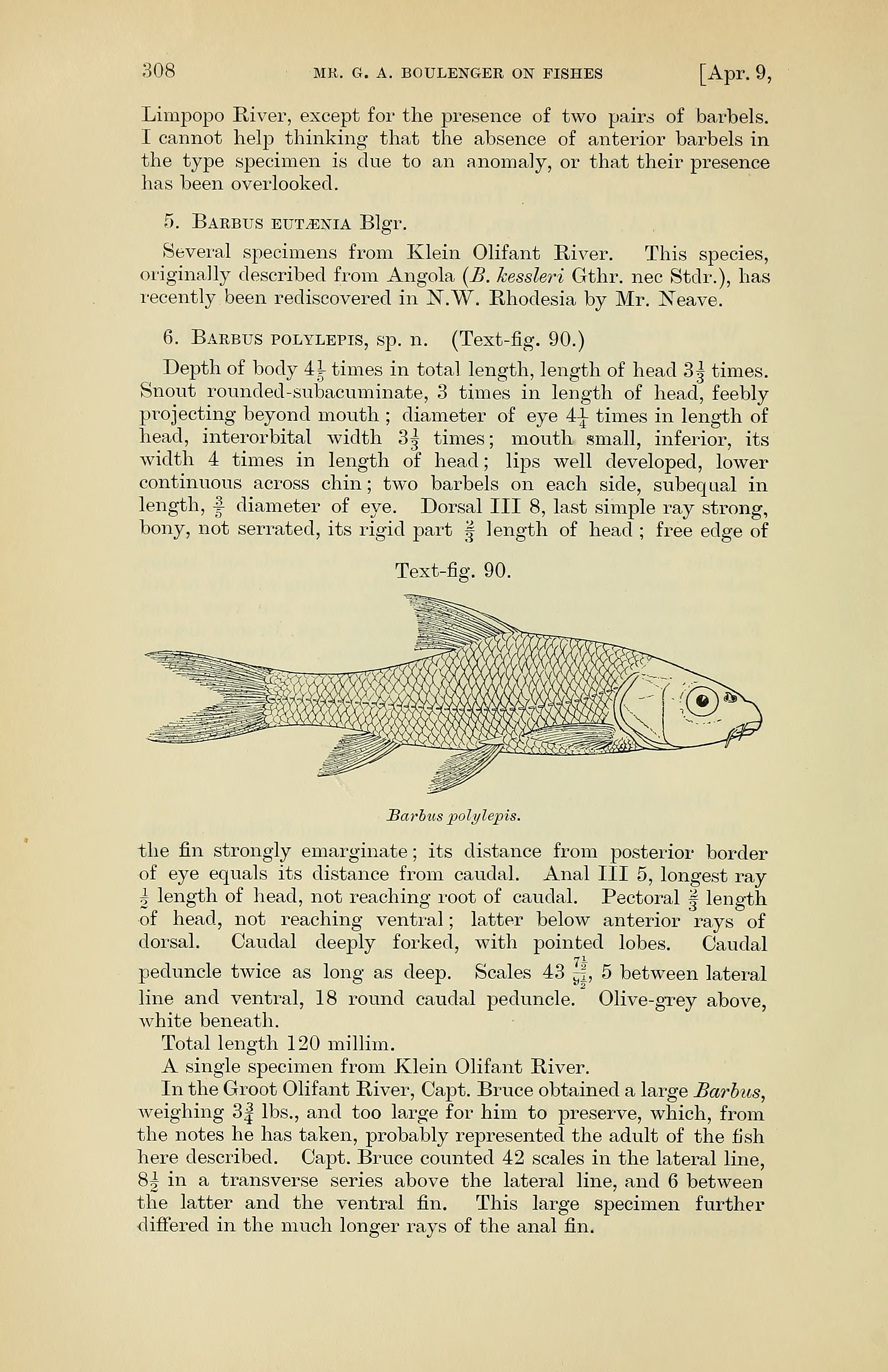

The smallscale yellowfish (Labeobarbus polylepis) is a South African species of freshwater fish in the cyprinid family. It is native to the Limpopo, Incomati and Pongolo drainages.
