= Labeobarbus trachypterus =

Conservation status
- Least Concern (IUCN 3.1)

Scientific classification
- Domain: Eukaryota
- Kingdom: Animalia
- Phylum: Chordata
- Class: Actinopterygii
- Order: Cypriniformes
- Family: Cyprinidae
- Subfamily: Torinae
- Genus: Labeobarbus
- Species: L. trachypterus

Binomial name
- Labeobarbus trachypterus (Boulenger, 1915)

Synonyms
- Barbus trachypterus Boulenger, 1915

Species of fish

Labeobarbus trachypterus is a species of ray-finned fish in the genus Labeobarbus from the upper Lualaba, Lake Mweru and lower Luapula in the Democratic Republic of the Congo and Zambia.
