= Labeobarbus mungoensis =

Conservation status
- Endangered (IUCN 3.1)

Scientific classification
- Domain: Eukaryota
- Kingdom: Animalia
- Phylum: Chordata
- Class: Actinopterygii
- Order: Cypriniformes
- Family: Cyprinidae
- Subfamily: Torinae
- Genus: Labeobarbus
- Species: L. mungoensis

Binomial name
- Labeobarbus mungoensis (Trewavas, 1974)

Synonyms
- Barbus mungoensis Trewavas, 1974

Species of fish

Labeobarbus mungoensis is a species of cyprinid fish endemic to Cameroon in Africa. It is found in the Blackwater, Menge, Mungo and Sanaga river basins.
