= Labeobarbus nanningsi =

Conservation status
- Data Deficient (IUCN 3.1)

Scientific classification
- Kingdom: Animalia
- Phylum: Chordata
- Class: Actinopterygii
- Order: Cypriniformes
- Family: Cyprinidae
- Subfamily: Torinae
- Genus: Labeobarbus
- Species: L. nanningsi

Binomial name
- Labeobarbus nanningsi (de Beaufort, 1933)

Synonyms
- Barbus nanningsi (de Beaufort, 1933)

Species of fish

Labeobarbus nanningsi is a species of cyprinid fish in the genus Labeobarbus from Angola.
