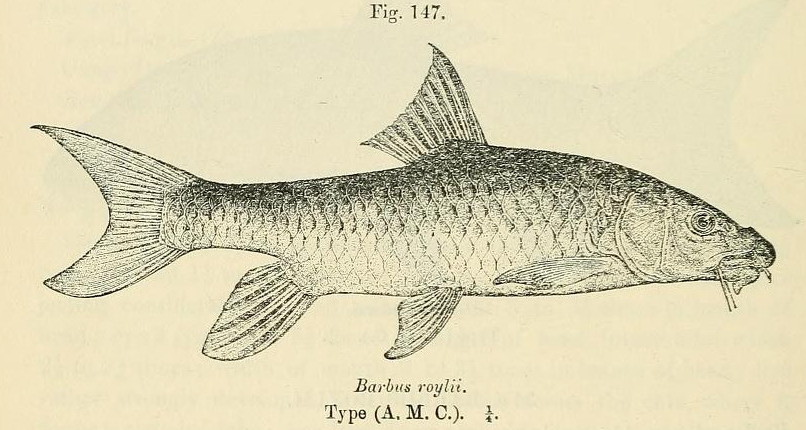

Conservation status
- Endangered (IUCN 3.1)

Scientific classification
- Domain: Eukaryota
- Kingdom: Animalia
- Phylum: Chordata
- Class: Actinopterygii
- Order: Cypriniformes
- Family: Cyprinidae
- Subfamily: Torinae
- Genus: Labeobarbus
- Species: L. roylii

Binomial name
- Labeobarbus roylii (Boulenger, 1912)

Synonyms
- Barbus roylii Boulenger, 1912

= Labeobarbus roylii =

Species of fish

Labeobarbus roylii is a species of cyprinid fish found in the Chiloango and the Kouilou river basins in Angola and the Republic of Congo.
