= Labeobarbus malacanthus =

Conservation status
- Least Concern (IUCN 3.1)

Scientific classification
- Domain: Eukaryota
- Kingdom: Animalia
- Phylum: Chordata
- Class: Actinopterygii
- Order: Cypriniformes
- Family: Cyprinidae
- Subfamily: Torinae
- Genus: Labeobarbus
- Species: L. malacanthus

Binomial name
- Labeobarbus malacanthus (Pappenheim, 1911)

Synonyms
- Barbus malacanthus Pappenheim, 1911

Species of fish

Labeobarbus malacanthus is a species of cyprinid fish found in Gabon and Equatorial Guinea.
