= Labeobarbus lobogenysoides =

Scientific classification
- Domain: Eukaryota
- Kingdom: Animalia
- Phylum: Chordata
- Class: Actinopterygii
- Order: Cypriniformes
- Family: Cyprinidae
- Subfamily: Torinae
- Genus: Labeobarbus
- Species: L. lobogenysoides

Binomial name
- Labeobarbus lobogenysoides Pellegrin, 1935

Synonyms
- Barbus paucisquamatus; Barbus altianalis paucisquamata; Labeobarbus paucisquamatus

Species of fish

Labeobarbus lobogenysoides is a species of ray-finned fish in the genus Labeobarbus is endemic to the Loama River in the Democratic Republic of the Congo.
