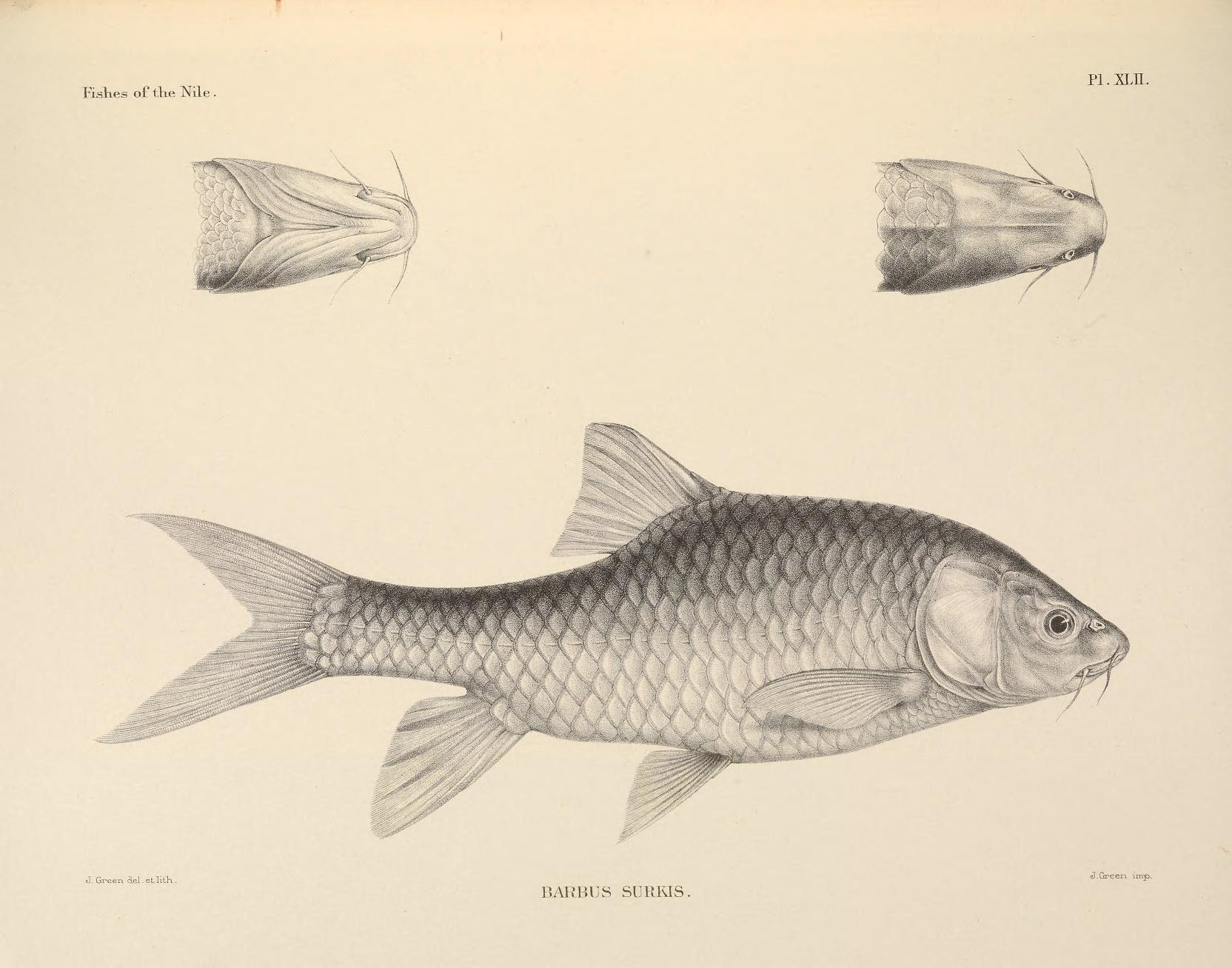

Conservation status
- Data Deficient (IUCN 3.1)

Scientific classification
- Domain: Eukaryota
- Kingdom: Animalia
- Phylum: Chordata
- Class: Actinopterygii
- Order: Cypriniformes
- Family: Cyprinidae
- Subfamily: Torinae
- Genus: Labeobarbus
- Species: L. surkis

Binomial name
- Labeobarbus surkis (Rüppell, 1835)

Synonyms
- Barbus surkis Rüppell, 1835

= Labeobarbus surkis =

Species of fish

Labeobarbus surkis is a species of cyprinid fish that is endemic to Lake Tana and associated rivers in Ethiopia.
