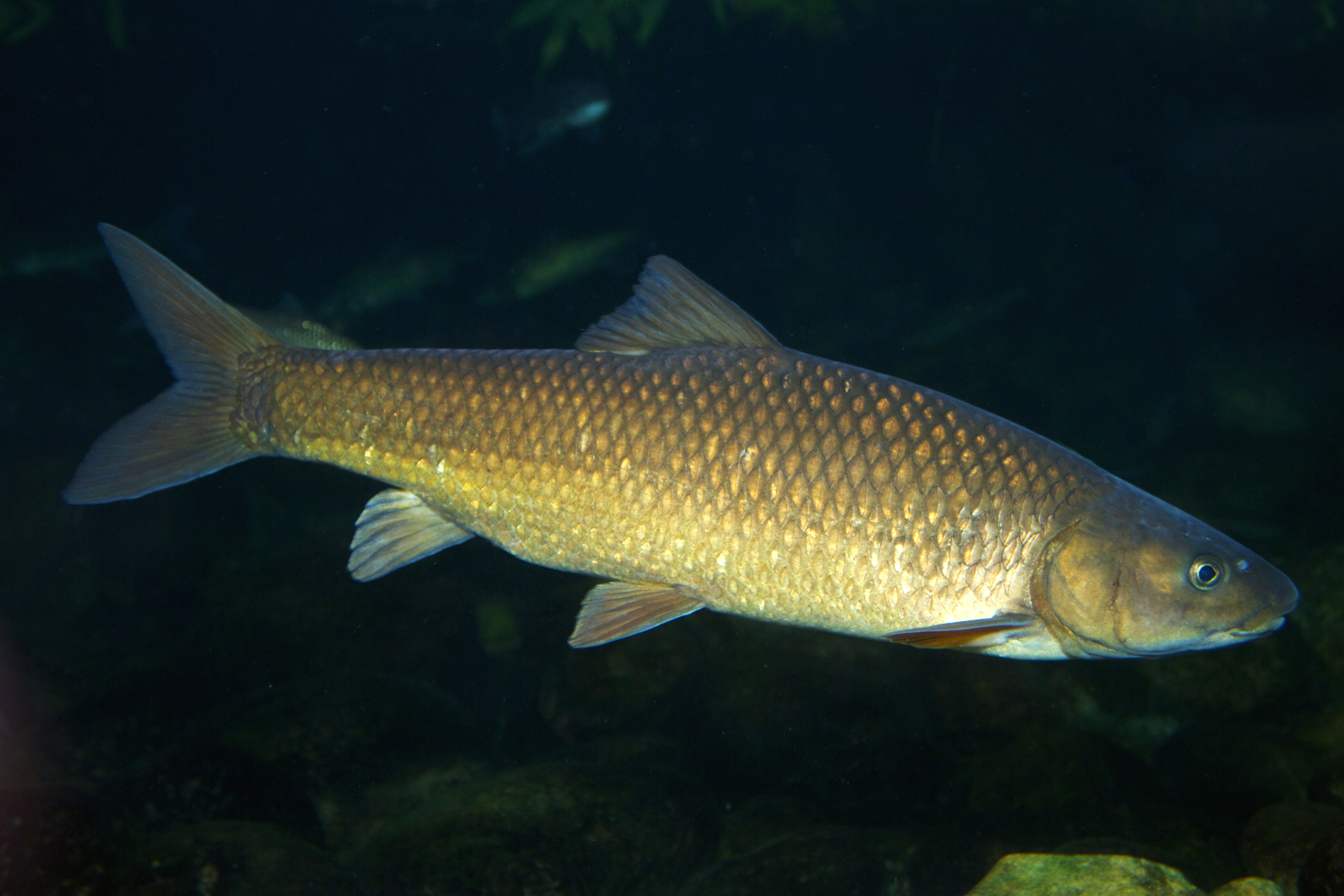
- Clanwilliam yellowfish (Labeobarbus seeberi)

Scientific classification
- Kingdom: Animalia
- Phylum: Chordata
- Class: Actinopterygii
- Order: Cypriniformes
- Family: Cyprinidae
- Subfamily: Torinae
- Genus: Labeobarbus; Rüppell, 1835

Type species
- Labeobarbus nedgia Rüppell, 1835

Diversity
- See text

Synonyms
- Barbellion Whitley, 1931; Barynotus Günther, 1868; Dillonia Heckel, 1871; Lanceabarbus Fowler, 1936; Varicorhinus Rüppell, 1835

= Labeobarbus =

Genus of fishes

Labeobarbus is a mid-sized ray-finned fish genus in the family Cyprinidae. Its species are widely distributed throughout eastern Africa and especially southern Africa, but also in Lake Tana in Ethiopia. A common name, in particular for the southern species, is yellowfish. The scientific name refers to the fact that these large barbs recall the fairly closely related "carps" in the genus Labeo in size and shape. As far as can be told, all Labeobarbus species are hexaploid. One species, L. microbarbis from Rwanda, is known to have gone extinct in recent times.

== Systematics ==
Like many other "barbs", it was long included in Barbus. It appears to be a fairly close relative of the typical barbels and relatives – the genus Barbus proper – but closer still to the large Near Eastern species nowadays separated in Carasobarbus. Barbus has been split to account for the improved phylogenetic knowledge which indicated it was highly paraphyletic in its wide circumscription; it may be that Carasobarbus and some other closely related "barbs" (e.g. Labeobarbus reinii) are now included in Labeobarbus to avoid a profusion of very small genera.

The taxonomy of many species in the "wastebin genus" Barbus has recently been re-evaluated. Though hybrid introgression may confound studies based in mtDNA data alone, a number of these species appear to be so closely related to Labeobarbus as to warrant inclusion in the present genus outright, irrespective of whether Carasobarbus is considered distinct or not. These include L. ethiopicus.

== Species ==
Labeobarbus at present contains the following species:

- Labeobarbus acuticeps (Matthes, 1959)
- Labeobarbus acutirostris (Bini, 1940)
- Labeobarbus aeneus (Burchell, 1822) (Smallmouth yellowfish)
- Labeobarbus altianalis (Boulenger, 1900) (Ripon barbel)
- Labeobarbus altipinnis (Banister & Poll, 1973)
- Labeobarbus ansorgii (Boulenger, 1906)
- Labeobarbus aspius (Boulenger, 1912)
- Labeobarbus axelrodi (Getahun, Stiassny & Teugels, 2004)
- Labeobarbus batesii (Boulenger, 1903)
- Labeobarbus beso (Rüppell, 1835) (African scraping feeder)
- Labeobarbus boulengeri Vreven, Musschoot, Snoeks & Schliewen, 2016
- Labeobarbus brauni (Pellegrin, 1935)
- Labeobarbus brevicephalus (Nagelkerke & Sibbing, 1997)
- Labeobarbus brevispinis (Holly, 1927)
- Labeobarbus bynni (Fabricius, 1775)
- Labeobarbus cardozoi (Boulenger, 1912)
- Labeobarbus caudovittatus (Boulenger, 1902)
- Labeobarbus clarkeae (Banister, 1984)
- Labeobarbus claudinae (De Vos & Thys van den Audenaerde, 1990)
- Labeobarbus codringtonii (Boulenger, 1908) (Upper Zambezi yellowfish)
- Labeobarbus compiniei (Sauvage,1879)
- Labeobarbus crassibarbis (Nagelkerke & Sibbing, 1997)
- Labeobarbus dainellii (Bini, 1940)
- Labeobarbus dartevellei (Poll, 1945)
- Labeobarbus dimidiatus (Tweddle & P. H. Skelton, 1998)
- Labeobarbus ensifer (Boulenger, 1910)
- Labeobarbus ensis (Boulenger, 1910)
- Labeobarbus ethiopicus (Zolezzi, 1939)
- Labeobarbus fimbriatus (Holly, 1926)
- Labeobarbus gananensis (Vinciguerra, 1895)
- Labeobarbus gestetneri (Banister & R. G. Bailey, 1979)
- Labeobarbus girardi (Boulenger, 1910)
- Labeobarbus gorgorensis (Bini, 1940)
- Labeobarbus gorguari (Rüppell, 1835)
- Labeobarbus gruveli (Pellegrin, 1911)
- Labeobarbus gulielmi (Boulenger, 1910)
- Labeobarbus habereri (Steindachner, 1912)
- Labeobarbus huloti (Banister, 1976)
- Labeobarbus humphri (Banister, 1976)
- Labeobarbus intermedius (Rüppell, 1835)
- Labeobarbus iphthimostoma (Banister & Poll, 1973)
- Labeobarbus iturii (Holly, 1929)
- Labeobarbus jaegeri (Holly, 1930)
- Labeobarbus johnstonii (Boulenger, 1907)
- Labeobarbus jubae (Banister, 1984)
- Labeobarbus jubbi (Poll, 1967)
- Labeobarbus kimberleyensis (Gilchrist & W. W. Thompson, 1913) (Largemouth yellowfish)
- Labeobarbus lagensis (Günther, 1868)
- Labeobarbus latirostris (Keilhack, 1908)
- Labeobarbus leleupanus (Matthes, 1959)
- Labeobarbus lobogenysoides (Pellegrin, 1935)
- Labeobarbus longidorsalis (Pellegrin, 1935)
- Labeobarbus longifilis (Pellegrin, 1935)
- Labeobarbus longissimus (Nagelkerke & Sibbing, 1997)
- Labeobarbus lucius (Boulenger, 1910)
- Labeobarbus lufupensis (Banister & Bailey, 1979)
- Labeobarbus macroceps (Fowler 1936)
- Labeobarbus macrolepidotus (Pellegrin, 1928)
- Labeobarbus macrolepis (Pfeffer, 1889)
- Labeobarbus macrophtalmus (Bini, 1940)
- Labeobarbus malacanthus (Pappenheim, 1911)
- Labeobarbus marequensis (A. Smith 1841) (Largescale yellowfish)
- Labeobarbus mariae (Holly, 1926)
- Labeobarbus matris (Holly, 1928).
- Labeobarbus mawambiensis (Steindachner, 1911)
- Labeobarbus mbami (Holly, 1927)
- Labeobarbus megastoma (Nagelkerke & Sibbing, 1997)
- Labeobarbus micronema (Boulenger, 1904)
- Labeobarbus mirabilis (Pappenheim, 1914)
- Labeobarbus mungoensis (Trewavas, 1974)
- Labeobarbus nanningsi de Beaufort, 1933
- Labeobarbus natalensis (Castelnau, 1861) (Scaly yellowfish)
- Labeobarbus nedgia Rüppell, 1835
- Labeobarbus nelspruitensis (Gilchrist & W. W. Thompson, 1911) (Incomati chiselmouth)
- Labeobarbus nthuwa Tweddle & Skelton, 2008
- Labeobarbus nzadimalawu Vreven, Musschoot, Decru, Lunkayilakio, Obiero, Cerwenka & Schliewen, 2018.
- Labeobarbus nzadinkisi Vreven, Musschoot, Decru, Lunkayilakio, Obiero, Cerwenka & Schliewen, 2018.
- Labeobarbus osseensis (Nagelkerke & Sibbing, 2000)
- Labeobarbus oxyrhynchus (Pfeffer, 1889) (Pangani barb)
- Labeobarbus pagenstecheri (J. G. Fischer, 1884)
- Labeobarbus parawaldroni (Lévêque, Thys van den Audenaerde & Traoré, 1987)
- Labeobarbus pellegrini (Bertin & Estève, 1948)
- Labeobarbus petitjeani (Daget, 1962)
- Labeobarbus platydorsus (Nagelkerke & Sibbing, 1997)
- Labeobarbus platyrhinus (Boulenger, 1900)
- Labeobarbus platystomus (Pappenheim, 1914) (Rwandese carp)
- Labeobarbus pojeri (Poll, 1944)
- Labeobarbus polylepis (Boulenger, 1907) (Smallscale yellowfish)
- Labeobarbus progenys (Boulenger, 1903)
- Labeobarbus pungweensis (Jubb, 1959) (Pungwe chiselmouth)
- Labeobarbus rhinoceros (Copley, 1938) (Rhinofish)
- Labeobarbus rhinophorus (Boulenger, 1910)
- Labeobarbus robertsi (Banister, 1984)
- Labeobarbus rocadasi (Boulenger, 1910)
- Labeobarbus rosae (Boulenger, 1910).
- Labeobarbus roylii (Boulenger, 1912)
- Labeobarbus ruandae (Pappenheim, 1914)
- Labeobarbus ruasae (Pappenheim, 1914)
- Labeobarbus ruwenzorii (Pellegrin, 1909)
- Labeobarbus sacratus (Daget, 1963)
- Labeobarbus sandersi (Boulenger, 1912)
- Labeobarbus seeberi (Gilchrist & W. W. Thompson, 1913) (Clanwilliam yellowfish)
- Labeobarbus semireticulatus (Pellegrin, 1924)
- Labeobarbus somereni (Boulenger, 1911)
- Labeobarbus stappersii (Boulenger, 1915)
- Labeobarbus steindachneri (Boulenger, 1910)
- Labeobarbus stenostoma (Boulenger, 1910)
- Labeobarbus surkis (Rüppell, 1835)
- Labeobarbus tornieri (Steindachner, 1906)
- Labeobarbus trachypterus (Boulenger, 1915)
- Labeobarbus tropidolepis (Boulenger, 1900)
- Labeobarbus truttiformis (Nagelkerke & Sibbing, 1997)
- Labeobarbus tsanensis (Nagelkerke & Sibbing, 1997))
- Labeobarbus upembensis (Banister & Bailey, 1979)
- Labeobarbus urotaenia (Boulenger, 1913)
- Labeobarbus varicostoma (Boulenger, 1910)
- Labeobarbus versluysii (Holly, 1929)
- Labeobarbus werneri (Holly, 1929)
- Labeobarbus wittei (Banister & Poll, 1973)
- Labeobarbus wurtzi (Pellegrin, 1908)
- Labeobarbus xyrocheilus (Tweddle & Skelton, 1998)
