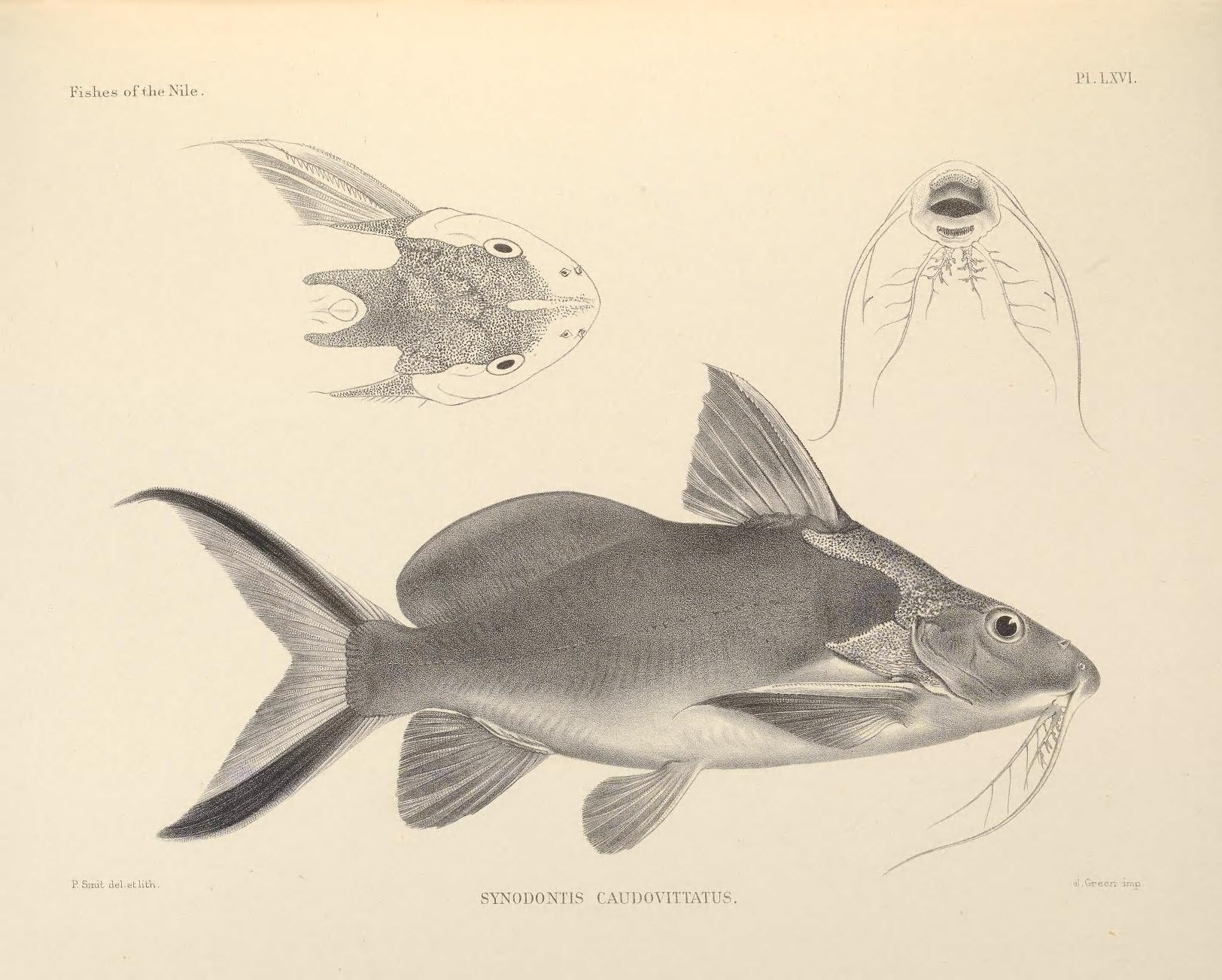

Conservation status
- Data Deficient (IUCN 3.1)

Scientific classification
- Kingdom: Animalia
- Phylum: Chordata
- Class: Actinopterygii
- Order: Siluriformes
- Family: Mochokidae
- Genus: Synodontis
- Species: S. caudovittatus

Binomial name
- Synodontis caudovittatus Boulenger, 1901

= Synodontis caudovittatus =

Species of fish

Synodontis caudovittatus, known as the white-finned synodontis, is a species of upside-down catfish that is native to the Nile basin of Ethiopia, South Sudan, and Sudan. It was first described by British-Belgian zoologist George Albert Boulenger in 1901, from specimens collected in the White Nile, at the mouth of Lake No in South Sudan. The species name caudovittatus comes from the Latin word cauda, meaning "tail", and the Latin word vitta, meaning "stripe" and refers to the coloration of the tailfin.

== Description ==
Like all members of the genus Synodontis, S. caudovittatus has a strong, bony head capsule that extends back as far as the first spine of the dorsal fin. The head contains a distinct narrow, bony, external protrusion called a humeral process. The shape and size of the humeral process helps to identify the species. In S. caudovittatus, the humeral process is flat, routh, a little longer than it is broad, and ends in a sharp point.

The fish has three pairs of barbels. The maxillary barbels are on located on the upper jaw, and two pairs of mandibular barbels are on the lower jaw. The maxillary barbel is long and straight without any branches, with or without a thin membrane at the base. It extends 1 1/5 to 1 1/2 the length of the head. The outer pair of mandibular barbels is about twice the length of the inner pair, and both pairs have long branches.

The front edges of the dorsal fins and the pectoral fins of Syntontis species are hardened into stiff spines. In S. caudovittatus, the spine of the dorsal fin is slightly curved, long, about as long or a little shorter than the head, smooth or finely serrated in the front and serrated on the back. The remaining portion of the dorsal fin is made up of seven branching rays. The spine of the pectoral fin about as long as the dorsal fin spine, and serrated on both sides. The adipose fin is 3 to 4 times as long as it is deep. The anal fin contains four unbranched and eight branched rays. The tail, or caudal fin, is deeply forked, with the upper lobe being longer.

All members of Syndontis have a structure called a premaxillary toothpad, which is located on the very front of the upper jaw of the mouth. This structure contains several rows of short, chisel-shaped teeth. In S. caudovittatus, the toothpad forms a short and broad band. On the lower jaw, or mandible, the teeth of Syndontis are attached to flexible, stalk-like structures and described as "s-shaped" or "hooked". The number of teeth on the mandible is used to differentiate between species; in S. caudovittatus, there are 33 to 38 teeth on the mandible.

The body color is grey, tinged with olive on the head and back. The fins are dark, except the spines and their filaments which are whitish. The caudal fin is greyish white, with a deep black band along each lobe. The barbels are white.

The maximum total length of the species is 22.5 centimetres (8.9 in). Generally, females in the genus Synodontis tend to be slightly larger than males of the same age.

== Habitat and behavior ==
In the wild, the species has been found in the White Nile river from Khartoum into the Baḥr al-Jabal River and Bahr el Ghazal River systems, and the Baro River in Ethiopia. The reproductive habits of most of the species of Synodontis are not known, beyond some instances of obtaining egg counts from gravid females. Spawning likely occurs during the flooding season between July and October, and pairs swim in unison during spawning. The fish feeds on algae, macrophytes, detritus, crustaceans, insects and mollusks. The growth rate is rapid in the first year, then slows down as the fish age.
