= Labeobarbus brevicephalus =

Scientific classification
- Kingdom: Animalia
- Phylum: Chordata
- Class: Actinopterygii
- Order: Cypriniformes
- Family: Cyprinidae
- Genus: Labeobarbus
- Species: L. brevicephalus

Binomial name
- Labeobarbus brevicephalus (Nagelkerke & Sibbing, 1997)

Synonyms
- Barbus brevicephalus Nagelkerke & Sibbing, 1997

Species of fish

Labeobarbus brevicephalus is a species of ray-finned fish in the genus Labeobarbus which is endemic to Lake Tana in Ethiopia.

The L. brevicephalus is one of 17 endemic migratory African barb species that makes a species flock in Lake Tana in Ethiopia. These small-sized, zooplanktinvorous, early maturing species perform breeding activities in the tributaries of the lake during the rainy season of the year. They tend to breed at the river mouth, downstream of the smaller tributaries near gravel deposits, in Lake Tana.
