= Labeobarbus gananensis =

Conservation status
- Data Deficient (IUCN 3.1)

Scientific classification
- Domain: Eukaryota
- Kingdom: Animalia
- Phylum: Chordata
- Class: Actinopterygii
- Order: Cypriniformes
- Family: Cyprinidae
- Subfamily: Torinae
- Genus: Labeobarbus
- Species: L. gananensis

Binomial name
- Labeobarbus gananensis Vinciguerra, 1895

Synonyms
- Barbus gananensis

Species of fish

Labeobarbus gananensis is a species of ray-finned fish in the genus Labeobarbus which is endemic to Ethiopia.
