= Labeobarbus osseensis =

Conservation status
- Vulnerable (IUCN 3.1)

Scientific classification
- Domain: Eukaryota
- Kingdom: Animalia
- Phylum: Chordata
- Class: Actinopterygii
- Order: Cypriniformes
- Family: Cyprinidae
- Subfamily: Torinae
- Genus: Labeobarbus
- Species: L. osseensis

Binomial name
- Labeobarbus osseensis Nagelkerke & Sibbing, 2000

Synonyms
- Barbus osseensis Nagelkerke & Sibbing, 2000

Species of fish

Labeobarbus osseensis is a species of cyprinid fish which is endemic to Lake Tana in Ethiopia.
