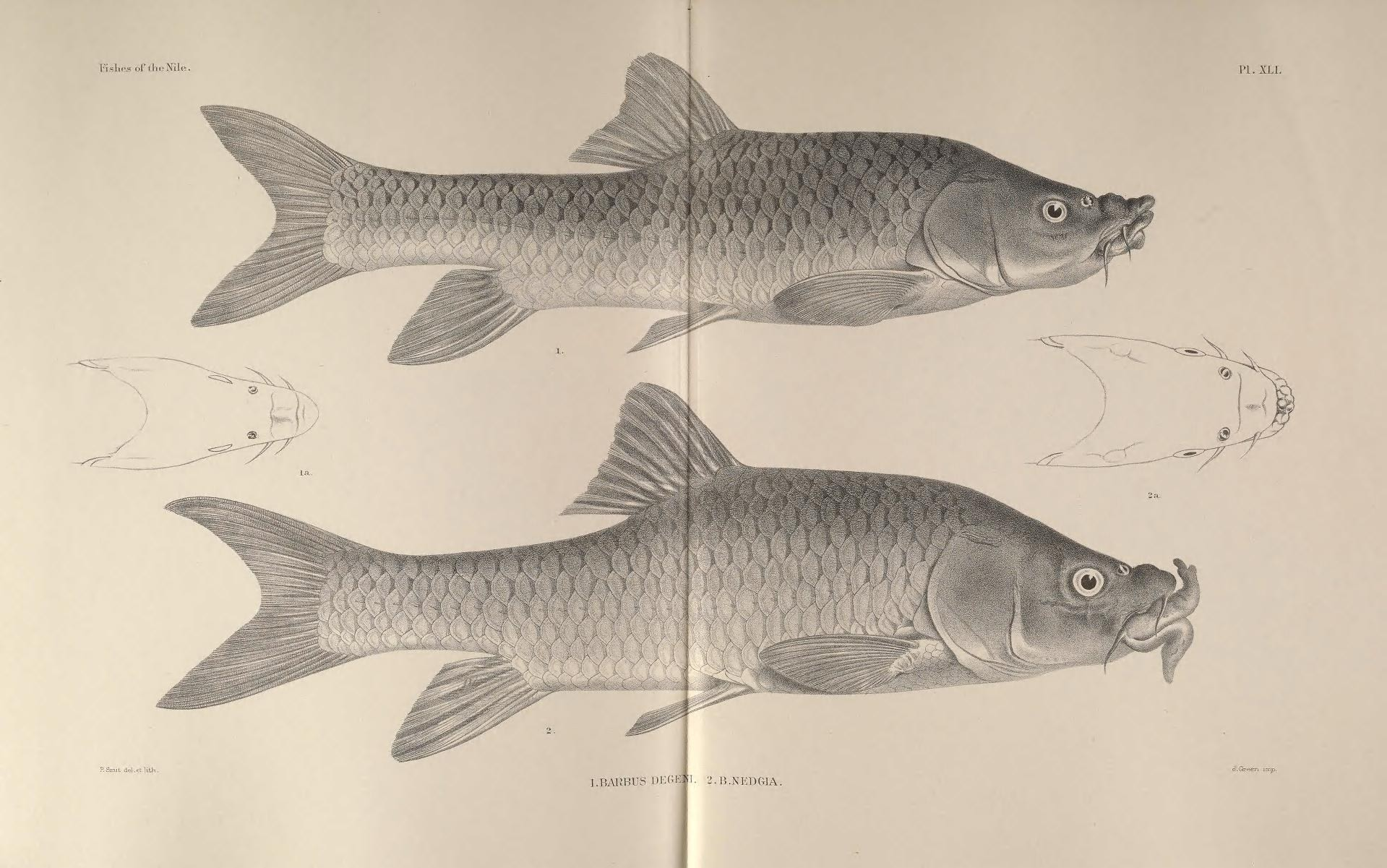

Conservation status
- Least Concern (IUCN 3.1)

Scientific classification
- Domain: Eukaryota
- Kingdom: Animalia
- Phylum: Chordata
- Class: Actinopterygii
- Order: Cypriniformes
- Family: Cyprinidae
- Subfamily: Torinae
- Genus: Labeobarbus
- Species: L. nedgia

Binomial name
- Labeobarbus nedgia Rüppell, 1835

Synonyms
- Barbus nedgia (Rüppell, 1835); Tor nedgia (Rüppell, 1835); Barbus degeni Boulenger, 1902

= Labeobarbus nedgia =

Species of fish

Labeobarbus nedgia is a species of ray-finned fish in the genus Labeobarbus which is endemic to Lake Tana and its tributaries in Ethiopia.
