= Labeobarbus macrophtalmus =

Conservation status
- Endangered (IUCN 3.1)

Scientific classification
- Domain: Eukaryota
- Kingdom: Animalia
- Phylum: Chordata
- Class: Actinopterygii
- Order: Cypriniformes
- Family: Cyprinidae
- Subfamily: Torinae
- Genus: Labeobarbus
- Species: L. macrophtalmus

Binomial name
- Labeobarbus macrophtalmus (Bini, 1940)

Synonyms
- Barbus macrophtalmus Bini, 1940

Species of fish

Labeobarbus macrophtalmus is a species of ray-finned fish in the genus Labeobarbus which is endemic to Lake Tana in Ethiopia where it is one of the rarer species of fish. It is threatened by overfishing, pollution, sedimentation and the introduction of invasive fish species.
