= Labeobarbus longifilis =

Conservation status
- Data Deficient (IUCN 3.1)

Scientific classification
- Kingdom: Animalia
- Phylum: Chordata
- Class: Actinopterygii
- Order: Cypriniformes
- Family: Cyprinidae
- Subfamily: Torinae
- Genus: Labeobarbus
- Species: L. longifilis

Binomial name
- Labeobarbus longifilis (Pellegrin, 1935)

Synonyms
- Barbus longifilis Pellegron, 1935

Species of fish

Labeobarbus longifilis is a species of ray-finned fish in the genus Labeobarbus from the upper Congo Basin in The Democratic Republic of the Congo.
