= Labeobarbus tsanensis =

Conservation status
- Least Concern (IUCN 3.1)

Scientific classification
- Domain: Eukaryota
- Kingdom: Animalia
- Phylum: Chordata
- Class: Actinopterygii
- Order: Cypriniformes
- Family: Cyprinidae
- Subfamily: Torinae
- Genus: Labeobarbus
- Species: L. tsanensis

Binomial name
- Labeobarbus tsanensis (Nagelkerke & Sibbing, 1997)

Synonyms
- Barbus tsanensis Nagelkerke & Sibbing, 1997

Species of fish

Labeobarbus tsanensis is a species of ray-finned fish in the genus Labeobarbus which is endemic to Lake Tana in Ethiopia.
