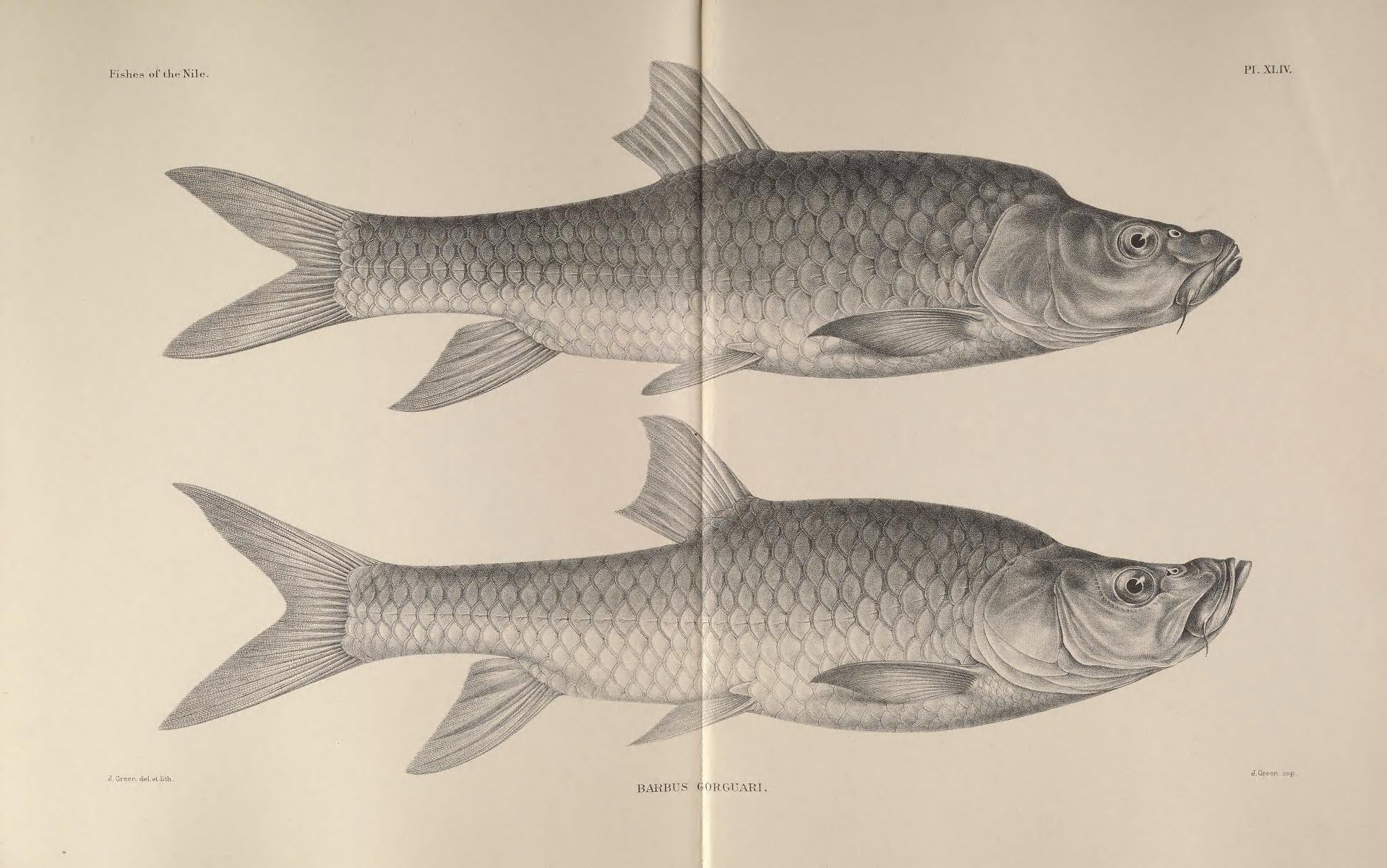

Conservation status
- Vulnerable (IUCN 3.1)

Scientific classification
- Domain: Eukaryota
- Kingdom: Animalia
- Phylum: Chordata
- Class: Actinopterygii
- Order: Cypriniformes
- Family: Cyprinidae
- Subfamily: Torinae
- Genus: Labeobarbus
- Species: L. gorguari

Binomial name
- Labeobarbus gorguari (Rüppell, 1835)

Synonyms
- Barbus gorguari Rüppell, 1835; Luciobarbus gorguari (Rüppell, 1835)

= Labeobarbus gorguari =

Species of fish

Labeobarbus gorguari is a threatened species of cyprinid fish. It is restricted to Lake Tana in Ethiopia.
