= Labeobarbus gorgorensis =

Conservation status
- Data Deficient (IUCN 3.1)

Scientific classification
- Domain: Eukaryota
- Kingdom: Animalia
- Phylum: Chordata
- Class: Actinopterygii
- Order: Cypriniformes
- Family: Cyprinidae
- Subfamily: Torinae
- Genus: Labeobarbus
- Species: L. gorgorensis

Binomial name
- Labeobarbus gorgorensis (Bini, 1940)

Synonyms
- Barbus gorgorensis Bini, 1940

Species of fish

Labeobarbus gorgorensis is a species of ray-finned fish in the genus Labeobarbus, which is endemic to Lake Tana in Ethiopia.
