= Labeobarbus mariae =

Conservation status
- Least Concern (IUCN 3.1)

Scientific classification
- Kingdom: Animalia
- Phylum: Chordata
- Class: Actinopterygii
- Order: Cypriniformes
- Family: Cyprinidae
- Subfamily: Torinae
- Genus: Labeobarbus
- Species: L. mariae

Binomial name
- Labeobarbus mariae (Holly, 1926)

Synonyms
- Varicorhinus mariae Holly, 1926

Species of fish

Labeobarbus mariae is a species of cyprinid fish.

It is endemic to Lower Guinea, found in the Wouri and Sanaga River basins.
