= Labeobarbus ethiopicus =

Conservation status
- Endangered (IUCN 3.1)

Scientific classification
- Domain: Eukaryota
- Kingdom: Animalia
- Phylum: Chordata
- Class: Actinopterygii
- Order: Cypriniformes
- Family: Cyprinidae
- Subfamily: Torinae
- Genus: Labeobarbus
- Species: L. ethiopicus

Binomial name
- Labeobarbus ethiopicus (Zolezzi, 1939)

Synonyms
- Barbus ethiopicus Zozelli, 1939

Species of fish

Labeobarbus ethiopicus is a species of ray-finned fish, usually placed in the genus Labeobarbus. It is endemic to Lake Ziway, in Ethiopia.
