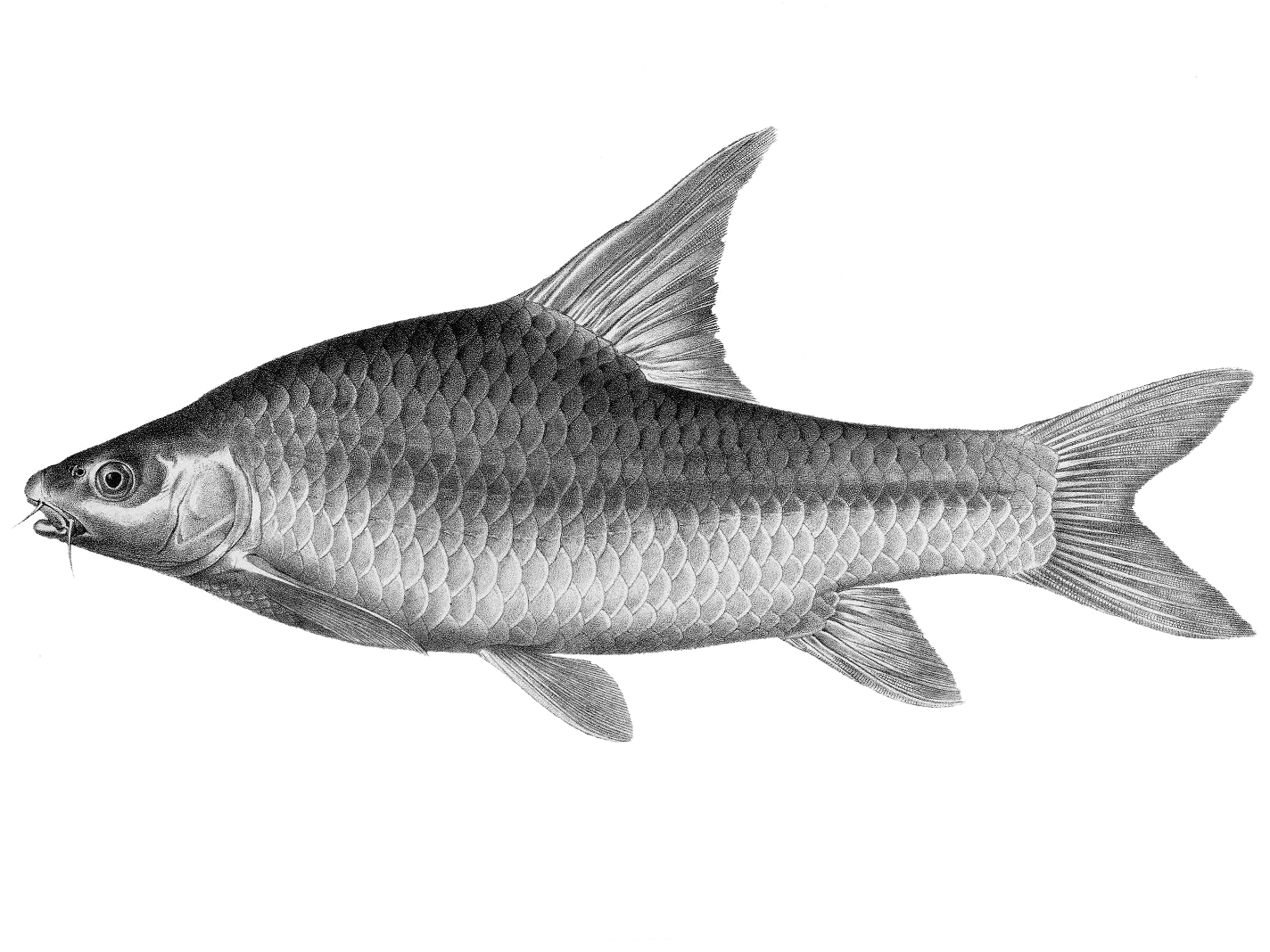

Conservation status
- Least Concern (IUCN 3.1)

Scientific classification
- Kingdom: Animalia
- Phylum: Chordata
- Class: Actinopterygii
- Division: Teleostei
- Order: Cypriniformes
- Family: Cyprinidae
- Subfamily: Torinae
- Genus: Labeobarbus
- Species: L. bynni

Binomial name
- Labeobarbus bynni (Forsskål, 1775)

Synonyms
- Cyprinus bynni Forsskål, 1775; Barbus bynni (Forsskål, 1775); Cyprinus lepidotus Geoffroy Saint-Hilaire, 1809; Barbus lepidotus (Geoffroy Saint-Hilaire, 1809); Barbus ruspolii Vinciguerra, 1897; Barbus meneliki Pellegrin, 1905; Barbus occidentalis Boulenger, 1911; Barbus foureaui Pellegrin, 1919; Barbus seguensis Pellegrin, 1925; Barbus rudolfianus Worthington, 1932; Barbus waldroni Norman, 1935; Barbus lancrenonensis Blache & Miton, 1960

= Labeobarbus bynni =

Species of fish

Labeobarbus bynni, the Niger barb, is an African species of cyprinid freshwater fish. It has often been placed in the genus Barbus, but is now usually placed in Labeobarbus. This is a relatively large barb, up to 82 cm (32 in) in total length. It is caught as a food fish, but catches can vary greatly from year to year.

== Distribution and habitat ==
Labeobarbus bynni is found in tropical West, Central and East Africa ranging from Gambia to Ethiopia. It occurs south as far as Kenya and Uganda, and north along the Nile to Egypt. It is found in freshwater habitats like lakes and rivers.

== Feeding ==
Labeobarbus bynni feeds on crustaceans (including ostracods), insects (including chironomid larvae), molluscs, small algae, and organic debris.

== Breeding ==
The breeding season extends from March to April.

== Subspecies ==
There are three subspecies:

- Labeobarbus bynni bynni (Forsskål, 1775): Much of the Nile river system, including Lake Turkana and Lake Albert.
- Labeobarbus bynni occidentalis Boulenger, 1911 – Niger Barb: This subspecies is found in the Chad, Niger, Senegal, Volta, Ouémé and Ogun river basins in Benin, Burkina Faso, Cameroon, Central African Republic, Chad, Ghana, Guinea, Mali, Niger, Nigeria, Senegal and Togo.
- Labeobarbus bynni waldroni Norman, 1935: Côte d'Ivoire and Ghana in the Sassandra, Bandama, Niouniourou, Comoe and Tano rivers.

== Common threats ==
Overall Labeobarbus bynni is widespread and faces no major threats, and consequently it has been evaluated as least concern by the IUCN. However, some local populations of L. bynni may be threatened by dams, water pollution, groundwater extraction, and drought.
