= Varicorhinus =

Genus of fishes

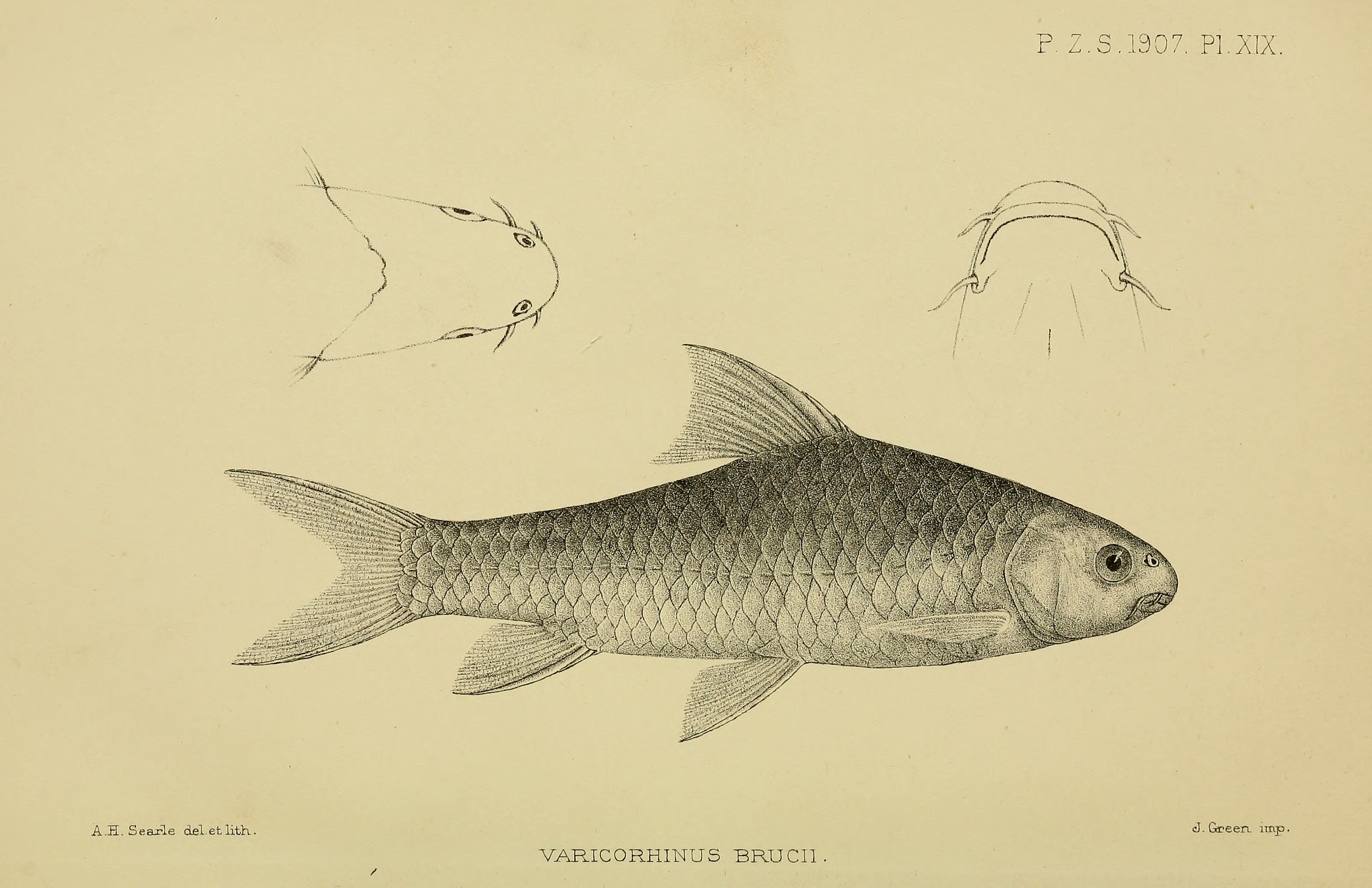
PZSL1907Plate19.

Varicorhinus is an invalid genus of ray-finned fishes in the family Cyprinidae. It was established by Eduard Rüppell in 1835 with V. beso as the type species. The prime distinguishing feature was designated as the shape of the mouth, and other species with a similar shape were soon added. However, this diagnostic did not prove to be monophyletic. In 2010, a synonymity of Varicorhinus and Labeobarbus was proposed based on mitochondrial cytochrome b gene. The synonymity was accepted by other researchers. The group of former Varicorhinus species inside Labeobarbus are called chiselmouths, while the remainder of Labeobarbus species are called rubberlips.

The members of this polyphyletic assemblage mainly belong to the group which is known as the subfamily Labeoninae to some authors and the tribe Labeonini of subfamily Cyprininae by others.

The taxa formerly placed in Varicorhinus are:

- Varicorhinus acanthopterus (Fowler, 1934) is now Scaphiodonichthys acanthopterus
- Varicorhinus alticorpus (Oshima, 1920) is now Onychostoma alticorpus
- Varicorhinus altipinnis Banister & Poll, 1973 is now Labeobarbus altipinnis
- Varicorhinus angorae Hankó, 1925 is now Capoeta damascina
- Varicorhinus angustistomatus Fang, 1940 is now Onychostoma angustistomatum
- Varicorhinus ansorgii Boulenger, 1906 is now Labeobarbus ansorgii
- Varicorhinus antalyensis Battalgil, 1943 is now Capoeta antalyensis
- Varicorhinus atlanticus (Boulenger, 1902) is now Carasobarbus fritschii
- Varicorhinus axelrodi Getahun, Stiassny & Teugels, 2004 is now Labeobarbus axelrodi
- Varicorhinus babaulti Pellegrin, 1932 is now Labeobarbus pellegrini
- Varicorhinus babeensis Nguyen & Nguyen, 2001 is now Onychostoma gerlachi
- Varicorhinus barbatulus (Pellegrin, 1908) is now Onychostoma barbatulum
- Varicorhinus barbatus (Lin, 1931) is now Onychostoma barbatum
- Varicorhinus bergi Derjavin, 1929 is now Capoeta aculeata
- Varicorhinus beso Rüppell, 1835 is now Labeobarbus beso
- Varicorhinus bingeri (Pellegrin, 1905) is now Labeobarbus intermedius
- Varicorhinus bobree Sykes, 1839 is now Labeo fimbriatus
- Varicorhinus brauni Pellegrin, 1935 is now Labeobarbus brauni
- Varicorhinus bredoi Poll, 1948 is now Labeobarbus trachypterus
- Varicorhinus brevis Lin, 1931 is now Decorus decorus
- Varicorhinus brucii Boulenger, 1907 is now Labeobarbus marequensis
- Varicorhinus capoeta (Güldenstädt, 1773) is now Capoeta capoeta
  - Varicorhinus capoeta angorae Hankó, 1925 is now Capoeta damascina
  - Varicorhinus capoeta capoeta (Güldenstädt, 1773) is now Capoeta capoeta
  - Varicorhinus capoeta sevangi (De Filippi, 1865) is now Capoeta sevangi
- Varicorhinus capoetoides Pellegrin, 1938 is now Capoeta capoetoides
- Varicorhinus chapini Nichols & La Monte, 1950 is now Labeobarbus tropidolepis
- Varicorhinus clarkeae Banister, 1984 is now Labeobarbus clarkeae
- Varicorhinus damascinus (Valenciennes, 1842) is now Capoeta damascina
- Varicorhinus dimidiatus Tweddle & Skelton, 1998 is now Labeobarbus dimidiatus
- Varicorhinus diplostomus Heckel, 1838 is now Bangana diplostoma
- Varicorhinus discognathoides Nichols & Pope, 1927 is now Altigena discognathoides
- Varicorhinus ensifer Boulenger, 1910 is now Labeobarbus ensifer
- Varicorhinus fimbriatus Holly, 1926 is now Labeobarbus fimbriatus
- Varicorhinus fratercula (Heckel, 1843) is now Capoeta damascina
- Varicorhinus gerachi (Peters, 1881) is now Onychostoma gerlachi
- Varicorhinus gerlachi (Peters, 1881) is now Onychostoma gerlachi
- Varicorhinus graffeuili Pellegrin & Chevey, 1936 is now Altigena tonkinensis
- Varicorhinus holmwoodii (Boulenger, 1896) is now Chondrostoma holmwoodii
- Varicorhinus iphthimostoma Banister & Poll, 1973 is now Labeobarbus iphthimostoma
- Varicorhinus jaegeri Holly, 1930 is now Labeobarbus jaegeri
- Varicorhinus jubae Banister, 1984 is now Labeobarbus jubae
- Varicorhinus kemali Hankó, 1925 is now Garra kemali
- Varicorhinus kreyenbergii (Regan, 1908) is now Acrossocheilus kreyenbergii
- Varicorhinus laticeps (Günther, 1896) is now Onychostoma laticeps
- Varicorhinus latirostris Boulenger, 1910 is now Labeobarbus boulengeri
- Varicorhinus leleupanus Matthes, 1959 is now Labeobarbus leleupanus
- Varicorhinus lemassoni Pellegrin & Chevey, 1936 is now Decorus lemassoni
- Varicorhinus lepturus (Boulenger, 1900) is now Onychostoma lepturus
- Varicorhinus lini Wu, 1939 is now Onychostoma lini
- Varicorhinus longidorsalis Pellegrin, 1935 is now Labeobarbus longidorsalis
- Varicorhinus lufupensis Banister & Bailey, 1979 is now Labeobarbus lufupensis
- Varicorhinus macracanthus (Pellegrin & Chevey, 1936) is now Scaphiodonichthys macracanthus
- Varicorhinus macrolepidotus Pellegrin, 1928 is now Labeobarbus macrolepidotus
- Varicorhinus mariae Holly, 1926 is now Labeobarbus mariae
- Varicorhinus maroccanus (Günther, 1902) is now Labeobarbus maroccanus
- Varicorhinus mutabilis (Lin, 1933) is now Rectoris mutabilis
- Varicorhinus nasutus Gilchrist & Thompson, 1911 is now Labeobarbus marequensis
- Varicorhinus nelspruitensis Gilchrist & Thompson, 1911 is now Labeobarbus nelspruitensis
- Varicorhinus nikolskii Derjavin, 1929 is now Capoeta buhsei
- Varicorhinus nyasensis Worthington, 1933 is now Labeobarbus johnstonii
- Varicorhinus ovalis (Pellegrin & Chevey, 1936) is now Onychostoma ovale
  - Varicorhinus ovalis rhomboides Tang, 1942 is now Onychostoma ovale
- Varicorhinus pellegrini Bertin & Estève, 1948 is now Labeobarbus pellegrini
- Varicorhinus pestai Pietschmann, 1933 is now Capoeta pestai
- Varicorhinus platystoma Pappenheim, 1914 is now Labeobarbus platystomus
- Varicorhinus platystomus Pappenheim, 1914 is now Labeobarbus platystomus
- Varicorhinus pogonifer Lin, 1931 is now Altigena discognathoides
- Varicorhinus posehensis (Lin, 1935) is now Rectoris posehensis
- Varicorhinus pungweensis Jubb, 1959 is now Labeobarbus pungweensis
- Varicorhinus rarus Lin, 1933 is now Onychostoma rarum
- Varicorhinus rhomboides Tang, 1942 is now Onychostoma ovale
- Varicorhinus robertsi Banister, 1984 is now Labeobarbus robertsi
- Varicorhinus robustus Nichols, 1925 is now Onychostoma barbatulum
- Varicorhinus ruandae Pappenheim, 1914 is now Labeobarbus ruandae
- Varicorhinus ruwenzori (Pellegrin, 1909) is now Labeobarbus ruwenzorii
- Varicorhinus ruwenzorii (Pellegrin, 1909) is now Labeobarbus ruwenzorii
- Varicorhinus sandersi Boulenger, 1912 is now Labeobarbus sandersi
  - Varicorhinus sandersi fimbriatus Holly, 1926 is now Labeobarbus fimbriatus
  - Varicorhinus sandersi sandersi Boulenger, 1912 is now Labeobarbus sandersi
- Varicorhinus sauvagei (Lortet, 1883) is now Garra nana
- Varicorhinus semireticulatus Pellegrin, 1924 is now Labeobarbus semireticulatus
- Varicorhinus sieboldi (Steindachner, 1864) is now Capoeta sieboldii
- Varicorhinus sieboldii (Steindachner, 1864) is now Capoeta sieboldii
- Varicorhinus simus (Sauvage & Dabry de Thiersant, 1874) is now Onychostoma simum
- Varicorhinus socialis (Heckel, 1843) is now Capoeta damascina
- Varicorhinus stappersii Boulenger, 1917 is now Labeobarbus caudovittatus
- Varicorhinus steindachneri Boulenger, 1910 is now Labeobarbus steindachneri
- Varicorhinus stenostoma Boulenger, 1910 is now Labeobarbus stenostoma
- Varicorhinus syriacus (Valenciennes, 1844) is now Capoeta damascina
- Varicorhinus szechwanensis Chang, 1944 is now Onychostoma angustistomatum
- Varicorhinus tamusuiensis Oshima, 1919 is now Onychostoma barbatulum
- Varicorhinus tanganicae (Boulenger, 1900) is now Acapoeta tanganicae
- Varicorhinus thacbaensis Nguyen & Ngo, 2001 is now Onychostoma gerlachi
- Varicorhinus tinca (Heckel, 1843) is now Capoeta tinca
- Varicorhinus tonkinensis Pellegrin & Chevey, 1934 is now Altigena tonkinensis
- Varicorhinus tornieri Steindachner, 1906 is now Labeobarbus tornieri
- Varicorhinus tungting Nichols, 1925 is now Decorus tungting
- Varicorhinus upembensis Banister & Bailey, 1979 is now Labeobarbus upembensis
- Varicorhinus varicostoma Boulenger, 1910 is now Labeobarbus varicostoma
- Varicorhinus velifera (Holly, 1926) is now Sanagia velifera
- Varicorhinus werneri Holly, 1929 is now Labeobarbus werneri
- Varicorhinus wittei Banister & Poll, 1973 is now Labeobarbus wittei
- Varicorhinus wurtzi (Pellegrin, 1908) is now Labeobarbus wurtzi
- Varicorhinus xyrocheilus Tweddle & Skelton, 1998 is now Labeobarbus xyrocheilus
- Varicorhinus yeni Nguyen & Ngo, 2001 is now Onychostoma gerlachi

== Sources ==
- Decru, Eva; Snoeks, Jos; Walanga, Albert; Vreven, Emmanuel J. W. M. N. (2022-11-24). "Disentangling the Diversity of the Labeobarbus Taxa (Cypriniformes: Cyprinidae) from the Epulu Basin (DR Congo, Africa)". Diversity. 14 (12): 1022. doi:10.3390/d14121022. ISSN 1424-2818.
- Tsigenopoulos, Costas S.; Kasapidis, Panagiotis; Berrebi, Patrick (2010). "Phylogenetic relationships of hexaploid large-sized barbs (genus Labeobarbus, Cyprinidae) based on mtDNA data". Molecular Phylogenetics and Evolution. 56 (2): 851–856. doi:10.1016/j.ympev.2010.02.006. ISSN 1055-7903.
