= Capoeta damascina =

Conservation status
- Least Concern (IUCN 3.1)

Scientific classification
- Kingdom: Animalia
- Phylum: Chordata
- Class: Actinopterygii
- Division: Teleostei
- Order: Cypriniformes
- Family: Cyprinidae
- Subfamily: Barbinae
- Genus: Capoeta
- Species: C. damascina

Binomial name
- Capoeta damascina (Valenciennes, 1842)

Synonyms
- Gobio damascinus Valenciennes, 1842; Scaphiodon fratercula Heckel, 1843; Scaphiodon peregrinorum Heckel, 1843; Scaphiodon socialis Heckel, 1843; Chondrostoma syriacum Valenciennes, 1844; Varicorhinus capoeta angorae Hankó, 1925; Capoeta angorae (Hankó, 1925); Barbus belayewi M. A. S. Menon, 1960; Capoeta capoeta kosswigi Karaman, 1969; Capoeta kosswigi Karaman, 1969

Species of fish

Capoeta damascina, the Levantine scraper, Mesopotamian barb, Ankara barb or Van barb is a species of freshwater ray-finned fish belonging to the family Cyprinidae, the carps and related fishes, and the subfamily Barbinae, the barbels. This species is found in southwestern Asia.

== Taxonomy ==
Capoeta damascina was first formally described as Gobio damascinus in 1842 by the French zoologist Achille Valenciennes in Volume 16 of Histoire naturelle des poissons, which Velnciennes co-authored with Georges Cuvier. The type locality of G. damascinus was given as Damascus in Syria. This species has been found to be classified within the Anatolian-Iranian clade within the genus Capoeta along with C. banarescui, C, buhsei and C. saadii. The genus Capoeta is classified in the subfamily Barbinae of the carp family Cyprinidae within the order Cypriniformes, the carp-like fishes.

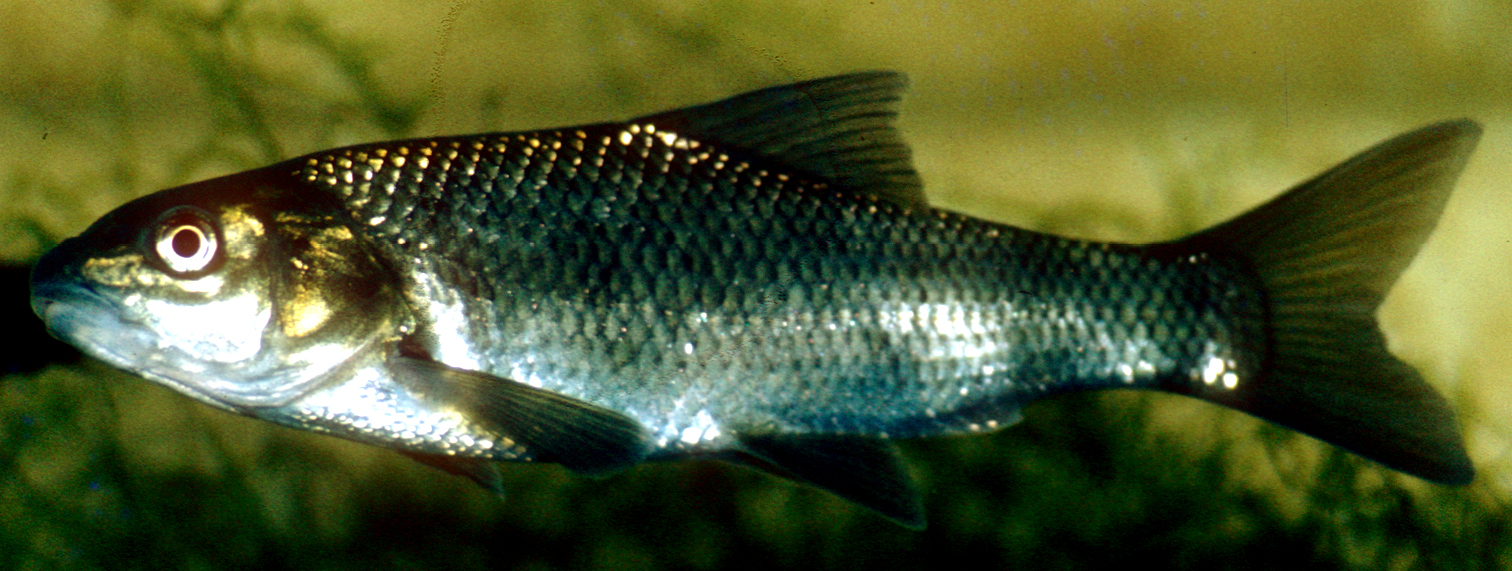
Carasobarbus canis x Capoeta damascina

C. damascina has been recorded hybridising with Carasobarbus canis but these hybrids are sterile.

== Etymology ==
Capoeta damascina is classified in the genus Capoeta and name derived from the word used for an egg-laden female of the type species of the genus, Capoeta capoeta, in the country of Georgia and in Armenia, kapwaeti. The specific name refers to the type locality, Damascus.

== Description ==
Capoeta damascina has a fusiform body and there are 4 spines and 8 fost rays in its dorsal fin. It reaches a maximum total length of 50 cm (20 in), although 29 cm (11 in) is more typical.

== Distribution and habitat ==
Capoeta damascina is found in southwestern Asia from rivers draining into the Mediterranean Sea in southeastern Turkey to Lebanon, in the Damascus basin, Jordan drainage and the southern tributaries of Dead Sea, as well as the Queiq and the Euphrates. Within its renage the Mesopotamian scraper occurs in a wide variety of permanent waterbodies at least seasonally where there is gravel or running water.

== Biology ==
Capoeta damascina is a benthopelagic fish, feeding on periphyton which is scraped from the substrate using the horny sheet on the lower lip. It feeds on algae, aquatic invertebrates, and detritus. Spawning occurs between January and March, the fish moving into small streams where the eggs are laid on gravel. The flesh is reputed to be tasteless fish, and the eggs are toxic.
