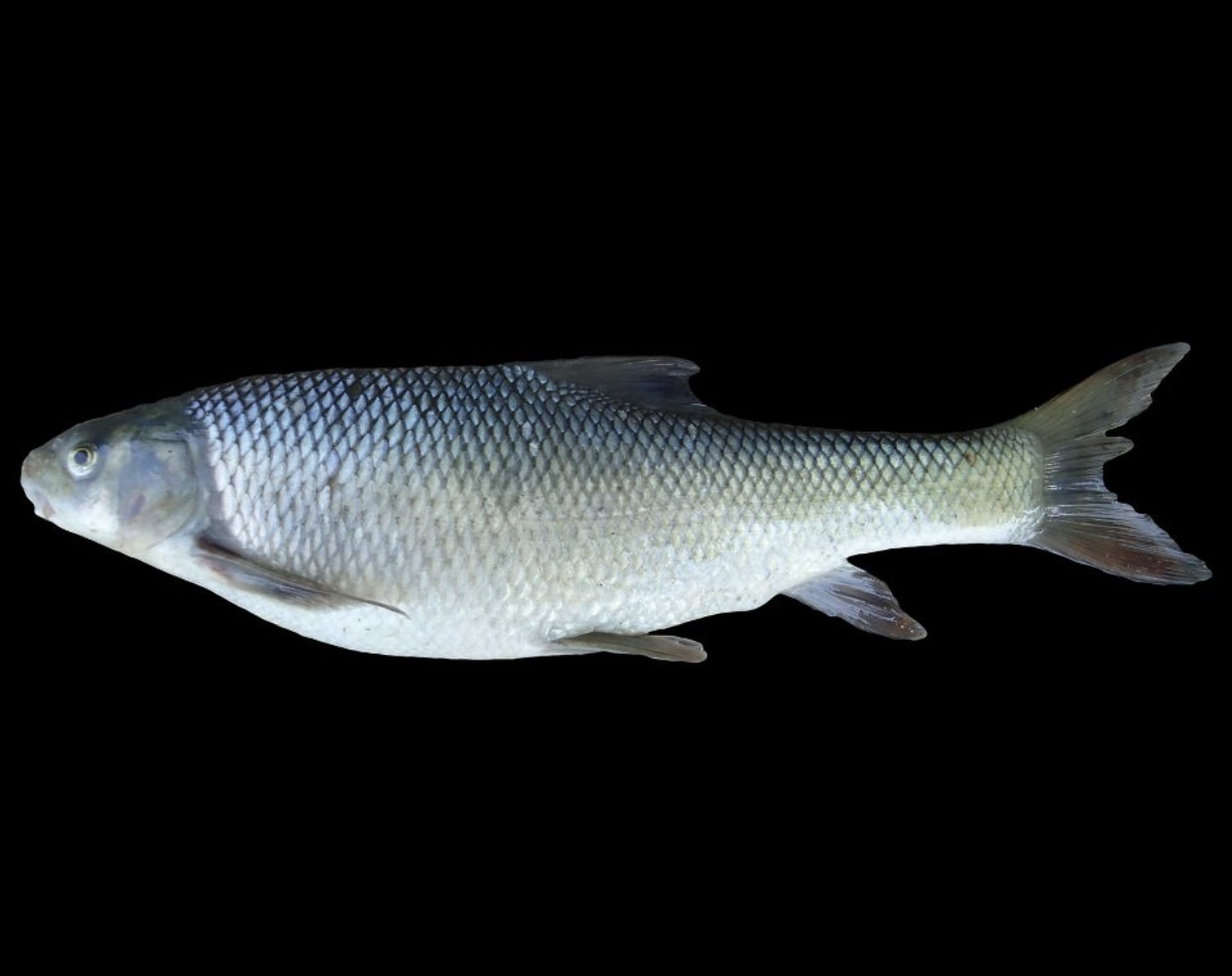

Scientific classification
- Kingdom: Animalia
- Phylum: Chordata
- Class: Actinopterygii
- Order: Cypriniformes
- Family: Cyprinidae
- Genus: Capoeta
- Species: C. kaput

Binomial name
- Capoeta kaput Levin, Prokofiev & Roubenyan, 2019

= Capoeta kaput =

Species of fish

Capoeta kaput is a species of algae eating scrapers discovered in 2019. Known locally as the Blue Aras scraper, this rare species prefers large rivers. It has not been evaluated by the IUCN yet but may need protection. The freshwater fish primarily inhabits rivers of the Araxes basin in Asia, and has been found so far in at least Armenia, Iran and Turkey. C. kaput can be distinguished by several physical markers, such as its nine dorsal branched rays (other species in the genus typically have eight), a larger number of vertebrae than most other species in the genus, and it is about 262 mm (10.3 in) in length. The species has been discovered recently enough that it's been the subject of relatively little research.

== Distribution ==
Capoeta kaput has been found in the Araxes River (which flows through Turkey, Armenia, Azerbaijan and Iran) and its tributaries the Akhuryan and Mezamor rivers. The species naturally lives in large freshwater rivers and co-occurs with C. capoeta. A 2020 research paper recorded finding C. kaput in a Turkish canal (B-20 canal at Aralık) and noted other recorded sightings in the Araxes River in Armenia and Turkey.

== Description ==
Capoeta kaput has a distinct dorsal body contour with no marked discontinuity between head and predorsal profile. Its greatest body depth is at the level of dorsal-fin origin. Its head is conical, with an almost straight dorsal profile, and a bluntly rounded snout. It has a wide mouth that is weakly arched, with a lower jaw covered by a sharp horny sheath. The rostral cap is well-developed, partly overlapping the upper lip, with only its maxillary barbel present. The dorsal-fin origin is anterior to the pelvic-fin origin. The last unbranched ray is thick and ossified, serrated in basal two-thirds, with a soft and flexible distal third.

== Habitat ==
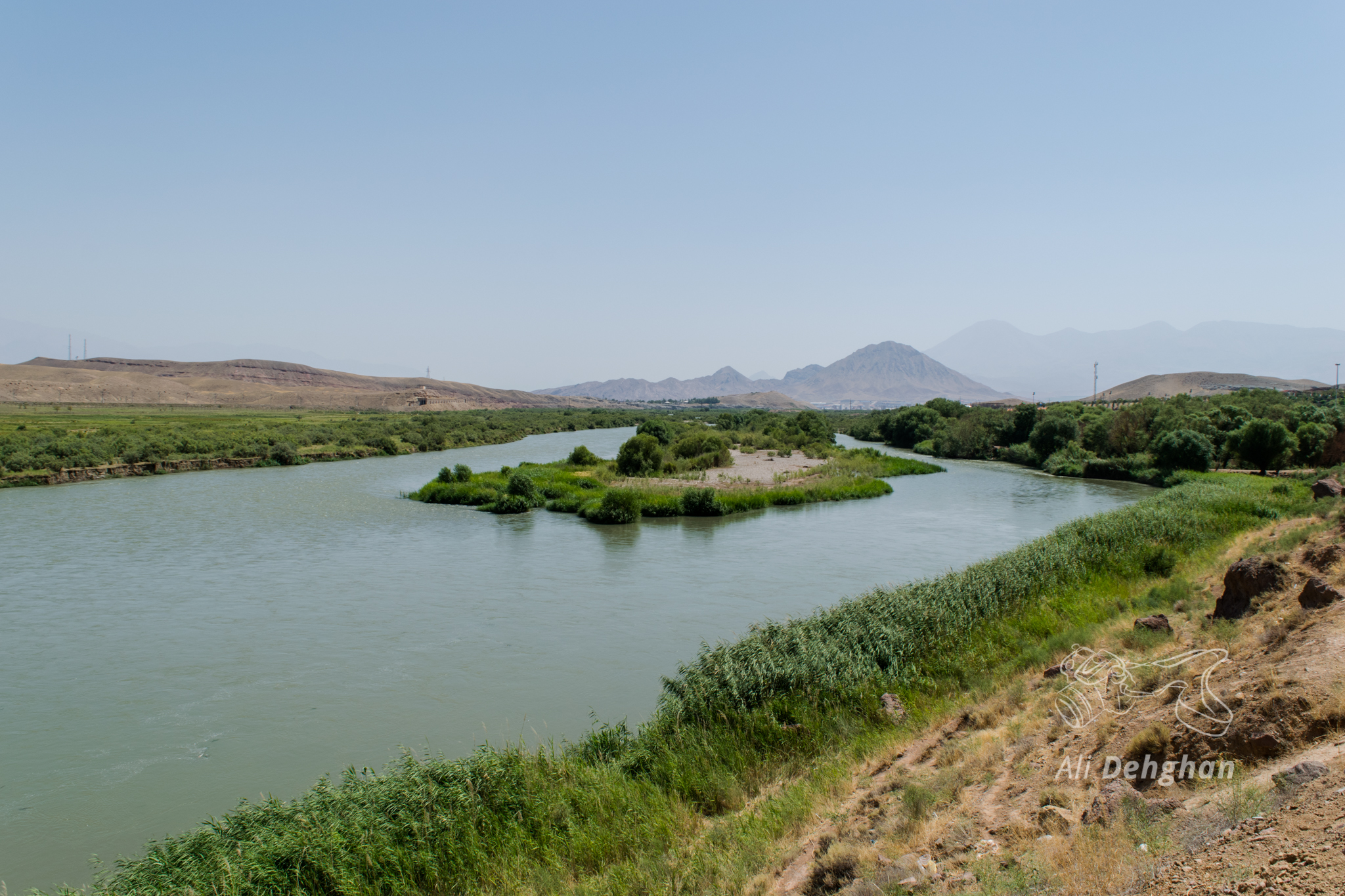
Aras River

Capoeta kaput prefers large freshwater rivers. The Araxes River, where the fish has been primarily found, has suffered from increased pollutants over the past 50–60 years, negatively impacting the wildlife in the river. The average temperature of the river basin is 9 °C (48 °F), and can vary from −4 to 22 °C (25 to 72 °F) throughout the year with hot summers and cold winters. Average annual precipitation is around 565 mm (22.2 in), though it varies per region.

== Morphology ==
Fish of the genus Capoeta are morphologically distinct because they have "inferior mouth[s] with the horny edge to the lower jaw" and a "short dorsal fin with seven to nine branched rays." There are three clades within the genus - Mesopotamian, Anatolian-Iranian and Aralo-Caspian - and about 30 recognized species. C. kaput is considered a member of the Aralo-Caspian clade.

Capoeta kaput has several physical differences from other species in its genus. It has nine dorsal branched rays, as compared to eight, and its body is a darker, more bluish color than other species of Capoeta. The fins on living fish also appear bluish. It has 46-48 vertebrae, more than most others in its genus, and its head is "deep" and "wide" with the "horny cutting edge on lower jaw variably arched." The fish also has thinner limbs at straighter angles than other species in its genus. It stays the same color throughout its life.

The species has a conical head with a rounded snout. Anal fins are larger and more pronounced on males, which grow tubercles there during mating season. They're known to grow as large as 454 mm (17.9 in), but based on interviews with local people, scientists believe that the fish may grow larger.

== Reproduction ==
Capoeta kaput has weak sexual dimorphism. Both sexes have breeding tubercles, but they are more pronounced in males. The breeding tubercles appear during spawn season at the anal fin rays.

== Etymology ==
"Kaput", the species name, translates to "blue" in Armenian, the color of the fish.

== Conservation status ==
Capoeta kaput has not been evaluated by the IUCN. The scientists who discovered it deemed it a rare species that likely needed protection. A more recent research paper, however, called C. kaput "a widespread species with no known major widespread threats" and argued it should be classified as "least concern".
