= Onychostoma macrolepis =

Conservation status
- Least Concern (IUCN 3.1)

Scientific classification
- Kingdom: Animalia
- Phylum: Chordata
- Class: Actinopterygii
- Division: Teleostei
- Order: Cypriniformes
- Family: Cyprinidae
- Genus: Onychostoma
- Species: O. macrolepis

Binomial name
- Onychostoma macrolepis (Bleeker, 1871)

Species of fish

Onychostoma macrolepis (Bleeker, 1871) is a small-sized freshwater cyprinid in the subfamily Acrossocheilinae, and is native to cool, fast-flowing waters such as mountain streams and upper reaches of rivers, fast streams in Central China. O. macrolepis is a rare and endangered cavefish species in the wild, but amenable to aquaculture,. Its common name, Large-scale shovel-jawed fish, is derived from the direct translation of the Chinese common name "多鳞白甲鱼", which reads as "Duo-Lin-Bai-Jia-Yu",.

The Onychostoma genus possesses both ecological and aquaculture values. Overfishing and the excessive pursuit of non-cultured populations have led to a significant decline in wild populations, making them listed under National Class II protected wild animals in China. O. macrolepis is nutritious and has become increasingly economically valuable and highly prized fish in aquaculture.

== Identification ==
Onychostoma macrolepis is an spindle-shape cyprinid with a short, broad head and blunt snout,. A wide and under-body mouth is shovel-like, with a transversely cleft and two short pairs of barbels attached. The maxilla does not reach below the anterior margin of the orbit. The scales of O. macrolepis are relatively large and imbricate (having adjacent overlapping), with a lunate dark mark at the base, forming a shiny appearance. Fins are grayish to yellow-orange, with some having a dusky margin on the dorsal fin,.

Onychostoma macrolepis is a slow-growth species and exhibits sexual dimorphism (different appearance between sexes), with adult females being less than twice the size of adult males, Mean (±SD/Standard Deviation) measurements of O. macrolepis include body mass of 78.06 ± 24.97 g, total length of 204.03 ± 26.83 mm (millimeter), standard length of 163.34 ± 26.01 mm, body width of 22.82 ± 2.89 mm, and body depth of 35.97 ± 3.65 mm. The body shape of Onychostoma macrolepis is more slender than the other two Onychostoma genus species, Onychostoma sima and Onychostoma gerlachi, with the largest body length to depth ratio, which is 3.6–4.9. The longer body makes its host the largest number of 51–55 lateral line scales among the three Onychostoma species. O. macrolepis lacks a hump anterior to the dorsal fin, which is commonly found in O. sima. Juveniles are a slimmer resemblance to adults with a bigger eye proportion on the head and a paler coloration.

== Systematics ==
Species: Onychostoma macrolepis (Bleeker, 1871)). Synonyms: Gymnostomus macrolepis (Bleeker, 1871).

Another common name for O. macrolepis is 多鳞铲颌鱼 in Shennongjia, Hubei. Direct translations of its trade name includes "money fish" in Qinba Mountainous Area for their scales resemble ancient copper coins, "spring fish" as they generally emerges like water gushing out from springs from caves in April or early May and usually breeds in cold water, and "Chi-Lin Fish" in Tai'an, Shandong, which means red-scale fish.

O. macrolepis diverged from common carp (Cyprinus carpio) approximately 24–25 million years ago, with an unambiguous correspondence in chromosomes to that of the zebrafish.

== Distribution and habitat ==
Onychostoma macrolepis is a freshwater cavefish species endemic to China. O. macrolepis overwinters in subterranean karst and caves and returns to open streams to spawn in the warmer spring and summer. It is the only cavefish species that lives in north China, with the rest living in the very southeast. Wild O. macrolepis are mostly seen in the Wei River, the Huai River, the upper and middle parts of the Yangtze River, and the upper parts of the Hai River. It also appears in the Mount Tai and Qinling Mountains. The cultured population is distributed across central China, mostly in the southern Qinling Mountains in Shaanxi Province. Independent of all other populations, the Tai'an population is geographically separated and distributed in the cold streams of the Mount Tai. In history, there was also no direct linkage among these waterways, but the Grand Canal was open to navigation and had passed through waterways near the Mount Tai Area.

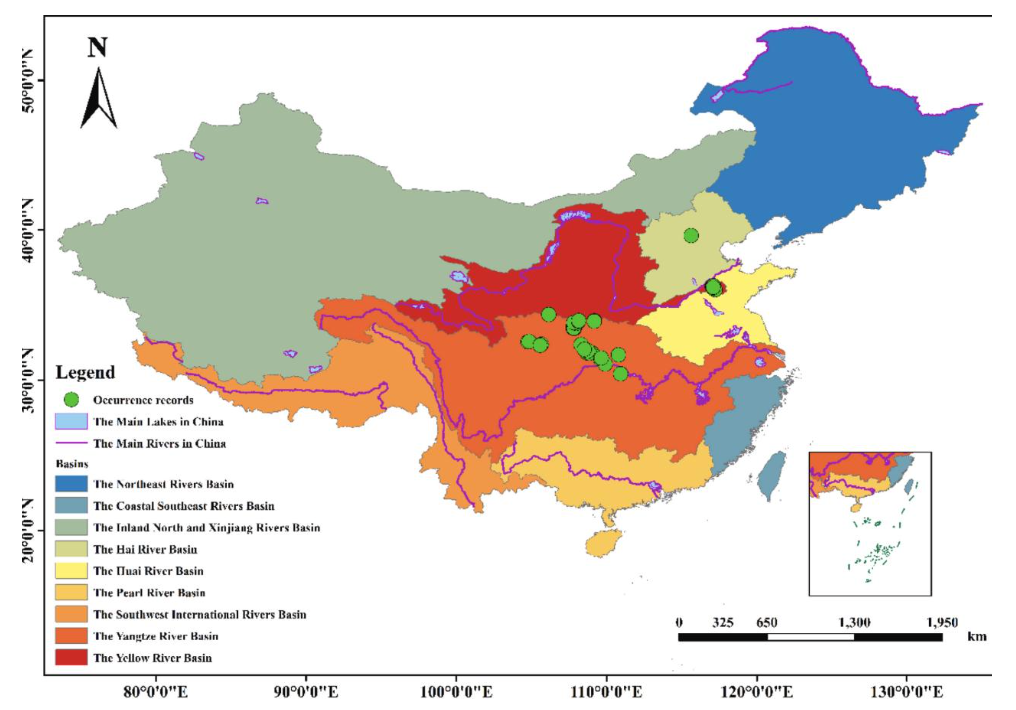
Distribution of O. macrolepis in green dots

Onychostoma macrolepis inhabits clear and cold water in the middle and lower river columns, active in rapid rivers and caves with fast-flowing water, often near springs and cave outlets. Habitats typically hold cobble to gravel substrate channels that contain adequate oxygen content at mid-elevations of roughly 300 to 1,500 meters (about 4921.26 ft).

== Life history ==
Onychostoma macrolepis is an atypical cavefish species that overwinters in karstic fissures and caves within river channels and breeds in mountain streams in northern China. O. macrolepis likes to swim upstream against the current and feed on organisms attached to rocks. Wild populations show a negative allometric growth, where length increases faster than mass, consistent with a streamlined, fast-current adapted body form. O. macrolepis exhibits a relatively rapid growth among juveniles, then a quick shift to slower somatic gain after maturity.

After hibernation, O. macrolepis emerges around midnight in mid-April, typically gathers and leaves in concentrated dense water pulses. Males generally reach sexual maturity at age 3 or older, whereas females mature at age of 4–5. Wild populations mainly age between 1–4 years, with the majority being 1–2 years.

=== Reproduction Cycle ===
Onychostoma macrolepis leaves winter caves and performs spawning aggregations in mountain streams around late spring to summer. The time required for embryonic development is roughly 47 hours under an optimal temperature of 22.5 to 24.5 °C, the most profound hatching enzyme degradation factor. When temperatures is above 25 °C, fertilization, hatching, and survival sharply reduces and deformities increases.

The mating orientation is with the head inward and tail outward. The spawning season extends from late May to late July, with fecundity around 6,000–12,000 eggs per female. Freshly laid eggs are buoyant and rounded, with a color of orange-yellow to pale-yellow in appearance. Egg diameter is about 1.165–1.182 mm without water absorption and roughly 2.138–2.145 mm after water absorption. Soon after fertilization, the eggs become adhesive for a couple of minutes, allowing attachment to nearby fine sand. The emergence of eggs usually is completed within 8–10 days.

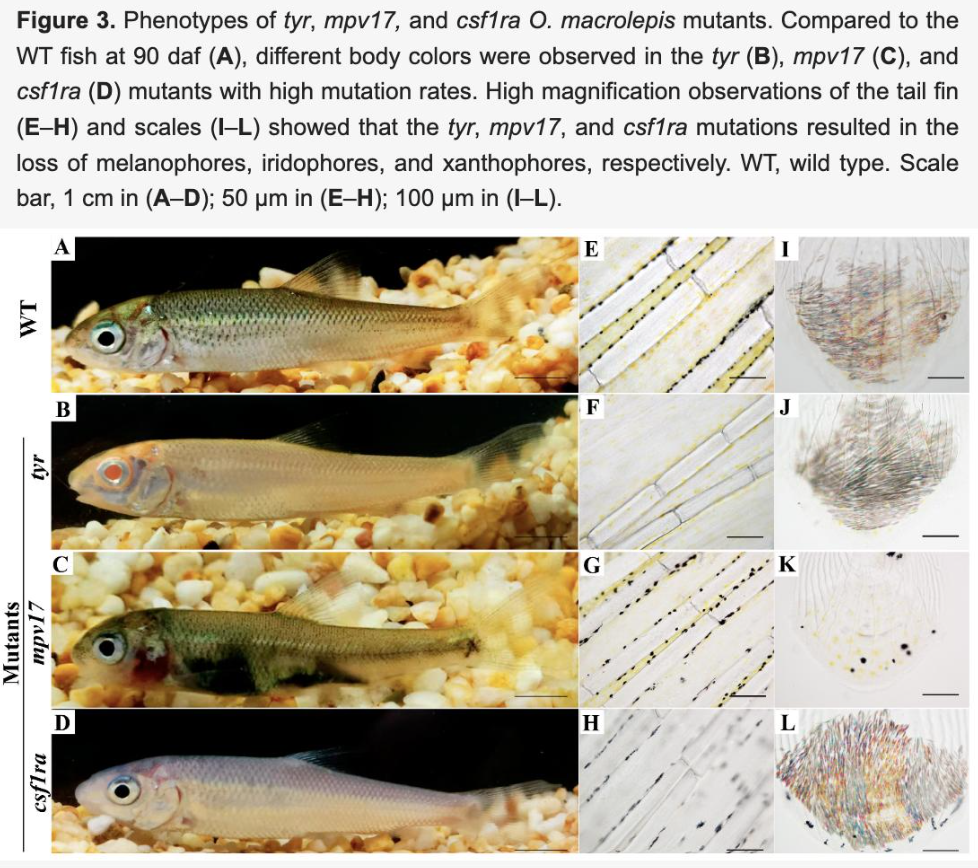
panel A shows common wild-type adult

=== Growth and Overwintering ===
Consistent with this size recorded in the sample populations and dimorphism, adult males averaged 49.05 ± 0.50 g (total length 173.56 ± 10.52 mm; standard length 148.53 ± 12.32 mm; body width 18.68 ± 3.43 mm; body depth 30.90 ± 5.56 mm), whereas adult females averaged 87.72 ± 19.34 g (total length 214.19 ± 21.46 mm; standard length 168.28 ± 29.47 mm; body width 24.20 ± 1.04 mm; body depth 37.66 ± 1.68 mm). Muscle composition of O. macrolepis highlights a high crude protein of 21.28% and comparatively low moisture of 76.29%, marking it as a high-protein, low-lipid freshwater species.

Age and growth parameters are not well documented for wild populations, considering them listed as endangered. But lab and cultured populations show that juveniles can be reared on plant oil or fish oil diets that influence growth and flesh quality. Essential fatty acids from fish oil are required for juveniles to reach optimal performance. Black soldier fly oil can substitute 25–50% of fish oil in their diet.

Overwintering cave use is associated with low temperatures and reduced metabolism. They mainly use energy stored in lipids from the liver, muscle, and adipose tissue.

=== Feeding ===
The mouth of Large-scale shovel-jawed fish is wide and facing downward, with the lower jaw bearing a keratin cutting edge, suited for benthic scraping. Green-colored stones covered by algae at feeding sites are typically left with white-spotted scrape marks. Its diet consists of aquatic invertebrates, biofilm, and algae attached to the surfaces of gravel and cobbles.

O. macrolepis exhibits resilience to both short and prolonged food deprivation, which is also common in many fish species. Food restriction is likely to occur under various environmental stressors, such as population competition, unequal spatial distribution of food, seasonal variations, and ecological instability.

== Conservation status and threats ==
=== Listing ===
In the nationally released China Biodiversity Red List (2020 edition), O. macrolepis is listed as Vulnerable (VU) under criteria A2bcd: Vertebrates. 2021 National Key Protected Wild Animals List, published by the National Forestry and Grassland Administration and the Ministry of Agriculture and Rural Affairs, classifying O. macrolepis as a National Class II protected wild animal, with notes indicating the listing is only for aquatic wild animals and limited to wild populations. However, in US the evaluation, the Global IUCN accessed O. macrolepis as Least Concern (LC) on 1 March 2007 with no further investigation afterwards; CITES and CMS haven't evaluated this species.

=== Threats and Future ===
Onychostoma macrolepis is considered delicious with the capability of nourishing eyes and promoting lactation, resulting in a high price and being highly favored by consumers. Worldwide, few ecosystems are more at risk than those in caves and karst landscapes for being extra fragile, inhabiting many endemic species, which are especially vulnerable to environmental changes. Nowadays, overfishing, the construction of water conservancy facilities, and pollution have damaged the natural environment for wild O. macrolepis populations, and sharply decreased their populations. The construction of hydropower and impoundments threatens O. macrolepis and fragments their habitats with an increasing uninhabitable warm water column and blocking cave connectivity. The wild population shows a young-skewed age structure, indicating overharvesting.

Future estimations of possible habitats built under multiple models for O. macrolepis predict an average of 20,901.75 km^2(about the area of New Jersey) decrease and a shift to northeast or northwest. Temperature rise is more important than participation change.

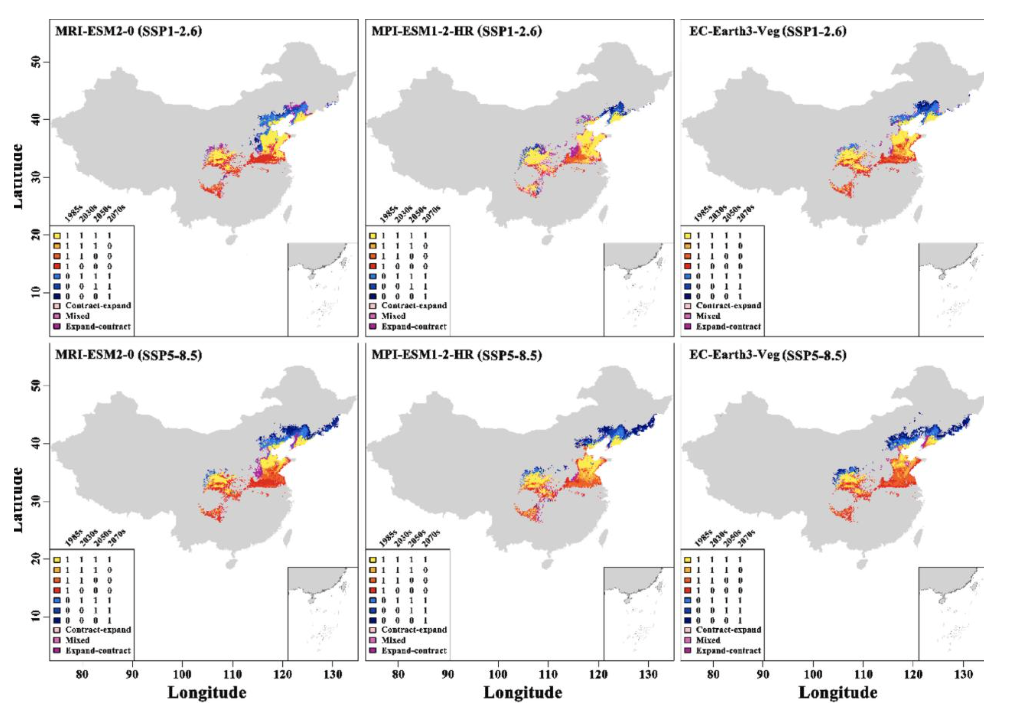
Future estimations of possible habitats built under multiple models for O. macrolepis predict an average of 20,901.75 km^2 (

=== Human Use and Aquaculture ===
O. macrolepis is considered a tasty food fish species in parts of China and has high nutritional value. The price of O. macrolepis in China is twenty times higher than Common carp (Cyprinus carpio), another common commercial cyprinid species. With a huge decline in wild populations, the demand for O. macrolepis farming has grown in popularity for a while and continues to expand. The major locations for its fishery are in Ankang City, Shaanxi Province. Small entities are in Tai'an for reintroduction to the wild and stock enhancement.

O. macrolepis shows good stress tolerance and is of high performance at relatively high stocking densities, which supports the possibility of pond and raceway culture. Gou et al. have revealed the mechanism behind starvation, indicating possible strategy can be adapted to reduce feed wastage and labor inputs, thereby improving profitability in aquaculture.

The transformation of the aquaculture industry has begun. The O. macrolepis fishery in Qinba Mountainous Area has gradually shifted to the local wild native cold-water. One major reason is that O. macrolepis in aquaculture shows a low degree of polymorphism, and their phylogenetic relationships are dominated by geographical differences. Three farm populations from different breeding sites are exposed to long-term interbreeding and small genetic divergence, suggesting a high risk of germplasm degradation (the gradual loss of genetic variability and fitness in cultured lines due to inbreeding, genetic drift, or repeated use of a narrow brood stock base). Hybridization among different populations can mitigate this risk and enhance genetic diversity.

== Cultural aspect ==
O. macrolepis in ancient China was a precious tribute to the emperor, and only people of high status could receive it.

Famous Chinese poet Li Bai (701AC–762AC), living in the Tang Dynasty, has written an experience of eating O. macrolepis in his poem, 酬中都小吏携斗酒双鱼于逆旅见赠, as "汶鱼紫锦鳞". He depicted O. macrolepis as having purple-ish shiny scales that look like brocade, and at that time, the fish was called "汶鱼", meaning "fish of the Wen district", and "Wen district" is around Mountain Tai Area. The poet was complimenting the generosity of local beadles who brought O. macrolepis and supports indicated in these actions during the poet's exile from the court.
