= Capoeta caelestis =

Conservation status
- Least Concern (IUCN 3.1)

Scientific classification
- Kingdom: Animalia
- Phylum: Chordata
- Class: Actinopterygii
- Order: Cypriniformes
- Family: Cyprinidae
- Subfamily: Barbinae
- Genus: Capoeta
- Species: C. caelestis

Binomial name
- Capoeta caelestis Schöter, Özuluğ & Freyhof, 2009

Species of fish

Capoeta caelestis, the Taurus scraper, is a species of freshwater cyprinid fish endemic to southern Anatolia, Turkey. It has a max length of 19.6 cm (7.7 in) long.

It is not widespread but inhabits many kinds of streams and habitats and is often quite abundant. It spawns in fast flowing waters. The range is from Ilica and Manavgat east to Göksu river.

Capoeta caelestis hybridizes in nature with Capoeta antalyensis, forming a hybrid zone.
