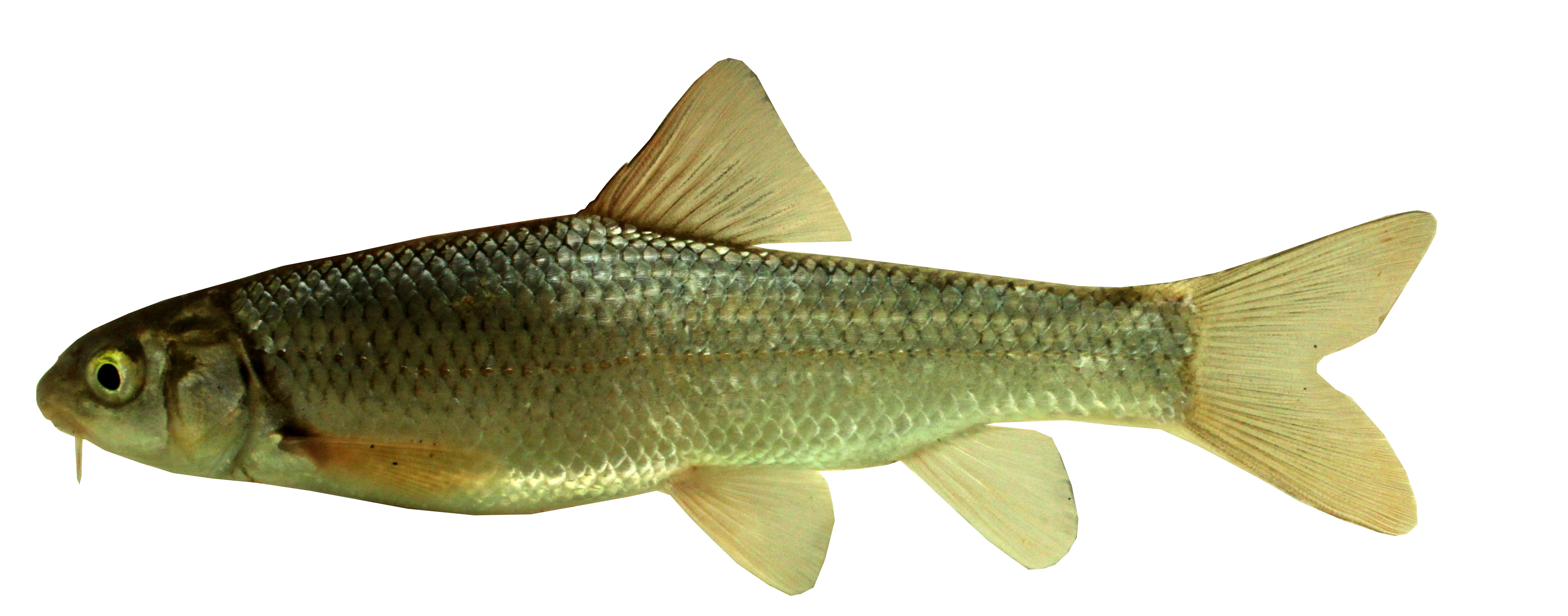

Scientific classification
- Kingdom: Animalia
- Phylum: Chordata
- Class: Actinopterygii
- Order: Cypriniformes
- Family: Cyprinidae
- Subfamily: Barbinae
- Genus: Capoeta
- Species: C. razii

Binomial name
- Capoeta razii Jouladeh-Roudbar, Eagderi, Ghanavi & Doadrio, 2017

= Capoeta razii =

Species of fish

Capoeta razii, is a newly described species of freshwater cyprinid fish occurring mainly in the southern Caspian Sea basin, Iran. This species was mistakenly reported by many authors as Capoeta gracilis in northern Iranian regions. It was first reported to be different from C. gracilis by Levin et al. (2012).

This species is named in honour of Abū Bakr Muhammad ibn Zakariyyā al-Rāzī, a Persian polymath, physician, alchemist, and philosopher, for his important contributions in the history of medicine. He also discovered numerous compounds including ethanol.

== Coloration ==
In life the upper part of the body is golden brown, olive-green, or silver, and the belly is whitish up to the lateral line. The head is dark-brown or olive-green on top and the cheeks are pale brown to white. Anal, pelvic, and pectoral fins are hyaline or light brown, and dorsal and caudal fins have a narrow black line on rays. In specimens smaller than 50 mm (2 in) SL, minute black spots are present on the flanks.

In preservation the dorsum is dark brown on back and flanks, and yellowish white on the belly. The dorsum of the head is dark brown, and the cheeks beige. Fins are often light brown, and pelvic and anal fins may be yellowish to hyaline. Dorsal and caudal fins are darker than lower fins. The peritoneum is black.

== Distribution and habitat ==
Capoeta razii is found in many rivers and streams of the southern Caspian Sea basin. It is one of the most abundant species in the Caspian Sea basin along with the members of the genus Alburnoides Jeitteles, 1861. At the Kheyroud River (type locality), the current was medium to fast, river width was between 3–14 m (10–46 ft) and the maximum depth was around one metre (3 ft), the stream bed was composed of cobbles and gravel, and the riparian vegetation type was deciduous forests.

The following fish species co-exist with C. razii in type locality: Ponticola iranicus Vasil’eva, Mousavi-Sabet & Vasil’ev 2015, Alburnoides tabarestanensis Mousavi-Sabet, Anvarifar & Azizi, 2015, Alburnus chalcoides (Güldenstädt 1772), Barbus cyri De Filippi 1865, Squalius turcicus De Filippi 1865, Luciobarbus capito Güldenstädt, 1773, Luciobarbus mursa Güldenstädt, 1773, Cobitis faridpaki Mousavi-Sabet, Vasil’eva, Vatandoust & Vasil’ev 2011. Capoeta razii is known from most of the rivers and streams between Atrak and Kote komeh (Near Astara city) rivers in the southern Caspian Sea basin.
