= Altigena laticeps =

Scientific classification
- Kingdom: Animalia
- Phylum: Chordata
- Class: Actinopterygii
- Order: Cypriniformes
- Family: Cyprinidae
- Subfamily: Labeoninae
- Genus: Altigena
- Species: A. laticeps

Binomial name
- Altigena laticeps (Wu & Lin, 1977)

Synonyms
- Sinilabeo laticeps (Wu & Lin, 1977); Sinilabeo tonkinensis laticeps Wu & Lin, 1977

Species of fish

Altigena laticeps is a species of cyprinid fish found in the Upper Mekong River basin in Yunnan, China. It was formerly considered a subspecies of Altigena tonkinensis.

== Etymology ==
The specific epithet laticeps derives from the Latin latus, wide or broad; and -ceps meaning "head".

== Description ==
It can grow to 23.8 cm (9.4 in) standard length.
