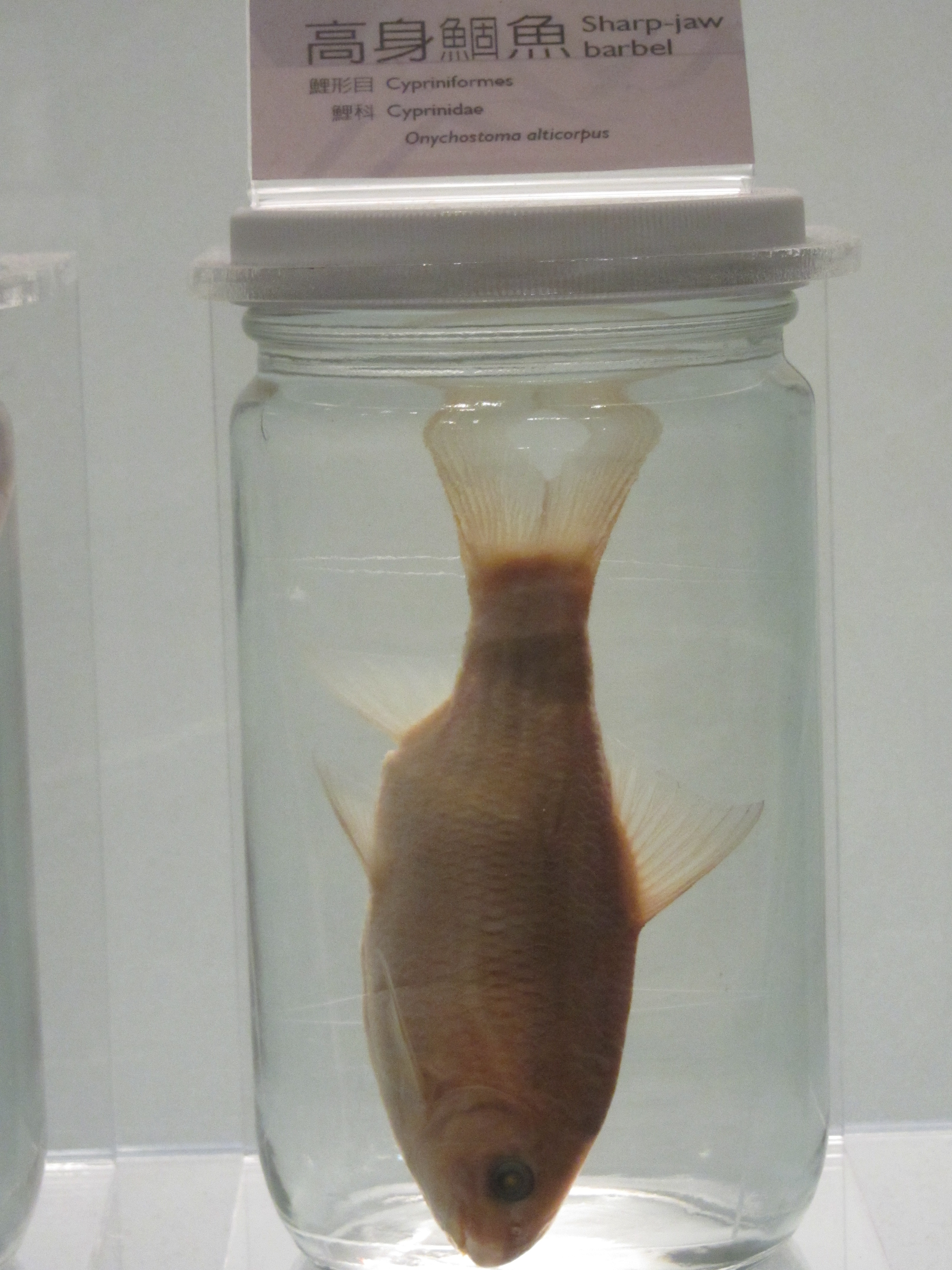
- Onychostoma alticorpus

Scientific classification
- Kingdom: Animalia
- Phylum: Chordata
- Class: Actinopterygii
- Order: Cypriniformes
- Family: Cyprinidae
- Subfamily: Acrossocheilinae
- Genus: Onychostoma; Günther, 1896

Type species
- Onychostoma laticeps Günther, 1896

Synonyms
- Scaphiodontella Ōshima, 1920

= Onychostoma =

Genus of fishes

Onychostoma is a genus of cyprinid fish found in East Asia.

== Species ==
These are the currently recognized species in this genus:

- Onychostoma alticorpus (Ōshima, 1920) (Taiwan ku fish)
- Onychostoma angustistomatum (Fang, 1940)
- Onychostoma barbatulum (Pellegrin 1908)
- Onychostoma barbatum (Lin, 1931)
- Onychostoma brevibarba Song, Cao & Zhang, 2018
- Onychostoma breve (Wu & Chen, 1977)
- Onychostoma dongnaiense Hoàng, Phạm & Trần, 2015 (Dongnai srang)
- Onychostoma elongatum (Pellegrin & Chevey, 1934)
- Onychostoma fangi Kottelat, 2000
- Onychostoma fusiforme Kottelat, 1998
- Onychostoma gerlachi (Peters, 1881)
- Onychostoma krongnoense Hoàng, Phạm & Trần, 2015 (Krongno srang)
- Onychostoma lepturus (Boulenger, 1900)
- Onychostoma lini (Wu 1939)
- Onychostoma macrolepis (Bleeker, 1871)
- Onychostoma meridionale Kottelat, 1998
- Onychostoma minnanense Jang-Liaw & Chen, 2013
- Onychostoma monticola (Günther, 1888)
- Onychostoma ovale Pellegrin & Chevey, 1936
- Onychostoma rarum (Lin, 1933)
- Onychostoma simum Sauvage & Dabry de Thiersant, 1874
- Onychostoma uniforme (Mai, 1978)
- Onychostoma virgulatum Xin, Zhang & Cao, 2009
- Onychostoma yunnanensis (Regan, 1904)
