= Altigena wui =

Conservation status
- Data Deficient (IUCN 3.1)

Scientific classification
- Kingdom: Animalia
- Phylum: Chordata
- Class: Actinopterygii
- Order: Cypriniformes
- Family: Cyprinidae
- Subfamily: Labeoninae
- Genus: Altigena
- Species: A. wui

Binomial name
- Altigena wui (Zheng & Chen, 1983)

Synonyms
- Bangana wui Sinilabeo discognathoides wui

Species of fish

Altigena wui is a species of cyprinid fish endemic to China.
