= Altigena binhluensis =

Conservation status
- Data Deficient (IUCN 3.1)

Scientific classification
- Kingdom: Animalia
- Phylum: Chordata
- Class: Actinopterygii
- Division: Teleostei
- Order: Cypriniformes
- Family: Cyprinidae
- Genus: Altigena
- Species: A. binhluensis

Binomial name
- Altigena binhluensis (V. H. Nguyễn, 2001)

Synonyms
- Sinilabeo binhluensis V. H. Nguyễn, 2001

Species of fish

Altigena binhluensis is a species of freshwater ray-finned fish belonging to the family Cyprinidae, the family which includes the carps, barbs. minnows and related fishes. It inhabits Vietnam and is considered harmless to humans. It has been assessed as "data deficient" by the IUCN Red List.
