= Altigena zhui =

Conservation status
- Critically endangered, possibly extinct (IUCN 3.1)

Scientific classification
- Kingdom: Animalia
- Phylum: Chordata
- Class: Actinopterygii
- Order: Cypriniformes
- Family: Cyprinidae
- Subfamily: Labeoninae
- Genus: Altigena
- Species: A. zhui

Binomial name
- Altigena zhui (Zheng & Chen, 1989)

Synonyms
- Bangana zhui; Sinilabeo zhui

Species of fish

Altigena zhui is a species of cyprinid fish endemic to China.
