= Capoeta pyragyi =

Scientific classification
- Kingdom: Animalia
- Phylum: Chordata
- Class: Actinopterygii
- Order: Cypriniformes
- Family: Cyprinidae
- Genus: Capoeta
- Species: C. pyragyi

Binomial name
- Capoeta pyragyi Jouladeh-Roudbar, Eagderi, Murillo-Ramos, Ghanavi & Doadrio, 2017

Species of fish

Capoeta pyragyi is a species of cyprinid in the genus Capoeta. It lives in the Tireh and Sezar rivers of Iran, and it is named after Turkmen poet and spiritual leader Magtymguly Pyragy.
