= Onychostoma fangi =

Scientific classification
- Kingdom: Animalia
- Phylum: Chordata
- Class: Actinopterygii
- Order: Cypriniformes
- Family: Cyprinidae
- Genus: Onychostoma
- Species: O. fangi

Binomial name
- Onychostoma fangi Kottelat, 2000

Species of fish

Onychostoma fangi is a species of cyprinid in the genus Onychostoma. It inhabits China and Vietnam and has a maximum length of 29.5 centimetres (11.6 in) and maximum published weight of 220.30 grams (7.771 oz).
