= Onychostoma uniforme =

Scientific classification
- Kingdom: Animalia
- Phylum: Chordata
- Class: Actinopterygii
- Order: Cypriniformes
- Family: Cyprinidae
- Genus: Onychostoma
- Species: O. uniforme

Binomial name
- Onychostoma uniforme (Mai, 1978)

Species of fish

Onychostoma uniforme is a species of cyprinid in the genus Onychostoma. It inhabits Vietnam and is not considered harmful to humans.
