= Decorus =

Scientific classification
- Kingdom: Animalia
- Phylum: Chordata
- Class: Actinopterygii
- Order: Cypriniformes
- Family: Cyprinidae
- Subfamily: Labeoninae
- Genus: Decorus; Zheng, Chen & Yang, 2019

Type species
- Labeo decorus Peters, 1881

Genus of fishes

Decorus is a genus of cyprinid freshwater fish found in China and India. This genus was split from Bangana in 2019.

The generic name is Latin for "beautiful" and is tautonymous with the type species.

== Species ==
There are currently five recognized species in this genus.

- Decorus decorus (Peters, 1881)
- Decorus lemassoni Pellegrin & Chevey, 1936)
- Decorus rendahli (Kimura, 1934)
- Decorus tungting (Nichols, 1925)
- Decorus xanthogenys (Pellegrin & Chevey, 1936)
