= Decorus xanthogenys =

Conservation status
- Data Deficient (IUCN 3.1)

Scientific classification
- Kingdom: Animalia
- Phylum: Chordata
- Class: Actinopterygii
- Order: Cypriniformes
- Family: Cyprinidae
- Subfamily: Labeoninae
- Genus: Decorus
- Species: D. xanthogenys

Binomial name
- Decorus xanthogenys (Pellegrin & Chevey, 1936)

Synonyms
- Labeo xanthogenys Pellegrin & Chevey, 1936; Bangana xanthogenys (Pellegrin & Chevey, 1936); Sinilabeo decorus xanthogenys (Pellegrin & Chevey, 1936); Sinilabeo xanthogenys (Pellegrin & Chevey, 1936); Altigena dorsoarcus Đ. Y. Mai, 1978; Altigena tetrabarbata Đ. Y. Mai, 1978; Sinilabeo xanthogenys songloensis V. H. Nguyễn, 2005

Species of fish

Decorus xanthogenys is a species of freshwater ray-finned fish belonging to the family Cyprinidae, the carps, barbs, minnows and related fishes. This fish is endemic to the basin of the Red River in Yunnan and northern Viet Nam.
