= Capoeta umbla =

Conservation status
- Least Concern (IUCN 3.1)

Scientific classification
- Kingdom: Animalia
- Phylum: Chordata
- Class: Actinopterygii
- Division: Teleostei
- Order: Cypriniformes
- Family: Cyprinidae
- Subfamily: Barbinae
- Genus: Capoeta
- Species: C. umbla

Binomial name
- Capoeta umbla (Heckel, 1843)

Species of fish

Capoeta umbla, also known as the Tigris scraper, is a Near East species of cyprinid fish. It grows up to 40 cm (16 in) standard length.

This species is widespread in the Tigris drainage, and has been recorded from Iran, Iraq, Syria and Turkey. It thrives in different kinds of waters, from small headwater streams to large lowland rivers, marshes, lakes and reservoirs. The species is not threatened.
