= Altigena lippa =

Conservation status
- Data Deficient (IUCN 3.1)

Scientific classification
- Kingdom: Animalia
- Phylum: Chordata
- Class: Actinopterygii
- Order: Cypriniformes
- Family: Cyprinidae
- Subfamily: Labeoninae
- Genus: Altigena
- Species: A. lippa

Binomial name
- Altigena lippa (Fowler, 1936)

Synonyms
- Labeo lippus Fowler, 1936; Bangana lippa (Fowler, 1936); Bangana lippus (Fowler, 1936); Sinilabeo laticeps Wu & Lin, 1977; Sinilabeo longirostris V. H. Nguyễn, 2001; Sinilabeo brevirostris V. H. Nguyen, 2001

Species of fish

Altigena lippa is a species of cyprinid fish found in the Mekong drainage in Laos, China, and Myanmar.
