= Scaphiodonichthys burmanicus =

Conservation status
- Least Concern (IUCN 3.1)

Scientific classification
- Kingdom: Animalia
- Phylum: Chordata
- Class: Actinopterygii
- Order: Cypriniformes
- Family: Cyprinidae
- Genus: Scaphiodonichthys
- Species: S. burmanicus

Binomial name
- Scaphiodonichthys burmanicus Vinciguerra, 1890

Species of fish

Scaphiodonichthys burmanicus is a species of cyprinid fish of the genus Scaphiodonichthys. It inhabits inland wetlands in Myanmar where it is locally used for food. It has been assessed as "least concern" on the IUCN Red List. It has a maximum length of 22 cm (8.7 in). It is considered harmless to humans.
