= Onychostoma minnanense =

Scientific classification
- Kingdom: Animalia
- Phylum: Chordata
- Class: Actinopterygii
- Order: Cypriniformes
- Family: Cyprinidae
- Genus: Onychostoma
- Species: O. minnanense

Binomial name
- Onychostoma minnanense Jang-Liaw & I. S. Chen, 2013

Species of fish

Onychostoma minnanense is a species of cyprinid in the genus Onychostoma. It inhabits Fujian, China and has a maximum length of 12.4 centimetres (4.9 in).
