= Decorus rendahli =

Scientific classification
- Kingdom: Animalia
- Phylum: Chordata
- Class: Actinopterygii
- Order: Cypriniformes
- Family: Cyprinidae
- Subfamily: Labeoninae
- Genus: Decorus
- Species: D. rendahli

Binomial name
- Decorus rendahli (Kimura, 1934)

Synonyms
- Labeo rendahli Kimura, 1934; Bangana rendahli (Kimura, 1934); Sinilabeo rendahli (Kimura, 1934); Sinilabeo rendahli rendahli (Kimura, 1934)

Species of fish from China

Decorus rendahli is a species of freshwater ray-finned fish belonging to the family Cyprinidae, the carps, barbs, minnows and related fishes. This fish is endemic to China, where it has been recorded from the basin of the Yangtze.
