= Capoeta aculeata =

Scientific classification
- Kingdom: Animalia
- Phylum: Chordata
- Class: Actinopterygii
- Order: Cypriniformes
- Family: Cyprinidae
- Subfamily: Barbinae
- Genus: Capoeta
- Species: C. aculeata

Binomial name
- Capoeta aculeata (Valenciennes, 1844)

Synonyms
- Varicorhinus bergi Derjavin, 1929; Scaphiodon macrolepis Heckel, 1847

Species of fish

Capoeta aculeata is a cyprinid fish endemic to Iran. It is close to Capoeta capoeta and has sometimes been considered either synonymous with it or a subspecies Capoeta capoeta aculeata. However, Coad & Krupp concluded, on morphological grounds, that it deserves to be a valid species. This species has been reported from several water bodies in Iran, including Armand River, Kaaj River, Chaghakhor Lagoon, Gandoman Lagoon, Gizehrud River, Na’in, Kor River, Namak Lake, and Zayandeh Rud River.
