= Altigena =

Scientific classification
- Kingdom: Animalia
- Phylum: Chordata
- Class: Actinopterygii
- Order: Cypriniformes
- Family: Cyprinidae
- Subfamily: Labeoninae
- Genus: Altigena; Burton, 1934

Type species
- Varicorhinus discognathoides Nichols & Pope, 1927

Synonyms
- Vinalabeo Nguyen V. H., Nguyen H. D. & Nguyen T. D. P., 2016

Genus of fishes

Altigena is a genus of cyprinid freshwater fish found in the continental part of South East Asia. This genus was resurrected from Bangana by Maurice Kottelat in 2017.

The generic name was originally intended as a subgenus of Osteochilus by a Chinese author Lin, and describes the distinguishing feature, alluding to altus, "high" and γένυς (génys), "chin". As Lin did not designate a type species, authorship was granted to Burton, the editor of the Zoological Record.

== Species ==
Altigena contains the following valid species:

- Altigena binhluensis (V. H. Nguyen, 2002)
- Altigena daos (V. H. Nguyễn, 2001)
- Altigena discognathoides (Nichols & Pope, 1927)
- Altigena elegans (Kottelat, 1998)
- Altigena laticeps (H. W. Wu & R. D. Lin, 1977)
- Altigena lippa (Fowler, 1936)
- Altigena loos (V. H. Nguyễn, 2001)
- Altigena malihkaia L. P. Zheng, T. Qin & X. Y. Chen, 2018
- Altigena sinkleri (Fowler, 1934)
- Altigena tonkinensis (Pellegrin & Chevey, 1934)
- Altigena wui (C. Y. Zheng & Y. R. Chen, 1983)
- Altigena yunnanensis (H. W. Wu & R. D. Lin, 1977)
- Altigena zhui (C. Y. Zheng & Chen, 1989)
