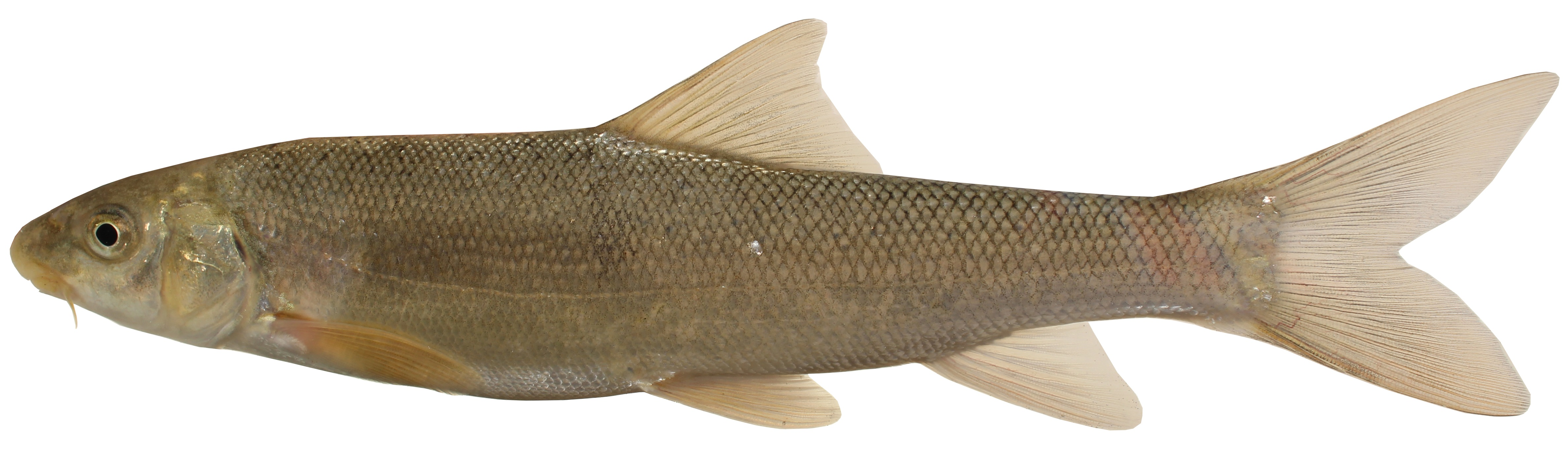

Scientific classification
- Kingdom: Animalia
- Phylum: Chordata
- Class: Actinopterygii
- Order: Cypriniformes
- Family: Cyprinidae
- Genus: Capoeta
- Species: C. ferdowsii

Binomial name
- Capoeta ferdowsii Jouladeh-Roudbar, Eagderi, Murillo-Ramos, Ghanavi & Doadrio, 2017

= Capoeta ferdowsii =

Species of fish

Capoeta ferdowsii is a species of cyprinid in the genus Capoeta, native the Zohreh and Fahlian rivers in Iran. It is named after Persian poet Ferdowsi.
