= Altigena sinkleri =

Conservation status
- Data Deficient (IUCN 3.1)

Scientific classification
- Kingdom: Animalia
- Phylum: Chordata
- Class: Actinopterygii
- Order: Cypriniformes
- Family: Cyprinidae
- Subfamily: Labeoninae
- Genus: Altigena
- Species: A. sinkleri

Binomial name
- Altigena sinkleri (Fowler, 1934)

Synonyms
- Bangana sinkleri Labeo sinkleri

Species of fish

Altigena sinkleri is a species of cyprinid fish endemic to the Chao Phraya River basin in Thailand.
