= Onychostoma dongnaiense =

Scientific classification
- Domain: Eukaryota
- Kingdom: Animalia
- Phylum: Chordata
- Class: Actinopterygii
- Order: Cypriniformes
- Family: Cyprinidae
- Genus: Onychostoma
- Species: O. dongnaiense

Binomial name
- Onychostoma dongnaiense H. Đ. Hoàng, H. M. Phạm & N. T. Trần, 2015

Species of fish

Onychostoma dongnaiense is a species of cyprinid in the genus Onychostoma. It inhabits the Đồng Nai river in Vietnam and has a maximum length of 2.0 centimetres (0.79 in).
