= Onychostoma meridionale =

Scientific classification
- Kingdom: Animalia
- Phylum: Chordata
- Class: Actinopterygii
- Order: Cypriniformes
- Family: Cyprinidae
- Genus: Onychostoma
- Species: O. meridionale

Binomial name
- Onychostoma meridionale Kottelat, 1998

Species of fish

Onychostoma meridionale is a species of cyprinid in the genus Onychostoma. It inhabits Southeast Asia and is considered "least concern" by the IUCN. It has a maximum length of 14.0 centimetres (5.5 in).
