= Capoeta alborzensis =

Scientific classification
- Kingdom: Animalia
- Phylum: Chordata
- Class: Actinopterygii
- Order: Cypriniformes
- Family: Cyprinidae
- Genus: Capoeta
- Species: C. alborzensis

Binomial name
- Capoeta alborzensis Jouladeh-Roudbar, Eagderi, Ghanavi & Doadrio 2016

Species of fish

Capoeta alborzensis is a species of cyprinid in the genus Capoeta.
