= Scaphiodonichthys =

Scientific classification
- Kingdom: Animalia
- Phylum: Chordata
- Class: Actinopterygii
- Order: Cypriniformes
- Family: Cyprinidae
- Subfamily: Barbinae
- Genus: Scaphiodonichthys; Vinciguerra, 1890

Type species
- Scaphiodonichthys burmanicus Vinciguerra, 1890

Synonyms
- Scaphiodontopsis Fowler, 1934

Genus of fishes

Scaphiodonichthys is a genus of cyprinid fish found in eastern Asia. There are currently three described species in this genus.

== Species ==
- Scaphiodonichthys acanthopterus (Fowler, 1934)
- Scaphiodonichthys burmanicus Vinciguerra, 1890
- Scaphiodonichthys macracanthus (Pellegrin & Chevey, 1936)
