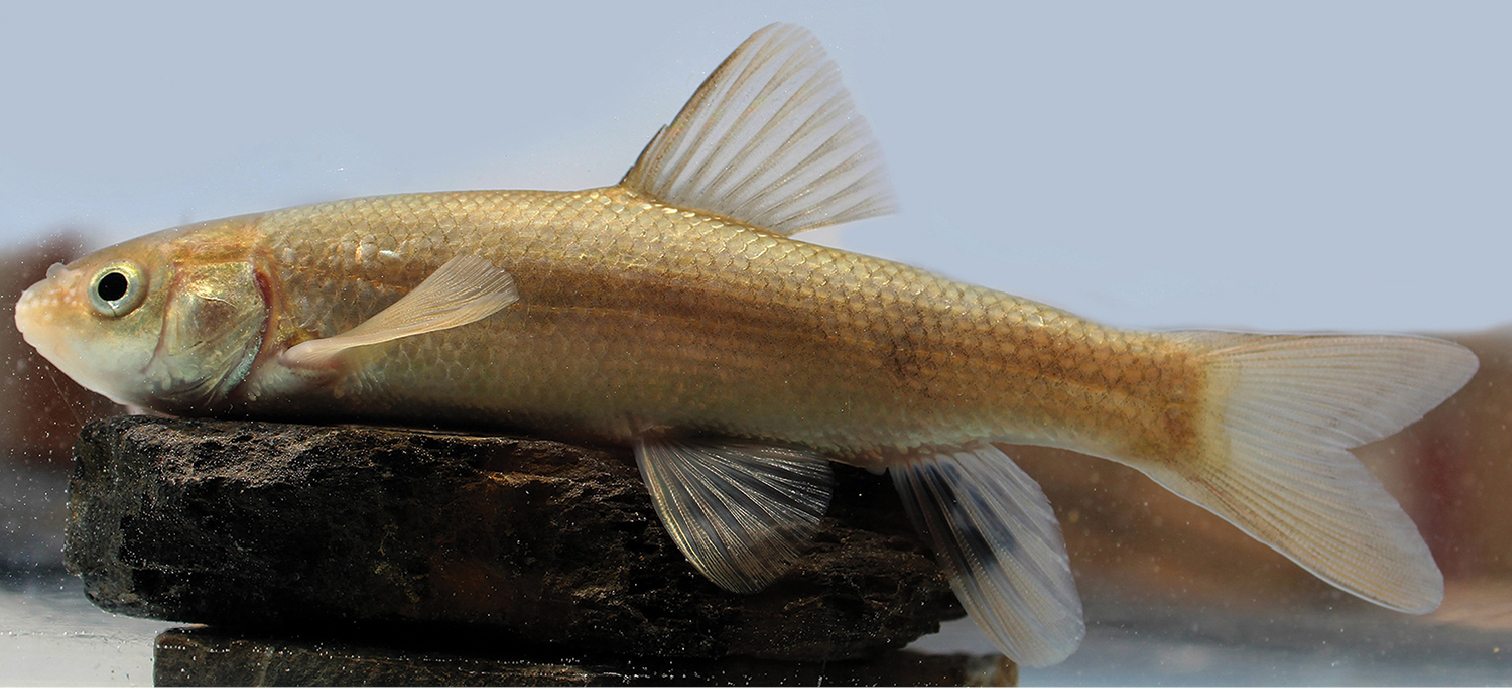

Scientific classification
- Domain: Eukaryota
- Kingdom: Animalia
- Phylum: Chordata
- Class: Actinopterygii
- Order: Cypriniformes
- Family: Cyprinidae
- Subfamily: Barbinae
- Genus: Capoeta
- Species: C. fusca

Binomial name
- Capoeta fusca (Nikolskii, 1897)

Synonyms
- Capoeta nudiventris Nikolskii, 1897

= Capoeta fusca =

Species of fish

Capoeta fusca is a species of ray-finned fish endemic to Iran. It was first described by Alexander Nikolsky in 1897.
