= Onychostoma elongatum =

Scientific classification
- Domain: Eukaryota
- Kingdom: Animalia
- Phylum: Chordata
- Class: Actinopterygii
- Order: Cypriniformes
- Family: Cyprinidae
- Genus: Onychostoma
- Species: O. elongatum

Binomial name
- Onychostoma elongatum (Pellegrin & Chevey, 1934)

Species of fish

Onychostoma elongatum is a species of cyprinid in the genus Onychostoma. It inhabits Laos and Vietnam and has a maximum length of 11.5 centimetres (4.5 in).
