= Capoeta gracilis =

Scientific classification
- Kingdom: Animalia
- Phylum: Chordata
- Class: Actinopterygii
- Order: Cypriniformes
- Family: Cyprinidae
- Subfamily: Barbinae
- Genus: Capoeta
- Species: C. gracilis

Binomial name
- Capoeta gracilis (Keyserling, 1861)

Synonyms
- Scaphiodon gracilis Keyserling, 1861

Species of fish

Capoeta gracilis is a species of fish in the family Cyprinidae found in Iran. It is part of the large-scaled Capoeta capoeta clade or complex of species in the genus Capoeta.

It grows up to 35 cm (14 in) standard length.
