= Onychostoma breve =

Scientific classification
- Domain: Eukaryota
- Kingdom: Animalia
- Phylum: Chordata
- Class: Actinopterygii
- Order: Cypriniformes
- Family: Cyprinidae
- Genus: Onychostoma
- Species: O. breve

Binomial name
- Onychostoma breve (Wu & Chen, 1977)

Species of fish

Onychostoma breve is a species of cyprinid in the genus Onychostoma. It inhabits the Yangtze in China and has a maximum length of 14.6 centimetres (5.7 in).
