= Altigena elegans =

Conservation status
- Near Threatened (IUCN 3.1)

Scientific classification
- Kingdom: Animalia
- Phylum: Chordata
- Class: Actinopterygii
- Order: Cypriniformes
- Family: Cyprinidae
- Genus: Altigena
- Species: A. elegans

Binomial name
- Altigena elegans Kottelat, 1998

Synonyms
- Bangana elegans

Species of fish

Altigena elegans is a species of fish in the family Cyprinidae. It is found in the Nam Theun basin in Laos.
