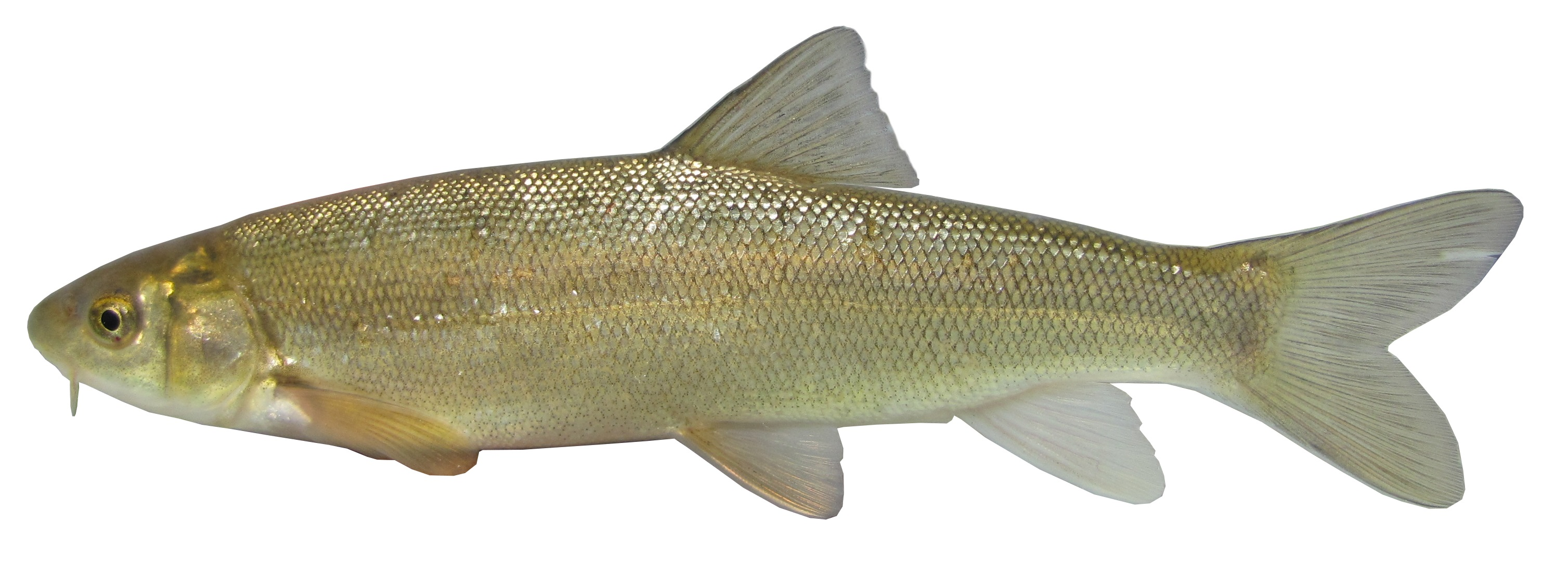
- Capoeta buhsei

Scientific classification
- Kingdom: Animalia
- Phylum: Chordata
- Class: Actinopterygii
- Division: Teleostei
- Order: Cypriniformes
- Family: Cyprinidae
- Subfamily: Barbinae
- Genus: Capoeta; Valenciennes, 1842

Type species
- Cyprinus capoeta Güldenstädt, 1773

Synonyms
- Scaphiodon Heckel, 1843

= Capoeta =

Genus of fishes

Capoeta, also known as scrapers, is a genus of fish in the family Cyprinidae found in Western Asia. The distribution extends from Turkey to the Levant, to Transcaucasia, Iraq, Turkmenistan, in Armenia, particularly in lake Sevan and northern Afghanistan. This genus is most closely related to Luciobarbus and in itself is divided into three morphologically, biogeographically and genetically distinct groups or clades: the Mesopotamian clade, the Anatolian-Iranian clade and the Aralo-Caspian clade. The Mesopotamian clade was split off to Paracapoeta in 2022.

== Species ==
These are the currently recognized species in this genus:

- Capoeta aculeata (Valenciennes, 1844)
- Capoeta alborzensis Jouladeh-Roudbar, Eagderi, Ghanavi & Doadrio, 2016
- Capoeta antalyensis (Hankó (hu), 1925)
- Capoeta aydinensis Turan, Küçük, Kaya, Güçlü & Bektaş 2017
- Capoeta banarescui Turan, Kottelat, Ekmekçi & İmamoğlu, 2006
- Capoeta bergamae M. S. Karaman (sr), 1969 (Aegean scraper)
- Capoeta birunii Zareian & Esmaeili, 2017
- Capoeta buhsei Kessler, 1877 (Namak scraper)
- Capoeta caelestis Schöter, Özuluğ & Freyhof, 2009 (Taurus scraper)
- Capoeta capoeta (Güldenstädt, 1773) (Caucasian scraper)
- Capoeta coadi Alwan, Zareian & Esmaeili, 2016
- Capoeta damascina (Valenciennes, 1842) (Levantine scraper, Mesopotamian barb)
- Capoeta ferdowsii Jouladeh-Roudbar, Eagderi, Murillo-Ramos, Ghanavi & Doadrio, 2017
- Capoeta fusca A. M. Nikolskii, 1897
- Capoeta gracilis (Keyserling, 1861)
- Capoeta heratensis (Keyserling, 1861)
- Capoeta kaput Levin, Prokofiev & Roubenyan, 2019
- Capoeta macrolepis (Heckel 1847)
- Capoeta oguzelii Elp, Osmanoğlu, Kadak & Turan 2018
- Capoeta pestai (Pietschmann, 1933) (Eğirdir longsnout scraper, Eğirdir barb)
- Capoeta pyragyi Jouladeh-Roudbar, Eagderi, Murillo-Ramos, Ghanavi & Doadrio 2017
- Capoeta raghazensis Eagderi & Mousavi-Sabet, 2021
- Capoeta razii Jouladeh-Roudbar, Eagderi, Ghanavi & Doadrio, 2017
- Capoeta saadii (Heckel, 1847)
- Capoeta sevangi De Filippi, 1865
- Capoeta shajariani Jouladeh-Roudbar, Eagderi, Murillo-Ramos, Ghanavi & Doadrio 2017
- Capoeta sieboldii (Steindachner, 1864) (nipple-lip scraper)
- Capoeta svanetica Roman, Afanasyev, Golub & Lietytska, 2022
- Capoeta tinca (Heckel, 1843) (western fourbarbel scraper, Anatolian khramulya)
- Capoeta umbla (Heckel, 1843) (Tigris scraper)
