= Onychostoma fusiforme =

Conservation status
- Least Concern (IUCN 3.1)

Scientific classification
- Kingdom: Animalia
- Phylum: Chordata
- Class: Actinopterygii
- Order: Cypriniformes
- Family: Cyprinidae
- Genus: Onychostoma
- Species: O. fusiforme

Binomial name
- Onychostoma fusiforme Kottelat, 1998

Species of fish

Onychostoma fusiforme is a species of cyprinid in the genus Onychostoma. It inhabits inland wetlands in Asia and has a maximum length of 23.0 centimetres (9.1 in). It is used for food locally.
