= Capoeta bergamae =

Conservation status
- Near Threatened (IUCN 3.1)

Scientific classification
- Kingdom: Animalia
- Phylum: Chordata
- Class: Actinopterygii
- Order: Cypriniformes
- Family: Cyprinidae
- Subfamily: Barbinae
- Genus: Capoeta
- Species: C. bergamae

Binomial name
- Capoeta bergamae M. S. Karaman, 1969

Synonyms
- Capoeta capoeta bergamae Karaman, 1969

Species of fish

Capoeta bergamae is a species of freshwater cyprinid fish native to Turkey. The species is also known as the Aegean scraper.

It is widespread in western Anatolia and lives in rivers ranging from the Bakacak river on the Biga Peninsula south to the Dalaman River. It is threatened by the massive pollution of rivers and streams and water abstraction, leading to habitat loss. The fish is up to 20 cm long. It is occasionally eaten, but is not widely commercialized.
