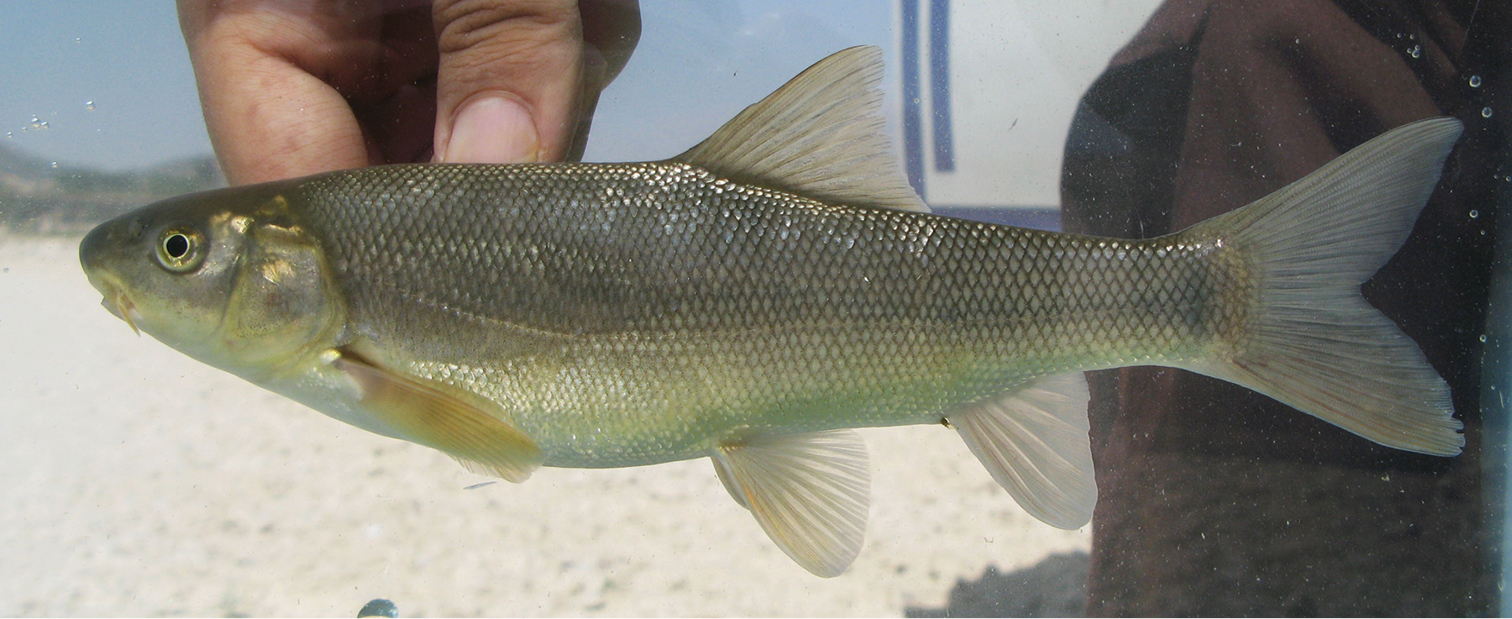

Scientific classification
- Kingdom: Animalia
- Phylum: Chordata
- Class: Actinopterygii
- Order: Cypriniformes
- Family: Cyprinidae
- Subfamily: Barbinae
- Genus: Capoeta
- Species: C. coadi

Binomial name
- Capoeta coadi Alwan, Zareian, & Esmaeili, 2016

= Capoeta coadi =

Species of fish

Capoeta coadi is a cyprinid fish endemic to the Karun River drainage in Iran. It can be identified by its silver and metallic scales.
