= Altigena yunnanensis =

Conservation status
- Data Deficient (IUCN 3.1)

Scientific classification
- Kingdom: Animalia
- Phylum: Chordata
- Class: Actinopterygii
- Order: Cypriniformes
- Family: Cyprinidae
- Subfamily: Labeoninae
- Genus: Altigena
- Species: A. yunnanensis

Binomial name
- Altigena yunnanensis (H. W. Wu & R. D. Lin, Chen, Chen & He, 1977)

Synonyms
- Bangana yunnanensis; Mirolabeo yunnanensis; Sinilabeo yunnanensis

Species of fish

Altigena yunnanensis is a species of cyprinid fish endemic to Yunnan province in China.
