= Onychostoma laticeps =

Scientific classification
- Domain: Eukaryota
- Kingdom: Animalia
- Phylum: Chordata
- Class: Actinopterygii
- Order: Cypriniformes
- Family: Cyprinidae
- Genus: Onychostoma
- Species: O. laticeps

Binomial name
- Onychostoma laticeps Günther, 1896

Species of fish

Onychostoma laticeps is a species of cyprinid in the genus Onychostoma. It inhabits China and Vietnam.
