= Onychostoma brevibarba =

Scientific classification
- Kingdom: Animalia
- Phylum: Chordata
- Class: Actinopterygii
- Order: Cypriniformes
- Family: Cyprinidae
- Genus: Onychostoma
- Species: O. brevibarba

Binomial name
- Onychostoma brevibarba X.-L. Song, L. Cao & E. Zhang, 2018

Species of fish

Onychostoma brevibarba is a species of freshwater ray-finned fish belonging to the family Cyprinidae, which includes the carps. minnows and allied fishes. This species is found in the Xiang Jiang drainage in the Chang Jiang basin of Hunan Province in China.
