= Capoeta sevangi =

Scientific classification
- Domain: Eukaryota
- Kingdom: Animalia
- Phylum: Chordata
- Class: Actinopterygii
- Order: Cypriniformes
- Family: Cyprinidae
- Subfamily: Barbinae
- Genus: Capoeta
- Species: C. sevangi

Binomial name
- Capoeta sevangi (De Filippi, 1865)

Synonyms
- Capoeta capoeta sevangi; Varicorhinus capoeta sevangi

Species of fish

Capoeta sevangi is a cyprinid fish endemic to Lake Sevan in Armenia. Some taxonomic authorities classify it as a subspecies of Capoeta capoeta.

It previously dominated in the fish landings, along with the Sevan trout. Annual harvest could be 300-500 tonnes.

Males reach maturity at 2–3 years and females in 5–7 years in females. They spawn in the lake in June–July, but there are also populations in the major rivers draining to the lake. The fish feed on detritus and as adults also on aquatic vegetation.

Since 1936, with the gradual deterioration of reproduction conditions due to the permanent exposure of many spawning grounds, and with many spawning grounds in rivers lost, khramulya stocks in Sevan have gradually declined, then sharply decreased.
