= Capoeta banarescui =

Conservation status
- Least Concern (IUCN 3.1)

Scientific classification
- Kingdom: Animalia
- Phylum: Chordata
- Class: Actinopterygii
- Order: Cypriniformes
- Family: Cyprinidae
- Subfamily: Barbinae
- Genus: Capoeta
- Species: C. banarescui

Binomial name
- Capoeta banarescui Turan, Kottelat, Ekmekçi & İmamoğlu, 2006

Species of fish

Capoeta banarescui. the Colchic scraper or Banarescu's barb, is a species of cyprinid fish known from Turkey. It inhabits swiftly flowing water with cobbles and pebbles bottom.

It is only known from northeast Turkey from the Çoruh River system, which drains through Georgia to the Black Sea. It was distinguished from Capoeta tinca (the Anatolian khramulya) as an independent species in 2006.
