= Labeobarbus fimbriatus =

Scientific classification
- Kingdom: Animalia
- Phylum: Chordata
- Class: Actinopterygii
- Order: Cypriniformes
- Family: Cyprinidae
- Subfamily: Torinae
- Genus: Labeobarbus
- Species: L. fimbriatus

Binomial name
- Labeobarbus fimbriatus (Holly, 1926)

Synonyms
- Varicorhinus fimbriatus

Species of fish

Labeobarbus fimbriatus is a species of ray-finned fish in the family Cyprinidae. It is endemic to the Sanaga River system in Cameroon.
