= Onychostoma simum =

Conservation status
- Data Deficient (IUCN 3.1)

Scientific classification
- Kingdom: Animalia
- Phylum: Chordata
- Class: Actinopterygii
- Order: Cypriniformes
- Family: Cyprinidae
- Genus: Onychostoma
- Species: O. simum

Binomial name
- Onychostoma simum (Sauvage, Dabry de Thiersant, 1874)

Synonyms
- Barbus simus Sauvage & Dabry de Thiersant, 1874; Varicorhinus simus (Sauvage & Dabry de Thiersant, 1874)

Species of fish

Onychostoma simum is a species of cyprinid in the genus Onychostoma. It inhabits China and Vietnam. It has a maximum length of 34.5 centimetres (13.6 in) and a common length of 24.0 centimetres (9.4 in).
