= Scaphiodonichthys acanthopterus =

Conservation status
- Least Concern (IUCN 3.1)

Scientific classification
- Kingdom: Animalia
- Phylum: Chordata
- Class: Actinopterygii
- Division: Teleostei
- Order: Cypriniformes
- Family: Cyprinidae
- Genus: Scaphiodonichthys
- Species: S. acanthopterus

Binomial name
- Scaphiodonichthys acanthopterus (Fowler, 1934)

Synonyms
- Scaphiodontopsis acanthopterus Fowler, 1934; Varicorhinus acanthopterus (Fowler, 1934); Onychostoma microcorpus Nguyen & Doan, 1969; Scaphiodonichthys microcorpus (Nguyen & Doan, 1969)

Species of fish

Scaphiodonichthys acanthopterus is a freshwater fish of the family Cyprinidae (carps and minnows). It is found in clear, fast-moving streams and tributaries of the Mekong, Nam Xam, Da and Chao Phraya river basins in Indochina. S. acanthopterus is most commonly found in waterways with a rocky bottom and under complete tree cover.

== Taxonomy ==
The original description of this fish is attributed to Fowler in 1934, although he originally assigned the name Scaphiodontopsis acanthopterus. The genus name of Scaphiodonichtys is from the Greek skaphe (boat), odous (teeth), ichthys (fish).

== Distribution, habitat & ecology ==
S. acanthopterus is found in the South-East Asian countries of Cambodia, Laos, Thailand, and Vietnam as well in Yunnan, China. It inhabits several river basins, including the Mekong, Chao Phraya, Nam Theun, and Xe Bangfai, mostly living in smaller tributaries and streams with clear, fast moving water, and a rocky bottom. This fish has been documented between 300 and 2500 meters above sea level (980 to 8200 feet). It is normally found in streams under the shade of a complete forest canopy.

S. acanthopterus feeds largely on periphyton on rocky surfaces but also on insect larvae and a small amount of detritus. It seems to breed immediately following the end of the rainy season as the water levels in the upland areas have fallen with juveniles appearing in catches during April.

== Human interactions ==
S. acanthopterus is consumed locally and is seasonally recorded in small local markets. It is potentially threatened by deforestation, pollution and overfishing but the population appears to be stable and it is common in some protected areas.
