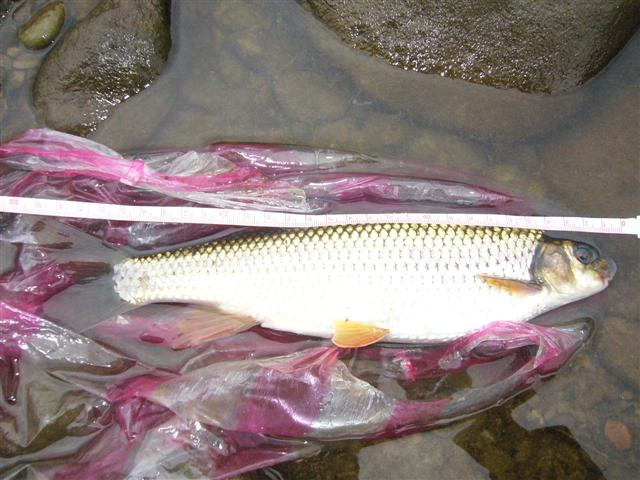

Scientific classification
- Domain: Eukaryota
- Kingdom: Animalia
- Phylum: Chordata
- Class: Actinopterygii
- Order: Cypriniformes
- Family: Cyprinidae
- Genus: Onychostoma
- Species: O. barbatum

Binomial name
- Onychostoma barbatum (Lin, 1931)

= Onychostoma barbatum =

Species of fish

Onychostoma barbatum is a species of cyprinid in the genus Onychostoma that inhabits inland wetlands in Guangxi, Guangdong and Hunan, China. It is used for food locally a maximum length of 17.6 centimetres (6.9 in).
