= Acrossocheilus monticola =

Scientific classification
- Domain: Eukaryota
- Kingdom: Animalia
- Phylum: Chordata
- Class: Actinopterygii
- Order: Cypriniformes
- Family: Cyprinidae
- Subfamily: Acrossocheilinae
- Genus: Acrossocheilus
- Species: A. monticola

Binomial name
- Acrossocheilus monticola (Günther, 1888)

Synonyms
- Crossochilus monticola Günther, 1888; Crossocheilus monticola (Günther, 1888)

Species of fish

Acrossocheilus monticola is a species of ray-finned fish in the genus Acrossocheilus.
