= Decorus tungting =

Conservation status
- Vulnerable (IUCN 3.1)

Scientific classification
- Kingdom: Animalia
- Phylum: Chordata
- Class: Actinopterygii
- Order: Cypriniformes
- Family: Cyprinidae
- Subfamily: Labeoninae
- Genus: Decorus
- Species: D. tungting

Binomial name
- Decorus tungting (Nichols, 1925)

Synonyms
- Varicorhinus tungting Nichols, 1925; Bangana tungting (Nichols, 1925); Sinilabeo decorus tungting (Nichols, 1925); Sinilabeo tungting (Nichols, 1925)

Species of fish

Decorus tungting is a species of freshwater ray-finned fish belonging to the family Cyprinidae, the carps, barbs, minnows and related fishes. This species is endemic to China where it was formerly widespread in the Dongting Hu and its drainage basin, its range has contracted and in the 15 years up to 2023 it was only recorded from the main stream of the Yuan Jiang, in Huaihua, Hunan and Xinshao, and in the main stream of the Zhi Shu, a feeder stream of Dongting Hu.
