= Altigena discognathoides =

Scientific classification
- Domain: Eukaryota
- Kingdom: Animalia
- Phylum: Chordata
- Class: Actinopterygii
- Order: Cypriniformes
- Family: Cyprinidae
- Subfamily: Labeoninae
- Genus: Altigena
- Species: A. discognathoides

Binomial name
- Altigena discognathoides (Nichols & Pope, 1927)

Synonyms
- Bangana discognathoides; Sinilabeo discognathoides; Varicorhinus discognathoides; Varicorhinus pogonifer

Species of fish

Altigena discognathoides is a species of cyprinid fish endemic to China.
