= Onychostoma lepturus =

Conservation status
- Data Deficient (IUCN 3.1)

Scientific classification
- Kingdom: Animalia
- Phylum: Chordata
- Class: Actinopterygii
- Order: Cypriniformes
- Family: Cyprinidae
- Genus: Onychostoma
- Species: O. lepturus

Binomial name
- Onychostoma lepturus (Boulenger, 1900)

Synonyms
- Barbus roulei Wu, 1931; Gymnostomus lepturus Boulenger, 1900; Onychostoma leptura Boulenger, 1900; Onychostoma lepturum Boulenger, 1900; Varicorhinus argentatus Nguyen & Doan, 1969; Varicorhinus erythrogenys Nguyen & Doan, 1969

Species of fish

Onychostoma lepturus, commonly known as thintail shoveljaw carp, is a species of cyprinid in the genus Onychostoma. It inhabits China, Laos and Vietnam and has a maximum length of 23.8 centimetres (9.4 in).
