= Decorus lemassoni =

Conservation status
- Data Deficient (IUCN 3.1)

Scientific classification
- Kingdom: Animalia
- Phylum: Chordata
- Class: Actinopterygii
- Order: Cypriniformes
- Family: Cyprinidae
- Subfamily: Labeoninae
- Genus: Decorus
- Species: D. lemassoni

Binomial name
- Decorus lemassoni (Pellegrin & Chevey, 1936)

Synonyms
- Altigena bibarbata Mai, 1978; Altigena lemassoni (Pellegrin & Chevey, 1936); Altigena lemassonni (Pellegrin & Chevey, 1936) (lapsus); Bangana lemassoni (Pellegrin & Chevey, 1936); Sinilabeo lemassoni (Pellegrin & Chevey, 1936); Sinilabeo rendahli lemassoni (Pellegrin & Chevey, 1936); Varicorhinus lemassoni Pellegrin & Chevey, 1936

Species of fish

Decorus lemassoni is a species of cyprinid fish found in the Ma River basin in Laos, the Red River basin in Vietnam, and Yunnan province in China.

== Etymology ==
The fish is named in honor of aquatic engineer Jean L. Lemasson, the Chief of the Fishing and Hunting Service in Hanoi, Vietnam, who collected the holotype specimen.
