= Decorus decorus =

Conservation status
- Critically Endangered (IUCN 3.1)

Scientific classification
- Kingdom: Animalia
- Phylum: Chordata
- Class: Actinopterygii
- Order: Cypriniformes
- Family: Cyprinidae
- Subfamily: Labeoninae
- Genus: Decorus
- Species: D. decorus

Binomial name
- Decorus decorus (Peters, 1881)

Synonyms
- Labeo decorus Peters, 1881; Bangana decora (Peters, 1881); Sinilabeo decorus (Peters, 1881); Sinilabeo decorus decorus (Peters, 1881); Varicorhinus brevis S. Y. Lin, 1931

Species of fish

Decorus decorus is a species of freshwater ray-finned fish belonging to the family Cyprinidae, the carps, barbs, minnows and related fishes. This fish is endemic to China, where it has been recorded from the Xiyang Jiang, a tributary of the Xi Jiang, in Yunnan and the Bei Jiang in Guangdong and Guangxi Provinces. It is found in mountain streams with gravel beds and a fast current.
