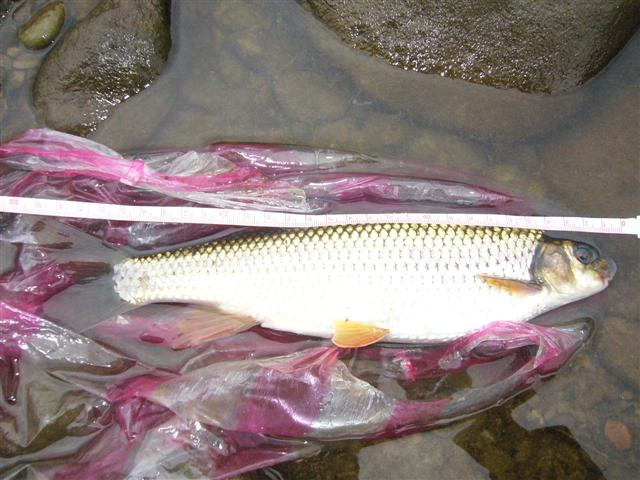

Conservation status
- Data Deficient (IUCN 3.1)

Scientific classification
- Domain: Eukaryota
- Kingdom: Animalia
- Phylum: Chordata
- Class: Actinopterygii
- Order: Cypriniformes
- Family: Cyprinidae
- Genus: Onychostoma
- Species: O. barbatulum

Binomial name
- Onychostoma barbatulum (Pellegrin, 1908)

Synonyms
- Gymnostomus barbatulus Pellegrin, 1908; Varicorhinus barbatulus (Pellegrin, 1908)

= Onychostoma barbatulum =

Species of fish

Onychostoma barbatulum (common name: Taiwan shovel-jaw carp) is a species of ray-finned fish in the family Cyprinidae. It can grow to 19 cm (7.5 in) SL, but commonly only to about half of that.

Onychostoma barbatulum is found in Taiwan and in the Pearl River Basin of southern China. It is a herbivorous species that occurs in fast-flowing sections of rivers. Its populations may be dramatically impacted by typhoon-related disturbance, in one documented case nearly extirpating a local population.
