= Rwandese carp =

Conservation status
- Critically Endangered (IUCN 3.1)

Scientific classification
- Kingdom: Animalia
- Phylum: Chordata
- Class: Actinopterygii
- Order: Cypriniformes
- Family: Cyprinidae
- Subfamily: Torinae
- Genus: Labeobarbus
- Species: L. platystomus

Binomial name
- Labeobarbus platystomus Pappenheim in Pappenheim & Boulenger, 1914

Synonyms
- Varicorhinus platystomus (Pappenheim & Boulenger, 1914)

Species of fish

The Rwandese carp (Labeobarbus platystomus), is a species of ray-finned fish in the family Cyprinidae. It is found only in Rwanda. Its natural habitat is fast flowing rivers. It is threatened by increased turbidity of the water due to the expansion of agriculture and deforestation in the land the rivers it occurs in drain. Pollution from that agriculture and introduced species also threatened the Rwandese carp.
