= Capoeta saadii =

Conservation status
- Least Concern (IUCN 3.1)

Scientific classification
- Kingdom: Animalia
- Phylum: Chordata
- Class: Actinopterygii
- Division: Teleostei
- Order: Cypriniformes
- Family: Cyprinidae
- Subfamily: Barbinae
- Genus: Capoeta
- Species: C. saadii

Binomial name
- Capoeta saadii (Heckel, 1847)

Synonyms
- Scaphiodon saadii

Species of fish

Capoeta saadii is a cyprinid fish endemic to Iran. It is named after Persian poet Saadi.
