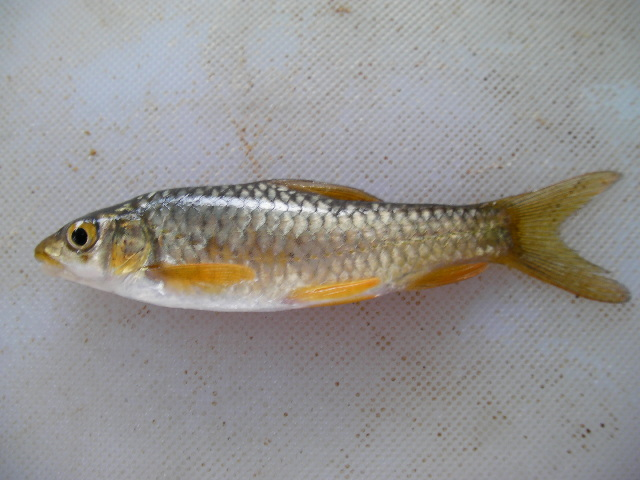

Conservation status
- Least Concern (IUCN 3.1)

Scientific classification
- Kingdom: Animalia
- Phylum: Chordata
- Class: Actinopterygii
- Order: Cypriniformes
- Family: Cyprinidae
- Subfamily: Torinae
- Genus: Labeobarbus
- Species: L. marequensis

Binomial name
- Labeobarbus marequensis (A. Smith, 1841)

Synonyms
- Barbus marequensis Smith, 1841; Barbus inermis Peters, 1852; Labeobarbus zambezensis Peters, 1852; Barbus zambezensis (Peters, 1852); Barbus rhodesianus Boulenger, 1902; Barbus brucii Boulenger, 1907; Barbus sector Boulenger, 1907; Varicorhinus brucii Boulenger, 1907; Barbus victoriae Boulenger, 1908; Barbus fairbairnii Boulenger, 1908; Varicorhinus nasutus Gilchrist & Thompson, 1911; Barbus nasutus (Gilchrist & Thompson, 1911); Barbus cookei Gilchrist & Thompson, 1913; Barbus dwaarsensis Gilchrist & Thompson, 1913; Barbus gunningi Gilchrist & Thompson, 1913; Barbus sabiensis Gilchrist & Thompson, 1913; Barbus swierstrae Gilchrist & Thompson, 1913

= Largescale yellowfish =

Species of fish

The largescale yellowfish or Lowveld largescale yellowfish (Labeobarbus marequensis) is a species of fish in the family Cyprinidae. An African freshwater fish found from the Zambezi south to the Pongola River.
