= Labeobarbus johnstonii =

Conservation status
- Least Concern (IUCN 3.1)

Scientific classification
- Kingdom: Animalia
- Phylum: Chordata
- Class: Actinopterygii
- Order: Cypriniformes
- Family: Cyprinidae
- Subfamily: Torinae
- Genus: Labeobarbus
- Species: L. johnstonii

Binomial name
- Labeobarbus johnstonii (Boulenger, 1907)

Synonyms
- Barbus johnstonii Boulenger, 1907; Barbus eurystomus Keilhack, 1908; Labeobarbus brevicauda (Keilhack, 1908); Barbus njassae Keilhack, 1908; Barbus globiceps Worthington, 1933; Varicorhinus nyasensis Worthington, 1933

Species of fish

Labeobarbus johnstonii is a species of cyprinid fish. It has long been placed in Barbus, the "wastebin genus" for barbs, by default, and this is still being done by the IUCN. However, the species is increasingly being restored to related yellowfish genus Labeobarbus which seems a much more appropriate placement. It is presumably hexaploid like the other yellowfish. The supposed subspecies latirostris of its relative L. intermedius is actually misidentified L. johnstonii.

Its natural habitats are rivers and freshwater lakes. It is found in Lake Malawi, the Shire River and their larger tributaries in Malawi, Mozambique and Tanzania.

Like other yellowfish, L. johnstonii is a large species. It can grow to more than 30 cm (12 in) standard length and over 4 kilograms (8.8 lb) in weight. This freshwater fish is found in small group in all sorts of underwater habitat. They are omnivores, but adult fish like to eat smaller fishes in particular. For spawning, they migrate towards the rivers' headwaters in the rainy season. The lake populations often do not return from their spawning grounds until the dry season has started.

This species is of commercial significance. It is collected and traded for aquaria, typically when young, but this is only a fish for the largest of tanks if it shall thrive. The spawning adults are fished for local food and for trade. Although L. johnstonii is widespread and not considered a threatened species by the IUCN, catching the fishes when they migrate to spawn and not when they return as well as the use of fish poisons (which is illegal but still practiced in places) is probably depleting its numbers faster than they can recover.
