= Onychostoma lini =

Conservation status
- Data Deficient (IUCN 3.1)

Scientific classification
- Kingdom: Animalia
- Phylum: Chordata
- Class: Actinopterygii
- Order: Cypriniformes
- Family: Cyprinidae
- Genus: Onychostoma
- Species: O. lini

Binomial name
- Onychostoma lini (H. W. Wu, 1939)

Species of fish

Onychostoma lini is a species of cyprinid in the genus Onychostoma. It inhabits China and Hong Kong and has a maximum length of 25.3 centimetres (10.0 in).
