= Labeobarbus pellegrini =

Scientific classification
- Kingdom: Animalia
- Phylum: Chordata
- Class: Actinopterygii
- Order: Cypriniformes
- Family: Cyprinidae
- Subfamily: Torinae
- Genus: Labeobarbus
- Species: L. pellegrini

Binomial name
- Labeobarbus pellegrini (Bertin & Estève, 1948)

Synonyms
- Varicorhinus babaulti; Varicorhinus pellegrini

Species of fish

Labeobarbus pellegrini is a species of ray-finned fish in the genus Labeobarbus is endemic to the Lowa River in the Democratic Republic of the Congo.
