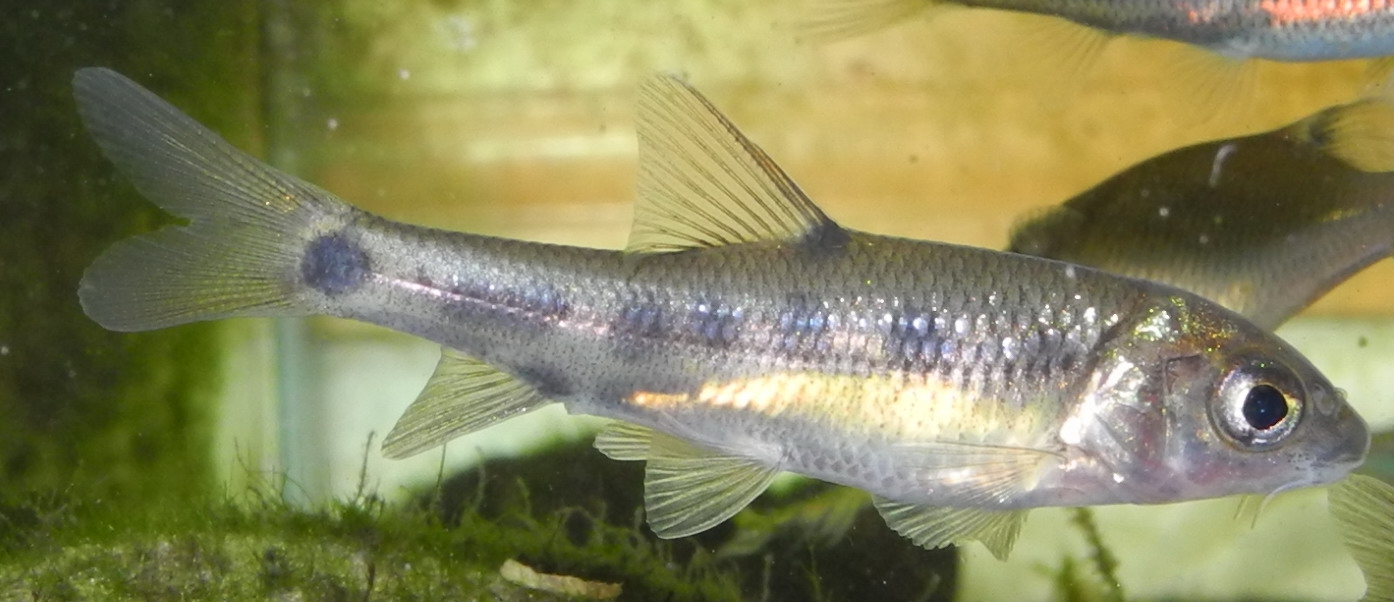

Conservation status
- Least Concern (IUCN 3.1)

Scientific classification
- Kingdom: Animalia
- Phylum: Chordata
- Class: Actinopterygii
- Order: Cypriniformes
- Family: Cyprinidae
- Subfamily: Acrossocheilinae
- Genus: Acrossocheilus
- Species: A. yunnanensis

Binomial name
- Acrossocheilus yunnanensis (Regan, 1904)

Synonyms
- Barbus yunnanensis Regan, 1904

= Acrossocheilus yunnanensis =

Species of fish

Acrossocheilus yunnanensis is a species of cyprinid fish. It occurs in eastern Yunnan province in China.
