= Capoeta sieboldii =

Conservation status
- Least Concern (IUCN 3.1)

Scientific classification
- Kingdom: Animalia
- Phylum: Chordata
- Class: Actinopterygii
- Order: Cypriniformes
- Family: Cyprinidae
- Subfamily: Barbinae
- Genus: Capoeta
- Species: C. sieboldii

Binomial name
- Capoeta sieboldii (Steindachner, 1864)

Synonyms
- Scaphiodon sieboldii Steindachner, 1864; Varicorhinus sieboldii (Steindachner, 1864)

Species of fish

Capoeta sieboldii, also called the nipple-lip scraper, is a cyprinid fish species from Turkey. It is widespread and lives in a range of habitats that are at least seasonally connected to rivers or streams. The distribution is from the Sakarya River eastwards, to western Transcaucasia.
