= Capoeta tinca =

Conservation status
- Least Concern (IUCN 3.1)

Scientific classification
- Kingdom: Animalia
- Phylum: Chordata
- Class: Actinopterygii
- Order: Cypriniformes
- Family: Cyprinidae
- Genus: Capoeta
- Species: C. tinca

Binomial name
- Capoeta tinca (Heckel, 1843)

Synonyms
- Scaphiodon tinca Heckel, 1843; Varicorhinus tinca (Heckel, 1843)

Species of fish

Capoeta tinca, or the Anatolian khramulya or western fourbarbel scraper, is a species of cyprinid fish endemic to Turkey, inhabiting swiftly flowing rivers.

It is known from rivers draining north to the Sea of Marmara. Earlier Capoeta tinca was thought to be more widespread across Turkey and Georgia, but in 2006 it was divided into three distinct species, Capoeta baliki, Capoeta banarescui and Capoeta tinca.
