= Onychostoma rarum =

Conservation status
- Data Deficient (IUCN 3.1)

Scientific classification
- Kingdom: Animalia
- Phylum: Chordata
- Class: Actinopterygii
- Division: Teleostei
- Order: Cypriniformes
- Family: Cyprinidae
- Genus: Onychostoma
- Species: O. rarum

Binomial name
- Onychostoma rarum (Lin, 1933)

Synonyms
- Varicorhinus rarus Lin, 1933; Onychostoma rara (Lin, 1933)

Species of fish

Onychostoma rarum is a species of cyprinid in the genus Onychostoma. It inhabits China and has a maximum length of 29.1 centimetres (11.5 in).
