= Onychostoma ovale =

Scientific classification
- Domain: Eukaryota
- Kingdom: Animalia
- Phylum: Chordata
- Class: Actinopterygii
- Order: Cypriniformes
- Family: Cyprinidae
- Genus: Onychostoma
- Species: O. ovale

Binomial name
- Onychostoma ovale Pellegrin & Chevey, 1936

Species of fish

Onychostoma ovale is a cyprinid in the genus Onychostoma. It inhabits China, Laos and Vietnam. It has a maximum length of 34.4 centimetres (13.5 in) and a maximum weight of 1.0 kilogram (2.2 lb).
