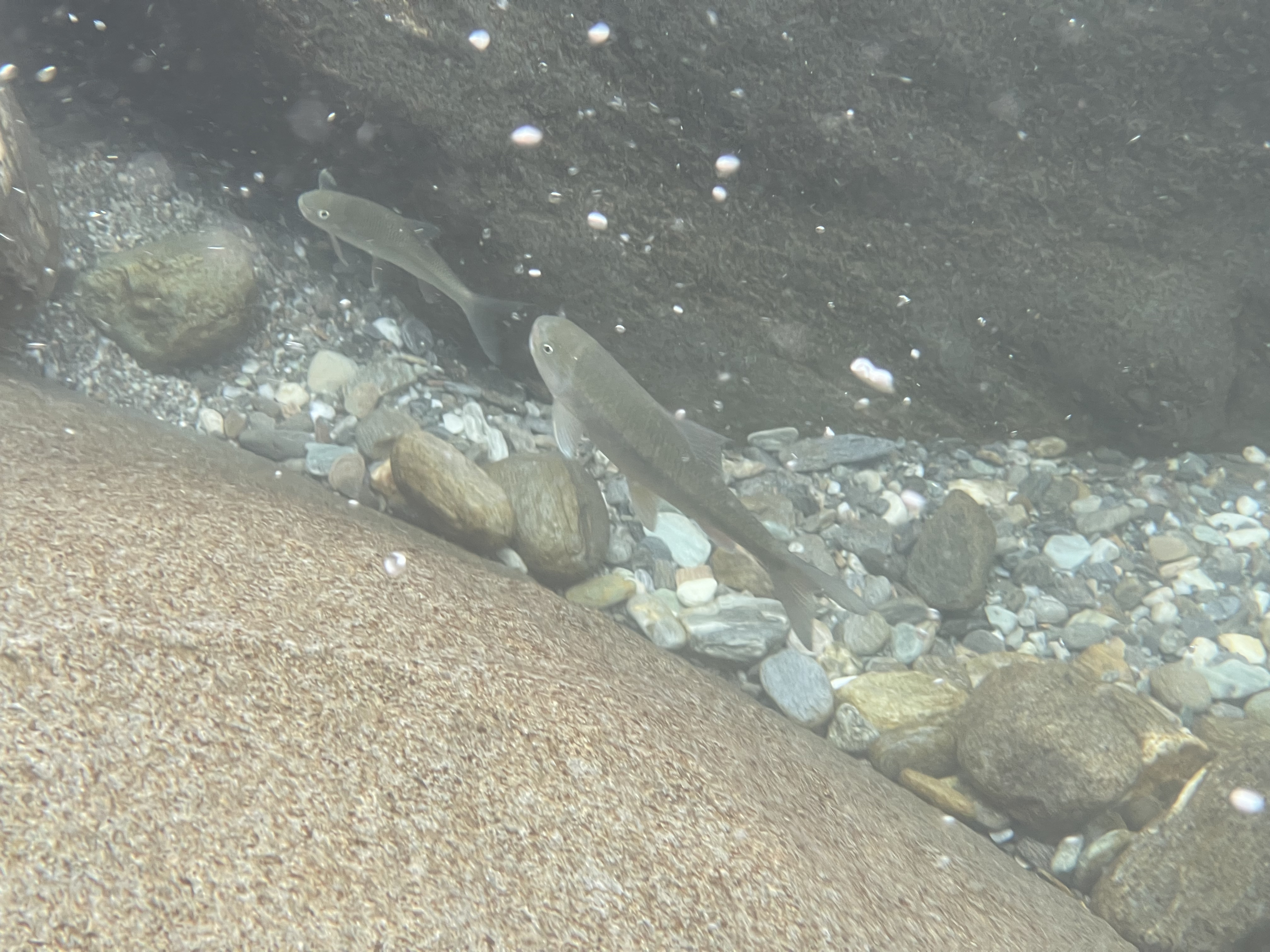

Conservation status
- Endangered (IUCN 2.3)

Scientific classification
- Kingdom: Animalia
- Phylum: Chordata
- Class: Actinopterygii
- Order: Cypriniformes
- Family: Cyprinidae
- Genus: Onychostoma
- Species: O. alticorpus

Binomial name
- Onychostoma alticorpus (Ōshima, 1920)

Synonyms
- Onychostoma alticorps (Oshima, 1920) [orth. error]

= Onychostoma alticorpus =

Species of fish

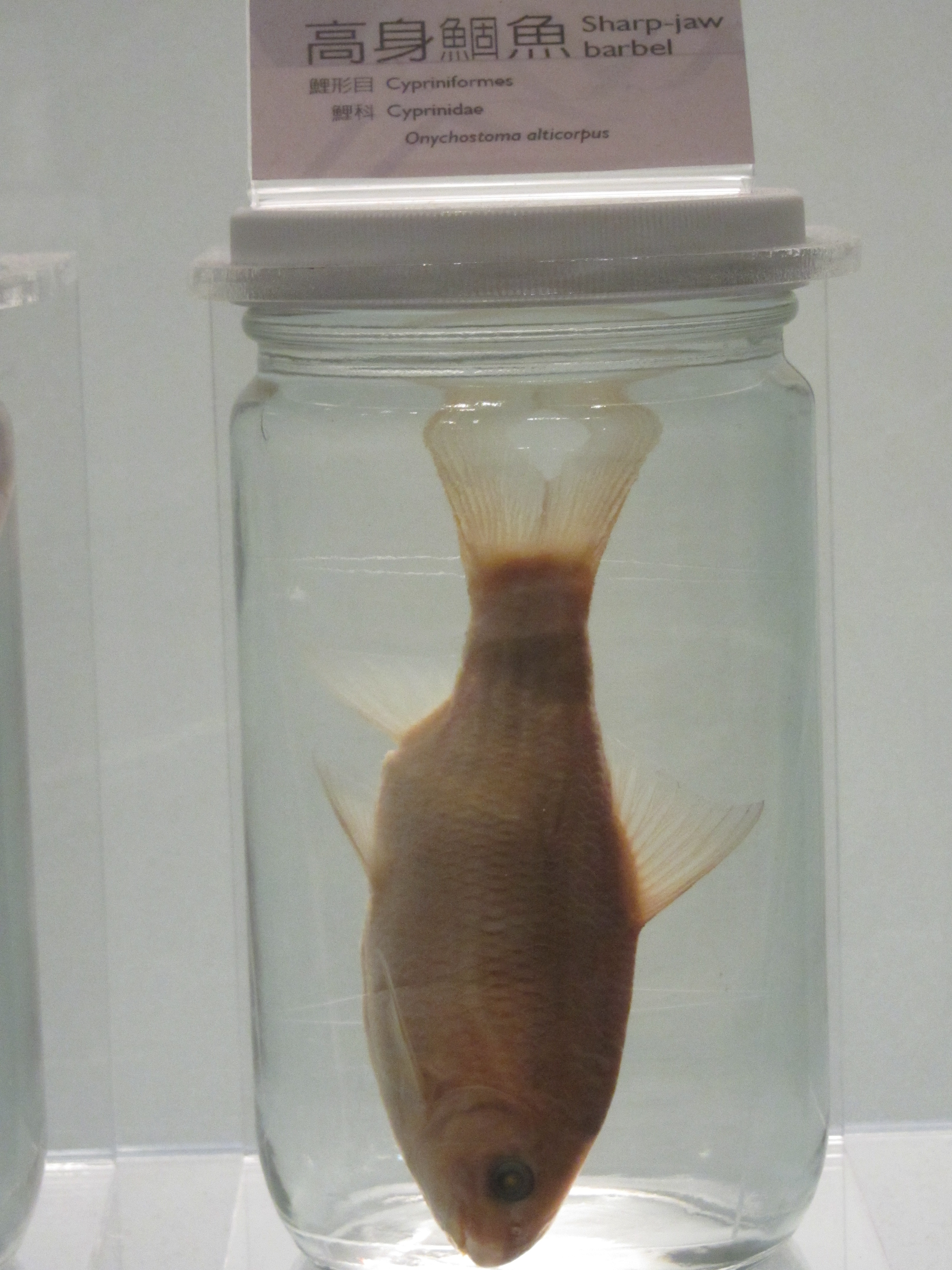

Onychostoma alticorpus (common name: Taiwan ku fish) is a species of ray-finned fish in the family Cyprinidae. It can grow to 50 cm (20 in) TL, but commonly only to about half of that.

Onychostoma alticorpus is endemic to Taiwan where it is known from only five river basins. It is a herbivorous species that occurs in streams. As with other riverine species, its habitat can be threatened by siltation, dam building, and pollution.
