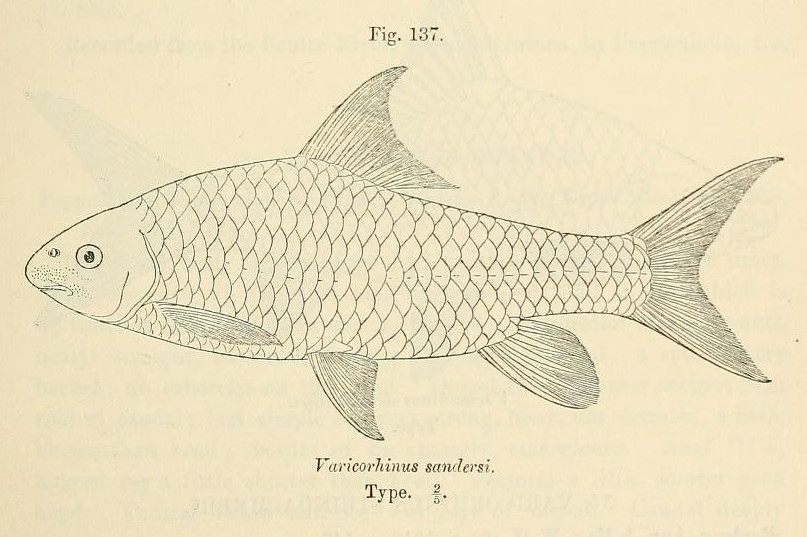

Scientific classification
- Domain: Eukaryota
- Kingdom: Animalia
- Phylum: Chordata
- Class: Actinopterygii
- Order: Cypriniformes
- Family: Cyprinidae
- Subfamily: Torinae
- Genus: Labeobarbus
- Species: L. sandersi

Binomial name
- Labeobarbus sandersi (Boulenger, 1912)

Synonyms
- Varicorhinus sandersi

= Labeobarbus sandersi =

Species of fish

Labeobarbus sandersi is a species of ray-finned fish in the genus Labeobarbus is found from southern Cameroon to the Chiloango River in Cabinda.
