= Scaphiodonichthys macracanthus =

Conservation status
- Data Deficient (IUCN 3.1)

Scientific classification
- Kingdom: Animalia
- Phylum: Chordata
- Class: Actinopterygii
- Order: Cypriniformes
- Family: Cyprinidae
- Genus: Scaphiodonichthys
- Species: S. macracanthus

Binomial name
- Scaphiodonichthys macracanthus (Pellegrin & Chevey, 1936)

Species of fish

Scaphiodonichthys macracanthus is a species of cyprinid fish of the genus Scaphiodonichthys. It inhabits inland wetlands in Yunnan, China and Vietnam. It has been assessed as "data deficient" on the IUCN Red List. It has a maximum length of around 21 cm (8.3 in). It is considered harmless to humans.
