= Onychostoma angustistomatum =

Conservation status
- Critically endangered, possibly extinct (IUCN 3.1)

Scientific classification
- Kingdom: Animalia
- Phylum: Chordata
- Class: Actinopterygii
- Order: Cypriniformes
- Family: Cyprinidae
- Genus: Onychostoma
- Species: O. angustistomatum

Binomial name
- Onychostoma angustistomatum (Fang, 1940)

Synonyms
- Onychostoma angustistomata

Species of fish

Onychostoma angustistomatum is a species of cyprinid in the genus Onychostoma. It inhabits China's Yangtze and has a maximum length of 18.9 centimetres (7.4 in).
