= Onychostoma gerlachi =

Conservation status
- Near Threatened (IUCN 3.1)

Scientific classification
- Kingdom: Animalia
- Phylum: Chordata
- Class: Actinopterygii
- Order: Cypriniformes
- Family: Cyprinidae
- Genus: Onychostoma
- Species: O. gerlachi

Binomial name
- Onychostoma gerlachi (Peters, 1881)

Synonyms
- Barbus gerlachi Peters, 1881; Varicorhinus babeensis Nguyen & Nguyen, 2001; Varicorhinus gerachi (Peters, 1881); Varicorhinus gerlachi (Peters, 1881); Varicorhinus thacbaensis Nguyen & Ngo, 2001; Varicorhinus yeni Nguyen & Ngo, 2001

Species of fish

Onychostoma gerlachi is a species of cyprinid in the genus Onychostoma. It inhabits inland wetlands in China, Laos, Thailand and Vietnam and is used for food locally. Its maximum length is 31.6 centimetres (12.4 in) and maximum weight 1.0 kilogram (2.2 lb). It is considered "near threatened" by the IUCN.
