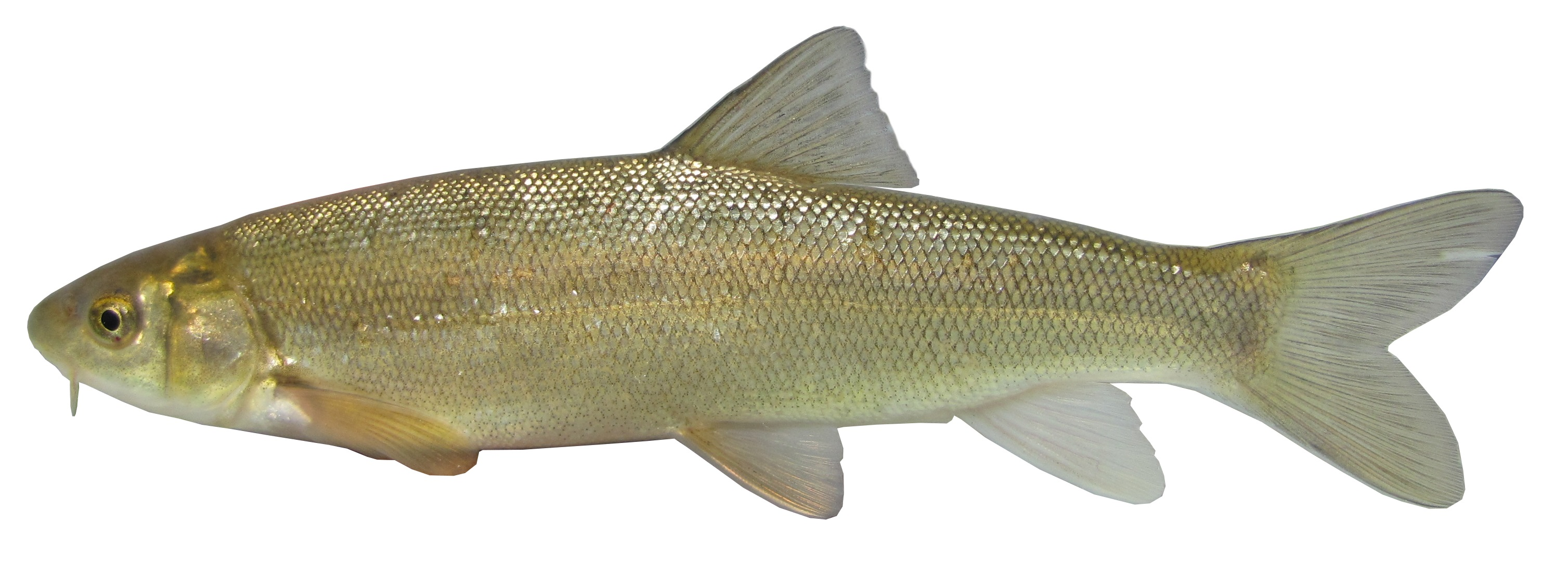

Conservation status
- Least Concern (IUCN 3.1)

Scientific classification
- Kingdom: Animalia
- Phylum: Chordata
- Class: Actinopterygii
- Order: Cypriniformes
- Family: Cyprinidae
- Subfamily: Barbinae
- Genus: Capoeta
- Species: C. buhsei

Binomial name
- Capoeta buhsei Kessler, 1877

Synonyms
- Varicorhinus nikolskii Derjavin, 1929

= Capoeta buhsei =

Species of fish

Capoeta buhsei, the Namak scraper, is a species of cyprinid fish from the Lake Namak basin, Iran. It is usually less than 10 cm long.
