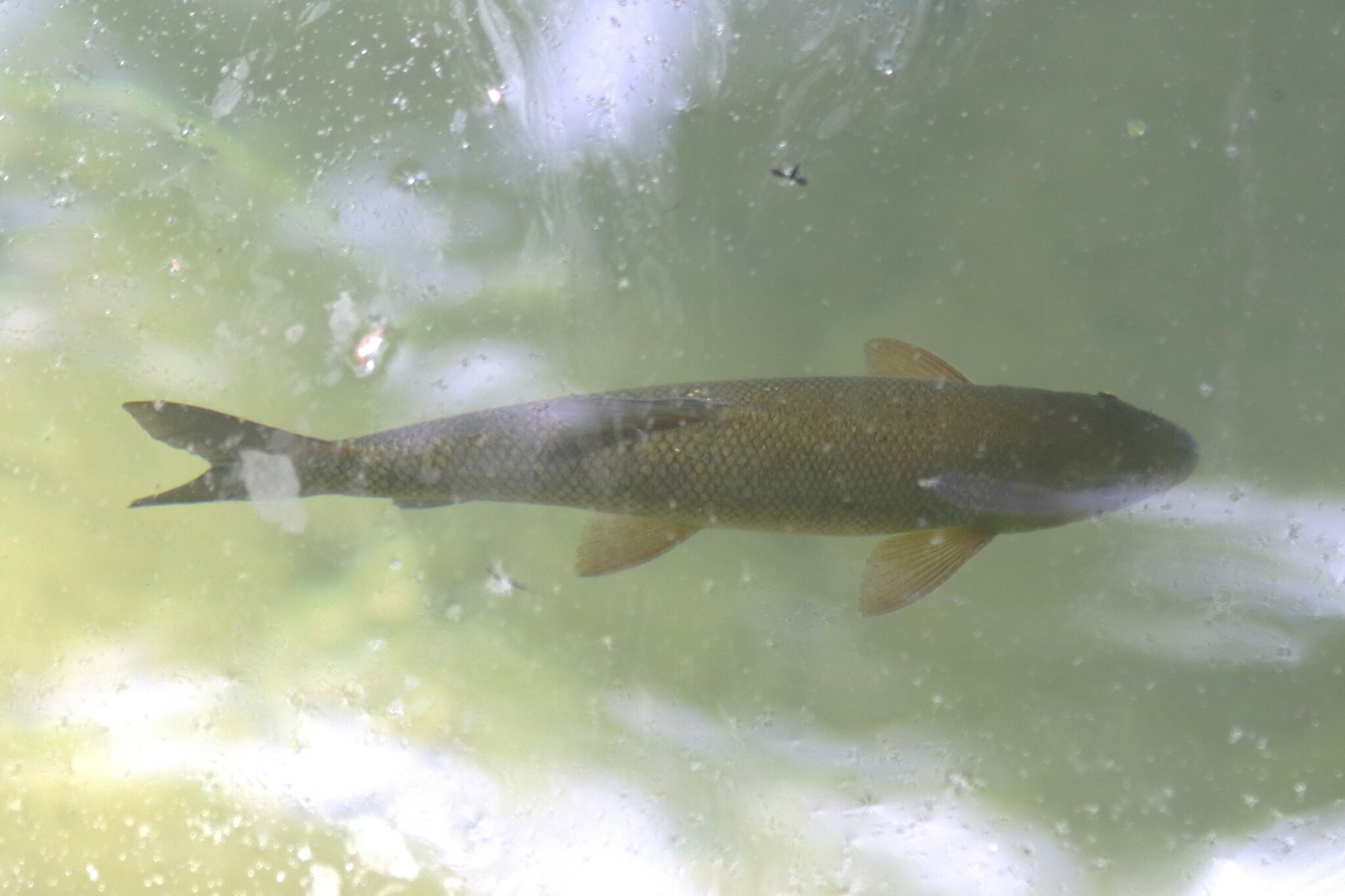
- Capoeta antalyensis

Conservation status
- Vulnerable (IUCN 3.1)

Scientific classification
- Kingdom: Animalia
- Phylum: Chordata
- Class: Actinopterygii
- Order: Cypriniformes
- Family: Cyprinidae
- Genus: Capoeta
- Species: C. antalyensis

Binomial name
- Capoeta antalyensis (Battalgil, 1943)

Synonyms
- Varicorhinus antalyensis Battalgil, 1943

= Capoeta antalyensis =

Species of fish

Capoeta antalyensis, also known as the Antalya barb or Pamphylian scraper, is a species of freshwater fish in the family Cyprinidae. It is found only in Turkey in the Aksu and Köprüçay River drainages, which flow south into the Gulf of Antalya in the Mediterranean. Its lives in swiftly flowing stretches of rivers, but also found in lakes. It is threatened by habitat loss.
