= Altigena tonkinensis =

Conservation status
- Near Threatened (IUCN 3.1)

Scientific classification
- Kingdom: Animalia
- Phylum: Chordata
- Class: Actinopterygii
- Order: Cypriniformes
- Family: Cyprinidae
- Subfamily: Labeoninae
- Genus: Altigena
- Species: A. tonkinensis

Binomial name
- Altigena tonkinensis (Pellegrin & Chevey, 1934)

Synonyms
- Bangana tonkinensis (Pellegrin & Chevey, 1934); Labeo graffeuili (Pellegrin & Chevey, 1936); Labeo tonkinensis (Pellegrin & Chevey, 1934); Sinilabeo tonkinensis (Pellegrin & Chevey, 1934); Varicorhinus graffeuili Pellegrin & Chevey, 1936; Varicorhinus tonkinensis Pellegrin & Chevey, 1934; Vinalabeo tonkinensis (Pellegrin & Chevey, 1934)

Species of fish

Altigena tonkinensis is a species of fish in the family Cyprinidae native to the Red River basin in China and Vietnam. This species was formerly the only member of the monospecific genus Vinalabeo.
