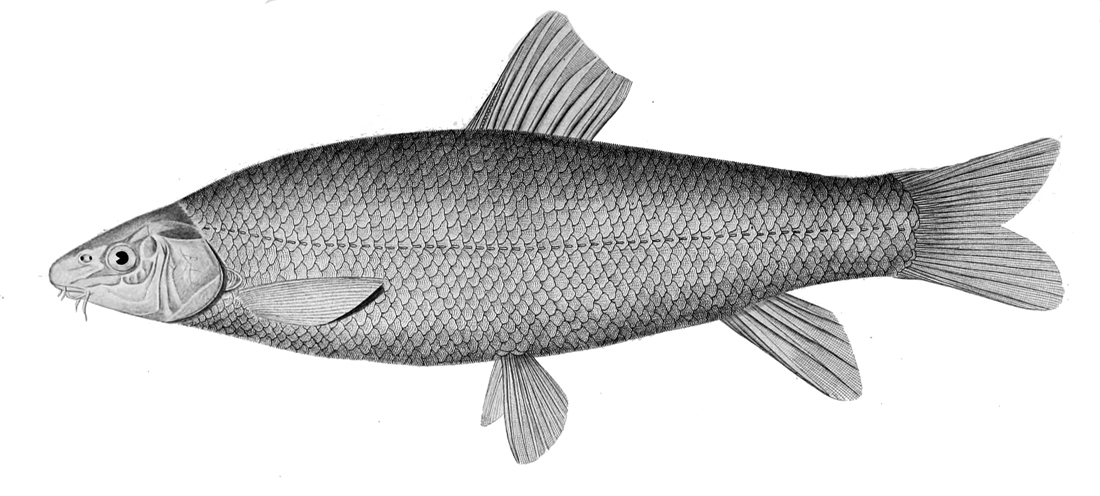

Conservation status
- Least Concern (IUCN 3.1)

Scientific classification
- Kingdom: Animalia
- Phylum: Chordata
- Class: Actinopterygii
- Order: Cypriniformes
- Family: Cyprinidae
- Subfamily: Barbinae
- Genus: Capoeta
- Species: C. capoeta

Binomial name
- Capoeta capoeta (Güldenstädt, 1773)

Synonyms
- Cyprinus capoeta Güldenstädt, 1773; Cyprinus fundulus Güldenstädt, 1787; Varicorhinus capoeta (Güldenstädt, 1773); Scaphiodon macrolepisHeckel, 1847; Varicorhinus macrolepis (Heckel, 1847); Scaphiodon heratensis Keyserling, 1861; Scaphiodon asmussii Keyserling, 1861; Capoeta steindachneri Kessler, 1872; Capoeta hohenackeri Kessler, 1877; Capoeta gibbosa Nikolsky, 1897

= Capoeta capoeta =

Species of fish

Capoeta capoeta is a species of West Asian cyprinid fish, including forms called the Caucasian scraper. The scientific name is derived from the Georgian local name kapwaeti.

Some taxonomic authorities classify Capoeta sevangi as a subspecies.
