= List of data deficient fishes =

- Extinct in the wild (EW): 11 species
- Critically endangered (CR): 906 species
- Endangered (EN): 1,533 species
- Vulnerable (VU): 1,740 species
- Near threatened (NT, LR/cd): 1,042 species
- Least concern (LC): 18,621 species
- Data deficient (DD): 5,492 species
Fish species (IUCN, 2025-2)
- 29,447 extant species have been evaluated
- 23,955 of those are fully assessed (Note: excludes data deficient evaluations.)
- 19,663 are not threatened at present
- 4,292 to 9,784 are threatened (Note: Threatened comprises CR, EN and VU. Upper estimate additionally includes DD.)
- 113 to 268 are extinct or extinct in the wild:
  - 102 extinct (EX) species (Note: Chart omits extinct (EX) species)
  - 11 extinct in the wild (EW)
  - 147 possibly extinct [CR(PE)]
  - 8 possibly extinct in the wild [CR(PEW)]

In September 2016, the International Union for Conservation of Nature (IUCN) listed 3191 data deficient fish species. A data deficient species is one which has been categorized by the IUCN as offering insufficient information for a proper assessment of conservation status to be made. Of all evaluated fish species, 21% are listed as data deficient. The IUCN also lists 12 fish subspecies as data deficient.

Of the subpopulations of fishes evaluated by the IUCN, 34 species subpopulations have been assessed as data deficient.

This is a complete list of data deficient fish species and subspecies evaluated by the IUCN. Species and subspecies which have data deficient subpopulations (or stocks) are indicated.

== Cartilaginous fishes ==
Chondrichthyes includes sharks, rays, skates, and sawfish. There are 475 species and three subpopulations of cartilaginous fish evaluated as data deficient.

=== Rays and skates ===
There are 253 species and one subpopulation in the order Rajiformes evaluated as data deficient.

==== Narkids ====
- Sleeper torpedo (Crassinarke dormitor)
- Eilat electric ray (Heteronarce bentuviai)
- Lloyd's electric ray (Heteronarce mollis)
- Oval electric ray (Typhlonarke tarakea)

==== Eagle rays ====
- Bullnose ray (Myliobatis freminvillii)
- Roughskin bullray (Pteromylaeus asperrimus)

==== Guitarfish species ====
- Slender guitarfish (Rhinobatos holcorhynchus)
- Smoothback guitarfish (Rhinobatos lionotus)
- Smalleyed guitarfish (Rhinobatos microphthalmus)
- Bareback shovelnose ray (Rhinobatos nudidorsalis)
- Speckled guitarfish (Rhinobatos ocellatus)
- Madagascar guitarfish (Rhinobatos petiti)
- Gorgona guitarfish (Rhinobatos prahli)
- Spotted guitarfish (Rhinobatos punctifer)
- Banded guitarfish (Zapteryx exasperata)

==== Whiptail stingrays ====
- Giant stumptail stingray (Dasyatis gigantea)
- Marbled stingray (Dasyatis marmorata) Europe population
- Tortonese's stingray (Dasyatis tortonesei)
- Smalleye stingray (Megatrygon microps)
- Dwarf black stingray (Hemitrygon parvonigra)
- Heins' stingray (Hemitrygon yemenensis)
- Blackedge whipray (Himantura marginata)
- Chindwin cowtail ray (Makararaja chindwinensis)
- Kuhl's maskray (Neotrygon kuhlii)
- Ningaloo maskray (Neotrygon ningalooensis)
- Oceania fantail ray (Taeniura lessoni)
- Mumburarr whipray (Urogymnus acanthobothrium)

==== Narcinids ====
Species

- Atz's numbfish (Narcine atzi)
- Madagascar numbfish (Narcine insolita)
- Chinese numbfish (Narcine lingula)
- Darkspotted electric ray (Narcine maculata)
- Bigeye electric ray (Narcine oculifera)
- Narcine prodorsalis
- Mozambique numbfish (Narcine rierai)

Subpopulations

- Apron ray (Discopyge tschudii) (1 subpopulation)

==== Butterfly rays ====
- Tentacled butterfly ray (Gymnura tentaculata)

==== Skates ====
- Antarctic starry skate (Amblyraja georgiana)
- Reversed skate (Amblyraja reversa)
- Whiteleg skate (Amblyraja taaf)
- Breviraja claramaculata
- Lightnose skate (Breviraja colesi)
- Pygmy thornback skate (Dentiraja flindersi)
- Bullis' skate (Dipturus bullisi)
- Javelin skate (Dipturus doutrei)
- Ecuador skate (Dipturus ecuadoriensis)
- False argus skate (Dipturus falloargus)
- San Blas skate (Dipturus garricki)
- Giant skate (Dipturus gigas)
- Travencore skate (Dipturus johannisdavesi)
- Kwangtung skate (Dipturus kwangtungensis)
- Rattail skate (Dipturus lanceorostratus)
- Bigtail skate (Dipturus macrocauda)
- Blacktip skate (Dipturus melanospilus)
- Spreadfin skate (Dipturus olseni)
- Hooktail skate (Dipturus oregoni)
- Queensland deepwater skate (Dipturus queenslandicus)
- Roughbelly skate (Dipturus springeri)
- Prownose skate (Dipturus stenorhynchus)
- Acutenose skate (Dipturus tengu)
- Wu's skate (Dipturus wuhanlingi)
- Tiger-tail skate (Leucoraja compagnoi)
- Whitedappled skate (Leucoraja leucosticta)
- Yucatan skate (Leucoraja yucatanensis)
- Brazilian soft skate (Malacoraja obscura)
- West African pygmy skate (Neoraja africana)
- Carolina pygmy skate (Neoraja carolinensis)
- Sharpspine skate (Okamejei acutispina)
- Boeseman's skate (Okamejei boesemani)
- Narrow skate (Okamejei heemstrai)
- Yellow spotted skate (Okamejei hollandi)
- Okamejei mengae
- Okamejei philipi
- Indian ringed skate (Okamejei powelli)
- Browneye skate (Okamejei schmidti)
- Raja ackleyi
- Bahama skate (Raja bahamensis)
- Cortez ray (Raja cortezensis)
- Equatorial skate (Raja equatorialis)
- Cape Verde skate (Raja herwigi)
- Pita skate (Raja pita)
- Velez ray (Raja velezi)
- Annandale's skate (Rajella annandalei)
- Galapagos gray skate (Rajella eisenhardti)

==== Urotrygonids ====
- Chilean round stingray (Urobatis marmoratus)

==== Potamotrygonids ====
- Manzana ray (Paratrygon ajereba)
- Thorny river stingray (Potamotrygon constellata)
- Red-blotched river stingray (Potamotrygon ocellata)
- Tiger ray (Potamotrygon schroederi)
- Parana river stingray (Potamotrygon schuemacheri)
- Potamotrygon signata
- Maracaibo river stingray (Potamotrygon yepezi)

==== Urolophids ====
- New Ireland stingaree (Urolophus armatus)
- Kai stingaree (Urolophus kaianus)

==== Torpedinids ====
- New Zealand torpedo (Tetronarce fairchildi)
- Short-tail torpedo ray (Tetronarce macneilli)
- Rosette torpedo (Torpedo bauchotae)
- Blackspotted torpedo (Torpedo fuscomaculata)
- Gulf torpedo (Torpedo sinuspersici)

==== Softnose skates ====
- Longtail skate (Arhynchobatis asperrimus)
- Eaton's skate (Bathyraja eatonii)
- West African skate (Bathyraja hesperafricana)
- Abyssal skate (Bathyraja ishiharai)
- Sandpaper skate (Bathyraja kincaidii)
- Darkbelly skate (Bathyraja meridionalis)
- Bathyraja papilonifera
- Bathyraja schroederi
- Longnose deepsea skate (Bathyraja shuntovi)
- African softnose skate (Bathyraja smithii)
- Tuna's skate (Bathyraja tunae)
- Okhotsk skate (Bathyraja violacea)
- Brochiraja aenigma
- Brochiraja albilabiata
- Prickly deepsea skate (Brochiraja asperula)
- Brochiraja leviveneta
- Brochiraja microspinifera
- Spiny deepsea skate (Brochiraja spinifera)
- Blackfin pygmy skate (Fenestraja atripinna)
- Cuban pygmy skate (Fenestraja cubensis)
- Ishiyama's windowskate (Fenestraja ishiyamai)
- Madagascar pygmy skate (Fenestraja maceachrani)
- Fenestraja mamillidens
- Siboga pygmy skate (Fenestraja sibogae)
- Gulf of Mexico pygmy skate (Fenestraja sinusmexicanus)
- Eastern looseskin skate (Insentiraja laxipella)
- Western round skate (Irolita westraliensis)
- Notoraja hirticauda
- Pale skate (Notoraja ochroderma)
- Sapphire skate (Notoraja sapphira)
- Leadhued skate (Notoraja tobitukai)
- Yellow skate (Pavoraja arenaria)
- Freckled sandskate (Psammobatis lentiginosa)
- Smalltail sandskate (Psammobatis parvacauda)
- Spade sandskate (Psammobatis rutrum)
- Raspthorn sandskate (Psammobatis scobina)
- Magellan skate (Rhinoraja magellanica)

==== Anacanthobatidae ====
- American legskate (Anacanthobatis americanus)
- East China legskate (Anacanthobatis donghaiensis)
- Longnose legskate (Anacanthobatis longirostris)
- Anacanthobatis nanhaiensis
- Narrow legskate (Anacanthobatis stenosoma)
- Andaman legskate (Cruriraja andamanica)
- Atlantic legskate (Cruriraja atlantis)
- Broadfoot legskate (Cruriraja cadenati)
- Smoothnose legskate (Cruriraja durbanensis)
- Cuban legskate (Cruriraja poeyi)
- Rough legskate (Cruriraja rugosa)
- Blue legskate (Sinobatis caerulea)
- Eastern legskate (Sinobatis filicauda)

==== Cownose rays ====
- Australian cownose ray (Rhinoptera neglecta)

=== Ground sharks ===
There are 110 species and one subpopulation of ground shark evaluated as data deficient.

==== Requiem sharks ====
Subpopulations

- Night shark (Carcharhinus signatus) (1 subpopulation)

==== Houndsharks ====
- Sailback houndshark (Gogolia filewoodi)
- Eastern spotted gummy shark (Mustelus walkeri)

==== Catsharks ====
- Bighead catshark (Apristurus bucephalus)
- Longnose catshark (Apristurus kampae)
- South China catshark (Apristurus sinensis)
- Spongehead catshark (Apristurus spongiceps)
- Australian blotched catshark (Asymbolus funebris)
- Eastern banded catshark (Atelomycterus marnkalha)
- Arabian catshark (Bythaelurus alcockii)
- Broadhead catshark (Bythaelurus clevai)
- Sombre catshark (Bythaelurus incanus)
- Mud catshark (Bythaelurus lutarius)
- Cook's swellshark (Cephaloscyllium cooki)
- Spotted swellshark (Cephaloscyllium maculatum)
- Leopard-spotted swellshark (Cephaloscyllium pardelotum)
- Flagtail swellshark (Cephaloscyllium signourum)
- Speckled swellshark (Cephaloscyllium speccum)
- Narrowbar swellshark (Cephaloscyllium zebrum)
- Northern sawtail catshark (Figaro striatus)
- Slender sawtail catshark (Galeus gracilis)
- Quagga catshark (Halaelurus quagga)
- Grinning Izak (Holohalaelurus grennian)
- Beige catshark (Parmaturus bigus)
- McMillan's catshark (Parmaturus macmillani)
- Polkadot catshark (Scyliorhinus besnardi)
- West African catshark (Scyliorhinus cervigoni)
- Comoro catshark (Scyliorhinus comoroensis)
- Brownspotted catshark (Scyliorhinus garmani)
- Freckled catshark (Scyliorhinus haeckelii)
- Izu catshark (Scyliorhinus tokubee)

=== Carpet sharks ===
- Barbelthroat carpetshark (Cirrhoscyllium expolitum)
- Elongate carpet shark (Parascyllium elongatum)
- Ginger carpetshark (Parascyllium sparsimaculatum)

=== Squaliformes ===
There are 67 species and one subpopulation in the order Squaliformes evaluated as data deficient.

==== Centrophorids ====
Species

- Western gulper shark (Centrophorus westraliensis)
- Rough longnose dogfish (Deania hystricosa)

Subpopulations

- Gulper shark (Centrophorus granulosus) (1 subpopulation)

==== Echinorhinids ====
- Prickly shark

==== Squalids ====
- Roughskin spurdog (Cirrhigaleus asper)
- Southern mandarin shark (Cirrhigaleus australis)
- Chinese longnose dogfish (Squalus acutirostris)
- Western highfin spurdog (Squalus altipinnis)
- Longnose spurdog (Squalus blainville)
- Bighead spurdog (Squalus bucephalus)

==== Somniosids ====
- Whitetail dogfish (Scymnodalatias albicauda)
- Azores dogfish (Scymnodalatias garricki)
- Sherwood dogfish (Scymnodalatias sherwoodi)
- Frog shark (Somniosus longus)

==== Dalatiids ====
- South China cookiecutter shark (Isistius labialis)

==== Etmopterids ====
- Short-tail lanternshark (Etmopterus brachyurus)
- Slendertail lanternshark (Etmopterus molleri)
- Brown lanternshark (Etmopterus unicolor)

=== Chimaeras ===
There are 20 Chimaera species evaluated as data deficient.

==== Chimaerids ====
- Jordan's chimaera (Chimaera jordani)
- Owston's chimaera (Chimaera owstoni)
- Ninespot chimaera (Hydrolagus barbouri)

=== Bullhead sharks ===
- Oman bullhead shark (Heterodontus omanensis)
- Whitespotted bullhead shark (Heterodontus ramalheira)

== Lampreys ==
- Pouched lamprey (Geotria australis)
- Alaskan brook lamprey (Lethenteron alaskense)

== Ray-finned fishes ==
There are 2682 species, 12 subspecies, and one subpopulation of ray-finned fish evaluated as data deficient.

=== Salmoniformes ===
Species

- Coregonus baerii
- Coregonus heglingus
- Coregonus renke
- Valaam whitefish (Coregonus widegreni)
- Korean taimen (Hucho ishikawae)
- Oncorhynchus iwame
- Salmo dentex
- Ferox trout (Salmo ferox)
- Algerian trout (Salmo macrostigma)
- Rhône trout (Salmo rhodanensis)

Subspecies

- Coregonus sardinella baunti

Subpopulations

- Sockeye salmon (Oncorhynchus nerka) (31 subpopulations)

=== Silversides ===
- Atherina lopeziana
- Bean's silverside (Atherinella beani)
- Broadstripe silverside (Atherinella nesiotes)
- Basilichthys microlepidotus
- Bedotia sp. 'Garassa'
- Bleheratherina pierucciae
- Pima hardyhead (Craterocephalus pimatuae)
- Crenulated silverside (Hypoatherina crenolepis)
- Backwaters silverside (Membras analis)
- Plateada silverside (Membras argentea)
- Texas silverside (Menidia clarkhubbsi)
- Odontesthes gracilis
- Forktail blue-eye (Pseudomugil furcatus)
- Cape blue-eye (Pseudomugil majusculus)
- Rheocles pellegrini
- Rheocles sikorae

=== Toothcarps ===
There are 75 species and two subspecies of toothcarp evaluated as data deficient.

==== Aplocheilids ====
- Pachypanchax sp. 'Analava'
- Pachypanchax sp. 'Sofia'
- Pachypanchax sp. 'Tsiribihina'

==== Rivulids ====
- Anablepsoides monticola
- Anablepsoides peruanus
- Anablepsoides taeniatus
- Aphyolebias peruensis
- Aphyolebias wischmanni
- Cynodonichthys boehlkei
- Cynodonichthys elegans
- Cynodonichthys kuelpmanni
- Cynodonichthys leucurus
- Cynodonichthys pacificus
- Laimosemion rectocaudatus
- Neofundulus splendidus
- Spectrolebias brousseaui
- Spectrolebias filamentosus

==== Nothobranchiids ====
Species

- Caudal-stripe killi (Aphyosemion caudofasciatum)
- Chauche's aphysemion (Aphyosemion chauchei)
- Congo killi (Aphyosemion congicum)
- Aphyosemion decorsei
- Aphyosemion etsamense
- Heinemann's killi (Aphyosemion heinemanni)
- Aphyosemion hera
- Aphyosemion kouamense
- Aphyosemion lefiniense
- Aphyosemion schoutedeni
- Aphyosemion seegersi
- Aphyosemion trilineatus
- Wuendsch's killi (Aphyosemion wuendschi)
- Aphyosemion zygaima
- Callopanchax toddi
- Epiplatys multifasciatus
- Epiplatys zenkeri
- Fundulopanchax avichang
- Fundulopanchax gresensi
- Fundulopanchax intermittens
- Fundulopanchax mirabilis
- Fundulopanchax moensis
- Fundulopanchax robertsoni
- Fundulopanchax spoorenbergi
- Fundulopanchax traudeae
- Nothobranchius fasciatus
- Nothobranchius hassoni
- Beira killifish (Nothobranchius kuhntae)
- Nothobranchius malaissei
- Nothobranchius rubroreticulatus
- Nothobranchius virgatus
- Scriptaphyosemion chaytori
- Black river roloffia (Scriptaphyosemion nigrifluvi)

Subspecies

- Aphyosemion cameronense haasi
- Aphyosemion celiae winifredae

==== Poeciliids ====
- Aplocheilichthys nigrolateralis
- Brachyrhaphis roswithae
- Gambusia aestiputeus
- Dominican gambusia (Gambusia dominicensis)
- Gambusia lemaitrei
- Chain lampeye (Hypsopanchax catenatus)
- Neoheterandria elegans
- Eastcoast lampeye (Pantanodon stuhlmanni)
- Poecilia mechthildae
- Blackspotted livebearer (Poeciliopsis turneri)
- Priapichthys caliensis
- Priapichthys nigroventralis
- Pseudopoecilia austrocolumbiana
- Yellow swordtail (Xiphophorus clemenciae)

=== Cypriniformes ===
Cypriniformes includes carps, minnows, loaches and relatives. There are 610 species and two subspecies in the order Cypriniformes evaluated as data deficient.

==== Hillstream loaches ====
- Balitora haithanhi
- Balitora meridionalis
- Balitora nigrocorpa
- Balitora vanlani
- Balitora vanlongi
- Beaufortia daon
- Beaufortia leveretti
- Erromyzon sinensis
- Hemimyzon ecdyonuroides
- Hemimyzon elongatus
- Hemimyzon khonensis
- Hemimyzon nanensis
- Hemimyzon nujiangensis
- Hemimyzon pengi
- Hemimyzon songamensis
- Homaloptera bilineata
- Homaloptera confuzona
- Homaloptera modesta
- Homaloptera ogilviei
- Homaloptera parclitella
- Homaloptera sexmaculata
- Homaloptera tweediei
- Homaloptera vulgaris
- Liniparhomaloptera disparis
- Liniparhomaloptera monoloba
- Nemacheilus abyssinicus
- Nemacheilus binotatus
- Nemacheilus doonensis
- Nemacheilus masyae
- Nemacheilus ornatus
- Nemacheilus platiceps
- Nemacheilus selangoricus
- Nemacheilus stigmofasciatus
- Neonoemacheilus morehensis
- Neonoemacheilus peguensis
- Oreonectes furcocaudalis
- Flat-headed loach (Oreonectes platycephalus)
- Orthrias brandti
- Erzurum loach (Oxynoemacheilus araxensis)
- Elbistan loach (Oxynoemacheilus ceyhanensis)
- Oxynoemacheilus cinicus
- Lenkoran loach (Oxynoemacheilus lenkoranensis)
- Kor loach (Oxynoemacheilus tongiorgii)
- Paracobitis oligolepis
- Paranemachilus genilepis
- Physoschistura raoi
- Physoschistura rivulicola
- Protomyzon borneensis
- Pseudogastromyzon buas
- Pseudogastromyzon elongatus
- Pseudogastromyzon loos
- Pteronemacheilus meridionalis
- Schistura acuticephalus
- Schistura alticrista
- Schistura amplizona
- Schistura antennata
- Schistura aramis
- Schistura bachmaensis
- Tri band sumo loach (Schistura balteata)
- Schistura bella
- Schistura breviceps
- Schistura callichromus
- Schistura chapaensis
- Schistura cincticauda
- Schistura coruscans
- Schistura crabro
- Schistura dalatensis
- Schistura defectiva
- Schistura dubia
- Schistura ephelis
- Schistura fasciolata
- Schistura finis
- Schistura globiceps
- Schistura hagiangensis
- Schistura huongensis
- Schistura implicata
- Schistura incerta
- Schistura irregularis
- Schistura khamtanhi
- Schistura kloetzliae
- Schistura kohchangensis
- Schistura latidens
- Schistura macrocephalus
- Schistura macrotaenia
- Schistura maepaiensis
- Schistura menanensis
- Schistura moeiensis
- Schistura novemradiata
- Schistura orthocauda
- Schistura paucicincta
- Schistura paucifasciata
- Schistura pertica
- Schistura phongthoensis
- Schistura polytaenia
- Schistura psittacula
- Schistura pumatensis
- Schistura punctifasciata
- Schistura quaesita
- Schistura rikiki
- Schistura russa
- Schistura schultzi
- Schistura sertata
- Schistura sigillata
- Schistura similis
- Schistura sokolovi
- Schistura spilota
- Schistura suber
- Schistura tizardi
- Schistura uniformis
- Schistura waltoni
- Schistura xhatensis
- Schistura yersini
- Schistura yingjiangensis
- Schistura zonata
- Sectoria atriceps
- Sectoria heterognathos
- Sewellia diardi
- Sinogastromyzon chapaensis
- Sinogastromyzon daon
- Sinogastromyzon hagiangensis
- Sinogastromyzon hexaocellum
- Sinogastromyzon hypercorpus
- Sinogastromyzon maon
- Sinogastromyzon minutus
- Sinogastromyzon namnaensis
- Sinogastromyzon rugocauda
- Sinogastromyzon tonkinensis
- Triplophysa grahami
- Triplophysa kullmanni
- Vanmanenia crassicauda
- Vanmanenia homalocephala
- Vanmanenia microlepis
- Vanmanenia multiloba
- Vanmanenia nahangensis
- Vanmanenia serrilineata
- Vanmanenia striata
- Vanmanenia tetraloba
- Vanmanenia ventrosquamata
- Yunnanilus macrogaster
- Yunnanilus parvus

==== True loaches ====
- Acantopsis spectabilis
- Thiemmedh's horsefaced loach (Acantopsis thiemmedhi)
- Burmese border loach (Botia kubotai)
- Emperor botia (Botia udomritthiruji)
- Azerbaijani spined loach (Cobitis amphilekta)
- Cobitis arenae
- Cobitis guttata
- Cobitis longitaeniatus
- Cobitis phongnhaensis
- Cobitis squataeniatus
- Cobitis ylengensis
- Lepidocephalichthys menoni
- Lepidocephalus macrochir
- Leptobotia tchangi
- Microcobitis misgurnoides
- Misgurnus multimaculatus
- Pangio apoda
- Pangio elongata
- Pangio fusca
- Pangio longimanus
- Pangio lumbriciformis
- Parabotia banarescui
- Parabotia dubia
- Parabotia kimluani
- Parabotia lijiangensis
- Parabotia vancuongi
- Serpenticobitis octozona
- Serpenticobitis zonata
- Sinibotia longiventralis
- Golden zebra loach (Sinibotia pulchra)
- Sinibotia robusta
- Sinibotia superciliaris
- Sinibotia zebra
- Yasuhikotakia longidorsalis

==== Cyprinids ====
Species

- Abbottina binhi
- Acanthalburnus urmianus
- Acheilognathus deignani
- Acheilognathus elongatoides
- Acheilognathus kyphus
- Acheilognathus macropterus
- Acheilognathus meridianus
- Acheilognathus polyspinus
- Acheilognathus tonkinensis
- Acrossocheilus clivosius
- Acrossocheilus iridescens
- Acrossocheilus kreyenbergii
- Acrossocheilus lamus
- Acrossocheilus macrophthalmus
- Acrossocheilus malacopterus
- Acrossocheilus microstoma
- Acrossocheilus xamensis
- Bihorned barbel (Akrokolioplax bicornis)
- Anabarilius maculatus
- Anabarilius transmontanus
- Anabarilius xundianensis
- Ancherythroculter daovantieni
- Aspidoparia ukhrulensis
- Bangana lemassoni
- Bangana lippa
- Bangana sinkleri
- Bangana wui
- Bangana xanthogenys
- Bangana yunnanensis
- Barbodes cataractae
- Barbopsis devecchii
- Barbus aboinensis
- Barbus aloyi
- Barbus antinorii
- Gorgeous barb (Barbus bellcrossi)
- Linespotted ufipa barb (Barbus brachygramma)
- Barbus brevilateralis
- Barbus castrasibutum
- Barbus catenarius
- Barbus caudosignatus
- Barbus citrinus
- Barbus clauseni
- Barbus condei
- Barbus dartevellei
- Barbus deguidei
- Van barbel (Barbus ercisianus)
- Barbus erythrozonus
- Orangefin barb (Barbus eutaenia)
- Barbus gestetneri
- Barbus girardi
- Barbus greenwoodi
- Barbus guildi
- Barbus guineensis
- Barbus gulielmi
- Barbus hondeensis
- Barbus inaequalis
- Barbus iturii
- Barbus jubbi
- Barbus kuiluensis
- Barbus lagoensis
- Barbus lamani
- Barbus leptopogon
- Barbus longifilis
- Barbus lornae
- Barbus lorteti
- Barbus loveridgii
- Barbus lujae
- Barbus lukindae
- Barbus macedonicus
- Barbus machadoi
- Barbus macroceps
- Rhinofish (Barbus mariae)
- Barbus mawambi
- Barbus mediosquamatus
- Barbus microterolepis
- Barbus mirabilis
- Barbus mocoensis
- Barbus myersi
- Barbus nanningsi
- Barbus nigrifilis
- Barbus okae
- Barbus owenae
- Barbus pagenstecheri
- Barbus papilio
- Barbus paucisquamatus
- Barbus petchkovskyi
- Barbus pleurogramma
- Barbus profundus
- Barbus pumilus
- Barbus pygmaeus
- Four-spotted barb (Barbus quadripunctatus)
- Barbus rhinophorus
- Barbus rosae
- Barbus roussellei
- Barbus rouxi
- Kavirondo barb (Barbus sexradiatus)
- Barbus syntrechalepis
- Barbus tegulifer
- Barbus tetraspilus
- Barbus tetrastigma
- Barbus tiekoroi
- Barbus tomiensis
- Barbus tongaensis
- Barbus trispiloides
- Barbus urotaenia
- Red Pangani barb (Barbus venustus)
- Victoria barb (Barbus viktorianus)
- Barbus wellmani
- Barbus yeiensis
- Barilius bonarensis
- Day's baril (Barilius evezardi)
- Barilius radiolatus
- Betadevario ramachandrani
- Boraras naevus
- Van scraper (Capoeta kosswigi)
- Chu sharpray (Capoetobrama kuschakewitschi)
- Carassioides phongnhaensis
- Chagunius baileyi
- Yellowfin culter (Chanodichthys flavipinnis)
- Cirrhinus jullieni
- Cirrhinus rubirostris
- Clypeobarbus bomokandi
- Clypeobarbus schoutedeni
- Coptostomabarbus bellcrossi
- Crossocheilus nigriloba
- Cyprinus dai
- Cyprinus exophthalmus
- Cyprinus hieni
- Cyprinus hyperdorsalis
- Cyprinus longzhouensis
- Cyprinus melanes
- Cyprinus multitaeniatus
- Cyprinus quidatensis
- Danio aequipinnulus
- Celestial pearl danio (Danio margaritatus)
- Spotted danio (Danio nigrofasciatus)
- Dracula fish (Danionella dracula)
- Danionella mirifica
- Danionella priapus
- Devario acrostomus
- Devario affinis
- Devario annandalei
- Devario chrysotaeniatus
- Devario interruptus
- Devario jayarami
- Devario kakhienensis
- Fire bar danio (Devario maetaengensis)
- Devario manipurensis
- Devario ostreographus
- Devario quangbinhensis
- Devario salmonatus
- Devario shanensis
- Devario sondhii
- Devario strigillifer
- Devario trangi
- Discherodontus colemani
- Discherodontus halei
- Discherodontus parvus
- Discocheilus wui
- Discogobio microstoma
- Yellowcheek (Elopichthys bambusa)
- Flying fox (Epalzeorhynchos kalopterus)
- Mekong flying barb (Esomus longimanus)
- Cá ngua bac (Folifer brevifilis)
- Garra apogon
- Garra bibarbatus
- Garra cyrano
- Garra ethelewynnae
- Garra gracilis
- Garra imberba
- Karin-hills garra (Garra imberbis)
- Garra laichowensis
- Garra lancrenonensis
- Garra longipinnis
- Garra nigricollis
- Garra nujiangensis
- Philipps' garra (Garra phillipsi)
- Garra poilanei
- Garra qiaojiensis
- Garra robustus
- Garra salweenica
- Garra yiliangensis
- Gnathopogon taeniellus
- Gnathopogon tsinanensis
- Eyilikler gudgeon (Gobio battalgilae)
- Gobiobotia kolleri
- Gobiobotia longibarba
- Gobiobotia meridionalis
- Gobiobotia tungi
- Gymnocypris chui
- Gymnostomus inornatus
- Hainan minnow (Hainania serrata)
- Haludaria melanampyx
- Hampala salweenensis
- Hemibarbus macracanthus
- Hemibarbus songloensis
- Hemibarbus thacmoensis
- Hemiculter elongatus
- Hemiculter krempfi
- Hemiculter songhongensis
- Hemiculter tchangi
- Hemiculterella macrolepis
- Largescale silver carp (Hypophthalmichthys harmandi)
- Bighead carp (Hypophthalmichthys nobilis)
- Krishna carp (Hypselobarbus dobsoni)
- Canara barb (Hypselobarbus lithopidos)
- Hypsibarbus annamensis
- Hypsibarbus macrosquamatus
- Hypsibarbus oatesii
- Yellow eyed silver barb (Hypsibarbus pierrei)
- Hypsibarbus suvattii
- Labeo aff. mesops
- Labeo alticentralis
- Labeo barbatulus
- Labeo bottegi
- Labeo boulengeri
- Labeo brachypoma
- Labeo brunellii
- Labeo curchius
- Fuelleborn's labeo (Labeo fuelleborni)
- Labeo indramontri
- Labeo luluae
- Labeo maleboensis
- Labeo nigricans
- Labeo polli
- Labeo reidi
- Labeo rouaneti
- Labeo sorex
- Labeo stolizkae
- Labeo tongaensis
- Labeobarbus arambourgi
- Labeobarbus crassibarbis
- Labeobarbus dainellii
- Labeobarbus gananensis
- Labeobarbus gorgorensis
- Labeobarbus longissimus
- Labeobarbus lucius
- Labeobarbus rocadasi
- Labeobarbus surkis
- Labeobarbus vanderysti
- Ladigesocypris mermere
- Laocypris hispida
- Laubuca siamensis
- Leptobarbus hosii
- Saltan fish (Leptobarbus rubripinna)
- Leucaspius irideus
- Longiculter siahi
- Berzem (Luciobarbus kersin)
- Long spiky-head carp (Luciobrama macrocephalus)
- Luciosoma setigerum
- Mekongina bibarba
- Mekongina lancangensis
- Metzia alba
- Metzia hautus
- Microphysogobio labeoides
- Microphysogobio vietnamica
- Microphysogobio yunnanensis
- Black carp (Mylopharyngodon piceus)
- Neobarynotus microlepis
- Neobola bottegoi
- Neobola nilotica
- Neolissochilus baoshanensis
- Neolissochilus benasi
- Neolissochilus blythi
- Neolissochilus dukai
- Neolissochilus nigrovittatus
- Neolissochilus spinulosus
- Neolissochilus stevensonii
- Kiamichi shiner (Notropis ortenburgeri)
- Rocky shiner (Notropis suttkusi)
- Taiwan shoveljaw carp (Onychostoma barbatulum)
- Onychostoma barbatum
- Onychostoma elongatum
- Thintail shoveljaw carp (Onychostoma lepturum)
- Onychostoma lini
- Onychostoma ovale
- Onychostoma rarum
- Onychostoma simum
- Onychostoma uniforme
- Opsaridium boweni
- Opsaridium engrauloides
- Opsaridium leleupi
- Opsaridium maculicauda
- Opsaridium splendens
- Opsariichthys bea
- Opsariichthys hieni
- Opsariichthys songmaensis
- Opsarius caudiocellatus
- Opsarius cocsa
- Oreichthys crenuchoides
- Minute carp (Oreichthys parvus)
- Osteochilus brachynotopteroides
- Osteochilus sarawakensis
- Giant sharkminnow (Osteochilus schlegelii)
- Osteochilus serokan
- Osteochilus striatus
- Pachychilon macedonicum
- Pocket-like lip barbel (Paraspinibarbus macracanthus)
- Parazacco babeensis
- Parazacco spilurus
- Parazacco vinhi
- Parazacco vuquangensis
- Pelasgus minutus
- Percocypris tchangi
- Pethia macrogramma
- Pethia nankyweensis
- Odessa barb (Pethia padamya)
- Yüksekova chub (Petroleuciscus kurui)
- Phoxinellus crassus
- Placogobio bacmeensis
- Placogobio nahangensis
- Poropuntius aluoiensis
- Poropuntius angustus
- Poropuntius baolacensis
- Poropuntius brevispinus
- Poropuntius hampaloides
- Poropuntius hathe
- Poropuntius heterolepidotus
- Poropuntius huangchuchieni
- Poropuntius kontumensis
- Poropuntius krempfi
- Poropuntius margarianus
- Poropuntius melanogrammus
- Poropuntius opisthoptera
- Poropuntius shanensis
- Chinese-ink carp (Procypris mera)
- Prolabeo batesi
- Prolabeops nyongensis
- Pseudogobio guilinensis
- Pseudophoxinus callensis
- Pseudophoxinus irideus
- Bigeye ratmouth barbel (Ptychidio macrops)
- Bulu barb (Puntioplites bulu)
- Puntius ambassis
- Puntius amphibius
- Puntius burmanicus
- Mahecola barb (Puntius mahecola)
- Puntius schanicus
- Raiamas ansorgii
- Raiamas kheeli
- Raiamas levequei
- Raiamas longirostris
- Raiamas scarciensis
- Raiamas shariensis
- Goldstripe rasbora (Rasbora chrysotaenia)
- Rasbora gerlachi
- Rasbora septentrionalis
- Rectoris luxiensis
- Rosy bitterling (Rhodeus ocellatus)
- Rhodeus vietnamensis
- Sarcocheilichthys hainanensis
- Saurogobio immaculatus
- Scaphiodonichthys macracanthus
- Scaphiodonichthys microcorpus
- Schizopygopsis anteroventris
- Schizopygopsis thermalis
- Schizopygopsis younghusbandi
- Schizothorax curvilabiatus
- Kumaon snowtrout (Schizothorax kumaonensis)
- Schizothorax lantsangensis
- Schizothorax malacanthus
- Schizothorax meridionalis
- Schizothorax molesworthi
- Schizothorax nukiangensis
- Schizothorax yunnanensis
- Semilabeo notabilis
- Semiplotus cirrhosus
- Semiplotus manipurensis
- Burmese kingfish (Semiplotus modestus)
- Sikukia flavicaudata
- Sikukia gudgeri
- Sinibrama melrosei
- Sinilabeo binhluensis
- Spinibarbus babeensis
- Spinibarbus brevicephalus
- Spinibarbus caldwelli
- Spinibarbus hollandi
- Spinibarbus maensis
- Spinibarbus nammauensis
- Spinibarbus ovalius
- Spinibarbus vittatus
- Squalidus argentatus
- Squalidus intermedius
- Squalidus maii
- Barbel chub (Squaliobarbus curriculus)
- Squalius seyhanensis
- Squalius spurius
- White Cloud Mountain minnow (Tanichthys albonubes)
- Vietnamese white cloud minnow (Tanichthys micagemmae)
- Tanichthys thacbaensis
- Tor barakae
- Tor laterivittatus
- Tor polylepis
- Tor sinensis
- Tor tambra
- Tor tambroides
- Toxabramis hoffmanni
- Toxabramis hotayensis
- Toxabramis maensis
- Toxabramis nhatleensis
- Varicorhinus angorae
- Varicorhinus brauni
- Varicorhinus clarkeae
- Varicorhinus iphthimostoma
- Varicorhinus jaegeri
- Varicorhinus jubae
- Varicorhinus latirostris
- Varicorhinus longidorsalis
- Varicorhinus lufupensis
- Varicorhinus pellegrini
- Varicorhinus robertsi
- Varicorhinus semireticulatus
- Varicorhinus stenostoma
- Varicorhinus upembensis
- Varicorhinus varicostoma
- Varicorhinus wittei
- Xenocypris hupeinensis

Subspecies

- Osteobrama cotio peninsularis
- Rhodeus atremius suigensis

==== Psilorhynchids ====
- Psilorhynchus amplicephalus
- Psilorhynchus arunachalensis
- Psilorhynchus brachyrhynchus
- Psilorhynchus breviminor
- Psilorhynchus gokkyi
- Psilorhynchus melissa
- Psilorhynchus pavimentatus
- Psilorhynchus piperatus
- Psilorhynchus rahmani
- Psilorhynchus robustus

==== Suckers ====
- Rio Grande sucker (Catostomus plebeius)
- Summer sucker (Catostomus utawana)

=== Bonefishes ===
- Silver sharpjaw bonefish (Albula argentea)
- Korean bonefish (Albula koreana)
- Caribbean bonefish (Albula nemoptera)
- Smallscale bonefish (Albula oligolepis)
- Longjaw bonefish (Albula virgata)
- Longfin bonefish (Pterothrissus belloci)
- Japanese gissu (Pterothrissus gissu)

=== Gasterosteiformes ===
Includes sticklebacks and relatives.

- Korean sandlance (Hypoptychus dybowskii)
- Pungitius bussei
- Sakhalin Stickleback (Pungitius tymensis)

=== Osmeriformes ===
Includes freshwater smelts and allies.

- Baird's slickhead (Alepocephalus bairdii)
- Network slickhead (Bajacalifornia arcylepis)
- Elongated searsid (Barbantus elongatus)
- Bathylaco macrophthalmus
- Bathylaco nielseni
- Bathylychnops brachyrhynchus
- Brachygalaxias bullocki
- Brachygalaxias gothei
- Flathead slickhead (Conocara nigrum)
- Dolichopteryx anascopa
- Galaxias globiceps
- Small pedder galaxias (Galaxias parvus)
- Cape galaxias (Galaxias zebratus)
- Leptoderma macrophthalmum
- Nansenia iberica
- Nansenia longicauda
- Nansenia megalopa
- Nansenia pelagica
- Neosalanx argentea
- Neosalanx brevirostris
- Normichthys herringi
- Ayu (Plecoglossus altivelis)
- Protosalanx chinensis
- Chinese noodlefish (Salanx chinensis)
- Noodlefish (Salanx cuvieri)
- Salanx reevesii

=== Catfishes ===
There are 439 catfish species evaluated as data deficient.

==== Amblycipitids ====
- Amblyceps caecutiens
- Amblyceps carinatum
- Amblyceps macropterus
- Amblyceps murraystuarti
- Amblyceps platycephalus
- Amblyceps protentum
- Amblyceps serratum
- Amblyceps tenuispinis
- Amblyceps torrentis
- Amblyceps tuberculatum
- Amblyceps variegatum
- Nahangbagrus songamensis
- Xiurenbagrus xiurenensis

==== Heptapterids ====
- Cetopsorhamdia filamentosa
- Chasmocranus peruanus
- Chasmocranus quadrizonatus
- Imparfinis timana
- Phenacorhamdia nigrolineata
- Pimelodella altipinnis
- Pimelodella buckleyi
- Pimelodella chaparae
- Pimelodella cyanostigma
- Pimelodella hartwelli
- Pimelodella montana
- Pimelodella ophthalmica
- Pimelodella peruana
- Pimelodella peruensis
- Pimelodella roccae
- Rhamdella rusbyi

==== Astroblepids ====
- Astroblepus boulengeri
- Astroblepus cacharas
- Astroblepus caquetae
- Astroblepus frenatus
- Astroblepus jimenezae
- Astroblepus labialis
- Astroblepus longiceps
- Astroblepus mancoi
- Astroblepus marmoratus
- Astroblepus martinezi
- Astroblepus nicefori
- Astroblepus peruanus
- Astroblepus praeliorum
- Astroblepus regani
- Astroblepus rengifoi
- Astroblepus riberae
- Astroblepus rosei
- Astroblepus sabalo
- Astroblepus santanderensis
- Astroblepus stuebeli
- Astroblepus taczanowskii
- Astroblepus vaillanti
- Astroblepus vanceae
- Astroblepus whymperi

==== Sisorids ====
- Bagarius rutilus
- Exostoma barakensis
- Exostoma berdmorei
- Exostoma stuarti
- Exostoma vinciguerrae
- Glaridoglanis andersonii
- Glyptosternon malaisei
- Glyptothorax brevipinnis
- Glyptothorax buchanani
- Glyptothorax chimtuipuiensis
- Glyptothorax conirostris
- Glyptothorax coracinus
- Glyptothorax filicatus
- Glyptothorax fuscus
- Glyptothorax gracilis
- Glyptothorax honghensis
- Mesopotamian sucking catfish (Glyptothorax kurdistanicus)
- Glyptothorax malabarensis
- Glyptothorax pallozonum
- Glyptothorax pallozonus
- Glyptothorax panda
- Glyptothorax prashadi
- Glyptothorax quadriocellatus
- Glyptothorax rugimentum
- Glyptothorax siamensis
- Glyptothorax sinensis
- Glyptothorax strabonis
- Gogangra laevis
- Myersglanis blythii
- Nangra bucculenta
- Nangra ornata
- Oreoglanis colurus
- Oreoglanis delacouri
- Oreoglanis frenata
- Oreoglanis insignis
- Pai river bat catfish (Oreoglanis laciniosus)
- Oreoglanis macronemus
- Mr. Seub's bat catfish (Oreoglanis nakasathiani)
- Oreoglanis setiger
- Dr. Surapol's bat catfish (Oreoglanis sudarai)
- Doi Tung bat catfish (Oreoglanis suraswadii)
- Slender-tail bat catfish (Oreoglanis tenuicauda)
- Silaphet waterfall bat catfish (Oreoglanis vicinus)
- Pareuchiloglanis brevicaudatus
- Pareuchiloglanis dorsoarcus
- Pareuchiloglanis feae
- Pareuchiloglanis kamengensis
- Pareuchiloglanis macropterus
- Pareuchiloglanis macrotrema
- Pareuchiloglanis namdeensis
- Pareuchiloglanis nebulifer
- Pareuchiloglanis phongthoensis
- Pareuchiloglanis rhabdurus
- Pareuchiloglanis songdaensis
- Pareuchiloglanis tamduongensis
- Pseudecheneis crassicauda
- Pseudecheneis eddsi
- Pseudecheneis immaculata
- Pseudecheneis intermedia
- Pseudecheneis maurus
- Jhong jian jhe jhao catfish (Pseudecheneis paviei)
- Pseudecheneis suppaetula
- Pseudecheneis sympelvica
- Sisor chennuah
- Sisor rheophilus
- Sisor torosus

==== Silurids ====
- Kryptopterus dissitus
- Kryptopterus lumholtzi
- Kryptopterus paraschilbeides
- Micronema cheveyi
- Ompok goae
- Ompok leiacanthus
- Ompok pinnatus
- Phalacronotus micronemus
- Pterocryptis bokorensis
- Pterocryptis buccata
- Pterocryptis cucphuongensis
- Pterocryptis gangelica
- Pterocryptis indicus
- Aristotle's catfish (Silurus aristotelis)
- Silurus burmanensis
- Silurus furness
- Wallago micropogon

==== Trichomycterids ====
- Stenolicmus sarmientoi
- Trichomycterus areolatus
- Trichomycterus bomboizanus
- Trichomycterus latidens
- Trichomycterus romeroi
- Trichomycterus straminius
- Trichomycterus taczanowskii
- Tridensimilis venezuelae

==== Loach catfishes ====
- Amphilius lampei
- Amphilius lentiginosus
- Amphilius maesii
- Amphilius opisthophthalmus
- Belonoglanis brieni
- Dolichamphilius longiceps
- Leptoglanis bouilloni
- Phractura bovei
- Phractura fasciata
- Phractura gladysae
- Phractura macrura
- Phractura stiassny
- Psammphiletria delicata
- Psammphiletria nasuta
- Tetracamphilius angustifrons
- Tetracamphilius clandestinus
- Tetracamphilius pectinatus
- Trachyglanis intermedius
- Trachyglanis minutus
- Trachyglanis sanghensis
- Zaireichthys camerunensis
- Chobe sand catlet (Zaireichthys dorae)
- Zaireichthys flavomaculatus
- Zaireichthys mandevillei
- Zaireichthys zonatus

==== Claroteids ====
- Amarginops platus
- Chrysichthys furcatus
- Buzi grunter (Chrysichthys hildae)
- Chrysichthys levequei
- Chrysichthys macropterus
- Chrysichthys uniformis
- Gephyroglanis gymnorhynchus
- Gephyroglanis habereri
- Notoglanidium depierrei
- Parauchenoglanis ahli
- Parauchenoglanis buettikoferi
- Somalian giant catfish (Pardiglanis tarabinii)

==== Airbreathing catfishes ====
- Channallabes longicaudatus
- Channallabes ogooensis
- Channallabes sanghaensis
- Channallabes teugelsi
- Clariallabes attemsi
- Clariallabes brevibarbis
- Clariallabes manyangae
- Clariallabes simeonsi
- Clarias engelseni
- Alikunhii's blind catfish (Horaglanis alikunhii)
- Indian blind catfish (Horaglanis krishnai)
- Platyclarias machadoi

==== Loricariids ====
- Ancistrus greeni
- Ancistrus heterorhynchus
- Ancistrus jelskii
- Ancistrus lineolatus
- Ancistrus variolus
- Chaetostoma aburrensis
- Chaetostoma alternifasciatum
- Chaetostoma anale
- Chaetostoma breve
- Chaetostoma dermorhynchum
- Chaetostoma paucispinis
- Chaetostoma vagum
- Cordylancistrus platycephalus
- Cordylancistrus platyrhynchus
- Dolichancistrus atratoensis
- Farlowella altocorpus
- Farlowella gracilis
- Farlowella yarigui
- Hypoptopoma bilobatum
- Hypostomus levis
- Hypostomus niceforoi
- Hypostomus oculeus
- Leptoancistrus cordobensis
- Lipopterichthys carrioni
- Loricariichthys cashibo
- Loricariichthys chanjoo
- Blue-eye panaque (Panaque suttonorum)
- Pseudohemiodon thorectes
- Rhadinoloricaria macromystax
- Rineloricaria lima
- Rineloricaria sneiderni
- Spatuloricaria atratoensis
- Spatuloricaria caquetae
- Spatuloricaria curvispina
- Spatuloricaria euacanthagenys
- Squaliforma virescens
- Sturisoma caquetae
- Sturisomatichthys aureus
- Sturisomatichthys tamanae

==== Mochokids ====
- Atopochilus chabanaudi
- Atopochilus macrocephalus
- Atopochilus mandevillei
- Atopochilus pachychilus
- Atopochilus vogti
- Atopodontus adriaensi
- Chiloglanis angolensis
- Chiloglanis lamottei
- Chiloglanis lufirae
- Chiloglanis marlieri
- Chiloglanis modjensis
- Neumann's suckermouth (Chiloglanis neumanni)
- Chiloglanis niger
- Suckermouth catlet (Chiloglanis niloticus)
- Chiloglanis reticulatus
- Chiloglanis sp. 'Kerio'
- Chiloglanis sp. 'Northern Ewaso Nyiro'
- Euchilichthys boulengeri
- Microsynodontis armatus
- Microsynodontis batesii
- Microsynodontis emarginata
- Microsynodontis hirsuta
- Microsynodontis laevigata
- Microsynodontis lamberti
- Microsynodontis nannoculus
- Microsynodontis nasutus
- Microsynodontis notata
- Microsynodontis polli
- Microsynodontis vigilis
- Synodontis acanthoperca
- Synodontis camelopardalis
- Synodontis caudovittatus
- Synodontis iturii
- Synodontis khartoumensis
- Synodontis kogonensis
- Synodontis laessoei
- Synodontis leopardus
- Synodontis longispinis
- Feather-barbelled squeaker (Synodontis manni)
- Synodontis marmoratus
- Synodontis multimaculatus
- Synodontis ouemeensis
- Synodontis pulcher
- Synodontis punctulatus
- Synodontis rebeli
- Synodontis robertsi
- Synodontis sp. 'Lower Tana'
- Synodontis vaillanti
- Synodontis woleuensis
- Synodontis xiphias
- Eastcoast squeaker (Synodontis zanzibaricus)

==== Stream catfishes ====
- Falcate chameleon catfish (Acrochordonichthys gyrinus)
- Maeklong chameleon catfish (Acrochordonichthys septentrionalis)
- Akysis bilustris
- Akysis clavulus
- Akysis clinatus
- Akysis ephippifer
- Akysis fuliginatus
- Akysis maculipinnis
- Akysis manipurensis
- Burmese stream catfish (Akysis pictus)
- Akysis portellus
- Akysis pulvinatus
- Akysis recavus
- Akysis varius
- Akysis vespa
- Akysis vespertinus
- Pseudobagarius filifer
- Pseudobagarius hardmani
- Pseudobagarius inermis
- Pseudobagarius leucorhynchus
- Pseudobagarius nitidus
- Pseudobagarius subtilis

==== Ariids ====
- Rough-head sea catfish (Carlarius latiscutatus)
- Belize sea catfish (Cathorops belizensis)
- Congo sea catfish (Cathorops fuerthii)
- Cathorops steindachneri
- Taylor's sea catfish (Cathorops taylori)
- Besudo sea catfish (Cathorops tuyra)
- Wayuu sea catfish (Cathorops wayuu)
- River catfish (Cephalocassis jatia)
- Froggatt's catfish (Cinetodus froggatti)
- Flat catfish (Cochlefelis insidiator)
- Taylor's catfish (Neoarius taylori)
- Nato sea-catfish (Notarius armbrusteri)
- Flathead sea-catfish (Notarius insculptus)
- Freckled sea catfish (Notarius lentiginosus)
- Passany sea catfish (Sciades passany)
- Lorentz catfish (Tetranesodon conorhynchus)

==== Bagrids ====
- Bagrichthys majusculus
- Bagrus filamentosus
- Bagrus lubosicus
- Somalia catfish (Bagrus urostigma)
- Batasio affinis
- Batasio dayi
- Batasio elongatus
- Batasio macronotus
- Batasio merianiensis
- Batasio procerus
- Batasio spilurus
- Batasio tigrinus
- Hemibagrus camthuyensis
- Hemibagrus centralus
- Hemibagrus chiemhoaensis
- Hemibagrus dongbacensis
- Hemibagrus filamentus
- Hemibagrus guttatus
- Hemibagrus hongus
- Hemibagrus imbrifer
- Hemibagrus songdaensis
- Hemibagrus taybacensis
- Hemibagrus variegatus
- Hemibagrus vietnamicus
- Chinese longsnout catfish (Leiocassis longirostris)
- Mystus cineraceus
- Mystus rhegma
- Pseudomystus bomboides
- Pseudomystus sobrinus
- Tachysurus brevirostris
- Tachysurus kyphus
- Tachysurus longispinalis
- Tachysurus spilotus
- Tachysurus tonkinensis
- Tachysurus vachellii
- Tachysurus virgatus
- Tachysurus yeni

==== Schilbeids ====
- Ailia punctata
- Clupisoma bastari
- Clupisoma roosae
- Eutropiichthys goongwaree
- Eutropiichthys salweenensis
- Khavalchor catfish (Neotropius khavalchor)
- Somalia glass catfish (Parailia somalensis)
- Proeutropiichthys buchanani
- Pseudeutropius indigens
- Schilbe angolensis
- Schilbe nyongensis
- Schilbe zairensis

==== Callichthyids ====
- Corydoras albolineatus
- Corydoras atropersonatus
- Corydoras bilineatus
- Corydoras cruziensis
- Corydoras isbrueckeri
- Corydoras mamore
- Corydoras negro
- Corydoras noelkempffi
- Corydoras pantanalensis
- Corydoras paragua
- Corydoras paucerna
- Corydoras reynoldsi

==== Erethistids ====
- Ayarnangra estuarius
- Conta conta
- Conta pectinata
- Erethistoides ascita
- Erethistoides cavatura
- Erethistoides infuscatus
- Erethistoides montana
- Erethistoides pipri
- Erethistoides senkhiensis
- Erethistoides sicula
- Hara koladynensis
- Hara longissima
- Hara spinulus
- Pseudolaguvia austrina
- Pseudolaguvia ferruginea
- Pseudolaguvia ferula
- Pseudolaguvia flavida
- Pseudolaguvia foveolata
- Pseudolaguvia inornata
- Pseudolaguvia muricata
- Pseudolaguvia tenebricosa
- Pseudolaguvia tuberculata
- Pseudolaguvia virgulata

==== Other catfish species ====
- Ancharius sp. 'Onilahy'
- Bunocephalus colombianus
- Centromochlus altae
- Cetopsis fimbriata
- Cetopsis jurubidae
- Chaca burmensis
- Estuary catfish (Cnidoglanis macrocephalus)
- Diplomystes chilensis
- Gelanoglanis travieso
- Glanidium catharinensis
- Gogo brevibarbis
- Rat-faced pangasiid (Helicophagus leptorhynchus)
- Heteropneustes longipectoralis
- Hypodoras forficulatus
- Bagre del panuco (Ictalurus australis)
- Headwater catfish (Ictalurus lupus)
- Olyra burmanica
- Olyra horae
- Elongate catfish (Pangasius elongatus)
- Pangasius myanmar
- Paradoxoglanis cryptus
- Pseudobunocephalus quadriradiatus
- Pseudolais micronemus

=== Gonorynchiformes ===
Includes milkfish, beaked salmon and allies.

- Cromeria occidentalis
- Kneria ansorgii
- Kneria sjolandersi
- Parakneria damasi
- Parakneria fortuita
- Parakneria kissi
- Parakneria ladigesi
- Parakneria lufirae
- Parakneria malaissei
- Parakneria marmorata
- Parakneria thysi
- Parakneria vilhenae

=== Batrachoidiformes ===
- Walker's toadfish (Batrachoides walkeri)
- Daector gerringi
- Daector quadrizonatus
- Smalleye midshipman (Porichthys oculellus)
- Ocellated toadfish (Porichthys oculofrenum)
- Cozumel toadfish (Sanopus johnsoni)

=== Elopiformes ===
- Pacific ladyfish (Elops affinis)
- Giant herring (Elops hawaiensis)
- Senegalese ladyfish (Elops senegalensis)
- Southern ladyfish (Elops smithi)
- Indo-Pacific tarpon (Megalops cyprinoides)

=== Perciformes ===
There are 786 species and two subspecies in the order Perciformes evaluated as data deficient.

==== Temperate perches ====
- Percilia gillissi
- Percilia irwini
- Siniperca fortis
- Siniperca kneri
- Slender mandarinfish (Siniperca roulei)
- Golden mandarin fish (Siniperca scherzeri)
- Siniperca vietnamensis

==== Gouramis ====
- Betta apollon
- Betta ferox
- Betta kuehnei
- Betta pallida
- Emerald green betta (Betta smaragdina)
- Betta stiktos
- Red-backed paradise fish (Macropodus erythropterus)
- Black paradisefish (Macropodus spechti)

==== Cichlids ====
Species

- Andinoacara sapayensis
- Apistogramma atahualpa
- Apistogramma huascar
- Apistogramma nijsseni
- Apistogramma norberti
- Apistogramma pantalone
- Apistogramma paulmuelleri
- Apistogramma payaminonis
- Apistogramma rositae
- Apistogramma rubrolineata
- Aulonocara brevirostris
- Aulonocara trematocephala
- Buccochromis atritaeniatus
- Buccochromis oculatus
- Bujurquina ortegai
- Bujurquina pardus
- Bujurquina robusta
- Angola happy (Chetia welwitschi)
- Chromidotilapia elongata
- Chromidotilapia nana
- Congochromis pugnatus
- Copadichromis inornatus
- Copadichromis sp. 'Virginalis Kajose'
- Copadichromis virginalis
- Coptodon nigricans
- Crenicichla prenda
- Cyprichromis microlepidotus
- Diplotaxodon ecclesi
- Etia nguti
- Geophagus pellegrini
- Haplochromis acidens
- Haplochromis altigenis
- Haplochromis arcanus
- Haplochromis artaxerxes
- Haplochromis bartoni
- Haplochromis bayoni
- Haplochromis bloyeti
- Haplochromis boops
- Haplochromis cavifrons
- Haplochromis chlorochrous
- Haplochromis chrysogynaion
- Haplochromis cinereus
- Haplochromis cronus
- Haplochromis cryptodon
- Haplochromis cryptogramma
- Haplochromis decticostoma
- Haplochromis diplotaenia
- Haplochromis dolichorhynchus
- Haplochromis empodisma
- Haplochromis erythrocephalus
- Haplochromis estor
- Haplochromis eutaenia
- Haplochromis gilberti
- Haplochromis goldschmidti
- Haplochromis gowersii
- Haplochromis harpakteridion
- Haplochromis humilior
- Haplochromis kujunjui
- Haplochromis labriformis
- Haplochromis lacrimosus
- Haplochromis lividus
- Haplochromis loati
- Haplochromis luluae
- Haplochromis macrops
- Haplochromis maculipinna
- Haplochromis maisomei
- Haplochromis mandibularis
- Haplochromis melanopus
- Haplochromis melichrous
- Haplochromis mento
- Haplochromis nigrescens
- Haplochromis niloticus
- Haplochromis nuchisquamulatus
- Haplochromis nyanzae
- Haplochromis obtusidens
- Haplochromis pachycephalus
- Haplochromis pallidus
- Haplochromis paradoxus
- Haplochromis paraguiarti
- Haplochromis paraplagiostoma
- Haplochromis parorthostoma
- Haplochromis pellegrini
- Haplochromis pharyngomylus
- Haplochromis phytophagus
- Haplochromis pitmani
- Haplochromis plagiostoma
- Haplochromis prodromus
- Haplochromis prognathus
- Haplochromis pseudopellegrini
- Haplochromis saxicola
- Haplochromis serranus
- Haplochromis simotes
- Haplochromis sp. 'Chala'
- Haplochromis spekii
- Haplochromis squamulatus
- Haplochromis thuragnathus
- Haplochromis tridens
- Haplochromis tyrianthinus
- Haplochromis victoriae
- Haplochromis worthingtoni
- Lamprologus finalimus
- Lamprologus lethops
- Lamprologus symoensi
- Lepidiolamprologus kendalli
- Lethrinops longipinnis
- Neolamprologus buescheri
- Neolamprologus olivaceous
- Neolamprologus wauthioni
- Oreochromis ismailiaensis
- Paratilapia bleekeri
- Paratilapia sp. 'Fiamanga'
- Paratilapia sp. 'Lac Ihotry'
- Paratilapia toddi
- Damba (Paretroplus damii)
- Paretroplus lamenabe
- Kotso (Paretroplus petiti)
- Pelmatochromis ocellifer
- Pelvicachromis subocellatus
- Perissodus eccentricus
- Petrochromis macrognathus
- Protomelas macrodon
- Pseudotropheus fuscoides
- Pseudotropheus fuscus
- Rhamphochromis ferox
- Sargochromis thysi
- Serranochromis janus
- Steatocranus bleheri
- Steatocranus mpozoensis
- Steatocranus rouxi
- Steatocranus ubanguiensis
- Tahuantinsuyoa macantzatza
- Slender pike cichlid (Teleocichla centisquama)
- Thoracochromis wingatii
- Tilapia ismailiaensis
- Tilapia rheophila
- Trematocara zebra
- Tylochromis elongatus
- Tylochromis praecox
- Tylochromis trewavasae
- Xenochromis hecqui
- Xenotilapia albini
- Xenotilapia melanogenys
- Xenotilapia nasus
- Xenotilapia spiloptera

Subspecies

- Cichlasoma urophthalmum ericymba
- Pseudocrenilabrus multicolor multicolor

==== Odontobutidae ====
- Micropercops hotayensis
- Neodontobutis macropectoralis
- Neodontobutis tonkinensis
- Odontobutis potamophilus
- Sineleotris namxamensis

==== Epinephelids ====
- Rusty hind (Cephalopholis aitha)
- Golden hind (Cephalopholis aurantia)
- Banded grouper (Epinephelus awoara)
- Palemargin grouper (Epinephelus bontoides)
- Dogtooth grouper (Epinephelus caninus)
- Epinephelus chabaudi
- Tonga grouper (Epinephelus chlorocephalus)
- Coral grouper (Epinephelus corallicola)
- Goldblotch grouper (Epinephelus costae)
- Dotted grouper (Epinephelus epistictus)
- Cloudy grouper (Epinephelus erythrurus)
- Epinephelus fasciatomaculosus
- Barred-chest grouper (Epinephelus faveatus)
- Dungat grouper (Epinephelus goreensis)
- Bridled grouper (Epinephelus heniochus)
- Somali grouper (Epinephelus indistinctus)
- Laterally-banded grouper (Epinephelus latifasciatus)
- Mystery grouper (Epinephelus lebretonianus)
- Epinephelus magniscuttis
- One-blotch grouper (Epinephelus melanostigma)
- Epinephelus polystigma
- Striped-fin grouper (Epinephelus posteli)
- Pacific goliath grouper (Epinephelus quinquefasciatus)
- Red-tipped grouper (Epinephelus retouti)
- Sixbar grouper (Epinephelus sexfasciatus)
- Epaulet grouper (Epinephelus stoliczkae)
- Seamount grouper (Epinephelus suborbitalis)
- Summan grouper (Epinephelus summana)
- Greasy grouper (Epinephelus tauvina)
- Yellowspotted grouper (Epinephelus timorensis)
- Plumb grouper (Epinephelus trophis)
- Maori cod (Epinephelus undulatostriatus)
- Brown-lined reef cod (Epinephelus undulosus)
- Masked grouper (Gracila albomarginata)
- Darwin grouper (Hyporthodus darwinensis)
- Tenspine grouper (Hyporthodus exsul)
- Haifa grouper (Hyporthodus haifensis)
- Star-studded grouper (Hyporthodus niphobles)
- Eightbar grouper (Hyporthodus octofasciatus)
- Puzzling grouper (Hyporthodus perplexus)
- Venezuelan grouper (Mycteroperca cidi)
- Marbled coralgrouper (Plectropomus punctatus)
- Saloptia powelli

==== Eleotrids ====
- Throatspine gudgeon (Belobranchus belobranchus)
- Island gudgeon (Bostrichthys aruensis)
- Barred gudgeon (Bostrychus zonatus)
- Eleotris annobonensis
- Hawaii spinecheek gudgeon (Eleotris sandwicensis)
- Eleotris vomerodentata
- Erotelis armiger
- Guavina micropus
- Tropical carp-gudgeon (Hypseleotris cyprinoides)
- Blind gudgeon (Milyeringa veritas)
- Oxyeleotris urophthalmoides
- Paniai gudgeon (Oxyeleotris wisselensis)
- Ratsirakia legendrei

==== Gobies ====
- Scaly boy (Aboma etheostoma)
- Malagasy mountain mullet (Acentrogobius therezieni)
- Dark-tail specter-goby (Akko brevis)
- Atlantic specter goby (Akko dionaea)
- Blackfin specter goby (Akko rossi)
- Beautiful-cheek shrimpgoby (Amblyeleotris callopareia)
- Astrabe fasciata
- Saddlebanded goby (Barbulifer mexicanus)
- Panther goby (Barbulifer pantherinus)
- Twin-spotted frillfin (Bathygobius geminatus)
- Bathygobius ostreicola
- Benthophiloides brauneri
- Bollmannia gomezi
- Bollmannia longpinnus
- Frailscale goby (Bollmannia macropoma)
- Apostrophe goby (Bollmannia marginalis)
- Pennant goby (Bollmannia ocellata)
- Bollmannia pawneea
- Tailspot goby (Bollmannia stigmatura)
- Dusky goby (Bollmannia umbrosa)
- Sabanus bumblebee goby (Brachygobius sabanus)
- Bumblebee fish (Brachygobius xanthozonus)
- Bigeye callibus (Cabillus macrophthalmus)
- Deepwater goby (Chriolepis benthonis)
- Rail goby (Chriolepis cuneata)
- Rubble goby (Chriolepis minutillus)
- Mystery goby (Chriolepis tagus)
- Onespot goby (Coryogalops monospilus)
- Kuna goby (Coryphopterus kuna)
- Cotylopus acutipinnis
- Cryptocentrus leonis
- Ben-Tuvia's goby (Didogobius bentuvii)
- Ebomegobius goodi
- Widebanded cleaning goby (Elacatinus limbaughi)
- Panamanian greenbanded goby (Elacatinus panamensis)
- Redcheek goby (Elacatinus rubrigenis)
- White-margined goby (Enypnias aceras)
- Eugnathogobius microps
- Eric's goby (Evermannia erici)
- Enigmatic goby (Evermannia longipinnis)
- Panama goby (Evermannia panamensis)
- Bicolored sponge goby (Evermannichthys bicolor)
- Tenant goby (Evermannichthys convictor)
- Pugnose goby (Evermannichthys silus)
- Celebes goby (Glossogobius celebius)
- Hoese's goby (Glossogobius hoesei)
- Glossogobius sparsipapillus
- Gobioides grahamae
- Choco goby (Gobionellus daguae)
- Gulf goby (Gobionellus liolepis)
- Gobiopterus chuno
- Gobiopterus stellatus
- Knobchin goby (Gobiosoma nudum)
- Schmidt's goby (Gobius strictus)
- Tiger goby (Gobius tigrellus)
- Bright goby (Ilypnus luculentus)
- Corfu dwarf goby (Knipowitschia goerneri)
- Knipowitschia montenegrina
- Hawaiian freshwater goby (Lentipes concolor)
- Lentipes rubrofasciatus
- Lentipes solomonensis
- Lentipes venustus
- Luciogobius albus
- Luciogobius pallidus
- Cheek-spotted goby (Lythrypnus alphigena)
- Knave goby (Lythrypnus cobalus)
- Spotcheek goby (Lythrypnus rhizophora)
- Sola's goby (Lythrypnus solanensis)
- Mangarinus waterousi
- Mugilogobius fasciatus
- Obscure mangrove goby (Mugilogobius fusculus)
- Mugilogobius nuicocensis
- Paintedfin goby (Oligolepis acutipennis)
- Plain teardrop goby (Oligolepis stomias)
- Papuligobius uniporus
- Dark goby (Parrella fusca)
- Darkblotch goby (Parrella ginsburgi)
- Priolepis sticta
- Blunt-snout goby (Psilotris amblyrhynchus)
- Secret goby (Pycnomma semisquamatum)
- Lekutu goby (Redigobius lekutu)
- Lever's goby (Redigobius leveri)
- Oyens goby (Redigobius oyensi)
- Amur goby (Rhinogobius brunneus)
- Rhinogobius honghensis
- Rhinogobius imfasciocaudatus
- Rhinogobius longipinnis
- Rhinogobius maculicervix
- Rhinogobius milleri
- Rhinogobius nammaensis
- Rhinogobius nganfoensis
- Rhinogobius vermiculatus
- Rhinogobius vexillifer
- Rhinogobius vinhensis
- Robin's goby (Robinsichthys arrowsmithensis)
- Scartelaos cantoris
- Redneck goby (Schismatogobius deraniyagalai)
- Schismatogobius fuligimentus
- Schismatogobius vanuatuensis
- Sicydium bustamantei
- Sicydium gilberti
- Titi (Sicydium plumieri)
- Sicyopterus cynocephalus
- Sicyopterus fasciatus
- Red-tailed goby (Sicyopterus halei)
- Sicyopterus longifilis
- Sicyopterus marquesensis
- Sicyopterus micrurus
- Sicyopterus ouwensi
- Sicyopterus punctissimus
- Sicyopus cebuensis
- Sicyopus discordipinnis
- Lipstick goby (Sicyopus jonklaasi)
- Silhouettea evanida
- Silhouettea nuchipunctatus
- Smilosicyopus bitaeniatus
- Smilosicyopus leprurus
- Smilosicyopus pentecost
- Stenogobius alleni
- Stenogobius caudimaculosus
- Stenogobius marqueti
- Stenogobius psilosinionus
- Stenogobius randalli
- Stenogobius squamosus
- Stenogobius watsoni
- Stigmatogobius borneensis
- Stiphodon astilbos
- Stiphodon hydroreibatus
- Stiphodon kalfatak
- Stiphodon larson
- Stiphodon mele
- Stiphodon pelewensis
- Stiphodon percnopterygionus
- Stiphodon semoni
- Whiskered eel goby (Taenioides cirratus)
- Taenioides kentalleni
- Whiteband goby (Varicus imswe)
- Orangebelly goby (Varicus marilynae)
- Lemon goby (Vomerogobius flavus)

==== Badids ====
- Badis assamensis
- Badis chittagongis
- Badis corycaeus
- Badis dibruensis
- Badis kanabos
- Badis siamensis
- Scarlet badis (Dario dario)

==== Sparids ====
- Acanthopagrus akazakii
- Bridled seabream (Acanthopagrus catenula)
- Japanese silver bream (Acanthopagrus latus)
- Bengal yellowfin seabream (Acanthopagrus longispinnis)
- Black margined seabream (Acanthopagrus omanensis)
- Middle East black seabream (Acanthopagrus randalli)
- Acanthopagrus taiwanensis
- Argyrops megalommatus
- Striped boga (Boops lineatus)
- Campeche porgy (Calamus campechanus)
- Santer seabream (Cheimerius nufar)
- Crenidens macracanthus
- Dentex fourmanoiri
- Lithognathus olivieri
- Blueskin seabream (Polysteganus coeruleopunctatus)
- Polysteganus mascarenensis
- Rhabdosargus niger
- Sparidentex belayewi
- Sparidentex datnia

==== Scombrids ====
- Short mackerel (Rastrelliger brachysoma)
- Island mackerel (Rastrelliger faughni)
- Indian mackerel (Rastrelliger kanagurta)
- Indo-Pacific king mackerel (Scomberomorus guttatus)
- Japanese Spanish mackerel (Scomberomorus niphonius)
- Kanadi kingfish (Scomberomorus plurilineatus)
- Chinese mackerel (Scomberomorus sinensis)
- Longtail tuna (Thunnus tonggol)

==== Dragonets ====
- Whitegill dragonet (Callionymus leucobranchialis)
- Callionymus macclesfieldensis
- Flathead dragonet (Callionymus platycephalus)
- Whitehead's deepwater dragonet (Callionymus whiteheadi)
- Protogrammus sousai
- Synchiropus valdiviae
- Tonlesapia tsukawakii

==== Lutjanids ====
- Ruby snapper (Etelis carbunculus)
- Queen snapper (Etelis oculatus)
- African red snapper (Lutjanus agennes)
- Blackfin snapper (Lutjanus buccanella)
- African brown snapper (Lutjanus dentatus)
- Guinea snapper (Lutjanus endecacanthus)
- Gorean snapper (Lutjanus goreensis)
- Dog snapper (Lutjanus jocu)
- Yellowtail snapper (Ocyurus chrysurus)
- Japanese snapper (Paracaesio caerulea)

==== Sand stargazers ====
- Dactylagnus peratikos
- Imitator sand-stargazer (Dactyloscopus zelotes)
- Flagfin stargazer (Gillellus inescatus)
- Dartfish (Myxodagnus belone)
- Sailfinned stargazer (Platygillellus smithi)

==== Anabantidae ====
- Gangetic koi (Anabas cobojius)
- Ctenopoma ashbysmithi
- Microctenopoma lineatum
- Microctenopoma milleri
- Microctenopoma pekkolai
- Cape kurper (Sandelia capensis)

==== Sciaenids ====
- Black-spot croaker (Atrobucca kyushini)
- Chaptis bahaba (Bahaba chaptis)
- Black croaker (Cheilotrema saturnum)
- Corvina drum (Cilus gilberti)
- Vacuocua croaker (Corvula macrops)
- Peruvian barbel drum (Ctenosciaena peruviana)
- Queen corvina (Cynoscion albus)
- Hake weakfish (Cynoscion nortoni)
- Shortfin corvina (Cynoscion parvipinnis)
- Boccone weakfish (Cynoscion praedatorius)
- Orangemouth weakfish (Cynoscion xanthulus)
- Smooth croaker (Johnius laevis)
- Trewavas croaker (Johnius trewavasae)
- Blackfin croaker (Lonchurus elegans)
- Dogteeth weakfish (Macrodon mordax)
- California corbina (Menticirrhus undulatus)
- Micropogonias fasciatus
- Micropogonias manni
- Panama croaker (Ophioscion panamensis)
- Paranebris bauchotae
- Odd high-hat (Pareques perissa)
- Sciaena wieneri
- Little croaker (Stellifer stellifer)
- Professor stardrum (Stellifer walkeri)
- Amigo stardrum (Stellifer wintersteenorum)
- Umbrina imberbis
- Fusca drum (Umbrina ronchus)
- Steindachner's drum (Umbrina steindachneri)
- Cortez croaker (Umbrina wintersteeni)

==== Labrisomids ====
- Cottoclinus canops
- Hidden blenny (Cryptotrema seftoni)
- Uncombed blenny (Haptoclinus apectolophus)
- Four-fin blenny (Haptoclinus dropi)
- Labrisomus pomaspilus
- Labrisomus wigginsi
- Senegal blenny (Malacoctenus africanus)
- Malacoctenus costaricanus
- Topgallant blenny (Paraclinus altivelis)
- Leastfoot blenny (Paraclinus ditrichus)
- Hose blenny (Starksia hoesei)
- Scalybelly blenny (Starksia lepidogaster)
- Whitesaddle blenny (Starksia leucovitta)
- Brownspotted blenny (Starksia posthon)
- Darksaddle blenny (Starksia sella)
- Starksia springeri
- Starksia variabilis
- Forked bar blenny (Starksia y-lineata)

==== Serranids ====
- Argentine seabass (Acanthistius brasilianus)
- Anthias cyprinoides
- Anthias helenensis
- Dactylanthias aplodactylus
- Grape-eye seabass (Hemilutjanus macrophthalmos)
- Holanthias caudalis
- Holanthias fronticinctus
- Jarocho hamlet (Hypoplectrus atlahua)
- Contoy hamlet (Hypoplectrus ecosur)
- Bicolored hamlet (Hypoplectrus maculiferus)
- Scalyfin basslet (Liopropoma longilepis)
- Yellow-spotted golden bass (Liopropoma olneyi)
- Spot-tail golden bass (Liopropoma santi)
- Meganthias carpenteri
- Goldspotted sand bass (Paralabrax auroguttatus)
- Southern rock bass (Paralabrax callaensis)
- Peruvian rock seabass (Paralabrax humeralis)
- Parrot sand bass (Paralabrax loro)
- Plectranthias pallidus
- Blacktail comber (Serranus atricauda)

==== Chaenopsids ====
- Thornbush blenny (Acanthemblemaria harpeza)
- Dwarf spinyhead blenny (Acanthemblemaria paula)
- Cortez pikeblenny (Chaenopsis coheni)
- Delta pikeblenny (Chaenopsis deltarrhis)
- Pikeblenny (Chaenopsis megalops)
- Stephen's pikeblenny (Chaenopsis stephensi)
- Slit-pore tube blenny (Ekemblemaria lira)
- Ridge blenny (Emblemaria culmenis)
- Filament blenny (Emblemaria hyltoni)
- Whiteback signal blenny (Emblemaria nivipes)
- Elusive signal blenny (Emblemaria walkeri)
- Arawak blenny (Emblemariopsis arawak)
- Orangeflag blenny (Emblemariopsis dianae)
- Hornless blenny (Emblemariopsis randalli)
- Fringed tube blenny (Protemblemaria perla)
- Tanyemblemaria alleni

==== Combtooth blennies ====
- Adelotremus leptus
- Alloblennius frondiculus
- Leaping blenny (Alticus saliens)
- Andamia cyclocheilus
- Andamia expansa
- Andamia heteroptera
- Suckerlip blenny (Andamia reyi)
- Andamia tetradactylus
- Antennablennius sexfasciatus
- Antennablennius velifer
- Bathyblennius antholops
- Haptogenys bipunctata
- Tidepool blenny (Hypsoblennius caulopus)
- Hypsoblennius maculipinna
- Threadless blenny (Meiacanthus anema)
- Meiacanthus erdmanni
- Meiacanthus limbatus
- Meiacanthus phaeus
- Meiacanthus reticulatus
- Microlipophrys bauchotae
- Omobranchus robertsi
- Omobranchus steinitzi
- Omox blenny (Omox biporos)
- Parablennius verryckeni
- Phenablennius heyligeri
- Plagiotremus iosodon
- Rhabdoblennius papuensis
- Spaniblennius clandestinus
- Spaniblennius riodourensis

==== Microdesmids ====
- Spotted worm goby (Cerdale ionthas)
- Mangrove worm-goby (Cerdale paludicola)
- Many-spined worm-goby (Cerdale prolata)
- Olivaceous wormfish (Microdesmus affinis)
- Microdesmus africanus
- Banded wormfish (Microdesmus dipus)
- Spotback wormfish (Microdesmus dorsipunctatus)
- Dark-tailed worm-goby (Microdesmus hildebrandi)
- Long-tailed worm-goby (Microdesmus intermedius)
- Fat-lipped worm-goby (Microdesmus knappi)
- Blind wormfish (Microdesmus luscus)
- Giant worm-goby (Microdesmus multiradiatus)
- Rearfin wormfish (Microdesmus retropinnis)
- Spotside wormfish (Microdesmus suttkusi)
- Parioglossus lineatus
- Dart goby (Parioglossus marginalis)
- Parioglossus neocaledonicus
- Parioglossus triquetrus

==== Wrasses ====
- Lined wrasse (Anampses lineatus)
- Anampses viridis
- Bodianus flavipinnis
- Bodianus izuensis
- Bodianus neopercularis
- Bodianus oxycephalus
- Five-striped hogfish (Bodianus paraleucosticticus)
- Bodianus rubrisos
- Crescent-tail hogfish (Bodianus sepiacaudus)
- Bodianus solatus
- Blackbar hogfish (Bodianus speciosus)
- Bodianus tanyokidus
- Bodianus thoracotaeniatus
- Azurio tuskfin (Choerodon azurio)
- Choerodon gymnogenys
- Choerodon paynei
- Cirrhilabrus balteatus
- Cirrhilabrus brunneus
- Blueside wrasse (Cirrhilabrus cyanopleura)
- Exquisite wrasse (Cirrhilabrus exquisitus)
- Whip-fin wrasse (Cirrhilabrus filamentosus)
- Pulauweh wrasse (Cirrhilabrus joanallenae)
- Rhomboid wrasse (Cirrhilabrus rhomboidalis)
- Rosy-scales fairy-wrasse (Cirrhilabrus rubrisquamis)
- Red-eye wrasse (Cirrhilabrus solorensis)
- Threadfin wrasse (Cirrhilabrus temminckii)
- Tono's wrasse (Cirrhilabrus tonozukai)
- Clepticus africanus
- Blackbar coris (Coris nigrotaenia)
- Largescale wrasse (Decodon grandisquamis)
- Ten-tooth wrasse (Decodon pacificus)
- Frontilabrus caeruleus
- Mangrove wrasse (Halichoeres aestuaricola)
- Halichoeres bleekeri
- Brazilian wrasse (Halichoeres brasiliensis)
- Halichoeres melas
- Peliciers wrasse (Halichoeres pelicieri)
- Halichoeres raisneri
- Red-head wrasse (Halichoeres rubricephalus)
- Halichoeres signifer
- Hemigymnus sexfasciatus
- Iniistius cyanifrons
- Geisha wrasse (Iniistius geisha)
- Java razorfish (Iniistius javanicus)
- Three banded razorfish (Iniistius trivittatus)
- Lappanella guineensis
- Four-line wrasse (Larabicus quadrilineatus)
- Leptojulis lambdastigma
- Malapterus reticulatus
- Blackmargin Maori wrasse (Oxycheilinus nigromarginatus)
- Carpenter's flasher wrasse (Paracheilinus carpenteri)
- Braun's senator wrasse (Pictilabrus brauni)
- Bleeding wrasse (Polylepion cruentum)
- Pseudocheilinus dispilus
- Pseudocoris aequalis
- Pseudocoris ocellata
- Polynesian slender wrasse (Pseudojuloides atavai)
- Candy wrasse (Pseudojuloides cerasinus)
- Long green wrasse (Pseudojuloides elongatus)
- Yellow slender wrasse (Pseudojuloides xanthomos)
- Pteragogus aurigarius
- Scarus chinensis
- Midnight parrotfish (Scarus coelestinus)
- Spot-fin parrotfish (Scarus maculipinna)
- Scarus obishime
- Knobsnout parrotfish (Scarus ovifrons)
- Zelinda's parrotfish (Scarus zelindae)
- Dhofar parrotfish (Scarus zufar)
- Galápagos sheephead wrasse (Semicossyphus darwini)
- Asian sheepshead wrasse (Semicossyphus reticulatus)
- Longtail weed whiting (Siphonognathus tanyourus)
- Gray parrotfish (Sparisoma axillare)
- Agassiz's parrotfish (Sparisoma frondosum)
- Grey parrotfish (Sparisoma griseorubrum)
- Striped trawl wrasse (Suezichthys bifurcatus)
- Russell's slender wrasse (Suezichthys russelli)
- Ascension wrasse (Thalassoma ascensionis)
- Slant-band wrasse (Thalassoma loxum)
- St. Helena wrasse (Thalassoma sanctaehelenae)
- Seven-banded wrasse (Thalassoma septemfasciatum)
- Pigmy possum wrasse (Wetmorella tanakai)
- Xyrichtys koteamea
- Xyrichtys rajagopalani
- Xyrichtys sciistius
- Triple-barred razorfish (Xyrichtys trivittatus)

==== Threefin blennies ====
- Windward triplefin (Enneanectes wilki)
- Enneapterygius sheni
- Helcogramma larvata
- Helcogramma maldivensis
- Solor triplefin (Helcogramma solorensis)
- Helcogrammoides antarcticus

==== Haemulids ====
- Black margate (Anisotremus surinamensis)
- Torroto grunt (Genyatremus cavifrons)
- White margate (Haemulon album)
- Sheephead grunt (Orthopristis cantharinus)
- Orthopristis forbesi
- Scalyfin grunt (Orthopristis lethopristis)
- Parakuhlia macrophthalmus
- Rubberlip grunt (Plectorhinchus mediterraneus)
- Burro grunt (Pomadasys crocro)
- Bigspine grunt (Pomadasys empherus)
- Smalleye grunt (Pomadasys schyrii)
- Peruvian selema (Xenichthys rupestris)

==== Apogonids ====
- Ambon cardinalfish (Apogon amboinensis)
- Half-lined cardinalfish (Apogon semilineatus)
- Conchfish (Astrapogon stellatus)
- Foa madagascariensis
- Gymnapogon melanogaster
- Paxton's cardinalfish (Paxton concilians)

==== Ambassids ====
- Agassiz's perchlet (Ambassis agassizii)
- Dusky glass perch (Ambassis fontoynonti)
- Estuarine glass perchlet (Ambassis macracanthus)
- Parambassis alleni
- High-finned glass perchlet (Parambassis altipinnis)
- Humphead glassfish (Parambassis pulcinella)
- Pseudambassis roberti
- Kokoda glass perchlet (Tetracentrum caudovittatus)

==== Acanthurids ====
- Multibar surgeonfish (Acanthurus polyzona)
- Reticulated unicornfish (Naso reticulatus)
- Naso tuberosus
- Yellowtail sawtail (Prionurus chrysurus)
- Japanese sawtail (Prionurus scalprum)
- Jewelled tang (Zebrasoma gemmatum)
- Longnose tang (Zebrasoma rostratum)

==== Butterflyfishes ====
- Narrow-barred butterflyfish (Amphichaetodon melbae)
- Chaetodon andamanensis
- Bluelashed butterflyfish (Chaetodon bennetti)
- Spot-tail butterflyfish (Chaetodon ocellicaudus)
- Mailed butterflyfish (Chaetodon reticulatus)
- Gueze's butterflyfish (Prognathodes guezei)
- Prognathodes guyotensis
- Oblique butterflyfish (Prognathodes obliquus)

==== Other Perciformes species ====
- African sergeant (Abudefduf hoefleri)
- Lesser sand eel (Ammodytes tobianus)
- Longfin burrower (Apodocreedia vanderhorsti)
- Reunion angelfish (Apolemichthys guezei)
- Bathymaster derjugini
- Bankslope tilefish (Caulolatilus dooleyi)
- Blueline tilefish (Caulolatilus microps)
- Yellowbar tilefish (Caulolatilus williamsi)
- Centropomus poeyi
- Guinean bandfish (Cepola pauciradiata)
- Bluespotted angelfish (Chaetodontoplus caeruleopunctatus)
- Orange-spotted snakehead (Channa aurantimaculata)
- Barca snakehead (Channa barca)
- Channa ornatipinnis
- Channa pulchra
- Bearded warbonnet (Chirolophis snyderi)
- Cobalt chromis (Chromis flavicauda)
- Cirrhitus albopunctatus
- Clinus ornatus
- Largespot eel blenny (Congrogadus amplimaculatus)
- Pilbara eelblenny (Congrogadus winterbottomi)
- Whitefin sharksucker (Echeneis neucratoides)
- Threefinger threadfin (Eleutheronema tridactylum)
- Enigmapercis acutirostris
- Equulites laterofenestra
- Periche mojarra (Eugerres periche)
- Nonbanded whipfin mojarra (Gerres infasciatus)
- Cuban gramma (Gramma dejongi)
- Gymnelus barsukovi
- Sixband hawkfish (Isocirrhitus sexfasciatus)
- Black marlin (Istiompax indica)
- Kuhlia malo
- Kuhlia munda
- Salele flagtail (Kuhlia salelea)
- Rudolf lates (Lates longispinis)
- Silver scabbardfish (Lepidopus caudatus)
- Coromandel hairtail (Lepturacanthus pantului)
- Red snout emperor (Lethrinus reticulatus)
- Yellow basslet (Lipogramma flavescens)
- Yellowbar basslet (Lipogramma robinsi)
- Lycenchelys platyrhina
- Lycodes sadoensis
- Microichthys sanzoi
- Myxodes ornatus
- Nandus andrewi
- Freshwater damsel (Neopomacentrus taeniurus)
- Spotted snakeblenny (Ophiclinops pardalis)
- Opistognathus brochus
- Opistognathus fenmutis
- Opistognathus smithvanizi
- Opistognathus walkeri
- Pacific beakfish (Oplegnathus insignis)
- Knifejaw (Oplegnathus woodwardi)
- Paracaristius nudarcus
- Paracirrhites bicolor
- Parapercis atlantica
- Patagonotothen kreffti
- Patagonotothen thompsoni
- Balkhash perch (Perca schrenkii)
- Longhead darter (Percina macrocephala)
- Eel blenny (Peronedys anguillaris)
- Rubyfish (Plagiogeneion macrolepis)
- Platyberyx andriashevi
- Platyberyx mauli
- Atlantic wreckfish (Polyprion americanus)
- Sand lance (Protammodytes sarisa)
- Pseudochromis omanensis
- Loach goby (Rhyacichthys aspro)
- Rhyacichthys guilberti
- Estuarine perch (Sander marinus)
- Silver-banded whiting (Sillago argentifasciata)
- Indian whiting (Sillago indica)
- Sphyraena intermedia
- Cortez barracuda (Sphyraena lucasana)
- Spicara martinicus
- Freshwater gregory (Stegastes otophorus)
- Shortbill spearfish (Tetrapturus angustirostris)
- Roundscale spearfish (Tetrapturus georgii)
- Zebra archerfish (Toxotes blythii)
- Sailfin weever (Trachinus collignoni)
- Chilean jack mackerel (Trachurus murphyi)
- Upeneus randalli
- Zoarchias neglectus

=== Beloniformes ===
- Dermogenys brachynotopterus
- Peruvian flyingfish (Exocoetus peruvianus)
- California halfbeak (Hyporhamphus rosae)
- Poso halfbeak (Nomorhamphus celebensis)
- Hainan medaka (Oryzias curvinotus)
- Oryzias haugiangensis
- Oryzias pectoralis
- Oryzias songkhramensis
- Oryzias uwai
- Allen's river garfish (Zenarchopterus alleni)
- Zenarchopterus caudovittatus
- Bangkok halfbeak (Zenarchopterus pappenheimi)

=== Synbranchiformes ===
- Inle swamp eel (Chaudhuria caudata)
- Chaudhuria fusipinnis
- Macrognathus lineatomaculatus
- Macrognathus meklongensis
- Macrognathus obscurus
- Macrognathus pavo
- Mastacembelus ansorgii
- Mastacembelus pantherinus
- Mastacembelus shiloangoensis
- Mastacembelus thacbaensis
- Mastacembelus undulatus
- Liberian swamp eel (Monopterus boueti)
- Monopterus digressus
- Monopterus hodgarti
- Monopterus roseni
- Ophisternon afrum
- Pillaia kachinica
- Malabar swamp eel (Rakthamichthys indicus)

=== Gymnotiformes ===
- Apteronotus apurensis
- Apteronotus jurubidae
- Apteronotus milesi
- Rhamphichthys atlanticus
- Sternarchorhynchus curvirostris

=== Osteoglossiformes ===
There are 40 species in the order Osteoglossiformes evaluated as data deficient.

==== Mormyrids ====
- Campylomormyrus cassaicus
- Campylomormyrus luapulaensis
- Campylomormyrus orycteropus
- Gnathonemus barbatus
- Heteromormyrus pauciradiatus
- Hippopotamyrus aelsbroecki
- Hippopotamyrus harringtoni
- Hippopotamyrus macroterops
- Hippopotamyrus retrodorsalis
- Marcusenius bentleyi
- Marcusenius deboensis
- Marcusenius devosi
- Marcusenius dundoensis
- Marcusenius intermedius
- Marcusenius macrophthalmus
- Southern bulldog (Marcusenius pongolensis)
- Mormyrops batesianus
- Mormyrops intermedius
- Mormyrops microstoma
- Mormyrops oudoti
- Mormyrops parvus
- Bernhard's elephant-snout fish (Mormyrus bernhardi)
- Mormyrus felixi
- Mormyrus hildebrandti
- Mormyrus niloticus
- Mormyrus thomasi
- Paramormyrops batesii
- Ghost stonebasher (Paramormyrops jacksoni)
- Paramormyrops kingsleyae
- Petrocephalus cunganus
- Petrocephalus gliroides
- Petrocephalus hutereaui
- Petrocephalus keatingii
- Petrocephalus squalostoma
- Pollimyrus guttatus
- Pollimyrus maculipinnis
- Pollimyrus pedunculatus
- Stomatorhinus ater
- Stomatorhinus schoutedeni

==== Arapaimids ====
- Agassiz’s arapaima (Arapaima agassizii)
- Arapaima (Arapaima gigas)
- Slender arapaima (Arapaima leptosoma)
- Mapa arapaima (Arapaima mapae)

=== Gobiesociformes ===
- Whiskereye clingfish (Derilissus kremnobates)
- Tailspot clingfish (Derilissus lombardii)
- Dwarf clingfish (Derilissus nanus)
- Red-striped clingfish (Derilissus vittiger)
- Thick clingfish (Gobiesox crassicorpus)
- Lonely clingfish (Gobiesox marijeanae)
- Millers clingfish (Gobiesox milleri)
- Gobiesox multitentaculus
- Narrow-headed clingfish (Gobiesox stenocephalus)
- Opeatogenys cadenati
- Southern fraildisc clingfish (Pherallodiscus varius)
- Coral clingfish (Tomicodon clarkei)
- Reticulate clingfish (Tomicodon lavettsmithi)
- Ecuadorian clingfish (Tomicodon prodomus)

=== Characiformes ===
There are 110 species in the order Characiformes evaluated as data deficient.

==== Alestids ====
- Brachypetersius notospilus
- Brycinus abeli
- Brycinus carmesinus
- Brycinus comptus
- Brycinus humilis
- Hemigrammopetersius pulcher
- Micralestes ambiguus
- Micralestes holargyreus
- Micralestes schelly
- Micralestes vittatus
- Phenacogrammus bleheri
- Phenacogrammus stigmatura
- Phenacogrammus taeniatus
- Rhabdalestes aeratis

==== Distichodontids ====
- Distichodus langi
- Dundocharax bidentatus
- Hemigrammocharax lineostriatus
- Nannocharax fasciolaris
- Nannocharax hollyi
- Nannocharax micros
- Nannocharax ogoensis
- Nannocharax pteron
- Nannocharax reidi
- Neolebias gracilis
- Neolebias philippei
- Paraphago rostratus

==== Characids ====
- Acestrocephalus anomalus
- Argopleura conventus
- Astyanacinus yariguies
- Astyanax chaparae
- Astyanax fasslii
- Astyanax gisleni
- Astyanax kennedyi
- Astyanax longior
- Astyanax megaspilura
- Astyanax villwocki
- Bryconacidnus hemigrammus
- Bryconamericus arilepis
- Bryconamericus foncensis
- Bryconamericus guizae
- Bryconamericus icelus
- Bryconamericus ichoensis
- Bryconamericus miraensis
- Bryconamericus multiradiatus
- Bryconamericus simus
- Ceratobranchia elatior
- Cheirodon australe
- Cheirodon galusdae
- Cheirodon kiliani
- Cheirodon luelingi
- Cheirodon pisciculus
- Chrysobrycon eliasi
- Creagrutus yanatili
- Gephyrocharax caucanus
- Gephyrocharax martae
- Gephyrocharax sinuensis
- Gephyrocharax torresi
- Hemibrycon brevispini
- Hemibrycon cairoense
- Hemibrycon carrilloi
- Hemibrycon decurrens
- Hemibrycon divisorensis
- Hemibrycon microformaa
- Hemibrycon paez
- Hemibrycon quindos
- Hemibrycon raqueliae
- Hemibrycon santamartae
- Hemibrycon velox
- Hemibrycon virolinica
- Hemibrycon yacopiae
- Hemigrammus megaceps
- Hyphessobrycon amaronensis
- Hyphessobrycon chocoensis
- Hyphessobrycon columbianus
- Hyphessobrycon condotensis
- Hyphessobrycon sebastiani
- Hyphessobrycon wajat
- Knodus delta
- Knodus mizquae
- Microgenys lativirgata
- Microgenys weyrauchi
- Moenkhausia crisnejas
- Moenkhausia dorsinuda
- Moenkhausia orteguasae
- Nematobrycon lacortei
- Nematobrycon palmeri
- Parastremma album
- Parastremma pulchrum
- Parastremma sadina
- Prodontocharax howesi
- Pseudochalceus bohlkei
- Pseudochalceus kyburzi
- Pterobrycon landoni
- Brazilian blind characid (Stygichthys typhlops)
- Trochilocharax ornatus
- Tyttobrycon hamatus

==== Crenuchids ====
- Characidium heinianum
- Characidium sanctjohanni
- Characidium schindleri
- Characidium stigmosum
- Melanocharacidium melanopteron

==== Other Characiformes species ====
- Brycon acuminatus
- Brycon coxeyi
- Brycon medemi
- Lebiasina narinensis
- Leporinus holostictus
- Parodon atratoensis
- Pseudocurimata boehlkei
- Pyrrhulina obermulleri

=== Syngnathiformes ===
Syngnathiformes includes the pipefishes and seahorses. There are 71 species and two subspecies in the order Syngnathiformes evaluated as data deficient.

==== Syngnathids ====
Species

- Southern little pipehorse (Acentronura australe)
- Briareum pipefish (Apterygocampus epinnulatus)
- Offshore pipefish (Bryx veleronis)
- Muiron Islands pipefish (Choeroichthys latispinosus)
- Back-finned pipefish (Cosmocampus retropinnis)
- Doryichthys heterosoma
- Doryrhamphus aurolineatus
- Narrowstripe pipefish (Doryrhamphus bicarinatus)
- Banded pipefish (Doryrhamphus dactyliophorus)
- Festucalex prolixus
- Big-belly seahorse (Hippocampus abdominalis)
- Hedgehog seahorse (Hippocampus alatus)
- Narrow-bellied seahorse (Hippocampus angustus)
- Bargibant's seahorse (Hippocampus bargibanti)
- Réunion seahorse (Hippocampus borboniensis)
- Knobby seahorse (Hippocampus breviceps)
- Giraffe seahorse (Hippocampus camelopardalis)
- Crowned seahorse (Hippocampus coronatus)
- Denise's pygmy seahorse (Hippocampus denise)
- Fisher's seahorse (Hippocampus fisheri)
- Long-snouted seahorse (Hippocampus guttulatus)
- Eastern spiny seahorse (Hippocampus hendriki)
- Short-snouted seahorse (Hippocampus hippocampus)
- Jayakar's seahorse (Hippocampus jayakari)
- Lichtenstein's seahorse (Hippocampus lichtensteinii)
- Bullneck seahorse (Hippocampus minotaur)
- Japanese seahorse (Hippocampus mohnikei)
- Monte Bello seahorse (Hippocampus montebelloensis)
- Pontoh`s pygmy seahorse (Hippocampus pontohi)
- Slender seahorse (Hippocampus reidi)
- Satomi's pygmy seahorse (Hippocampus satomiae)
- Hippocampus severnsi
- Tiger snout seahorse (Hippocampus subelongatus)
- New Holland seahorse (Hippocampus whitei)
- Zebra seahorse (Hippocampus zebra)
- Dwarf seahorse (Hippocampus zosterae)
- Orange pipefish (Maroubra yasudai)
- Slender pipefish (Microphis caudocarinatus)
- Dumbéa river pipefish (Microphis cruentus)
- Microphis fluviatilis
- Spinach pipefish (Microphis spinachioides)
- West Atlantic pipefish (Minyichthys inusitatus)
- Minyichthys sentus
- Spotted pipefish (Nerophis maculatus)
- Barred xenia-pipefish (Siokunichthys bentuviai)
- Softcoral pipefish (Siokunichthys breviceps)
- Spotted xenia-pipefish (Siokunichthys herrei)
- Southwell's pipefish (Siokunichthys southwelli)
- New Caledonian soft-coral pipefish (Siokunichthys striatus)
- Duncker's pipehorse (Solegnathus dunckeri)
- Hardwicke's pipefish (Solegnathus hardwickii)
- Günther's pipehorse (Solegnathus lettiensis)
- Robust pipehorse (Solegnathus robustus)
- Spiny pipehorse (Solegnathus spinosissimus)
- Alligator pipefish (Syngnathoides biaculeatus)
- Cortez pipefish (Syngnathus carinatus)
- Syngnathus dawsoni
- Chocolate pipefish (Syngnathus euchrous)
- Chain pipefish (Syngnathus louisianae)
- Large-fin pipefish (Syngnathus macrobrachium)
- Hurghada pipefish (Syngnathus macrophthalmus)
- Yucatan pipefish (Syngnathus makaxi)
- Pelagic pipefish (Syngnathus phlegon)
- Black-Sea pelagic pipefish (Syngnathus schmidti)
- Darkflank pipefish (Syngnathus taenionotus)
- Narrow-snouted pipefish (Syngnathus tenuirostris)
- Thickly snouted pipefish (Syngnathus variegatus)

Subspecies

- Subtropical-tropical trunk-pouch pipefish (Microphis brachyurus aculeatus)
- Opossum river pipefish (Microphis brachyurus lineatus)

==== Centriscids ====
- Speckled shrimpfish (Aeoliscus punctulatus)
- Coral shrimpfish (Aeoliscus strigatus)
- Smooth razorfish (Centriscus cristatus)

==== Sea moths ====
- Brick seamoth (Pegasus laternarius)
- Pegasus tetrabelos
- Longtail seamoth (Pegasus volitans)

=== Clupeiformes ===
- Alabama shad (Alosa alabamae)
- Alosa algeriensis
- Longfin Pacific anchovy (Anchoa analis)
- Trinidad anchovy (Anchoa trinitatis)
- Balboa anchovy (Anchoviella balboae)
- Blackburn's anchovy (Anchoviella blackburni)
- Indonesian gizzard shad (Anodontostoma selangkat)
- Toothed river herring (Clupeoides papuensis)
- Smooth-belly pellonuline (Congothrissa gossei)
- White anchovy (Engraulis albidus)
- Pacific menhaden (Ethmidium maculatum)
- Southern Burmese gizzard shad (Gonialosa whiteheadi)
- Venezuelan herring (Jenkinsia parvula)
- Whitehead's sawtooth pellonuline (Potamothrissa whiteheadi)
- Sardinella rouxi
- Sauvagella robusta
- Two-finned round herring (Spratellomorpha bianalis)
- Sanaga pygmy herring (Thrattidion noctivagus)
- Gautama thryssa (Thryssa gautamiensis)
- Freshwater anchovy (Thryssa scratchleyi)

=== Scorpaeniformes ===
There are 57 species and one subspecies in the order Scorpaeniformes evaluated as data deficient.

==== Cottids ====
- Cottus haemusi
- Klamath Lake sculpin (Cottus princeps)
- Cottus transsilvaniae
- Myoxocephalus tuberculatus
- Smallplate sculpin (Stelgistrum beringianum)
- Zesticelus bathybius

==== Scorpaenids ====
- Folgor's scorpionfish (Neomerinthe folgori)
- Helena scorpionfish (Pontinus helena)
- Offshore rockfish (Pontinus kuhlii)
- Scorpaena annobonae
- Scorpaena azorica
- Scorpaena canariensis
- California scorpionfish (Scorpaena guttata)
- African speckled scorpionfish (Scorpaenodes africanus)
- Messina rockfish (Scorpaenodes arenai)
- African large-spotted scorpionfish (Scorpaenodes elongatus)
- Sebastapistes taeniophrys

==== Liparidae ====
- Careproctus aciculipunctatus
- Careproctus cactiformis
- Careproctus herwigi
- Careproctus mederi
- Merret's snailfish (Careproctus merretti)
- Careproctus minimus
- Careproctus pallidus
- Eutelichthys leptochirus
- Paraliparis abyssorum
- Paraliparis atramentatus
- Paraliparis atrolabiatus
- Paraliparis bipolaris
- Wilson's paraliparis (Paraliparis copei)
- Paraliparis hystrix
- Paraliparis kreffti
- Paraliparis megalopus
- Paraliparis murieli
- Paraliparis nigellus
- Longeared snailfish (Paraliparis obliquosus)
- Paraliparis operculosus
- Paraliparis orcadensis
- Paraliparis plagiostomus
- Paraliparis tompkinsae
- Prognatholiparis ptychomandibularis
- Andriashev's dwarf snailfish (Psednos andriashevi)
- Hartel's dwarf snailfish (Psednos harteli)
- Psednos spirohira

==== Other Scorpaeniformes ====
Species

- Pale fortesque (Centropogon latifrons)
- Cottunculus konstantinovi
- Ebinania brephocephala
- Papillose lumpsucker (Eumicrotremus barbatus)
- Lepidotrigla venusta
- Peristedion amblygenys
- Bartail flathead (Platycephalus indicus)
- Prionotus murielae
- Korean rockfish (Sebastes koreanus)
- Sebastes nivosus
- Sebastes peduncularis
- Trigla macrodactylus

Subspecies

- Spiny scorpionfish (Trachyscorpia cristulata echinata)

=== Ophidiiformes ===
- Aphyonus rassi
- Barathronus multidens
- Barathronus parfaiti
- Bassozetus oncerocephalus
- Bathyonus laticeps
- Pacific bearded brotula (Brotula clarkae)
- Bythites islandicus
- Carapus dubius
- Hephthocara simum
- Lamprogrammus shcherbachevi
- Leucobrotula adipata
- Luciobrotula lineata
- Melodichthys hadrocephalus
- Neobythites franzi
- Nybelinella erikssoni
- Mccosker's coralbrotula (Ogilbia mccoskeri)
- Haiti coralbrotula (Ogilbichthys haitiensis)
- Puerto Rico coralbrotula (Ogilbichthys puertoricoensis)
- Tobago coralbrotula (Ogilbichthys tobagoensis)
- Roche's snake blenny (Ophidion rochei)
- Black-nosed brotula (Parasaccogaster melanomycter)
- Parophidion vassali
- Porogadus abyssalis
- Porogadus nudus
- Porogadus subarmatus
- San Blas coralbrotula (Pseudogilbia sanblasensis)
- Sciadonus cryptophthalmus
- Sciadonus jonassoni

=== Tetraodontiformes ===
There are 36 species in the order Tetraodontiformes evaluated as data deficient.

==== Tetraodontids ====
- Arothron carduus
- Banded leopardblowfish (Arothron leopardus)
- Canthigaster criobe
- Canthigaster flavoreticulata
- Canthigaster investigatoris
- Canthigaster punctata
- Dwarf Malabar puffer (Carinotetraodon imitator)
- Plentiful toby (Chelonodon dapsilis)
- Lagocephalus cheesemanii
- Brown-backed toadfish (Lagocephalus gloveri)
- Monotrete palembangensis
- Pelagocephalus coheni
- Sphoeroides andersonianus
- Plaincheek puffer (Sphoeroides georgemilleri)
- Sphoeroides nitidus
- Takifugu basilevskianus
- Takifugu pseudommus
- Takifugu variomaculatus
- Tetraodon duboisi
- Tetraodon implutus
- Tetraodon schoutedeni
- Hick's toadfish (Torquigener hicksi)
- Torquigener marleyi
- Randall's puffer (Torquigener randalli)

==== Filefish species ====
- Acreichthys hajam
- Cantherhines longicaudus
- Cantherhines nukuhiva
- Enigmacanthus filamentosus
- Blue-spotted leatherjacket (Eubalichthys caeruleoguttatus)
- Paramonacanthus matsuurai
- Pervagor marginalis
- Thamnaconus fijiensis
- Blackvent filefish (Thamnaconus melanoproctes)

==== Ostraciids ====
- Island cowfish (Acanthostracion notacanthus)

==== Porcupinefish species ====
- Deepwater burrfish (Allomycterus pilatus)

==== Triggerfishes ====
- Deepwater triggerfish (Rhinecanthus abyssus)

=== Gadiformes ===
There are 32 species in the order Gadiformes evaluated as data deficient.

==== Merlucciids ====
- Merluccius gayi
- Cortez hake (Merluccius hernandezi)

==== Grenadiers species ====
- Bathygadus sulcatus
- Coelorinchus aratrum
- Coelorinchus dorsalis
- Coelorinchus macrolepis
- Coelorinchus notatus
- Coelorinchus sexradiatus
- Coelorinchus shcherbachevi
- Coelorinchus triocellatus
- Coelorinchus velifer
- Coelorinchus weberi
- Coryphaenoides camurus
- Coryphaenoides dubius
- Roughlip grenadier (Coryphaenoides thelestomus)
- Gadomus magnifilis
- Graceful grenadier (Hymenogadus gracilis)
- Kumba dentoni
- Malacocephalus luzonensis
- Sphagemacrurus gibber

==== Morids ====
- Finescale mora (Antimora microlepis)
- Gadella svetovidovi
- Robust cod (Laemonema robustum)
- North Atlantic codling (Lepidion eques)
- Skulpin (Physiculus helenaensis)
- Physiculus maslowskii
- Physiculus microbarbata
- Physiculus parini
- Rhynchogadus hepaticus

==== Lotids ====
- Azores rockling (Gaidropsarus granti)
- Gaidropsarus guttatus

=== Mullets ===
- Goldie river mullet (Cestraeus goldiei)
- Sharp-nosed river mullet (Cestraeus oxyrhyncus)
- Lobed river mullet (Cestraeus plicatilis)
- Diassanga mullet (Liza bandialensis)
- Grooved mullet (Liza dumerili)
- Sicklefin mullet (Liza falcipinnis)
- Largescaled mullet (Liza grandisquamis)
- Persian mullet (Liza persicus)
- Liza tade
- Lebranche mullet (Mugil liza)
- Mugil margaritae

=== Bichirs ===
- Polypterus teugelsi

=== Eels ===
There are 50 eel species evaluated as data deficient.

==== Ophichthids ====
- Snaggle-toothed snake-eel (Aplatophis zorro)
- Apterichtus gracilis
- Emaciated worm eel (Asarcenchelys longimanus)
- Unexpected snake eel (Bascanichthys inopinatus)
- Brachysomophis longipinnis
- Sandy ridgefin eel (Callechelys cliffi)
- Galapagos ridgefin eel (Callechelys galapagensis)
- Ridgefin eel (Callechelys springeri)
- Dalophis multidentatus
- Dalophis obtusirostris
- Ordinary eel (Ethadophis byrnei)
- Snack eel (Ethadophis merenda)
- Pacific horsehair eel (Gordiichthys combibus)
- Irksone eel (Gordiichthys ergodes)
- Hemerorhinus opici
- Ornate snake eel (Herpetoichthys regius)
- Ichthyapus insularis
- Leptenchelys vermiformis
- Acned snake eel (Leuropharus lasiops)
- Thin snake eel (Ophichthus apachus)
- Ophichthus leonensis
- Ophichthus maculatus
- Pisodonophis hypselopterus
- Xyrias guineensis

==== Congrids ====
- Silver eel (Ariosoma mellissii)
- Blackedge conger (Bathycongrus retrotinctus)
- Gnathophis codoniphorus
- White-ring garden eel (Heteroconger canabus)
- Taylor's garden eel (Heteroconger taylori)
- Leptocephalus ophichthoides
- Blackspot conger (Paraconger macrops)
- Promyllantor atlanticus
- Uroconger drachi
- Xenomystax trucidans

==== Other eel species ====
- Highlands long-finned eel (Anguilla interioris)
- Polynesian longfinned eel (Anguilla megastoma)
- Pacific shortfinned eel (Anguilla obscura)
- False moray eel (Catesbya pseudomuraena)
- Mottled false moray (Chlopsis dentatus)
- Kazuko's false moray (Chlopsis kazuko)
- Coloconger japonicus
- Red pike conger (Cynoponticus coniceps)
- Canary moray (Gymnothorax bacalladoi)
- Wide-mouth moray (Gymnothorax eurygnathos)
- Gymnothorax serratidens
- Deepwater arrowtooth eel (Histiobranchus bathybius)
- Red eel (Myroconger compressus)
- Fowler's shortfaced eel (Panturichthys fowleri)
- Many-spotted moray (Uropterygius polystictus)

=== Flatfishes ===
There are 58 species and two subspecies of flatfish evaluated as data deficient.

==== Soleids ====
- Herre's sole (Aseraggodes herrei)
- West coast sole (Austroglossus microlepis)
- Bathysolea lactea
- One-eyed sole (Brachirus sorsogonensis)
- Portuguese sole (Dagetichthys lusitanicus)
- Heteromycteris proboscideus
- Microchirus azevia
- Lusitanian sole (Microchirus boscanion)
- Microchirus frechkopi
- Foureyed sole (Microchirus ocellatus)
- Microchirus theophila
- Monochirus atlanticus
- Mottled sole (Pardachirus poropterus)
- Pegusa cadenati
- Senegalese sole (Solea senegalensis)
- Common sole (Solea solea)
- Stanaland's sole (Solea stanalandi)
- Cyclope sole (Solea triophthalma)
- Klein's sole (Synapturichthys kleinii)
- Narrowbanded sole (Synclidopus macleayanus)
- Vanstraelenia chirophthalma
- Convict zebra sole (Zebrias captivus)
- Zebrias crossolepis

==== Tonguefishes ====
- Nigerian tonguesole (Cynoglossus browni)
- Ghanaian tonguesole (Cynoglossus cadenati)
- Mcculloch's tongue sole (Cynoglossus maccullochi)
- Symphurus lubbocki
- Symphurus reticulatus

==== Paralichthyids ====
Species

- Foureyed flounder (Ancylopsetta kumperae)
- Blunthead whiff (Citharichthys amblybregmatus)
- Big-chinned sanddab (Citharichthys gnathus)
- Mimic sanddab (Citharichthys gordae)
- Etropus delsmani
- Cortez halibut (Paralichthys aestuarius)
- Paralichthys schmitti
- Tropical flounder (Paralichthys tropicus)
- Dappled flounder (Paralichthys woolmani)
- Pseudorhombus binii
- Clearspot flounder (Syacium maculiferum)

Subspecies

- Etropus delsmani delsmani
- Etropus delsmani pacificus

==== Bothids ====
- Brown lefteye flounder (Arnoglossus brunneus)
- Arnoglossus grohmanni
- Scaldback (Arnoglossus kessleri)
- Thor's scaldfish (Arnoglossus thori)
- Guinean flounder (Bothus guibei)
- Chascanopsetta crumenalis
- Laeops cypho
- Laeops kitaharae
- Asaedae flounder (Monolene asaedai)
- Monolene helenensis
- Psettina hainanensis

==== Other flatfish species ====
- Poecilopsetta albomaculata
- Spottail spiny turbot (Psettodes belcheri)
- Spiny turbot (Psettodes bennettii)
- Black flounder (Rhombosolea retiaria)
- Samariscus filipectoralis
- Huysman's righteye flounder (Samariscus huysmani)
- Trinectes hubbsbollinger
- Spottedcheek sole (Trinectes opercularis)

=== Anglerfishes ===
- Caulophryne pelagica
- Coelophrys arca
- Dolopichthys jubatus
- Dolopichthys pullatus
- Gigantactis gracilicauda
- Gigantactis vanhoeffeni
- Gigantactis watermani
- Halieutopsis tumifrons
- Footballfish (Himantolophus albinares)
- Himantolophus brevirostris
- Himantolophus compressus
- Himantolophus macroceras
- Himantolophus macroceratoides
- Himantolophus multifurcatus
- Himantolophus rostratus
- Lasiognathus amphirhamphus
- Leptacanthichthys gracilispinis
- Linophryne maderensis
- Linophryne polypogon
- Linophryne racemifera
- Linophryne sexfilis
- Longspine African angler (Lophiodes kempi)
- Black-bellied angler (Lophius budegassa)
- Oneirodes anisacanthus
- Oneirodes clarkei
- Nightmare dreamer (Oneirodes epithales)
- Oneirodes luetkeni
- Oneirodes myrionemus
- Oneirodes posti
- Rhynchactis macrothrix
- Solocisquama carinata

=== Beryciformes ===
- Red Sea roughy (Hoplostethus marisrubri)
- Metallic roughy (Hoplostethus metallicus)
- Vniro's roughy (Hoplostethus vniro)
- Myripristis formosa
- Tiki soldierfish (Myripristis tiki)
- Ostichthys brachygnathus
- Ostichthys delta
- Ostichthys hypsipterygion
- Ostichthys ovaloculus
- Gulf flashlightfish (Phthanophaneron harveyi)
- Lattice squirrelfish (Sargocentron inaequalis)
- Sargocentron megalops

=== Stephanoberyciformes ===
- Abyssoberyx levisquamosus
- Melamphaes ebelingi
- Melamphaes hubbsi
- Eyebrow bigscale (Melamphaes longivelis)
- Melamphaes polylepis
- Melamphaes pumilus
- Shoulderspine bigscale (Melamphaes suborbitalis)
- Melamphaes typhlops
- Poromitra capito
- Poromitra megalops
- Longjaw bigscale (Scopeloberyx robustus)
- Bean's bigscale (Scopelogadus beanii)

=== Aulopiformes ===
- Bathypterois oddi
- Lestidiops gracilis
- Paraulopus maculatus
- Saurida pseudotumbil
- Stemonosudis bullisi
- Sudis hyalina
- Uncisudis longirostra

=== Zeiformes ===
- Smooth oreo (Pseudocyttus maculatus)
- John Dory (Zeus faber)

=== Stomiiformes ===
- Araiophos eastropas
- Astronesthes gemmifer
- Borostomias abyssorum
- Eustomias acinosus
- Eustomias braueri
- Eustomias contiguus
- Eustomias dinema
- Eustomias insularum
- Eustomias monoclonoides
- Eustomias patulus
- Eustomias polyaster
- Eustomias tenisoni
- Eustomias tetranema
- Manducus maderensis
- Bighead portholefish (Margrethia obtusirostra)

=== Cetomimiformes ===
- Cavernous-peduncle whalefish (Cetomimus compunctus)
- Cetomimus gillii
- Hempels whalefish (Cetomimus hempeli)
- Pink flabby whalefish (Cetostoma regani)
- Young whalefish (Danacetichthys galathenus)
- Doublekeeled whalefish (Ditropichthys storeri)
- Myers whalefish (Gyrinomimus myersi)

=== Myctophiformes ===
- Diaphus dumerilii
- Diaphus subtilis
- Diaphus taaningi
- Lampadena anomala
- Lampadena dea

=== Saccopharyngiformes ===
- Monognathus herringi
- Monognathus jesperseni
- Nigel's one-jawed eel (Monognathus nigeli)
- Monognathus taningi
- Saccopharynx ampullaceus Europe population
- Saccopharynx berteli
- Saccopharynx harrisoni
- Saccopharynx hjorti
- Saccopharynx paucovertebratis
- Saccopharynx trilobatus

== Hagfishes ==
- Eptatretus astrolabium
- Eptatretus bischoffii
- Black hagfish (Eptatretus deani)
- Eptatretus eos
- Eptatretus fernholmi
- Goliath hagfish (Eptatretus goliath)
- Lakeside hagfish (Eptatretus lakeside)
- Lophelia hagfish (Eptatretus lopheliae)
- Shorthead hagfish (Eptatretus mcconnaugheyi)
- Eptatretus minor
- Eptatretus nanii
- Fourteen-gill hagfish (Eptatretus polytrema)
- Eptatretus rubicundus
- Pacific hagfish (Eptatretus stoutii)
- Eptatretus strahani
- Magellan hagfish (Myxine debueni)
- Myxine formosana
- Myxine hubbsoides
- Myxine knappi
- Myxine kuoi
- Dwarf hagfish (Myxine pequenoi)
- Bootlace hagfish (Nemamyxine elongata)
- Slender hagfish (Neomyxine biniplicata)
- Notomyxine tridentiger
- Paramyxine ancon
- Paramyxine atami
- Paramyxine chinensis
- Paramyxine moki
- Paramyxine walkeri
- Paramyxine wayuu

== See also ==
- Lists of IUCN Red List data deficient species
- List of least concern fishes
- List of near threatened fishes
- List of vulnerable fishes
- List of endangered fishes
- List of critically endangered fishes
- List of recently extinct fishes
- Sustainable seafood advisory lists and certification
