= Enteromius mocoensis =

Conservation status
- Data Deficient (IUCN 3.1)

Scientific classification
- Domain: Eukaryota
- Kingdom: Animalia
- Phylum: Chordata
- Class: Actinopterygii
- Order: Cypriniformes
- Family: Cyprinidae
- Subfamily: Smiliogastrinae
- Genus: Enteromius
- Species: E. mocoensis

Binomial name
- Enteromius mocoensis Trewavas, 1936

Synonyms
- Barbus mocoensis Trewavas, 1936

Species of fish

Enteromius mocoensis is a species of ray-finned fish in the genus Enteromius which is endemic to Angola where it occurs in the upper reaches of the Cuvo River and the Kwanza systems.
