= Leuropharus =

Conservation status
- Data Deficient (IUCN 3.1)

Scientific classification
- Kingdom: Animalia
- Phylum: Chordata
- Class: Actinopterygii
- Order: Anguilliformes
- Family: Ophichthidae
- Subfamily: Ophichthinae
- Genus: Leuropharus; Rosenblatt & McCosker, 1970
- Species: L. lasiops

Binomial name
- Leuropharus lasiops Rosenblatt & McCosker, 1970

Species of fish

Leuropharus lasiops, or the acned snake-eel, is a species of eel in the family Ophichthidae. It is the only member of its genus. It is found only in the Pacific Ocean off the coast of Mexico.
