= Poropuntius huangchuchieni =

Conservation status
- Data Deficient (IUCN 3.1)

Scientific classification
- Kingdom: Animalia
- Phylum: Chordata
- Class: Actinopterygii
- Order: Cypriniformes
- Family: Cyprinidae
- Genus: Poropuntius
- Species: P. huangchuchieni

Binomial name
- Poropuntius huangchuchieni (T. L. Tchang, 1962)

Synonyms
- Barbus huangchuchieni T. L. Tchang, 1962; Barbodes huangchuchieni (T. L. Tchang, 1962); Poropuntius angustus Kottelat, 2000

Species of fish

Poropuntius huangchuchieni is a species of ray-finned fish in the genus Poropuntius which is found in the upper Mekong River basin and the Red River basin in the Yunnan. It may also occur in these rivers in Laos and northern Vietnam.
