= Capoeta angorae =

Conservation status
- Data Deficient (IUCN 3.1)

Scientific classification
- Kingdom: Animalia
- Phylum: Chordata
- Class: Actinopterygii
- Order: Cypriniformes
- Family: Cyprinidae
- Subfamily: Barbinae
- Genus: Capoeta
- Species: C. angorae

Binomial name
- Capoeta angorae (Hankó, 1925)

Synonyms
- Varicorhinus angorae Hankó, 1925

Species of fish

Capoeta angorae is a species of freshwater cyprinid fish, which is known from a single specimen caught from Turkey. that was 42 cm (17 in) long. It is also known as the Ankara barb. Not much can be said about its biology, distribution and future therefore. As of 2025 this species has been synonymised with Capoeta damascina.
