= Cirrhinus rubirostris =

Conservation status
- Data Deficient (IUCN 3.1)

Scientific classification
- Kingdom: Animalia
- Phylum: Chordata
- Class: Actinopterygii
- Order: Cypriniformes
- Family: Cyprinidae
- Subfamily: Labeoninae
- Genus: Cirrhinus
- Species: C. rubirostris

Binomial name
- Cirrhinus rubirostris T. R. Roberts, 1997

Species of fish

Cirrhinus rubirostris is a species of cyprinid fish endemic to the Tenasserim River basin in southeastern Myanmar. It grows to 17.2 cm (6.8 in) SL. It is fished for local consumption, and sold on small local markets.
