= Haplochromis toddi =

Conservation status
- Data Deficient (IUCN 3.1)

Scientific classification
- Kingdom: Animalia
- Phylum: Chordata
- Class: Actinopterygii
- Order: Cichliformes
- Family: Cichlidae
- Genus: Haplochromis
- Species: H. toddi

Binomial name
- Haplochromis toddi (Boulenger, 1905)

Synonyms
- Paratilapia toddi

Species of fish

Haplochromis toddi is a small species of fish in the family Cichlidae. It is only known from the type locality of Lusambo, Kasai River. It can reach a length of 15 centimeters (5.9 in).
