= Oxynoemacheilus cinicus =

Conservation status
- Data Deficient (IUCN 3.1)

Scientific classification
- Kingdom: Animalia
- Phylum: Chordata
- Class: Actinopterygii
- Order: Cypriniformes
- Family: Nemacheilidae
- Genus: Oxynoemacheilus
- Species: O. cinicus

Binomial name
- Oxynoemacheilus cinicus (Erk'akan, Nalbant & Özeren, 2007)

Species of fish

Oxynoemacheilus cinicus is a species of Cypriniformes fish in the genus Oxynoemacheilus. It is little known and is most likely from western Anatolia and the Büyük Menderes River.

== Footnotes ==
- Froese, Rainer; Pauly, Daniel (eds.). "Barbatula cinica". FishBase.
