= Yellow barb =

Conservation status
- Least Concern (IUCN 3.1)

Scientific classification
- Kingdom: Animalia
- Phylum: Chordata
- Class: Actinopterygii
- Order: Cypriniformes
- Family: Cyprinidae
- Genus: Enteromius
- Species: E. manicensis

Binomial name
- Enteromius manicensis (Pellegrin, 1919)

Synonyms
- Barbus manicensis Barbus hondeensis

Species of fish

The Yellow barb ( Enteromius manicensis) is a species of cyprinid fish in the genus Enteromius.

== Description ==
The yellow barb is a stout bodied, plain, silvery fish with a yellow tinge and large scales, there are 22-25 scales along the lateral line and 12 around the caudal peduncle. It has two pairs of barbs around the mouth. It reaches a length of 150 mm (5.9 in) SL.

== Habitat ==
Yellow barbs are found in streams in the upper catchment of river basins, usually with rocky stream beds.

== Distribution ==
The yellow barb is widely distributed in the Buzi River system headwaters. Possibly in the adjacent Pungwe River system. It is native to eastern Zimbabwe and western Mozambique. Records of this species from the upper Zambezi, Kafue and Zambian Congo are unconfirmed.

== Status and conservation ==
Populations of the yellow barb are threatened by poisoning of upper catchments by subsistence fishermen and by high sedimentation and mercury pollution caused by gold exploration.
