= Enteromius petchkovskyi =

Conservation status
- Data Deficient (IUCN 3.1)

Scientific classification
- Domain: Eukaryota
- Kingdom: Animalia
- Phylum: Chordata
- Class: Actinopterygii
- Order: Cypriniformes
- Family: Cyprinidae
- Subfamily: Smiliogastrinae
- Genus: Enteromius
- Species: E. petchkovskyi

Binomial name
- Enteromius petchkovskyi Poll, 1967

Synonyms
- Barbus petchkovskyi

Species of fish

Enteromius petchkovskyi is a species of ray-finned fish in the genus Enteromius which is endemic to Angola.

== Footnotes ==
- Froese, Rainer; Pauly, Daniel (eds.). "Enteromius petchkovskyi". FishBase.
