= Gambusia aestiputeus =

Conservation status
- Data Deficient (IUCN 2.3)

Scientific classification
- Kingdom: Animalia
- Phylum: Chordata
- Class: Actinopterygii
- Order: Cyprinodontiformes
- Family: Poeciliidae
- Genus: Gambusia
- Species: G. aestiputeus

Binomial name
- Gambusia aestiputeus Fowler, 1950

Species of fish

Gambusia aestiputeus is a species of fish in the family Poeciliidae. It is endemic to Colombia.
