= Barbus rhinophorus =

Scientific classification
- Kingdom: Animalia
- Phylum: Chordata
- Class: Actinopterygii
- Order: Cypriniformes
- Family: Cyprinidae
- Genus: Barbus
- Species: B. rhinophorus

Binomial name
- Barbus rhinophorus Boulenger, 1910

Species of fish

Barbus rhinophorus is a species of ray-finned fish in the genus Barbus.

== Footnotes ==
- Froese, Rainer; Pauly, Daniel (eds.). "Barbus rhinophorus". FishBase.
