= Leptenchelys =

Conservation status
- Data Deficient (IUCN 3.1)

Scientific classification
- Kingdom: Animalia
- Phylum: Chordata
- Class: Actinopterygii
- Order: Anguilliformes
- Family: Ophichthidae
- Genus: Leptenchelys; G. S. Myers & Wade, 1941
- Species: L. vermiformis

Binomial name
- Leptenchelys vermiformis G. S. Myers & Wade, 1941

Species of fish

Leptenchelys vermiformis, or the slender worm-eel, is a species of eel in the family Ophichthidae. It is the only member of its genus. It is found only in the Pacific Ocean in the vicinity of Costa Rica.
