= Chiloglanis sp. nov. 'Northern Ewaso Nyiro' =

Conservation status
- Data Deficient (IUCN 3.1)

Scientific classification
- Kingdom: Animalia
- Phylum: Chordata
- Class: Actinopterygii
- Order: Siluriformes
- Family: Mochokidae
- Genus: Chiloglanis
- Species: C. sp. nov. 'Northern Ewaso Nyiro'

Binomial name
- Chiloglanis sp. nov. 'Northern Ewaso Nyiro'

Species of fish

Chiloglanis sp. nov. 'Northern Ewaso Nyiro' is a species of fish in the family Mochokidae. It is endemic to Kenya. Its natural habitat is rivers.
