= Garra yiliangensis =

Conservation status
- Data Deficient (IUCN 3.1)

Scientific classification
- Kingdom: Animalia
- Phylum: Chordata
- Class: Actinopterygii
- Order: Cypriniformes
- Family: Cyprinidae
- Subfamily: Labeoninae
- Genus: Garra
- Species: G. yiliangensis

Binomial name
- Garra yiliangensis H. W. Wu & Q. Z. Chen, 1977

Species of fish

Garra yiliangensis is a species of ray-finned fish in the genus Garra from Yunnan in China. The species is known only from the type specimen which was collected in the 1960s from a hill stream in Nan Pan Jiang, Yiliang County, Yunnan Province and was formally described in 1977. It may be a disjunct population of Garra poilanei and more research is needed.
