= Iniistius trivittatus =

Conservation status
- Data Deficient (IUCN 3.1)

Scientific classification
- Kingdom: Animalia
- Phylum: Chordata
- Class: Actinopterygii
- Order: Labriformes
- Family: Labridae
- Genus: Iniistius
- Species: I. trivittatus

Binomial name
- Iniistius trivittatus (J. E. Randall & Cornish, 2000)

Synonyms
- Xyrichtys trivittatus J. E. Randall & Cornish, 2000

Species of fish

Iniistius trivittatus, the three banded razorfish or blue razor wrasse, is a species of marine ray-finned fish from the family Labridae, the wrasses, currently only known from the Pacific waters off Hong Kong and Taiwan. This species inhabits reefs from the surface to 10 m (33 ft) deep. It can reach 30 cm (12 in) in total length.

It is deep bodied and extremely laterally compressed as in all members of its genus. It is distinctively coloured, generally pale yellow with three broad, dark, vertical bars on its body. A further diagnostic trait is the presence of a deep notch between the first two spines of the dorsal fin.
