= Halichoeres raisneri =

Conservation status
- Data Deficient (IUCN 3.1)

Scientific classification
- Kingdom: Animalia
- Phylum: Chordata
- Class: Actinopterygii
- Order: Labriformes
- Family: Labridae
- Genus: Halichoeres
- Species: H. raisneri

Binomial name
- Halichoeres raisneri Baldwin & McCosker, 2001

Synonyms
- Sagittalarva inornata (C. H. Gilbert, 1890)

Species of fish

Halichoeres raisneri is a species of fish of the family Labridae, the wrasses. It was first formally named in 2001. The specific name raisneri is in honor of William R. Raisner Jr., "a veteran pilot who lost his life in a tragic ultralight plane accident on 26 June 1998 during the expedition on which the new species was collected".

== Distribution ==
It is found on the Galápagos Islands.
