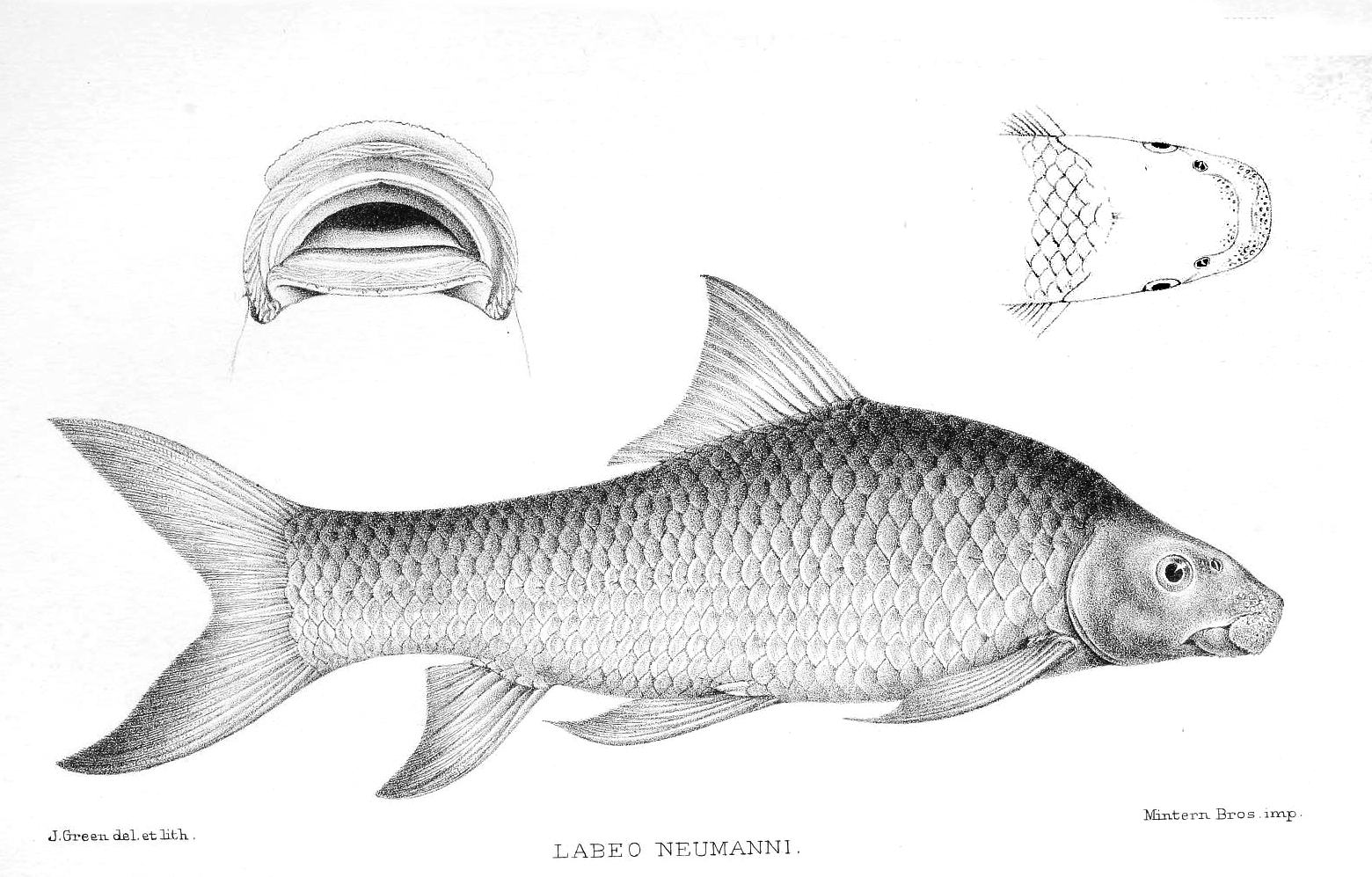

Conservation status
- Data Deficient (IUCN 3.1)

Scientific classification
- Domain: Eukaryota
- Kingdom: Animalia
- Phylum: Chordata
- Class: Actinopterygii
- Order: Cypriniformes
- Family: Cyprinidae
- Subfamily: Labeoninae
- Genus: Labeo
- Species: L. bottegi

Binomial name
- Labeo bottegi Vinciguerra, 1897

Synonyms
- Labeo brunellii Parenzan, 1939; Labeo carnigliae Zolezzi, 1939; Labeo neumanni Boulenger, 1904

= Labeo bottegi =

Species of fish

Labeo bottegi is fish in genus Labeo. It is known from Ethiopia, Kenya, and Somalia.

Named in honor of Italian Army officer Vittorio Bottego (1860-1897), who led expedition to Somalia (1895-1897), during which type specimen was collected.
