= Paratilapia sp. nov. 'Fiamanga' =

Conservation status
- Data Deficient (IUCN 3.1)

Scientific classification
- Kingdom: Animalia
- Phylum: Chordata
- Class: Actinopterygii
- Order: Cichliformes
- Family: Cichlidae
- Subfamily: Paratilapiinae
- Genus: Paratilapia
- Species: P. sp. nov. 'Fiamanga'

Binomial name
- Paratilapia sp. nov. 'Fiamanga'

Species of fish

Paratilapia sp. nov. 'Fiamanga is a species of fish in the family Cichlidae. It is endemic to Madagascar. Its natural habitat is rivers. It is threatened by habitat loss.
