= Poropuntius alloiopleurus =

Conservation status
- Data Deficient (IUCN 3.1)

Scientific classification
- Kingdom: Animalia
- Phylum: Chordata
- Class: Actinopterygii
- Order: Cypriniformes
- Family: Cyprinidae
- Genus: Poropuntius
- Species: P. alloiopleurus

Binomial name
- Poropuntius alloiopleurus (Vaillant, 1893)

Synonyms
- Barbus alloiopleurus Vaillant, 1893; Paraspinibarbus alloiopleurus (Vaillant, 1893); Lissochilus longibarbis V. H. Nguyễn & L. H. Doan, 1969; Barbodes rhomboides H. W. Wu & R. D. Lin, 1977; Lissochilus longibarbis Đ. Y. Mai, 1978; Acrossocheilus xamensis Kottelat, 2000; Acrossocheilus baolacensis V. H. Nguyễn, 2002; Poropuntius baolacensis (V. H. Nguyễn, 2002); Acrossocheilus macrophthalmus V. H. Nguyễn, 2001

Species of fish

Poropuntius alloiopleurus is a species of cyprinid fish that is found in the eastern Asian countries of China, Laos and Vietnam.
