= Poropuntius krempfi =

Conservation status
- Data Deficient (IUCN 3.1)

Scientific classification
- Kingdom: Animalia
- Phylum: Chordata
- Class: Actinopterygii
- Order: Cypriniformes
- Family: Cyprinidae
- Genus: Poropuntius
- Species: P. krempfi

Binomial name
- Poropuntius krempfi (Pellegrin & Chevey, 1934)

Synonyms
- Barbus krempfi Pellegrin & Chevey, 1934; Acrossocheilus krempfi (Pellegrin & Chevey, 1934); Lissochilus krempfi (Pellegrin & Chevey, 1934); Barbus annamensis Pellegrin & Chevey, 1936; Lissochilus annamensis (Pellegrin & Chevey 1936); Hypsibarbus annamensis (Pellegrin & Chevey 1936); Lissochilus macrosquamatus Đ. Y. Mai 1978; Hypsibarbus macrosquamatus (Đ. Y. Mai, 1979)

Species of fish

Poropuntius krempfi is a species of ray-finned fish in the genus Poropuntius from the Red River drainage in Vietnam and Yunnan, and from the Ma River drainage in Vietnam and Laos.

== Etymology ==
The fish is named in honor of French marine biologist Armand Krempf (1879–?), it was he who supplied the Muséum national d'Histoire naturelle (Paris) with many specimens from Indo-China.
