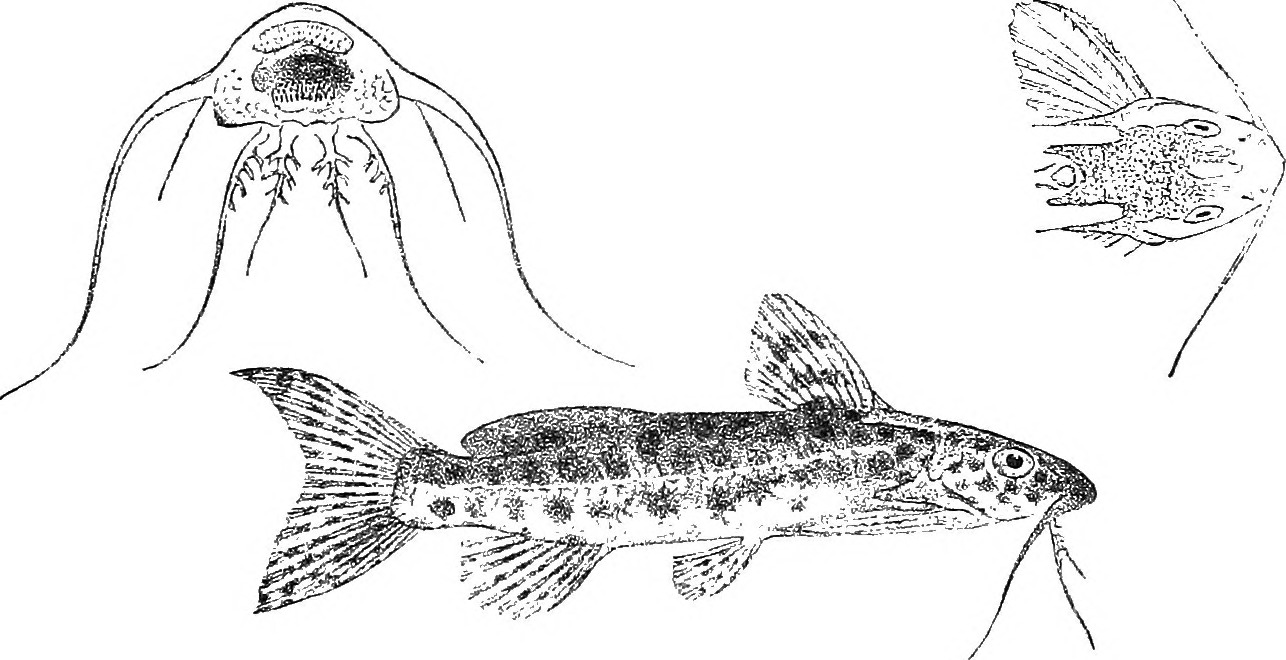

Conservation status
- Data Deficient (IUCN 3.1)

Scientific classification
- Kingdom: Animalia
- Phylum: Chordata
- Class: Actinopterygii
- Order: Siluriformes
- Family: Mochokidae
- Genus: Synodontis
- Species: S. multimaculatus

Binomial name
- Synodontis multimaculatus Boulenger, 1902

= Synodontis multimaculatus =

Species of fish

Synodontis multimaculatus, known as the dotted synodontis, is a species of upside-down catfish that is native to the Democratic Republic of the Congo where it is found in the Ubangi River. It was first described by British-Belgian zoologist George Albert Boulenger in 1902, from a specimen collected in the Ubangi River in Mobayi-Mbongo, the Democratic Republic of the Congo. The species name multimaculatus is derived from the word multi, meaning many, and the Latin word maculatus, meaning spots, referring to the many spots on the fish.

== Description ==
Like all members of the genus Synodontis, S. multimaculatus has a strong, bony head capsule that extends back as far as the first spine of the dorsal fin. The head contains a distinct narrow, bony, external protrusion called a humeral process. The shape and size of the humeral process helps to identify the species. In S. multimaculatus, the humeral process is narrow, pointed, and rough, with a distinct ridge on the underside.

The fish has three pairs of barbels. The maxillary barbels are on located on the upper jaw, and two pairs of mandibular barbels are on the lower jaw. The maxillary barbel is long and straight without any branches, without a membrane at the base. It extends about the length of the head. The outer pair of mandibular barbels is about twice the length of the inner pair, and both pairs have short, stiff branches near the base.

The front edges of the dorsal fins and the pectoral fins of Syntontis species are hardened into stiff spines. In S. multimaculatus, the spine of the dorsal fin is slightly shorter than the head, smooth in the front and serrated on the back. The remaining portion of the dorsal fin is made up of seven branching rays. The spine of the pectoral fin a little longer than the dorsal spine, and serrated on both sides. The adipose fin is 4 times as long as it is deep. The anal fin contains four unbranched and seven branched rays. The tail, or caudal fin, is moderately forked.

All members of Syndontis have a structure called a premaxillary toothpad, which is located on the very front of the upper jaw of the mouth. This structure contains several rows of short, chisel-shaped teeth. In S. multimaculatus, the toothpad forms a short and broad band. On the lower jaw, or mandible, the teeth of Syndontis are attached to flexible, stalk-like structures and described as "s-shaped" or "hooked". The number of teeth on the mandible is used to differentiate between species; in S. multimaculatus, there are about 30 teeth on the mandible.

The body color is brown, with large, darker round spots. Smaller spots appear on the ventral, anal, and caudal fins. Large spots appear on the dorsal fin.

The maximum standard length of the species is 6.4 centimetres (2.5 in). Generally, females in the genus Synodontis tend to be slightly larger than males of the same age.

== Habitat and behavior ==
In the wild, the species has been found only in the area of Mobayi-Mbongo in the Ubangi River. It inhabits muddy bottoms down to at least 100 metres (330 ft) in lakes. The reproductive habits of most of the species of Synodontis are not known, beyond some instances of obtaining egg counts from gravid females. Spawning likely occurs during the flooding season between July and October, and pairs swim in unison during spawning. As a whole, species of Synodontis are omnivores, consuming insect larvae, algae, gastropods, bivalves, sponges, crustaceans, and the eggs of other fishes. The growth rate is rapid in the first year, then slows down as the fish age.
