= Hemiculter songhongensis =

Conservation status
- Data Deficient (IUCN 3.1)

Scientific classification
- Kingdom: Animalia
- Phylum: Chordata
- Class: Actinopterygii
- Division: Teleostei
- Order: Cypriniformes
- Suborder: Cyprinoidei
- Family: Xenocyprididae
- Genus: Hemiculter
- Species: H. songhongensis

Binomial name
- Hemiculter songhongensis V. H. Nguyễn & Nguyen, 2001

Species of fish

Hemiculter songhongensis is a species inquirenda of freshwater ray-finned fish which may belong to the genus Hemiculter.
