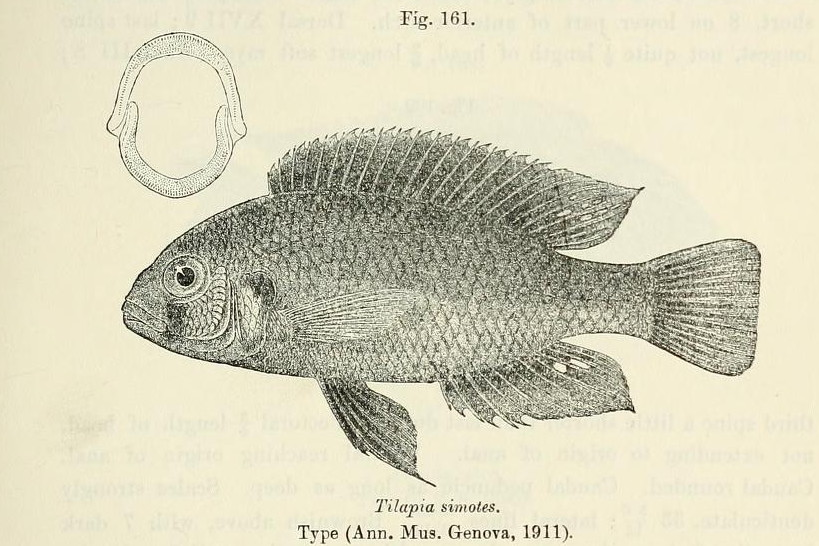

Conservation status
- Data Deficient (IUCN 3.1)

Scientific classification
- Kingdom: Animalia
- Phylum: Chordata
- Class: Actinopterygii
- Order: Cichliformes
- Family: Cichlidae
- Genus: Haplochromis
- Species: H. simotes

Binomial name
- Haplochromis simotes (Boulenger, 1911)

Synonyms
- Tilapia simotes Boulenger, 1911; Neochromis simotes (Boulenger, 1911)

= Haplochromis simotes =

Species of fish

Haplochromis simotes is a species of cichlid endemic to the Victorian Nile where it is only known with certainty from Kakindu and questionable records from Ripon Falls, both in Uganda. This species can reach a standard length of 8.7 cm (3.4 in). This algae-feeder (leading to comparisons with Tropheus) is found in fast-flowing waters over a rocky bottom. Although rated as data deficient by the IUCN, its range is very small and it could easily become extinct as a result of already-planned dams.
