= Enteromius tetraspilus =

Conservation status
- Data Deficient (IUCN 3.1)

Scientific classification
- Domain: Eukaryota
- Kingdom: Animalia
- Phylum: Chordata
- Class: Actinopterygii
- Order: Cypriniformes
- Family: Cyprinidae
- Subfamily: Smiliogastrinae
- Genus: Enteromius
- Species: E. tetraspilus

Binomial name
- Enteromius tetraspilus (Pfeffer, 1896)

Synonyms
- Barbus tetraspilus

Species of fish

Enteromius tetraspilus is a species of cyprinid fish in the genus Enteromius. It is endemic to the Democratic republic of the Congo.

== Footnotes ==
- Froese, Rainer; Pauly, Daniel (eds.). "Enteromius tetraspilus". FishBase.
