= Barilius radiolatus =

Conservation status
- Data Deficient (IUCN 3.1)

Scientific classification
- Domain: Eukaryota
- Kingdom: Animalia
- Phylum: Chordata
- Class: Actinopterygii
- Order: Cypriniformes
- Family: Danionidae
- Genus: Barilius
- Species: B. radiolatus

Binomial name
- Barilius radiolatus Günther, 1868

Species of fish

Barilius radiolatus, or the Gunther's baril, is a freshwater fish in the family Cyprinidae. It is found in India and Nepal, although the latter may represent introductions. It inhabits clear, gravelly streams and grows to 10 cm (3.9 in) TL. Barilius nelsoni might be its junior synonym.
