= Enteromius tongaensis =

Conservation status
- Data Deficient (IUCN 3.1)

Scientific classification
- Domain: Eukaryota
- Kingdom: Animalia
- Phylum: Chordata
- Class: Actinopterygii
- Order: Cypriniformes
- Family: Cyprinidae
- Subfamily: Smiliogastrinae
- Genus: Enteromius
- Species: E. tongaensis

Binomial name
- Enteromius tongaensis (Rendahl (de), 1935)

Synonyms
- Barbus tongaensis

Species of fish

Enteromius tongaensis is a species of ray-finned fish in the genus Enteromius which has been recorded from a single location on the White Nile in South Sudan.

== Footnotes ==
- Froese, Rainer; Pauly, Daniel (eds.). "Enteromius tongaensis". FishBase.
