= Oxynoemacheilus lenkoranensis =

Conservation status
- Data Deficient (IUCN 3.1)

Scientific classification
- Kingdom: Animalia
- Phylum: Chordata
- Class: Actinopterygii
- Order: Cypriniformes
- Family: Nemacheilidae
- Genus: Oxynoemacheilus
- Species: O. lenkoranensis

Binomial name
- Oxynoemacheilus lenkoranensis (Abdurakhmanov, 1962)

Synonyms
- Nemacheilus angorae lenkoranensis Abdurakhmanov, 1962; Nemacheilus angorae alasanicus Elanidze, 1983

Species of fish

Oxynoemacheilus lenkoranensis, the Lenkoran loach, is a species of stone loach from the Lenkoran river drainage in Azerbaijan.
