= Schistura orthocauda =

Scientific classification
- Kingdom: Animalia
- Phylum: Chordata
- Class: Actinopterygii
- Order: Cypriniformes
- Family: Nemacheilidae
- Genus: Schistura
- Species: S. orthocauda

Binomial name
- Schistura orthocauda (Đ. Y. Mai, 1978)

Synonyms
- Barbatula orthocauda Mai, 1978

Species of fish

Schistura orthocauda is a species of ray-finned fish, a stone loach, in the genus Schistura from Vietnam.
