= Henicorhynchus inornatus =

Conservation status
- Data Deficient (IUCN 3.1)

Scientific classification
- Kingdom: Animalia
- Phylum: Chordata
- Class: Actinopterygii
- Order: Cypriniformes
- Family: Cyprinidae
- Subfamily: Labeoninae
- Genus: Henicorhynchus
- Species: H. inornatus

Binomial name
- Henicorhynchus inornatus (T. R. Roberts, 1997)

Synonyms
- Gymnostomus inornatus (Roberts, 1997); Cirrhinus inornatus Roberts, 1997

Species of fish

Henicorhynchus inornatus is a species of ray-finned fish in the genus Henicorhynchus, although some authorities classify it as member of the genus Cirrhinus. It is only found in the Irrawaddy and Sittang basins in Myanmar.
