= Tylognathus =

Genus of fishes

Tylognathus is an invalid genus of ray-finned fishes in the family Cyprinidae. It was established by Heckel in 1843 without a type species. Varicorhinus diplostomus, described by Heckel in 1838 and erroneously redescribed by the same author in 1844 as T. valenciennesii, was later designated the type species. Today this fish is placed in the genus Bangana.

The members of this polyphyletic assemblage mainly belong to the group which is known as the subfamily Labeoninae to some authors and the tribe Labeonini of subfamily Cyprininae by others.

The taxa formerly placed in Tylognathus are:

- Tylognathus ariza (Hamilton, 1807) is now Bangana ariza
- Tylognathus barbatulus Heckel, 1844 is now Crossocheilus diplochilus
- Tylognathus bo Popta, 1904 is now Lobocheilos bo
- Tylognathus boides Popta, 1906 is now Lobocheilos bo
- Tylognathus brunneus Fowler, 1934 is now Henicorhynchus siamensis
- Tylognathus cantini Sauvage, 1882 is now Labeo cylindricus
- Tylognathus caudimaculatus Fowler, 1934 is now Cirrhinus caudimaculatus
- Tylognathus coatesi Fowler, 1937 is now Crossocheilus reticulatus
- Tylognathus davidi Sauvage, 1878 is now Sarcocheilichthys davidi
- Tylognathus davisi Fowler, 1937 is now Lobocheilos davisi
- Tylognathus delacouri Pellegrin & Fang, 1940 is now Lobocheilos delacouri
- Tylognathus elegans Günther, 1868 is now Hemigrammocapoeta elegans
- Tylognathus falcifer (Valenciennes, 1842) is now Lobocheilos falcifer
- Tylognathus festai (Tortonese, 1939) is now Garra festai
- Tylognathus fowleri Pellegrin & Chevey, 1936 is now Lobocheilos fowleri
- Tylognathus gedrosicus (Zugmayer, 1912) is now Labeo gedrosicus
- Tylognathus gracilis Fowler, 1937 is now Lobocheilos gracilis
- Tylognathus heterorhynchus (Bleeker, 1853) is now Schismatorhynchos heterorhynchos
- Tylognathus hispidus (Valenciennes, 1842) is now Lobocheilos falcifer
- Tylognathus kajanensis Popta, 1904 is now Lobocheilos kajanensis
- Tylognathus klatti (Kosswig, 1950) is now Crossocheilus klatti or part of Hemigrammocapoeta
- Tylognathus lehat (Bleeker, 1858) is now Lobocheilos lehat
- Tylognathus melanotaenia Fowler, 1935 is now Lobocheilos melanotaenia
- Tylognathus montanus Günther, 1889 is now Labeo cylindricus
- Tylognathus nanus is now Hemigrammocapoeta nana
- Tylognathus porcellus Heckel, 1844 is now Labeo porcellus
- Tylognathus quadrilineatus Fowler, 1935 is now Lobocheilos quadrilineatus
- Tylognathus rhabdoura Fowler, 1934 is now Lobocheilos rhabdoura
- Tylognathus schwanenfeldii (Bleeker, 1853) is now Lobocheilos schwanenfeldii
- Tylognathus siamensis de Beaufort, 1927 is now Henicorhynchus siamensis
- Tylognathus sinensis Kner, 1867 is now Abbottina rivularis
- Tylognathus steinitziorum is now Hemigrammocapoeta nana
- Tylognathus striolatus Günther, 1868 is now Labeo boggut
- Tylognathus trangensis Fowler, 1939 is now Lobocheilos trangensis
- Tylognathus valenciennesii Heckel, 1844 is now Bangana diplostoma
