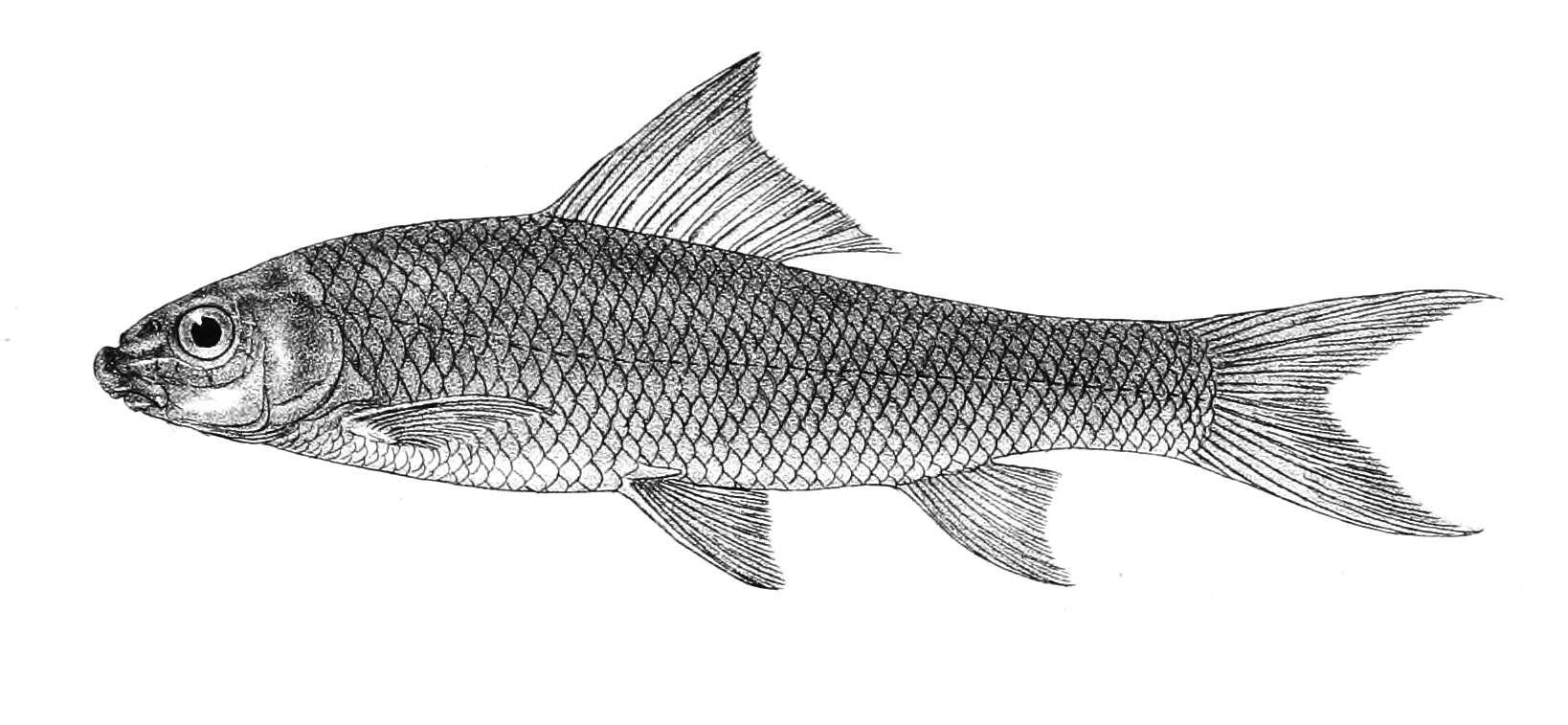
- Bangana diplostoma

Scientific classification
- Kingdom: Animalia
- Phylum: Chordata
- Class: Actinopterygii
- Order: Cypriniformes
- Family: Cyprinidae
- Subfamily: Labeoninae
- Genus: Bangana; Hamilton, 1822

Type species
- Cyprinus dero Hamilton, 1822

Species
- (see text)

Synonyms
- Nukta Hora, 1942; Rohitodes Bleeker, 1860; Tylognathus Heckel, 1843

= Bangana =

Genus of fishes

Bangana is a genus of fish in the family Cyprinidae, the carps and minnows. It is distributed across much of southern and eastern Asia. Species live mainly in the flowing waters of tropical and subtropical rivers.

== Taxonomy ==
Bangana includes many species formerly classified in the genus Sinilabeo. A number of species often placed in Bangana have again been moved to other genera, notably Altigena, Gymnostomus, Incisilabeo, Speolabeo and Decorus, but to what extent these changes are recognized varies.

=== Species ===
Bangana contains the following valid species:

- Bangana almorae (B. L. Chaudhuri, 1912)
- Bangana brevirostris K. Liu & W. Zhou, 2009
- Bangana dero (Hamilton, 1822) (kalabans)
- Bangana devdevi (Hora, 1936)
- Bangana diplostoma (Heckel, 1838)
- Bangana gedrosicus (Zugmayer, 1912)
- Bangana nukta (Sykes, 1839) (Nukta)

B. joalius (Hamilton, 1822) is a Species inquirenda within this genus.

=== Phylogeny ===
The following maximum likelihood phylogenetic tree is based on a dataset of nuclear and mitochondrial DNA, from Yang et al. 2012, with updated binomial names:

- Labeoina
  - Gymnostomus ariza
  - - - Incisilabeo behri
      - Bangana sensu stricto
        - - "Labeo" bata var.
          - Bangana nukta
        - - Bangana sp. Salween
          - - Labeo bata
            - - Bangana dero
              - Labeo boggut
    - - Cirrhinus cirrhosus
      - - Cirrhinus microlepis
        - Labeo sensu stricto

"Bangana" tonkinensis and "B." lemassoni were recovered in a more derived position than Bangana sensu stricto, the two were recovered within the same clade as Discogobio and Pseudocrossocheilus, so they were subsequently reassigned to new genera.
