= Bang Pla Soi =

Bang Pla Soi บางปลาสร้อย
- Tambon
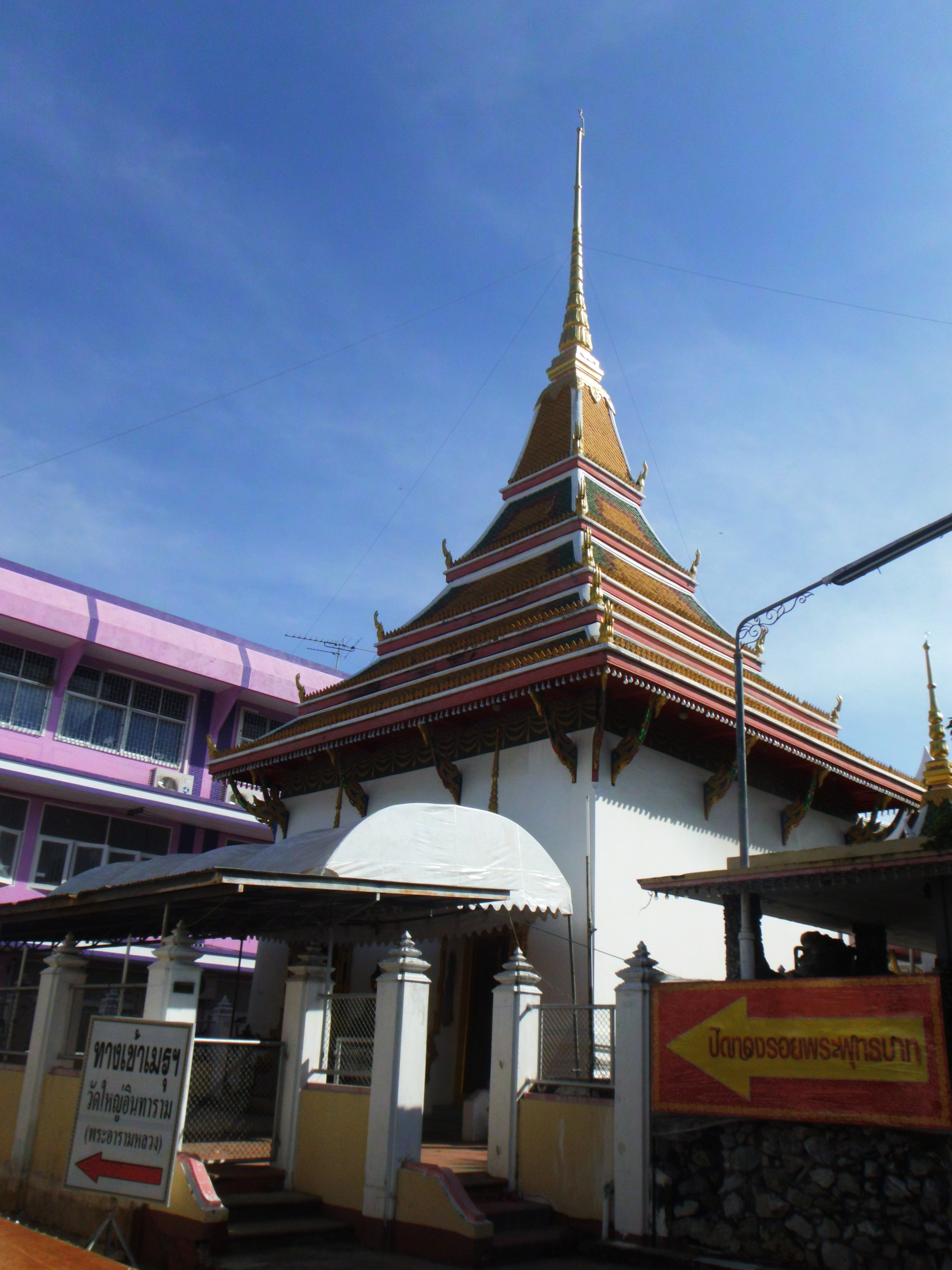
- Wat Yai Intharam

- Location in Chonburi province Bang Pla Soi (Thailand)
- Coordinates: 13°22′10.69″N 100°59′0.09″E
- Country: Thailand
- Province: Chonburi
- District: Mueang Chonburi
- Time zone: UTC+7 (ICT)

Bang Pla Soi (Thai: บางปลาสร้อย, pronounced [bāːŋ plāː sɔ̂j]) is a tambon (sub-district) of Mueang Chonburi district, Chonburi province, eastern Thailand. Bang Pla Soi can be regarded as downtown Chonburi, due to it being the location of various important buildings such as the Provincial Hall, the Provincial Court, etc.

== Name ==
Its name "Bang Pla Soi" translates to "place of pla soi". "Pla soi" is a Thai common name for small edible freshwater fish in the carp family (Cyprinidae), similar to minnow distributed in many genera such as Cirrhinus, Henicorhynchus, Labiobarbus, Lobocheilus, etc.

It got its name from a khlong (canal) that flows through an area rich in this species of fish.

While the Chinese call the sub-district in Teochew as 萬佛歲; Bān-pu̍t-sòe, which means "a place full of fish".

In the past, Bang Pla Soi was also the name used to refer to the entire downtown Chonburi.

== History ==
The area has been an important trading location on the eastern coastline since ancient times, it was notable for its location in the centre of the ocean trading route between India and ancient civilizations like Greeks, Romans and Arabs as well as ancient China, and an abundance of natural resources including plants and herbs. Bang Pla Soi was also located near other important cities such as Phaya Re, an important trading post for forest products and wood; Phra Rot, where the products were sent at the internal harbour; and finally coastal Sri Phalo where they were exported. Trade continued in this manner until the Ayutthaya period, sometime around the 13th–14th century, when the main coastal trading hub was relocated to Bang Pla Soi. When sediment made parts of the Bang Pakong river shallower, the coastal settlement of Sri Phalo experienced a decline in its importance and economy during the 1300s. As a result, some of the town's residence moved to Bang Pla Soi. Evidence of the prosperity of Bang Pla Soi that can still be seen is Wat Yai Intharam, an ancient Buddhist house of worship built since the late Ayutthaya period, with an ordination hall shaped like a junk's curve.

During the King Rama III's reign in the early Rattanakosin period, many Chinese immigrated to settle in Bang Pla Soi, making this place more lively and important. According to the records of the French missionary Jean-Baptiste Pallegoix in 1854, Bang Pla Soi was a community of about 6,000 Thai and Chinese people.

Eventually, Bang Pla Soi, Bang Phra and Bang Lamung districts formed the current Chonburi province.

In 1915, the Governor of Chonburi Praya Prasaisuradach founded Chonkanyanukoon School, which opened in 1917 as a co-ed school. However, the Ministry of Education forced the school to split into single sex schools in 1931.

== Geography ==
Bang Pla Soi borders Ban Suan to the east and to the south, Bay of Bangkok (upper Gulf of Thailand) to the west and Makham Yong to the north.

== Administration ==
The entire area of Bang Pla Soi is administered by the Chonburi City Municipality.
