= Hora white carp =

Scientific classification
- Kingdom: Animalia
- Phylum: Chordata
- Class: Actinopterygii
- Order: Cypriniformes
- Family: Cyprinidae
- Subfamily: Labeoninae
- Genus: Cirrhinus
- Species: C. macrops

Binomial name
- Cirrhinus macrops Steindachner, 1870

Species of fish

Hora white carp (Cirrhinus macrops) is a species of ray-finned fish in the genus Cirrhinus from India. Some authorities regard it as a synonym of Cirrhinus mrigala.

== Footnotes ==
- Froese, Rainer; Pauly, Daniel (eds.). "Cirrhinus macrops". FishBase.
