= Gymnostomus horai =

Conservation status
- Endangered (IUCN 3.1)

Scientific classification
- Kingdom: Animalia
- Phylum: Chordata
- Class: Actinopterygii
- Order: Cypriniformes
- Family: Cyprinidae
- Subfamily: Labeoninae
- Genus: Gymnostomus
- Species: G. horai

Binomial name
- Gymnostomus horai (Bănărescu, 1986)

Synonyms
- Bangana horai; Cirrhina latia; Cirrhinus lu; Crossocheilus horai; Gymnostomus horai

Species of fish

Gymnostomus horai is a species of cyprinid fish endemic to Inle Lake in Myanmar.
