= Lobocheilos ovalis =

Conservation status
- Least Concern (IUCN 3.1)

Scientific classification
- Kingdom: Animalia
- Phylum: Chordata
- Class: Actinopterygii
- Order: Cypriniformes
- Family: Cyprinidae
- Genus: Lobocheilos
- Species: L. ovalis

Binomial name
- Lobocheilos ovalis Kottelat & H. H. Tan, 2008

Species of fish

Lobocheilos ovalis is a species of freshwater ray-finned fish belonging to the family Cyprinidae, the family which includes the carps, barbs, minnows and related fishes. This species is endemic to northern Borneo where it is found in Sabah and Sarawak in East Malaysia, as well as in Brunei.
