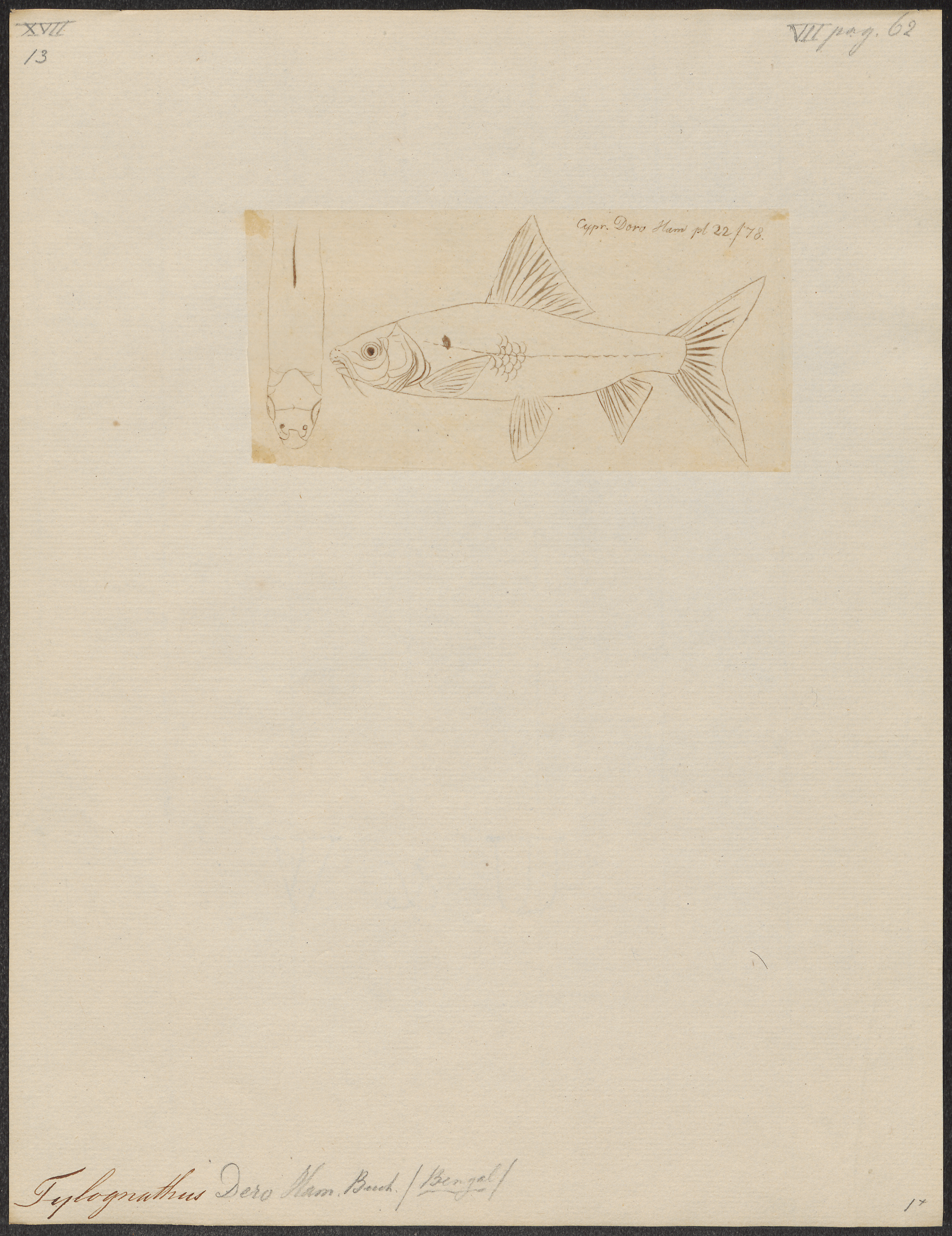

Conservation status
- Least Concern (IUCN 3.1)

Scientific classification
- Kingdom: Animalia
- Phylum: Chordata
- Class: Actinopterygii
- Order: Cypriniformes
- Family: Cyprinidae
- Subfamily: Labeoninae
- Genus: Bangana
- Species: B. dero

Binomial name
- Bangana dero (Hamilton, 1822)

Synonyms
- Cyprinus dero Hamilton, 1822; Sinilabeo dero (Hamilton 1822); Labeo dero (Hamilton 1822); Cyprinus (Bengana) falcata Gray, 1832; Gobio malacostomus McClelland, 1839; Cirrhina sindenensis Day, 1872; Labeo sindensis (Day 1872); Labeo rilli B. L. Chaudhuri, 1912; Labeo henshawi Fowler, 1924

= Kalabans =

Species of fish

The kalabans (Bangana dero) is a species of cyprinid fish found in streams in the Himalayan foothills in India, Nepal, and China. It is also found in Bangladesh.

The species is sexually dimorphic with males developing nuptial tubercles.
