= Lobocheilos tenura =

Conservation status
- Least Concern (IUCN 3.1)

Scientific classification
- Kingdom: Animalia
- Phylum: Chordata
- Class: Actinopterygii
- Order: Cypriniformes
- Family: Cyprinidae
- Genus: Lobocheilos
- Species: L. tenura

Binomial name
- Lobocheilos tenura Kottelat & H. H. Tan, 2008

Species of fish

Lobocheilos tenura is a species of freshwater ray-finned fish belonging to the family Cyprinidae, the family which includes the carps, barbs, minnows and related fishes. This species is endemic to the upper parts of the Kapuas system in West Kalimantan in Indonesian Borneo. This species is found in clear water of gravel and rock riverbeds. The maximum published standard length of this fish is 14 cm (5.5 in).
