= Lobocheilos erinaceus =

Conservation status
- Near Threatened (IUCN 3.1)

Scientific classification
- Kingdom: Animalia
- Phylum: Chordata
- Class: Actinopterygii
- Order: Cypriniformes
- Family: Cyprinidae
- Genus: Lobocheilos
- Species: L. erinaceus

Binomial name
- Lobocheilos erinaceus Kottelat & H. H. Tan, 2008

Species of fish

Lobocheilos erinaceus is a species of freshwater ray-finned fish belonging to the family Cyprinidae, the family which includes the carps, barbs, minnows and related fishes. This species is endemic to Borneo where it is found in the Danum Valley in Eastern Malaysia.This species has a maximum published length of 14.3 centimetres (5.6 in).
