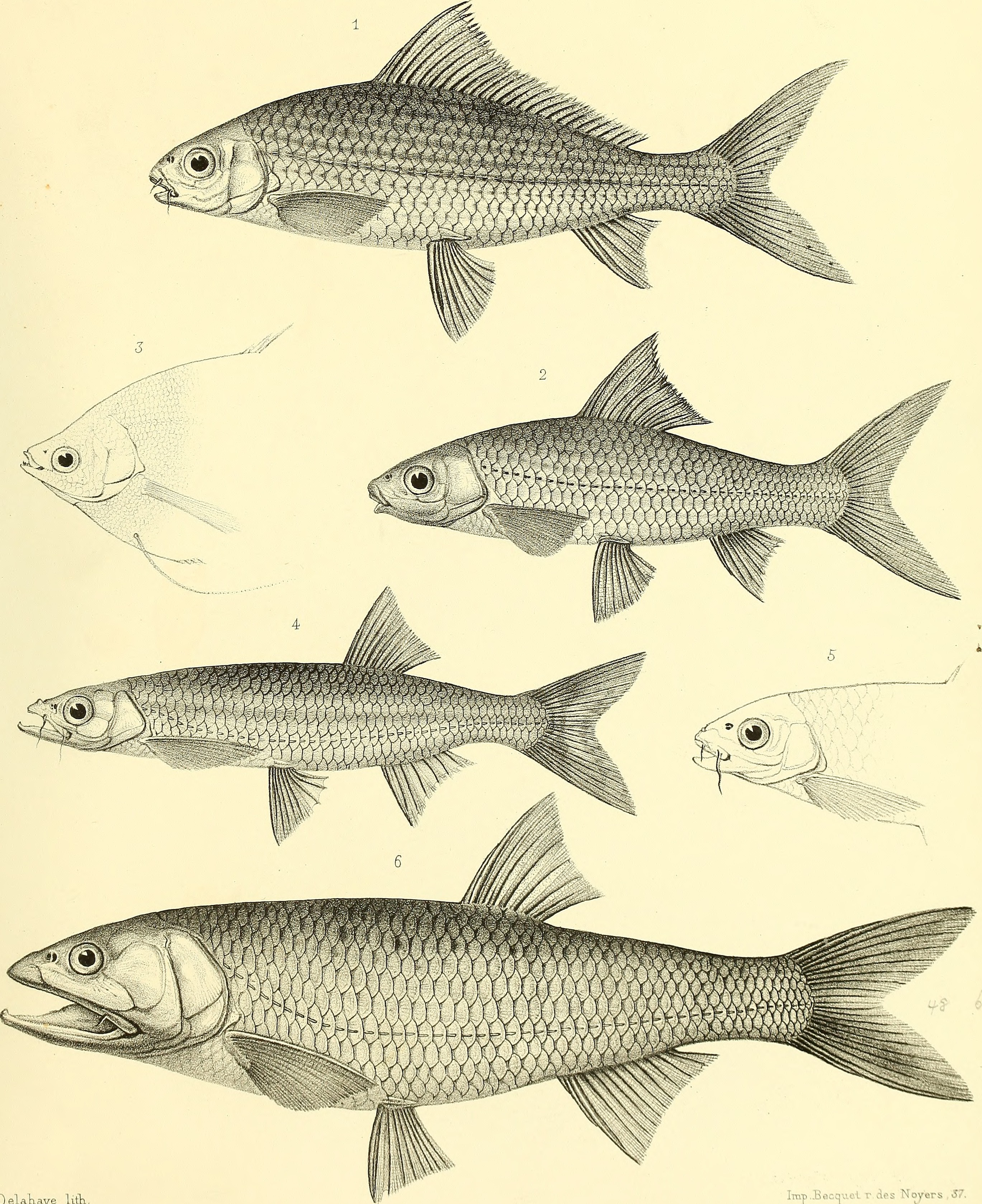
- 2 = Cirrhinus jullieni

Conservation status
- Data Deficient (IUCN 3.1)

Scientific classification
- Kingdom: Animalia
- Phylum: Chordata
- Class: Actinopterygii
- Order: Cypriniformes
- Family: Cyprinidae
- Subfamily: Labeoninae
- Genus: Cirrhinus
- Species: C. jullieni

Binomial name
- Cirrhinus jullieni Sauvage, 1878

Synonyms
- Rohita sima Sauvage, 1881

= Cirrhinus jullieni =

Species of fish

Cirrhinus jullieni is a species of ray-finned fish in the genus Cirrhinus. Many authorities regard C. jullieni as a synonym of Cirrhinus molitorella.
