= Lobocheilos ixocheilos =

Conservation status
- Least Concern (IUCN 3.1)

Scientific classification
- Kingdom: Animalia
- Phylum: Chordata
- Class: Actinopterygii
- Order: Cypriniformes
- Family: Cyprinidae
- Genus: Lobocheilos
- Species: L. ixocheilos

Binomial name
- Lobocheilos ixocheilos Kottelat & H. H. Tan, 2008

Species of fish

Lobocheilos ixocheilos is a species of freshwater ray-finned fish belonging to the family Cyprinidae, the family which includes the carps, barbs, minnows and related fishes. This species is endemic to Borneo and Sumatra.
