= Bangana brevirostris =

Scientific classification
- Domain: Eukaryota
- Kingdom: Animalia
- Phylum: Chordata
- Class: Actinopterygii
- Order: Cypriniformes
- Family: Cyprinidae
- Subfamily: Labeoninae
- Genus: Bangana
- Species: B. brevirostris

Binomial name
- Bangana brevirostris K. Liu & W. Zhou, 2009

Species of fish

Bangana brevirostris is a species of cyprinid fish endemic to China.
