= Khlong Tamru subdistrict =

Khlong Tamru คลองตำหรุ
- Tambon
- Interactive map of Khlong Tamru
- Coordinates: 13°26′16″N 100°59′29″E
- Country: Thailand
- Province: Chon Buri
- Amphoe: Mueang Chon Buri

Population (2018)
  - Total: 8,050
- Time zone: UTC+7 (TST)
- Postal code: 20000
- TIS 1099: 200112

Khlong Tamru (Thai: คลองตำหรุ, pronounced [kʰlɔ̄ːŋ tām.rùʔ]) is a tambon (subdistrict) of Mueang Chon Buri District, in Chon Buri Province, Thailand. In 2018 it had a total population of 8,050 people.

== Administration ==
=== Central administration ===
The tambon is subdivided into 6 administrative villages (muban).

No.	Name	Thai
1.	Ban Na Kluea	บ้านนาเกลือ
2.	Ban Lang	บ้านล่าง
3.	Ban Klang Nuea	บ้านกลางเหนือ
4.	Ban Klang	บ้านกลาง
5.	Ban Bon	บ้านบน
6.	Ban Pak Khlong	บ้านปากคลอง

=== Local administration ===
The area of the subdistrict is shared by 2 local governments.

- the subdistrict municipality (Thesaban Tambon) Khlong Tamru (เทศบาลตำบลคลองตำหรุ)
- the subdistrict administrative organization (SAO) Khlong Tamru (องค์การบริหารส่วนตำบลคลองตำหรุ)
