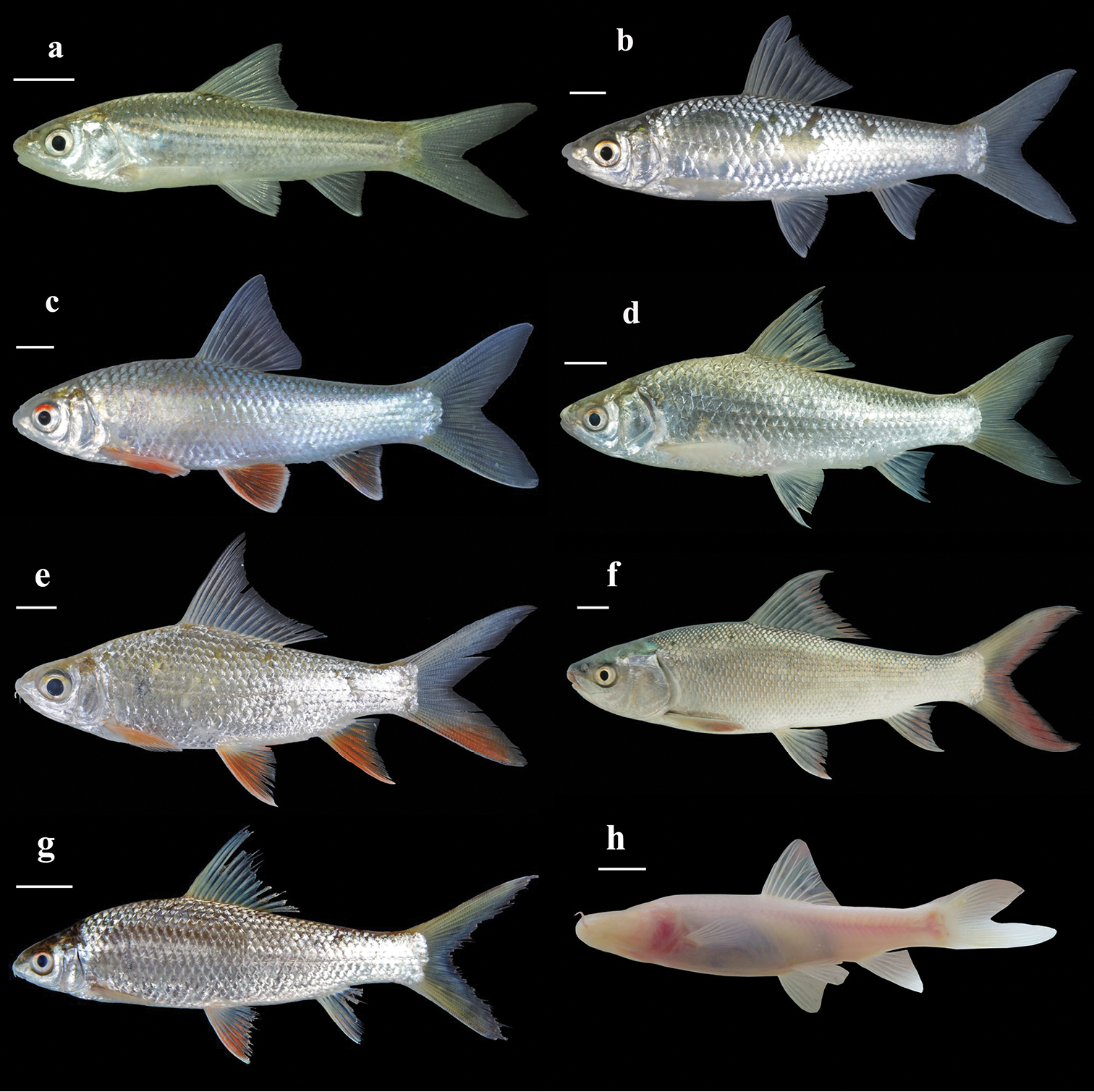
- Various Henicorhynchus sp. (a-d in image)

Scientific classification
- Kingdom: Animalia
- Phylum: Chordata
- Class: Actinopterygii
- Order: Cypriniformes
- Family: Cyprinidae
- Subfamily: Labeoninae
- Genus: Henicorhynchus; H. M. Smith, 1945

Type species
- Henicorhynchus lobatus H. M. Smith, 1945

= Henicorhynchus =

Genus of fishes

Henicorhynchus is a genus of cyprinid fish that occurs in Southeast Asia (Thailand, Cambodia, Laos and Vietnam). In the Delta region of Vietnam, the fish is fermented and used as an ingredient in bún mắm, a type of soup/stew.

== Species ==
Henicorhynchus contains the following species:

- Henicorhynchus caudiguttatus (Fowler, 1934) (Spotted mud carp)
- Henicorhynchus caudimaculatus (Fowler, 1934) (Striped mud carp)
- Henicorhynchus entmema (Fowler, 1934) (Notched mud carp)
- Henicorhynchus ornatipinnis (Roberts, 1997) (Red finned mud carp)
- Henicorhynchus siamensis (Sauvage, 1881) (Siamese mud carp)
- Henicorhynchus thaitui D. T. Nguyen, A. T. Ho, N. T. Hoang, H. Wu & E. Zhang, 2020

Synonyms

- Henicorhynchus cryptopogon (Fowler, 1935), synonym of Lobocheilos cryptopogon
- Henicorhynchus horai (Lakshmanan, 1966), synonym of Cirrhinus cirrhosus (Bloch, 1795)
- Henicorhynchus lineatus (Smith, 1945), synonym of Henicorhynchus caudimaculatus
- Henicorhynchus lobatus Smith, 1945, synonym of Henicorhynchus entmema
