= Lobocheilos terminalis =

Scientific classification
- Kingdom: Animalia
- Phylum: Chordata
- Class: Actinopterygii
- Order: Cypriniformes
- Family: Cyprinidae
- Genus: Lobocheilos
- Species: L. terminalis

Binomial name
- Lobocheilos terminalis Kottelat & Tan, 2008

Species of fish

Lobocheilos terminalis is a species of cyprinid in the genus Lobocheilos. It inhabits Malaysian Borneo and has a maximum length of 10.3 centimetres (4.1 in).
