= Bún mắm =

Vietnamese vermicelli soup

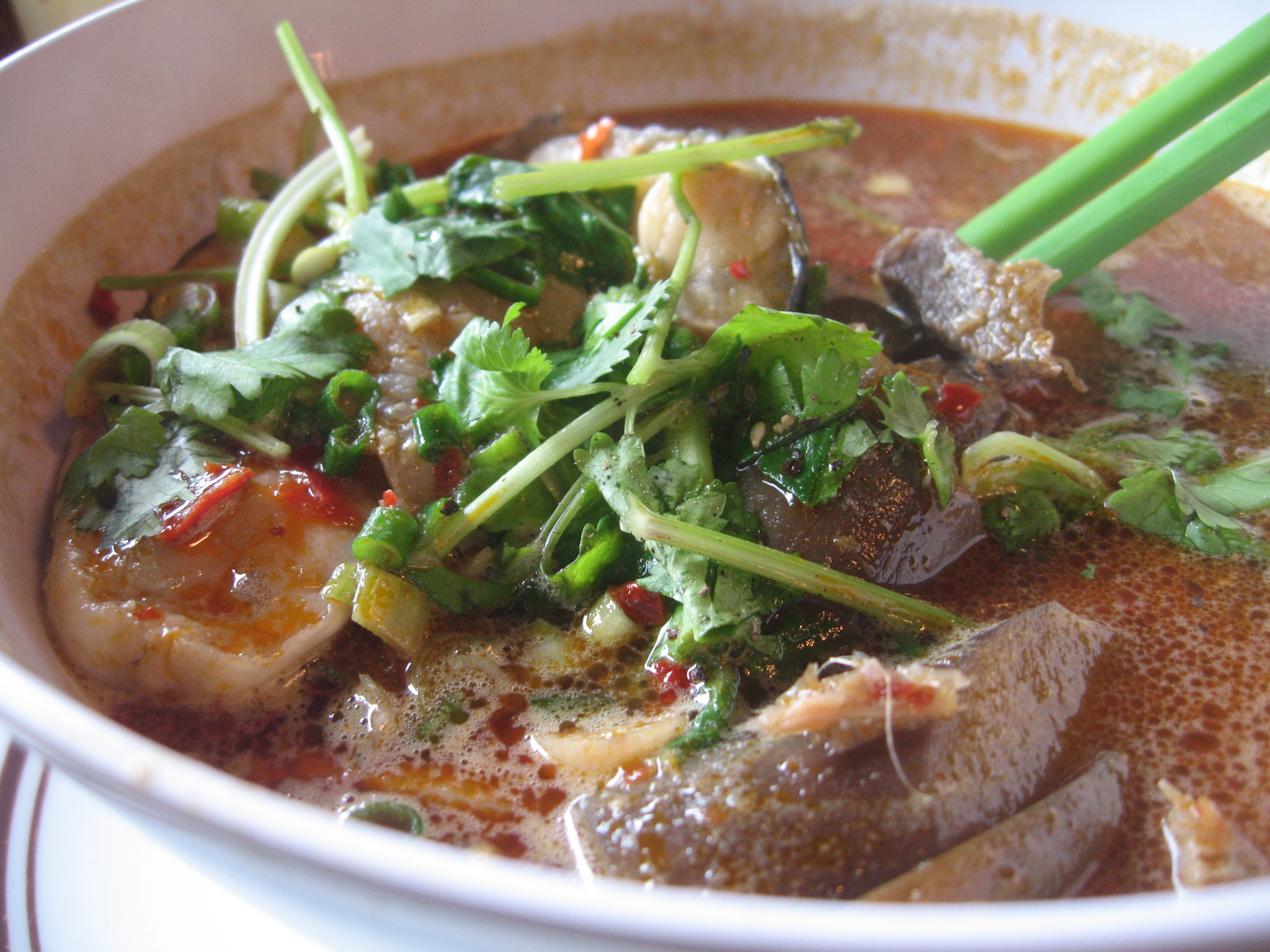
- A bowl of bún mắm
- Type: Soup
- Place of origin: Vietnam
- Region or state: Southeast Asia
- Main ingredients: Shrimp, fish paste, shrimp paste, rice vermicelli, siu yuk

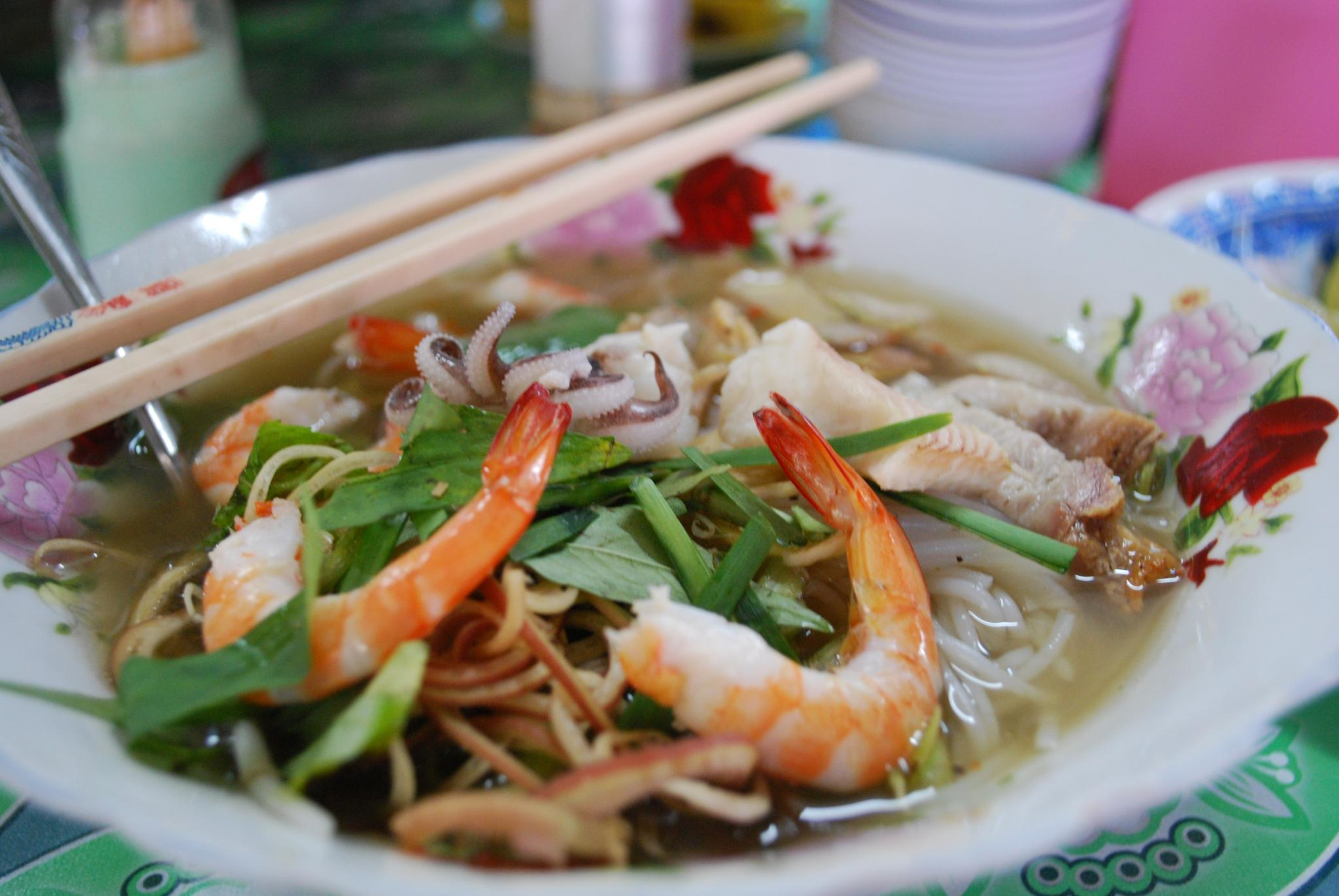
Bún mắm in Sóc Trăng

Bún mắm is a Vietnamese vermicelli soup made from fermented fish called mắm, sometimes called "Vietnamese gumbo".

== Etymology ==
Food reviewer Mike Sula explains, "Bun refers to the steamed rice vermicelli, which can be a bit mushy. But the key to this soup is the mam, as in mắm cá lóc (fermented fish paste) or mắm tôm (fermented shrimp paste), a murky purple slurry that on its own is one of the most odoriferous substances this side of a tannery fire. But added judiciously to soups or stir-fries it provides the elusive element of deep rounded flavor that puts the mam in umami."

== History ==
The origins of this dish is speculated to have come from Cambodia, however the dish itself comes from Vietnam's Mekong Delta. When the dish came into Vietnam, instead of using mắm bò hóc as a sauce for the broth, it was substituted for fish sauce using mắm cá linh or mắm cá sặc to adapt to the local taste by reducing the strong smell and making it easier to eat. It has become a southern Vietnamese dish created from the Mekong Delta, owing to its use of the unique and specific fish found from the rivers of the Mekong Delta. Bún mắm is usually served along with fresh greens and herbs.

== In the United States ==
Food critic Mike Sula recommended the bún mắm at Nha Hang Viet Nam in Chicago's Argyle Street neighborhood known as Little Vietnam, writing that it was, "brimming with eggplant, shrimp, squid, and silky, thinly sliced fish, accompanied by a heaping side of bean sprouts, cilantro, mint, and jalapeños."

A Boston-area restaurant reviewer praised the bún mắm at Hien Vuong in Dorchester, Boston as a "rarely-found noodle soup", describing it as "rich, smelly, salty, heady, tangy, sweet & sour, spicy and pungent. Umami-city".

In the San Francisco Bay Area, food critic Tim Costner called Bun Mam Soc Trang in Oakland, California a contender for the area's best bún mắm, praising its broth as "subtle in its complexity and delicate in its flavor," and saying "it will make you forget about all but the very best pho".
