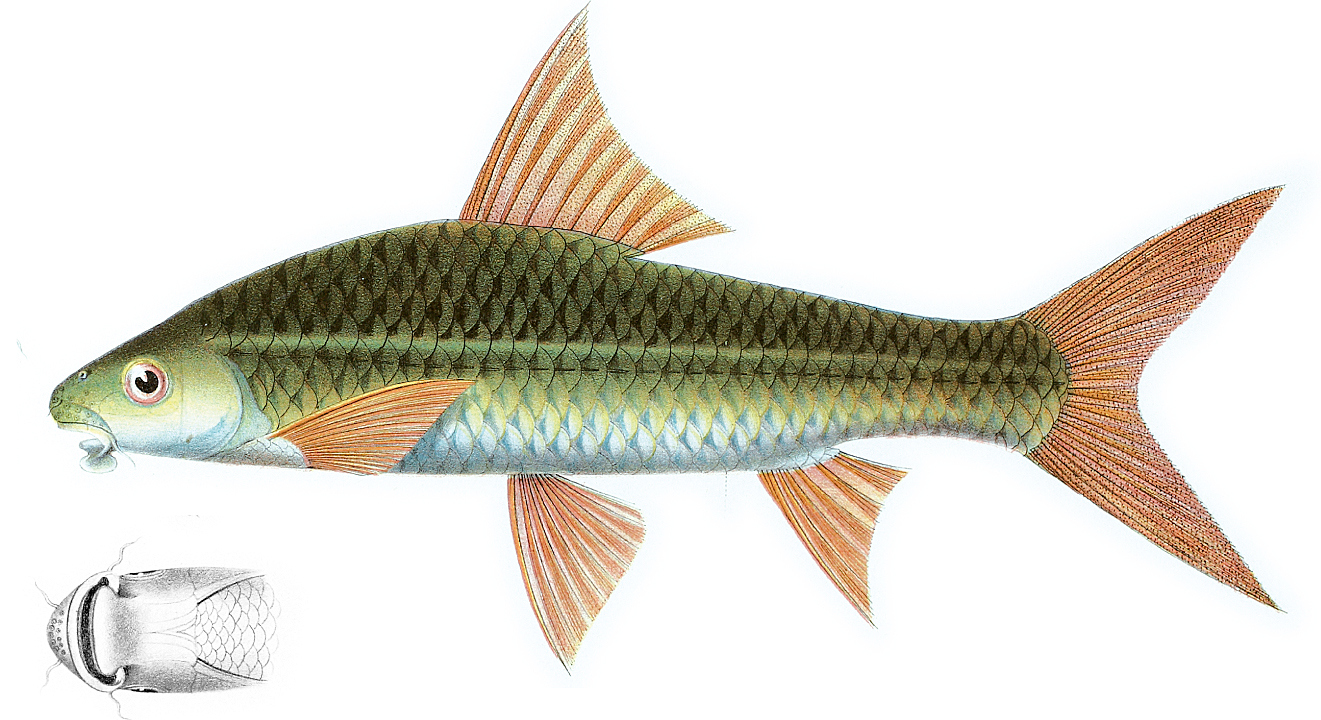

Conservation status
- Least Concern (IUCN 3.1)

Scientific classification
- Kingdom: Animalia
- Phylum: Chordata
- Class: Actinopterygii
- Division: Teleostei
- Order: Cypriniformes
- Family: Cyprinidae
- Genus: Lobocheilos
- Species: L. schwanefeldii

Binomial name
- Lobocheilos schwanefeldii Bleeker, 1854

Synonyms
- Tylognathus schwanenfeldii (Bleeker, 1854)

= Lobocheilos schwanefeldii =

Species of fish

Lobocheilos schwanefeldii is a species of freshwater ray-finned fish belonging to the family Cyprinidae, the family which includes the carps, barbs, minnows and related fishes. This fish is found in Indonesia.

== Taxonomy ==
Lobocheilos schwanefeldii was first formally described in 1854 by the Dutch physician, herpetologist and ichthyologist Pieter Bleeker with its type locality given as Solok in Western Sumatra. This species is classified in the genus Lobocheilos which is classified in the subfamily Labeoninae within the family Cyprinidae, which is classified in the order Cypriniformes.

== Etymology ==
Lobocheilos schwanefeldii is classified in the genus is Lobocheilos, this name is a combination of the Greek word lobos, meaning "protuberance", with cheilos, meaning "lip". An allusion to the "rostral cap" covereing the upper lip of L. falcifer, the type species of this genus. The specific name honours collector of the holotype, the Dutch military surgeon H. W. Schwanefeld. Bleeker misspelt this as "schwanenfeldii" and this is regarded as a correctable misprint.

== Description ==
Lobocheilos schwanefeldii has its dorsal fin which is supported by 11 soft rays and 8 soft rays support the anal fin. There are four barbels on the chin. This species does not have a black blotch on the caudal peduncle but there is an indistinct dark lateral stripe running along the flank over the entire length of the lateral line,this becomes less indistinct on the caudal peduncle. This species has a maximum published total length of 33.5 cm (13.2 in).

== Distribution and habiatat ==
Lobocheilos schwanefeldii is found in the Indragiri, Batanghari, Musi, and Sekampung River basins in eastern Sumatra, the Citarum basin in Western Java and the Barito basin in southeastern Borneo. However, it has not been recorded from Java for over a century and is most probably locally extinct there. This labeo prefers the upper reaches of river systems and can be found in habitats characterised by clear water flowing from slowly to swiftly over gravel and rocky riverbeds.
