= Lobocheilos unicornis =

Conservation status
- Least Concern (IUCN 3.1)

Scientific classification
- Kingdom: Animalia
- Phylum: Chordata
- Class: Actinopterygii
- Order: Cypriniformes
- Family: Cyprinidae
- Genus: Lobocheilos
- Species: L. unicornis

Binomial name
- Lobocheilos unicornis Kottelat & H. H. Tan, 2008

Species of fish

Lobocheilos unicornis is a species of freshwater ray-finned fish belonging to the family Cyprinidae, the family which includes the carps, barbs, minnows and related fishes. This species is endemic to northern Borneo where it is found in the north east in the valley of the Danum River in Sabah in East Malaysia. the maximum published standard length of 14 cm (5.5 in).
