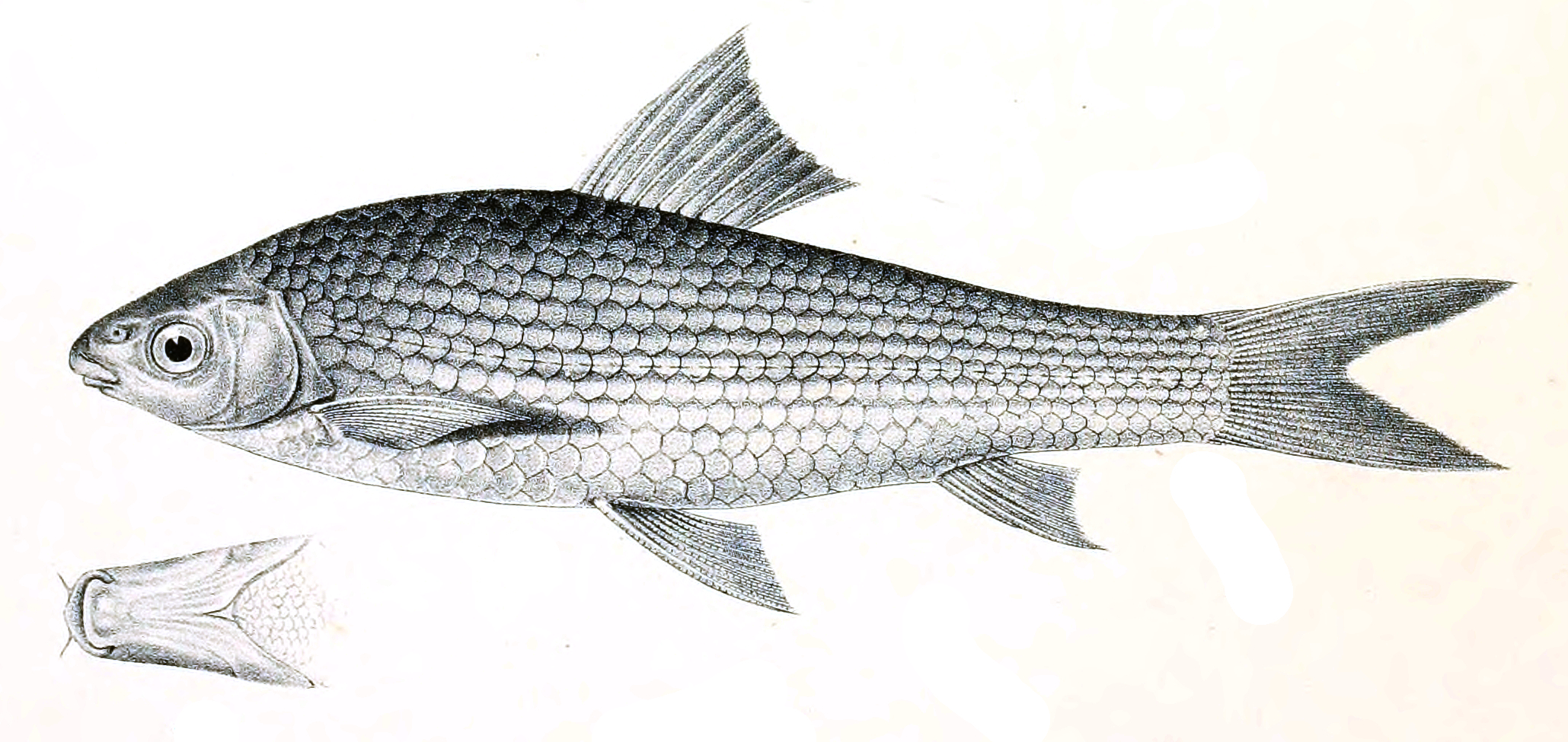

Conservation status
- Least Concern (IUCN 3.1)

Scientific classification
- Kingdom: Animalia
- Phylum: Chordata
- Class: Actinopterygii
- Order: Cypriniformes
- Family: Cyprinidae
- Subfamily: Labeoninae
- Genus: Cirrhinus
- Species: C. reba

Binomial name
- Cirrhinus reba (Hamilton, 1822)

Synonyms
- Cyprinus reba Hamilton, 1822; Crossocheilus reba (Hamilton, 1822); Gobio limnophilus McClelland, 1838; Gobio isurus McClelland, 1839; Cirrhina dussumieri Valenciennes, 1842; Chondrostoma gangeticum Valenciennes, 1844

= Reba carp =

Species of fish

The Reba carp (Cirrhinus reba) is a species of ray-finned fish in the genus Cirrhinus. This freshwater edible fish is found in large streams, rivers, tanks, lakes, reservoirs. It is native to Bangladesh, India, Nepal, Pakistan.

== Footnotes ==
- Froese, Rainer; Pauly, Daniel (eds.). "Cirrhinus reba". FishBase.
