= Mueang Chonburi district =

Mueang Chonburi เมืองชลบุรี
- District
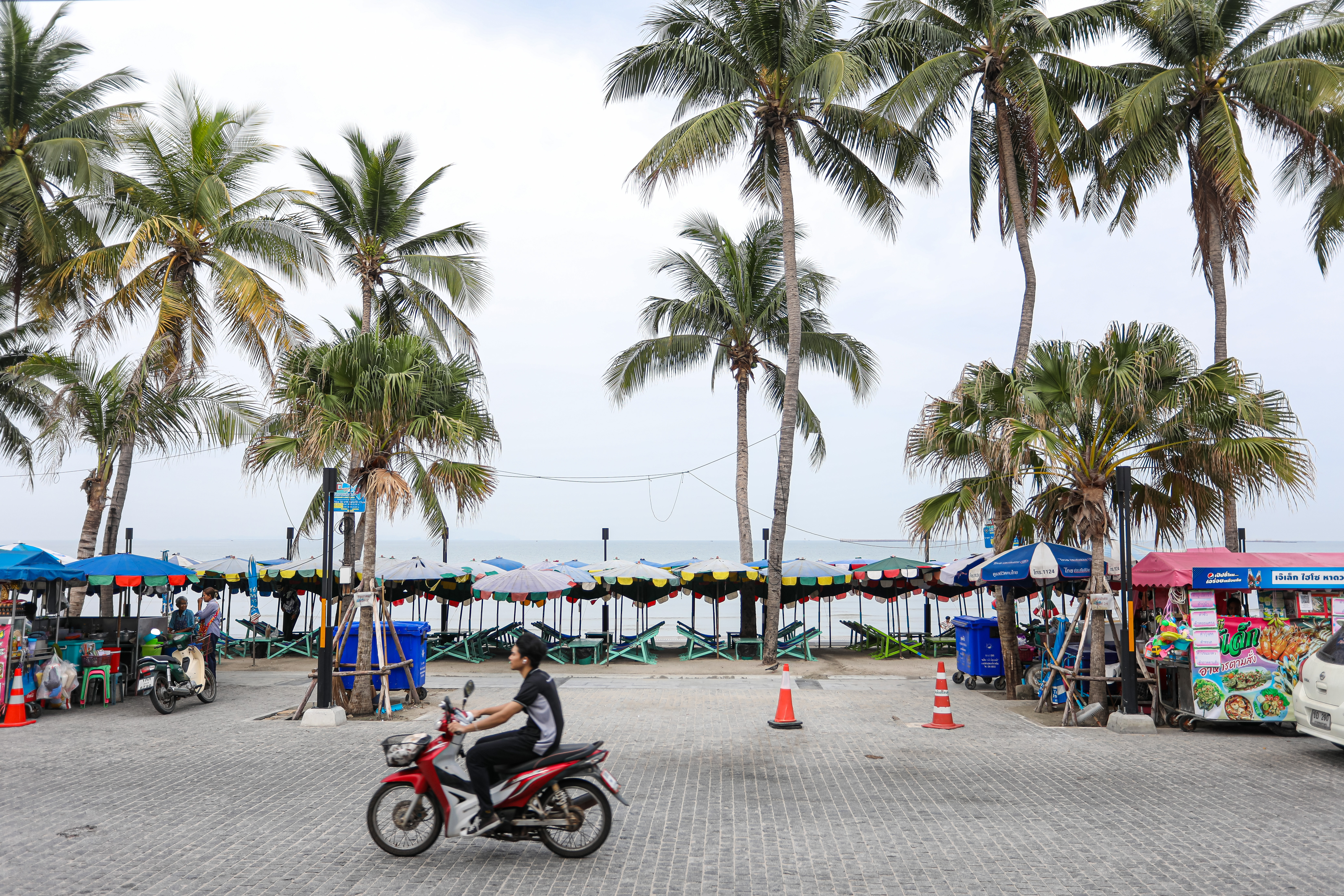
- Hat Bang Saen entrance

- District location in Chonburi province
- Coordinates: 13°21′43″N 100°58′45″E
- Country: Thailand
- Province: Chonburi
- Seat: Bang Pla Soi

Area
  - Total: 228.8 km^{2} (88.3 sq mi)

Population (2015)
  - Total: 322,057
  - Density: 1,407.59/km^{2} (3,645.6/sq mi)
- Time zone: UTC+7 (ICT)
- Postal code: 20000
- Geocode: 2001

Mueang Chonburi (Thai: เมืองชลบุรี, RTGS: Mueang Chon Buri, pronounced [mɯ̄a̯ŋ t͡ɕʰōn bū.rīː]) is the capital district (amphoe mueang) of Chonburi province, eastern Thailand.

== Geography ==
Neighbouring districts are (from the north clockwise) Bang Pakong of Chachoengsao province, Phan Thong, Ban Bueng and Si Racha. To the west is the Bay of Bangkok.

== History ==
On 14 November 1938 the district's name was changed from Bang Pla Soi (บางปลาสร้อย) to Mueang Chonburi .

== Administration ==
=== Central administration ===
The district Mueang Chon Buri is subdivided into 18 subdistricts (Tambon), which are further subdivided into 122 administrative villages (Muban).

No.	Name	Thai	Villages	Pop.
1.	Bang Pla Soi	บางปลาสร้อย	-	14,962
2.	Makham Yong	มะขามหย่ง	-	5,940
3.	Ban Khot	บ้านโขด	-	6,155
4.	Saen Suk	แสนสุข	15	38,469
5.	Ban Suan	บ้านสวน	10	66,032
6.	Nong Ri	หนองรี	14	15,857
7.	Na Pa	นาป่า	12	39,716
8.	Nong Khang Khok	หนองข้างคอก	7	7,990
9.	Don Hua Lo	ดอนหัวฬ่อ	7	12,114
10.	Nong Mai Daeng	หนองไม้แดง	7	12,815
11.	Bang Sai	บางทราย	6	12,419
12.	Khlong Tamru	คลองตำหรุ	6	8,050
13.	Mueang	เหมือง	5	15,364
14.	Ban Puek	บ้านปึก	7	8,797
15.	Huai Kapi	ห้วยกะปิ	7	23,835
16.	Samet	เสม็ด	8	35,323
17.	Ang Sila	อ่างศิลา	5	5,838
18.	Samnak Bok	สำนักบก	6	5,387

=== Local administration ===
There are 4 towns (Thesaban Mueang) in the district:

- Chon Buri (Thai: เทศบาลเมืองชลบุรี) consisting of the complete subdistrict Bang Pla Soi, Makham Yong, Ban Khot.
- Saen Suk (Thai: เทศบาลเมืองแสนสุข) consisting of the complete subdistrict Saen Suk and parts of the subdistricts Mueang, Huai Kapi.
- Ban Suan (Thai: เทศบาลเมืองบ้านสวน) consisting of the complete subdistrict Ban Suan and parts of the subdistricts Nong Ri, Nong Khang Khok.
- Ang Sila (Thai: เทศบาลเมืองอ่างศิลา) consisting of the complete subdistrict Ban Puek, Ang Sila and parts of the subdistricts Huai Kapi, Samet.

There are 8 subdistrict municipalities (Thesaban Tambon) in the district:

- Khlong Tamru (Thai: เทศบาลตำบลคลองตำหรุ) consisting of parts of the subdistrict Khlong Tamru.
- Bang Sai (Thai: เทศบาลตำบลบางทราย) consisting of the complete subdistrict Bang Sai.
- Nong Mai Daeng (Thai: เทศบาลตำบลหนองไม้แดง) consisting of the complete subdistrict Nong Mai Daeng.
- Na Pa (Thai: เทศบาลตำบลนาป่า) consisting of the complete subdistrict Na Pa.
- Huai Kapi (Thai: เทศบาลตำบลห้วยกะปิ) consisting of parts of the subdistrict Huai Kapi.
- Don Hua Lo (Thai: เทศบาลตำบลดอนหัวฬ่อ) consisting of the complete subdistrict Don Hua Lo.
- Samet (Thai: เทศบาลตำบลเสม็ด) consisting of parts of the subdistrict Samet.
- Mueang (Thai: เทศบาลตำบลเหมือง) consisting of parts of the subdistrict Mueang.

There are 4 subdistrict administrative organizations (SAO) in the district:

- Nong Ri (Thai: องค์การบริหารส่วนตำบลหนองรี) consisting of parts of the subdistrict Nong Ri.
- Nong Khang Khok (Thai: องค์การบริหารส่วนตำบลหนองข้างคอก) consisting of parts of the subdistrict Nong Khang Khok.
- Khlong Tamru (Thai: องค์การบริหารส่วนตำบลคลองตำหรุ) consisting of parts of the subdistrict Khlong Tamru.
- Samnak Bok (Thai: องค์การบริหารส่วนตำบลสำนักบก) consisting of the complete subdistrict Samnak Bok.

== Economy ==
Ang Sila is a leading producer of granite mortars and pestles, essential in the preparation of Thai cuisine.
