= Bangana devdevi =

Conservation status
- Least Concern (IUCN 3.1)

Scientific classification
- Kingdom: Animalia
- Phylum: Chordata
- Class: Actinopterygii
- Division: Teleostei
- Order: Cypriniformes
- Family: Cyprinidae
- Subfamily: Labeoninae
- Genus: Bangana
- Species: B. devdevi

Binomial name
- Bangana devdevi (Hora, 1936)

Synonyms
- Labeo devdevi Hora, 1936

Species of fish

Bangana devdevi is a species of cyprinid fish found in India, Myanmar, and Thailand.
