= Henicorhynchus ornatipinnis =

Conservation status
- Least Concern (IUCN 3.1)

Scientific classification
- Kingdom: Animalia
- Phylum: Chordata
- Class: Actinopterygii
- Order: Cypriniformes
- Family: Cyprinidae
- Genus: Henicorhynchus
- Species: H. ornatipinnis

Binomial name
- Henicorhynchus ornatipinnis (Roberts, 1997)

Synonyms
- Gymnostomus ornatipinnis Roberts, 1997

Species of fish

Henicorhynchus ornatipinnis is a fresh water fish of the genus Henicorhynchus. It is found in the Mekong River.
