= Bangana nukta =

Conservation status
- Endangered (IUCN 3.1)

Scientific classification
- Kingdom: Animalia
- Phylum: Chordata
- Class: Actinopterygii
- Order: Cypriniformes
- Family: Cyprinidae
- Genus: Bangana
- Species: B. nukta

Binomial name
- Bangana nukta (Sykes, 1839)

Synonyms
- Cyprinus nukta Sykes, 1839; Labeo nukta (Sykes, 1839); Schismatorhynchos nukta (Sykes, 1839)

Species of cyprinid

Bangana nukta is a species of cyprinid fish, also known as nukta. It inhabits Krishna and Kaveri river systems in the states of Maharashtra, Andhra Pradesh, Karnataka, and Tamil Nadu. It is found in large streams and rivers with sand and boulder bed. It grows to 30 cm (12 in) total length.

Bangana nukta is threatened by heavy fishing pressure and ecosystem degradation. It is becoming a rare species and has already disappeared from parts of its range.
