= Henicorhynchus entmema =

Conservation status
- Least Concern (IUCN 3.1)

Scientific classification
- Kingdom: Animalia
- Phylum: Chordata
- Class: Actinopterygii
- Order: Cypriniformes
- Family: Cyprinidae
- Genus: Henicorhynchus
- Species: H. entmema

Binomial name
- Henicorhynchus entmema (Fowler, 1934)

Synonyms
- Cirrhinus lobatus (Smith, 1945); Gymnostomus lobatus (Smith, 1945); Henicorhynchus lobatus Smith, 1945; Tylognathus entmema Fowler, 1934

Species of fish

Henicorhynchus entmema, the notched mud carp or lesser silver mud carp, is a species of freshwater fish in the family Cyprinidae. It is endemic to Indochina (Thailand, Cambodia, Laos, and Vietnam). It is common in the Mekong and also occurs in the Mae Klong and Chao Phraya basins as well as in the associated lowland areas. It is a keystone species in the Mekong.

== Habitat and behaviour ==
Henicorhynchus entmema occurs in rapids and in slow-flowing water, also in small streams. It is the numerically most abundant fish species in the seasonal migrations occurring in the mainstream Mekong below the Khone Phapheng Falls. This migration is potentially threatened by the proposed hydropower developments.

== Fisheries ==
It is an important species in commercial and small scale fisheries. The estimated total catch in the lower Mekong, about 5,000 tonnes, corresponds to 4% of the total lower Mekong catches.
