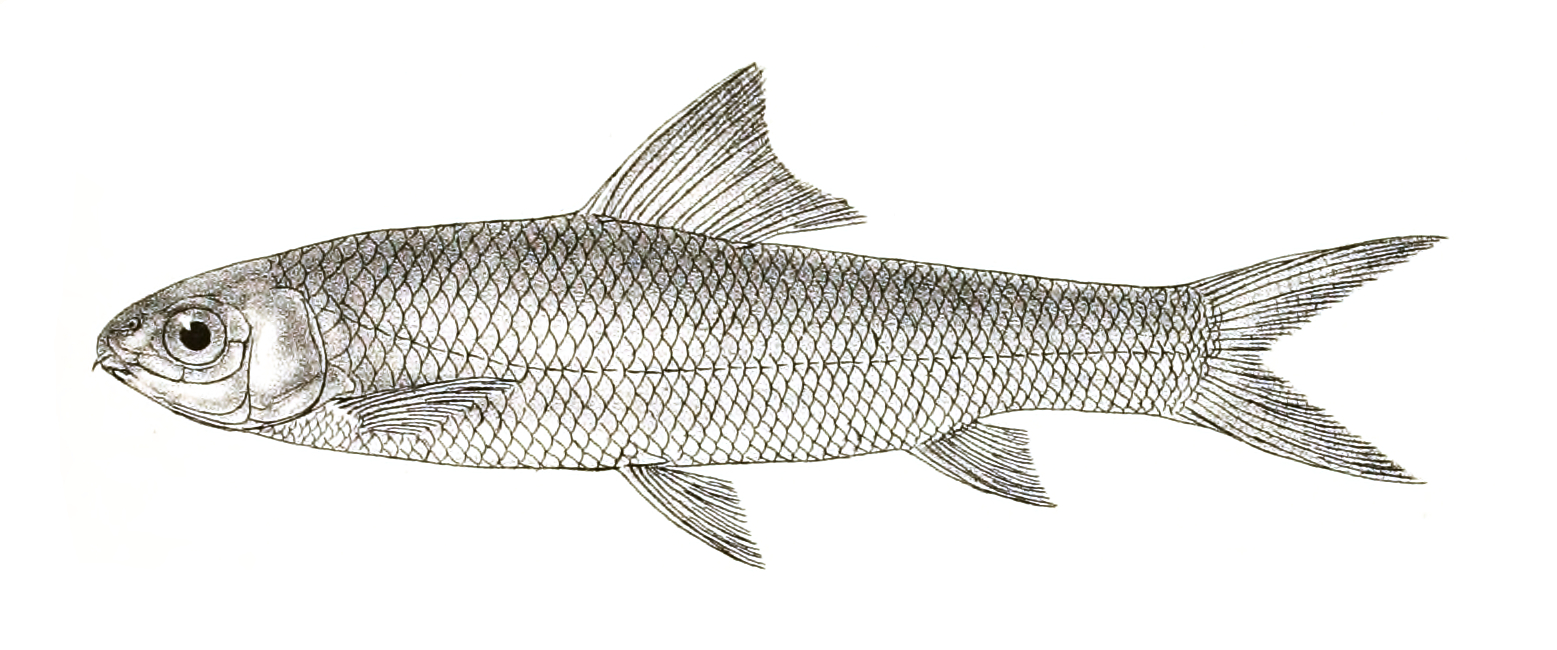

Conservation status
- Least Concern (IUCN 3.1)

Scientific classification
- Kingdom: Animalia
- Phylum: Chordata
- Class: Actinopterygii
- Order: Cypriniformes
- Family: Cyprinidae
- Subfamily: Labeoninae
- Genus: Gymnostomus
- Species: G. fulungee

Binomial name
- Gymnostomus fulungee (Sykes, 1839)

Synonyms
- Chondrostoma fulungee Sykes, 1839; Cirrhinus fulungee (Sykes, 1839)

= Deccan white carp =

Species of fish

The Deccan white carp (Gymnostomus fulungee) is a species of freshwater cyprinid fish native to Karnataka and Maharashtra in India initially but later to other states after the construction of dams. It is currently widely distributed across the states of Maharashtra, Karnataka, Telangana, Andhra Pradesh, Chhattisgarh, and Madhya Pradesh.

The species can attain a length of 30 cm. It is used for food but does not support large fisheries. It is often sold in local markets.
