= Bangana almorae =

Conservation status
- Vulnerable (IUCN 3.1)

Scientific classification
- Kingdom: Animalia
- Phylum: Chordata
- Class: Actinopterygii
- Order: Cypriniformes
- Family: Cyprinidae
- Subfamily: Labeoninae
- Genus: Bangana
- Species: B. almorae

Binomial name
- Bangana almorae (Chaudhuri, 1912)

Synonyms
- Labeo almorae Chaudhuri, 1912

Species of fish

Bangana almorae is a species of cyprinid fish endemic the Ganges basin in India.
