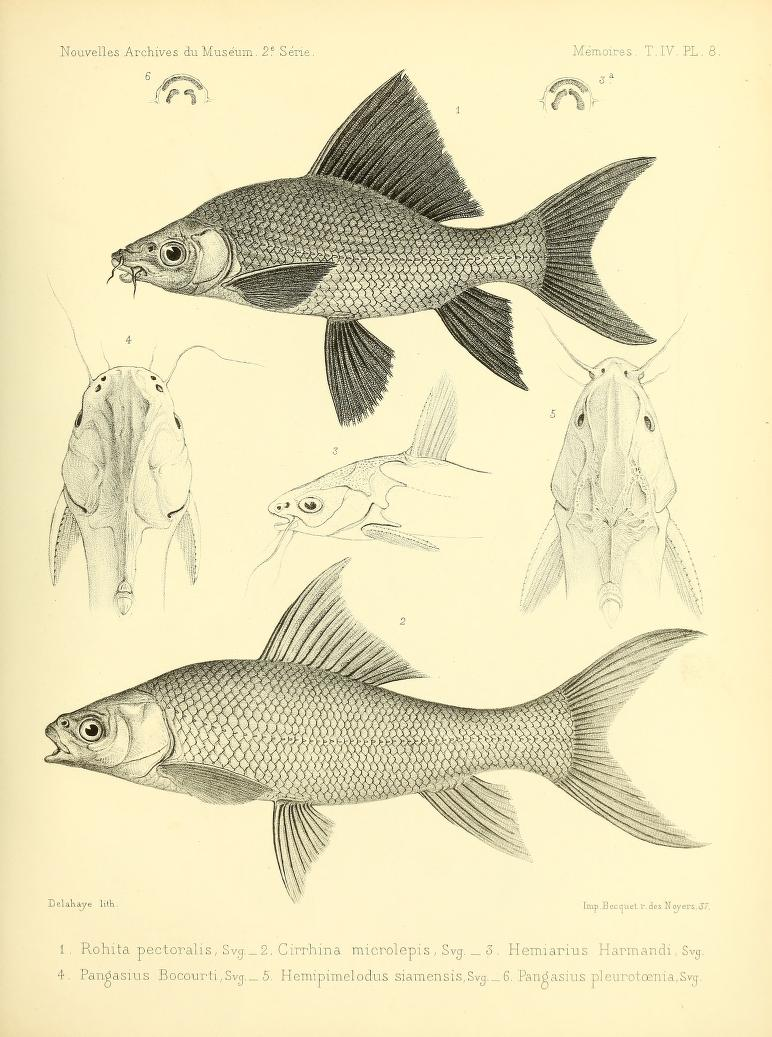
- 2 Cirrhinus microlepis

Conservation status
- Vulnerable (IUCN 3.1)

Scientific classification
- Kingdom: Animalia
- Phylum: Chordata
- Class: Actinopterygii
- Order: Cypriniformes
- Family: Cyprinidae
- Subfamily: Labeoninae
- Genus: Cirrhinus
- Species: C. microlepis

Binomial name
- Cirrhinus microlepis Sauvage, 1878

Synonyms
- Labeo aurovittatus Sauvage, 1878; Cirrhinus auratus Sauvage, 1878; Labeo pruol Tirant, 1885

= Smallscale mud carp =

Species of fish

The smallscale mud carp (Cirrhinus microlepis) is a species of ray-finned fish in the genus Cirrhinus. It is known from the Chao Phraya and Mekong river basins, but may have been extirpated from the former.
