= Henicorhynchus caudimaculatus =

Conservation status
- Least Concern (IUCN 3.1)

Scientific classification
- Kingdom: Animalia
- Phylum: Chordata
- Class: Actinopterygii
- Order: Cypriniformes
- Family: Cyprinidae
- Genus: Henicorhynchus
- Species: H. caudimaculatus

Binomial name
- Henicorhynchus caudimaculatus (Fowler, 1934)

Synonyms
- Cirrhinus caudimaculatus Fowler, 1934; Cirrhinus lineatus Smith, 1945; Gymnostomus caudimaculatus Fowler, 1934; Gymnostomus lineatus (Smith, 1945); Henicorhynchus lineatus (Smith, 1945)

Species of fish

Henicorhynchus caudimaculatus, the striped mud carp, is a species of ray-finned fish in the genus Henicorhynchus. It is native to Indochina.
