= Gymnostomus =

Scientific classification
- Domain: Eukaryota
- Kingdom: Animalia
- Phylum: Chordata
- Class: Actinopterygii
- Order: Cypriniformes
- Family: Cyprinidae
- Subfamily: Labeoninae
- Genus: Gymnostomus; Heckel, 1843

Type species
- Cyprinus ariza Hamilton, 1807

Genus of fishes

Gymnostomus is a genus of cyprinid fish found in Southeast Asia.

== Species ==
- Gymnostomus ariza (Hamilton, 1807) (Reba)
- Gymnostomus fulungee (Sykes, 1839) (Deccan white carp)
- Gymnostomus horai (Bănărescu, 1986)
