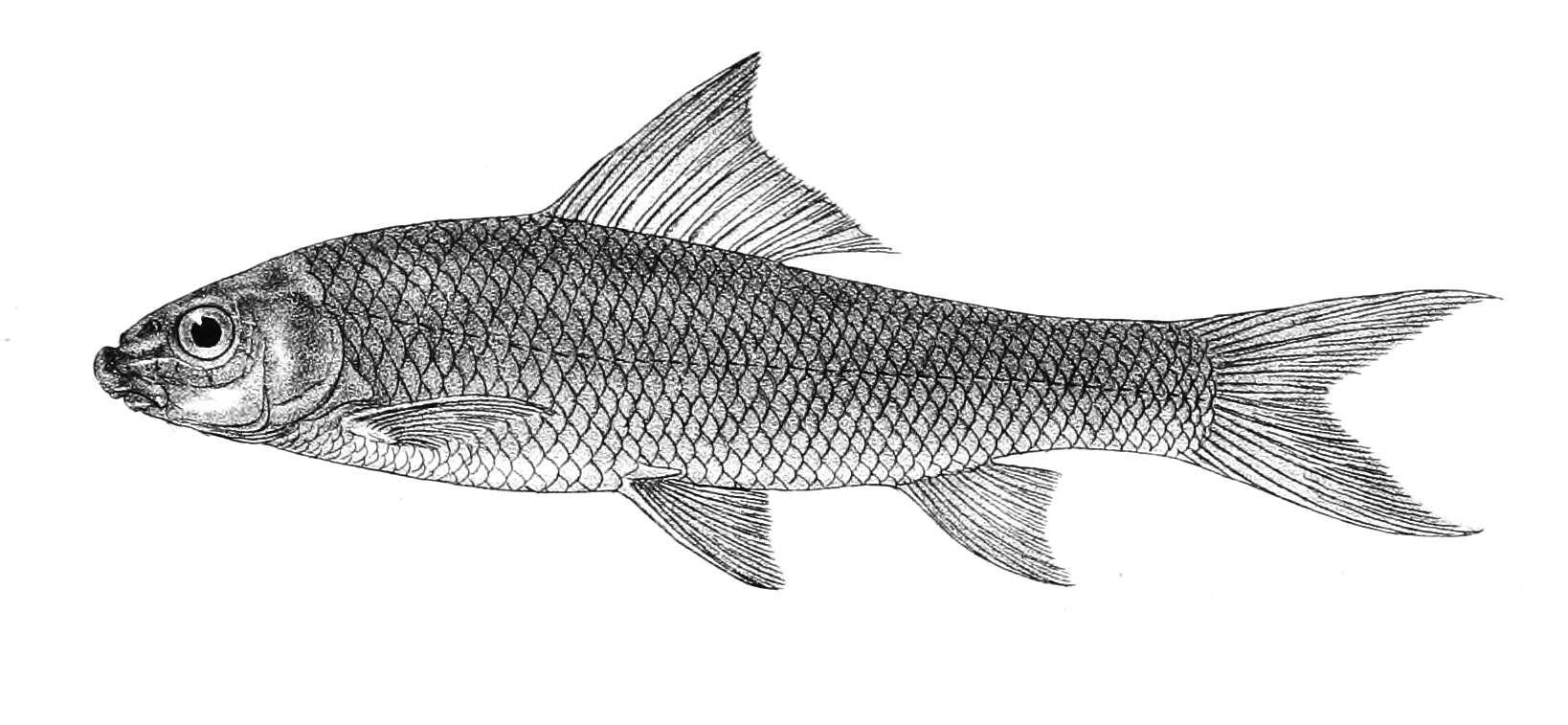

Conservation status
- Least Concern (IUCN 3.1)

Scientific classification
- Kingdom: Animalia
- Phylum: Chordata
- Class: Actinopterygii
- Order: Cypriniformes
- Family: Cyprinidae
- Subfamily: Labeoninae
- Genus: Bangana
- Species: B. diplostoma

Binomial name
- Bangana diplostoma (Heckel, 1838)

Synonyms
- Labeo diplostomus; Tylognathus valenciennesii; Varicorhinus diplostomus

= Bangana diplostoma =

Species of fish

Bangana diplostoma is a species of cyprinid fish found in India and Pakistan.
