= Bangana gedrosicus =

Conservation status
- Least Concern (IUCN 3.1)

Scientific classification
- Kingdom: Animalia
- Phylum: Chordata
- Class: Actinopterygii
- Order: Cypriniformes
- Family: Cyprinidae
- Subfamily: Labeoninae
- Genus: Bangana
- Species: B. gedrosicus

Binomial name
- Bangana gedrosicus (Zugmayer, 1912)

Synonyms
- Labeo gedrosicus Zugmayer, 1912; Tylognathus gedrosicus (Zugmayer, 1912)

Species of fish

Bangana gedrosicus is a species of cyprinid fish endemic to Pakistan and Iran where it is only found in the Mashkel River drainage in Baluchistan.
