= Lobocheilos kajanensis =

Conservation status
- Least Concern (IUCN 3.1)

Scientific classification
- Kingdom: Animalia
- Phylum: Chordata
- Class: Actinopterygii
- Order: Cypriniformes
- Family: Cyprinidae
- Genus: Lobocheilos
- Species: L. kajanensis

Binomial name
- Lobocheilos kajanensis (Popta, 1904)

Synonyms
- Tylognathus kajanensis Popta, 1904

Species of fish

Lobocheilos kajanensis is a species of freshwater ray-finned fish belonging to the family Cyprinidae, the family which includes the carps, barbs, minnows and related fishes. This species is endemic to Borneo where it is found in the upper basin of the Kayan River,
