= Lobocheilos bo =

Conservation status
- Least Concern (IUCN 3.1)

Scientific classification
- Kingdom: Animalia
- Phylum: Chordata
- Class: Actinopterygii
- Order: Cypriniformes
- Family: Cyprinidae
- Genus: Lobocheilos
- Species: L. bo

Binomial name
- Lobocheilos bo (Popta, 1904)

Synonyms
- Tylognathus bo Popta, 1904; Tylognathus boides Popta, 1906

Species of fish

Lobocheilos bo is a species of freshwater ray-finned fish belonging to the family Cyprinidae, the family which includes the carps, barbs, minnows and related fishes. This species is endemic to Borneo where it is found in the basins of the Mahakam, Kayan, and Sesayap Rivers in the eastern part of the island. This species has a maximum published standard length of 32.5 cm (12.8 in).
