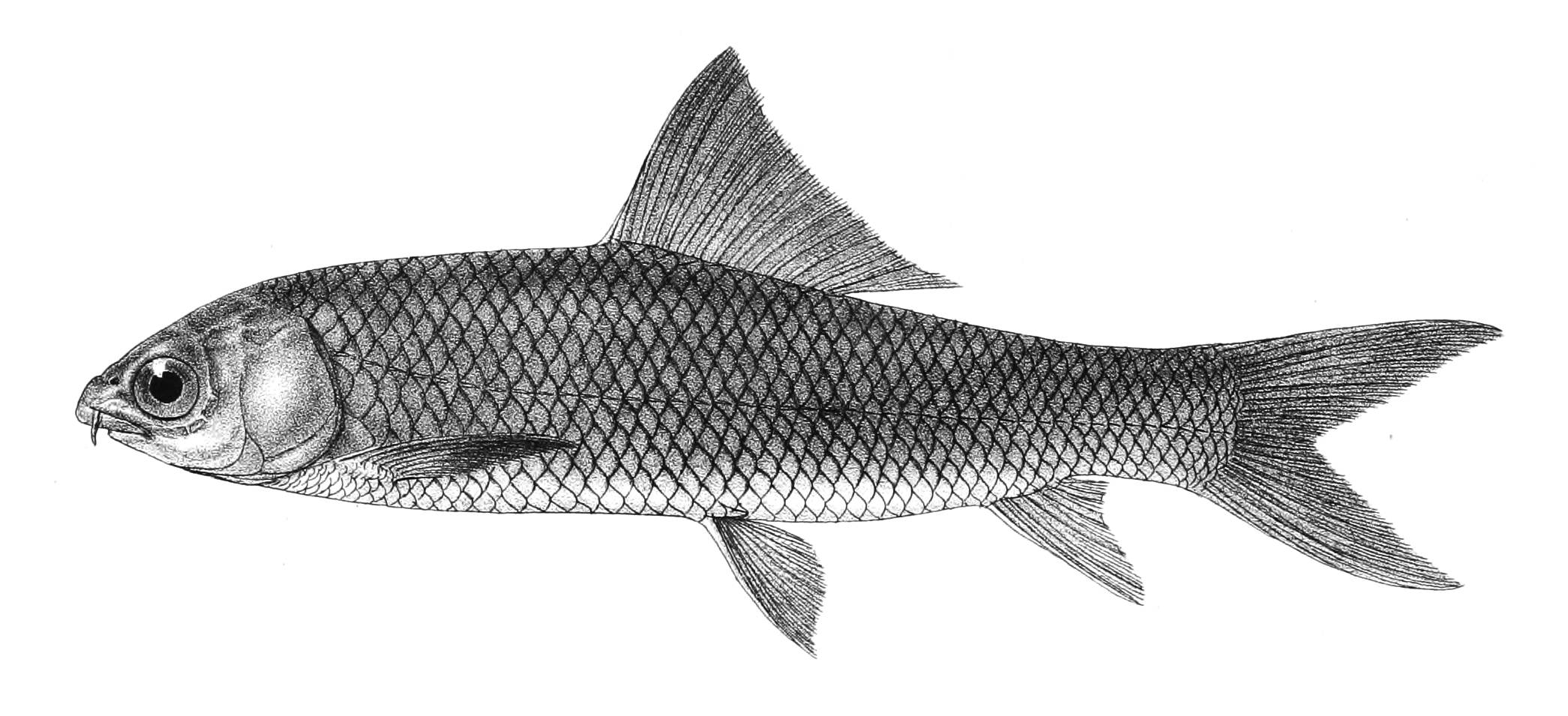

Conservation status
- Least Concern (IUCN 3.1)

Scientific classification
- Kingdom: Animalia
- Phylum: Chordata
- Class: Actinopterygii
- Order: Cypriniformes
- Family: Cyprinidae
- Subfamily: Labeoninae
- Genus: Cirrhinus
- Species: C. mrigala

Binomial name
- Cirrhinus mrigala Hamilton, 1822

Synonyms
- Cyprinus mrigal

= Cirrhinus mrigala =

Species of fish

Cirrhinus mrigala is a species of ray-finned fish in the genus Cirrhinus. It is found in northern India, Pakistan, Bangladesh and Nepal. This species and the Mrigal carp (Cirrhinus cirrhosus) are both considered distinct.
