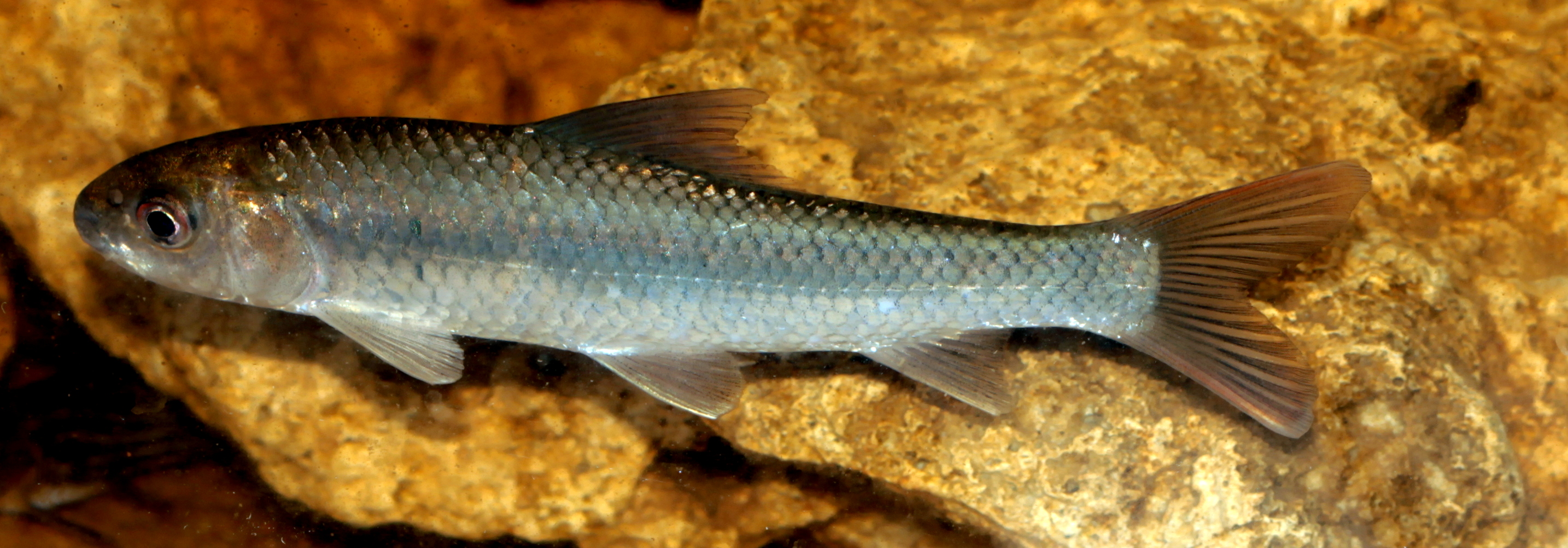

Conservation status
- Least Concern (IUCN 3.1)

Scientific classification
- Kingdom: Animalia
- Phylum: Chordata
- Class: Actinopterygii
- Order: Cypriniformes
- Family: Cyprinidae
- Subfamily: Labeoninae
- Genus: Labeo
- Species: L. bata

Binomial name
- Labeo bata F. Hamilton, 1822

Synonyms
- Cyprinus bata Hamilton, 1822

= Labeo bata =

Species of fish

Labeo bata (Assamese: ভাঙন, Bengali: বাটা, romanized: bātā) is a fish in genus Labeo. It is a native fish to India and Bangladesh.

== Description ==
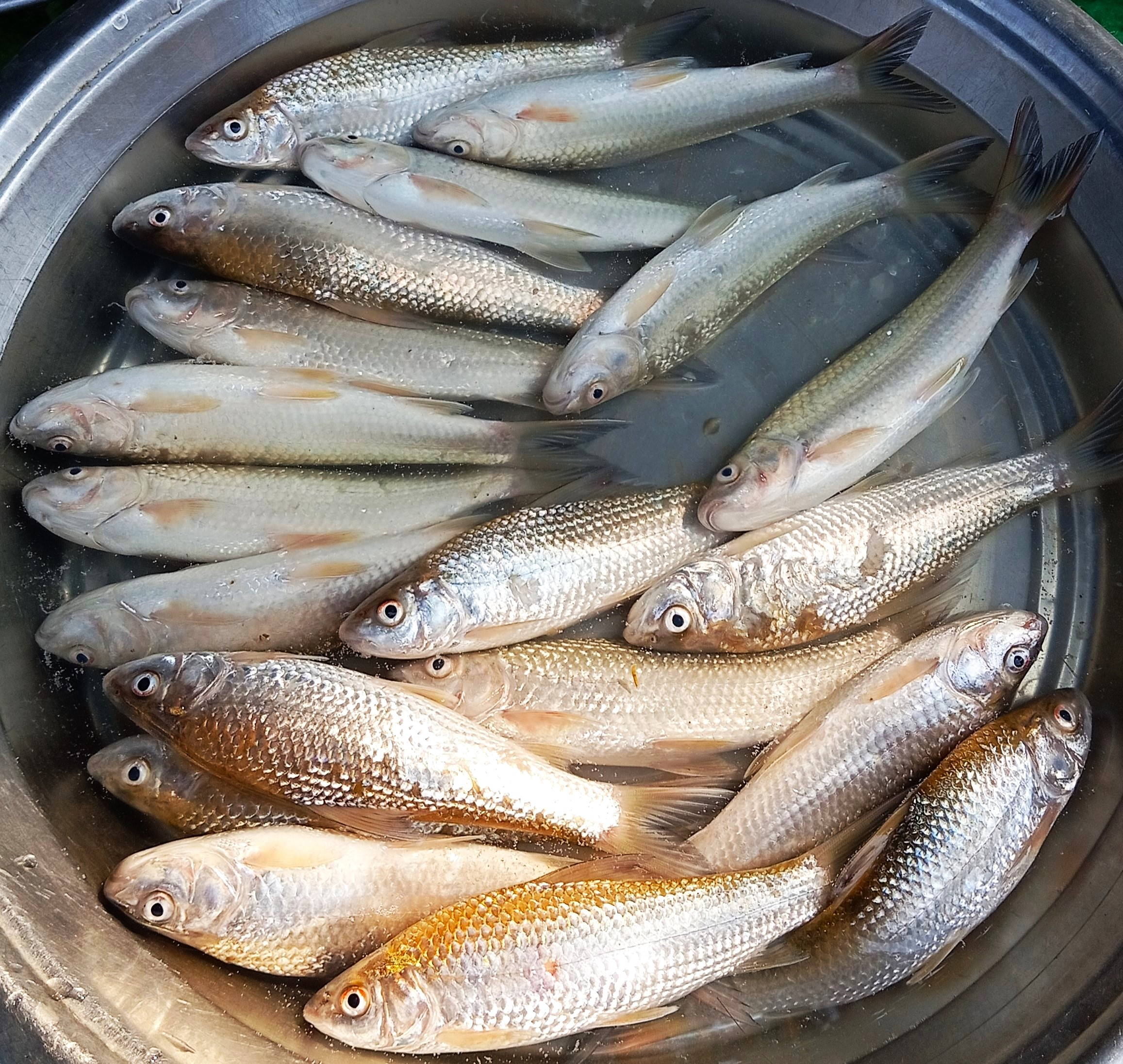
Labeo bata, West Bengal, India

It is a popular game fish and is popular for its taste. Its maximum length is 25–35 centimetres (9.8–13.8 in). It eats protozoa, algae, and tiny fishes. It is a slow-moving fish, so with any active and aggressive it will be nervous. The age and growth of Labeo bata (Ham.) was studied by the analysis of annuli found on the scale and by length-frequency distribution. The fish attained lengths of 131, 194, 236, 277, 314, 341 and 364 mm at the end of the 1st, 2nd, 3rd, 4th, 5th, 6th and 7th years of life respectively. The increase in length of scale bears a constant relationship with the increase in length of fish. The growth rate of the fish was found high during the 1st and 2nd years, and decreased gradually afterwards till the 7th year. Both sexes showed more or less similar growth rate. The seasonal growth curve was chiefly influenced by feeding intensity in fishes of 1st year class, while in adults it was affected by feeding intensity as well as by maturation of the gonads. The body is elongate. Its dorsal profile is more convex than the ventral. The snout slightly projects beyond the mouth, often studded with pores. A pair of small maxillary barbells is hidden inside the labial fold. There is no cartilaginous support to the lips. The dorsal originates midway between the snout tip and the anterior base of anal. Pelvics originate slightly nearer to the snout tip than to the caudal base. It is bluish or darkish on upper half, silvery below, and the opercle is light orange. Its food comprises crustaceans and an insect larva in early stages. This fish is found throughout India (West Bengal, Odisha, Tripura etc.) and Bangladesh. Ponds, rivers, rivulets are its main habitats. A study in the Khulna District in Bangladesh found the species endangered, while overall it is considered of least concern due to intense aquaculture.

== External websites ==
- Labeo bata on FishBase
