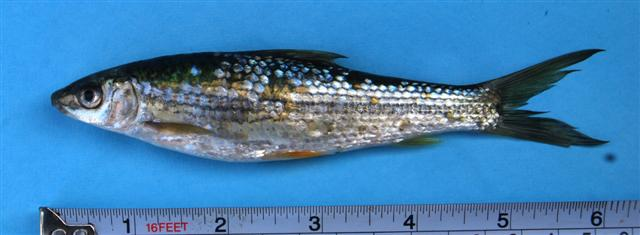
- Cirrhinus reba

Scientific classification
- Kingdom: Animalia
- Phylum: Chordata
- Class: Actinopterygii
- Order: Cypriniformes
- Family: Cyprinidae
- Subfamily: Labeoninae
- Genus: Cirrhinus; Oken, 1817

Type species
- Cyprinus cirrhosus Bloch, 1795

Synonyms
- Isocephalus Heckel, 1843

= Cirrhinus =

Genus of fishes

Cirrhinus is a genus of fish in the family Cyprinidae, the carps and minnows. Members of this genus are native to freshwater in South Asia, Indochina and southern China.

== Species ==
These are the species in the genus.

- Cirrhinus cirrhosus (Bloch, 1795) (mrigal carp)
- Cirrhinus jullieni Sauvage, 1878
- Cirrhinus microlepis Sauvage, 1878 (smallscale mud carp)
- Cirrhinus mrigala (Hamilton, 1822)
- Cirrhinus prosemion (Fowler, 1934)
- Cirrhinus reba (Hamilton, 1822) (reba carp)

Synonyms

- Cirrhinus macrops Steindachner, 1870 (hora white carp); synonym of C. cirrhosus
- Cirrhinus molitorella (Valenciennes, 1844) (mud carp); now in the monospecific genus Disymphia (Endruweit, 2025)
