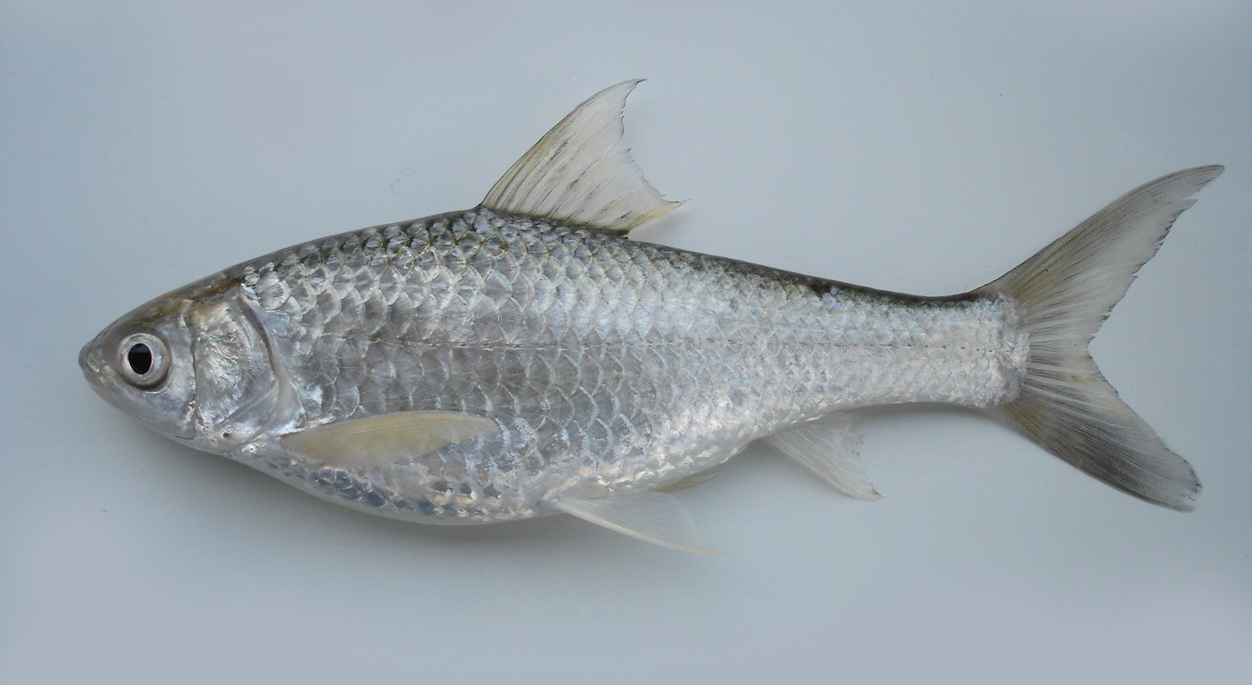

Conservation status
- Least Concern (IUCN 3.1)

Scientific classification
- Kingdom: Animalia
- Phylum: Chordata
- Class: Actinopterygii
- Order: Cypriniformes
- Family: Cyprinidae
- Subfamily: Labeoninae
- Genus: Henicorhynchus
- Species: H. siamensis

Binomial name
- Henicorhynchus siamensis (Sauvage, 1881)

Synonyms
- Crossocheilus reba Smith, 1945; Morara siamensis Sauvage, 1881 ex. Bleeker, 1865; Aspidoparia siamensis (Sauvage, 1881); Cirrhinus siamensis (Sauvage, 1881); Gymnostomus siamensis (Sauvage, 1881); Tylognathus brunneus Fowler, 1934; Cirrhinus marginipinnis Fowler, 1937; Cirrhina sauvagei Fang, 1942; Crossocheilus thai Fowler, 1944; Tylognathus siamensis de Beaufort, 1927

= Siamese mud carp =

Species of fish

The Siamese mud carp (Henicorhynchus siamensis) is a species of freshwater cyprinid fish, a variety of Asian carp native to the Mekong and Chao Phraya Rivers in Southeast Asia, especially in Cambodia, Laos and Thailand. It is very common in floodplains during the wet season and migrates upstream in the Mekong starting in Cambodia.

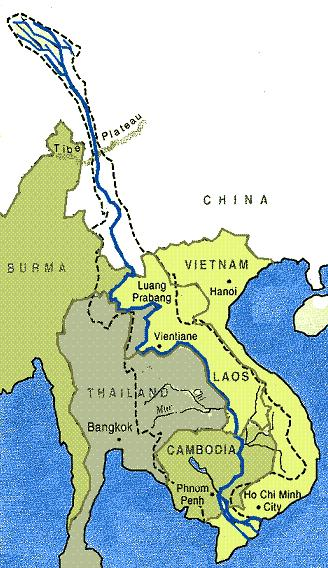
Map showing the course of the Mekong River.

The Siamese mud carp has commercial use locally, both as food and in the aquarium trade.

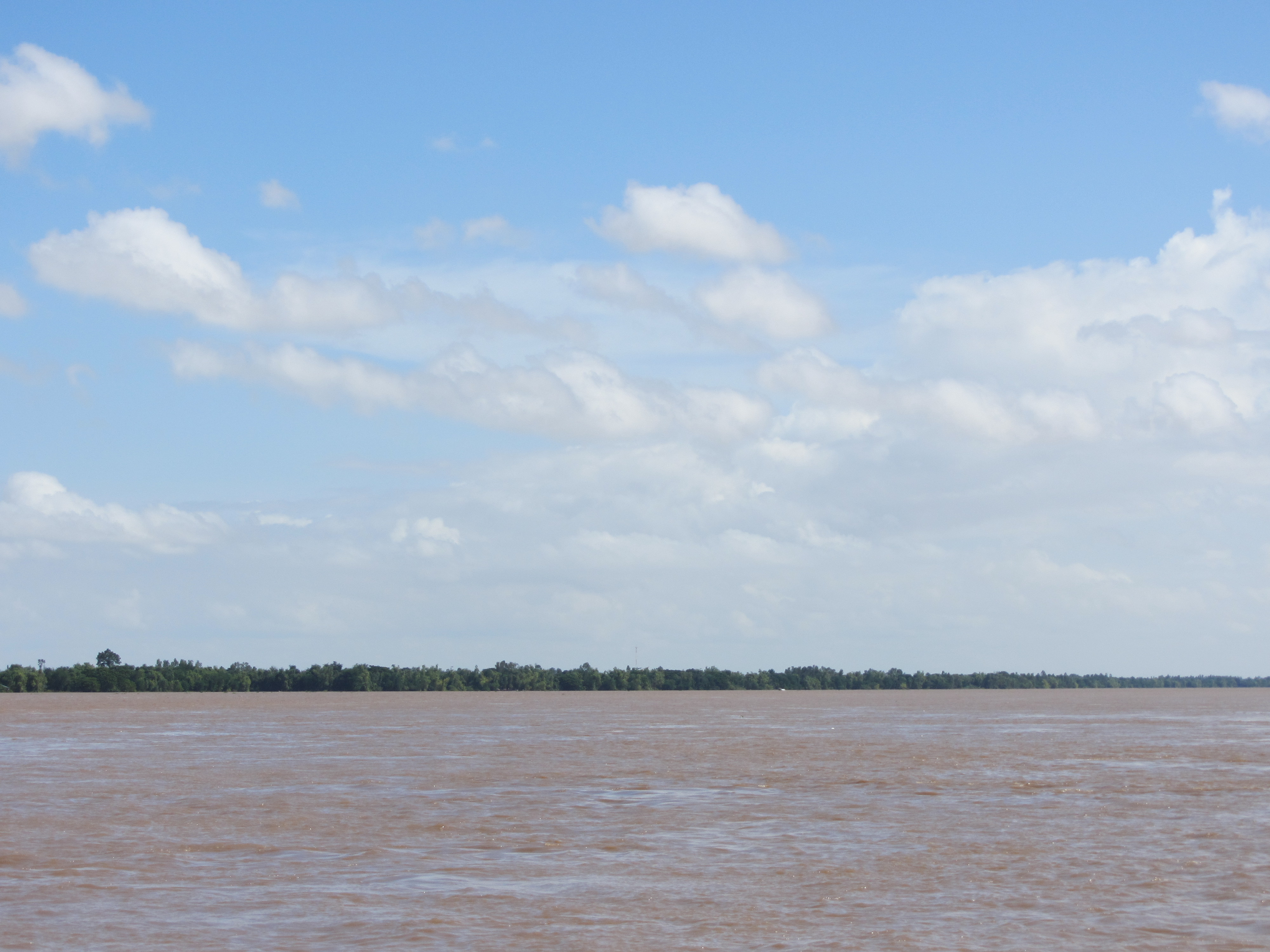
Mekong River, prime habitat of the Siamese mud carp.

Local names:

- Thai: pla soi khao (ปลาสร้อยขาว, pronounced [plāː sɔ̂j kʰǎːw])
- Laotian: ປາຊວຍ [paː swáːj]
- Khmer: trey riel tob (ត្រីរៀលតុបគា)
- Vietnamese: Cá linh thùy.
