= Chonkanyanukoon School =

School in Chonburi, Thailand

Coordinates: 13.3612°N 100.9808°E

Chonkanyanukoon School (Thai: โรงเรียนชลกันยานุกูล, RTGS: Rongrian Chon Kanyanukun, pronounced [rōːŋ.rīan t͡ɕʰōn kān.jāː.núʔ.kūːn]) is a state school in Tambon Bang Pla Soi, Amphoe Mueang Chonburi in Chon Buri.

The school admits female junior high school students (mathayom 1–3, equivalent to grade 7–9), while the upper secondary (mathayom 4–6, equivalent to grade 10–12) part of the school is coeducational.

== History ==
The school was founded at Bang Pla Soi, Mueang Chonburi, Chon Buri, Thailand in BE 2458 to 2460 (1915–1917 CE) by Praya Prasaisuradach who was the Governor of Chonburi Province. (This building now houses Anubanchonburi School). The first Chonkanyanukoon School admitted male and female secondary students (mathayom 1–3, equivalent to grade 7–9). After a while the Ministry of Education decided to separate girl and boy students into different schools. Lacking space, the school split its students into two sites.

The new school was established on 10 September 1936 by using The Sa-tre chonburi “Chonkanyanukoon” School (Thai: โรงเรียนสตรีชลบุรี “ชลกันยานุกูล”) name. In BE 2503 (1960 CE), the high school opened. It also admitted female secondary students (mathayom 1–6, equivalent to grade 7–12).

In BE 2505 (1962 CE), the school moved to its present place thanks to Nat Montasavi, who provided the new building. The school opened an English program in BE 2545 (2002 CE).

Chonkanyanukoon School educates secondary students in mathayom 1-6 levels. The school has an "English Program", "Top Star Program", "Gifted Program" and "Regular Program".
