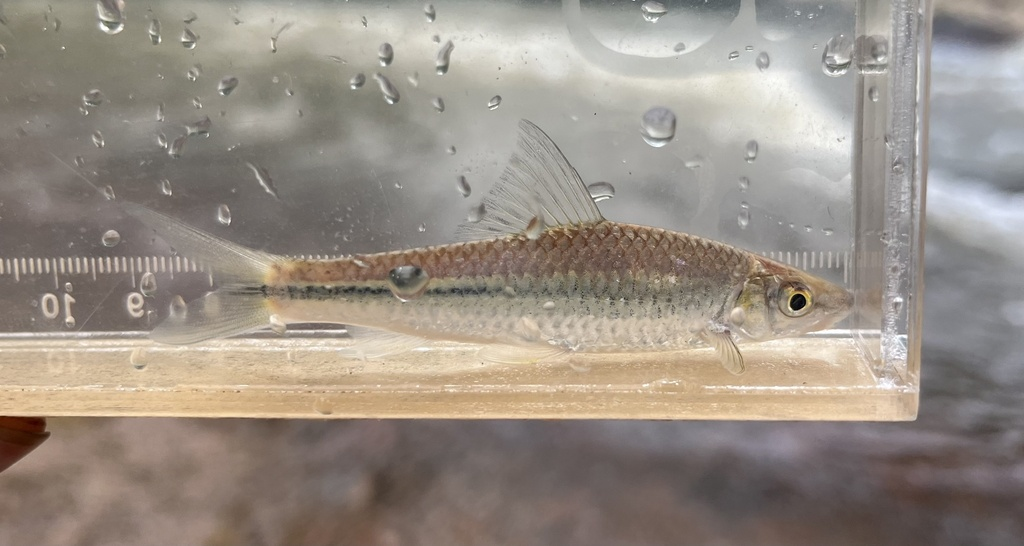

Conservation status
- Least Concern (IUCN 3.1)

Scientific classification
- Kingdom: Animalia
- Phylum: Chordata
- Class: Actinopterygii
- Order: Cypriniformes
- Family: Cyprinidae
- Subfamily: Labeoninae
- Genus: Lobocheilos
- Species: L. rhabdoura

Binomial name
- Lobocheilos rhabdoura (Fowler, 1934)

Synonyms
- Tylognathus rhabdoura Fowler, 1934; Tylognathus cryptopogon Fowler, 1935; Henicorhynchus cryptopogon (Fowler, 1935); Lobocheilos cryptopogon (Fowler, 1935); Gymnostomus cryptopogon (Fowler, 1935); Tylognathus melanotaenia Fowler, 1935; Lobocheilos melanotaenia (Fowler, 1935); Tylognathus quadrilineatus Fowler, 1935; Lobocheilos quadrilineatus (Fowler, 1935); Tylognathus fowleri (Pellegrin & Chevey, 1936); Lobocheilos fowleri (Pellegrin & Chevey, 1936); Tylognathus davisi Fowler, 1937; Lobocheilos davisi (Fowler, 1937); Tylognathus gracilis Fowler, 1937; Lobocheilos gracilis (Fowler, 1937); Tylognathus trangensis Fowler, 1939; Lobocheilos trangensis (Fowler, 1939); Tylognathus delacouri Pellegrin & P.-W. Fang, 1940; Lobocheilos delacouri (Pellegrin & P.-W. Fang, 1940); Lobocheilos cheveyi H. M. Smith, 1945; Lobocheilos cornutus H. M. Smith, 1945; Lobocheilos nigrovittatus H. M. Smith, 1945; Lobocheilos thavili H. M. Smith, 1945

= Lobocheilos rhabdoura =

Species of fish

Lobocheilos rhabdoura is a species of freshwater ray-finned fish belonging to the family Cyprinidae, the family which includes the carps, barbs, minnows and related fishes. This fish is found Southeast Asia where it occurs in the Chao Phraya and Mae Khlong in Thailand; the lower Mekong basin in Thailand, Laos, Cambodia and Viet Nam; the Đồng Nai River in Viet Nam; the Xe Bang Fai River in Laos and in Western Malaysia. L. rhabdoura has a maximum published standard length of 22 cm (8.7 in). It inhabits the lower depths of large and medium-sized streams, typically in reaches with relatively swift current and in rapids. These fishes will enter flooded fields. Its diet consists of periphyton and phytoplankton. It is likeley that this fish spawns at the satrt of the rainly season. It is caught and used in the preparation of fish sauce.
