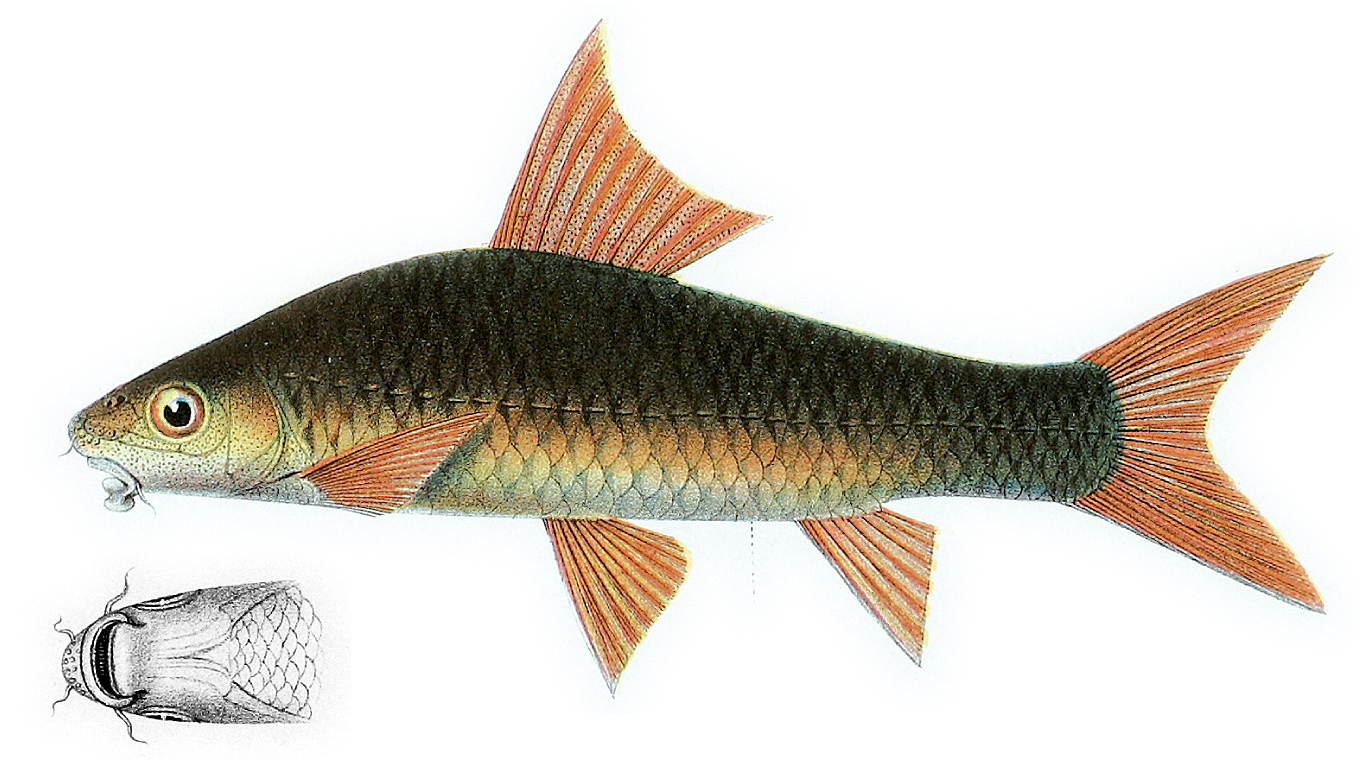
- Lobocheilos lehat

Scientific classification
- Kingdom: Animalia
- Phylum: Chordata
- Class: Actinopterygii
- Division: Teleostei
- Order: Cypriniformes
- Family: Cyprinidae
- Subfamily: Labeoninae
- Genus: Lobocheilos; Bleeker, 1853

Type species
- Labeo falcifer Valenciennes, 1842

Synonyms
- Gobionichthys Bleeker, 1859

= Lobocheilos =

Genus of fishes

Lobocheilos is a genus of fish in the family Cyprinidae native to Asia. (not to be confused with the noctuid moths with Lobocheilos as a synonym).

== Species ==
Lobocheilos contains the following valid species:

- Lobocheilos aurolineatus Ciccotto & H. H. Tan, 2018
- Lobocheilos bo (Popta, 1904)
- Lobocheilos erinaceus Kottelat & H. H. Tan, 2008
- Lobocheilos falcifer (Valenciennes, 1842)
- Lobocheilos ixocheilos Kottelat & Tan, 2008
- Lobocheilos kajanensis (Popta, 1904)
- Lobocheilos lehat Bleeker, 1858
- Lobocheilos ovalis Kottelat & Tan, 2008
- Lobocheilos rhabdoura (Fowler, 1934)
- Lobocheilos schwanefeldii Bleeker, 1854.
- Lobocheilos tenura Kottelat & Tan, 2008
- Lobocheilos terminalis Kottelat & Tan, 2008
- Lobocheilos unicornis Kottelat & Tan, 2008
