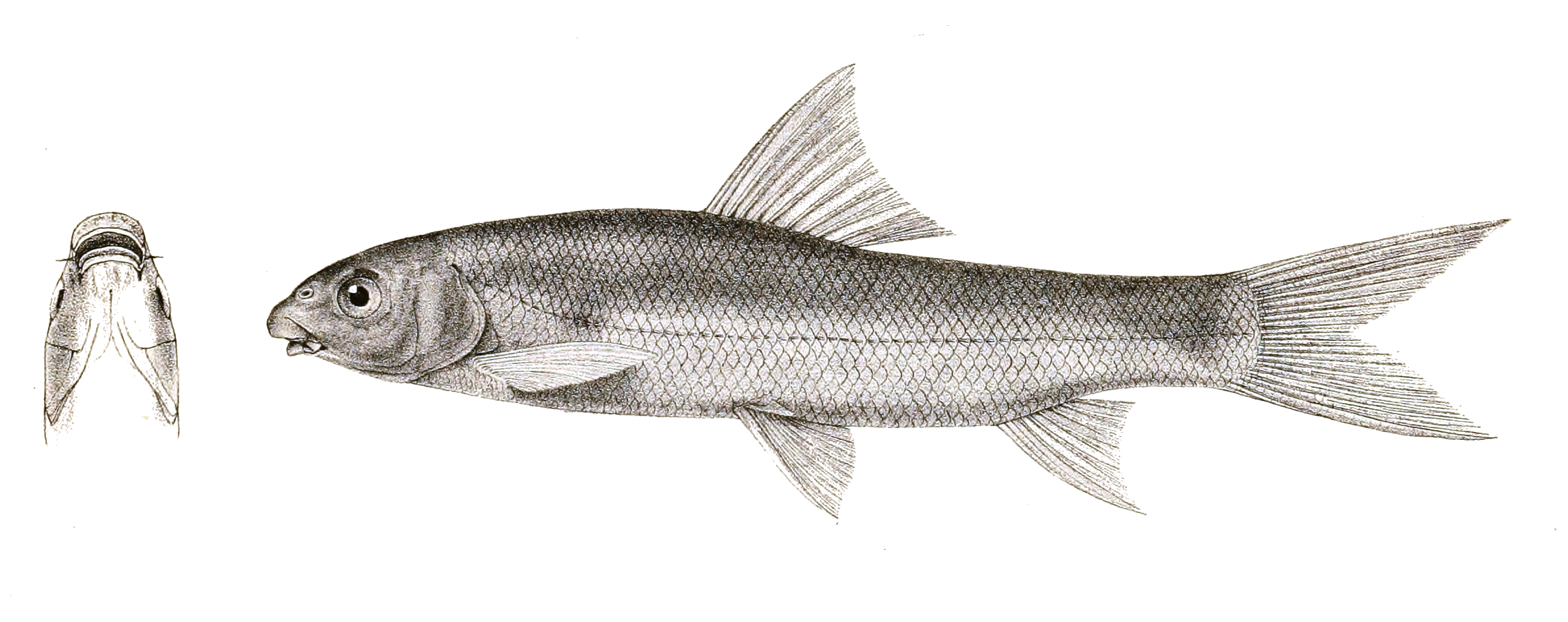

Conservation status
- Least Concern (IUCN 3.1)

Scientific classification
- Domain: Eukaryota
- Kingdom: Animalia
- Phylum: Chordata
- Class: Actinopterygii
- Order: Cypriniformes
- Family: Cyprinidae
- Subfamily: Labeoninae
- Genus: Labeo
- Species: L. boggut

Binomial name
- Labeo boggut (Sykes), 1839

Synonyms
- Chondrostoma boggut Sykes, 1839; Tylognathus striolatus Günther, 1868

= Boggut labeo =

Species of fish

Boggut labeo or the minor carp (Labeo boggut) is an Asian freshwater fish of the family Cyprinidae. It is known from Pakistan, India and Bangladesh.
