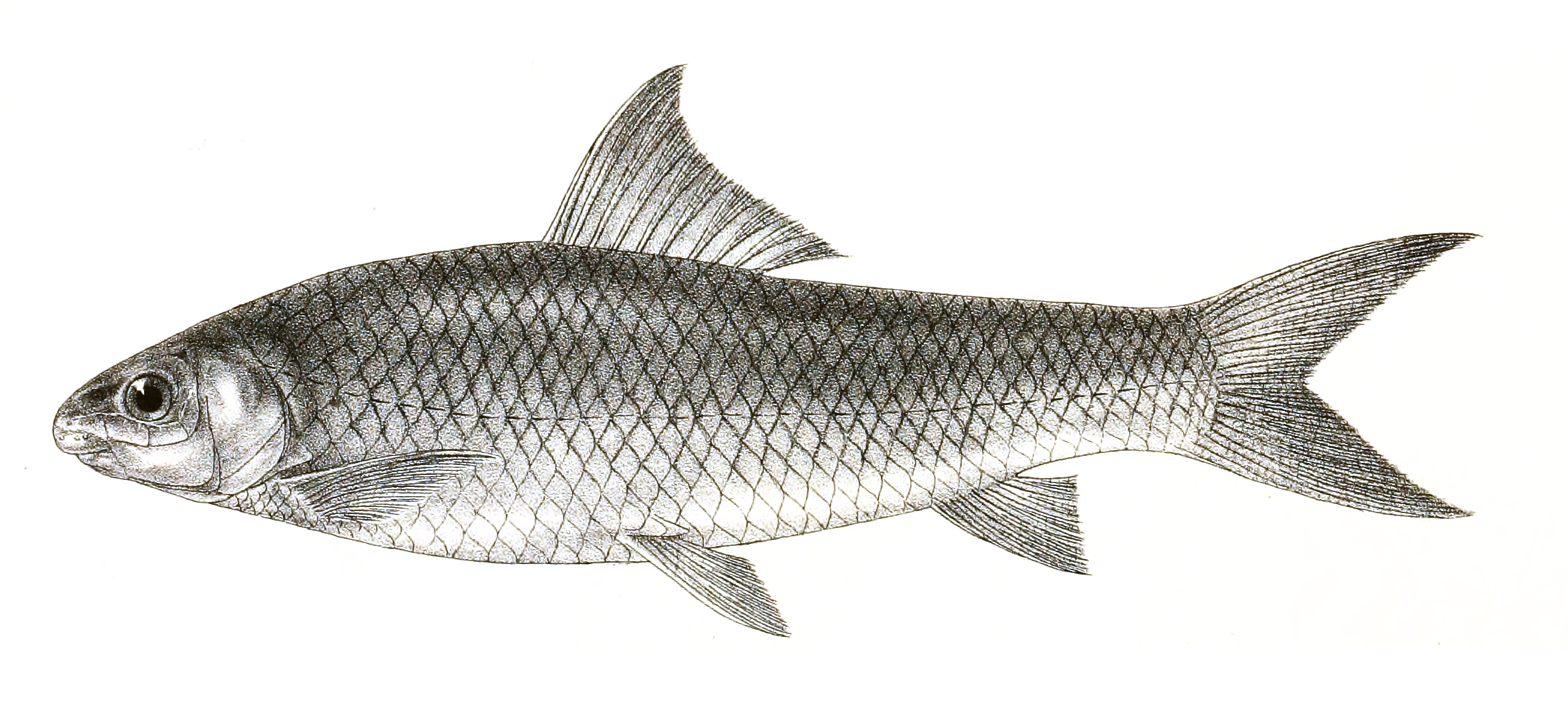

Conservation status
- Least Concern (IUCN 3.1)

Scientific classification
- Kingdom: Animalia
- Phylum: Chordata
- Class: Actinopterygii
- Division: Teleostei
- Order: Cypriniformes
- Family: Cyprinidae
- Subfamily: Labeoninae
- Genus: Gymnostomus
- Species: G. ariza

Binomial name
- Gymnostomus ariza (F. Hamilton, 1807)

Synonyms
- Cyprinus ariza Hamilton, 1807; Cirrhinus ariza (Hamilton, 1807); Labeo ariza (Hamilton, 1807); Tylognathus ariza (Hamilton, 1807); Cyprinus bangon Hamilton, 1807; Gobio hamiltonii Jerdon, 1849; Gobio bovianus Jerdon, 1849

= Gymnostomus ariza =

Species of fish

Gymnostomus ariza, the Reba or ariza labeo, is a cyprinid fish found in India, Nepal, Bangladesh, Afghanistan, and Pakistan.

Gymnostomus ariza occurs in clear rivers and tanks, feeding on plankton and detritus. It breeds in flooded shallows in June–September. Its growth is fairly rapid; and it can reach lengths of about 30 cm in natural waters. The males are smaller than females. It is grown in aquaculture ponds in India where breeding is induced by hypophysation, a technique of artificially encouraging fish to reproduce by removing the hypophysis or pituitary gland from a fish, preparing it and then injecting the preparation into another mature fish, of either sex, to promote final maturation and spawning. However, the fry of this species are readily available in July–September in rivers such as the Cauvery and Bhavani, especially at dawn and dusk. These are collected to stock ponds and in even seasonal waters due to their rapid growth.

Gymnostomus ariza is found in waters on the Indus plain and adjoining hilly areas in Pakistan; in the Ganges-Brahmaputra basins in India, Nepal, and Bangladesh; the basins of the Mahanadi, Krishna and Cauvery, as well as some smaller basins in southern India; the Karnapouli and adjacent smaller basins in Chittagong Hill Tracts in Bangladesh. It has also been reported from Myanmar.

Gymnostomus ariza has thin stripes lying mainly dorsally of the lateral line; larger specimens often have a broad mid-lateral stripe. The colour of this species in life is variable, from dull dirty white or greyish to silvery or yellow, and the narrow stripes can vary in their distinctiveness.
