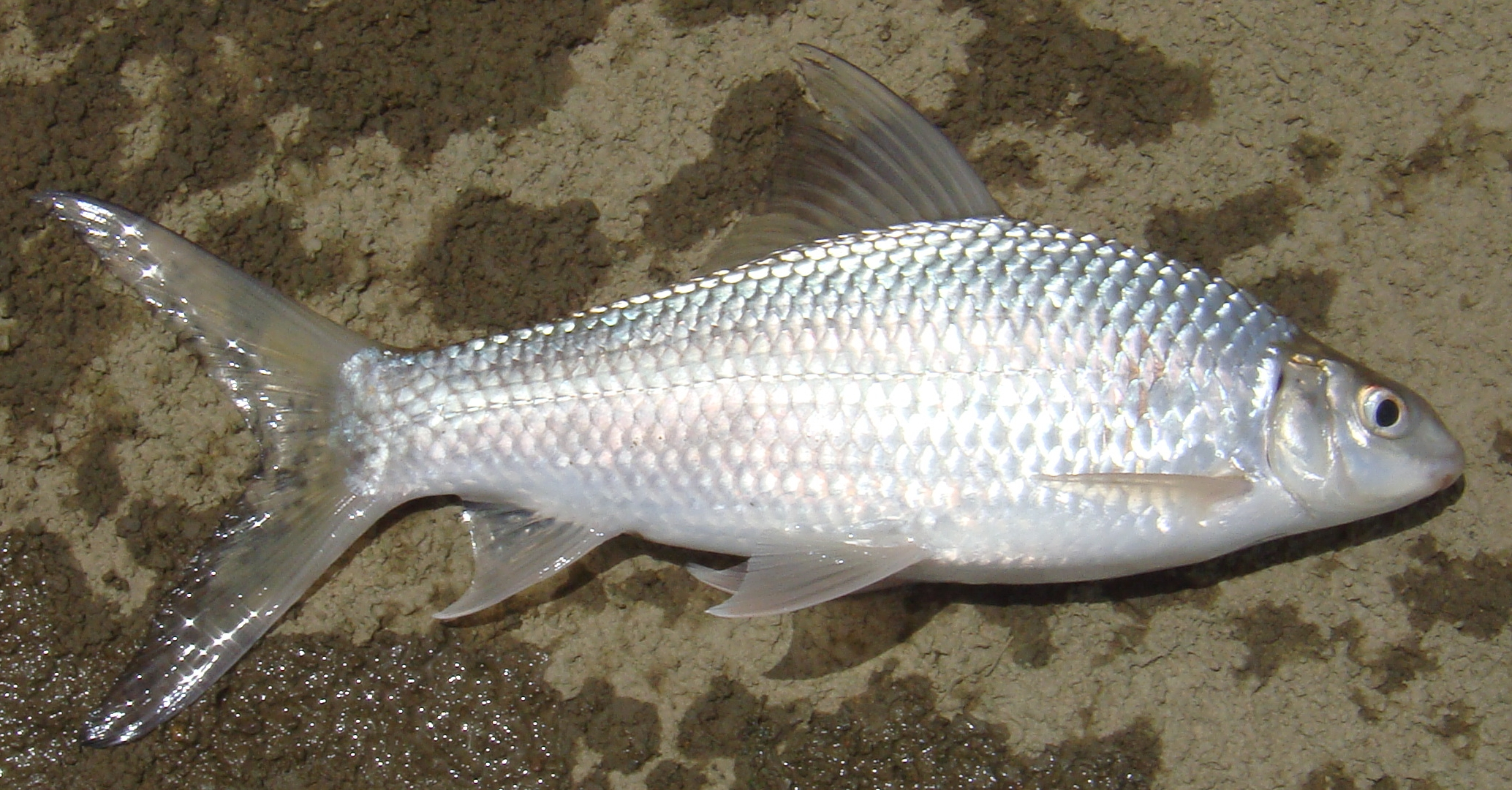
- From the Nandu River

Conservation status
- Vulnerable (IUCN 3.1)

Scientific classification
- Kingdom: Animalia
- Phylum: Chordata
- Class: Actinopterygii
- Order: Cypriniformes
- Family: Cyprinidae
- Subfamily: Labeoninae
- Genus: Cirrhinus
- Species: C. cirrhosus

Binomial name
- Cirrhinus cirrhosus (Bloch, 1795)

Synonyms
- Cirrhina blochii Valenciennes, 1842; Cirrhinus blochii Valenciennes, 1842; Cirrhinus chaudhryi Srivastava, 1968; Cirrhinus cuvierii Jerdon, 1849; Cirrhinus horai Lakshmanan, 1966; Cyprinus cirrhosus Bloch, 1795; Dangila leschenaultii Valenciennes, 1842; Henicorhynchus horai (Lakshmanan, 1966)>; Mrigala buchanani Bleeker, 1860

= Mrigal carp =

Species of fish

The mrigal carp (Cirrhinus cirrhosus), (Bengali: মৃগেল, romanized: mrigél) also known as the white carp, is a species of ray-finned fish in the carp family. Native to streams and rivers in India, the only surviving wild population is in the Cauvery River, leading to its IUCN rating as vulnerable. It is widely aquafarmed, and introduced populations exist outside its native range. It reaches a maximum length of 1 m (3.3 ft). This species and Cirrhinus mrigala are considered distinct.

== Aquaculture ==
Mrigal is popular as a food fish and an important aquacultured freshwater species throughout South Asia. It is widely farmed as a component of a polyculture system of three Indian major carps, along with roho labeo and the catla. It was introduced by aquaculture across India started in the early 1940s, and later to other Asian countries. The mrigal carp fails to breed naturally in ponds, thus induced breeding is done.

The Indian carps are considered as a delicacy compared to other exotic carp species also cultured in Asia, and sell for higher prices. Reported annual aquafarming production numbers of mrigal carp since the early 1990s have varied between 250,000 and 550,000 tonnes, with no clear trend. India and Bangladesh are the largest producers. In Pakistan, this fish is known as morakhi or moree. In Nepal it is called naini.

The Mrigal carp was brought to Guangdong province in southern China for aquaculture, but it is now considered an invasive species in the Pearl River basin.

== Habitat and ecology ==
Mrigal is an benthopelagic and potamodromous plankton feeder. It inhabits fast flowing streams and rivers, but can tolerate high levels of salinity. Spawning occurs in marginal areas of the water bodies with a depth of 50 to 100 centimetres (20 to 39 in) over a sand or clay substrate. A 6-kilogram (13 lb) female can lay a million eggs. This fish has a rapid growth rate; by the age of two, individuals can reach a length of 60 centimetres (24 in) and can weigh as much as 2 kilograms (4.4 lb).
