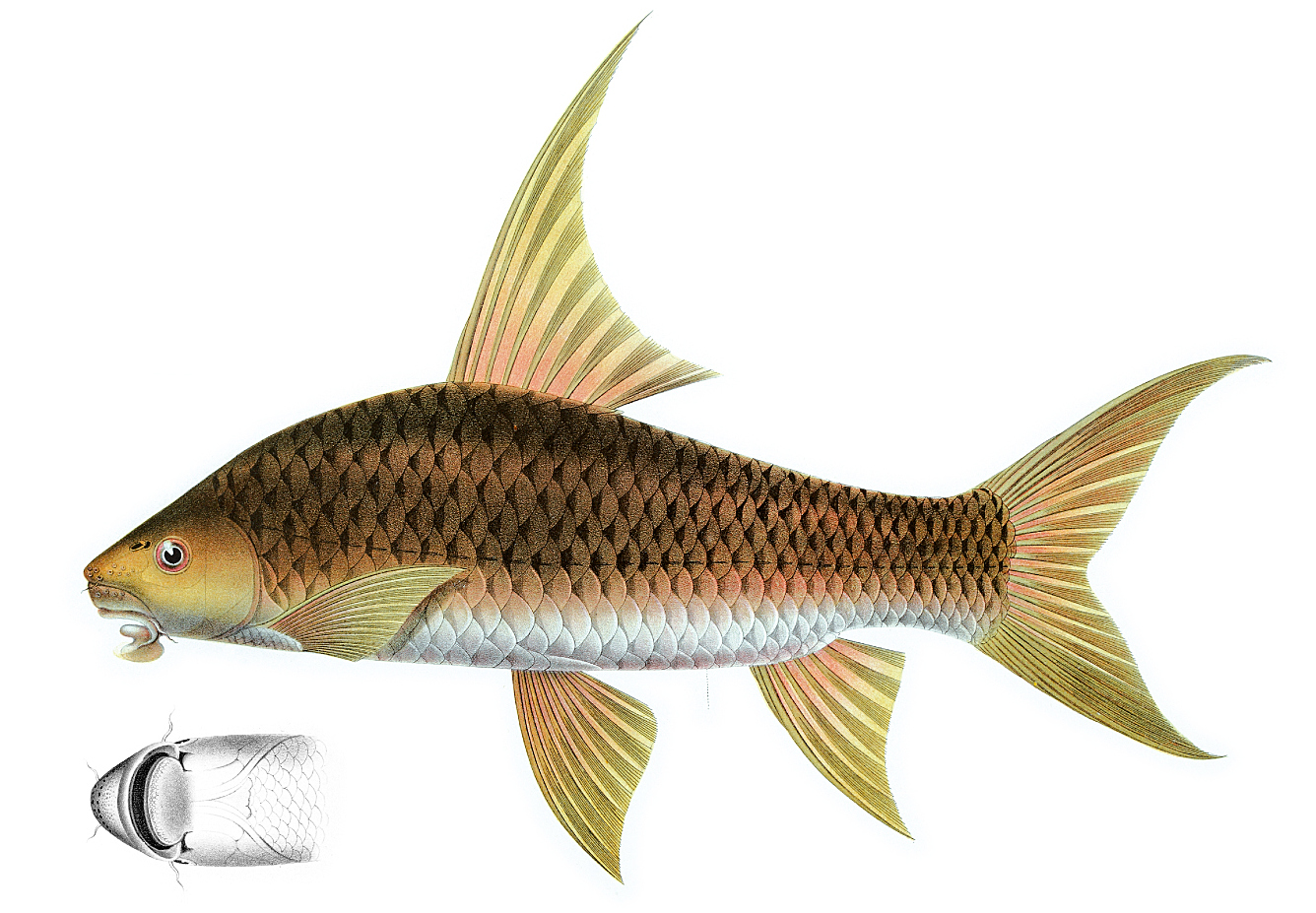

Conservation status
- Vulnerable (IUCN 3.1)

Scientific classification
- Kingdom: Animalia
- Phylum: Chordata
- Class: Actinopterygii
- Order: Cypriniformes
- Family: Cyprinidae
- Genus: Lobocheilos
- Species: L. falcifer

Binomial name
- Lobocheilos falcifer (Valenciennes, 1842)

Synonyms
- Labeo falcifer Valenciennes, 1842; Tylognathus falcifer (Valenciennes, 1842); Lobocheilus falcifer Kuhl & van Hasselt, 1823; Labeo hispidus Valenciennes, 1842; Lobocheilos hispidus (Valenciennes, 1842); Tylognathus hispidus (Valenciennes, 1842); Chondrostoma lipocheilos Valenciennes, 1844; Gobio microcephalus Bleeker, 1857; Gobio javanicus Bleeker, 1857; Barbus hasseltii Bleeker, 1857

= Lobocheilos falcifer =

Species of fish

Lobocheilos falcifer is a species of freshwater ray-finned fish belonging to the family Cyprinidae, the family which includes the carps, barbs, minnows and related fishes. This species is endemic to Java.
