= African carp =

African carp is a common name that may refer to several different species of fishes:

- The Tana Labeo, Labeo mesops
- The Cornish jack, Mormyrops anguilloides
- Labeo brachypoma
- Labeo coubie
- Labeo cylindricus
- Labeo parvus
- Labeo senegalensis
- Mormyrops oudoti

== See also ==
- Carp
