= Labeo lividus =

Scientific classification
- Kingdom: Animalia
- Phylum: Chordata
- Class: Actinopterygii
- Order: Cypriniformes
- Family: Cyprinidae
- Genus: Labeo
- Species: L. lividus

Binomial name
- Labeo lividus Roberts & Stewart, 1976

Species of fish

Labeo lividus is a species of freshwater fish belonging to the genus Labeo. It is found in the lower Congo River. It is sometimes considered conspecific with Labeo barbatus.
