= Labeo djourae =

Scientific classification
- Kingdom: Animalia
- Phylum: Chordata
- Class: Actinopterygii
- Order: Cypriniformes
- Family: Cyprinidae
- Genus: Labeo
- Species: L. djourae

Binomial name
- Labeo djourae Blache & Miton, 1960

Species of fish

Labeo djourae is a species of freshwater fish belonging to the genus Labeo. It is endemic to the Benue River in Chad. It is sometimes considered conspecific with Labeo parvus.
