= Labeo latebra =

Scientific classification
- Domain: Eukaryota
- Kingdom: Animalia
- Phylum: Chordata
- Class: Actinopterygii
- Order: Cypriniformes
- Family: Cyprinidae
- Genus: Labeo
- Species: L. latebra

Binomial name
- Labeo latebra Moritz & Neumann, 2017

Species of fish

Labeo latebra is a species of freshwater fish belonging to the genus Labeo. It is endemic to the upper Nile basin in Sudan.
