= Labeo kaage =

Scientific classification
- Kingdom: Animalia
- Phylum: Chordata
- Class: Actinopterygii
- Order: Cypriniformes
- Family: Cyprinidae
- Genus: Labeo
- Species: L. kaage

Binomial name
- Labeo kaage Kumar, Ravi, Krishnaprasoon & Basheer, 2026

Species of ray-finned fish

Labeo kaage is a species of riverine freshwater fish within the family Cyprinidae. Described in 2026, it is native to India.

== Habitat ==
The species is found in freshwater rivers and streams of India in the Cauvery River basin.
