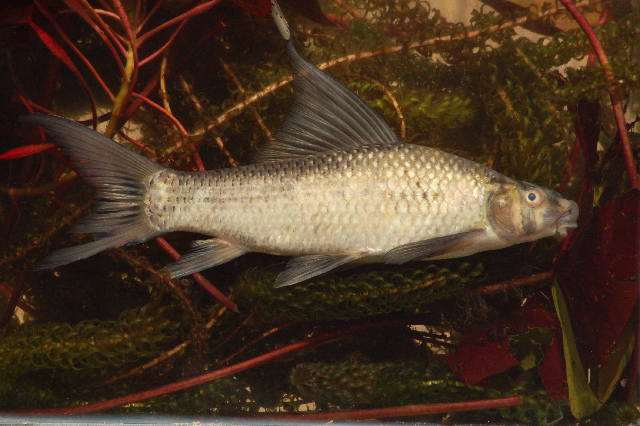

Conservation status
- Least Concern (IUCN 3.1)

Scientific classification
- Domain: Eukaryota
- Kingdom: Animalia
- Phylum: Chordata
- Class: Actinopterygii
- Order: Cypriniformes
- Family: Cyprinidae
- Subfamily: Labeoninae
- Genus: Labeo
- Species: L. lunatus

Binomial name
- Labeo lunatus R. A. Jubb, 1963

= Upper Zambezi labeo =

Species of fish

The Upper Zambezi labeo (Labeo lunatus) is a species of cyprinid fish of the genus Labeo native to southern Africa.

== Distribution ==
This species occurs in the Upper Zambezi and Okavango Rivers, in Angola; Botswana; Namibia; Zambia and Zimbabwe. It is a common species but the population varies with the fluctuations in the flooding of the river systems.

== Habitat and ecology ==
This species inhabits rocky areas of streams as well as large soft-bottomed lagoons in floodplains. It feeds mostly on algae, aufwuchs and detritus. It is found over quieter rocky substrates and generally avoids rocky rapids. Its prefers the main channel of the rivers and has been recorded throughout the floodplain system It is a shoaling species which breeds in summer, most likely in flooded marginal habitats.

== Description ==
This species can reach a length of 40 centimetres (16 in) SL. The maximum recorded weight of this species is 2.5 kilograms (5.5 lb). It is greenish or silvery grey with parallel lines along the body formed by the dark bases of the scales, it also has blackish membranes on the fins. The fleshy outer lips are covered in papillae with the inner edges being horny with sharper edges. The dorsal fin has four spines and 9-11 soft rays, while the anal fin has three spines and five soft rays.

== Relationship to Humans ==
L. lunatus is important to local artisanal fisheries. The species' population in the Upper Zambezi has declined probably as a result of overexploitation by fisheries catching the fish on their spawning runs. In addition, fish weirs set across the waters draining from floodplains catch large numbers of young fish returning to the rivers as the flood waters recede.
