= Labeo kirkii =

Conservation status
- Least Concern (IUCN 3.1)

Scientific classification
- Kingdom: Animalia
- Phylum: Chordata
- Class: Actinopterygii
- Order: Cypriniformes
- Family: Cyprinidae
- Subfamily: Labeoninae
- Genus: Labeo
- Species: L. kirkii

Binomial name
- Labeo kirkii Boulenger, 1903

Species of fish

Labeo kirkii is a fish in genus Labeo from the Congo River in the Democratic Republic of the Congo and the Rovuma River on the border between Tanzania and Mozambique.
