= Labeo macrostoma =

Conservation status
- Least Concern (IUCN 3.1)

Scientific classification
- Domain: Eukaryota
- Kingdom: Animalia
- Phylum: Chordata
- Class: Actinopterygii
- Order: Cypriniformes
- Family: Cyprinidae
- Subfamily: Labeoninae
- Genus: Labeo
- Species: L. macrostoma

Binomial name
- Labeo macrostoma Boulenger, 1898

Synonyms
- Labeo brichardi Poll, 1959

Species of fish

Labeo macrostoma is fish in genus Labeo from the Congo Basin.
