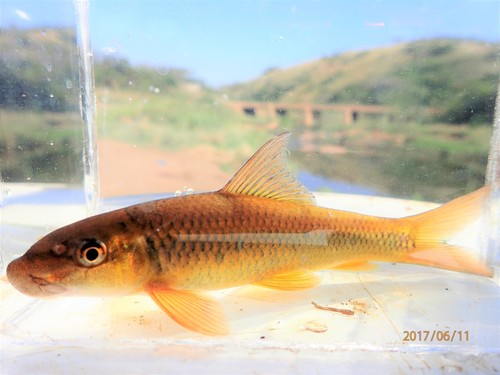

Conservation status
- Least Concern (IUCN 3.1)

Scientific classification
- Kingdom: Animalia
- Phylum: Chordata
- Class: Actinopterygii
- Order: Cypriniformes
- Family: Cyprinidae
- Genus: Labeo
- Species: L. molybdinus

Binomial name
- Labeo molybdinus du Plessis, 1963

= Leaden labeo =

Species of fish

The leaden labeo (Labeo molybdinus) is an African freshwater fish in family Cyprinidae. It is found in southern Africa from the Limpopo River, Incomati River, Usutu River, Tugela River, and the Zambezi River systems.
