= Labeo cyclopinnis =

Conservation status
- Least Concern (IUCN 3.1)

Scientific classification
- Kingdom: Animalia
- Phylum: Chordata
- Class: Actinopterygii
- Order: Cypriniformes
- Family: Cyprinidae
- Subfamily: Labeoninae
- Genus: Labeo
- Species: L. cyclopinnis

Binomial name
- Labeo cyclopinnis Nichols & Griscom, 1917

Species of fish

Labeo cyclopinnis is fish in genus Labeo. It is only known from the rapids of the Middle Congo River and the Ubangi river in Africa.
