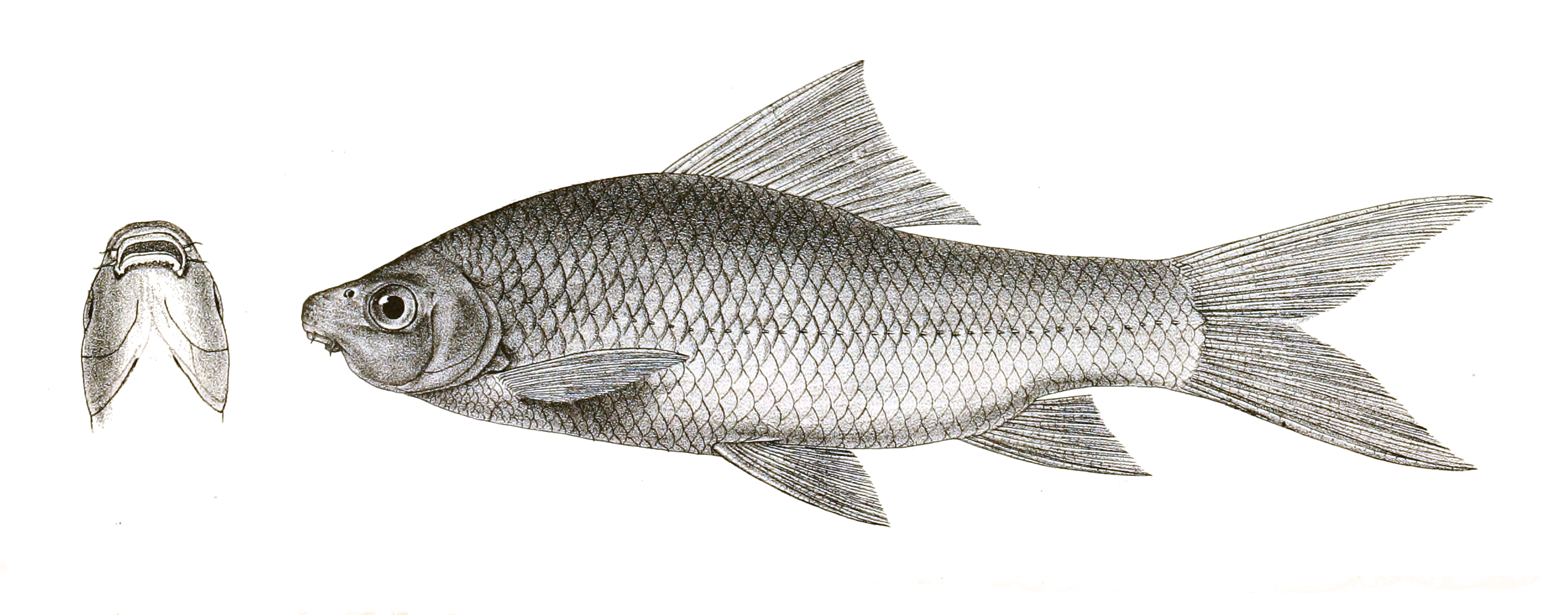

Conservation status
- Least Concern (IUCN 3.1)

Scientific classification
- Domain: Eukaryota
- Kingdom: Animalia
- Phylum: Chordata
- Class: Actinopterygii
- Order: Cypriniformes
- Family: Cyprinidae
- Subfamily: Labeoninae
- Genus: Labeo
- Species: L. kontius

Binomial name
- Labeo kontius Jerdon, 1849

Synonyms
- Cyprinus kontius Jerdon, 1849; Cirrhinus rubropunctatus Jerdon, 1849

= Pigmouth carp =

Species of fish

The pigmouth carp (Labeo kontius) is a cyprinid, benthopelagic, tropical fish found in India.
