= Labeo dhonti =

Conservation status
- Least Concern (IUCN 3.1)

Scientific classification
- Kingdom: Animalia
- Phylum: Chordata
- Class: Actinopterygii
- Order: Cypriniformes
- Family: Cyprinidae
- Genus: Labeo
- Species: L. dhonti

Binomial name
- Labeo dhonti Boulenger, 1920

Species of fish

Labeo dhonti is fish in genus Labeo from the southern Congo Basin in Angola, the Democratic Republic of the Congo and Tanzania.
