= Labeo rectipinnis =

Conservation status
- Vulnerable (IUCN 3.1)

Scientific classification
- Kingdom: Animalia
- Phylum: Chordata
- Class: Actinopterygii
- Order: Cypriniformes
- Family: Cyprinidae
- Subfamily: Labeoninae
- Genus: Labeo
- Species: L. rectipinnis

Binomial name
- Labeo rectipinnis Tshibwabwa, 1997

Species of fish

Labeo rectipinnis is a species of fish in the genus Labeo.

Its distribution is the lower reaches of the Congo River in Africa.
