= Labeo sorex =

Conservation status
- Data Deficient (IUCN 3.1)

Scientific classification
- Kingdom: Animalia
- Phylum: Chordata
- Class: Actinopterygii
- Order: Cypriniformes
- Family: Cyprinidae
- Subfamily: Labeoninae
- Genus: Labeo
- Species: L. sorex

Binomial name
- Labeo sorex Nichols & Griscom, 1917

Species of fish

Labeo sorex is a species of cyprinid fish from the genus Labeo found in rapids of the Congo River Basin in Africa.
