= Labeo boulengeri =

Conservation status
- Data Deficient (IUCN 3.1)

Scientific classification
- Kingdom: Animalia
- Phylum: Chordata
- Class: Actinopterygii
- Order: Cypriniformes
- Family: Cyprinidae
- Subfamily: Labeoninae
- Genus: Labeo
- Species: L. boulengeri

Binomial name
- Labeo boulengeri Vinciguerra, 1912

Species of fish

Labeo boulengeri is a fish in genus Labeo, a genus of carp. Like most fish of its genus, it is a generally tropical fish. It inhabits the Uebi Scelebi river of Ethiopia. It has a maximum length of 22.5 cm.
