= Labeo rouaneti =

Conservation status
- Vulnerable (IUCN 3.1)

Scientific classification
- Kingdom: Animalia
- Phylum: Chordata
- Class: Actinopterygii
- Order: Cypriniformes
- Family: Cyprinidae
- Subfamily: Labeoninae
- Genus: Labeo
- Species: L. rouaneti

Binomial name
- Labeo rouaneti Daget, 1962

Species of fish

Labeo rouaneti is a species of ray-finned fish in the genus Labeo from Guinea.
