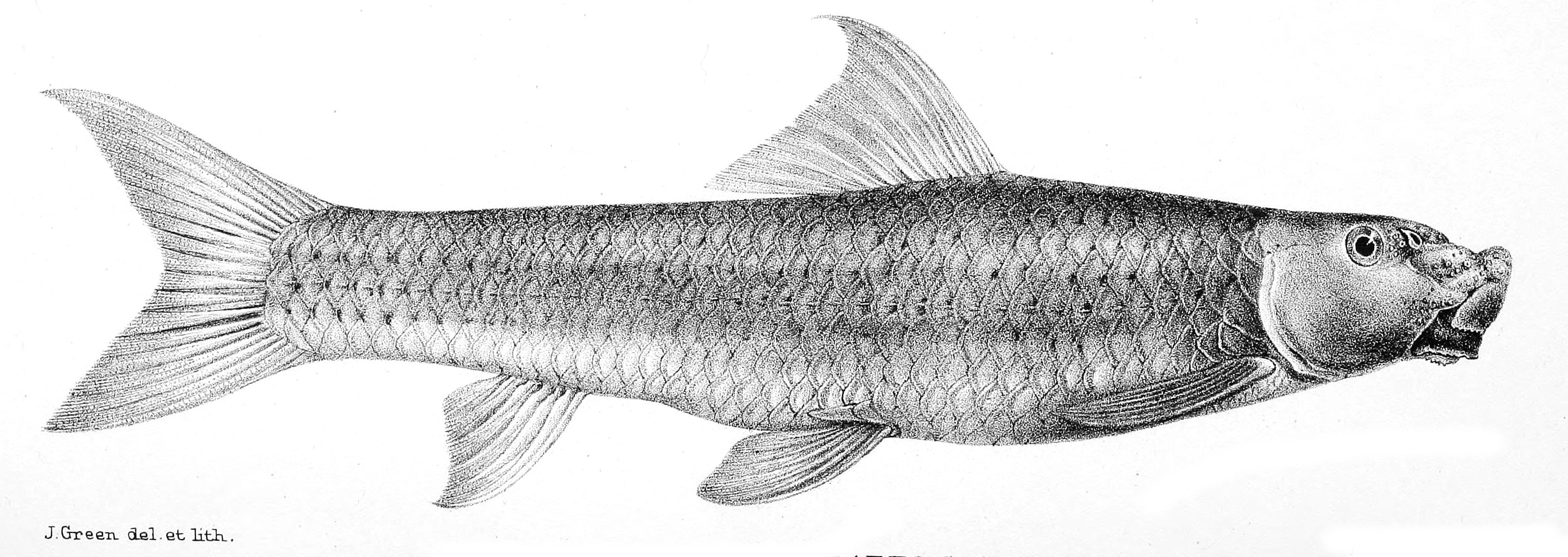

Conservation status
- Least Concern (IUCN 3.1)

Scientific classification
- Kingdom: Animalia
- Phylum: Chordata
- Class: Actinopterygii
- Order: Cypriniformes
- Family: Cyprinidae
- Subfamily: Labeoninae
- Genus: Labeo
- Species: L. annectens

Binomial name
- Labeo annectens Boulenger, 1903

= Labeo annectens =

Species of fish

Labeo annectens is a species of fish in the family Cyprinidae, the carps and minnows. It is native to central Africa, where it occurs in several river basins, including the Congo River basin.

This fish is known to reach a maximum length of 48.5 centimeters. It has a long, rounded snout with a fleshy appendix at the end.

This species is a food fish. It is widespread and not considered threatened.
