= Labeo greenii =

Conservation status
- Least Concern (IUCN 3.1)

Scientific classification
- Kingdom: Animalia
- Phylum: Chordata
- Class: Actinopterygii
- Order: Cypriniformes
- Family: Cyprinidae
- Subfamily: Labeoninae
- Genus: Labeo
- Species: L. greenii

Binomial name
- Labeo greenii Boulenger, 1902

Species of fish

Labeo greenii is a species of fish in the genus Labeo from the Congo River system in central Africa.
