= Labeo indramontri =

Conservation status
- Data Deficient (IUCN 3.1)

Scientific classification
- Kingdom: Animalia
- Phylum: Chordata
- Class: Actinopterygii
- Order: Cypriniformes
- Family: Cyprinidae
- Subfamily: Labeoninae
- Genus: Labeo
- Species: L. indramontri

Binomial name
- Labeo indramontri H. M. Smith, 1945

Species of fish

Labeo indramontri is fish in genus Labeo from the Chao Praya and Mekong rivers on south-east Asia.
