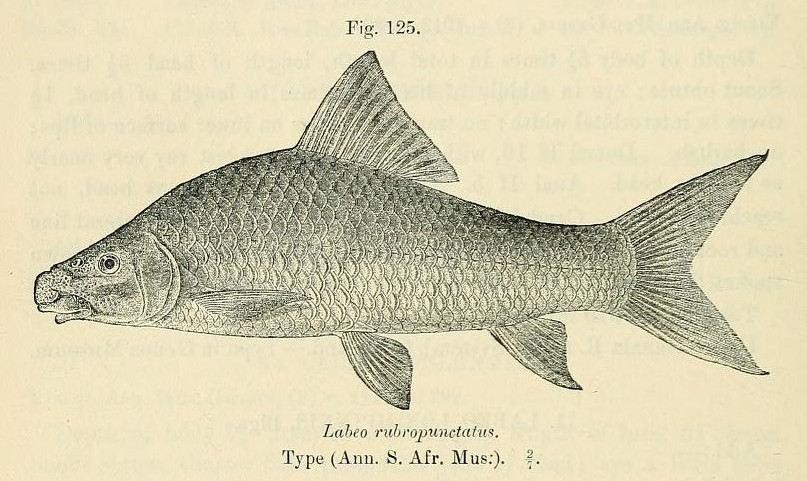

Conservation status
- Least Concern (IUCN 3.1)

Scientific classification
- Kingdom: Animalia
- Phylum: Chordata
- Class: Actinopterygii
- Order: Cypriniformes
- Family: Cyprinidae
- Subfamily: Labeoninae
- Genus: Labeo
- Species: L. congoro

Binomial name
- Labeo congoro W. K. H. Peters, 1852

Synonyms
- Labeo rubropunctatus Gilchrist & Thompson, 1913; Labeo ulangensis Steindachner, 1914

= Purple labeo =

Species of fish

The purple labeo or purple mudsucker (Labeo congoro) is a relatively large African freshwater fish that occurs in rocky stretches of large rivers, including the Zambezi, Incomati and parts of the Congo. Growing up to 41.5 cm long, it feeds on algae and other encrusting organisms, scraping them from boulders and other hard surfaces, including the backs of hippopotamuses. Rather than grazing randomly the Purple Labeo moves along in relatively straight lines as it feeds, leaving characteristic tracks that show where it has been. Although it has been little studied in the wild it is known to migrate upstream when rivers are in flood in order to breed.
