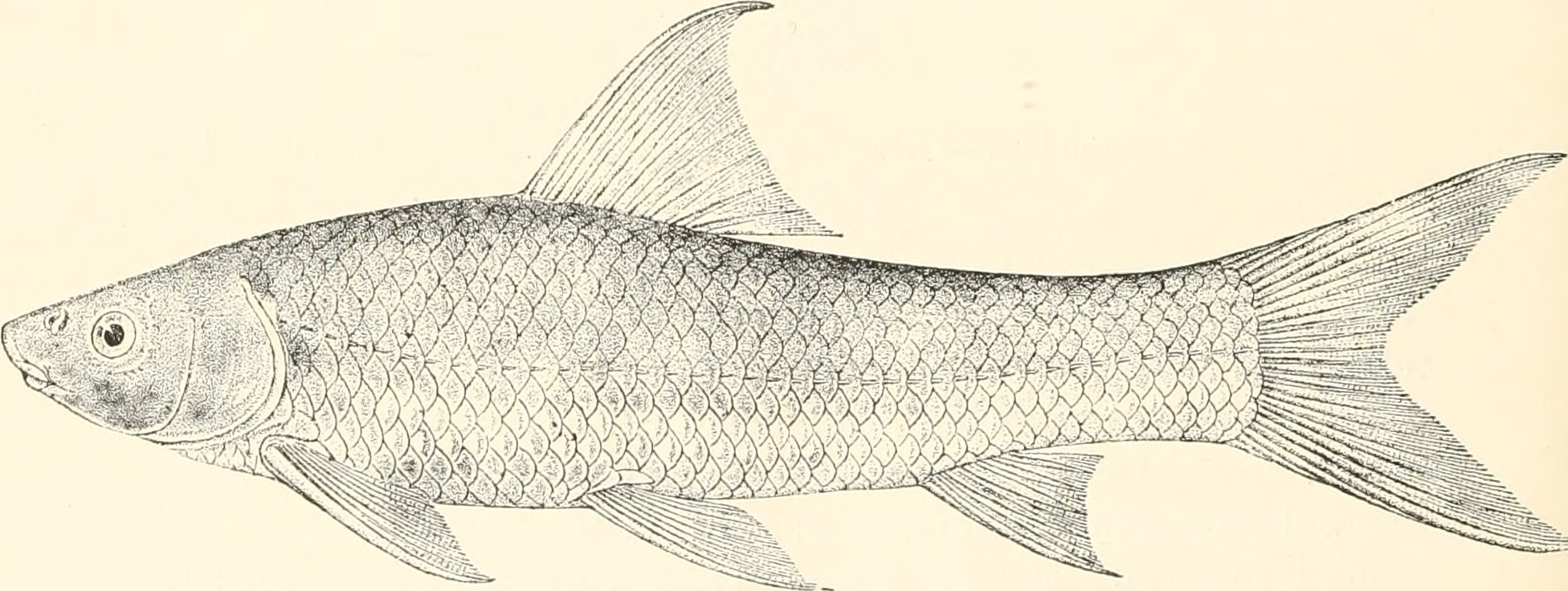

Conservation status
- Data Deficient (IUCN 3.1)

Scientific classification
- Kingdom: Animalia
- Phylum: Chordata
- Class: Actinopterygii
- Order: Cypriniformes
- Family: Cyprinidae
- Subfamily: Labeoninae
- Genus: Labeo
- Species: L. ruddi

Binomial name
- Labeo ruddi Boulenger, 1907

= Silver labeo =

Species of fish

The silver labeo (Labeo ruddi) is an African species of freshwater fish in the family Cyprinidae. It can reach a length up to 30 cm and weight of 1 kg.

== Distribution and habitat ==
Silver labeo can be found in the lowveld stretches of the Limpopo and Incomati rivers (South Africa, Eswatini, Mozambique, Zimbabwe), and in a geographically distinct Cunene River population on the Angola–Namibia border.

The silver labeo prefers deeper waters in or associated with main river channels and off channel pools, and is found over sand or mud bottoms. In the rainy season it will move upstream for breeding.
