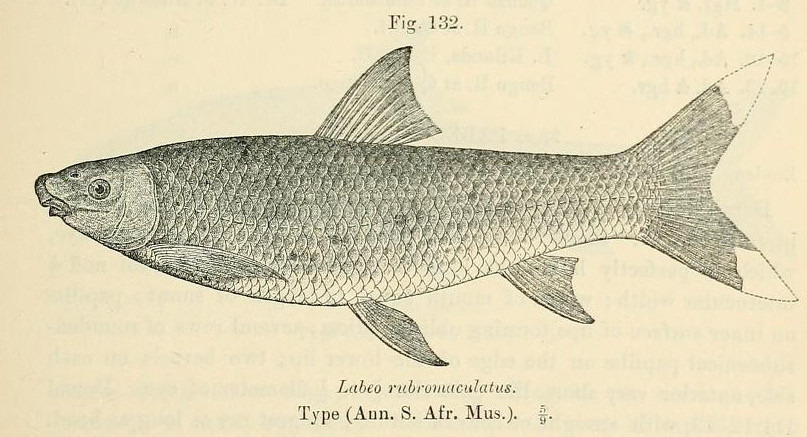

Conservation status
- Vulnerable (IUCN 3.1)

Scientific classification
- Kingdom: Animalia
- Phylum: Chordata
- Class: Actinopterygii
- Order: Cypriniformes
- Family: Cyprinidae
- Subfamily: Labeoninae
- Genus: Labeo
- Species: L. rubromaculatus

Binomial name
- Labeo rubromaculatus Gilchrist & W. W. Thompson, 1913

= Tugela labeo =

Species of fish

The Tugela labeo (Labeo rubromaculatus) is a South African species of freshwater cyprinid fish.

== Distribution and biology ==
The fish is endemic to the Tugela River system in South Africa. It prefers deep pools and slow-flowing parts of the rivers in which it lives. The fish feed on green algae, detritus and diatoms. They fish migrate upstream in shoals during spring and summer to be able to breed. A large volume of small eggs get laid and the young fish grow up in shallow, still waters.

== Appearance ==
The fish has two pairs of tentacles around the mouth. The dorsal, pectoral and pelvic scales are small. The sub-adult fish has a silver colour. The adults are olive-grey with a golden-brown tint on the scales.

The fish reaches up to 50 cm long and the South African angling record stands at 1.95 kg.
