= Labeo luluae =

Conservation status
- Data Deficient (IUCN 3.1)

Scientific classification
- Kingdom: Animalia
- Phylum: Chordata
- Class: Actinopterygii
- Order: Cypriniformes
- Family: Cyprinidae
- Subfamily: Labeoninae
- Genus: Labeo
- Species: L. luluae

Binomial name
- Labeo luluae Fowler, 1930

Species of fish

Labeo luluae is fish in genus Labeo which has only been recorded from the Lulua River and the Aruwimi River in the Congo Basin.
