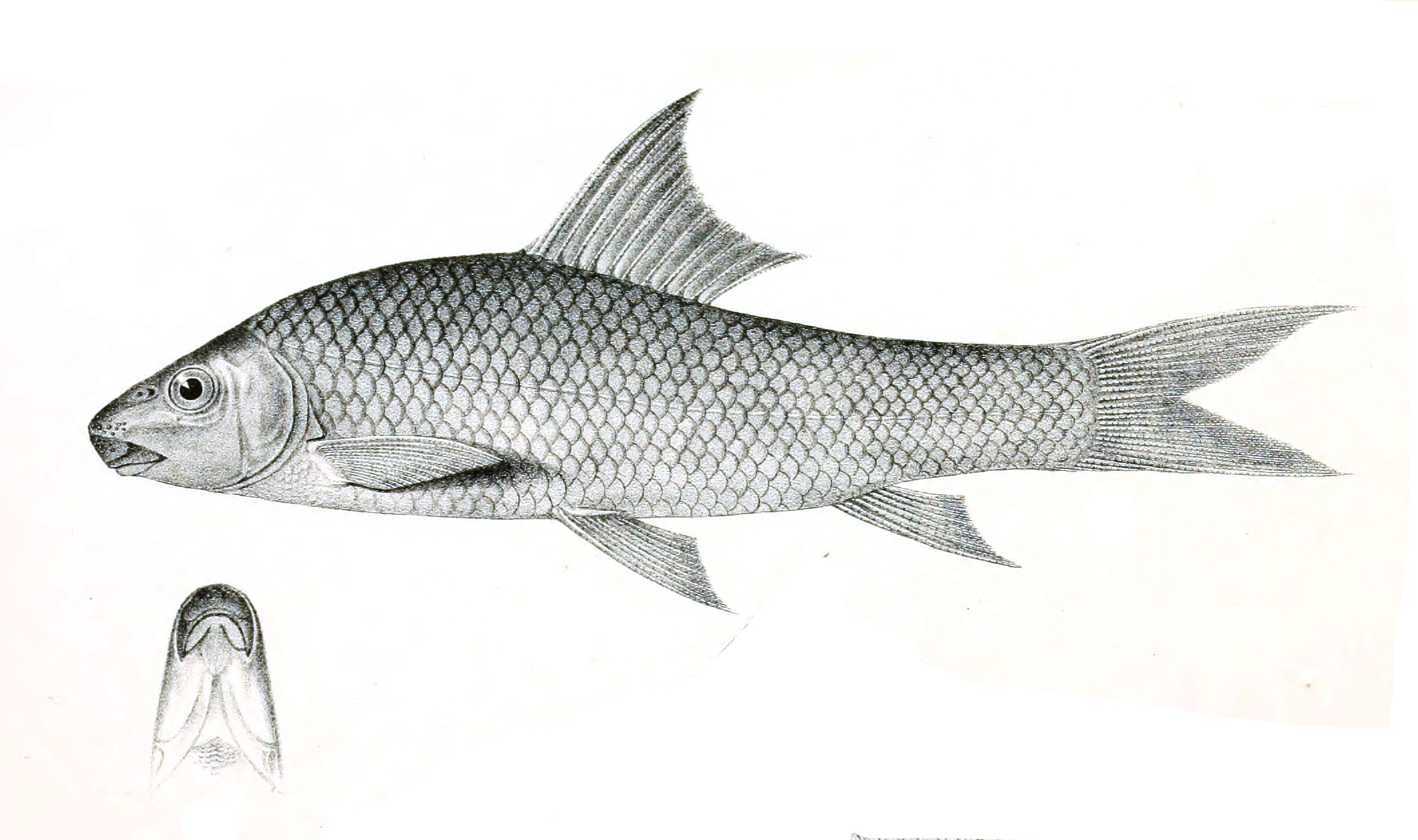

Conservation status
- Near Threatened (IUCN 3.1)

Scientific classification
- Kingdom: Animalia
- Phylum: Chordata
- Class: Actinopterygii
- Order: Cypriniformes
- Family: Cyprinidae
- Subfamily: Labeoninae
- Genus: Labeo
- Species: L. pangusia

Binomial name
- Labeo pangusia (F. Hamilton, 1822)

Synonyms
- Cyprinus pangusia Hamilton, 1822; Gobio pangusia (Hamilton, 1822); Labeo kunki Chaudhuri, 1912

= Labeo pangusia =

Species of fish

Labeo pangusia is a species of fish in the genus Labeo. It occurs in mountain streams, lakes, river and ponds in northern India, Bangladesh, Pakistan, Bhutan and Nepal. Its populations are declining, the main cause seems to be the damming of the waters it lives in so that explosives can be set to catch other fish. This species is of minor importance for human consumption.
