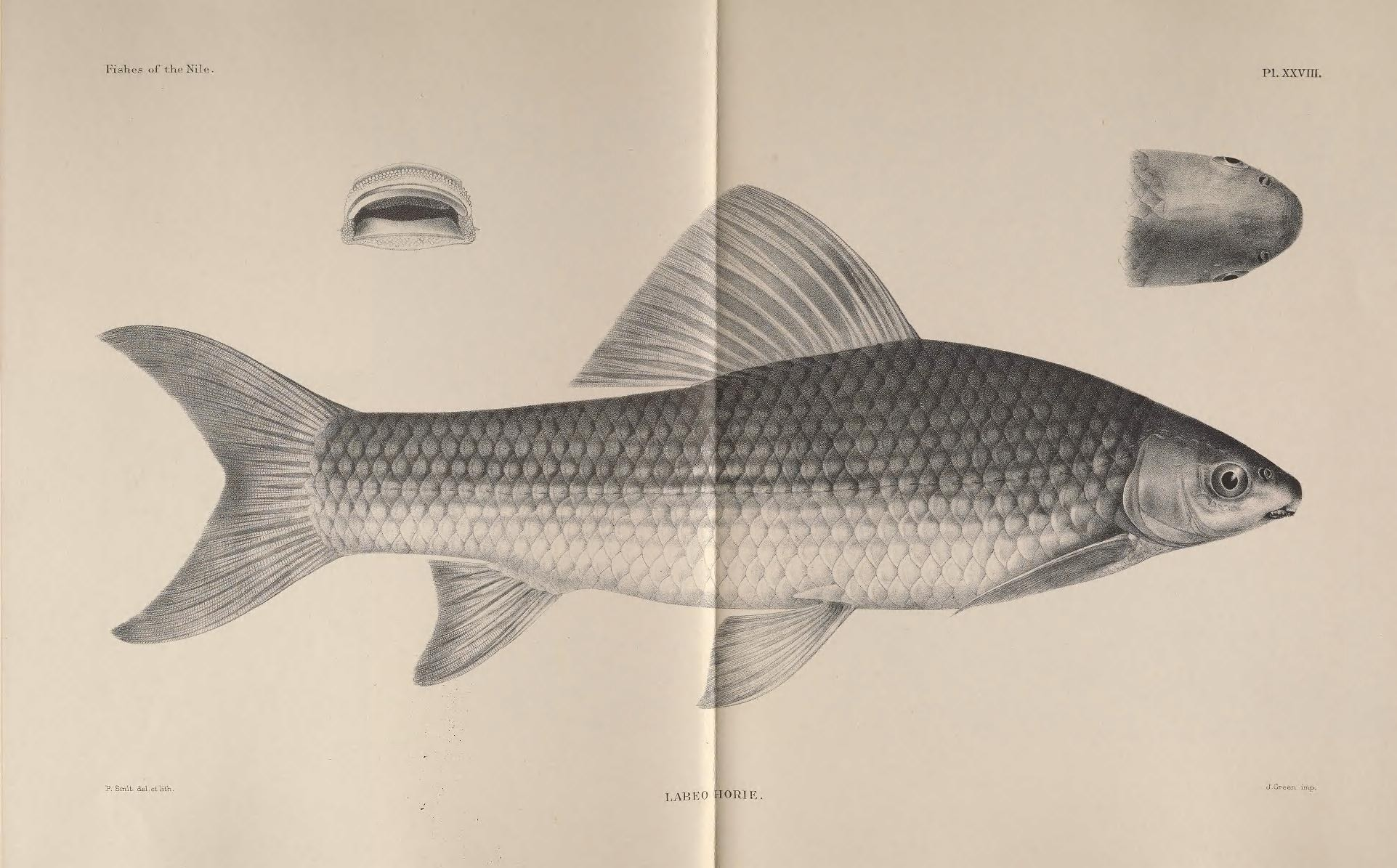

Scientific classification
- Kingdom: Animalia
- Phylum: Chordata
- Class: Actinopterygii
- Division: Teleostei
- Order: Cypriniformes
- Family: Cyprinidae
- Subfamily: Labeoninae
- Genus: Labeo
- Species: L. horie

Binomial name
- Labeo horie Heckel, 1847

= Labeo horie =

Species of fish

Labeo horie, the Assuan labeo, is a fish in the genus Labeo which is found in the Blue Nile and the White Nile, including Lake Albert, Lake Kyoga and Lake Turkana.
