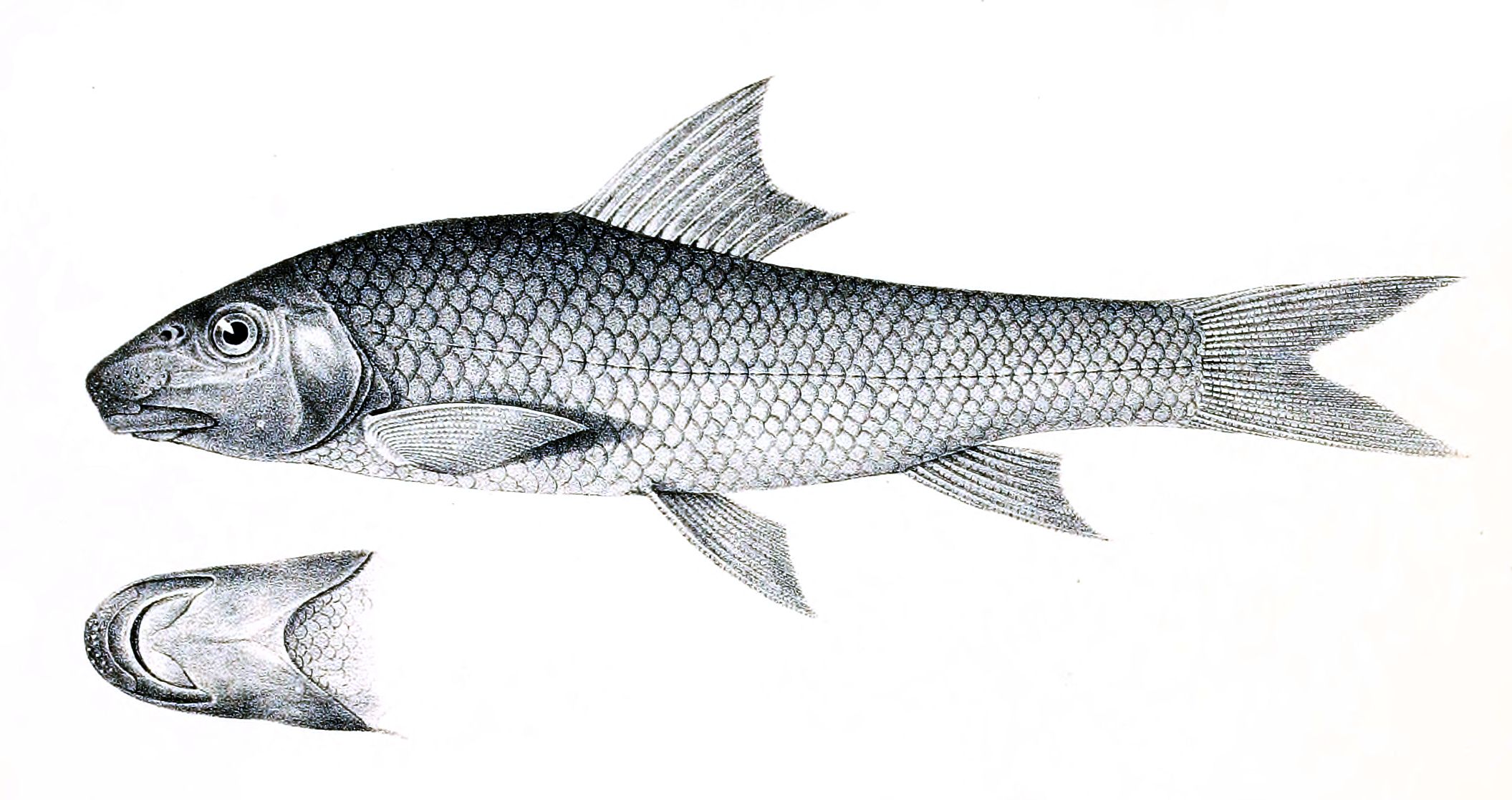

Conservation status
- Near Threatened (IUCN 3.1)

Scientific classification
- Kingdom: Animalia
- Phylum: Chordata
- Class: Actinopterygii
- Order: Cypriniformes
- Family: Cyprinidae
- Genus: Labeo
- Species: L. dyocheilus

Binomial name
- Labeo dyocheilus McClelland, 1839

Synonyms
- Cyprinus dyocheilus McClelland, 1839; Gobio bicolor McClelland, 1839; Labeo tezpurensis Chaudhuri, 1912; Osteochilus sondhii Hora & Mukerji, 1934

= Labeo dyocheilus =

Species of fish

Labeo dyocheilus is a species of fish in the genus Labeo from southern Asia and commonly known as ghora mach in Bengali.
