= Labeo nasus =

Conservation status
- Least Concern (IUCN 3.1)

Scientific classification
- Kingdom: Animalia
- Phylum: Chordata
- Class: Actinopterygii
- Order: Cypriniformes
- Family: Cyprinidae
- Subfamily: Labeoninae
- Genus: Labeo
- Species: L. nasus

Binomial name
- Labeo nasus Boulenger, 1899

Species of fish

Labeo nasus is a species of fish in the genus Labeo from the Congo Basin.
