= Labeo pellegrini =

Scientific classification
- Domain: Eukaryota
- Kingdom: Animalia
- Phylum: Chordata
- Class: Actinopterygii
- Order: Cypriniformes
- Family: Cyprinidae
- Subfamily: Labeoninae
- Genus: Labeo
- Species: L. pellegrini

Binomial name
- Labeo pellegrini Zolezzi, 1939

Species of fish

Labeo pellegrini is a species of fish in the genus Labeo which is endemic to the Juba River in Ethiopia.
