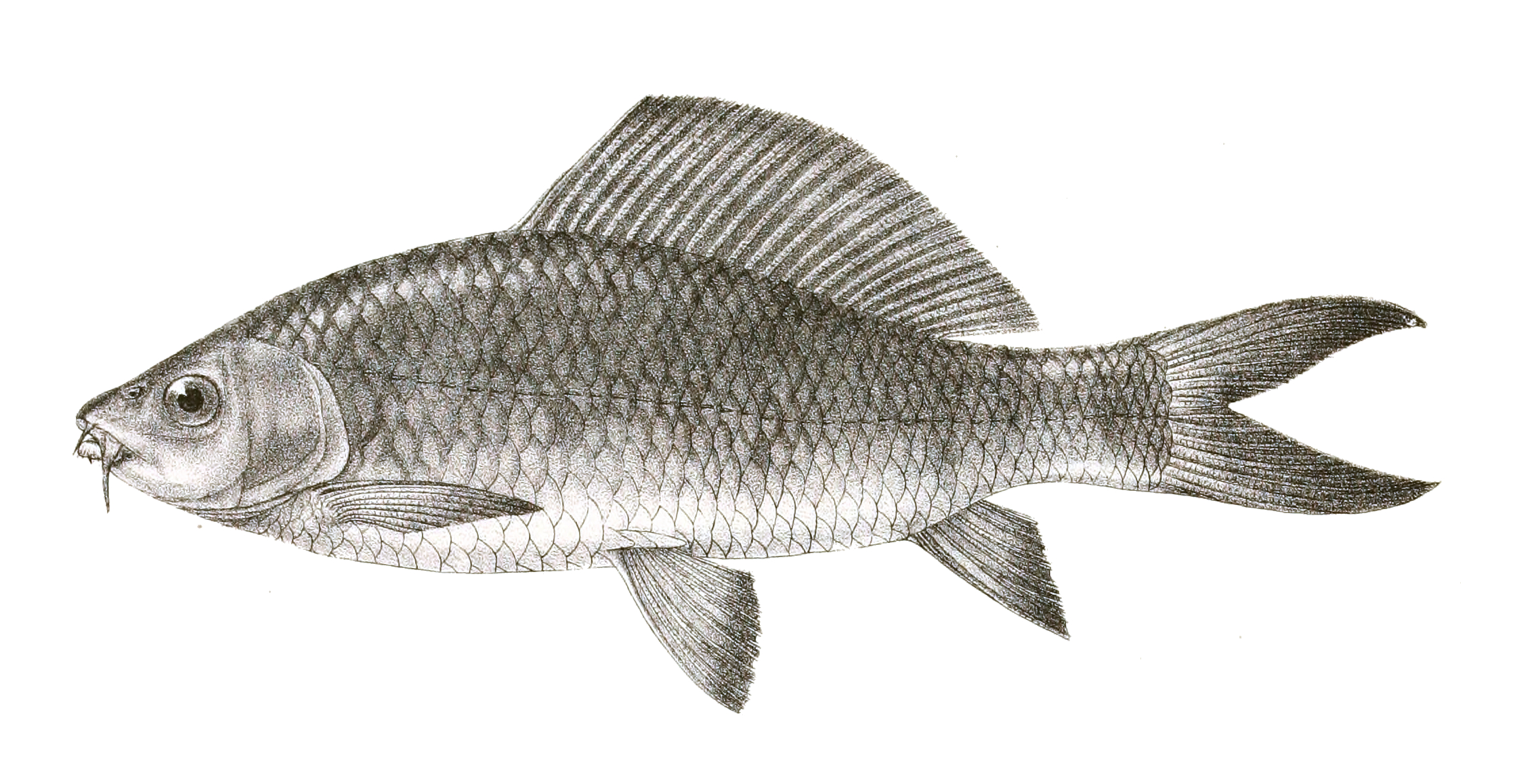
- Labeo nandina

Conservation status
- Near Threatened (IUCN 3.1)

Scientific classification
- Kingdom: Animalia
- Phylum: Chordata
- Class: Actinopterygii
- Order: Cypriniformes
- Family: Cyprinidae
- Subfamily: Labeoninae
- Genus: Labeo
- Species: L. nandina

Binomial name
- Labeo nandina (F. Hamilton, 1822)

Synonyms
- Cyprinus nandina Hamilton, 1822; Rohita nandina (Hamilton, 1822); Cirrhinus macronotus McClelland, 1839

= Labeo nandina =

Species of fish

Labeo nandina is a species of fish in the genus Labeo which is found in north-eastern India, Bangladesh and Myanmar.

This species is critically endangered in Bangladesh due to loss of habitats, claimed the IUCN Bangladesh in 2000.
