= Labeo curchius =

Conservation status
- Data Deficient (IUCN 3.1)

Scientific classification
- Kingdom: Animalia
- Phylum: Chordata
- Class: Actinopterygii
- Order: Cypriniformes
- Family: Cyprinidae
- Subfamily: Labeoninae
- Genus: Labeo
- Species: L. curchius

Binomial name
- Labeo curchius (F. Hamilton, 1822)

Synonyms
- Cyprinus curchius Hamilton, 1822

Species of fish

Labeo curchius is fish in genus Labeo. It is endemic to the Salween basin in Asia, as indicated by Fishbase, but it was originally described from specimens taken from the Ganges and the source used by Fishbase does not state this species is endemic to the Salween but that it is present in that basin. The taxonomic status of L. curchius is uncertain and it may be a domesticated variety of Labeo gonius.
