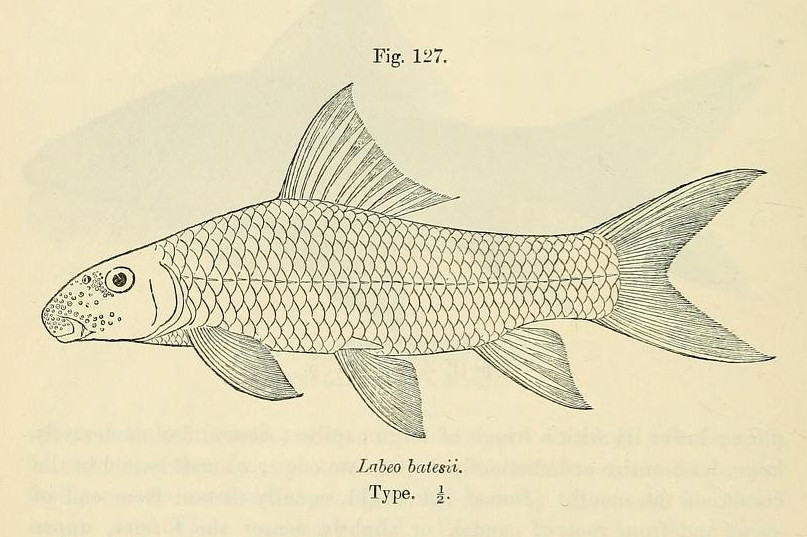

Conservation status
- Least Concern (IUCN 3.1)

Scientific classification
- Kingdom: Animalia
- Phylum: Chordata
- Class: Actinopterygii
- Order: Cypriniformes
- Family: Cyprinidae
- Subfamily: Labeoninae
- Genus: Labeo
- Species: L. batesii

Binomial name
- Labeo batesii Boulenger, 1911

= Labeo batesii =

Species of fish

Labeo batesii is a species of fish in the genus Labeo from the Lower Guinea region of west Africa.
