= Labeo baldasseronii =

Scientific classification
- Domain: Eukaryota
- Kingdom: Animalia
- Phylum: Chordata
- Class: Actinopterygii
- Order: Cypriniformes
- Family: Cyprinidae
- Subfamily: Labeoninae
- Genus: Labeo
- Species: L. baldasseronii

Binomial name
- Labeo baldasseronii di Caporiacco, 1948

Species of fish

Labeo baldasseronii is a species of fish in the family Cyprinidae, the carps and minnows. It is known only from the type locality in Mozambique.
