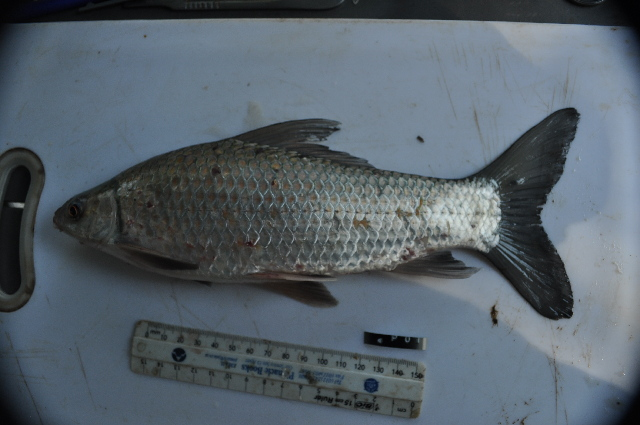

Conservation status
- Least Concern (IUCN 3.1)

Scientific classification
- Kingdom: Animalia
- Phylum: Chordata
- Class: Actinopterygii
- Order: Cypriniformes
- Family: Cyprinidae
- Subfamily: Labeoninae
- Genus: Labeo
- Species: L. rosae

Binomial name
- Labeo rosae Steindachner, 1894

Synonyms
- Labeo transvaalensis Methuen, 1911; Labeo hamiltoni Gilchrist & Thompson, 1917

= Labeo rosae =

Species of fish

Labeo rosae, the rednose labeo, is a species of fish in the genus Labeo which is found in the Limpopo River, Incomati River and Pongola River basins in southern Africa.
