= Labeo pietschmanni =

Scientific classification
- Domain: Eukaryota
- Kingdom: Animalia
- Phylum: Chordata
- Class: Actinopterygii
- Order: Cypriniformes
- Family: Cyprinidae
- Subfamily: Labeoninae
- Genus: Labeo
- Species: L. pietschmanni

Binomial name
- Labeo pietschmanni Machan, 1930

Species of fish

Labeo pietschmanni is a species of fish in the genus Labeo. It is found in Indonesia.
