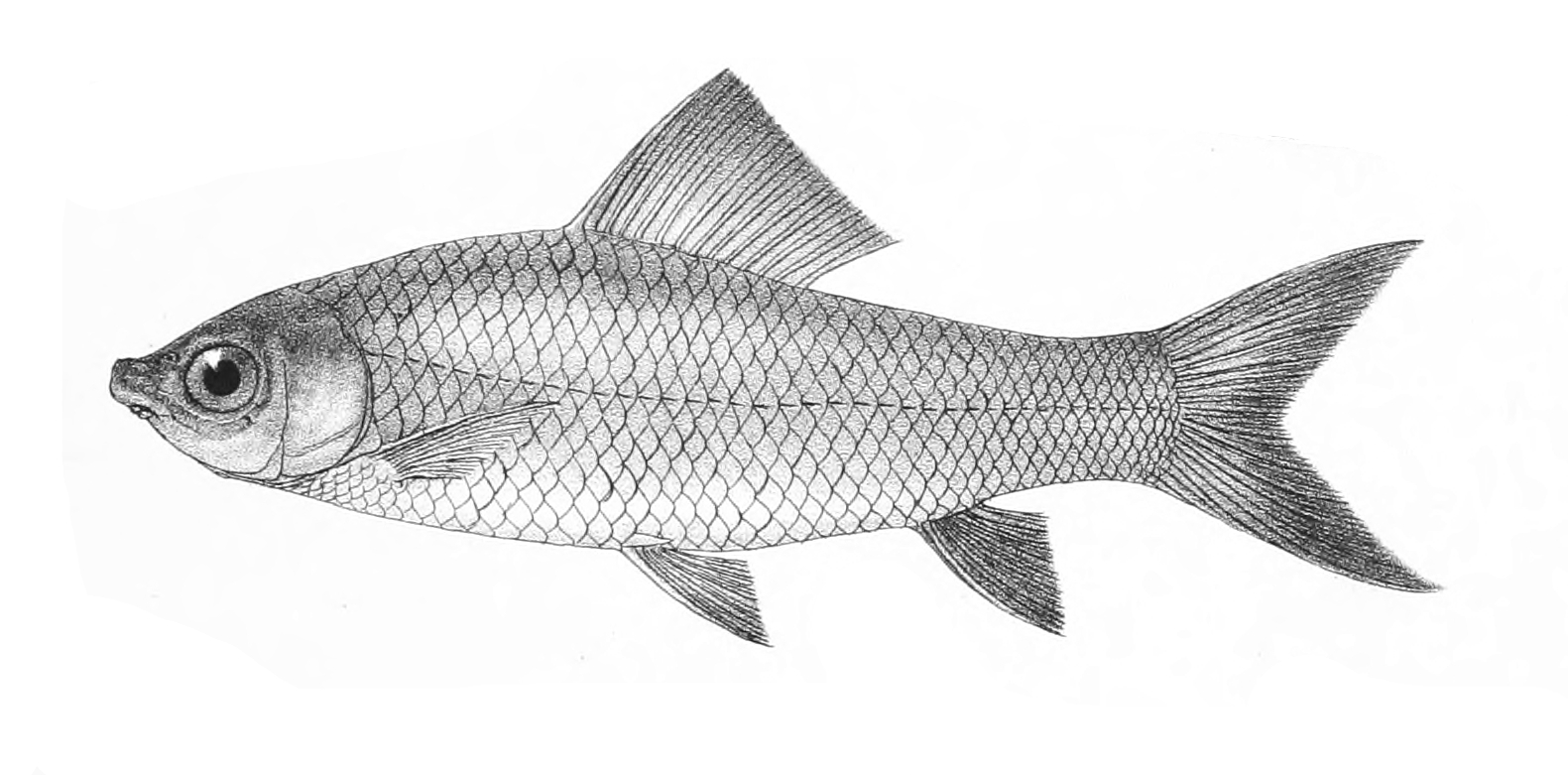

Scientific classification
- Kingdom: Animalia
- Phylum: Chordata
- Class: Actinopterygii
- Order: Cypriniformes
- Family: Cyprinidae
- Subfamily: Labeoninae
- Genus: Labeo
- Species: L. caeruleus

Binomial name
- Labeo caeruleus F. Day, 1877

= Labeo caeruleus =

Species of fish

Labeo caeruleus is fish in genus Labeo from Pakistan.
