= Labeo nunensis =

Conservation status
- Least Concern (IUCN 3.1)

Scientific classification
- Domain: Eukaryota
- Kingdom: Animalia
- Phylum: Chordata
- Class: Actinopterygii
- Order: Cypriniformes
- Family: Cyprinidae
- Subfamily: Labeoninae
- Genus: Labeo
- Species: L. nunensis

Binomial name
- Labeo nunensis Pellegrin, 1929

Species of fish

Labeo nunensis is a species of fish in the genus Labeo from Cameroon.
