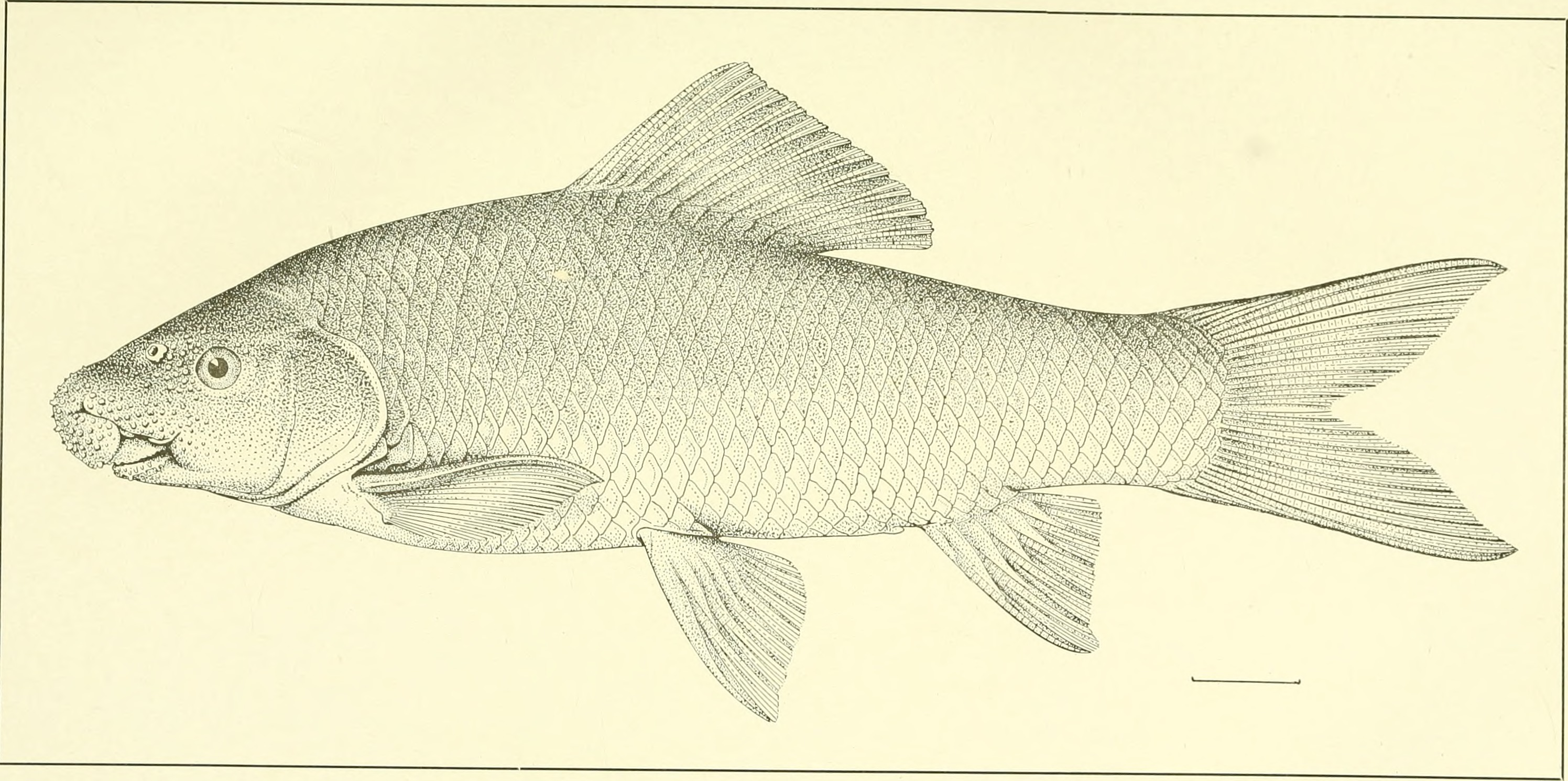

Conservation status
- Endangered (IUCN 3.1)

Scientific classification
- Kingdom: Animalia
- Phylum: Chordata
- Class: Actinopterygii
- Order: Cypriniformes
- Family: Cyprinidae
- Subfamily: Labeoninae
- Genus: Labeo
- Species: L. fisheri

Binomial name
- Labeo fisheri D. S. Jordan & Starks, 1917

Synonyms
- Labeo gadeya Deraniyagala, 1929; Labeo (Morulius) gadeya Deraniyagala, 1929; Labeo lankae (not Deraniyagala, 1952): Anonymous, 2011; De Silva et al. 2015

= Green labeo =

Species of fish

The green labeo or mountain labeo (Labeo fisheri), is a species of freshwater fish in the family Cyprinidae. It is found only in Sri Lanka, where it occurs in streams in the basin of the Mahaweli River.

== Description ==
Green labeo can reach up 36 centimeters (14.2 inches). Adults have an olive green body with whitish belly. Adult fins are much darker than juveniles'. However, juvenile and young adult green labeo have a yellowish-brown body, instead of olive. A black spot may be present near the tail on some adults. The dorsal fin has 10-12 rays.

== Ecology ==
It feeds on algae on the substrate and is a fast swimming species. It is threatened by the damming of streams for hydro-electric and irrigation, as well as deforestation of its habitat, and the resulting siltation and increased stream turbidity. It may already be extinct.

== Habitat ==
Its habitat is clear, rocky, fast flowing mountain streams shaded by trees.
