= Labeo camerunensis =

Conservation status
- Least Concern (IUCN 3.1)

Scientific classification
- Kingdom: Animalia
- Phylum: Chordata
- Class: Actinopterygii
- Order: Cypriniformes
- Family: Cyprinidae
- Genus: Labeo
- Species: L. camerunensis

Binomial name
- Labeo camerunensis Trewavas, 1974

Species of fish

Labeo camerunensis is a species of freshwater fish belonging to the genus Labeo. It is found in the Mungo River in western Cameroon.
