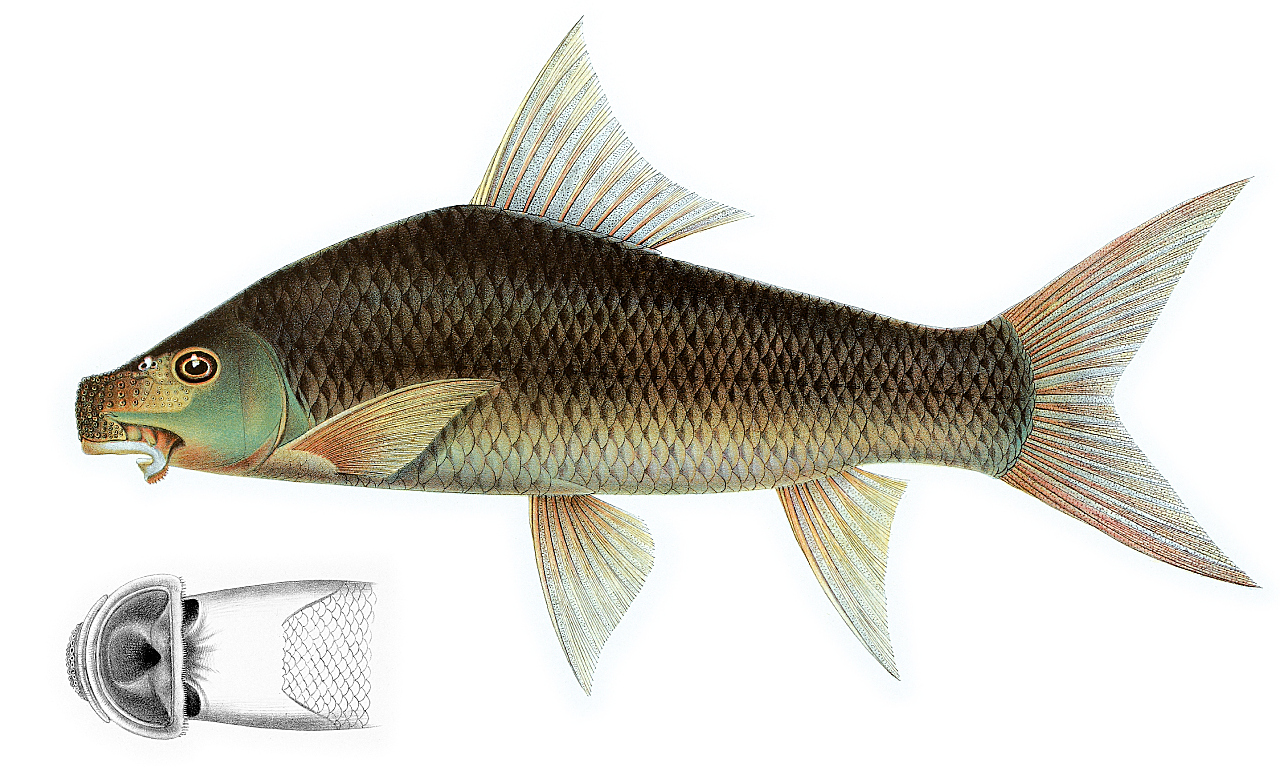

Scientific classification
- Kingdom: Animalia
- Phylum: Chordata
- Class: Actinopterygii
- Order: Cypriniformes
- Family: Cyprinidae
- Subfamily: Labeoninae
- Genus: Labeo
- Species: L. erythropterus

Binomial name
- Labeo erythropterus Valenciennes, 1842

= Labeo erythropterus =

Species of fish

Labeo erythropterus is fish in genus Labeo from the Mekong basin, Java and Sumatra.
