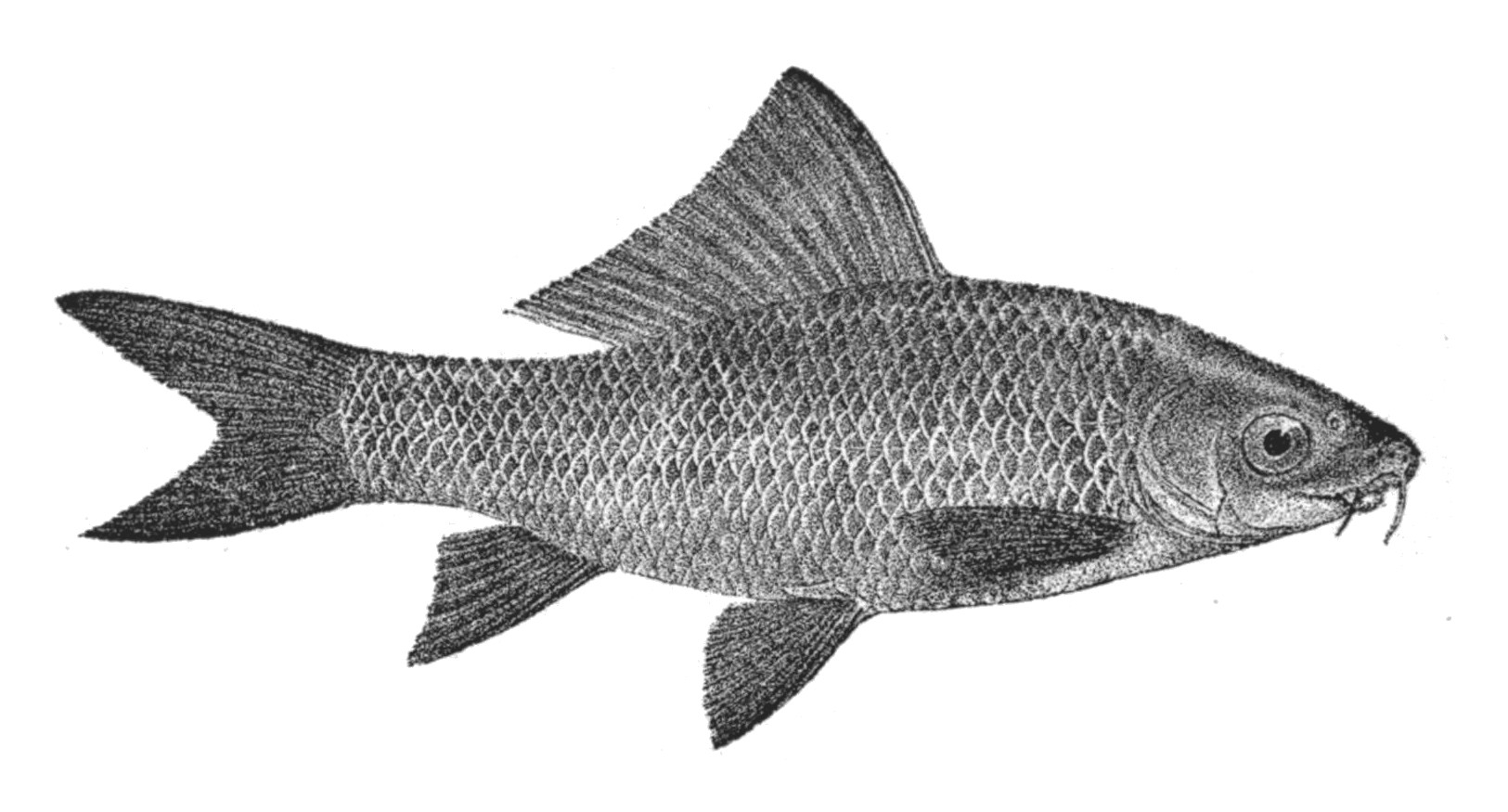
- orangefin labeo (Labeo calbasu)

Scientific classification
- Kingdom: Animalia
- Phylum: Chordata
- Class: Actinopterygii
- Order: Cypriniformes
- Family: Cyprinidae
- Subfamily: Labeoninae
- Genus: Labeo; Cuvier, 1816

Type species
- Cyprinus niloticus Forsskål, 1775

Species
- See text

Synonyms
- Abrostomus Smith, 1841; Chrysophekadion Bleeker, 1860; Morulius Hamilton, 1822; Rohita Valenciennes in Cuvier & Valenciennes, 1842; Rohitichthys Bleeker, 1860

= Labeo =

Genus of fishes

Labeo is a genus of fish in the family Cyprinidae, the family of carps and barbs. They are found in freshwater habitats in the tropics and subtropics of Africa and Asia. It contains the typical labeos in the subfamily Labeoninae (alternatively, the tribe Labeonini or subtribe Labeoina, if subsumed into Cyprininae).

== Description ==
The labeos appear fairly similar to the "freshwater sharks" of the genus Epalzeorhynchos, which is also part of the same clade though not very closely related; labeos are larger, and have a more spindle-shaped body, as they are mostly free-swimming rather than the benthic Epalzeorhynchos. Their mouths are distinct as well; labeos have a pronounced rostral cap, which covers the upper lip except when feeding. The genus name Labeo is Latin for "one who has large lips"; their lips are expanded into thick, sausage-shaped pads which have keratinized edges. Thus, their mouth parts are moderately apomorphic; not as little-developed as in barbs or in Epalzeorhynchos, but neither as extensive as in, for example, Garra or Ptychidio.

Labeos have a pair of barbels on the rostrum or snout and another pair at the rear edges of the lower maxilla, which has been lost in some of their relatives; this feature is common among the Cyprinidae. They have a well-developed vomeropalatine organ. In the Weberian apparatus, the posterior supraneural bone is elongated and contacts the skull at the forward end.

== Taxonomy ==
=== Species ===
These are the currently recognized species in this genus:

- Labeo alluaudi Pellegrin, 1933
- Labeo alticentralis Tshibwabwa, 1997
- Labeo altivelis W. K. H. Peters, 1852 (Rednose labeo)
- Labeo angra (Hamilton, 1822)
- Labeo annectens Boulenger, 1903
- Labeo ansorgii Boulenger, 1907 (Cunene labeo)
- Labeo baldasseronii di Caporiacco, 1948
- Labeo barbatus Boulenger, 1898
- Labeo bata (Hamilton, 1822) (bata)
- Labeo boga (Hamilton, 1822) (Species inquirenda)
- Labeo boggut (Sykes, 1839) (boggut labeo)
- Labeo bottegi Vinciguerra, 1897 (Species inquirenda)
- Labeo boulengeri Vinciguerra, 1912
- Labeo brachypoma Günther, 1868 (Species inquirenda)
- Labeo caeruleus F. Day, 1877
- Labeo calbasu (Hamilton, 1822) (orangefin labeo)
- Labeo camerunensis Trewavas, 1974
- Labeo capensis (A. Smith, 1841) (Orange River mudfish)
- Labeo catla (Hamilton 1822) (catla)
- Labeo chariensis Pellegrin, 1904
- Labeo chekida Kumar, Ravi & Basheer, 2025
- Labeo chrysophekadion (Bleeker, 1850) (black sharkminnow)
- Labeo congoro Peters, 1852 (Purple labeo)
- Labeo coubie Rüppell, 1832 (African carp)
- Labeo curchius (Hamilton, 1822)
- Labeo curriei Fowler, 1919
- Labeo cyclopinnis Nichols & Griscom, 1917
- Labeo cyclorhynchus Boulenger, 1899 (Harlequin sharkminnow)
- Labeo cylindricus Peters, 1852 (Redeye labeo) (Species inquirenda)
- Labeo degeni Boulenger, 1920
- Labeo dhonti Boulenger, 1920
- Labeo djourae Blache & Miton 1960
- Labeo dussumieri (Valenciennes, 1842)
- Labeo dyocheilus (McClelland, 1839)
- Labeo erythropterus Valenciennes, 1842
- Labeo falcipinnis Boulenger, 1903
- Labeo filiferus Plamoottil & Zupančič, 2017
- Labeo fimbriatus (Bloch, 1795) (Fringed-lipped peninsula carp)
- Labeo fisheri D. S. Jordan & Starks, 1917 (green labeo, mountain labeo)
- Labeo forskalii Rüppell, 1835
- Labeo fuelleborni Hilgendorf & Pappenheim, 1903 (Fuelleborn's labeo)
- Labeo fulakariensis Tshibwabwa, Stiassny & Schelly, 2006
- Labeo gonius (Hamilton, 1822) (Kuria labeo, gnhora)
- Labeo greenii Boulenger, 1902
- Labeo gregorii Günther, 1894 (Gregori's labeo)
- Labeo heladiva Sudasinghe, Ranasinghe, Goonatilake & Meegaskumbura, 2018
- Labeo horie Heckel, 1847
- Labeo indramontri H. M. Smith 1945
- Labeo inornatus (Roberts, 1997)
- Labeo kaage Kumar, Ravi, Krishnaprasoon & Basheer, 2026
- Labeo kawrus (Sykes, 1839)
- Labeo kibimbi Poll 1949
- Labeo kirkii Boulenger, 1903
- Labeo kontius (Jerdon, 1849) (Pigmouth carp)
- Labeo lankae Deraniyagala, 1952
- Labeo latebra Moritz & Neumann, 2017
- Labeo lineatus Boulenger, 1898
- Labeo lividus Roberts & Stewart, 1976
- Labeo longipinnis Boulenger, 1898
- Labeo lualabaensis Tshibwabwa, 1997
- Labeo lugubris Nichols & LaMonte, 1933 (Species inquirenda)
- Labeo lukulae Boulenger, 1902.
- Labeo luluae Fowler, 1930
- Labeo lunatus Jubb, 1963
- Labeo macrostoma Boulenger, 1898
- Labeo manasseeae Liyandja & Stiassny, 2023
- Labeo mbimbii Liyandja & Stiassny, 2023
- Labeo meroensis Moritz, 2007
- Labeo mesops Günther, 1868 (Tana labeo)
- Labeo microphthalmus Day, 1877
- Labeo mokotoensis Poll, 1939
- Labeo molybdinus du Plessis, 1963 (Leaden labeo)
- Labeo nandina (Hamilton, 1822)
- Labeo nasus Boulenger, 1899
- Labeo ngqikai Ramoejane, 2026
- Labeo nigrescens Day, 1870
- Labeo nigricans Boulenger, 1911
- Labeo nigripinnis Day, 1877
- Labeo niloticus (Linnaeus, 1758) (Nile carp)
- Labeo nunensis Pellegrin, 1929
- Labeo obscurus Pellegrin, 1908
- Labeo ogunensis Boulenger, 1910
- Labeo pangusia (Hamilton, 1822)
- Labeo parvus Boulenger, 1902
- Labeo pellegrini Zolezzi, 1939
- Labeo percivali Boulenger, 1912 (Ewaso Nyiro labeo)
- Labeo pierrei (Sauvage, 1880)
- Labeo pietschmanni Machan, 1930
- Labeo polli Tshibwabwa, 1997
- Labeo porcellus (Heckel, 1844) (Bombay labeo)
- Labeo potail (Sykes, 1839)
- Labeo quadribarbis Poll & J. P. Gosse, 1963
- Labeo rajasthanicus A. K. Datta & Majumdar, 1970
- Labeo rectipinnis Tshibwabwa, 1997
- Labeo reidi Tshibwabwa, 1997
- Labeo ricnorhynchus (McClelland, 1839)
- Labeo rohita Hamilton, 1822 (rohu, roho labeo)
- Labeo rosae Steindachner, 1894
- Labeo roseopunctatus Paugy, Guégan & Agnèse, 1990
- Labeo rouaneti Daget, 1962
- Labeo rubirostris (Roberts, 1997)
- Labeo rubromaculatus Gilchrist & W. W. Thompson, 1913 (Tugela labeo)
- Labeo ruddi Boulenger, 1907 (silver labeo)
- Labeo sanagaensis Tshibwabwa, 1997
- Labeo seeberi Gilchrist & W. W. Thompson, 1911 (Clanwilliam sandfish)
- Labeo senegalensis Valenciennes, 1842
- Labeo shivamogaensis Arunachalam, Anusha & Sivakumar, 2018
- Labeo simpsoni Ricardo-Bertram, 1943
- Labeo sorex Nichols & Griscom, 1917
- Labeo stolizkae Steindachner, 1870
- Labeo tincoides (Valenciennes, 1842) (Species inquirenda)
- Labeo trigliceps Pellegrin, 1927
- Labeo umbratus (A. Smith, 1841) (Moggel)
- Labeo uru Kumar, Ravi & Basheer, 2025
- Labeo victorianus Boulenger, 1901 (ningu)
- Labeo vulgaris Heckel, 1847
- Labeo werneri Lohberger, 1929
- Labeo worthingtoni Fowler, 1958

=== Phylogeny ===
The type species of Labeo, Labeo niloticus (=Labeo vulgaris), were grouped together with L. horie, L. senegalensis, L. weeksii, L. mesops, L. lineatus, L. rosae, L. altivelis, and L. ruddi, but more recently was found to clade with L. ruddi, L. capensis, L. umbratus, and a number of undescribed species.

The following maximum likelihood phylogenetic tree is based on a dataset of nuclear and mitochondrial DNA, from Yang et al. 2012, with updated binomial names:

- Labeoina
  - Gymnostomus ariza
  - - - Incisilabeo behri
      - Bangana sensu stricto
    - - Cirrhinus cirrhosus
      - - Cirrhinus microlepis
        - ⊞Labeo sensu stricto
          ⊟
          - - - Labeo angra
              - Labeo sp. Salween
            - - - Labeo calbasu
                - Labeo chrysophekadion
              - - - Labeo dussumieri
                  - - Labeo rajasthanicus
                    - Labeo gonius
                - - Labeo fimbriatus
                  - - - Labeo rohita
                      - Labeo stolizkae
                    - Labeo catla
          - - - Labeo dyocheilus
              - - Labeo pierrei
                - Labeo yunnanensis
            - - - Labeo batesii
                - - - Labeo cyclorhynchus
                    - - Labeo coubie
                      - Labeo longipinnis
                  - - Labeo cf. barbatus
                    - - Labeo lineatus
                      - - - - Labeo senegalensis
                            - Labeo horie
                          - - Labeo weeksii
                            - Labeo altivelis
              - - Labeo vulgaris
                - - Labeo lukulae
                  - - Labeo sorex
                    - - Labeo forskalii
                      - Labeo parvus

"Labeoina" is the most basal clade within Labeonini sensu Yang et al. 2012 (=Labeoninae sensu ECoF/WoRMS).
