= Labeo meroensis =

Scientific classification
- Domain: Eukaryota
- Kingdom: Animalia
- Phylum: Chordata
- Class: Actinopterygii
- Order: Cypriniformes
- Family: Cyprinidae
- Subfamily: Labeoninae
- Genus: Labeo
- Species: L. meroensis

Binomial name
- Labeo meroensis Moritz, 2007

Species of fish

Labeo meroensis is fish in genus Labeo from the Nile River in Sudan.
