= Labeo mokotoensis =

Scientific classification
- Kingdom: Animalia
- Phylum: Chordata
- Class: Actinopterygii
- Order: Cypriniformes
- Family: Cyprinidae
- Subfamily: Labeoninae
- Genus: Labeo
- Species: L. mokotoensis

Binomial name
- Labeo mokotoensis Poll, 1939

Species of fish

Labeo mokotoensis is one of 103 fish species in the genus Labeo. It has only ever been recorded in Lake Ndaraga in the Congo Basin of the Democratic Republic of the Congo.
