= Labeo ricnorhynchus =

Scientific classification
- Kingdom: Animalia
- Phylum: Chordata
- Class: Actinopterygii
- Order: Cypriniformes
- Family: Cyprinidae
- Genus: Labeo
- Species: L. ricnorhynchus

Binomial name
- Labeo ricnorhynchus (McClelland, 1839)

Synonyms
- Gobio ricnorhynchus

Species of fish

Labeo ricnorhynchus is a species of freshwater fish belonging to the genus Labeo. It is endemic to India and is typically found in river systems and freshwater habitats across the country. Like other species in the genus, it plays a role in maintaining the ecological balance of its habitat by contributing to the detritus food chain, as it often feeds on algae and organic matter. Its presence indicates a healthy freshwater ecosystem, and it is of interest to researchers studying biodiversity and conservation in Indian river systems.
