= Labeo falcipinnis =

Conservation status
- Least Concern (IUCN 3.1)

Scientific classification
- Kingdom: Animalia
- Phylum: Chordata
- Class: Actinopterygii
- Order: Cypriniformes
- Family: Cyprinidae
- Subfamily: Labeoninae
- Genus: Labeo
- Species: L. falcipinnis

Binomial name
- Labeo falcipinnis Boulenger, 1903

Species of fish

Labeo falcipinnis is fish in genus Labeo from the Congo River.
