= Labeo vulgaris =

Scientific classification
- Kingdom: Animalia
- Phylum: Chordata
- Class: Actinopterygii
- Division: Teleostei
- Order: Cypriniformes
- Family: Cyprinidae
- Genus: Labeo
- Species: L. vulgaris

Binomial name
- Labeo vulgaris Heckel, 1847

Species of fish

Labeo vulgaris is a species of freshwater fish belonging to the genus Labeo. It is endemic to Egypt. It is sometimes considered conspecific with Labeo niloticus.
