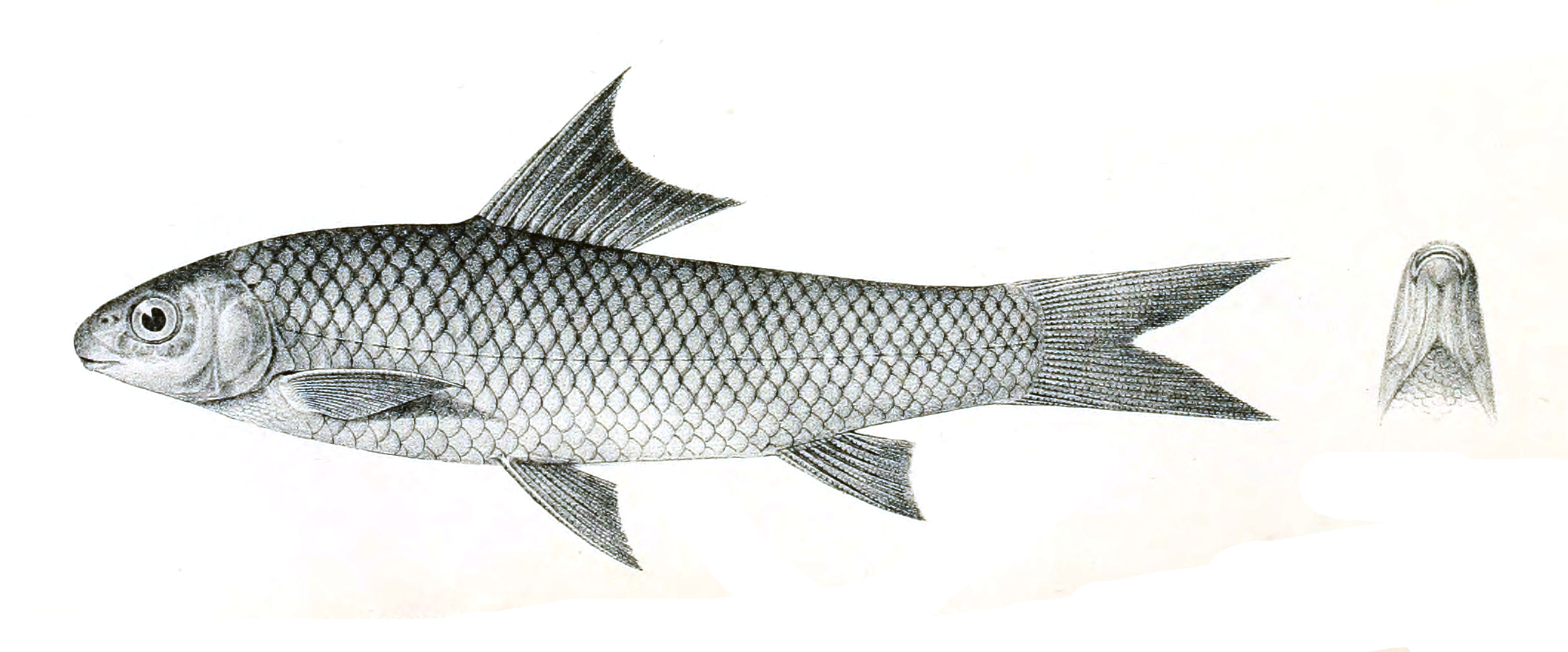

Conservation status
- Endangered (IUCN 3.1)

Scientific classification
- Domain: Eukaryota
- Kingdom: Animalia
- Phylum: Chordata
- Class: Actinopterygii
- Order: Cypriniformes
- Family: Cyprinidae
- Subfamily: Labeoninae
- Genus: Labeo
- Species: L. kawrus

Binomial name
- Labeo kawrus Sykes, 1839

Synonyms
- Chondrostoma kawrus Sykes, 1839

= Labeo kawrus =

Species of fish

Labeo kawrus, the Deccan labeo, is fish in genus Labeo. It can only be found in the Krishna River system of the northern Western Ghats in the Indian states of Karnataka and Maharashtra. It occurs in the upper reaches of rivers, in lakes and reservoirs. It can grow to 60 cm in total length. Spawning begins with the onset of south-west monsoon. The habitat of this species is severely threatened by organic and inorganic pollution, and possibly overexploitation. There is evidence indicating declines in populations in the northern part of the species' range.
