= Ningu =

Conservation status
- Critically Endangered (IUCN 3.1)

Scientific classification
- Kingdom: Animalia
- Phylum: Chordata
- Class: Actinopterygii
- Order: Cypriniformes
- Family: Cyprinidae
- Subfamily: Labeoninae
- Genus: Labeo
- Species: L. victorianus

Binomial name
- Labeo victorianus Boulenger, 1901

Species of fish

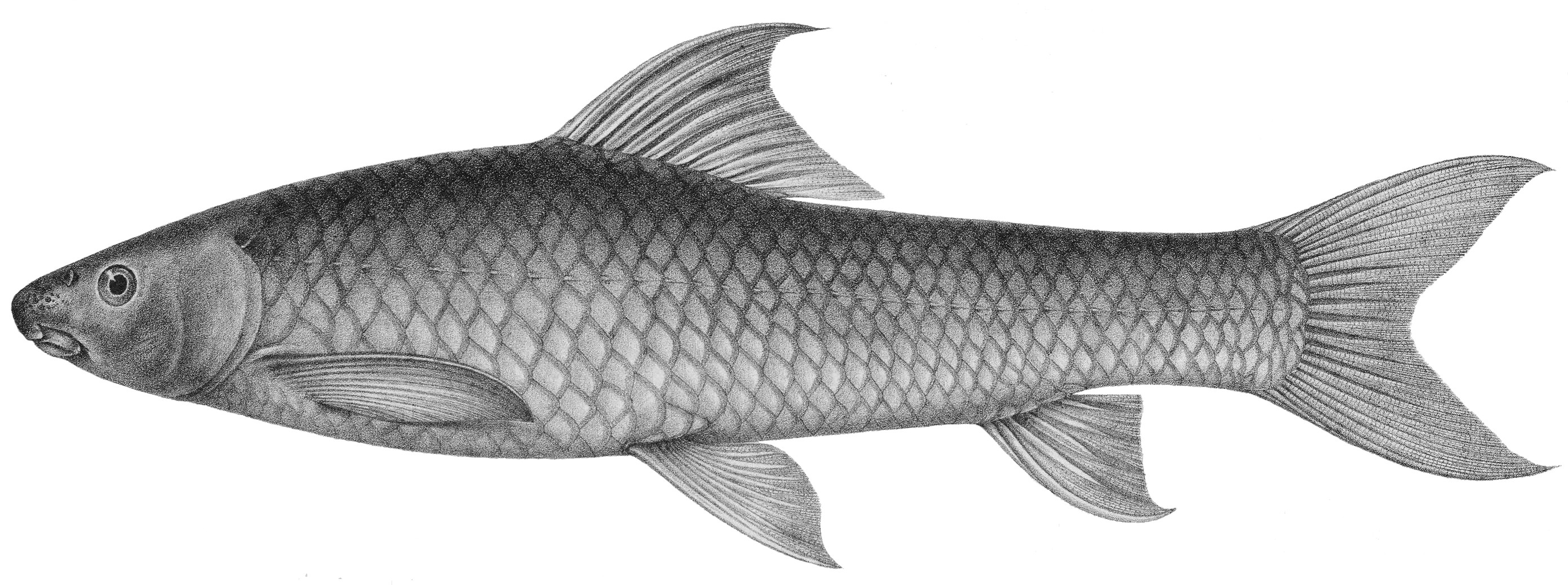
A drawing of a ningu

The ningu (Labeo victorianus) is a species of ray-finned fish in the family Cyprinidae. It is found in the Lake Victoria basin in Burundi, Kenya, Tanzania, and Uganda. Its natural habitats are rivers, swamps, freshwater lakes, freshwater marshes, and inland deltas. It is threatened by a loss of habitat due to pollution, siltation and drainage as agriculture expands in the Lake Victoria basin, by overfishing on their breeding migrations and by introduced alien fish.
