= Labeo alluaudi =

Conservation status
- Least Concern (IUCN 3.1)

Scientific classification
- Kingdom: Animalia
- Phylum: Chordata
- Class: Actinopterygii
- Order: Cypriniformes
- Family: Cyprinidae
- Subfamily: Labeoninae
- Genus: Labeo
- Species: L. alluaudi

Binomial name
- Labeo alluaudi Pellegrin, 1933

Species of fish

Labeo alluaudi is a species of fish in the family Cyprinidae, the carps and minnows. It is native to the Cavally and Nipoué Rivers in Côte d'Ivoire and Liberia. It has also been reported from the Sewa River in Sierra Leone and the Via River in Liberia.

This fish has an elongated body shape and reaches a maximum length of 13.5 to 16.5 centimeters.

It is an endangered species known from a few African rivers, where it is threatened by overfishing, agriculture, mining, deforestation, pollution, and development.
