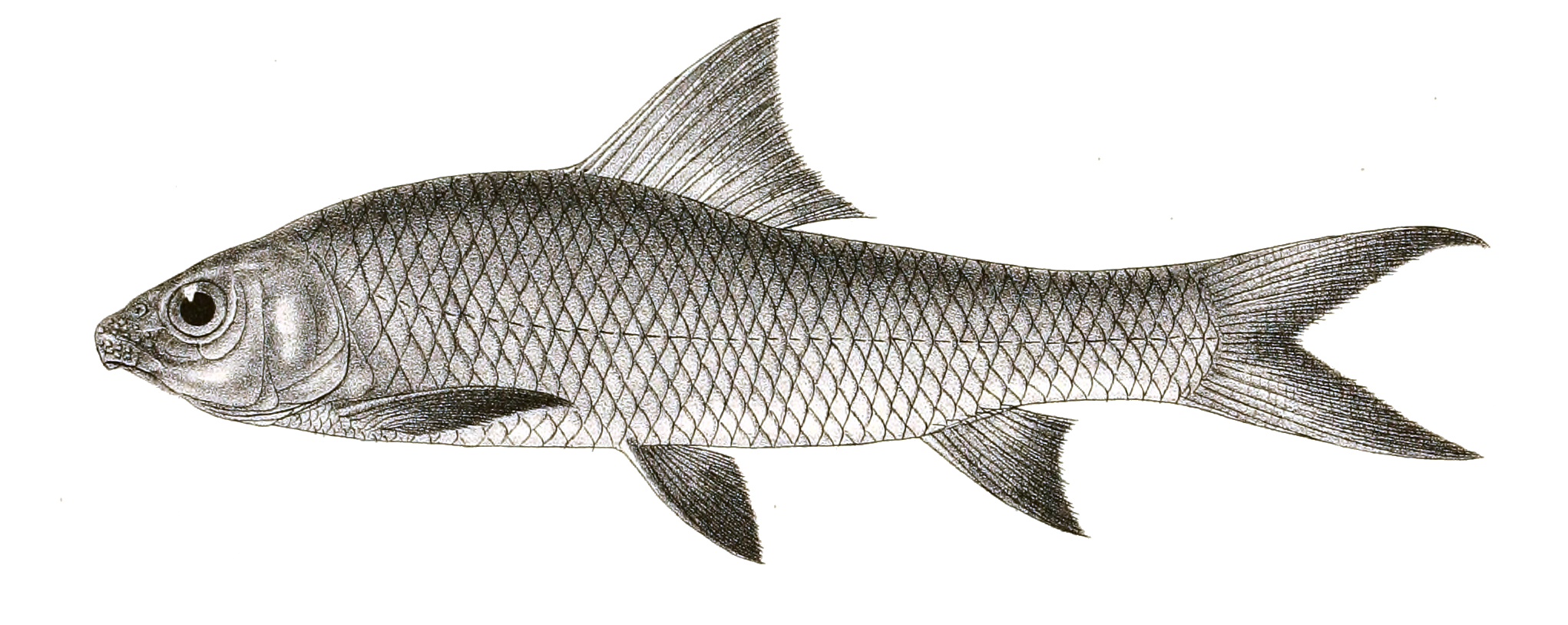

Conservation status
- Least Concern (IUCN 3.1)

Scientific classification
- Kingdom: Animalia
- Phylum: Chordata
- Class: Actinopterygii
- Order: Cypriniformes
- Family: Cyprinidae
- Subfamily: Labeoninae
- Genus: Labeo
- Species: L. nigripinnis

Binomial name
- Labeo nigripinnis F. Day, 1877

= Labeo nigripinnis =

Species of fish

Labeo nigripinnis is a species of fish in the genus Labeo. It inhabits freshwater rivers in subtropical locations of Pakistan.
