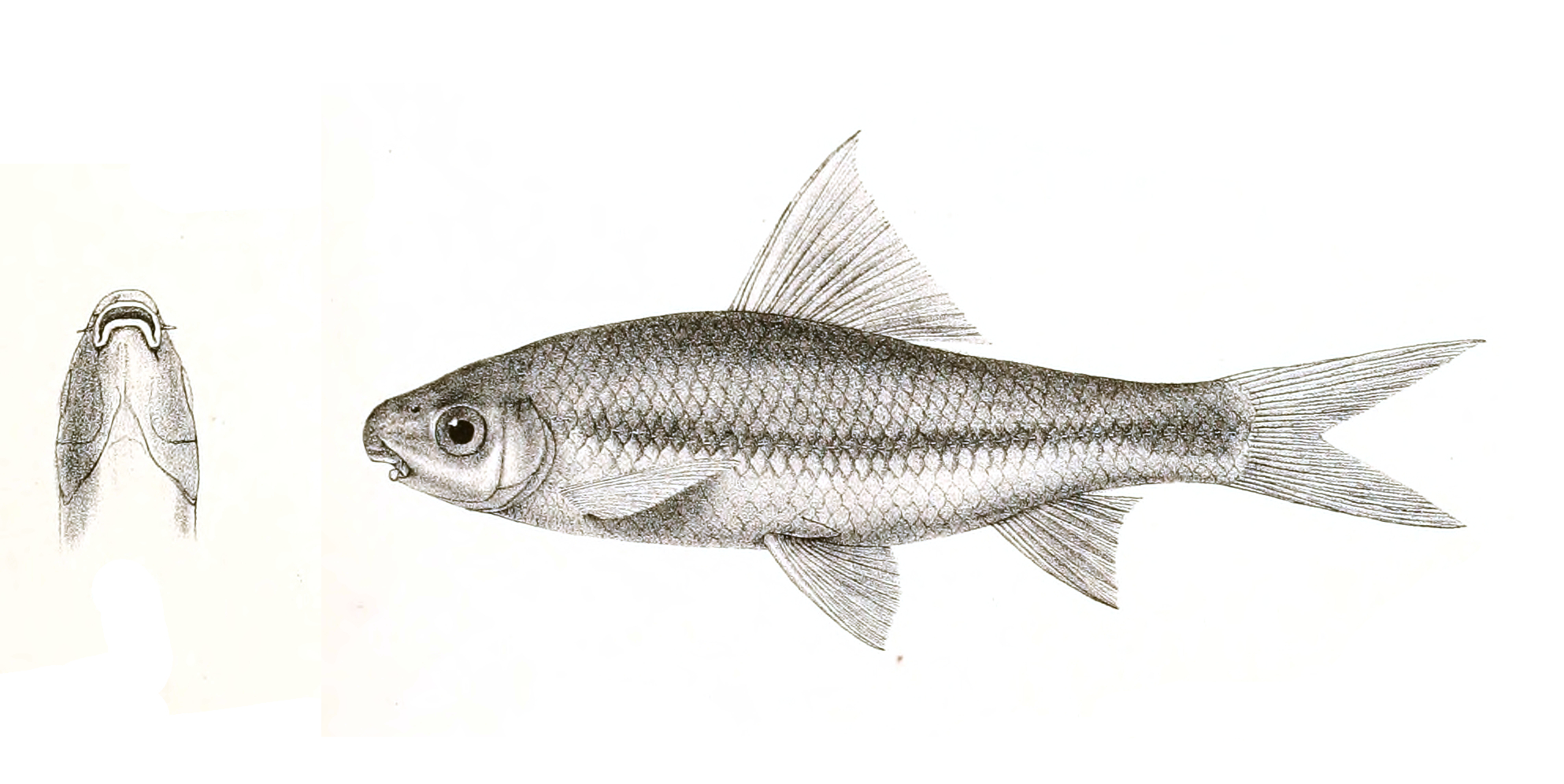

Conservation status
- Least Concern (IUCN 3.1)

Scientific classification
- Kingdom: Animalia
- Phylum: Chordata
- Class: Actinopterygii
- Order: Cypriniformes
- Family: Cyprinidae
- Subfamily: Labeoninae
- Genus: Labeo
- Species: L. angra

Binomial name
- Labeo angra (Hamilton, 1822)

Synonyms
- Cyprinus angra Hamilton, 1822; Gobio angra (Hamilton, 1822); Cyprinus morala Hamilton, 1822; Labeo morala (Hamilton, 1822); Cyprinus hamiltonii Gray, 1830

= Labeo angra =

Species of fish

Labeo angra is a species of fish in the family Cyprinidae, the carps and minnows. It is commonly known as the Angra labeo. It is native to Asia, where it is distributed in Bangladesh, Burma, Nepal, and Pakistan. It has also been reported from Afghanistan.

This fish has been known to reach a maximum length of around 22 centimeters. It is an herbivorous freshwater fish that can be found in several habitat types, such as rivers, lakes, and ponds.

This species is of commercial importance as a food and sport fish. It has become very rare in the Hakaluki Haor wetlands of eastern Bangladesh, and the construction of a dam on the Tinau River of Nepal has interrupted its migration activity there, but in general it is common and not considered threatened.
