= Labeo werneri =

Conservation status
- Data Deficient (IUCN 3.1)

Scientific classification
- Domain: Eukaryota
- Kingdom: Animalia
- Phylum: Chordata
- Class: Actinopterygii
- Order: Cypriniformes
- Family: Cyprinidae
- Subfamily: Labeoninae
- Genus: Labeo
- Species: L. werneri

Binomial name
- Labeo werneri Lohberger, 1929

Species of fish

Labeo werneri is a species of freshwater ray-finned fish in genus Labeo which has only been recorded from Lake Victoria. However, the type specimen has been lost and the only other specimen was a misidentification so the taxonomic validity of this species is in doubt.
