= Harlequin sharkminnow =

Conservation status
- Least Concern (IUCN 3.1)

Scientific classification
- Kingdom: Animalia
- Phylum: Chordata
- Class: Actinopterygii
- Division: Teleostei
- Order: Cypriniformes
- Family: Cyprinidae
- Subfamily: Labeoninae
- Genus: Labeo
- Species: L. cyclorhynchus

Binomial name
- Labeo cyclorhynchus Boulenger, 1899

Synonyms
- Labeo variegatus Pellegrin, 1901

Species of fish

The harlequin sharkminnow (Labeo cyclorhynchus) is a freshwater cyprinid fish from central Africa. It is also known as the harlequin shark and variegated shark, especially in the aquarium hobby.

== Description ==
The harlequin sharkminnow has a creamy yellow ground colour marked with grey, black mottling with translucent fins which are mottle black. They take their vernacular name from the vague resemblance these and similar freshwater species bear to true sharks, in that they have an elongated body with stiff fins. The colour and markings of the fish are most intense in the juveniles, but the colours fade as the fish mature. There is little sexual dimorphism, but the females are much thicker bodied than the males, especially when in spawning condition. The dorsal fin has 12 soft rays and has a deeply curved upper edge, and it has 31 - 32 vertebrae. The lips have rows of transverse ridges of tissue and they possess two pairs of well-developed barbels. They grow to 15 cm.

== Distribution ==
The harlequin sharkminnow is widespread in the lower and middle Congo River basin, including the Ubangui River, in the Central African Republic, Congo and the Democratic Republic of the Congo and Ogowe River in Gabon.

== Biology ==
The harlequin sharkminnow is a benthopelagic species, and they are highly adaptable feeders with an omnivorous diet and their main food source is aufwuchs, including micofauna and algae, which they graze from the bottom . In some areas these fish form an association with groups of common hippopotamus (Hippopotamus amphibius) and the fish browse on the mammals' skin. The adult fish are solitary and highly territorial, except during the spawning season. The juveniles are less aggressive and prefer to hide. Their preferred habitat is clear water rain forest streams with thick marginal and dense submerged vegetation where the water is often stained with tannin from leaves, downed tree branches, and other decomposing organic matter which has fallen into the stream.

== Human utilisation ==
The harlequin sharkminnow is harvested as a food fish. It is also collected for the aquarium trade but because of its aggressive and solitary nature it has not been bred in the aquarium and only wild caught specimens are available.
