= Labeo lukulae =

Red-spot mudsucker

Conservation status
- Least Concern (IUCN 3.1)

Scientific classification
- Kingdom: Animalia
- Phylum: Chordata
- Class: Actinopterygii
- Order: Cypriniformes
- Family: Cyprinidae
- Subfamily: Labeoninae
- Genus: Labeo
- Species: L. lukulae

Binomial name
- Labeo lukulae Boulenger, 1902

Species of fish

Labeo lukulae, the red-spot mudsucker, is a species of freshwater cyprinid fish in the genus Labeo. It is found in western Africa from Cameroon south to Angola. It is exploited for human consumption.
