= Labeo lankae =

Conservation status
- Endangered (IUCN 3.1)

Scientific classification
- Kingdom: Animalia
- Phylum: Chordata
- Class: Actinopterygii
- Order: Cypriniformes
- Family: Cyprinidae
- Genus: Labeo
- Species: L. lankae

Binomial name
- Labeo lankae Deraniyagala, 1952

Synonyms
- Labeo porcellus lankae Deraniyagala, 1930; Labeo porcellus (not Heckel, 1844): Day, 1889

Species of fish

Labeo lankae or Sri Lanka Orange-Fin Labeo is a species of cyprinid fish. It is endemic to Sri Lanka. This species is found in the Mahaweli and Amban Rivers in Sri Lanka.

== Description ==
Rostral fold developed and overlapping upper lip. Maxillary barbels present, whereas rostral barbels are rudimentary or absent. There are 10–12 branched rays on dorsal fin. There are 36–39 scales on lateral line. A hazy black stripe which is originating behind the operculum and extending to caudal peduncle. All fins with reddish suffusion. Body rosy grey dorsally with metallic green margins. A blotch on caudal peduncle. This blotch disappears when the fish is stressed. Sclera of eye is red in color.

== Habitat ==
It is found in moderate flowing streams with a substrate of large rocks and boulders closer to dense riparian vegetation.
