= Labeo rajasthanicus =

Scientific classification
- Domain: Eukaryota
- Kingdom: Animalia
- Phylum: Chordata
- Class: Actinopterygii
- Order: Cypriniformes
- Family: Cyprinidae
- Subfamily: Labeoninae
- Genus: Labeo
- Species: L. rajasthanicus

Binomial name
- Labeo rajasthanicus A. K. Datta & Majumdar, 1970

Species of fish

Labeo rajasthanicus is a species of fish in the genus Labeo.

It is known only from Lake Jasiamand in Rajasthan, India.
