= Labeo nigricans =

Conservation status
- Data Deficient (IUCN 3.1)

Scientific classification
- Kingdom: Animalia
- Phylum: Chordata
- Class: Actinopterygii
- Order: Cypriniformes
- Family: Cyprinidae
- Subfamily: Labeoninae
- Genus: Labeo
- Species: L. nigricans

Binomial name
- Labeo nigricans Boulenger, 1911

Species of fish

Labeo nigricans is a species of fish in the genus Labeo from the Congo Basin.
