= Labeo lualabaensis =

Conservation status
- Least Concern (IUCN 3.1)

Scientific classification
- Kingdom: Animalia
- Phylum: Chordata
- Class: Actinopterygii
- Order: Cypriniformes
- Family: Cyprinidae
- Subfamily: Labeoninae
- Genus: Labeo
- Species: L. lualabaensis

Binomial name
- Labeo lualabaensis Tshibwabwa, 1997

Species of fish

Labeo lualabaensis is fish in genus Labeo from the Congo Basin.
