= Labeo roseopunctatus =

Conservation status
- Least Concern (IUCN 3.1)

Scientific classification
- Kingdom: Animalia
- Phylum: Chordata
- Class: Actinopterygii
- Order: Cypriniformes
- Family: Cyprinidae
- Subfamily: Labeoninae
- Genus: Labeo
- Species: L. roseopunctatus

Binomial name
- Labeo roseopunctatus Paugy, Guégan & Agnèse, 1990

Species of fish

Labeo roseopunctatus is a species of fish in the genus Labeo which occurs in the upper reaches of the Senegal and Niger River basins in Guinea and Mali.
