= Labeo lineatus =

Conservation status
- Least Concern (IUCN 3.1)

Scientific classification
- Kingdom: Animalia
- Phylum: Chordata
- Class: Actinopterygii
- Order: Cypriniformes
- Family: Cyprinidae
- Subfamily: Labeoninae
- Genus: Labeo
- Species: L. lineatus

Binomial name
- Labeo lineatus Boulenger, 1898

Species of fish

Labeo lineatus is a species of ray-finned fish in the family Cyprinidae. It is found only throughout the Congo Basin. Its natural habitats are rivers and freshwater lakes.
