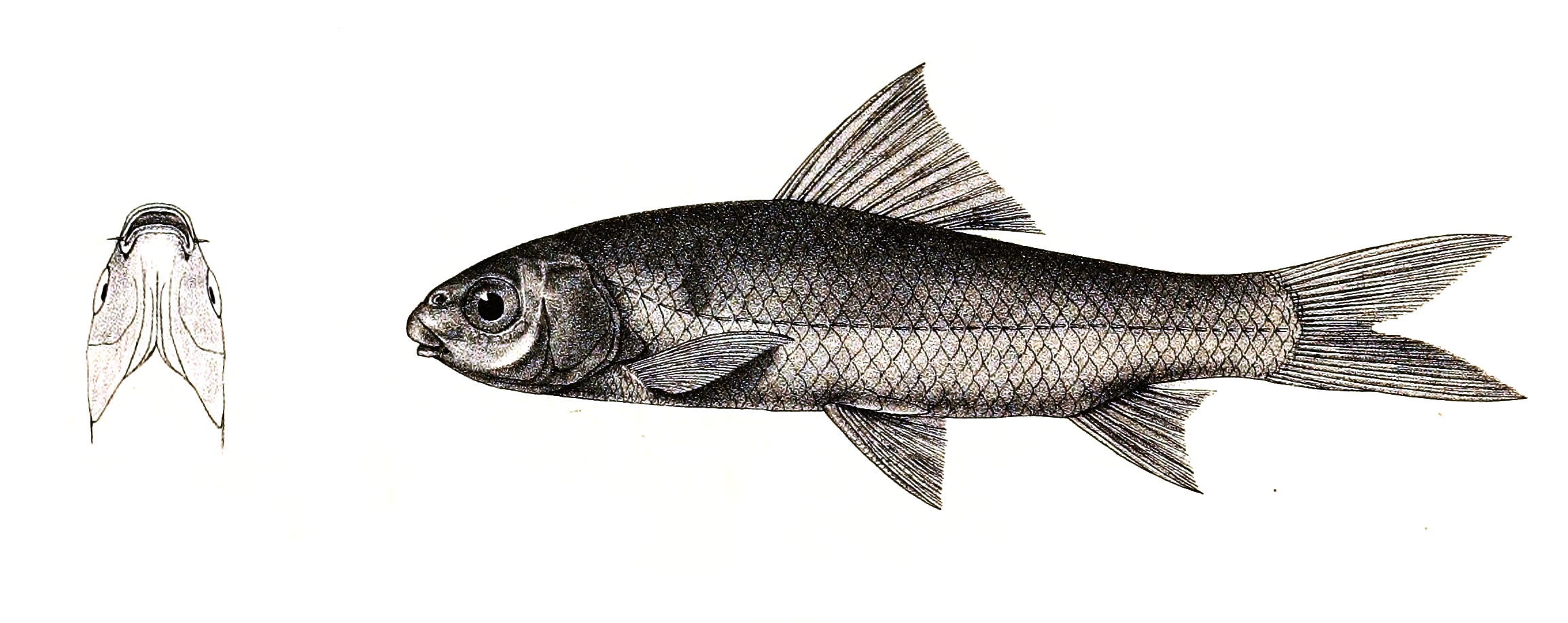

Conservation status
- Least Concern (IUCN 3.1)

Scientific classification
- Kingdom: Animalia
- Phylum: Chordata
- Class: Actinopterygii
- Order: Cypriniformes
- Family: Cyprinidae
- Subfamily: Labeoninae
- Genus: Labeo
- Species: L. boga

Binomial name
- Labeo boga F. Hamilton, 1822

Synonyms
- Cyprinus boga Hamilton, 1822; Cirrhina boga (Hamilton, 1822); Gobio boga (Hamilton, 1822); Cyprinus falcatus Bloch, 1795

= Labeo boga =

Species of fish

Labeo boga is fish in genus Labeo. It is in the family Cyprinidae and the Actinopterygii class which is widespread in India, Nepal, Bangladesh, Pakistan and Myanmar.
