= Labeo degeni =

Conservation status
- Least Concern (IUCN 3.1)

Scientific classification
- Kingdom: Animalia
- Phylum: Chordata
- Class: Actinopterygii
- Order: Cypriniformes
- Family: Cyprinidae
- Subfamily: Labeoninae
- Genus: Labeo
- Species: L. degeni

Binomial name
- Labeo degeni Boulenger, 1920

Species of fish

Labeo degeni is fish in genus Labeo from the Congo River.
