= Fuelleborn's labeo =

Conservation status
- Data Deficient (IUCN 3.1)

Scientific classification
- Kingdom: Animalia
- Phylum: Chordata
- Class: Actinopterygii
- Order: Cypriniformes
- Family: Cyprinidae
- Subfamily: Labeoninae
- Genus: Labeo
- Species: L. fuelleborni

Binomial name
- Labeo fuelleborni Hilgendorf & Pappenheim, 1903

Species of fish

The Fuelleborn's labeo (Labeo fuelleborni) is an African species of freshwater fish in the family Cyprinidae. It is found in Burundi and Tanzania in the Lake Rukwa basin, Lake Tanganyika and the Malagarasi River. Its natural habitats are rivers, freshwater lakes, and inland deltas. Its status is insufficiently known.
