= Labeo reidi =

Conservation status
- Data Deficient (IUCN 3.1)

Scientific classification
- Kingdom: Animalia
- Phylum: Chordata
- Class: Actinopterygii
- Order: Cypriniformes
- Family: Cyprinidae
- Subfamily: Labeoninae
- Genus: Labeo
- Species: L. reidi

Binomial name
- Labeo reidi Tshibwabwa, 1997

Species of fish

Labeo reidi is a species of fish in the genus Labeo.

It is known only from the Upper Congo River (Kisangani and Yangambi) in Africa.
