= Labeo quadribarbis =

Conservation status
- Least Concern (IUCN 3.1)

Scientific classification
- Kingdom: Animalia
- Phylum: Chordata
- Class: Actinopterygii
- Order: Cypriniformes
- Family: Cyprinidae
- Subfamily: Labeoninae
- Genus: Labeo
- Species: L. quadribarbis

Binomial name
- Labeo quadribarbis Poll & J. P. Gosse, 1963

Species of fish

Labeo quadribarbis is a species of fish in the genus Labeo. It is known only from the Middle Congo River in Africa.

The species has a nearly rounded body, rounded snout and two large pairs of barbels. They pose no risk to humans.
