= Labeo curriei =

Conservation status
- Critically Endangered (IUCN 3.1)

Scientific classification
- Domain: Eukaryota
- Kingdom: Animalia
- Phylum: Chordata
- Class: Actinopterygii
- Order: Cypriniformes
- Family: Cyprinidae
- Subfamily: Labeoninae
- Genus: Labeo
- Species: L. curriei

Binomial name
- Labeo curriei Fowler, 1919

Species of fish

Labeo curriei is fish in genus Labeo. It is found in the Saint Paul River in Liberia. It may also be present in the Corubal River in Guinea-Bissau.
