= Rednose labeo =

Conservation status
- Least Concern (IUCN 3.1)

Scientific classification
- Kingdom: Animalia
- Phylum: Chordata
- Class: Actinopterygii
- Order: Cypriniformes
- Family: Cyprinidae
- Subfamily: Labeoninae
- Genus: Labeo
- Species: L. altivelis

Binomial name
- Labeo altivelis Peters, 1852

Species of fish

The rednose labeo (Labeo altivelis) is a species of fish in the family Cyprinidae, the carps and minnows. Other common names include Hunyani labeo, Manyame labeo, rednose mudsucker, and sailfin mudsucker. It is native to Africa, where it is distributed in the Democratic Republic of the Congo, Malawi, Mozambique, Zambia, and Zimbabwe.

This fish is about 27 centimetres (11 in) long at maturity. It has been known to reach 49 centimetres (19 in) in length and 3.6 kilograms (7.9 lb) in weight. Its maximum reported age is nine years.

This species is widely distributed in several African river systems and lakes, including the Congo, Luapala, Shire, Zambezi, Pungwe, Save, and Buzi Rivers and Lakes Mweru and Bangweulu. It is potamodromous, undertaking a migration through the river systems and into tributaries during the rainy season. In some areas, such as the Shire River of Malawi, it leaves the swollen rivers and swims out onto the floodplains, where it spawns.

The fish is benthopelagic, moving through deeper waters over the substrate, and grazing on algae and aufwuchs.

This is a food fish of seasonal commercial importance in some parts of its range. Its spawning events, known locally as kapata, can involve large aggregations of adult fish. During the spawning migration, many fish gather in the shallows of the floodplains, where they are easy to catch. The eggs are also collected for caviar. Overfishing occurs in some areas, and the resource is managed by some governments.
