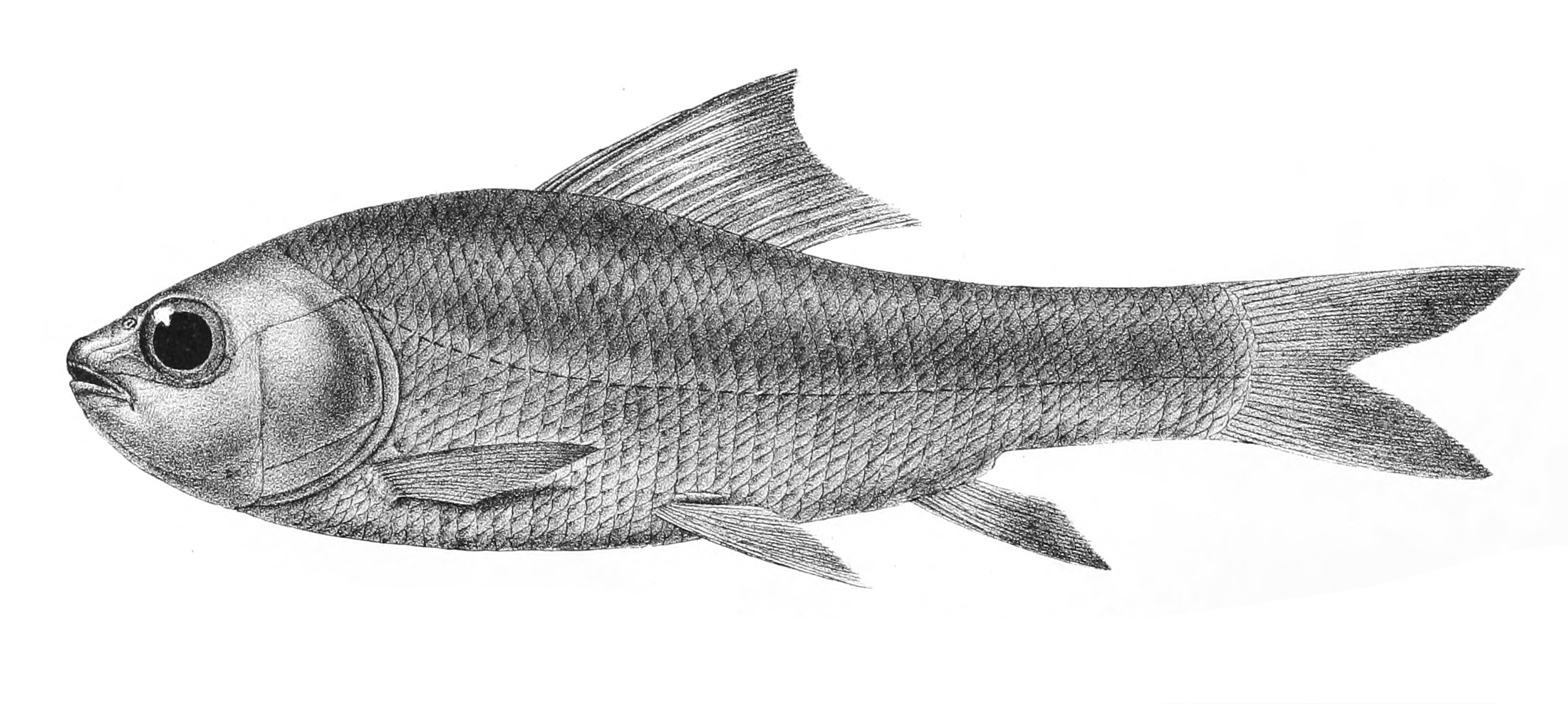

Conservation status
- Data Deficient (IUCN 3.1)

Scientific classification
- Kingdom: Animalia
- Phylum: Chordata
- Class: Actinopterygii
- Order: Cypriniformes
- Family: Cyprinidae
- Subfamily: Labeoninae
- Genus: Labeo
- Species: L. stolizkae

Binomial name
- Labeo stolizkae Steindachner, 1870

= Labeo stolizkae =

Species of fish

Labeo stolizkae is a species of freshwater ray-finned fish from the cyprinid genus Labeo which has only been recorded from the Irrawaddy and Salween Rivers in Myanmar.
