= Labeo longipinnis =

Conservation status
- Least Concern (IUCN 3.1)

Scientific classification
- Kingdom: Animalia
- Phylum: Chordata
- Class: Actinopterygii
- Order: Cypriniformes
- Family: Cyprinidae
- Subfamily: Labeoninae
- Genus: Labeo
- Species: L. longipinnis

Binomial name
- Labeo longipinnis Boulenger, 1898

Synonyms
- Labeo velifer Boulenger, 1898

Species of fish

Labeo longipinnis is fish in genus Labeo from the Congo Basin and Lake Tanganyika.
