= Labeo simpsoni =

Conservation status
- Least Concern (IUCN 3.1)

Scientific classification
- Domain: Eukaryota
- Kingdom: Animalia
- Phylum: Chordata
- Class: Actinopterygii
- Order: Cypriniformes
- Family: Cyprinidae
- Subfamily: Labeoninae
- Genus: Labeo
- Species: L. simpsoni

Binomial name
- Labeo simpsoni Ricardo-Bertram, 1943

Species of fish

Labeo simpsoni is a species of freshwater cyprinid fish in the genus Labeo. It is found only in Africa: in the middle and upper parts of the Congo River.
