= Labeo kibimbi =

Conservation status
- Least Concern (IUCN 3.1)

Scientific classification
- Kingdom: Animalia
- Phylum: Chordata
- Class: Actinopterygii
- Order: Cypriniformes
- Family: Cyprinidae
- Subfamily: Labeoninae
- Genus: Labeo
- Species: L. kibimbi

Binomial name
- Labeo kibimbi Poll, 1949

Species of fish

Labeo kibimbi is fish in genus Labeo from the upper Lualaba and Lake Tanganyika in the Democratic Republic of the Congo.
