= Labeo chariensis =

Conservation status
- Least Concern (IUCN 3.1)

Scientific classification
- Kingdom: Animalia
- Phylum: Chordata
- Class: Actinopterygii
- Order: Cypriniformes
- Family: Cyprinidae
- Genus: Labeo
- Species: L. chariensis

Binomial name
- Labeo chariensis Pellegrin, 1904

Species of fish

Labeo chariensis is a species of freshwater fish belonging to the genus Labeo. It is found in the Congo River basin.
