= Labeo trigliceps =

Conservation status
- Vulnerable (IUCN 3.1)

Scientific classification
- Kingdom: Animalia
- Phylum: Chordata
- Class: Actinopterygii
- Order: Cypriniformes
- Family: Cyprinidae
- Subfamily: Labeoninae
- Genus: Labeo
- Species: L. trigliceps

Binomial name
- Labeo trigliceps Pellegrin, 1926

Species of fish

Labeo trigliceps is a species of ray-finned fish in the family Cyprinidae. It is found only in the Athi River in Kenya. Its natural habitat is rivers. Its taxonomic status is uncertain and the specimens taken so far may be aberrant specimens of Labeo cylindricus.
