= Labeo alticentralis =

Conservation status
- Data Deficient (IUCN 3.1)

Scientific classification
- Kingdom: Animalia
- Phylum: Chordata
- Class: Actinopterygii
- Order: Cypriniformes
- Family: Cyprinidae
- Subfamily: Labeoninae
- Genus: Labeo
- Species: L. alticentralis

Binomial name
- Labeo alticentralis Tshibwabwa, 1997

Species of fish

Labeo alticentralis is a species of fish in the family Cyprinidae, the carps and minnows. It is endemic to the Democratic Republic of the Congo, where it has been recorded from just a few locations, including two near Kisangani and one at Pool Malebo, a section of the Congo River.

This benthopelagic freshwater fish reaches about 12.6 centimeters in maximum length and has dark brown longitudinal stripes along its body.
