= Labeo worthingtoni =

Conservation status
- Extinct (after 1932) (IUCN 3.1)

Scientific classification
- Kingdom: Animalia
- Phylum: Chordata
- Class: Actinopterygii
- Order: Cypriniformes
- Family: Cyprinidae
- Subfamily: Labeoninae
- Genus: Labeo
- Species: †L. worthingtoni

Binomial name
- †Labeo worthingtoni Fowler, 1958

Synonyms
- Labeo intermedius Worthington, 1933

Species of fish

Labeo worthingtoni is a species of benthopelagic, freshwater ray-finned fish in genus Labeo which was endemic to Lake Malawi and is now considered extinct.
