= Labeo forskalii =

Conservation status
- Least Concern (IUCN 3.1)

Scientific classification
- Kingdom: Animalia
- Phylum: Chordata
- Class: Actinopterygii
- Order: Cypriniformes
- Family: Cyprinidae
- Subfamily: Labeoninae
- Genus: Labeo
- Species: L. forskalii

Binomial name
- Labeo forskalii Rüppell, 1835

Species of fish

Labeo forskalii is fish in genus Labeo from Northeast and East Africa. The maximum total length of the species is 36 cm (14 in). It is under heavy fishing pressure in Uganda.
