= Labeo filiferus =

Scientific classification
- Kingdom: Animalia
- Phylum: Chordata
- Class: Actinopterygii
- Division: Teleostei
- Order: Cypriniformes
- Family: Cyprinidae
- Genus: Labeo
- Species: L. filiferus

Binomial name
- Labeo filiferus Plamoottil & Zupančič, 2017

Species of fish

Labeo filiferus is a species of freshwater fish belonging to the genus Labeo. It was recently found from Pamba River, Kerala, India.
