= Labeo pierrei =

Conservation status
- Vulnerable (IUCN 3.1)

Scientific classification
- Kingdom: Animalia
- Phylum: Chordata
- Class: Actinopterygii
- Order: Cypriniformes
- Family: Cyprinidae
- Genus: Labeo
- Species: L. pierrei

Binomial name
- Labeo pierrei (Sauvage, 1880)

Synonyms
- Bangana pierrei; Lobochilus pierrei

Species of fish

Labeo pierrei is a species of freshwater ray-finned fish in the genus Labeo native to the Mekong, Đồng Nai, and Chao Phraya basins in Cambodia, Thailand, and Vietnam.
