= Gregori's labeo =

Conservation status
- Least Concern (IUCN 3.1)

Scientific classification
- Kingdom: Animalia
- Phylum: Chordata
- Class: Actinopterygii
- Order: Cypriniformes
- Family: Cyprinidae
- Genus: Labeo
- Species: L. gregorii

Binomial name
- Labeo gregorii Boulenger, 1894

Species of fish

Gregori's labeo (Labeo gregorii) is fish in genus Labeo. It is found in the Tana and Galana Rivers in Kenya and Tanzania. IUCN reports it also from Juba, Somalia, and does not include Tanzania in the distribution area.
