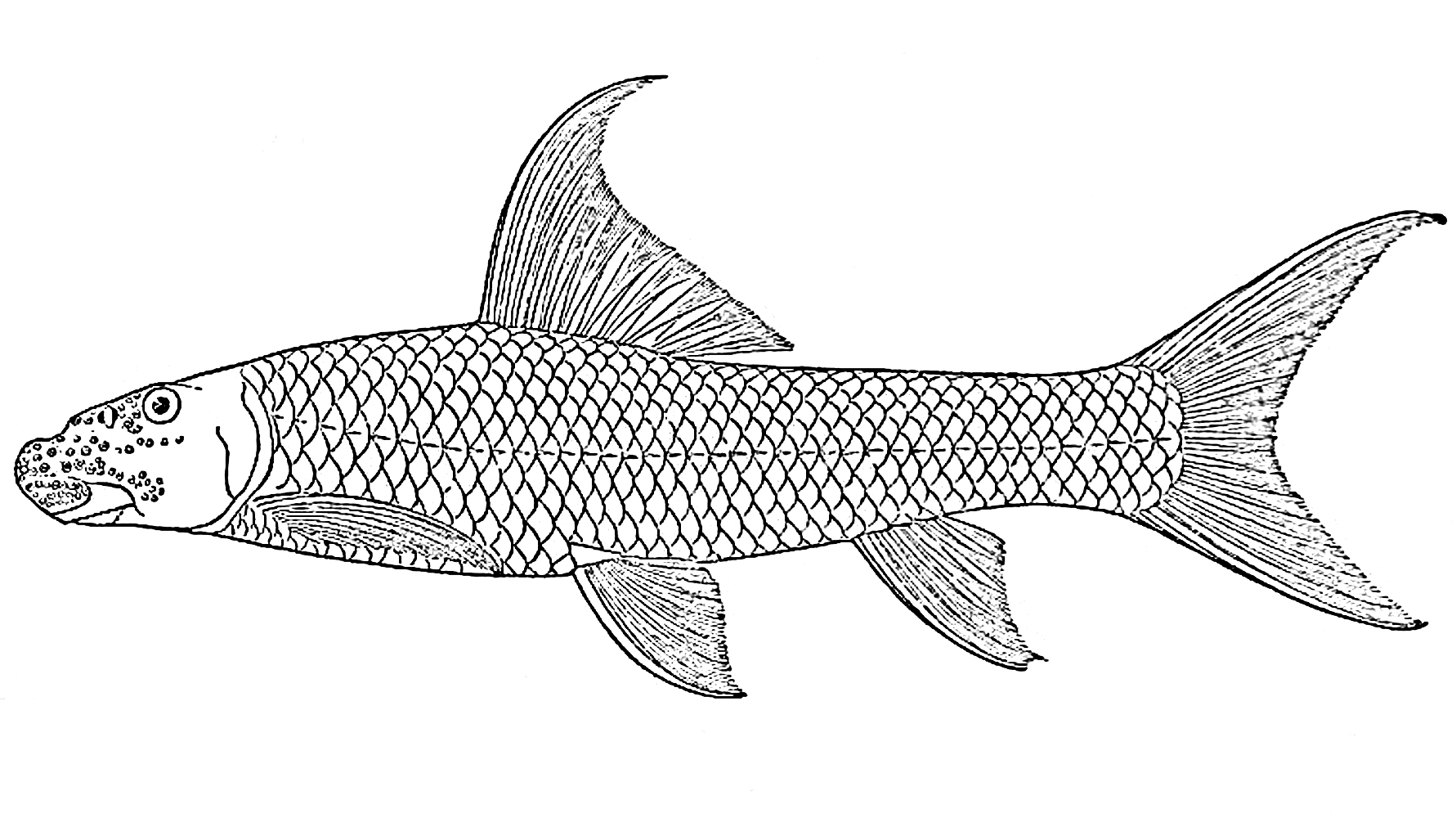

Conservation status
- Least Concern (IUCN 3.1)

Scientific classification
- Kingdom: Animalia
- Phylum: Chordata
- Class: Actinopterygii
- Order: Cypriniformes
- Family: Cyprinidae
- Subfamily: Labeoninae
- Genus: Labeo
- Species: L. ansorgii

Binomial name
- Labeo ansorgii Boulenger, 1907

Synonyms
- Labeo rocadasi Boulenger, 1910

= Cunene labeo =

Species of fish

The Cunene labeo or Kunene labeo (Labeo ansorgii) is a species of fish in the family Cyprinidae, the carps and minnows. It is native to Angola and Namibia.

This fish occupies rocky habitat in flowing river waters. It is recorded from the Bengo, Cuanza, and Cunene Rivers.

Little is known about the biology or population sizes of this fish. It faces no apparent threats except a dam on the Cunene River, which separates populations on the upper river from those on the lower parts.
