= Labeo nigrescens =

Scientific classification
- Kingdom: Animalia
- Phylum: Chordata
- Class: Actinopterygii
- Order: Cypriniformes
- Family: Cyprinidae
- Genus: Labeo
- Species: L. nigrescens

Binomial name
- Labeo nigrescens Day, 1870

Species of fish

Labeo nigrescens is a species of freshwater fish belonging to the genus Labeo. It is endemic to Karnataka in India. It is sometimes considered conspecific with Labeo calbasu.
