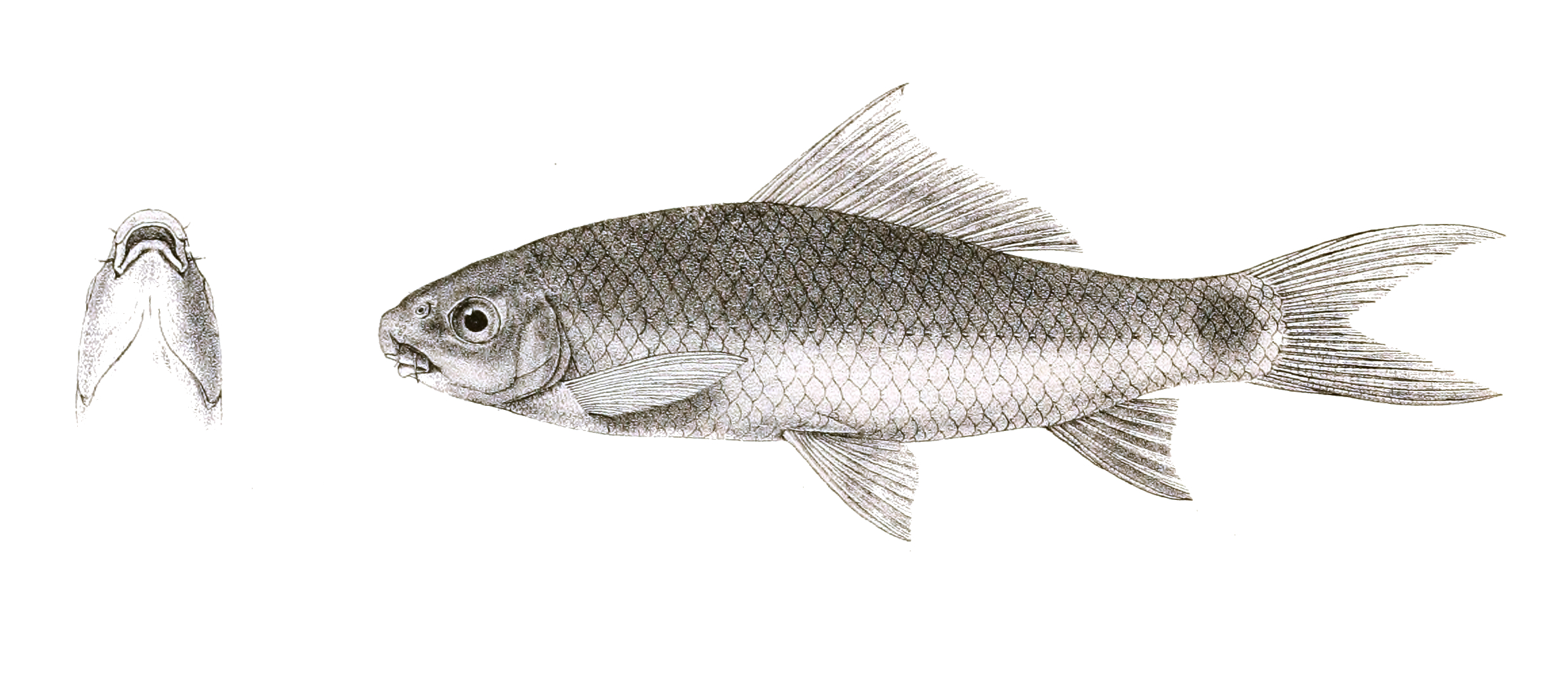

Conservation status
- Least Concern (IUCN 3.1)

Scientific classification
- Kingdom: Animalia
- Phylum: Chordata
- Class: Actinopterygii
- Division: Teleostei
- Order: Cypriniformes
- Family: Cyprinidae
- Subfamily: Labeoninae
- Genus: Labeo
- Species: L. porcellus

Binomial name
- Labeo porcellus (Heckel, 1844)

Synonyms
- Tylognathus porcellus Heckel, 1844; Labeo lankae Deraniyagala, 1952

= Labeo porcellus =

Species of fish

Labeo porcellus is a species of fish in the family Cyprinidae, the carps and minnows. Its common name is the Bombay labeo. It is native to India.

This species reaches about 20 to 30 centimeters in length. It is a freshwater fish that inhabits rivers and reservoirs.

While it has a relatively wide distribution, the species is rare in parts of its range and is known from no more than 10 locations. It is believed to be declining, but there is not enough data to list it as a threatened species. Causes of its decline may include overexploitation, pollution, and introduced species of fish such as carps.
