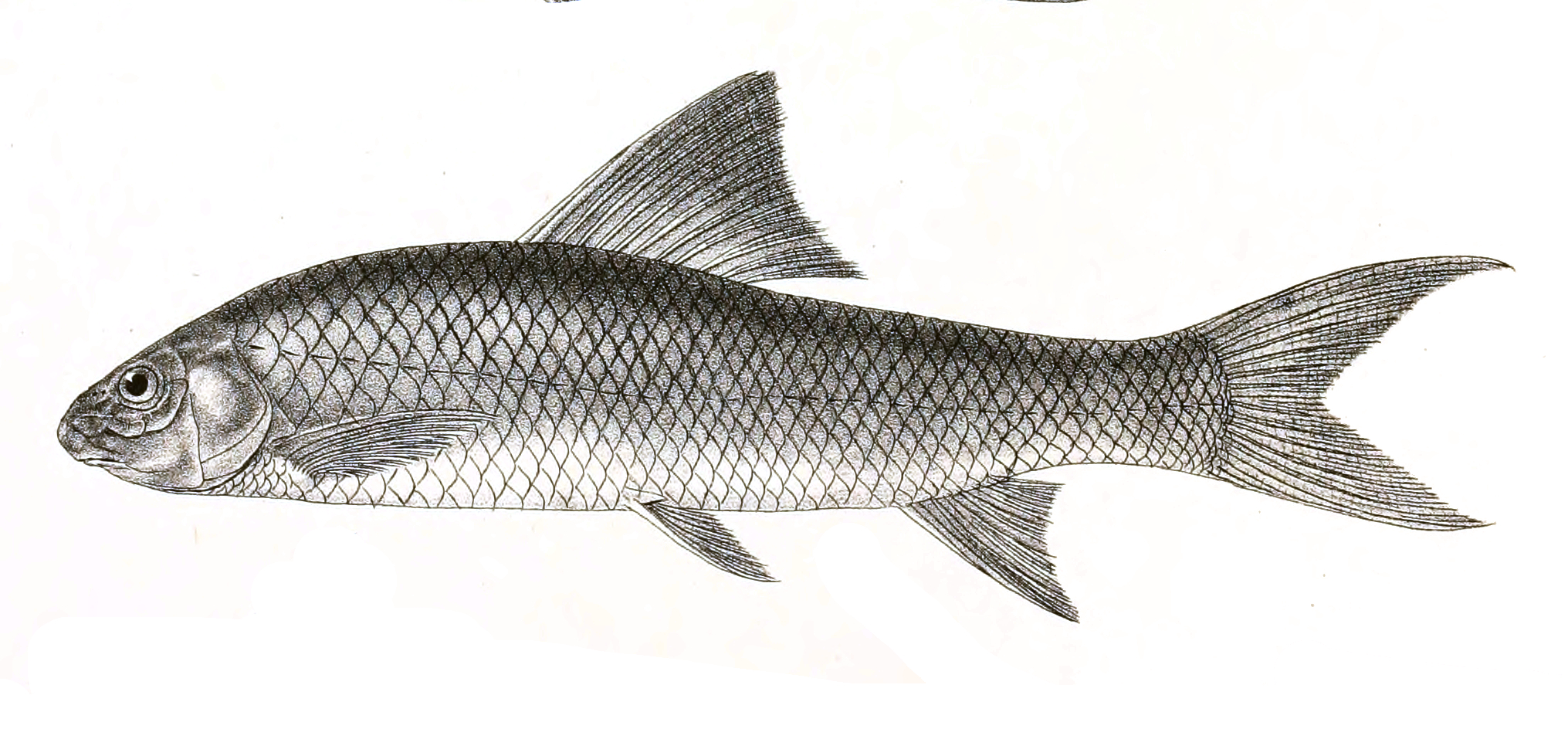

Conservation status
- Least Concern (IUCN 3.1)

Scientific classification
- Kingdom: Animalia
- Phylum: Chordata
- Class: Actinopterygii
- Order: Cypriniformes
- Family: Cyprinidae
- Subfamily: Labeoninae
- Genus: Labeo
- Species: L. microphthalmus

Binomial name
- Labeo microphthalmus F. Day, 1877

= Labeo microphthalmus =

Species of fish

Labeo microphthalmus is fish in the Cyprinid genus Labeo from north western India and Pakistan
