= Labeo senegalensis =

Conservation status
- Least Concern (IUCN 3.1)

Scientific classification
- Kingdom: Animalia
- Phylum: Chordata
- Class: Actinopterygii
- Order: Cypriniformes
- Family: Cyprinidae
- Subfamily: Labeoninae
- Genus: Labeo
- Species: L. senegalensis

Binomial name
- Labeo senegalensis Valenciennes, 1842

Synonyms
- Rohitichthys senegalensis (Valenciennes, 1842)

Species of fish

Labeo senegalensis is a species of freshwater ray-finned fish in the genus Labeo from West Africa.
