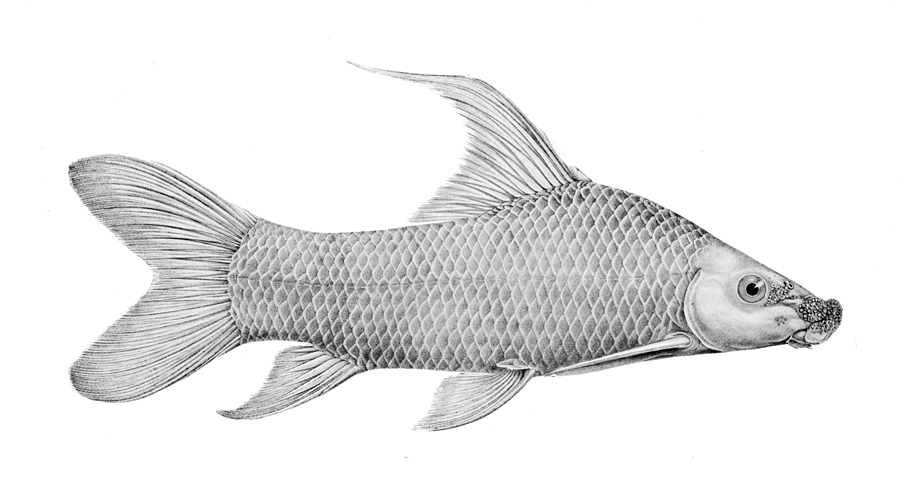

Conservation status
- Least Concern (IUCN 3.1)

Scientific classification
- Kingdom: Animalia
- Phylum: Chordata
- Class: Actinopterygii
- Order: Cypriniformes
- Family: Cyprinidae
- Subfamily: Labeoninae
- Genus: Labeo
- Species: L. barbatus

Binomial name
- Labeo barbatus Boulenger, 1898

= Labeo barbatus =

Species of fish

Labeo barbatus is fish in genus Labeo which occurs in the Lower and Central Congo River basin.
