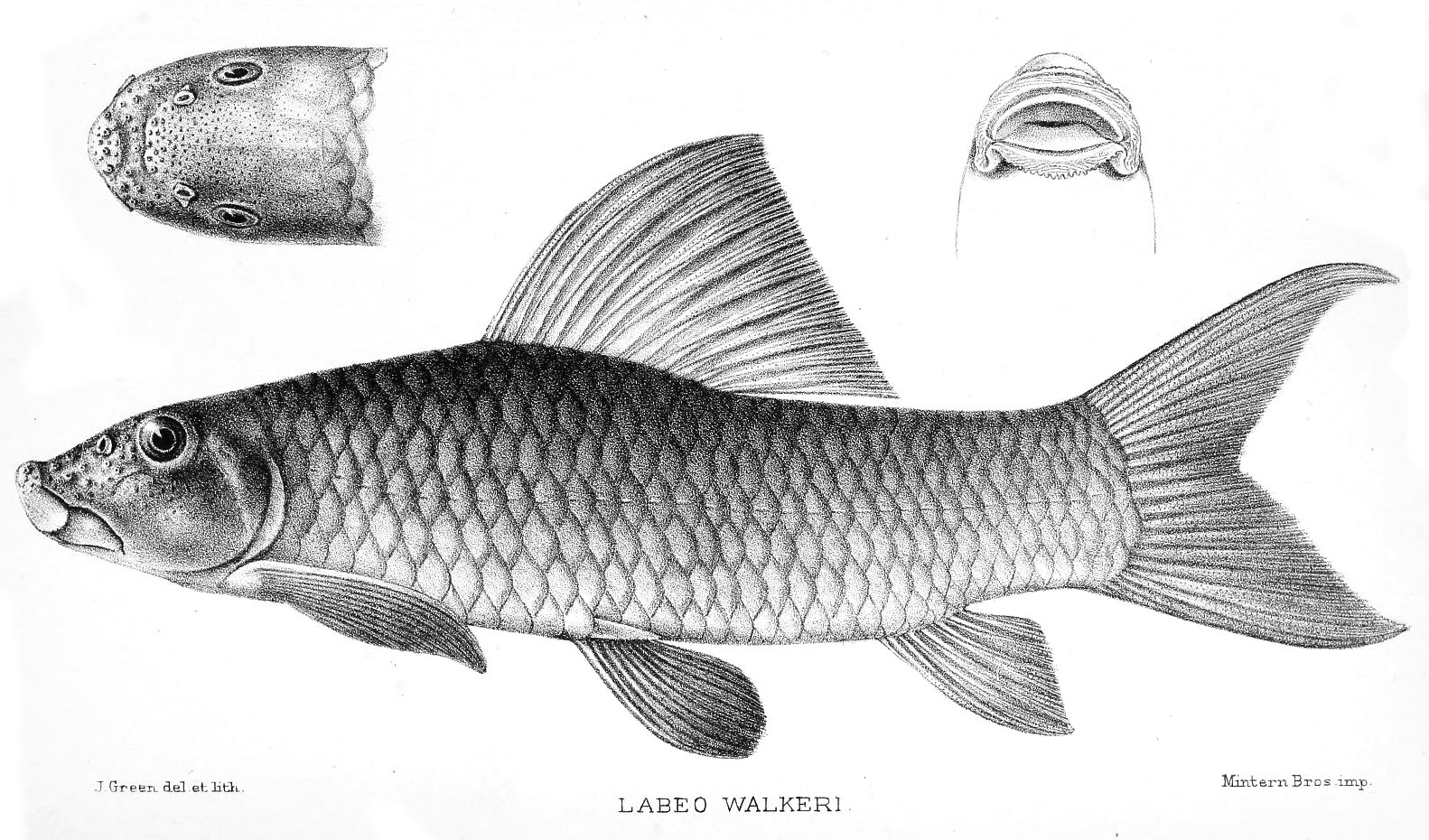

Conservation status
- Data Deficient (IUCN 3.1)

Scientific classification
- Kingdom: Animalia
- Phylum: Chordata
- Class: Actinopterygii
- Order: Cypriniformes
- Family: Cyprinidae
- Subfamily: Labeoninae
- Genus: Labeo
- Species: L. brachypoma

Binomial name
- Labeo brachypoma Günther, 1868

Synonyms
- Labeo walkeri Günther, 1903

= Labeo brachypoma =

Species of fish

Labeo brachypoma is fish in genus Labeo which comes from west Africa, probably western Nigeria where the type specimens were most likely to have been collected.
