= Tana labeo =

Conservation status
- Critically Endangered (IUCN 3.1)

Scientific classification
- Kingdom: Animalia
- Phylum: Chordata
- Class: Actinopterygii
- Order: Cypriniformes
- Family: Cyprinidae
- Genus: Labeo
- Species: L. mesops

Binomial name
- Labeo mesops Günther, 1868

Synonyms
- Labeo gracilis Boulenger, 1916; Labeo grammipleura Vinciguerra, 1927

Species of fish

The Tana labeo (Labeo mesops) is a species of ray-finned fish in the family Cyprinidae. It is endemic to Lake Malawi and the Shire River in Malawi. Its natural habitats are rivers and freshwater lakes. It is threatened by habitat loss and overfishing.
