= Hongshuia megalophthalmus =

Scientific classification
- Kingdom: Animalia
- Phylum: Chordata
- Class: Actinopterygii
- Order: Cypriniformes
- Family: Cyprinidae
- Subfamily: Labeoninae
- Genus: Hongshuia
- Species: H. megalophthalmus

Binomial name
- Hongshuia megalophthalmus Chen, Yang, & Cui, 2006

Synonyms
- Sinocrossocheilus megalophthalmus

Species of fish

Hongshuia megalophthalmus is a species of cyprinid fish in the genus Hongshuia endemic to China. It is sometimes placed in the genus Sinocrossocheilus.
