= Vinagarra findolabium =

Scientific classification
- Domain: Eukaryota
- Kingdom: Animalia
- Phylum: Chordata
- Class: Actinopterygii
- Order: Cypriniformes
- Family: Cyprinidae
- Subfamily: Labeoninae
- Genus: Vinagarra
- Species: V. findolabium

Binomial name
- Vinagarra findolabium (F. L. Li, W. Zhou & Q. Fu, 2008)

Synonyms
- Garra findolabium

Species of fish

Vinagarra findolabium is a species of ray-finned fish in the genus Vinagarra.
