= Parasinilabeo longicorpus =

Scientific classification
- Domain: Eukaryota
- Kingdom: Animalia
- Phylum: Chordata
- Class: Actinopterygii
- Order: Cypriniformes
- Family: Cyprinidae
- Subfamily: Labeoninae
- Genus: Parasinilabeo
- Species: P. longicorpus

Binomial name
- Parasinilabeo longicorpus Zhang, 2000

Species of fish

Parasinilabeo longicorpus is a species of cyprinid fish endemic to China.
