= Parasinilabeo longiventralis =

Scientific classification
- Domain: Eukaryota
- Kingdom: Animalia
- Phylum: Chordata
- Class: Actinopterygii
- Order: Cypriniformes
- Family: Cyprinidae
- Subfamily: Labeoninae
- Genus: Parasinilabeo
- Species: P. longiventralis

Binomial name
- Parasinilabeo longiventralis Huang, Chen, & Yang, 2007

Species of fish

Parasinilabeo longiventralis is a species of cyprinid fish endemic to the Fuchuanjiang River in China.
