= Parasinilabeo microps =

Scientific classification
- Kingdom: Animalia
- Phylum: Chordata
- Class: Actinopterygii
- Order: Cypriniformes
- Family: Cyprinidae
- Subfamily: Labeoninae
- Genus: Parasinilabeo
- Species: P. microps

Binomial name
- Parasinilabeo microps (Su, Yang, & Cui, 2001)

Synonyms
- Pararectoris microps

Species of fish

Parasinilabeo microps is a species of cyprinid fish endemic to China.
