= Placocheilus imbarbatus =

Scientific classification
- Kingdom: Animalia
- Phylum: Chordata
- Class: Actinopterygii
- Division: Teleostei
- Order: Cypriniformes
- Family: Cyprinidae
- Subfamily: Labeoninae
- Genus: Placocheilus
- Species: P. imbarbatus

Binomial name
- Placocheilus imbarbatus V. H. Nguyễn, 2001

Synonyms
- Garra imbarbata (Nguyễn, 2001)

Species of fish

Placocheilus imbarbatus is a species of cyprinid fish in the genus Placocheilus from Vietnam.
