= Vinagarra laichowensis =

Scientific classification
- Kingdom: Animalia
- Phylum: Chordata
- Class: Actinopterygii
- Division: Teleostei
- Order: Cypriniformes
- Family: Cyprinidae
- Subfamily: Labeoninae
- Genus: Vinagarra
- Species: V. laichowensis

Binomial name
- Vinagarra laichowensis (V. H. Nguyễn & L. H. Doan, 1969)

Synonyms
- Placocheilus laichowensis; Garra laichowensis

Species of fish

Vinagarra laichowensis is a species of ray-finned fish in the genus Vinagarra.
