= Semilabeo notabilis =

Conservation status
- Data Deficient (IUCN 3.1)

Scientific classification
- Kingdom: Animalia
- Phylum: Chordata
- Class: Actinopterygii
- Order: Cypriniformes
- Family: Cyprinidae
- Subfamily: Labeoninae
- Genus: Semilabeo
- Species: S. notabilis

Binomial name
- Semilabeo notabilis W. K. H. Peters, 1881

Synonyms
- Amplolabrius mirus S. Y. Lin, 1933

Species of fish

Semilabeo notabilis is a species of freshwater ray-finned fish belonging to the family Cyprinidae, the family which includes the carps, barbs. minnows and related fishes. This fish is found in the Jingshajiang sub-basin of the Yangtze and in the basins of the Pearl River and the Red River in southern China and northern Viet Nam.

== See also ==
- Vietnam's Red Data Book
