= Ageneiogarra nujiangensis =

Conservation status
- Data Deficient (IUCN 3.1)

Scientific classification
- Domain: Eukaryota
- Kingdom: Animalia
- Phylum: Chordata
- Class: Actinopterygii
- Order: Cypriniformes
- Family: Cyprinidae
- Subfamily: Labeoninae
- Genus: Ageneiogarra
- Species: A. nujiangensis

Binomial name
- Ageneiogarra nujiangensis (Z. M. Chen, S. Zhao & J. X. Yang, 2009)

Synonyms
- Garra nujiangensis Z. M. Chen & J. X. Yang, 2009

Species of fish

Ageneiogarra nujiangensis is a species of cyprinid fish in the genus Ageneiogarra from Yunnan province, China.
