= Hongshuia banmo =

Scientific classification
- Kingdom: Animalia
- Phylum: Chordata
- Class: Actinopterygii
- Order: Cypriniformes
- Family: Cyprinidae
- Subfamily: Labeoninae
- Genus: Hongshuia
- Species: H. banmo

Binomial name
- Hongshuia banmo Zhang, Qiang, & Lan, 2008

Species of fish

Hongshuia banmo is a species of cyprinid fish in the genus Hongshuia endemic to China.
