= Ageneiogarra theunensis =

Conservation status
- Least Concern (IUCN 3.1)

Scientific classification
- Domain: Eukaryota
- Kingdom: Animalia
- Phylum: Chordata
- Class: Actinopterygii
- Order: Cypriniformes
- Family: Cyprinidae
- Subfamily: Labeoninae
- Genus: Ageneiogarra
- Species: A. theunensis

Binomial name
- Ageneiogarra theunensis (Kottelat, 1998)

Synonyms
- Garra theuensis Kottelat, 1998

Species of fish

Ageneiogarra theunensis is a species of ray-finned fish in the genus Ageneiogarra from Laos.
