= Placocheilus bibarbatus =

Conservation status
- Data Deficient (IUCN 3.1)

Scientific classification
- Kingdom: Animalia
- Phylum: Chordata
- Class: Actinopterygii
- Division: Teleostei
- Order: Cypriniformes
- Family: Cyprinidae
- Subfamily: Labeoninae
- Genus: Placocheilus
- Species: P. bibarbatus

Binomial name
- Placocheilus bibarbatus V. H. Nguyễn, 2001

Synonyms
- Garra bibarbatus (Nguyen, 2001)

Species of fish

Placocheilus bibarbatus is a species of ray-finned fish in the genus Placocheilus from Vietnam.
