= Parasinilabeo maculatus =

Scientific classification
- Domain: Eukaryota
- Kingdom: Animalia
- Phylum: Chordata
- Class: Actinopterygii
- Order: Cypriniformes
- Family: Cyprinidae
- Subfamily: Labeoninae
- Genus: Parasinilabeo
- Species: P. maculatus

Binomial name
- Parasinilabeo maculatus Zhang, 2000

Species of fish

Parasinilabeo maculatus is a species of cyprinid fish endemic to China.
