= Parasinilabeo longibarbus =

Scientific classification
- Kingdom: Animalia
- Phylum: Chordata
- Class: Actinopterygii
- Order: Cypriniformes
- Family: Cyprinidae
- Subfamily: Labeoninae
- Genus: Parasinilabeo
- Species: P. longibarbus

Binomial name
- Parasinilabeo longibarbus Zhu, Lan, & Zhang, 2006

Species of fish

Parasinilabeo longibarbus is a species of cyprinid fish endemic to China.
