= Cophecheilus bamen =

Conservation status
- Least Concern (IUCN 3.1)

Scientific classification
- Kingdom: Animalia
- Phylum: Chordata
- Class: Actinopterygii
- Order: Cypriniformes
- Family: Cyprinidae
- Subfamily: Labeoninae
- Genus: Cophecheilus; Y. Zhu, E. Zhang, M. Zhang & Y.Q. Han, 2011
- Species: C. bamen

Binomial name
- Cophecheilus bamen Y. Zhu, E. Zhang, M. Zhang & Y. Q. Han, 2011

Species of fish

Cophecheilus bamen is a species of fish in the family Cyprinidae, the carps and minnows. It was described in 2011 from a tributary of the Zou-Jiang, a river in the Pearl River drainage in Jingxi County, Guangxi, China. The species name bamen is from Ba Men, the local common name for this and similar fish.

This fish is distinguished from related species by the morphology of its mouth, including its lips and jaws. Specimens examined so far were an average of about 7.8 centimetres (3.1 in) long. The species has an elongated, laterally compressed body, two pairs of long barbels, and a forked caudal fin.
