= G. robustus =

G. robustus may refer to:

- Garra robustus, an Asian freshwater ray-finned fish species
- Gerbilliscus robustus, the fringe-tailed gerbil, a rodent species found in Africa
- Gymnopilus robustus, a mushroom species
