= Ageneiogarra apogon =

Conservation status
- Data Deficient (IUCN 3.1)

Scientific classification
- Kingdom: Animalia
- Phylum: Chordata
- Class: Actinopterygii
- Order: Cypriniformes
- Family: Cyprinidae
- Subfamily: Labeoninae
- Genus: Ageneiogarra
- Species: A. apogon

Binomial name
- Ageneiogarra apogon (Norman, 1925)

Synonyms
- Discognathus apogon Norman, 1925; Garra apogon (Norman, 1925)

Species of fish

Ageneiogarra apogon is a species of ray-finned fish in the subfamily Labeoninae.
