= Pseudocrossocheilus liuchengensis =

Conservation status
- Least Concern (IUCN 3.1)

Scientific classification
- Kingdom: Animalia
- Phylum: Chordata
- Class: Actinopterygii
- Order: Cypriniformes
- Family: Cyprinidae
- Subfamily: Labeoninae
- Genus: Pseudocrossocheilus
- Species: P. liuchengensis

Binomial name
- Pseudocrossocheilus liuchengensis (L. Liang, C. X. Liu and Q. L. Wu, 1987)

Synonyms
- Crossocheilus liuchengensis L. Liang, C. X. Liu and Q. L. Wu, 1987; Sinocrossocheilus liuchengensis (L. Liang, C. X. Liu and Q. L. Wu, 1987)

Species of fish

Pseudocrossocheilus liuchengensis, the oil fish, is a species of freshwater ray-finned fish belonging to the family Cyprinidae, the family which includes the carps, barbs, minnows and related fishes. This species is endemic to Guangxi where it lives only in subterranean rivers.
