= Sinilabeo longibarbatus =

Scientific classification
- Domain: Eukaryota
- Kingdom: Animalia
- Phylum: Chordata
- Class: Actinopterygii
- Order: Cypriniformes
- Family: Cyprinidae
- Genus: Sinilabeo
- Species: S. longibarbatus

Binomial name
- Sinilabeo longibarbatus J. X. Chen & J. Z. Zheng, 1988

Species of fish

Sinilabeo longibarbatus is a species of cyprinid of the genus Sinilabeo. It inhabits China and is considered harmless to humans. It has not been evaluated on the IUCN Red List.
