= Pseudocrossocheilus tridentis =

Conservation status
- Least Concern (IUCN 3.1)

Scientific classification
- Kingdom: Animalia
- Phylum: Chordata
- Class: Actinopterygii
- Order: Cypriniformes
- Family: Cyprinidae
- Subfamily: Labeoninae
- Genus: Pseudocrossocheilus
- Species: P. tridentis

Binomial name
- Pseudocrossocheilus tridentis (G. H. Cui & X. L. Chu, 1986)

Synonyms
- Sinocrossocheilus tridentis G. H. Cui & X. L. Chu, 1986

Species of fish

Pseudocrossocheilus tridentis is a species of freshwater ray-finned fish belonging to the family Cyprinidae, the family which includes the carps, barbs, minnows and related fishes. This fish has a wide distribution in the middle and lower Nanpan River in Yunnan and Guizhou. P. tridentis is found in the lower layers of fast-flowing rivers or montane streams>
