= Parapsilorhynchus discophorus =

Scientific classification
- Domain: Eukaryota
- Kingdom: Animalia
- Phylum: Chordata
- Class: Actinopterygii
- Order: Cypriniformes
- Family: Cyprinidae
- Genus: Parapsilorhynchus
- Species: P. discophorus

Binomial name
- Parapsilorhynchus discophorus Hora, 1921)

Species of fish

Parapsilorhynchus discophorus, commonly known as the Ratnagiri minnow, is indigenous to India.
