= Discocheilus wui =

Conservation status
- Data Deficient (IUCN 3.1)

Scientific classification
- Kingdom: Animalia
- Phylum: Chordata
- Class: Actinopterygii
- Order: Cypriniformes
- Family: Cyprinidae
- Subfamily: Labeoninae
- Genus: Discocheilus
- Species: D. wui

Binomial name
- Discocheilus wui (J. X. Chen & J. H. Lan, 1992)

Synonyms
- Discolabeo wui Chen & Lan, 1992

Species of fish

Discocheilus wui is a species of freshwater ray-finned fish belonging to the family Cyprinidae, the carps, barbs, minnows and related fishes. This species is found in the Hongshuihe River in Guangxi, southeastern China.
