= Schismatorhynchos holorhynchos =

Conservation status
- Least Concern (IUCN 3.1)

Scientific classification
- Kingdom: Animalia
- Phylum: Chordata
- Class: Actinopterygii
- Order: Cypriniformes
- Family: Cyprinidae
- Genus: Schismatorhynchos
- Species: S. holorhynchos

Binomial name
- Schismatorhynchos holorhynchos Siebert & Tjakrawidjaja, 1998

Species of fish

Schismatorhynchos holorhynchos is a species of freshwater ray-finned fish belonging to the family Cyprinidae, the family which includes the carps, barbs. minnows and related fishes. This species is endemic to Borneo where it occurs only in Eastern Malaysia, in the Rajang River system in Sarawak and Sabah and in the basin of the Kinabatangan River. It is found in fast flowing rivers with gravel, rocky or stony beds.
