= Pseudocrossocheilus nigrovittatus =

Scientific classification
- Kingdom: Animalia
- Phylum: Chordata
- Class: Actinopterygii
- Order: Cypriniformes
- Family: Cyprinidae
- Subfamily: Labeoninae
- Genus: Pseudocrossocheilus
- Species: P. nigrovittatus

Binomial name
- Pseudocrossocheilus nigrovittatus (R. F. Su, J. X. Yang & G. H. Cui, 2003)

Synonyms
- Sinocrossocheilus nigrovittata R. F. Su, J. X. Yang & G. H. Cui, 2003

Species of fish

Pseudocrossocheilus nigrovittatus is a species of freshwater ray-finned fish belonging to the family Cyprinidae, the family which includes the carps, barbs, minnows and related fishes. This species is found in fast flowing rivers in the middle Pearl River basin in Guizhou.
