= Pseudocrossocheilus longibullus =

Conservation status
- Data Deficient (IUCN 3.1)

Scientific classification
- Kingdom: Animalia
- Phylum: Chordata
- Class: Actinopterygii
- Order: Cypriniformes
- Family: Cyprinidae
- Subfamily: Labeoninae
- Genus: Pseudocrossocheilus
- Species: P. longibullus

Binomial name
- Pseudocrossocheilus longibullus ((R. F. Su, J. X. Yang & G. H. Cui, 2003)

Synonyms
- Sinocrossocheilus longibulla R. F. Su, J. X. Yang & G. H. Cui, 2003

Species of fish

Pseudocrossocheilus longibullus is a species of freshwater ray-finned fish belonging to the family Cyprinidae, the family which includes the carps, barbs, minnows and related fishes. This species is only known from its type locality, the Sancha River which is a tributary of the Xi River at Dongtanxiang, Libo County in Guizhou.
