= Vinagarra elongata =

Scientific classification
- Kingdom: Animalia
- Phylum: Chordata
- Class: Actinopterygii
- Division: Teleostei
- Order: Cypriniformes
- Family: Cyprinidae
- Genus: Vinagarra
- Species: V. elongata

Binomial name
- Vinagarra elongata V. H. Nguyễn & T. A. Bùi, 2010

Species of fish

Vinagarra elongata is a species of ray-finned fish in the genus Vinagarra.
