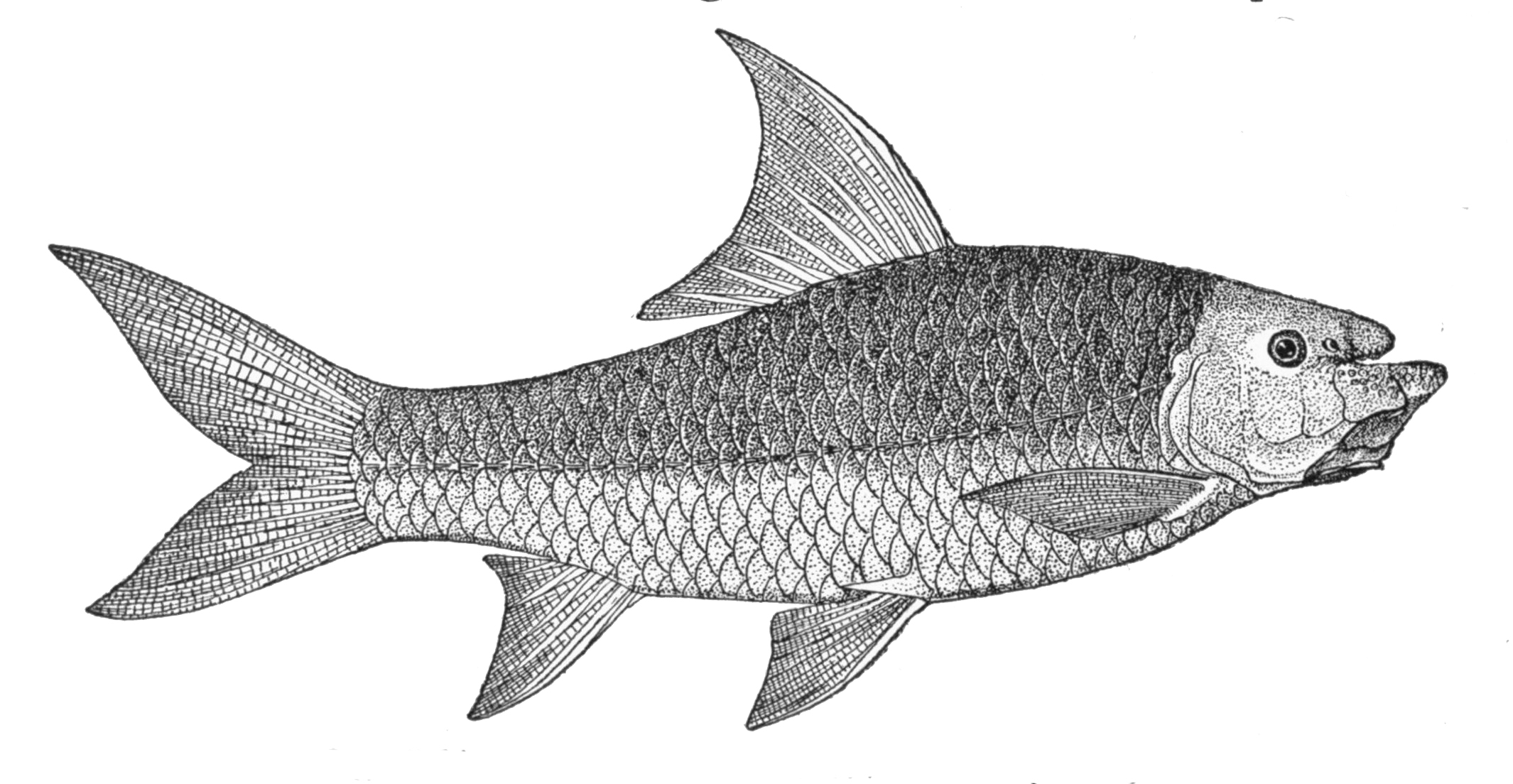

Conservation status
- Least Concern (IUCN 3.1)

Scientific classification
- Kingdom: Animalia
- Phylum: Chordata
- Class: Actinopterygii
- Order: Cypriniformes
- Family: Cyprinidae
- Genus: Schismatorhynchos
- Species: S. heterorhynchos

Binomial name
- Schismatorhynchos heterorhynchos (Bleeker, 1854)

Synonyms
- Schismatorhynchos lobocheliodes Bleeker, 1855; Lobocheilus heterorhynchos Bleeker, 1854; Tylognathus heterorhynchus (Bleeker, 1854)

= Schismatorhynchos heterorhynchos =

Species of fish

Schismatorhynchos heterorhynchos is a species of freshwater ray-finned fish belonging to the family Cyprinidae, the family which includes the carps, barbs. minnows and related fishes. This species is found in Indonesia where it occurs on Sumatra, in the drainage systems of the Indragiri, Batanghari, and Musi in the south of the island, and Borneo in the Sibau sub-basin of the Kapuas River in West Kalimantan.
