= Pseudocrossocheilus papillolabrus =

Scientific classification
- Kingdom: Animalia
- Phylum: Chordata
- Class: Actinopterygii
- Order: Cypriniformes
- Family: Cyprinidae
- Subfamily: Labeoninae
- Genus: Pseudocrossocheilus
- Species: P. papillolabrus

Binomial name
- Pseudocrossocheilus papillolabrus (R. F. Su, J. X. Yang & G. H. Cui, 2003)

Synonyms
- Sinocrossocheilus papillolabra R. F. Su, J. X. Yang & G. H. Cui, 2003

Species of fish

Pseudocrossocheilus papillolabrus is a species of freshwater ray-finned fish belonging to the family Cyprinidae. This species is found in rivers and fast flowing mountain streams in Guizhou.
