= Parasinilabeo assimilis =

Conservation status
- Vulnerable (IUCN 3.1)

Scientific classification
- Kingdom: Animalia
- Phylum: Chordata
- Class: Actinopterygii
- Order: Cypriniformes
- Family: Cyprinidae
- Subfamily: Labeoninae
- Genus: Parasinilabeo
- Species: P. assimilis

Binomial name
- Parasinilabeo assimilis Wu & Yao, 1977

Synonyms
- Pararectoris assimilis (Wu & Yao, 1997); invalid

Species of fish

Parasinilabeo assimilis is a species of cyprinid fish endemic to China.
