= Mekongina erythrospila =

Conservation status
- Near Threatened (IUCN 3.1)

Scientific classification
- Kingdom: Animalia
- Phylum: Chordata
- Class: Actinopterygii
- Order: Cypriniformes
- Family: Cyprinidae
- Subfamily: Labeoninae
- Genus: Mekongina
- Species: M. erythrospila

Binomial name
- Mekongina erythrospila Fowler, 1937

Species of fish

Mekongina erythrospila, commonly known as Pa Sa-ee is a cyprinid fish endemic to the Mekong river basin. It grows to 45 cm (18 in) SL.

== Distribution and habitat ==
It occurs in the Mekong river basin between Kratié and Chiang Rai. It lives in flowing water, mainly in rocky areas.

== Utilization ==
It is an important commercial fishery species, as well as food fish for local consumption. In Cambodia, it is the most important fishery species by catch weight.
