= Ptychidio longibarbus =

Scientific classification
- Domain: Eukaryota
- Kingdom: Animalia
- Phylum: Chordata
- Class: Actinopterygii
- Order: Cypriniformes
- Family: Cyprinidae
- Genus: Ptychidio
- Species: P. longibarbus

Binomial name
- Ptychidio longibarbus Chen & Chen, 1989

Species of fish

Ptychidio longibarbus is a species of cyprinid of the genus Ptychidio. It inhabits China, has a maximum length of 16.8 centimetres (6.6 in) and is considered harmless to humans.
