= Ageneiogarra gracilis =

Conservation status
- Data Deficient (IUCN 3.1)

Scientific classification
- Kingdom: Animalia
- Phylum: Chordata
- Class: Actinopterygii
- Order: Cypriniformes
- Family: Cyprinidae
- Genus: Ageneiogarra
- Species: A. gracilis

Binomial name
- Ageneiogarra gracilis (Pellegrin & Chevey, 1936)

Species of fish

Ageneiogarra gracilis is a species of ray-finned fish in the subfamily Labeoninae.
