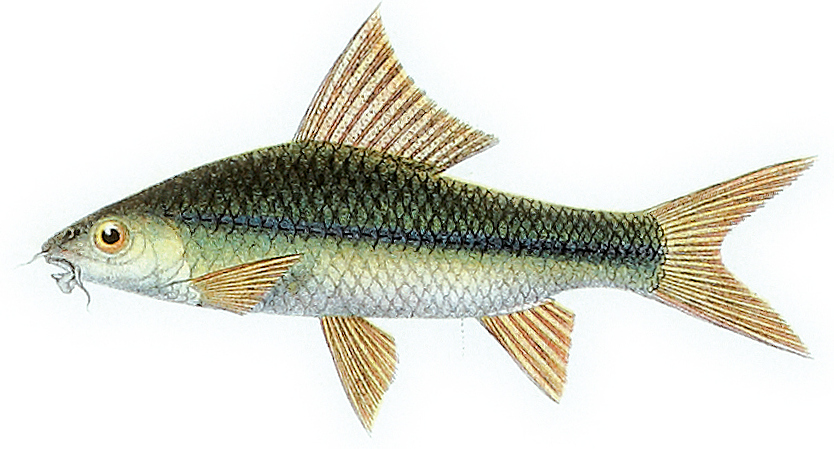

Conservation status
- Data Deficient (IUCN 3.1)

Scientific classification
- Kingdom: Animalia
- Phylum: Chordata
- Class: Actinopterygii
- Order: Cypriniformes
- Family: Cyprinidae
- Genus: Diplocheilichthys
- Species: D. pleurotaenia

Binomial name
- Diplocheilichthys pleurotaenia (Bleeker, 1855)

Synonyms
- Lobocheilos pleurotaenia Bleeker, 1855; Labeo pleurotaenia (Bleeker, 1855); Osteochilus pleurotaenia (Bleeker, 1855); Lobochilus rohitoides Bleeker, 1857; Labeo rohitoides (Bleeker, 1857)

= Diplocheilichthys pleurotaenia =

Species of fish

Diplocheilichthys pleurotaenia is a species of freshwater ray-finned fish belonging to the family Cyprinidae, the carps, barbs, minnows and related fishes. This fish is found in Sumatra and was found on Java, but is thought to be extirpated from Java.
