= Discocheilus =

Scientific classification
- Kingdom: Animalia
- Phylum: Chordata
- Class: Actinopterygii
- Order: Cypriniformes
- Family: Cyprinidae
- Subfamily: Labeoninae
- Genus: Discocheilus; E. Zhang, 1997

Type species
- Discolabeo wui J. X. Chen & J. H. Lan, 1992

Synonyms
- Discolabeo J. X. Chen & J. H. Lan, 1992

Genus of fishes

Discocheilus is a genus of freshwater ray-finned fish belonging to the family Cyprinidae, the carps, barbs, minnows and related fishes. The species which belong to this genus are endemic to China.

== Species ==
Discocheiluscontains the following species:

- Discocheilus multilepis (D. Z. Wang & D. J. Li, 1994)
- Discocheilus wui (J. X. Chen & J. H. Lan, 1992)
- Discocheilus wuluoheensis (W. X. Li, Z. M. Lu & W. L. Mao, 1996)
