= Ptychidio jordani =

Conservation status
- Critically Endangered (IUCN 3.1)

Scientific classification
- Kingdom: Animalia
- Phylum: Chordata
- Class: Actinopterygii
- Order: Cypriniformes
- Family: Cyprinidae
- Subfamily: Labeoninae
- Genus: Ptychidio
- Species: P. jordani

Binomial name
- Ptychidio jordani Myers, 1930

Synonyms
- Varicogobio kaa Lin, 1931

Species of fish

Ptychidio jordani, the ratmouth barbel, is a species of freshwater, ray-finned fish from the carp family, Cyprinidae. It is endemic to the Pearl River drainage system, purported records from Taiwan being considered extremely doubtful. It has been a highly sought species for fisheries but the population has declined to such an extent that it is now rarely caught and the damming of its native streams and rivers is now the chief threat to this species. This species is found in fast flowing, clear, streams and rivers flowing over gravel substrates, spawning in rapids. It is a demersal species which feeds on molluscs and algae. It is now a protected species in Yunnan but this little known species requires further research to determine how best to conserve it. It grows to a maximum size of 33 cm (13 in). The specific name jordani was applied by George S. Myers in honor of ichthyologist David Starr Jordan in appreciation of his friendship and kindness to Myers.
