= Ageneiogarra imberba =

Conservation status
- Data Deficient (IUCN 3.1)

Scientific classification
- Kingdom: Animalia
- Phylum: Chordata
- Class: Actinopterygii
- Order: Cypriniformes
- Family: Cyprinidae
- Subfamily: Labeoninae
- Genus: Ageneiogarra
- Species: A. imberba

Binomial name
- Ageneiogarra imberba (Garman, 1912)

Synonyms
- Garra imberba Garman, 1912; Discognathus pingi Tchang, 1929; Garra pingi (Tchang, 1929); Garra alticorpora Chu & Cui, 1987; Garra hainanensis Chen & Zheng, 1983

Species of fish

Ageneiogarra imberba is a species of cyprinid fish in the subfamily Labeoninae from Mekong, Red River, Pearl River, and upper Yangtze basins in China and Southeast Asia, and on Hainan. It can grow to 34.5 cm (13.6 in) standard length.
