= Placocheilus robustus =

Conservation status
- Data Deficient (IUCN 3.1)

Scientific classification
- Kingdom: Animalia
- Phylum: Chordata
- Class: Actinopterygii
- Order: Cypriniformes
- Family: Cyprinidae
- Genus: Placocheilus
- Species: P. robustus

Binomial name
- Placocheilus robustus E. Zhang, S. P. He & Yi-Yu Chen, 2002

Synonyms
- Garra robustus (E. Zhang, S. P. He & Yi-Yu Chen, 2002)

Species of fish

Placocheilus robustus is a species of cyprinid endemic to the Yuanjiang River basin in Yunnan, China. This species can reach a length of 10.9 centimetres (4.3 in) SL.
