= Diplocheilichthys jentinkii =

Conservation status
- Least Concern (IUCN 3.1)

Scientific classification
- Kingdom: Animalia
- Phylum: Chordata
- Class: Actinopterygii
- Order: Cypriniformes
- Family: Cyprinidae
- Genus: Diplocheilichthys
- Species: D. jentinkii

Binomial name
- Diplocheilichthys jentinkii (Popta, 1904)

Synonyms
- Osteochilus jentinkii Popta, 1904

Species of fish

Diplocheilichthys jentinkii is a species of freshwater ray-finned fish belonging to the family Cyprinidae, the carps, barbs, minnows and related fishes. This species was first formally described in 1904 as Osteochilus jentinkii by the Dutch ichthyologist Canna Maria Louise Popta with its type locality given as the Bongon River in the Mahakam River basin in eastern Borneo. The specific name honours the Dutch zoologist Fredericus Anna Jentink who was the curator of the Rijksmuseum van Natuurlijke Historie, Leiden, and edited the journal in which Popta published her description. This fish is endemism to Borneo where it occurs in the upper reaches of rivers in the Kapuas River basin in West Kalimantan, Indonesia, and in Sarawak, East Malaysia.
