= Discocheilus multilepis =

Conservation status
- Critically Endangered (IUCN 3.1)

Scientific classification
- Kingdom: Animalia
- Phylum: Chordata
- Class: Actinopterygii
- Order: Cypriniformes
- Family: Cyprinidae
- Genus: Discocheilus
- Species: D. multilepis

Binomial name
- Discocheilus multilepis (D. Z. Wang & D. J. Li, 1994)

Synonyms
- Discolabeo multilepis Wang & Li, 1994

Species of fish

Discocheilus multilepis, the oil fish, is a species of freshwater ray-finned fish belonging to the family Cyprinidae, the carps, barbs, minnows and related fishes. This fish is endemic to the Duliujiang River, with all of the specimens collected in Congjiang County in Guizhou Province. Threre have been no records of this species since it was described.
