= Sinocrossocheilus guizhouensis =

Conservation status
- Least Concern (IUCN 3.1)

Scientific classification
- Kingdom: Animalia
- Phylum: Chordata
- Class: Actinopterygii
- Order: Cypriniformes
- Family: Cyprinidae
- Genus: Sinocrossocheilus
- Species: S. guizhouensis

Binomial name
- Sinocrossocheilus guizhouensis H. W. Wu, 1977

Species of fish

Sinocrossocheilus guizhouensis is a species of cyprinid of the genus Sinocrossocheilus. Unsexed males have a maximum length of 7.9 centimetres (3.1 in). It is considered harmless to humans and has been evaluated on the IUCN Red List as "Least Concern".
