= Parapsilorhynchus prateri =

Deolali minnow

Conservation status
- Critically endangered, possibly extinct (IUCN 3.1)

Scientific classification
- Kingdom: Animalia
- Phylum: Chordata
- Class: Actinopterygii
- Order: Cypriniformes
- Family: Cyprinidae
- Genus: Parapsilorhynchus
- Species: P. prateri

Binomial name
- Parapsilorhynchus prateri (Hora & Misra, 1938)

Species of fish

Parapsilorhynchus prateri, the Deolali minnow, is a critically endangered species of cyprinid fish currently only known from the Darna River near Deolali in Nashik District, Maharashtra, India. It is possibly extinct as it has not been recorded since 2004. Recently Nandur Madhameshwar declared a new Ramsar site in Maharashtra which provide sanctuary to the Deolali minnow.
