= Schismatorhynchos endecarhapis =

Conservation status
- Least Concern (IUCN 3.1)

Scientific classification
- Kingdom: Animalia
- Phylum: Chordata
- Class: Actinopterygii
- Order: Cypriniformes
- Family: Cyprinidae
- Genus: Schismatorhynchos
- Species: S. endecarhapis

Binomial name
- Schismatorhynchos endecarhapis Siebert & Tjakrawidjaja, 1998

Species of fish

Schismatorhynchos endecarhapis is a species of freshwater ray-finned fish belonging to the family Cyprinidae, the family which includes the carps, barbs. minnows and related fishes. This species is endemic to central Borneo where it occurs in the upper parts of the drainage basins of the Kapuas River and the Barito River in Kalimantan. It occurs in rivers with fast currents where the riverbed has gravel, stones or rocks.
