= Hongshuia microstomata =

Scientific classification
- Domain: Eukaryota
- Kingdom: Animalia
- Phylum: Chordata
- Class: Actinopterygii
- Order: Cypriniformes
- Family: Cyprinidae
- Subfamily: Labeoninae
- Genus: Hongshuia
- Species: H. microstomata

Binomial name
- Hongshuia microstomata (Wang & Chen, 1989)

Synonyms
- Hongshuia microstomatus; Sinocrossocheilus microstomatus

Species of fish

Hongshuia microstomata is a species of cyprinid fish in the genus Hongshuia endemic to China.
