= Ptychidio macrops =

Conservation status
- Data Deficient (IUCN 3.1)

Scientific classification
- Kingdom: Animalia
- Phylum: Chordata
- Class: Actinopterygii
- Order: Cypriniformes
- Family: Cyprinidae
- Genus: Ptychidio
- Species: P. macrops

Binomial name
- Ptychidio macrops Fang, 1981

Species of fish

Ptychidio macrops, the bigeye ratmouthed barbel, is a species of cyprinid of the genus Ptychidio. It inhabits China, has a maximum length of 20.1 centimetres (7.9 in) and is considered harmless to humans.
