= Sinilabeo hummeli =

Conservation status
- Vulnerable (IUCN 3.1)

Scientific classification
- Kingdom: Animalia
- Phylum: Chordata
- Class: Actinopterygii
- Order: Cypriniformes
- Family: Cyprinidae
- Genus: Sinilabeo
- Species: S. hummeli

Binomial name
- Sinilabeo hummeli E. Zhang, S. O. Kullander & Yi-Yu Chen, 2006

Species of fish

Sinilabeo hummeli is a species of cyprinid of the genus Sinilabeo. It inhabits the upper Yangtze in China. The maximum length for an unsexed male is 19.5 centimetres (7.7 in) and it is considered harmless to humans. It has not been evaluated on the IUCN Red List.
