= Pseudocrossocheilus bamaensis =

Conservation status
- Least Concern (IUCN 3.1)

Scientific classification
- Kingdom: Animalia
- Phylum: Chordata
- Class: Actinopterygii
- Order: Cypriniformes
- Family: Cyprinidae
- Subfamily: Labeoninae
- Genus: Pseudocrossocheilus
- Species: P. bamaensis

Binomial name
- Pseudocrossocheilus bamaensis (P. S. Fang, 1981)

Synonyms
- Crossocheilus bamaensis P. S. Fang, 1981; Sinocrossocheilus bamaensis (P. S. Fang, 1981)

Species of fish

Pseudocrossocheilus bamaensis is a species of freshwater ray-finned fish belonging to the family Cyprinidae, the family which includes the carps, barbs, minnows and related fishes. This fish is endemic to China where it occurs in the Hongshui River, as well as its tributary the Beipanjiang River, in Guangxi and Guizhou. Here it is found in crevices and caves in rocks emerging in the morinings and evenings to feed in the Spring and Summer, remaining in its rock shleters during the winter. This fish has a maximum published total length of 21.5 cm (8.5 in)>
