= B. laevis =

B. laevis may refer to:

- Balanus laevis, a barnacle species in the genus Balanus
- Barbichthys laevis, the sucker barb, a ray-finned fish species
- Bidens laevis, the bur-marigold or smooth beggartick, a flowering plant species native to the southern half of the United States

== See also ==
- List of Latin and Greek words commonly used in systematic names#L
