= Guigarra =

Scientific classification
- Kingdom: Animalia
- Phylum: Chordata
- Class: Actinopterygii
- Order: Cypriniformes
- Family: Cyprinidae
- Subfamily: Labeoninae
- Genus: Guigarra; Z.-B. Wang, X.-Y. Chen & L.-P. Zheng, 2022
- Species: G. cailaoensis

Binomial name
- Guigarra cailaoensis Z.-B. Wang, X.-Y. Chen & Zheng, 2022

Genus of fish

Guigarra is a monotypic genus of freshwater fish from China, closely related to Garra.

Its only species is Guigarra cailaoensis which is found in the Cailao River, Fengshan County, Guangxi Zhuang Autonomous Region, China. The main feature of this species is that the lower lip is specialized into a suction cup structure, and it also has a well-developed upper lip.
