= Sinigarra =

Scientific classification
- Kingdom: Animalia
- Phylum: Chordata
- Class: Actinopterygii
- Order: Cypriniformes
- Family: Cyprinidae
- Subfamily: Labeoninae
- Genus: Sinigarra; E. Zhang & W. Zhou, 2012
- Species: S. napoense

Binomial name
- Sinigarra napoense E. Zhang & W. Zhou, 2012

Monotypic genus of fish

Sinigarra is a monospecific genus of freshwater ray-finned fish belonging to the family Cyprinidae, the family which also includes the carps, barbs, minnows and related fishes. The only species in the genus is Sinigarra napoense a species which is endemic to the Pearl River drainage in China.
