= Stenorynchoacrum =

Scientific classification
- Kingdom: Animalia
- Phylum: Chordata
- Class: Actinopterygii
- Division: Teleostei
- Order: Cypriniformes
- Family: Cyprinidae
- Subfamily: Labeoninae
- Genus: Stenorynchoacrum; Y. F. Huang, J. X. Yang & X. Y. Chen, 2014
- Species: S. xijiangensis

Binomial name
- Stenorynchoacrum xijiangensis Y. F. Huang, J. X. Yang & X. Y. Chen, 2014

Species of fish

Stenorynchoacrum is a monospecific genus of freshwater ray-finned fish belonging to the family Cyprinidae, the family which also includes the carps, barbs, minnows and related fishes. The only species in the genus is Stenorynchoacrum xijiangensis a species endemic to China. It is only known from Guangxi Province where it occurs in a tributary of the Zhujiang River.
