= Fivepearlus =

Scientific classification
- Kingdom: Animalia
- Phylum: Chordata
- Class: Actinopterygii
- Order: Cypriniformes
- Family: Cyprinidae
- Subfamily: Labeoninae
- Genus: Fivepearlus; C. Q. Li, H. F. Yang, W. X. Li & H. Y. Chen, 2017
- Species: F. yunnanensis

Binomial name
- Fivepearlus yunnanensis C. Q. Li, H. F, Yang, W.X. Li & H. Y. Chen, 2017

Genus of fish

Fivepearlus is a monospecific genus of freshwater ray-finned fish belonging to the family Cyprinidae, the family which includes the carps, barbs, minnows and related fishes. The only species in the genus is Fivepearlus yunnanensis which is endemic to China.

== Taxonomy ==
Fivepearlus was first proposed as a monospecific genus in 2017 by Li Chunqing, Yang Hongfu, Li Weixan and Chen Hongyu when they described its only species Fivepearlus yunnanensis. The type locality of F. yunnanensis was given as the River Nanpanjiang in Qiubei County of Yunnan. This taxon is classified in the subfamily Labeoninae in the family Cyprinidae, within the order Cypriniformes.

== Etymology ==
Fivepearlus is a latinisation of the English words "five" and "pearl", a reference to the bead-like protuberances on the lower lip resembling a "string of beads". The specific name yunnanensis, refers to the type locality in Yunnan.

== Description ==
Fivepearlus is distinguished from the other taxa in the subfamily Labeoninae by the possession of five round protuberances along its lower lip, these resemble a string of beads. It also has a body which is covered in scales and 5 branched fin rays in the caudal fin. Other features include the dorsal fin being supported by 2 spines and 7 soft rays while the anal fin has 2 spines and 5 soft rays. The holotype had a total length of 63 mm (2.5 in).

== Distribution ==
Fivepearlus is known from its type locality, the Qingshuijiang bridge on the Nanpangjiang River in Qiubei county, Yunnan. The type specimens were retained in Heilongtan Reservoir of Shilin.
