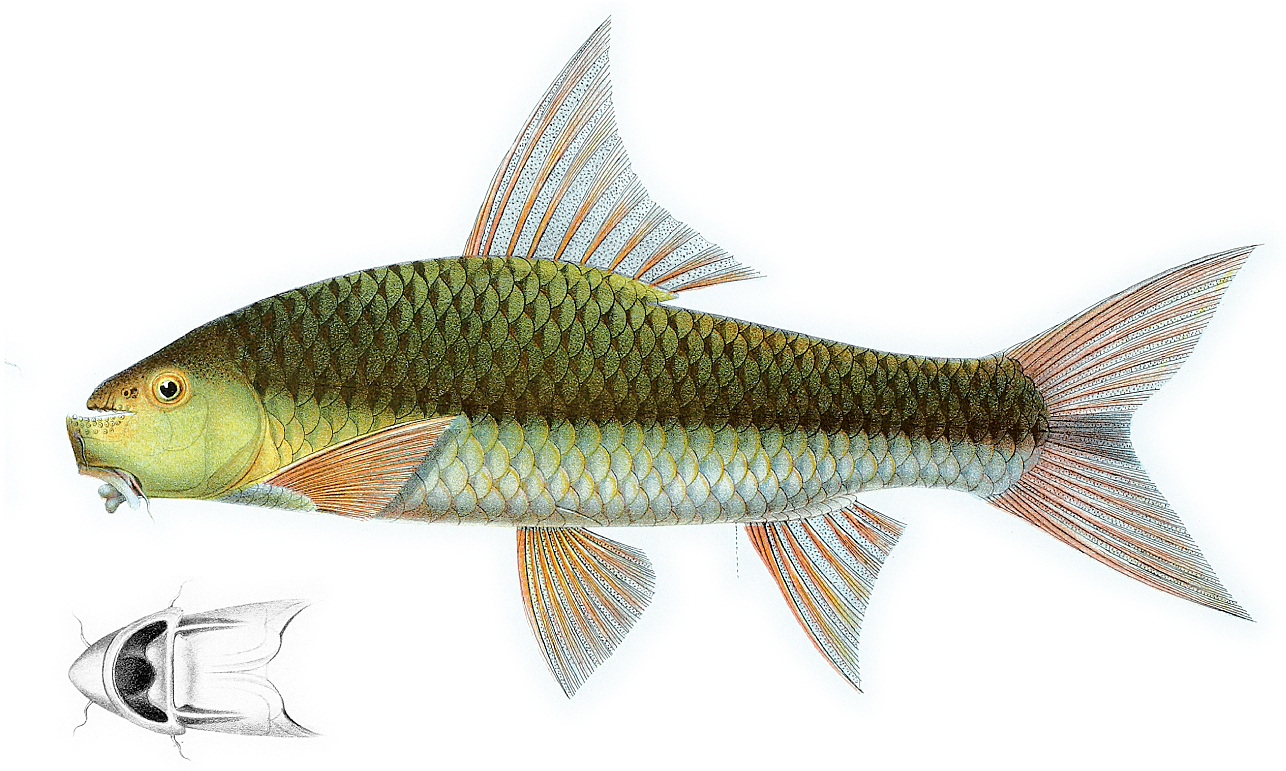
- Schismatorhynchos heterorhynchos

Scientific classification
- Kingdom: Animalia
- Phylum: Chordata
- Class: Actinopterygii
- Order: Cypriniformes
- Suborder: Cyprinoidei
- Family: Cyprinidae
- Subfamily: Labeoninae
- Genus: Schismatorhynchos; Bleeker, 1855

Type species
- Lobocheilus heterorhynchos Bleeker, 1853

= Schismatorhynchos =

Genus of fishes

Schismatorhynchos is a genus of freshwater ray-finned fishes eblonging to the family Cyprinidae, the family which includes the carps, barbs, minnows and related fishes. The fishes in this genus are found on Sumatra and Borneo in Indonesia and East Malaysia.

== Species ==
Schismatorhynchos contains the following species:

- Schismatorhynchos endecarhapis Siebert & Tjakrawidjaja, 1998
- Schismatorhynchos heterorhynchos (Bleeker, 1854)
- Schismatorhynchos holorhynchos Siebert & Tjakrawidjaja, 1998
