= Pseudoplacocheilus =

Conservation status
- Least Concern (IUCN 3.1)

Scientific classification
- Kingdom: Animalia
- Phylum: Chordata
- Class: Actinopterygii
- Order: Cypriniformes
- Family: Cyprinidae
- Subfamily: Labeoninae
- Genus: Pseudoplacocheilus; X. Li, W. Zhou, C. Sun, X. Yun
- Species: P. cryptonemus

Binomial name
- Pseudoplacocheilus cryptonemus (G. H. Cui & Z. Y. Li, 1984)

Synonyms
- Placocheilus cryptonemus Cui & Li, 1984; Garra cryptonema (Cui & Li, 1984)

Species of fish

Pseudoplacocheilus is a monospecific genus of freshwater ray-finned fish belonging to the family Cyprinidae, the family which includes the carps, barbs. minnows and related species, with the only described species in the genus being Pseudoplacocheilus cryptonemus which is endemic to Yunnan where it occurs in the upper Salween River and the upper Mekong River basins. It is found in clear waters and uses crevices in rocks to hide in.
