= Semilabeo =

Scientific classification
- Kingdom: Animalia
- Phylum: Chordata
- Class: Actinopterygii
- Order: Cypriniformes
- Family: Cyprinidae
- Subfamily: Labeoninae
- Genus: Semilabeo; W. K. H. Peters, 1881

Type species
- Semilabeo notabilis Peters, 1881

Synonyms
- Amplolabrius S. Y. Lin, 1933

Genus of fishes

Semilabeo is a genus of freshwater ray-finned fish belonging to the family Cyprinidae, the family which includes the carps, barbs. minnows and related fishes. The fishes in this genus are found in southern China and Viet Nam.

== Species ==
Semilabeo contains the following valid species:

- Semilabeo notabilis W. K. H. Peters, 1881
- Semilabeo obscurus R. D. Lin, 1981
