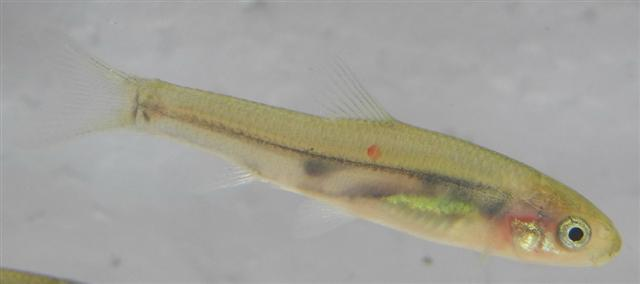

Scientific classification
- Kingdom: Animalia
- Phylum: Chordata
- Class: Actinopterygii
- Order: Cypriniformes
- Family: Cyprinidae
- Subfamily: Labeoninae
- Genus: Linichthys; E. Zhang & F. Fang, 2005
- Species: L. laticeps

Binomial name
- Linichthys laticeps (R. D. Lin & C. G. Zhang, 1986)

Synonyms
- Barbodes laticeps Lin & Zhang, 1986

= Linichthys =

Monotypic genusof fish

Linichthys is a monospecific genus of freshwater ray-finned fish be;onging to the family Cyprinidae, the family which includes the carps, barbs, minnows and related fishes. The only species in the genus is Linichthys lateiceps, a species found only in the upper and middle Pearl River basin and the upper Yangtze basin in the city of Guiyang in Guizhou Province in Southern China This species reaches a length of 11.0 cm (4.3 in).

== Etymology ==
The genus is named after Lin Ren-Duan. A Chinese ichthyologist.
