= Pseudogyrinocheilus =

Conservation status
- Least Concern (IUCN 3.1)

Scientific classification
- Kingdom: Animalia
- Phylum: Chordata
- Class: Actinopterygii
- Order: Cypriniformes
- Family: Cyprinidae
- Subfamily: Labeoninae
- Genus: Pseudogyrinocheilus; P. W. Fang, 1933
- Species: P. prochilus

Binomial name
- Pseudogyrinocheilus prochilus (Sauvage & Dabry de Thiersant, 1874)

Synonyms
- Discognathus prochilus Sauvage & Dabry de Thiersant, 1874; Semilabeo prochilus (Sauvage & Dabry de Thiersant, 1874); Gyrinocheilus roulei T. L. Tchang, 1929; Gyrinocheilus pellegrini T. L. Tchang, 1929

Monotypic genus of fish

Pseudogyrinocheilus is a monospecific genus of freshwater ray-finned fish belonging to the family Cyprinidae, the family which also includes the carps, barbs, minnows and related fishes. The ony species in the genus is Pseudogyrinocheilus prochilus which is found in the Yangtze River and its tributaries in China.
