= Garroides =

Scientific classification
- Kingdom: Animalia
- Phylum: Chordata
- Class: Actinopterygii
- Order: Cypriniformes
- Family: Cyprinidae
- Subfamily: Labeoninae
- Genus: Garroides; V. H. Nguyễn & T. H. N. Vũ, 2014

Type species
- Garroides binhluensis V. H. Nguyễn & T. H. N. Vũ, 2014

Genus of fishes

Garroides is a genus of freshwater ray-finned fishes belonging to the family Cyprinidae, the family which includes the carps, barbs, minnows and related fishes. The fishes in this genus are endemic to Viet Nam.

== Species ==
Garroides contains two recognised species:

- Garroides banthangensis V. H. Nguyễn & T. H. N. Vũ, 2014
- Garroides binhluensis V. H. Nguyễn & T. H. N. Vũ, 2014
