= Pseudocrossocheilus =

Scientific classification
- Kingdom: Animalia
- Phylum: Chordata
- Class: Actinopterygii
- Order: Cypriniformes
- Family: Cyprinidae
- Subfamily: Labeoninae
- Genus: Pseudocrossocheilus; E. Zhang & J. X. Chen, 1997

Type species
- Crossocheilus bamaensis P. S. Fang, 1981

Genus of fishes

Pseudocrossocheilus is a genus of cyprinid fish endemic to China. There are currently five recognized species in this genus.

== Species ==
Pseudocrossocheilus contains the following species;

- Pseudocrossocheilus bamaensis (P. S. Fang, 1981)
- Pseudocrossocheilus liuchengensis (L. Liang, C. X. Liu & Q. L. Wu, 1987)
- Pseudocrossocheilus longibullus (R. F. Su, J. X. Yang & G. H. Cui, 2003)
- Pseudocrossocheilus nigrovittatus (R. F. Su, J. X. Yang & G. H. Cui, 2003)
- Pseudocrossocheilus papillolabrus (R. F. Su, J. X. Yang & G. H. Cui, 2003)
- Pseudocrossocheilus tridentis (G. H. Cui & X. L. Chu, 1986)
