= Hongshuia =

Scientific classification
- Kingdom: Animalia
- Phylum: Chordata
- Class: Actinopterygii
- Order: Cypriniformes
- Family: Cyprinidae
- Subfamily: Labeoninae
- Genus: Hongshuia; E. Zhang, X. Qiang & J. H. Lan, 2008

Type species
- Hongshuia paoli Zhang, Qiang & Lan 2008

Genus of fishes

Hongshuia is a genus of freshwater ray-finned fishes belonging to the family Cyprinidae, the family which includes the carps, barbs, minnows and related fishes. These fishes are endemic to China.

== Species ==
Hongshuia contains the following species:

- Hongshuia banmo E. Zhang, X. Qiang & J. H. Lan, 2008
- Hongshuia megalophthalmus (X.-Y. Chen, J.-X. Yang & G.-H. Cui, 2006)
- Hongshuia microstomata (D. Z. Wang & Yi-Yu Chen, 1989)
- Hongshuia paoli E. Zhang, X. Qiang & J. H. Lan, 2008
- Hongshuia brevibarba Zeng, Shao, Jin & Zhang, 2022
- Hongshuia wangi Zeng & Zhang, 2026
- Hongshuia boulobos Zeng & Zhang, 2026
