= Vinagarra =

Scientific classification
- Kingdom: Animalia
- Phylum: Chordata
- Class: Actinopterygii
- Division: Teleostei
- Order: Cypriniformes
- Family: Cyprinidae
- Subfamily: Labeoninae
- Genus: Vinagarra; V. H. Nguyễn & T. A. Bùi, 2010

Type species
- Garra laichowensis Nguyen & Doan, 1969

Genus of fishes

Vinagarra is a genus of ray-finned fish in the family Cyprinidae endemic to Vietnam.

== Species ==
There are currently 4 recognized species in this genus:

- Vinagarra elongata V. H. Nguyễn & T. A. Bùi, 2010
- Vinagarra findolabium (F. L. Li, W. Zhou & Q. Fu, 2008)
- Vinagarra laichowensis (V. H. Nguyễn & L. H. Doan, 1969)
- Vinagarra tamduongensis V. H. Nguyễn & T. A. Bùi, 2010
