= Sinilabeo =

Scientific classification
- Kingdom: Animalia
- Phylum: Chordata
- Class: Actinopterygii
- Order: Cypriniformes
- Family: Cyprinidae
- Subfamily: Labeoninae
- Genus: Sinilabeo; Rendahl (de), 1932

Type species
- Sinilabeo hummeli E. Zhang, S. O. Kullander & Yi-Yu Chen

Genus of fishes

Sinilabeo is a genus of freshwater ray-finned fish belonging to the family Cyprinidae, the family which includes the carps, barbs. minnows and related fishes. The fishes in this genus are found in China.

== Species ==
Sinilabeo contains the following species;

- Sinilabeo hummeli E. Zhang, S. O. Kullander & Yi-Yu Chen, 2006
- Sinilabeo longibarbatus J. X. Chen & J. Z. Zheng, 1988
