= Sinocrossocheilus labiatus =

Conservation status
- Least Concern (IUCN 3.1)

Scientific classification
- Kingdom: Animalia
- Phylum: Chordata
- Class: Actinopterygii
- Order: Cypriniformes
- Family: Cyprinidae
- Genus: Sinocrossocheilus
- Species: S. labiatus

Binomial name
- Sinocrossocheilus labiatus R. F. Su, J. X. Yang & G. H. Cui, 2003

Species of fish

Sinocrossocheilus labiatus is a species of cyprinid of the genus Sinocrossocheilus. It inhabits China's Tongzi river, is considered harmless to humans and has been evaluated on the IUCN Red List as "Least Concern".
