= Prolixicheilus =

Scientific classification
- Kingdom: Animalia
- Phylum: Chordata
- Class: Actinopterygii
- Order: Cypriniformes
- Family: Cyprinidae
- Subfamily: Labeoninae
- Genus: Prolixicheilus; L. P. Zheng, X. Y. Chen & J. X. Yang, 2016
- Species: P. longisulcus

Binomial name
- Prolixicheilus longisulcus (L. P. Zheng, X. Y. Chen & J. X. Yang, 2009)

Synonyms
- Pseudogyrinocheilus longisulcus L. P. Zheng, X. Y. Chen & J. X. Yang, 2009

Genus of fishes

Prolixicheilus is a monospecific genus of freshwater ray-finned fish belonging ti the family Cyprinidae, the family which includes the carps, barbs, minnows and related fishes. The only species in the genus is Prolixicheilus longisulcus which is found in streams belonging to the Zuojiang River, a tributary of Pearl River in China.
