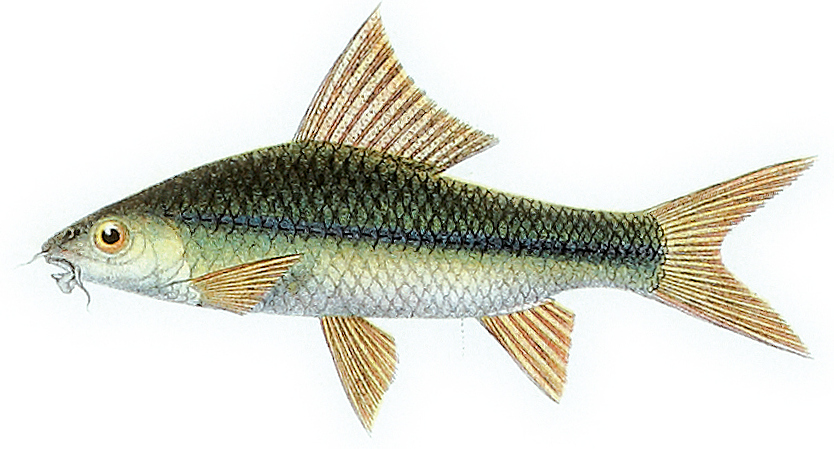
- Diplocheilichthys pleurotaenia

Scientific classification
- Kingdom: Animalia
- Phylum: Chordata
- Class: Actinopterygii
- Order: Cypriniformes
- Family: Cyprinidae
- Subfamily: Labeoninae
- Genus: Diplocheilichthys; Bleeker, 1855

Type species
- Lobocheilos pleurotaenia Bleeker, 1855

= Diplocheilichthys =

Genus of fishes

Diplocheilichthys is a genus of freshwater ray-finned fish belonging to the family Cyprinidae, the carps, barbs, minnows and related fishes. The two species which belong to this genus are found in East Malaysia and Indonesia.

== Species ==
Diplocheilichthys contains the following species:

- Diplocheilichthys jentinkii (Popta, 1904)
- Diplocheilichthys pleurotaenia (Bleeker, 1855)
