= Protolabeo =

Scientific classification
- Kingdom: Animalia
- Phylum: Chordata
- Class: Actinopterygii
- Division: Teleostei
- Order: Cypriniformes
- Family: Cyprinidae
- Subfamily: Labeoninae
- Genus: Protolabeo; C. G. Zhang, Y. H. Zhao, & L. An, 2010
- Species: P. protolabeo

Binomial name
- Protolabeo protolabeo L. An, B. S. Liu, Y. H. Zhao & C. G. Zhang, 2010

Species of fish

Protolabeo is a monospecific genus of freshwater ray-finned fish belonging ti the family Cyprinidae, the family which includes the carps, barbs, minnows and related fishes. The only species in the genus is Protolabeo protolabeo, which is endemic to the Yilihe River in Yunnan, China.
