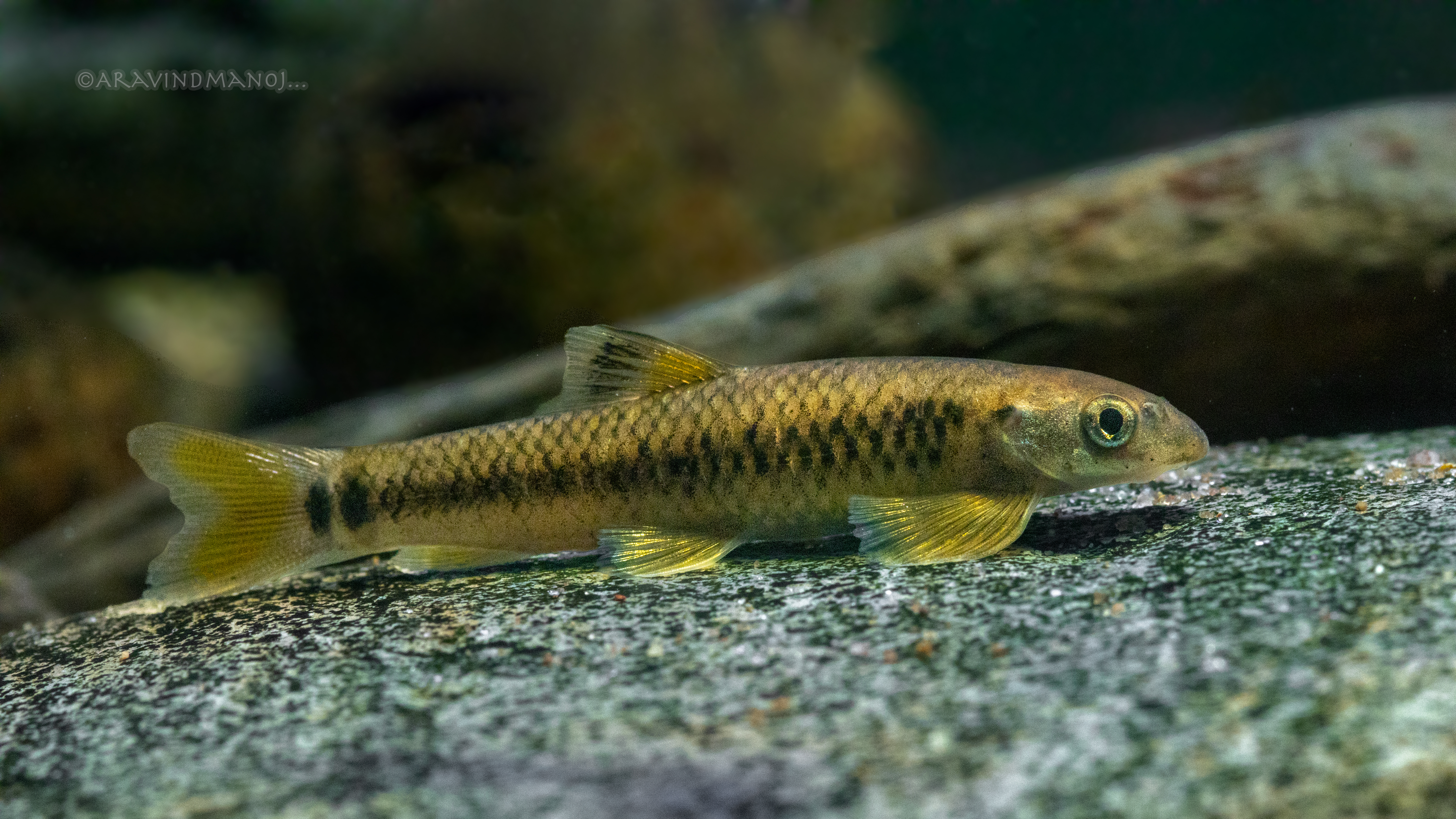
- Parapsilorhynchus alluriensis

Scientific classification
- Domain: Eukaryota
- Kingdom: Animalia
- Phylum: Chordata
- Class: Actinopterygii
- Order: Cypriniformes
- Family: Cyprinidae
- Subfamily: Labeoninae
- Genus: Parapsilorhynchus; Hora, 1921

Type species
- Psilorhynchus tentaculatus Annandale, 1919

= Parapsilorhynchus =

Genus of fishes

Parapsilorhynchus is a genus of cyprinid fishes endemic to India. There are currently four described species in this genus.

== Species ==
Parapsilorhynchus contains the following valid species;

- Parapsilorhynchus alluriensis S. S. Jadhav, M. Karuthapandi, Chandra, Jaiswal, K. P. Dinesh & A. Narahari, 2020
- Parapsilorhynchus discophorus Hora, 1921 (Ratnagiri minnow)
- Parapsilorhynchus elongatus D. F. Singh, 1994
- Parapsilorhynchus odishaensis B. K. Baliarsingh, Kosygin and S. K. Swain, 2017
- Parapsilorhynchus prateri Hora & Misra, 1938 (Deolali minnow)
- Parapsilorhynchus swaini B. K. Baliarsingh & Kosygin, 2017
- Parapsilorhynchus tentaculatus (Annandale, 1919) (Khandalla minnow)
