= Mekongina =

Scientific classification
- Kingdom: Animalia
- Phylum: Chordata
- Class: Actinopterygii
- Order: Cypriniformes
- Family: Cyprinidae
- Subfamily: Labeoninae
- Genus: Mekongina (Fowler, 1937)

Type species
- Mekongina erythrospila Fowler, 1937

Genus of fishes

Mekongina is a genus of freshwater ray-finned fish belonging to the family Cyprinidae, the family which includes the carps, barbs, minnows and related fishes. The fishes in this genus are found in Southeast Asia and China.

== Species ==
These are the currently recognised species in this genus:

- Mekongina bibarba V. H. Nguyễn, 2001
- Mekongina erythrospila Fowler, 1937
- Mekongina lancangensis Jian Yang, X. Y. Chen & J. X. Yang, 2008
