= Qianlabeo =

Scientific classification
- Kingdom: Animalia
- Phylum: Chordata
- Class: Actinopterygii
- Order: Cypriniformes
- Family: Cyprinidae
- Subfamily: Labeoninae
- Genus: Qianlabeo; E. Zhang & Yi-Yu Chen, 2004
- Species: Q. striatus

Binomial name
- Qianlabeo striatus E. Zhang & Yi-Yu Chen, 2004

Monotypic genus of fish

Qianlabeo is a monospecific genus of freshwater ray-finned fish belonging to the family Cyprinidae, the family which also includes the carps, barbs, minnows and related fishes. The ony species in the genus is Qianlabeo striatus which is endemic to the Pearl River drainage, Guizhou, China.
