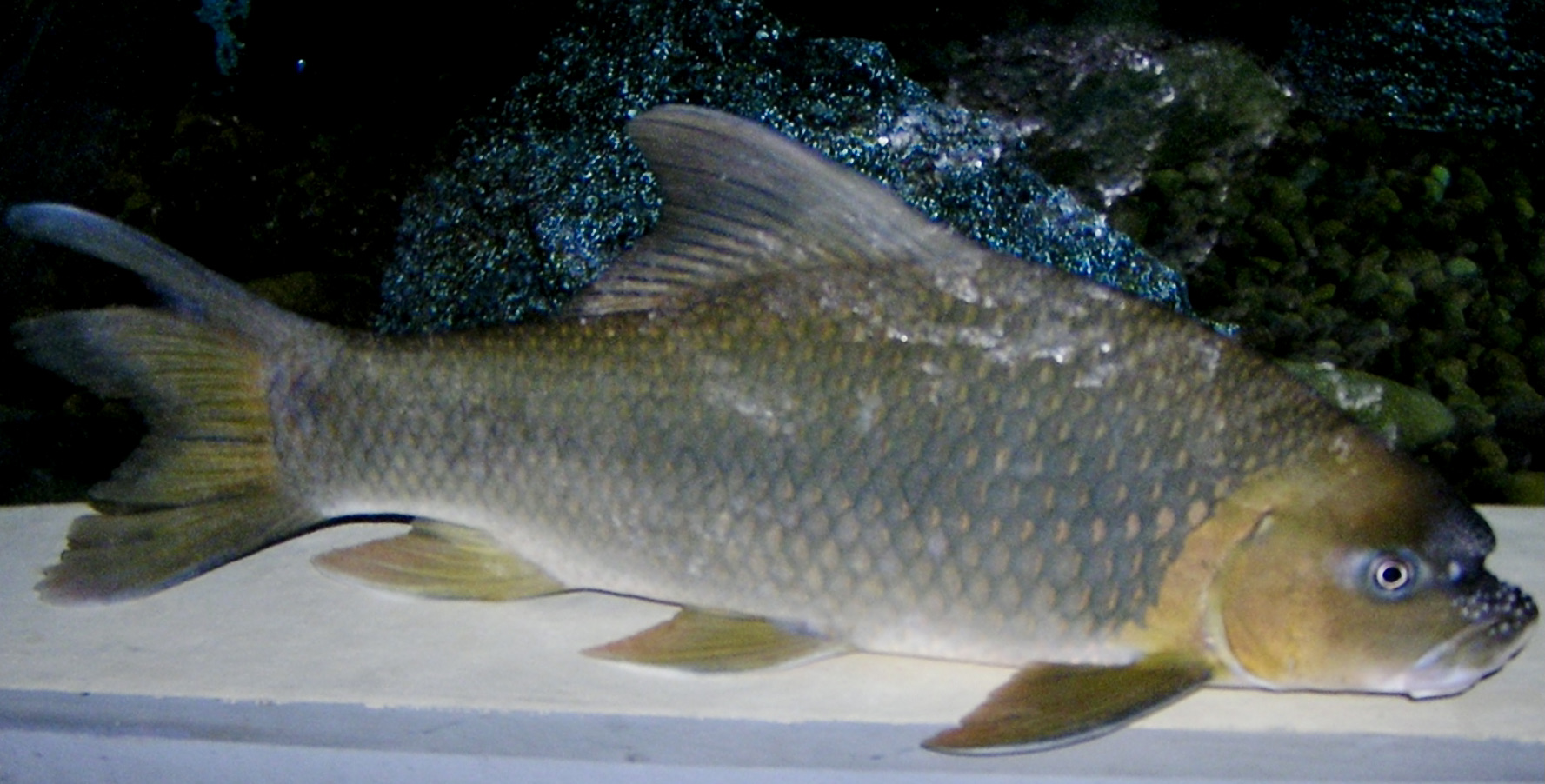
- Male in breeding condition, captive in Siam Ocean World

Conservation status
- Vulnerable (IUCN 3.1)

Scientific classification
- Kingdom: Animalia
- Phylum: Chordata
- Class: Actinopterygii
- Division: Teleostei
- Order: Cypriniformes
- Family: Cyprinidae
- Subfamily: Labeoninae
- Genus: Incisilabeo; Fowler, 1937
- Species: I. behri

Binomial name
- Incisilabeo behri (Fowler, 1937)

Synonyms
- Bangana behri; Labeo behri; Osteochilus tatumi

= Incisilabeo =

Species of fish

Incisilabeo is a monospecific genus of freshwater ray-finned fishes belonging to the family Cyprinidae, the family which includes the carps, barbs, minnows and related fishes. The only species in the genus is Incisilabeo behri.

Males develop a distinctive nuchal hump with pearl organs during the breeding season. This sexual ornament is uniquely divided in two by a notch at the level of the eyes, from which the generic name Incisilabeo is derived: incisum "notch" plus Labeo.

The specific name honours Otto Behr (1861–1934), an amateur naturalist and ornithologist from Lopez, Pennsylvania who provided wildlife specimens from Thailand that Fowler worked on during his employment at the Academy of Natural Sciences of Philadelphia.

The fish found in the Mae Klong River has a considerably larger body size than those found in the Mekong River. Its caudal fin and the edge of the dorsal fin appear to form a straight line across the middle, without a deeply concave indentation. It may represent a new species, but it has not yet been studied, and there is currently no additional information available other than two photographs: one taken by an angler at Srinakarin Dam in Kanchanaburi Province, and another from the upper reaches of the Mae Klong River in Umphang, Tak Province.
