= Ageneiogarra =

Scientific classification
- Kingdom: Animalia
- Phylum: Chordata
- Class: Actinopterygii
- Order: Cypriniformes
- Family: Cyprinidae
- Subfamily: Labeoninae
- Genus: Ageneiogarra; Garman, 1912

Type species
- Garra imberba Garman, 1912

Genus of fishes

Ageneiogarra is a genus of freshwater ray-finned fishes belonging to the family Cyprinidae, which includes the carps, barbs and related fishes. The fishes in this genus are found in southeastern and eastern Asia.

== Species ==
Ageneiogarra contains the following valid species:

- Ageneiogarra apogon (Norman, 1925)
- Ageneiogarra gracilis (Pellegrin & Chevey 1936)
- Ageneiogarra imberba (Garman, 1912)
- Ageneiogarra kleini Endruweit 2025
- Ageneiogarra nujiangensis (Z. M. Chen & J. X. Yang, 2009)
- Ageneiogarra theunensis (Kottelat, 1998)
