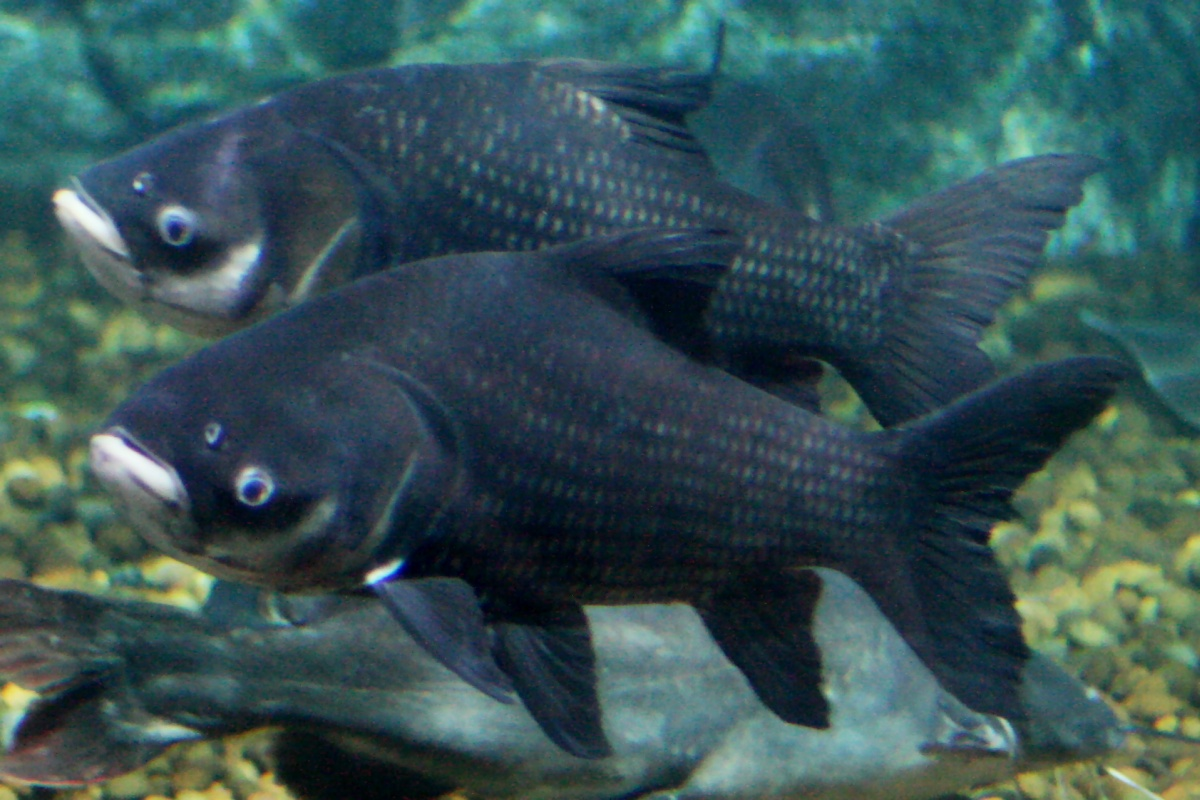

Conservation status
- Critically Endangered (IUCN 3.1)

Scientific classification
- Kingdom: Animalia
- Phylum: Chordata
- Class: Actinopterygii
- Order: Cypriniformes
- Family: Cyprinidae
- Subfamily: Probarbinae
- Genus: Catlocarpio; Boulenger, 1898
- Species: C. siamensis

Binomial name
- Catlocarpio siamensis Boulenger, 1898

= Giant barb =

Giant barb/Siamese giant carp

Species of fish

The giant barb, Siamese giant carp, or simply Siamese carp (Catlocarpio siamensis; Khmer: ត្រីគល់រាំង, trei kól reăng; Thai: กระโห้, RTGS: kraho, Thai pronunciation: [krā.hôː], or กะมัน, RTGS: kaman, Thai pronunciation: [kā.mān]; Vietnamese: cá Hô) is the largest species of cyprinid, and may also be the largest member in the suborder Cyprinoidei. These migratory fish are found only in the Mae Klong, Mekong, and Chao Phraya River basins in Indochina. Populations have declined drastically due to habitat loss and overfishing, and the giant barb is now considered critically endangered.

== Distribution and habitat ==
Giant barbs are usually seen in large pools along the edges of large rivers, but seasonally enter smaller canals, floodplains, and flooded forests. Young barbs are usually found in smaller tributaries and swamps, but can acclimate to living in ponds, canals, and swamps. The fish generally live in pairs.

These are migratory fish, swimming to favorable areas for feeding and breeding in different parts of the year. These slow-moving fish subsist on algae, phytoplankton, and fruits of inundated terrestrial plants, rarely (if ever) feeding on active animals. In the lower Mekong basin, young giant barbs have been reported as occurring primarily in October.

== Physical characteristics ==
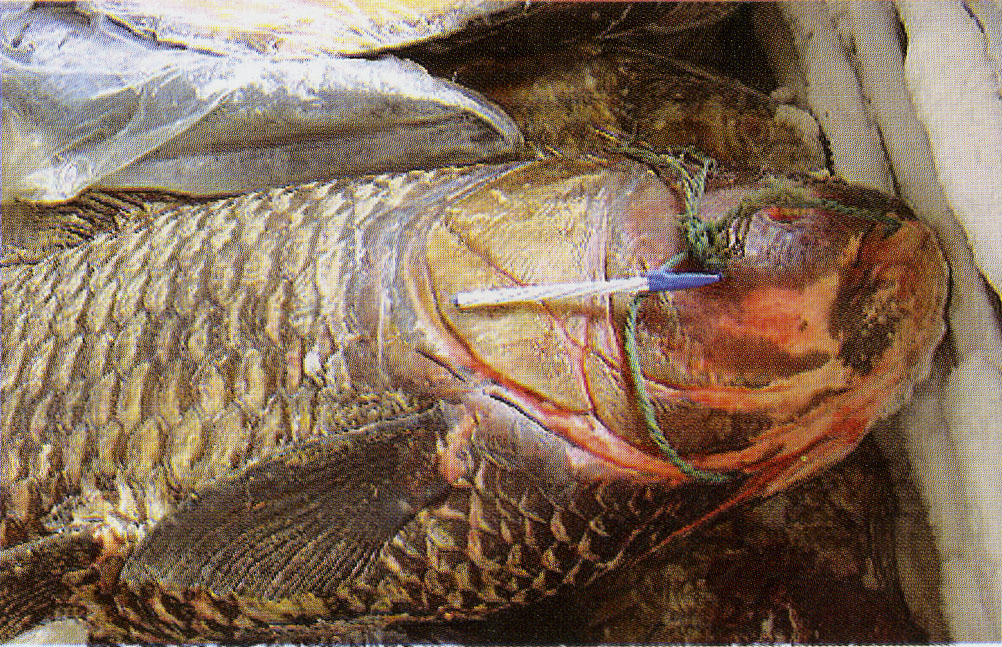
Barb captured in a fishing boat

The head is rather large for the body, with no barbels.

The giant barb ranks among the largest freshwater fish in the world, and is probably the largest fish in the family Cyprinidae. It may reach 3 m (9.8 ft) (although this claimed maximum length needs confirmation) and weigh up to 300 kg (660 lb). Among the cyprinids, only the golden mahseer can reach a comparable length, but it is a relatively slender fish that weighs far less. Few large giant barbs are caught today. For example, no individual weighing more than 150 kg (330 lb) has been caught in Cambodia since 1994. Today, the maximum length is about 1.8 m (6 ft). The current record weight is 105 kg for an individual caught in Thailand in 2019 breaking the previous record by 5 kg.

This fish is a tetraploid, meaning it has four of each chromosome (as opposed to diploid, the normal number in animals).

== Conservation ==
Today, few barbs live to maturity. The main threats are habitat loss (e.g., pollution and dams) and overfishing. The sharp population decline is well illustrated by catch data from Cambodia, where 200 tonnes of giant barbs were caught in 1964. By 1980, only about 50 fish were caught, and by 2000, only 10. It was formerly an important fish in local catches below the Khone Phapheng Falls, but surveys between 1993 and 1999 only located a single small individual. Consequently, the giant barb is listed as Critically Endangered on the IUCN Red List. It has been entirely extirpated from the Chao Phraya River.

In a 2005 royal decree, the Kingdom of Cambodia designated this fauna as the national fish to bring conservation awareness to this species.

In 2005, the giant barb was successfully domesticated and reproduced for the first time at the Vietnam National Breeding Center for Southern Freshwater Aquaculture.

In 2010, the Vietnam National Breeding Center released 50,000 young giant barbs into the Tien River in Dong Thap province Vietnam, but a later survey showed that only a few of them survived long enough to reach a weight of over one kilogram.

In 2012, it was successfully reproduced in the Breeding Center of An Giang Province of Vietnam.

== Cultivation ==
In recent years, raising giant barb has become common in Vietnam due to its high economic value. Two breeding centers in southern Vietnam offer about 1 million breeder giant barbs to farmers per year. When kept in floating cages in rivers, the fish grow fast and gain 7 kg to 9 kg per year. In ponds where the main diet is natural algae, the fish gain 2 to 5 kg per year. Usually, giant barbs are harvested after three years of cultivation when they weigh 6 to 10 kg, but some farmers keep raising their fish in ponds for more than seven years for them to reach 50 kg before harvesting.
