= Longanalus =

Scientific classification
- Kingdom: Animalia
- Phylum: Chordata
- Class: Actinopterygii
- Order: Cypriniformes
- Family: Cyprinidae
- Subfamily: Labeoninae
- Genus: Longanalus; W. X. Li, J. C. Ran & Hui Ming Chen, 2006
- Species: L. macrochirous

Binomial name
- Longanalus macrochirous W. X. Li, J. C. Ran & Hui Ming Chen, 2006

Monotypic genus of fish

Longanalus is a monospecific genus of freshwater ray-finned fish belonging to the family Cyprinidae, the family which includes the carps, barbs, minnows and related fishes. The only species on the genus is Longanalus macrochirous, a species of cave-dwelling fish endemic to the Maolan National Reserve in Guizhou, China.
