= Ptychidio =

Scientific classification
- Kingdom: Animalia
- Phylum: Chordata
- Class: Actinopterygii
- Order: Cypriniformes
- Family: Cyprinidae
- Subfamily: Labeoninae
- Genus: Ptychidio; G. S. Myers, 1930

Type species
- Ptychidio jordani Myers, 1930

Synonyms
- Varicogobio Lin, 1931

Genus of fishes

Ptychidio is a genus of cyprinid fish endemic to China.

== Species ==
There are currently three recognized species in this genus:

- Ptychidio jordani G. S. Myers, 1930
- Ptychidio longibarbus Yi-Yu Chen & Y. F. Chen, 1989
- Ptychidio macrops S. M. Fang, 1981
