= Paraqianlabeo =

Scientific classification
- Kingdom: Animalia
- Phylum: Chordata
- Class: Actinopterygii
- Order: Cypriniformes
- Family: Cyprinidae
- Subfamily: Labeoninae
- Genus: Paraqianlabeo; H. T. Zhao, J. P. Sullivan, Y. G. Zhang & Z. G. Peng, 2014
- Species: P. lineatus

Binomial name
- Paraqianlabeo lineatus H. T. Zhao, J. P. Sullivan, Y. G. Zhang & Z. G. Peng, 2014

Species of fish

Paraqianlabeo is a monospecific genus of freshwater ray-finned fish belonging to the family Cyprinidae, the family which includes the carps, barbs, minnows and related fishes. The only species in the genus is Paraqianlabeo lineatus which is found in Yangtze river basin in Guizhou Province, South China.
