= Placocheilus =

Scientific classification
- Kingdom: Animalia
- Phylum: Chordata
- Class: Actinopterygii
- Order: Cypriniformes
- Family: Cyprinidae
- Subfamily: Labeoninae
- Genus: Placocheilus; H. W. Wu, 1977

Type species
- Discognathus caudofasciatus Pellegrin & Chevey, 1936

Genus of fishes

Placocheilus is a genus of fish in the family Cyprinidae native to eastern Asia.

== Species ==
These are the currently recognized species in this genus:

- Placocheilus bibarbatus V. H. Nguyễn, 2001
- Placocheilus caudofasciatus (Pellegrin & Chevey, 1936)
- Placocheilus imbarbatus V. H. Nguyễn, 2002
- Placocheilus robustus Zhang, He & Chen, 2002
