= Semilabeo obscurus =

Conservation status
- Least Concern (IUCN 3.1)

Scientific classification
- Kingdom: Animalia
- Phylum: Chordata
- Class: Actinopterygii
- Order: Cypriniformes
- Family: Cyprinidae
- Genus: Semilabeo
- Species: S. obscurus

Binomial name
- Semilabeo obscurus Lin, 1981

Species of fish

Semilabeo obscurus is a species of freshwater ray-finned fish belonging to the family Cyprinidae, the family which includes the carps, barbs. minnows and related fishes. This species is found in the Xijiang River system in Guangxi to Yunnan in southwestern China, it has also been reported from the River Gam in Viet Nam.
