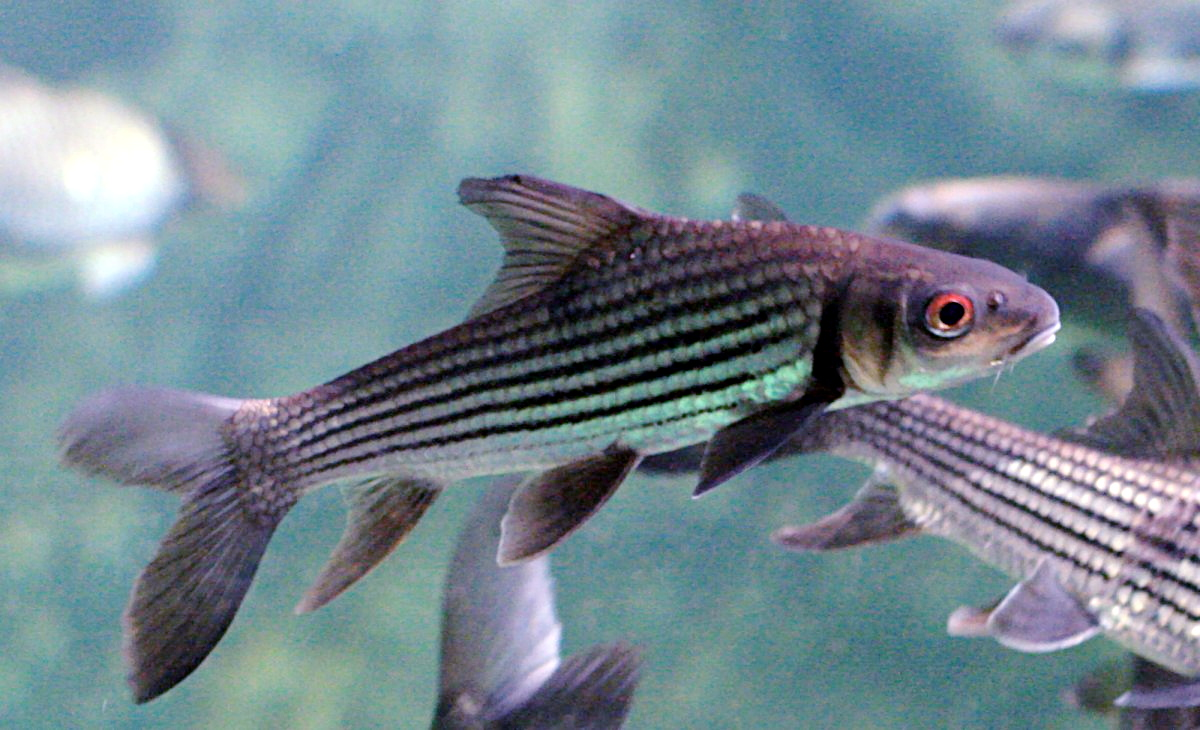
- Jullien's golden carp (Probarbus jullieni)
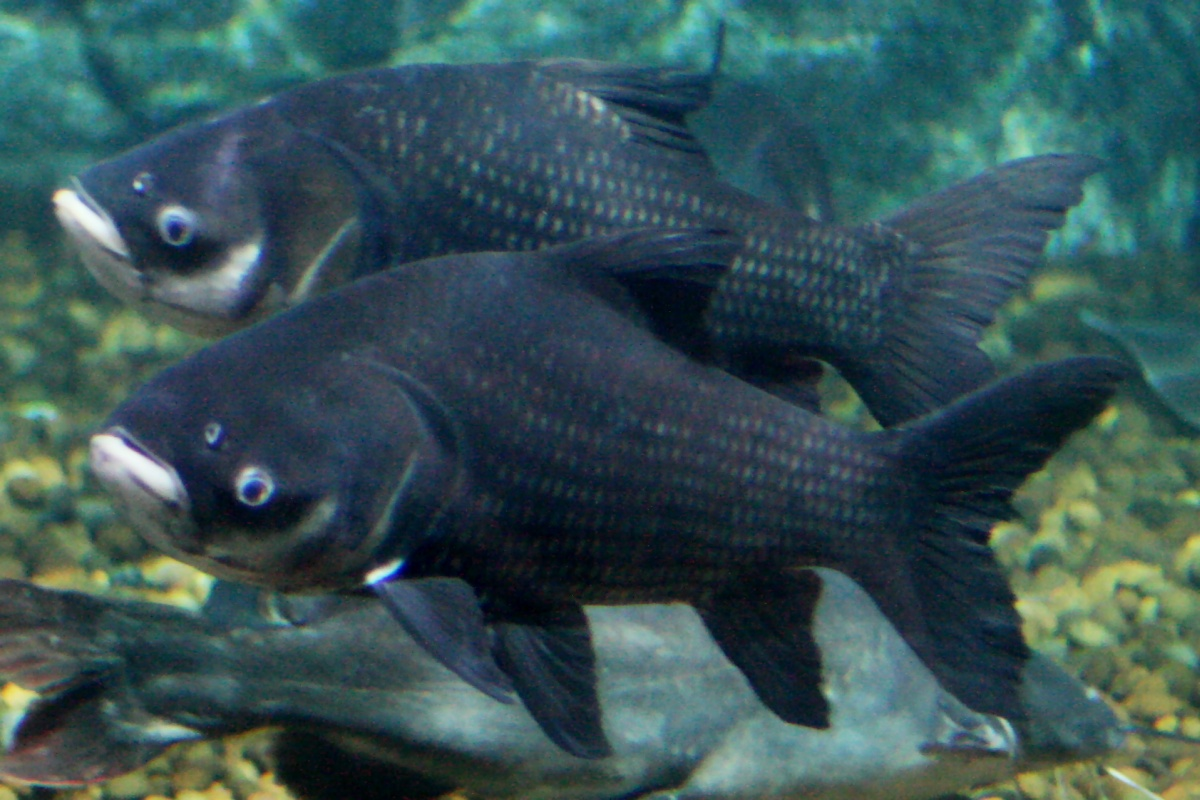
- Giant barb (Catlocarpio siamensis)

Scientific classification
- Kingdom: Animalia
- Phylum: Chordata
- Class: Actinopterygii
- Order: Cypriniformes
- Family: Cyprinidae
- Subfamily: Probarbinae; Yang et al, 2015

= Probarbinae =

Subfamily of fishes

Probarbinae is a subfamily of freshwater ray-finned fishes belonging to the family Cyprinidae, which includes the carps, barbs and related fishes. The fishes in this subfamily are found in tropical Asia. Fish of the two genera reach large sizes, with all species recorded to exceed 1 metre (3 ft 3 in) in length, with Catlocarpio often being reputed to be the largest cyprinid known to exist, supposedly reaching 3 metres (9.8 ft) and 300 kilograms (660 lb) in size. The subfamily, originally described as a tribe, is distinguished from other cyprinids by a combination of traits: tetraploidy (2n = 98), a single row of pharyngeal teeth with 4 on each side, the last simple anal-fin ray being segmented and flexible, and scales which cover most of the body.

== Genera ==
Probarbinae contains the following genera:

- Catlocarpio Boulenger, 1898
- Probarbus Sauvage, 1880
