= Cophecheilus =

Scientific classification
- Kingdom: Animalia
- Phylum: Chordata
- Class: Actinopterygii
- Order: Cypriniformes
- Family: Cyprinidae
- Subfamily: Labeoninae
- Genus: Cophecheilus; Y. Zhu, E. Zhang, M. Zhang & Y. Q. Han, 2011

Type species
- Cophecheilus bamen Y. Zhu, E. Zhang, M. Zhang & Y. Q. Han, 2011

Genus of fishes

Cophecheilus is a genus of fish in the family Cyprinidae. These fish occur only in China.

== Species ==
There are currently 2 recognized species in this genus:

- Cophecheilus bamen Y. Zhu, E. Zhang, M. Zhang & Y. Q. Han, 2011
- Cophecheilus brevibarbatus A. Y. He, H. Wei, Y. He, Jian Yang, 2015
