= Placocheilus caudofasciatus =

Conservation status
- Least Concern (IUCN 3.1)

Scientific classification
- Kingdom: Animalia
- Phylum: Chordata
- Class: Actinopterygii
- Order: Cypriniformes
- Family: Cyprinidae
- Genus: Placocheilus
- Species: P. caudofasciatus

Binomial name
- Placocheilus caudofasciatus (Pellegrin & Chevey, 1936)

Synonyms
- Discognathus caudofasciatus Pellegrin & Chevey, 1936; Garra caudofasciatus Pellegrin & Chevey, 1936; Garra angulostoma Mai, 1978; Placocheilus robustus Zhang, He & Chen, 2002

Species of fish

Placocheilus caudofasciatus is a species of cyprinid native to Laos, Vietnam and China in eastern Asia. This species can reach a length of 10.9 centimetres (4.3 in) SL.
