= Parasinilabeo =

Scientific classification
- Kingdom: Animalia
- Phylum: Chordata
- Class: Actinopterygii
- Order: Cypriniformes
- Family: Cyprinidae
- Subfamily: Labeoninae
- Genus: Parasinilabeo; H. W. Wu, 1939

Type species
- Parasinilabeo assimilis Wu & Yao, 1977

Synonyms
- Pararectoris Su, Yang and Cui, 2001

Genus of fishes

Parasinilabeo is a genus of cyprinid fish endemic to China. There are currently six described species in this genus.

== Species ==
- Parasinilabeo assimilis H. W. Wu & Yao, 1977
- Parasinilabeo longibarbus Y. Zhu, C. Lan & E. Zhang, 2006
- Parasinilabeo longicorpus E. Zhang, 2000
- Parasinilabeo longiventralis Y. F. Huang, X. Y. Chen & J. X. Yang, 2007
- Parasinilabeo maculatus E. Zhang, 2000
- Parasinilabeo microps (R. F. Su, J. X. Yang & G. H. Cui, 2001)
