= Lanlabeo =

Scientific classification
- Kingdom: Animalia
- Phylum: Chordata
- Class: Actinopterygii
- Division: Teleostei
- Order: Cypriniformes
- Family: Cyprinidae
- Subfamily: Labeoninae
- Genus: Lanlabeo; M. Yao, Y. He & Z.-G. Peng, 2018
- Species: L. duanensis

Binomial name
- Lanlabeo duanensis M. Yao, Y. He & Z.-G. Peng, 2018

Genus of freshwater ray-finned fish

Lanlabeo is a monospecific genus of freshwater ray-finned fish belonging to the family Cyprinidae, the family which includes the carps, barbs, minnows and related fishes. The only species in the genus is Lanlabeo duanensis. This species was first formally described in 2018 from the drainage basin of the Pearl River in Guangxi,
