= Discocheilus wuluoheensis =

Scientific classification
- Kingdom: Animalia
- Phylum: Chordata
- Class: Actinopterygii
- Order: Cypriniformes
- Family: Cyprinidae
- Genus: Discolabeo
- Species: D. wuluoheensis

Binomial name
- Discolabeo wuluoheensis (W. X. Li, Z. M. Lu & W. L. Mao, 1996)

Synonyms
- Discolabeo wuluoheensis W. X. Li, Z. M. Lu & W. L. Mao, 1996

Species of fish

Discocheilus wuluoheensis is a species of freshwater ray-finned fish belonging to the family Cyprinidae, the carps, barbs, minnows and related fishes. This fish is endemic to China.
