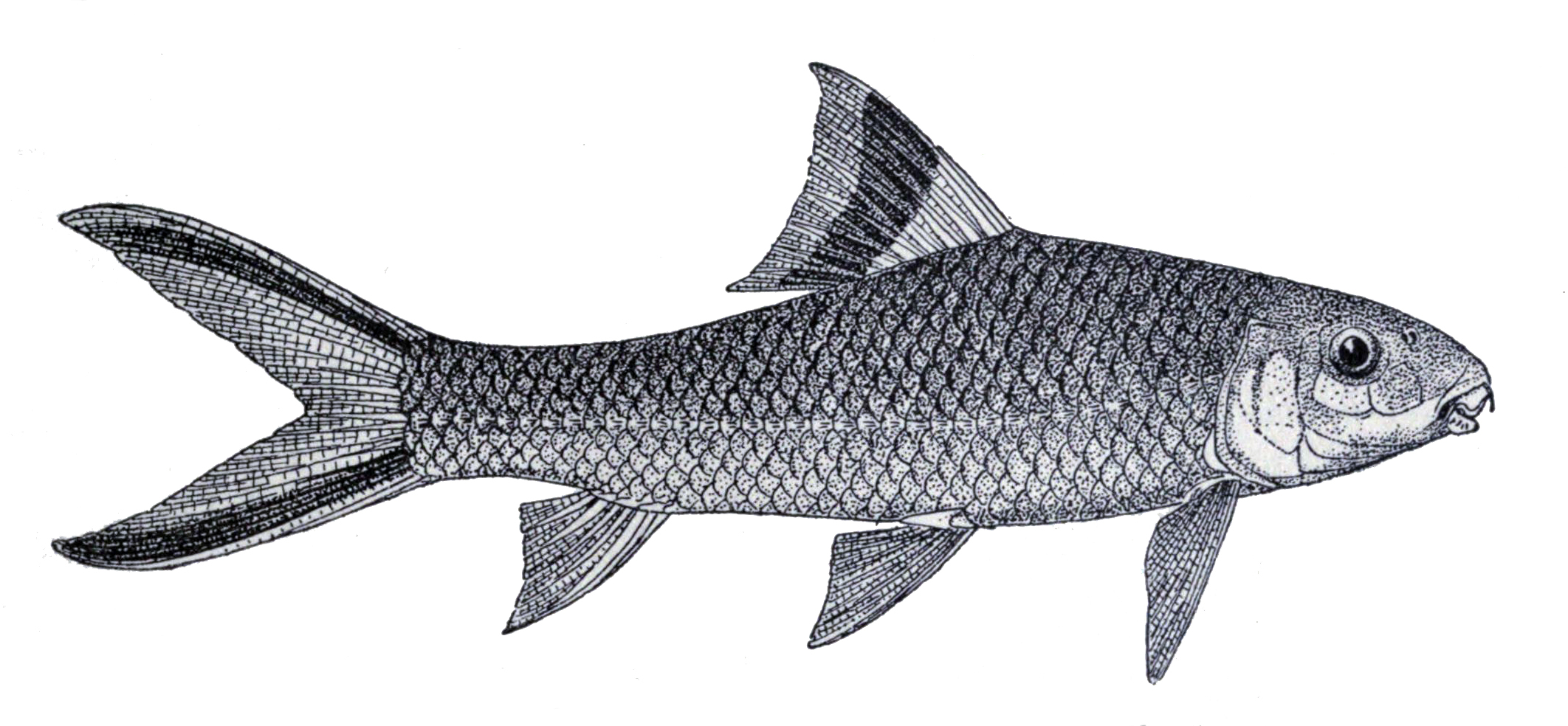

Conservation status
- Least Concern (IUCN 3.1)

Scientific classification
- Kingdom: Animalia
- Phylum: Chordata
- Class: Actinopterygii
- Order: Cypriniformes
- Family: Cyprinidae
- Subfamily: Labeoninae
- Genus: Barbichthys; Bleeker, 1860
- Species: B. laevis

Binomial name
- Barbichthys laevis (Valenciennes, 1842)

Synonyms
- Barbus laevis Valenciennes, 1842; Barbus brachynemus Bleeker, 1849; Barbus gobioides Bleeker, 1852; Barbichthys nitidus Sauvage, 1878

= Sucker barb =

Species of fish

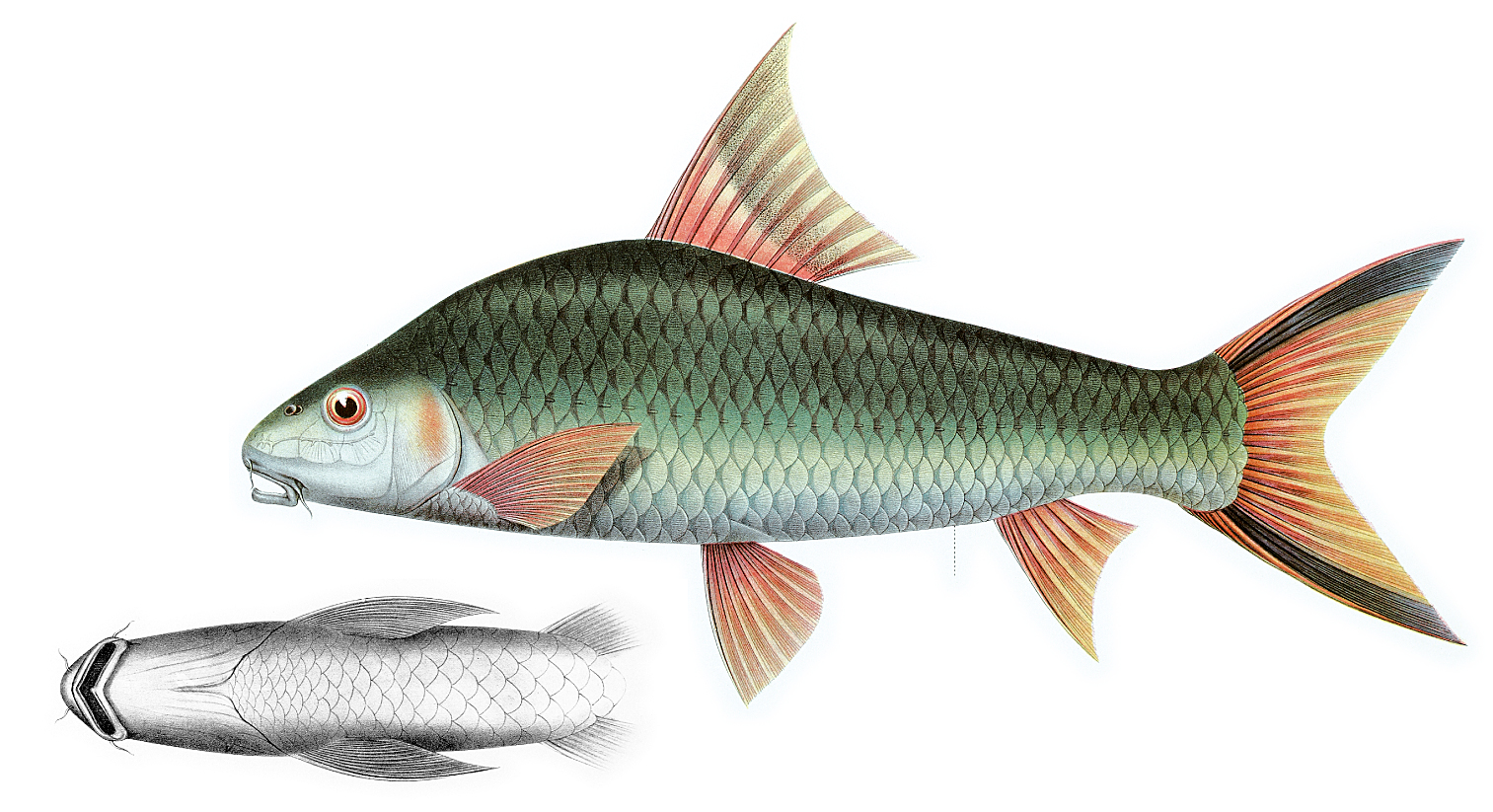
Barbichthys laevis

The sucker barb (Barbichthys laevis) is a species of freshwater ray-finned fish belonging to the family Cyprinidae, the carps, barbs, minnows and related fishes. It is the only species in the monospecific genus Barbichthys. This species is found in southeast Asia where it occurs in Laos, Cambodia, Thailand, Malaysia, Brunei and Indonesia, in Java, Sumatra and Kalimantan.
