= Zuojiangia =

Scientific classification
- Kingdom: Animalia
- Phylum: Chordata
- Class: Actinopterygii
- Order: Cypriniformes
- Family: Cyprinidae
- Genus: Zuojiangia; L. P. Zheng, Y. He, J. X. Yang & L. B. Wu, 2018
- Species: Z. jingxiensis

Binomial name
- Zuojiangia jingxiensis L. P. Zheng, Y. He, J. X. Yang & L. B. Wu, 2018

Genus of fishes

Zuojiangia is a monospecific genus of freshwater ray-finned fish belonging to the family Cyprinidae, the family which also includes the carps, barbs, minnows and related fishes. The only species in this genus is Zuojiangia jingxiensis which was first formally described in 2018, and was collected from a type locality given as the outlet of a karst cave and a small, connected unnamed stream in the drainage of the Zuojiang River, a tributary of the Pearl River at Biaoliang Village in Lutong Town in Jingxi County, Guangxi Province. The type locality was destroyed in 2013.
