= Gymnopilus robustus =

Scientific classification
- Kingdom: Fungi
- Division: Basidiomycota
- Class: Agaricomycetes
- Order: Agaricales
- Family: Hymenogastraceae
- Genus: Gymnopilus
- Species: G. robustus

Binomial name
- Gymnopilus robustus Guzm.-Dáv.

Species of fungus

Gymnopilus robustus Mycological characteristics
- Gills on hymenium
- Cap is convex
- Hymenium is adnexed or adnate
- Ecology is saprotrophic

Gymnopilus robustus is a species of mushroom in the family Hymenogastraceae.

== See also ==
- List of Gymnopilus species
