= Sinocrossocheilus =

Scientific classification
- Kingdom: Animalia
- Phylum: Chordata
- Class: Actinopterygii
- Order: Cypriniformes
- Family: Cyprinidae
- Subfamily: Labeoninae
- Genus: Sinocrossocheilus; H. W. Wu, 1977

Type species
- Sinocrossocheilus guizhouensis H. W. Wu, 1977

Genus of fishes

Sinocrossocheilus is a genus of cyprinid fish endemic to fast-flowing rivers in China and sometimes found in caves.

== Species ==
These are the described species in this genus:

- Sinocrossocheilus guizhouensis H. W. Wu, 1977
- Sinocrossocheilus labiatus R. F. Su, J. X. Yang & G. H. Cui, 2003
