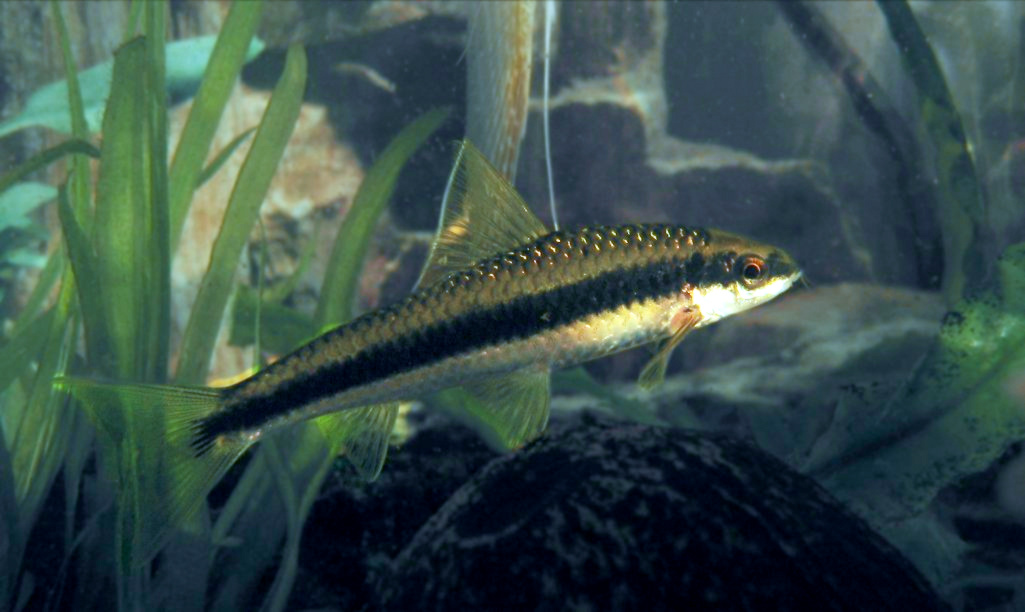
- Crossocheilus siamensis Also known as one of "Siamese algae eater"

Scientific classification
- Kingdom: Animalia
- Phylum: Chordata
- Class: Actinopterygii
- Division: Teleostei
- Order: Cypriniformes
- Family: Cyprinidae
- Subfamily: Labeoninae; Bleeker, 1859

Diversity
- See text

Synonyms
- Garrinae; Labeonini (but see text)

= Labeoninae =

Subfamily of fishes

Labeonins or labeoins are fish of the subfamily Labeoninae (or the tribe Labeonini, when subsumed into subfamily Cyprininae), which are ray-finned fishes in the family Cyprinidae of order Cypriniformes. They are freshwater fish, with the greatest species richness in the region around southern China, though they are present throughout subtropical and tropical Asia as well as equivalent regions in Africa. They are a generally very apomorphic group, perhaps the most "advanced" or derived of the Cyprinidae.

Anatomically, the labeonins are distinguished by traits of the Weberian apparatus contacting the skull with the supraneural bones, and its basioccipital process being concave in cross-section. The first vertebra has a parapophysis that is elongated to forward and partially overlaps the basioccipital process. The fourth vertebra, meanwhile, has a short but stout transverse process that is prominently elongated ventrally; the os suspensorium is often hidden behind if viewed from the side. In the skull, the frontal and sphenotic bones have prominent foramina. In the anal fin, the first pterygiophore is elongated and has well-developed anterior and posterior flanges, with the former very large and concave at the distal end. Most labeonins have the skinny flap of the underside of the snout well-developed into a fleshy cap that at least partially hides the upper lip except when feeding, and a similar structure at the lower lip.

Notable genera include Crossocheilus, Epalzeorhynchos and Garra, which contain some of the popular aquarium fishes often called "algae eaters", e.g. the Siamese algae-eater (Crossocheilus siamensis) along with "pedicure fish" such as Garra rufa. Labeo – the type genus of this subfamily – contains many sizeable species which are often used as food.

== Taxonomy ==
This clade include the group sometimes separated as Garrinae, but these do not seem to be that distinct. In fact, the entire Labeoninae is merged into the Cyprininae by a number of authors; in any case, these two and the former "Barbinae" form a close-knit group whose internal phylogeny is far from resolved. If the subfamily is considered distinct, it is typically split in the tribes Labeonini (which are able to swim well in open water) and Garrini (which are mostly benthic), and sometimes in addition the Banganini (which are somewhat intermediate in habitus); this classification is however not based on genetic studies. If the labeo lineage is included in the Cyprininae, it becomes the tribe Labeonini, while its two (or three) subdivisions are the subtribes Labeoina, Garraina and perhaps Banganina.

=== Genera ===
Labeoninae contains the following genera:

- Ageneiogarra Garman, 1912
- Altigena Burton, 1934
- Bangana Hamilton, 1822
- Barbichthys Bleeker, 1860
- Ceratogarra Kottelat, 2020
- Cirrhinus Oken, 1817
- Cophecheilus Y. Zhu, E. Zhang, M. Zhang & Y. Q. Han, 2011
- Crossocheilus Kuhl & van Hasselt, 1823
- Decorus Zheng, Chen & Yang, 2019
- Diplocheilichthys Bleeker, 1859
- Discocheilus E. Zhang, 1997
- Discogobio S. Y. Lin, 1931
- Epalzeorhynchos Bleeker, 1855
- Fivepearlus C.-Q. Li, H. Yang, W. Li & H. Chen 2017
- Garra Hamilton, 1822
- Garroides V. H. Nguyễn & T.H.N. Vũ, 2014
- Guigarra Z.-B. Wang, X.-Y. Chen & L.-P. Zheng 2022
- Gymnostomus Heckel, 1843
- Henicorhynchus H. M. Smith, 1945
- Hongshuia E. Zhang, X. Qiang & J. H. Lan, 2008
- Incisilabeo Fowler, 1937
- Labeo Cuvier, 1816
- Labiobarbus van Hasselt, 1823
- Lanlabeo M. Yao, Y. He & Z.-G. Peng, 2018
- Linichthys E. Zhang & Fang, 2005
- Lobocheilos Bleeker, 1854
- Longanalus W. X. Li, 2006
- Mekongina Fowler, 1937
- Osteochilus Günther, 1868
- Paracrossochilus Popta, 1904
- Parapsilorhynchus Hora, 1921
- Paraqianlabeo H.-T. Zhao, Sullivan, Y.-G. Zhang & Z.-G. Peng 2014
- Parasinilabeo H. W. Wu, 1939
- Placocheilus H.-W. Wu, 1977
- Prolixicheilus L.-P. Zheng, X.-Y. Chen & J.-X. Yang, 2016
- Protolabeo L. An, B. S. Liu, Y. H. Zhao & C. G. Zhang, 2010
- Pseudocrossocheilus E. Zhang & J.-X. Chen, 1997
- Pseudogyrinocheilus P.-W. Fang, 1933
- Pseudoplacocheilus X. Li, W. Zhou, C. Sun & X. Yun, 2024
- Ptychidio Myers, 1930
- Qianlabeo E. Zhang & Yi-Yu Chen, 2004
- Rectoris S.-Y. Lin, 1935
- Schismatorhynchos Bleeker, 1855
- Semilabeo Peters, 1881
- Sinigarra E. Zhang & W. Zhou, 2012
- Sinilabeo Rendahl, 1933
- Sinocrossocheilus H.-W. Wu, 1977
- Speolabeo Kottelat, 2017
- Stenorynchoacrum Y. F. Huang, J. X. Yang & X. Y. Chen, 2014
- Supradiscus X. Li, W. Zhou, C. Sun & X. Yun, 2024
- Tariqilabeo Mirza & Saboohi, 1990
- Thynnichthys Bleeker, 1859
- Vinagarra V. H. Nguyễn & T. A. Bùi, 2009
- Zuojiangia L.-P. Zheng, Y. He, J. X. Yang & L.B. Wu 2018

=== Phylogeny ===
The following is a maximum likelihood phylogenetic tree from a study of a combined genetic dataset, from Zheng et al. 2012, with binomial names updated and well-recovered clades labeled with A, B, C, and D:

- Labeoninae
  - A
    - - Labeo bata
      - - Incisilabeo behri
        - Labeo boga
    - - Cirrhinus microlepis
      - - Cirrhinus mrigala
        - ⊞Labeo spp.
          ⊟
          - - - Labeo rohita
              - Labeo stolizkae
            - - Labeo calbasu
              - Labeo chrysophekadion
          - - Labeo pierrei
            - - Labeo batesii
              - - Labeo weeksii
                - Labeo senegalensis
  - - B
      - Ceratogarra fasciacauda
      - - ⊞Garra spp.
          ⊟
          - Garra flavatra
          - - Garra spilota
            - - - Garra annandalei
                - Garra gotyla gotyla
              - - - Garra fuliginosa
                  - - Garra orientalis
                    - Garra mirofrontis
                - - Garra ceylonensis
                  - - Garra congoensis
                    - Garra makiensis
        - - Garra tengchongensis
          - - Tariqilabeo burmanicus
            - Tariqilabeo bicornis
    - - C
        - - - Labiobarbus lineatus
            - Labiobarbus siamensis
          - ⊞Osteochilus spp.
            ⊟
            - Osteochilus melanopleurus
            - - Osteochilus microcephalus
              - - Osteochilus waandersii
                - - Osteochilus lini
                  - Osteochilus salsburyi
        - - Cirrhinus molitorella
          - - - Lobocheilos melanotaenia
              - ⊞Henicorhynchus spp.
                ⊟
                - Henicorhynchus lineatus
                - - Henicorhynchus lobatus
                  - Henicorhynchus siamensis
            - - Crossocheilus reticulatus
              - ⊞Epalzeorhynchos spp.
                ⊟
                - Epalzeorhynchos kalopterus
                - - Epalzeorhynchos bicolor
                  - Epalzeorhynchos frenatum
      - D
        - D1
          Decorus lemassoni
        - - D2
            - - Supradiscus micropulvinus
              - Ageneiogarra imberba
            - - Pseudoplacocheilus cryptonema
              - - Mekongina erythrospila
                - - Altigena tonkinensis
                  - Altigena lippa
          - D3
            - - Parasinilabeo assimilis
              - - Semilabeo obscurus
                - - Rectoris posehensis
                  - Stenorynchoacrum xijiangensis
            - - ⊞Pseudocrossocheilus spp.
                ⊟
                - Pseudocrossocheilus liuchengensis
                - - - Pseudocrossocheilus tridentis
                    - Pseudocrossocheilus papillolabrus
                  - - Pseudocrossocheilus longibullus
                    - - Pseudocrossocheilus bamaensis
                      - Pseudocrossocheilus nigrovittatus
              - - - Pseudogyrinocheilus prochilus
                  - Qianlabeo striatus
                - - Ptychidio jordani
                  - - Sinocrossocheilus labiatus
                    - - ⊞Hongshuia spp.
                        ⊟
                        - Hongshuia megalophthalmus
                        - - Hongshuia microstomatus
                          - Hongshuia paoli
                      - ⊞Discogobio & Discocheilus spp.
                        ⊟
                        - Discogobio yunnanensis
                        - - - Discocheilus wui
                            - Discocheilus wuluoheensis
                          - - Discogobio tetrabarbatus
                            - - Discogobio brachyphysallidos
                              - Discogobio macrophysallidos
