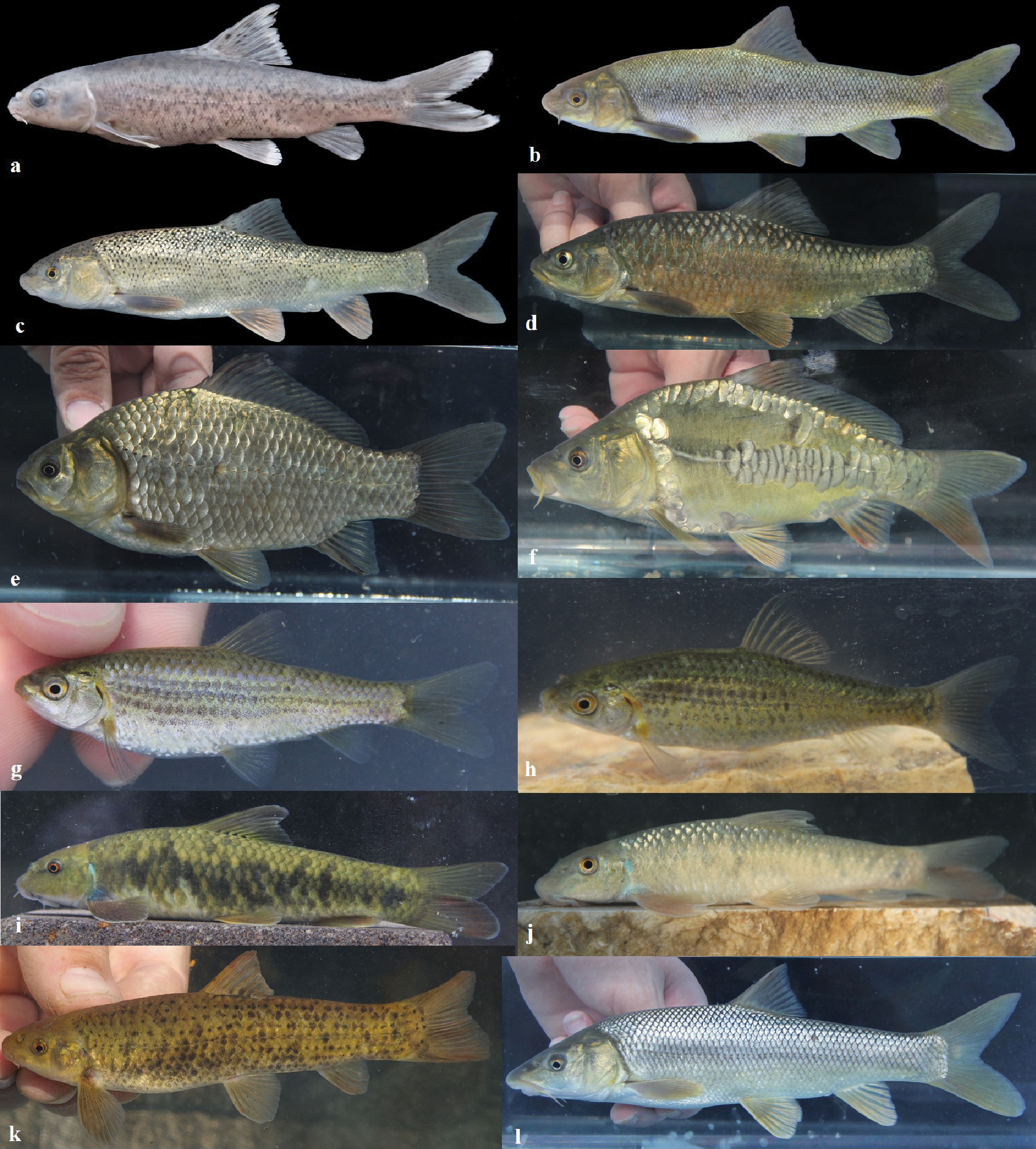
- Diversity of cyprinids from the Seyhan, Ceyhan and Orontes river systems

Scientific classification
- Kingdom: Animalia
- Phylum: Chordata
- Class: Actinopterygii
- Division: Teleostei
- Order: Cypriniformes
- Suborder: Cyprinoidei
- Family: Cyprinidae; Rafinesque, 1815

Type genus
- Cyprinus Linnaeus, 1758

Subfamilies
- see text

= Cyprinidae =

Cyprinidae Temporal range: Eocene - Holocene

Family of freshwater fish

Cyprinidae is a family of medium-to-large, mostly pelagic, freshwater ray-finned fishes commonly referred to as the carp family including the true carps, barbs, and barbels, among others. These cyprinids also share sister taxa with the danionins and minnows under the suborder Cyprinoidei. Cyprinidae is the largest and most diverse fish family, and the largest family of vertebrates overall, with roughly 1,780 species split into 166 valid genera.

Cyprinoids range from the 12 mm (0.5 in) micro glassfishes (genus Danionella), to the 3 m (9.8 ft)-long Siamese carp (Catlocarpio siamensis). The family name is derived from the Greek word kyprînos (κυπρῖνος 'carp').

== Biology and ecology ==
Cyprinids are stomachless, or agastric, fish with toothless jaws. Even so, food can be effectively chewed by the gill rakers of the specialized last gill bow. These pharyngeal teeth allow the fish to make chewing motions against a chewing plate formed by a bony process of the skull. The pharyngeal teeth are unique to each species and are used to identify species. Strong pharyngeal teeth allow fish such as the common carp and ide to eat hard baits such as snails and bivalves.

Hearing is a well-developed sense in the cyprinids since they have the Weberian organ, three specialized vertebral processes that transfer motion of the gas bladder to the inner ear. The vertebral processes of the Weberian organ also permit a cyprinid to detect changes in motion of the gas bladder due to atmospheric conditions or depth changes. The cyprinids are considered physostomes because the pneumatic duct is retained in adult stages and the fish are able to gulp air to fill the gas bladder, or they can dispose of excess gas to the gut.

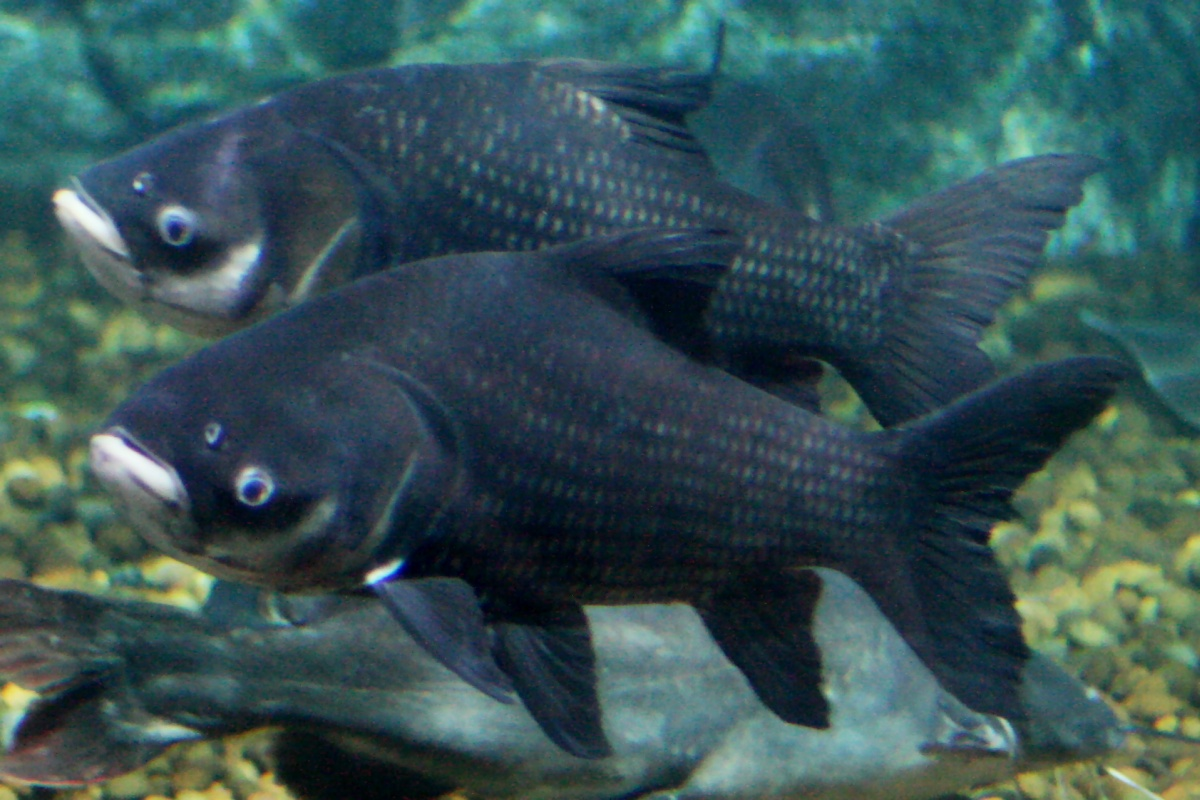
Giant barbs (Catlocarpio siamensis) are the largest members of this family.

Cyprinids are native to North America, Africa, and Eurasia. The largest known cyprinid is the giant barb (Catlocarpio siamensis), which may grow up to 3 m (9.8 ft) in length and 300 kg (660 lb) in weight. Other very large species that can surpass 2 m (6.6 ft) are the golden mahseer (Tor putitora) and mangar (Luciobarbus esocinus).

All fish in this family are egg-layers and most do not guard their eggs; however, a few species build nests and/or guard the eggs.

Cyprinids contain the only known example of androgenesis in a vertebrate, in the Squalius alburnoides allopolyploid complex.

Most cyprinids feed mainly on invertebrates and vegetation, probably due to the lack of teeth and stomach; however, some species, like the asp, are predators that specialize in fish. Many species, such as the ide and the common rudd, prey on small fish when individuals become large enough. Even small species, such as the moderlieschen, are opportunistic predators that will eat larvae of the common frog in artificial circumstances.

Some cyprinids, such as the grass carp, are specialized herbivores; others, such as the common nase, eat algae and biofilms, while others, such as the black carp, specialize in snails, and some, such as the silver carp, are specialized filter feeders. For this reason, cyprinids are often introduced as a management tool to control various factors in the aquatic environment, such as aquatic vegetation and diseases transmitted by snails.

Unlike most fish species, cyprinids generally increase in abundance in eutrophic lakes. Here, they contribute towards positive feedback as they are efficient at eating the zooplankton that would otherwise graze on the algae, reducing its abundance.

== Relationship with humans ==
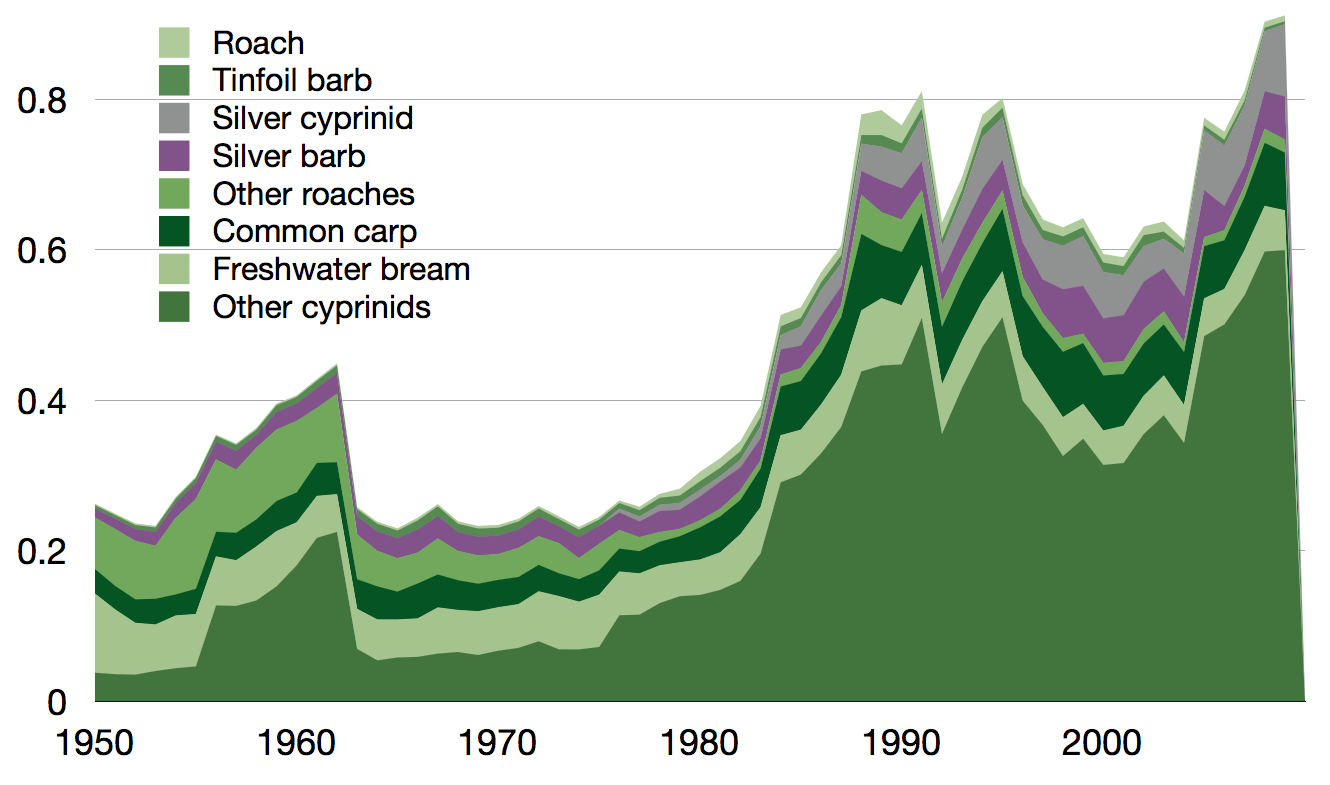
Wild capture of cyprinids by species in million tonnes, 1950–2009, as reported by the FAO

=== Food ===
Cyprinids are highly important food fish; they are fished and farmed across Eurasia. In land-locked countries in particular, cyprinids are often the major species of fish eaten because they make the largest part of biomass in most water types except for fast-flowing rivers. In Eastern Europe, they are often prepared with traditional methods, such as drying and salting. The prevalence of inexpensive frozen fish products made this less important now than it was in earlier times. Nonetheless, in certain places, they remain popular for food, as well as recreational fishing, for ornamental use, and have been deliberately stocked in ponds and lakes for centuries for this reason.

=== Sport ===
Cyprinids are popular for angling especially for match fishing (due to their dominance in biomass and numbers) and fishing for common carp because of its size and strength.

=== As pest control ===
Several cyprinids have been introduced to waters outside their natural ranges to provide food, sport, or biological control for some pest species. The common carp (Cyprinus carpio) and the grass carp (Ctenopharyngodon idella) are the most important of these, for example in Florida.

=== As a pest species ===
Carp in particular can stir up sediment, reducing the clarity of the water and making plant growth difficult.

In America and Australia, such as the Asian carp in the Mississippi Basin, they have become invasive species that compete with native fishes or disrupt the environment.

Cyprinus carpio is a major pest species in Australia impacting freshwater environments, amenity, and the agricultural economy, devastating biodiversity by decimating native fish populations where they first became established as a major pest in the wild in the 1960s. In the major river system of eastern Australia, the Murray-Darling Basin, they constitute 80–90 per cent of fish biomass.

In 2016 the federal government announced A$15.2 million to fund the National Carp Control Plan to investigate using Cyprinid herpesvirus 3 (carp virus) as a biological control agent while minimising impacts on industry and environment should a carp virus release go ahead. Despite initial, favourable assessment, in 2020 this plan was found to be unlikely to work due to the high fecundity of the fish.

=== Aquarium fish ===
Numerous cyprinids have become popular and important within the aquarium and fishpond hobbies, most famously the goldfish, which was bred in China from wild Carassius species (Carassius auratus). First imported into Europe around 1728, it was originally much-fancied by the Chinese nobility as early as 1150 AD and, after it arrived there in 1502, also in Japan. In addition to the goldfish, the amur carp was bred in Japan into the colorful ornamental variety known as koi — or more accurately nishikigoi (錦鯉), as koi (鯉) simply means "common carp" in Japanese — from the 18th century until today.

Other popular aquarium cyprinids include danionins, rasborines and true barbs. Larger species are bred by the thousands in outdoor ponds, particularly in Southeast Asia, and trade in these aquarium fishes is of considerable commercial importance. The small rasborines and danionins are perhaps only rivalled by characids (tetras) and poecilid livebearers in their popularity for community aquaria. Some of the most popular cyprinids among aquarists, other than goldfish and koi, include the cherry barb, Harlequin rasbora, pearl danios, rainbow sharks, tiger barbs, and the White Cloud Mountain minnow.

One particular species of these small and undemanding danionins is the zebrafish (Danio rerio). It has become the standard model species for studying developmental genetics of vertebrates, in particular fish.

=== Conservation ===
Habitat destruction and other causes have reduced the wild stocks of several cyprinids to dangerously low levels; some are already entirely extinct. In particular, the cyprinids of the subfamily Leuciscinae from southwestern North America have been severely affected by pollution and unsustainable water use in the early to mid-20th century. The majority of globally extinct cypriniform species in fact belong to the leuciscinid cyprinids from the southwestern United States and northern Mexico.

== Systematics ==
The massive diversity of cyprinids has so far made it difficult to resolve their phylogeny in sufficient detail to make assignment to subfamilies more than tentative in many cases. Some distinct lineages obviously exist – for example, the Cultrinae and Leuciscinae, regardless of their exact delimitation, are rather close relatives and stand apart from Cyprininae – but the overall systematics and taxonomy of the Cyprinidae remain a subject of considerable debate. A large number of genera are incertae sedis, too equivocal in their traits and/or too little-studied to permit assignment to a particular subfamily with any certainty.

Part of the solution seems that the delicate rasborines are the core group, consisting of minor lineages that have not shifted far from their evolutionary niche, or have coevolved for millions of years. These are among the most basal lineages of living cyprinids. Other "rasborines" are apparently distributed across the diverse lineages of the family.

The validity and circumscription of proposed subfamilies like the Labeoninae or Squaliobarbinae also remain doubtful, although the latter do appear to correspond to a distinct lineage. The sometimes-seen grouping of the large-headed carps (Hypophthalmichthyinae) with Xenocypris, though, seems quite in error. More likely, the latter are part of the Cultrinae.

The entirely paraphyletic "Barbinae" and the disputed Labeoninae might be better treated as part of the Cyprininae, forming a close-knit group whose internal relationships are still little known. The small African "barbs" do not belong in Barbus sensu stricto – indeed, they are as distant from the typical barbels and the typical carps (Cyprinus) as these are from Garra (which is placed in the Labeoninae by most who accept the latter as distinct) and thus might form another as yet unnamed subfamily. However, as noted above, how various minor lineages tie into this has not yet been resolved; therefore, such a radical move, though reasonable, is probably premature.

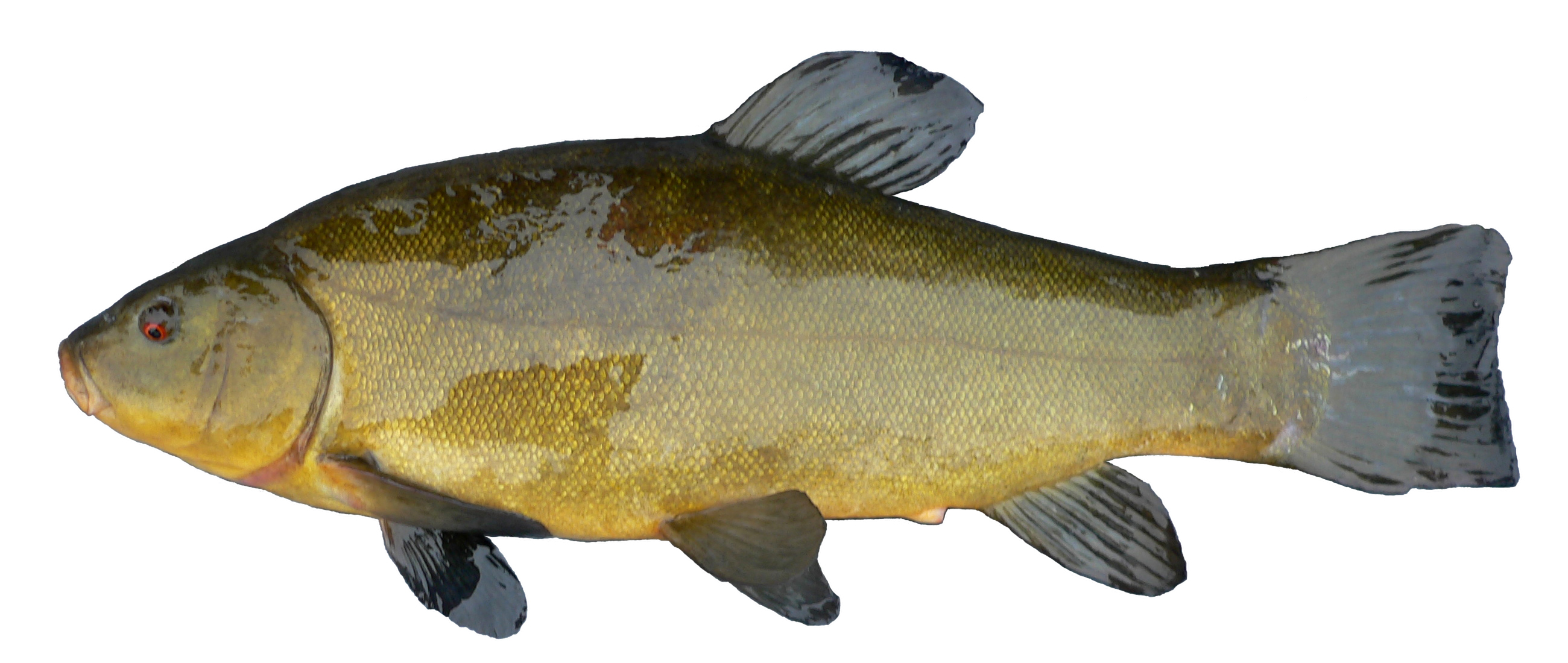
The tench, Tinca tinca, is of unclear affiliations and often placed in a subfamily or family of its own.

The tench (Tinca tinca), a significant food species farmed in western Eurasia in large numbers, is unusual. It is most often grouped with the Leuciscinae, but even when these were rather loosely circumscribed, it always stood apart. A cladistic analysis of DNA sequence data of the S7 ribosomal protein intron 1 supports the view that it is distinct enough to constitute a monotypic subfamily. It also suggests it may be closer to the small East Asian Aphyocypris, Hemigrammocypris, and Yaoshanicus. They would have diverged roughly at the same time from cyprinids of east-central Asia, perhaps as a result of the Alpide orogeny that vastly changed the topography of that region in the late Paleogene, when their divergence presumably occurred.

A DNA-based analysis of these fish places the Rasborinae as the basal lineage with the Cyprininae as a sister clade to the Leuciscinae. The subfamilies Acheilognathinae, Gobioninae, and Leuciscinae are monophyletic.

More recent studies split the leuciscids, danionids, xenocyprids, and many others out of the family. However, even with these splits, Cyprinidae still remains the largest fish family.

=== Subfamilies and genera ===
Eschmeyer's Catalog of Fishes sets out the subfamilies and genera within the family Cyprinidae as follows:

- Subfamily Acrossocheilinae L. Yang et al, 2015
  - Acrossocheilus Oshima, 1919
  - Folifer H. W. Wu, 1977
  - Onychostoma Günther, 1896
- Subfamily Barbinae Bleeker, 1859
  - Aulopyge Heckel, 1841
  - Barbus Daudin, 1805
  - Caecocypris Banister & Bunni, 1980
  - Capoeta Valenciennes, 1842
  - Cyprinion Heckel, 1843
  - Kantaka Hora, 1942
  - Luciobarbus Heckel, 1843
  - Paracapoeta Turan, Kaya, Aksu, Bektaş, 2022
  - Scaphiodonichthys Vinciguerra, 1890
  - Schizocypris Regan, 1914
  - Semiplotus Bleeker, 1860
- Subfamily Cyprininae Rafinesque, 1815
  - Aaptosyax Rainboth, 1991
  - Albulichthys Bleeker, 1860
  - Amblyrhynchichthys Bleeker, 1860
  - Balantiocheilos Bleeker, 1860
  - Barbonymus Kottelat, 1999
  - Carassioides Oshima, 1926
  - Carassius Jarocki, 1822
  - Cosmochilus Sauvage, 1878
  - Cyclocheilichthys Bleeker, 1859
  - Cyclocheilos Bleeker, 1859
  - Cyprinus Linnaeus, 1758
  - Discherodontus Rainboth, 1989
  - Eirmotus Schultz, 1959
  - Hypsibarbus Rainboth, 1996
  - Kalimantania Bănărescu, 1980
  - Laocypris Kottelat, 2000
  - Luciocyprinus Vaillant, 1904
  - Mystacoleucus Günther, 1868
  - Neobarynotus Bănărescu, 1980
  - Parasikukia Doi, 2000
  - Paraspinibarbus X.-L. Chu & Kottelat, 1989
  - Parator H. W. Wu, G. R. Yang, P. Q. Yue & H. J. Huang, 1963
  - Poropuntius H. M. Smith, 1931
  - Procypris S.-Y. Lin, 1933
  - Pseudosinocyclocheilus C.-G. Zhang & Y.-H. Zhao, 2016
  - Puntioplites H. M. Smith, 1929
  - Rohteichthys Bleeker, 1860
  - Sawbwa Annandale, 1918
  - Scaphognathops H.M. Smith, 1945
  - Sikukia H. M. Smith, 1931
  - Sinocyclocheilus P.-W. Fang, 1936
  - Troglocyclocheilus Kottelat & Bréhier, 1999
  - Typhlobarbus X.-L. Chu & W.-R. Chen, 1982
- Subfamily Labeoninae Bleeker, 1859
  - Ageneiogarra Garman, 1912
  - Altigena Burton, 1934
  - Bangana Hamilton, 1822
  - Barbichthys Bleeker, 1860
  - Ceratogarra Kottelat, 2020
  - Cirrhinus Oken, 1817
  - Cophecheilus Y. Zhu, E. Zhang, M. Zhang & Y. Q. Han, 2011
  - Crossocheilus Kuhl & van Hasselt, 1823
  - Decorus Zheng, Chen & Yang, 2019
  - Diplocheilichthys Bleeker, 1859
  - Discocheilus E. Zhang, 1997
  - Discogobio S. Y. Lin, 1931
  - Disymphia Endruweit, 2025
  - Epalzeorhynchos Bleeker, 1855
  - Fivepearlus C.-Q. Li, H. Yang, W. Li & H. Chen 2017
  - Garra Hamilton, 1822
  - Garroides V. H. Nguyễn & T.H. N. Vu, 2014
  - Guigarra Z.-B. Wang, X.-Y. Chen & L.-P. Zheng 2022
  - Gymnostomus Heckel, 1843
  - Henicorhynchus H. M. Smith, 1945
  - Hongshuia E. Zhang, X. Qiang & J. H. Lan, 2008
  - Incisilabeo Fowler, 1937
  - Labeo Cuvier, 1816
  - Labiobarbus van Hasselt, 1823
  - Lanlabeo M. Yao, Y. He & Z.-G. Peng, 2018
  - Linichthys E. Zhang & Fang, 2005
  - Lobocheilos Bleeker, 1854
  - Longanalus W. X. Li, 2006
  - Mekongina Fowler, 1937
  - Osteochilus Günther, 1868
  - Paracrossochilus Popta, 1904
  - Parapsilorhynchus Hora, 1921
  - Paraqianlabeo H.-T. Zhao, Sullivan, Y.-G. Zhang & Z.-G. Peng 2014
  - Parasinilabeo H. W. Wu, 1939
  - Placocheilus H.-W. Wu, 1977
  - Prolixicheilus L.-P. Zheng, X.-Y. Chen & J.-X. Yang, 2016
  - Protolabeo L. An, B. S. Liu, Y. H. Zhao & C. G. Zhang, 2010
  - Pseudocrossocheilus E. Zhang & J.-X. Chen, 1997
  - Pseudogyrinocheilus P.-W. Fang, 1933
  - Pseudoplacocheilus X. Li, W. Zhou, C. Sun & X. Yun, 2024
  - Ptychidio Myers, 1930
  - Qianlabeo E. Zhang & Yi-Yu Chen, 2004
  - Rectoris S.-Y. Lin, 1935
  - Schismatorhynchos Bleeker, 1855
  - Semilabeo Peters, 1881
  - Sinigarra E. Zhang & W. Zhou, 2012
  - Sinilabeo Rendahl, 1933
  - Sinocrossocheilus H.-W. Wu, 1977
  - Speolabeo Kottelat, 2017
  - Stenorynchoacrum Y. F. Huang, J. X. Yang & X. Y. Chen, 2014
  - Tariqilabeo Mirza & Saboohi, 1990
  - Thynnichthys Bleeker, 1859
  - Vinagarra V. H. Nguyễn & T. A. Bùi, 2009
  - Zuojiangia L.-P. Zheng, Y. He, J. X. Yang & L.B. Wu 2018
- Subfamily Probarbinae L. Yang et al, 2015
  - Catlocarpio Boulenger, 1898
  - Probarbus Sauvage, 1880
- Subfamily Schizopygopsinae Mirza, 1991
  - Diptychus Steindachner, 1866
  - Gaoligongia Liu, Liu, Xu, He, He & Chen, 2026
  - Gymnodiptychus Herzenstein, 1892
  - Oxygymnocypris W. H. Tsao, 1964
  - Ptychobarbus Steindachner, 1866
  - Schizopygopsis Steindachner, 1866
- Subfamily Schizothoracinae McClelland, 1842
  - Aspiorhynchus Kessler, 1879
  - Percocypris Y. T. Chu, 1935
  - Schizopyge Heckel, 1847
  - Schizothorax Heckel, 1838
- Subfamily Smiliogastrinae Bleeker, 1863
  - Amatolacypris Skelton, Swartz & Vreven, 2018
  - Barbodes Bleeker, 1859
  - Barboides Brüning, 1929
  - Bhava Sudasinghe, Rüber & Meegaskumbura, 2023
  - Caecobarbus Boulenger, 1921
  - Chagunius H.M. Smith, 1938
  - Cheilobarbus A. Smith 1841
  - Clypeobarbus Fowler, 1936
  - Coptostomabarbus David & Poll 1937
  - Dawkinsia Pethiyagoda, Meegaskumbura & Maduwage, 2012
  - Desmopuntius Kottelat, 2013
  - Eechathalakenda Menon, 1999
  - Enteromius Cope, 1867
  - Haludaria Pethiyagoda, 2013
  - Hampala Kuhl & van Hasselt, 1823
  - Namaquacypris Skelton, Swartz & Vreven, 2018
  - Oliotius Kottelat, 2013
  - Oreichthys H. M. Smith, 1933
  - Osteobrama Heckel, 1843
  - Pethia Pethiyagoda, Meegaskumbura & Maduwage, 2012
  - Plesiopuntius Sudasinghe, Rüber & Meegaskumbura, 2023
  - Prolabeo Norman, 1932
  - Prolabeops Schultz, 1941
  - Pseudobarbus A. Smith, 1841
  - Puntigrus Kottelat, 2013
  - Puntius Hamilton, 1822
  - Rohanella Sudasinghe, Rüber & Meegaskumbura, 2023
  - Rohtee Sykes 1839
  - Sedercypris Skelton, Swartz & Vreven, 2018
  - Striuntius Kottelat, 2013
  - Systomus McClelland, 1838
  - Waikhomia Katwate, Kumkar, Raghavan & Dahanukar, 2020
  - Xenobarbus Norman, 1923
- Subfamily Spinibarbinae Yang et al, 2015
  - Spinibarbichthys Oshima, 1926
  - Spinibarbus Oshima, 1919
- Subfamily Torinae Karaman, 1971
  - Acapoeta Cockerell, 1910
  - Arabibarbus Borkenhagen, 2014
  - Atlantor Borkenhagen & Freyhof, 2023
  - Carasobarbus Karaman, 1971
  - Hypselobarbus Bleeker, 1860
  - Labeobarbus Rüppell, 1835
  - Lepidopygopsis B. S. Raj 1941
  - Mesopotamichthys Karaman, 1971
  - Naziritor Mirza & Javed, 1985
  - Neolissochilus Rainboth, 1985
  - Osteochilichthys Hora, 1942
  - Pterocapoeta Günther, 1902
  - Sanagia Holly, 1926
  - Tor Gray, 1834

With such a large and diverse family the taxonomy and phylogenies are always being worked on so alternative classifications are being created as new information is discovered. The following is a phylogeny of Cyprinoidei, with clade names from van der Laan 2017:

- Cyprinoidei
  - - Psilorhynchidae
      Psilorhynchus
    - Cyprinidae
      - Probarbinae
      - - Labeoninae
          - Parapsilorhynchini
          - Labeonini
          - Garrini
        - - Torinae
          - - Smiliogastrinae
            - Cyprininae
              - - Cyprinini
                - Rohteichthyini
              - - - Acrossocheilini
                  - - Spinibarbini
                    - Schizothoracini
                - - Schizopygopsini
                  - Barbini
  - Leuciscidae

== See also ==
- List of fish families
