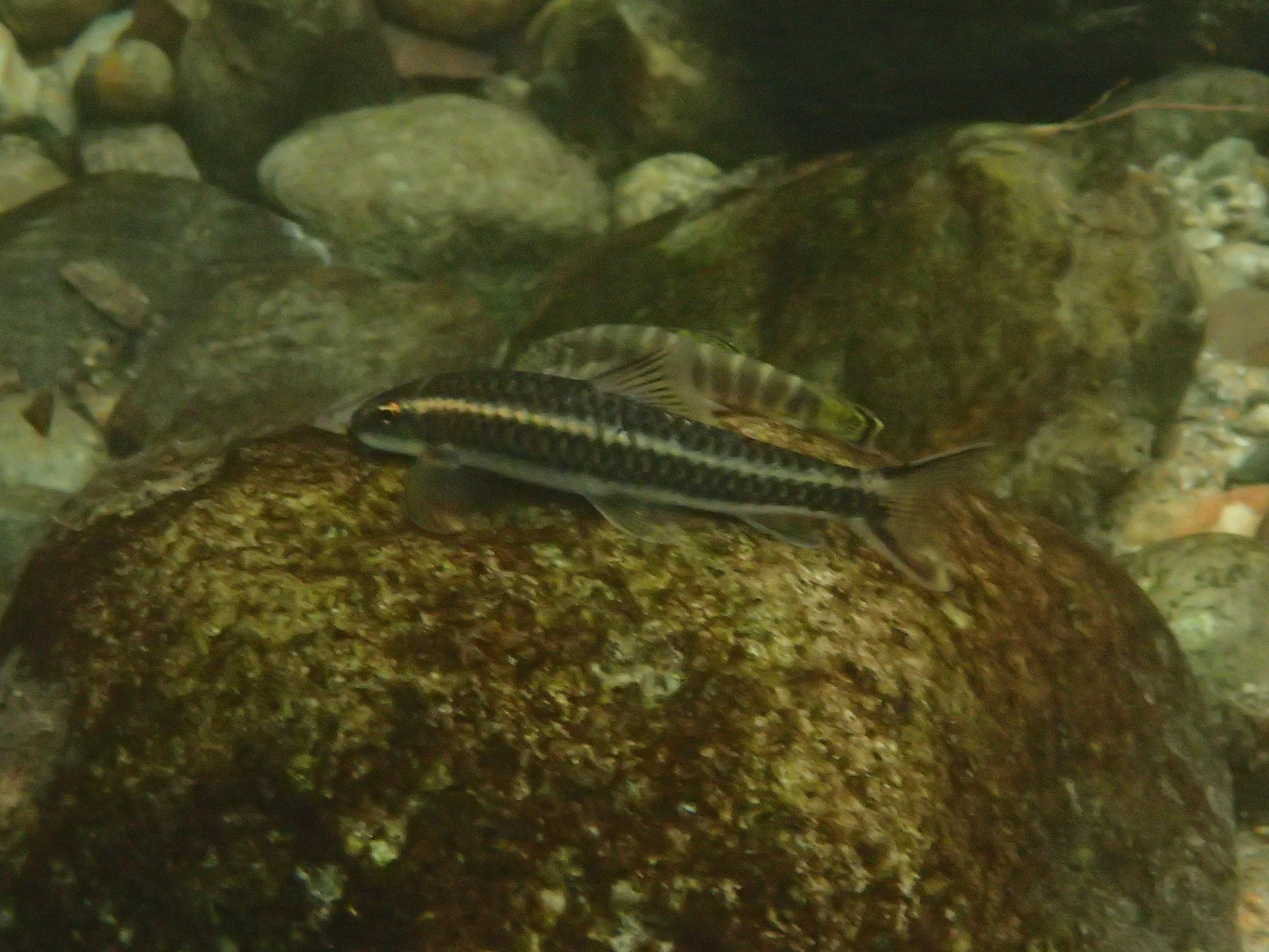
- Paracrossochilus vittatus

Scientific classification
- Kingdom: Animalia
- Phylum: Chordata
- Class: Actinopterygii
- Order: Cypriniformes
- Family: Cyprinidae
- Subfamily: Labeoninae
- Genus: Paracrossochilus; Popta, 1904

Type species
- Paracrossochilus bicornis Popta 1904

Diversity
- 2

Synonyms
- Paracrossocheilus

= Paracrossochilus =

Genus of fishes

Paracrossochilus is a genus of cyprinid fishes that belong to the subfamily Labeoninae. The genus contains two species, both of which are endemic to the island of Borneo in Southeastern Asia.

== Taxonomy ==
This genus belongs to the family Cyprinidae, also commonly known as carps. This family contains many genera and species however Paracrossochilus is closely related to Crossocheilus (fringe barbs) and Epalzeorhynchca with this genus being the outgroup.

This genus was described by Popta in 1904 as Paracrosschilus but also as Paracrossocheilus by the same author in 1904. This second name is now considered a synonym.

=== Species ===
This genus currently contains two species. However examined material shows that there are possibly more species that exist and haven’t been described yet. The currently recognized species are listed below:

- Paracrossochilus acerus Inger & P. K. Chin, 1962
- Paracrossochilus vittatus (Boulenger, 1894) (Type species)

== Description ==
Both species have similar color patterns. It is pale brown with its lower half of the flank being whitish to yellow. They have a broad and contrasted dark brown to black midlateral stripe on its body. This species have both pairs of barbels present. Their lips are continuous and are broadly connected, not only by the narrow frenulum. They have two rows with the presence of pharyngeal teeth. The submarginal bands along the upper and lower edges, while present, are faint.
