= Freshwater shark =

Freshwater sharks are sharks that live in freshwater environments. While the majority of sharks are solely marine, a small number of shark species have adapted to live in freshwater: the river sharks (of the genus Glyphis) live in freshwater and coastal marine environments. The bull shark (Carcharhinus leucas) is able to easily survive in fresh water environments, but it is not considered a true freshwater shark.

Some prehistoric sharks (in a broad sense, not restricted to Selachii), including hybodonts and xenacanths, are also thought to have inhabited freshwater environments.

== Bony fish ==
A small number of freshwater fish cyprinids and shark catfish (which are bony fish and thus quite unrelated to sharks) are also commonly called "freshwater sharks", "sharkminnows" or simply "sharks", particularly in the aquarium fish trade:

- Balantiocheilos melanopterus – Bala shark, tricolor shark, silver shark
- Balantiocheilos ambusticauda Burnt-tail shark
- Epalzeorhynchos – typical freshwater "sharks"
- Labeo – labeos
- Dawkinsia denisonii – Roseline shark
- Myxocyprinus – Hi/High-fin shark or banded shark
- Pangasiidae – shark catfish, including:
- Pangasianodon hypophthalmus – Iridescent Shark
- Pangasius sanitwongsei – sometimes called Paroon Shark or Hi-Fin shark in the aquarium trade
