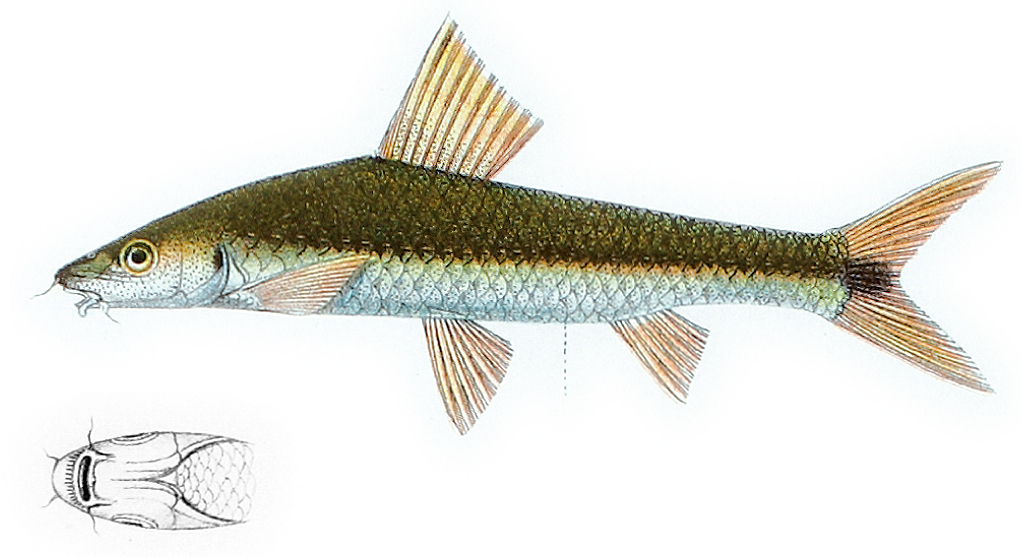

Conservation status
- Data Deficient (IUCN 3.1)

Scientific classification
- Kingdom: Animalia
- Phylum: Chordata
- Class: Actinopterygii
- Order: Cypriniformes
- Family: Cyprinidae
- Genus: Crossocheilus
- Species: C. langei

Binomial name
- Crossocheilus langei Bleeker, 1860

Synonyms
- Crossocheilos langei; Crossochilus langi; Crossocheilus pseudobagroides

= Crossocheilus langei =

Species of fish

Crossocheilus langei, also known as the red algae eater (but sold sometimes sold as "Siamese algae eater"), is a species of ray-finned fish in the genus Crossocheilus. It is native to Malaysia and Sumatra. This bottom-dwelling tropical fish is found in mainland Southeast Asia. Its natural habitats are streams and rivers as well as flooded forests during the rainy season. It is often confused with the Crossocheilus oblongus, however, both are algae eaters and will behave similarly.

== Description ==
The Siamese algae eater has a black horizontal stripe extending from opercle to tail. The stripe can fade to camouflage the Siamese algae eater against its surroundings. Genuine Crossocheilus siamensis, (incorrect species) without maxillary barbels and with deeply fringed V-shaped upper lip are rarely encountered in the aquarium trade.

The red algae eater is a species that is widely sold as "Siamese algae eater". It has a bright brownish elongate body with a slightly flat belly. It has a prominent brown-black horizontal stripe extending from nose to tail. This fish may grow to measure up to 16 centimetres (6.3 in). It possesses small maxillary barbels and an unfringed shallowly arcuate upper lip. Two other similar species are traded as Siamese algae eaters, namely Crossocheilus atrilimes, a species that prefers Java moss than red algae, and an undescribed species of Crossocheilus.

== Aquarium care ==
The hardy red algae eater Crossocheilus langei is commonly found in the aquarium trade and is one of the most popular and effective tank algae cleaners. They are active and fast swimmers that will school together if kept in a group, but some individuals may display aggression to their own kind or related fish. In general, the red algae eater can be kept in most community tanks and is reportedly much less aggressive than similar fish such as the Chinese algae eater or the red-tailed black shark.

Because the red algae eater is effective at controlling tank algae, many aquarists like to place them in heavily planted tanks with strong lighting to prevent the growth of algae. Unlike other aquarium algae eater fishes, the red algae eater is valued for its ability to eat red algae (particularly Audouinella). The fish, however, is an opportunistic feeder and will eat pellets and most other food, a tendency that strengthens with age.

The lid of the tank should be properly closed leaving no large hole for the fish to jump out of the tank.

Since they can't stay in mid water, they love driftwood/rocks and some plants that can support their weight to rest on.

Siamese algae eaters will often school together but are also content living solo. When two are kept together, they will often establish their own territory as they mature. They can be a long living fish, with reports of lifespans up to ten years.
