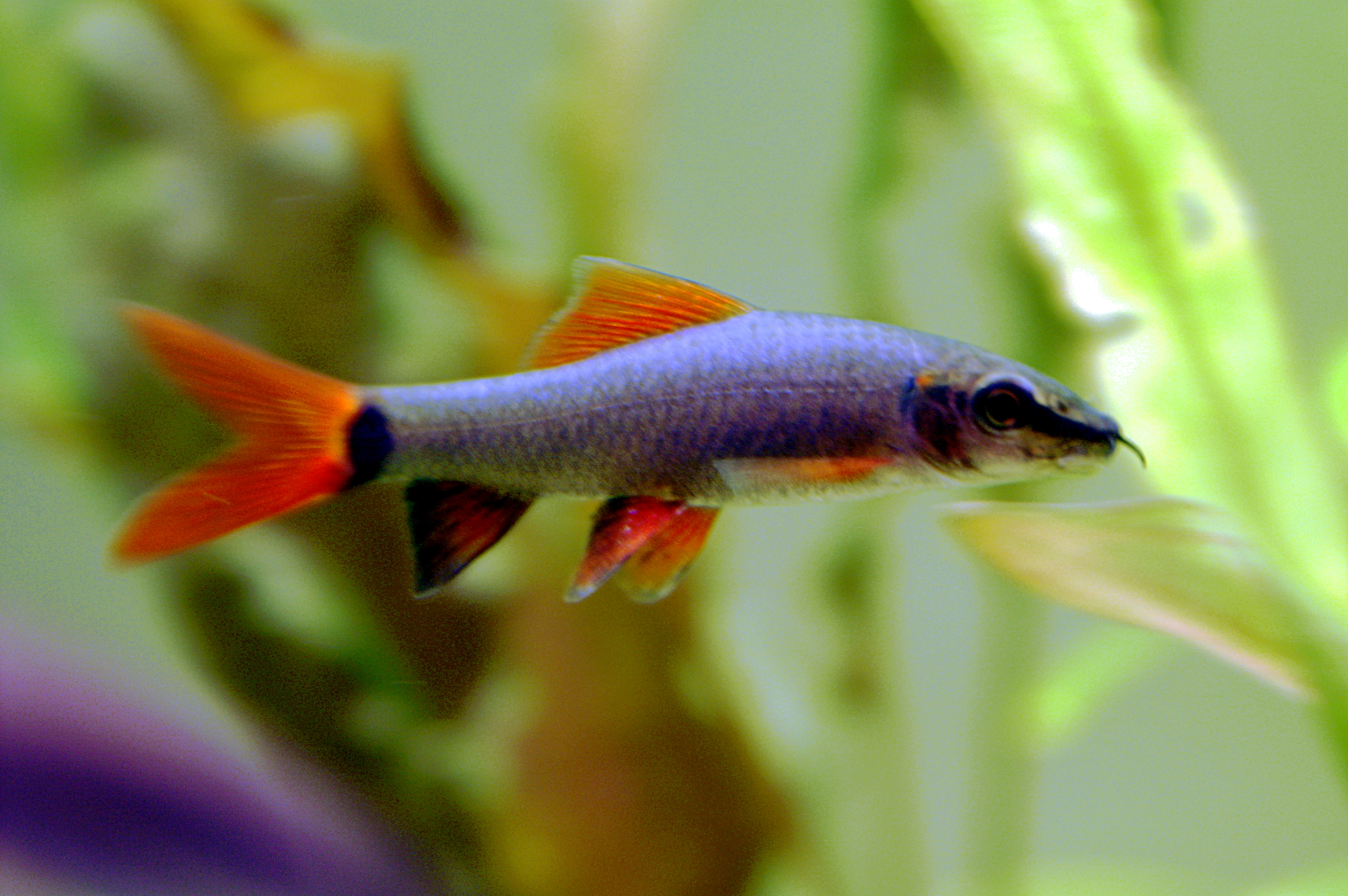

Conservation status
- Least Concern (IUCN 3.1)

Scientific classification
- Kingdom: Animalia
- Phylum: Chordata
- Class: Actinopterygii
- Order: Cypriniformes
- Family: Cyprinidae
- Genus: Epalzeorhynchos
- Species: E. frenatum

Binomial name
- Epalzeorhynchos frenatum (Fowler, 1934)

Synonyms
- Labeo frenatus Fowler, 1934; Labeo erythrura Fowler, 1937

= Rainbow shark =

Species of fish

The rainbow shark (Epalzeorhynchos frenatum) is a species of Southeast Asian freshwater fish from the family Cyprinidae. It is also known as the ruby shark, red-fin shark, red-finned shark, rainbow sharkminnow, green fringelip labeo, whitefin shark and whitetail sharkminnow. It is a popular, semi-aggressive aquarium fish. Unlike true sharks, which belong to the Chondrichthyes ("cartilagenous fishes") lineage, the rainbow shark is an actinopterygiian ("ray-finned fish").

== Distribution and habitat ==
Rainbow sharks are native to the basins of Mekong, Chao Phraya, Xe Bangfai and Maeklong in Indochina.

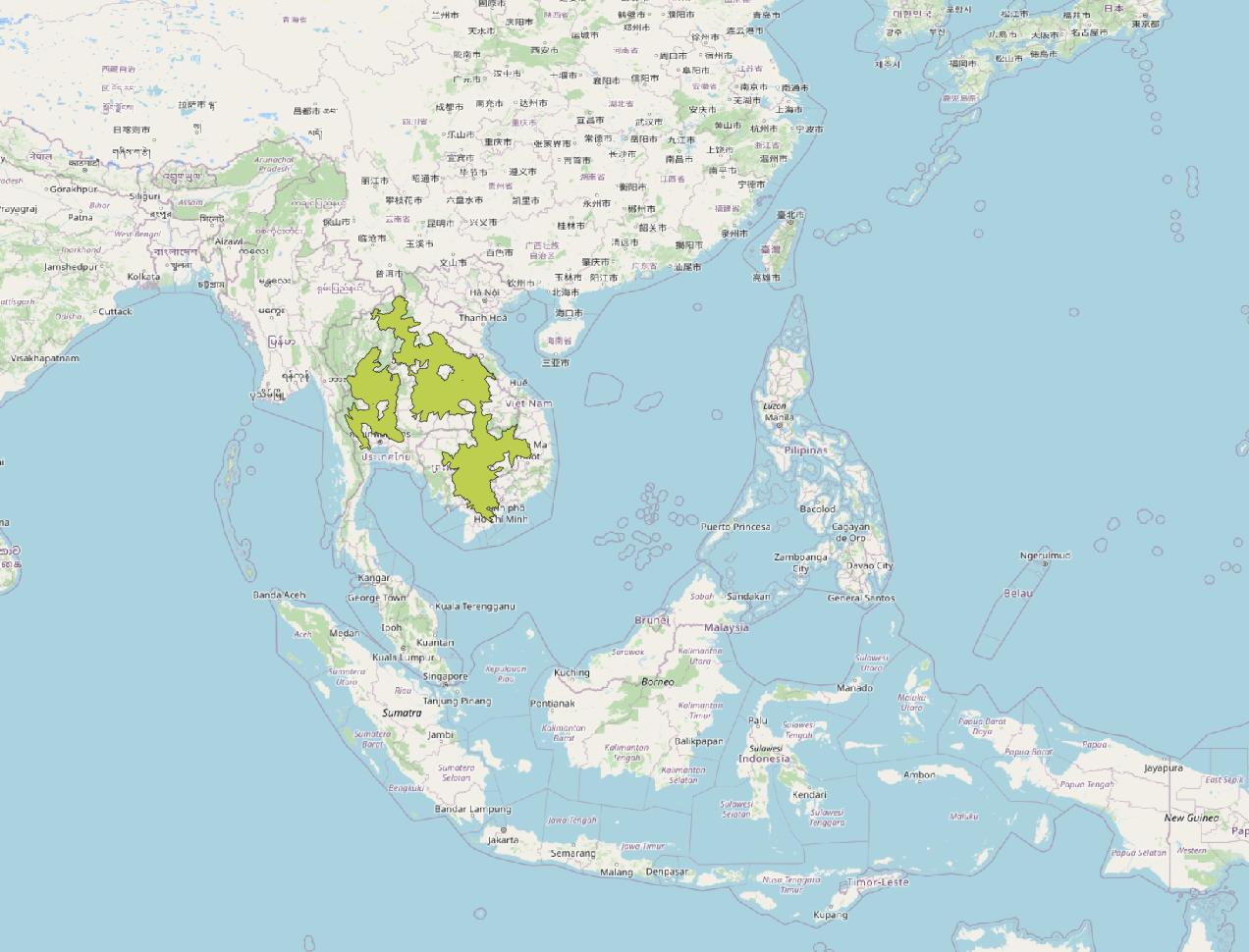
Distribution map of Epalzeorhynchos frenatum according to IUCN (2025)

They live in water with sandy substrates, near the river bottom. This species feeds on algae and plankton, and seasonally migrates into flooded areas, then recedes back to the rivers as the floods dry up.

== Description ==
The rainbow shark has an elongated black, dark blue or bright blue body. The snout is pointed. The abdominal area is flat. The fins possess red to orange-red coloration. The linear area from the gill cover, the eye, and the mouth has a characteristic brief stripe. Compared to females, male rainbow sharks have thinner bodies with black lines along the tailfins. Males also have brighter coloration. They can grow up to about 6 in (15 cm) long.

=== Variants ===
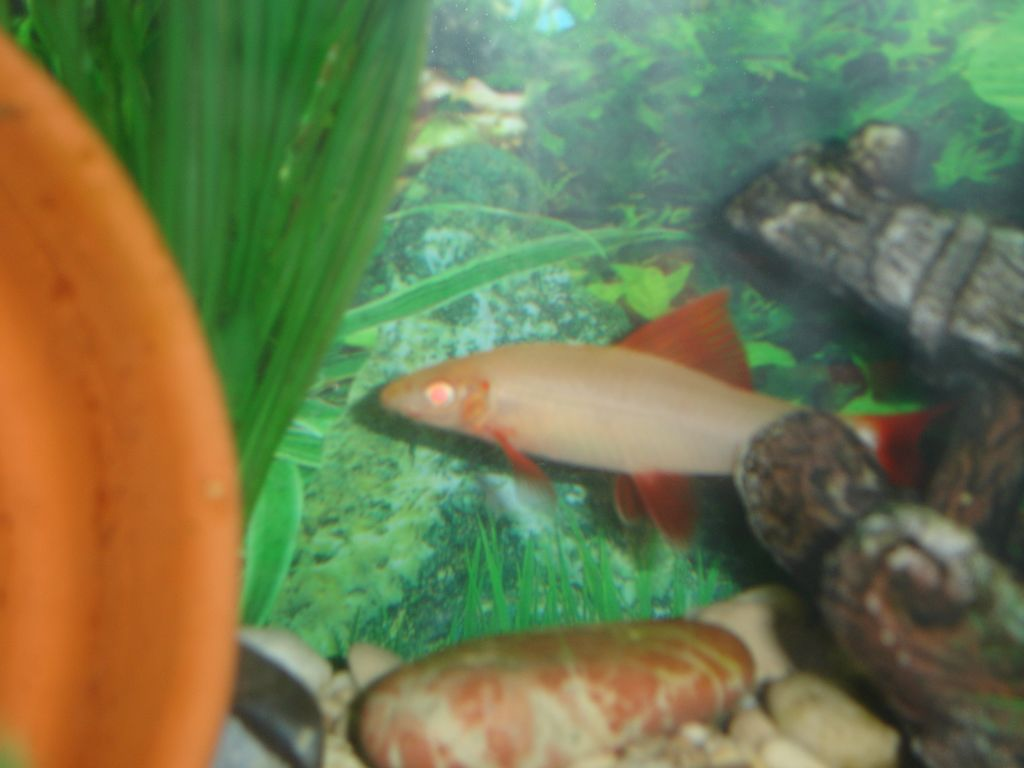
An Albino Rainbow Shark in Aquarium

The albino red-fin shark or albino rainbow sharkminnow is a variety of rainbow shark with a white body and red/orange fins. It closely resembles "normal" rainbow sharks in temperament and appearance, thus they share the same common names in the aquarium industry. These have sometimes been referred to as E. munense, but that is a separate species that rarely enters the aquarium trade. The rainbow shark is also one of the types of genetically modified, fluorescent fish known as GloFish.

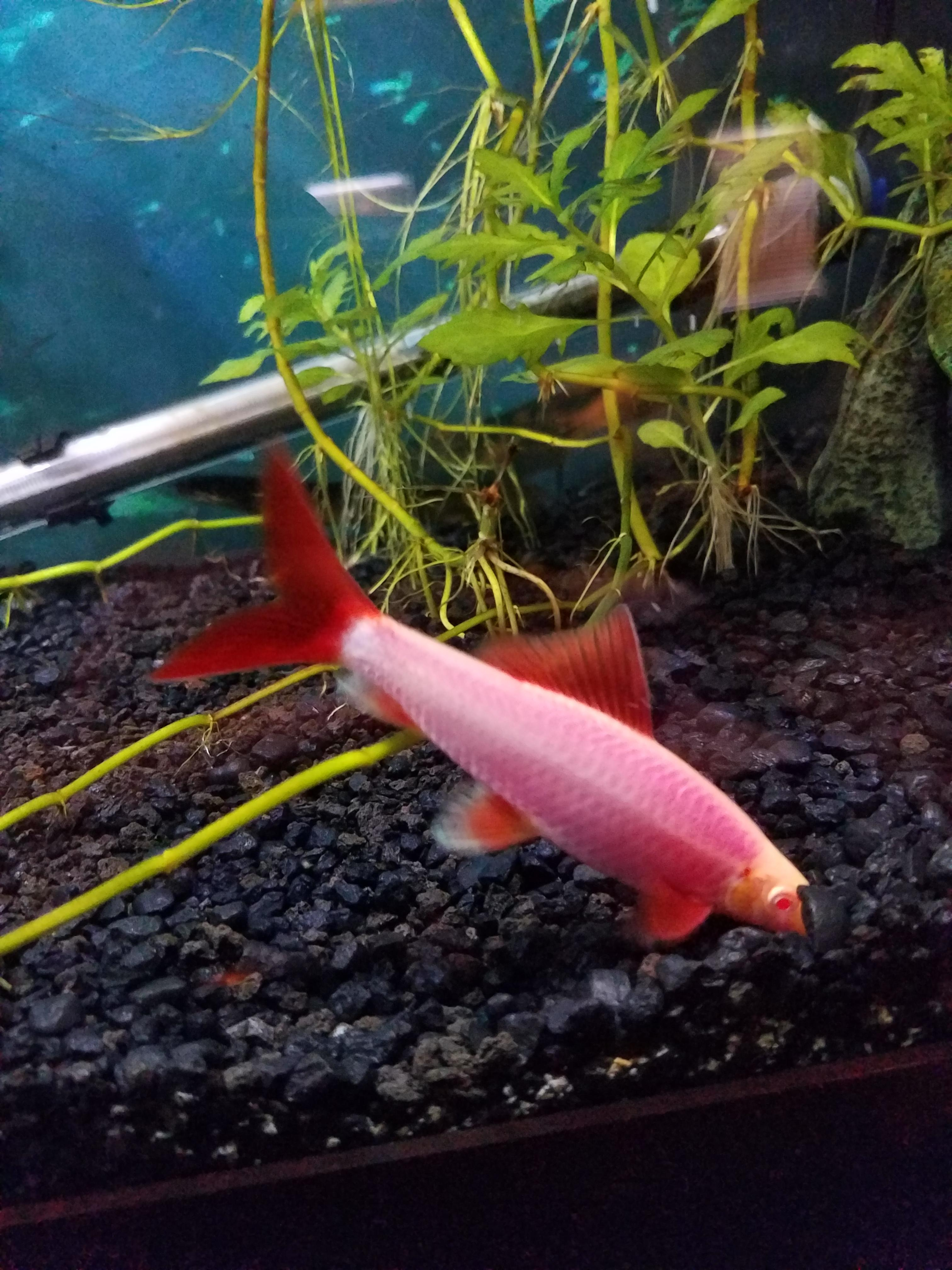
Glofish shark purple

== In the aquarium ==
=== Behavior ===
Rainbow sharks are tank-bottom and aquarium-surface cleaners. Being bottom- and mid-level dwellers, they consume leftover fish food, but also eat the algae growing off surfaces. They are generally peaceful with their own kind in the wild, but they can become aggressive with each other if kept in a tank. Threat displays and fighting are likely to occur. This fighting behavior involves head-and-tail butting, and also biting.. A large rainbow shark will continuously chase a smaller one until the smaller one dies, or chase other fish out of its territory, especially in confined environments like aquaria. It may also increase the risk of the fish jumping out of its tank. This makes breeding difficult. The provision of hiding places and hollowed decors such as plants or artificial cave-like and tunnel-like aquatic ornaments minimize this typical behavior. Due to this behavioral characteristic among its own kind, rainbow sharks are not recommendable to the new aquarist. Keeping them with relatives, such as red-tailed sharks, bala sharks and black sharks should be avoided, as they will chase and attack them as well.

=== Tank requirements ===
Recommended conditions in the aquarium.
Tank size	200 litres (50 gallons)
Water Temperature	24–27 °C
Water salinity	Freshwater (0 ppt)
Temperament	Juveniles are peaceful, adults are territorial and are aggressive towards similarly-shaped fish
Diet	Omnivorous
Water hardness	5 – 11 dH
pH	6–8

An adult rainbow shark thrives in a minimum of 55 gallons of water, with an aquarium length of 48 inches, at the neutral pH range (6 to 8 pH), with temperatures between 24 and 27 °C (75 and 81 °F), and water hardness maintained at 5 to 11 dH. They must have this much space, as they frequently swim around quickly and will terrorize other fish in any tank under this size.

=== Compatibility ===
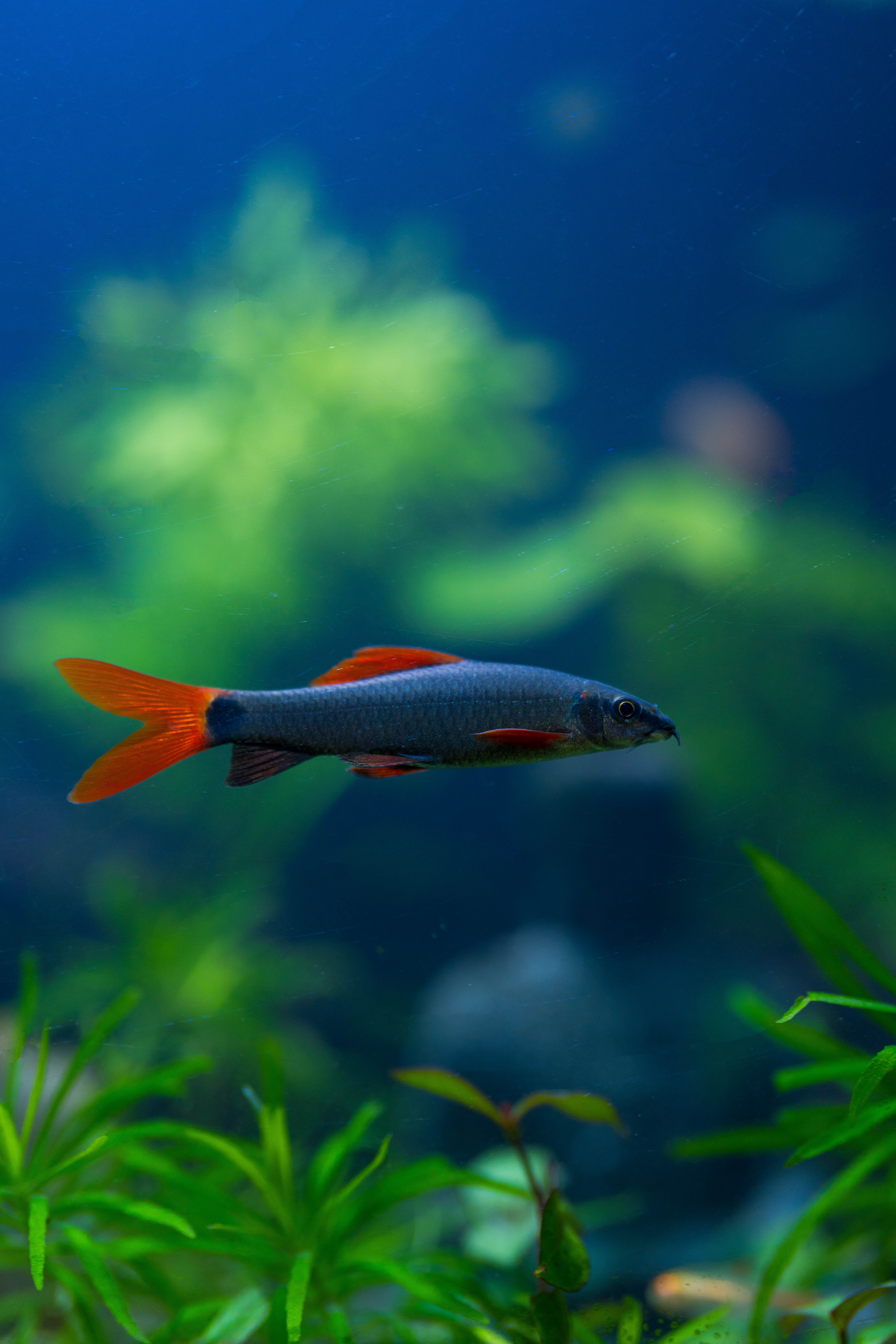
Rainbow Sharks are good aquarium fishes due to their cleaning ablities

Rainbow sharks are compatible with barbs and rainbowfish, which are upper- and middle-tank dwellers. They can also live with danios, loaches, plecos, rasboras, and gouramis. They can be housed with some species of larger freshwater shrimp although any fry or eggs might get eaten by the shark. They are not compatible with smaller, more timid fish in the tank, as the sharks may terrorize them by chasing them from their territory.

=== Diet ===
Rainbow sharks are omnivores that in captivity primarily consume algae in the form of flakes, but also live foods such as insect larvae, tubifex worms, periphyton, crustaceans, phytoplankton, zooplankton and aquatic insects, and lettuce and spinach. They will also eat frozen bloodworms and brine shrimp.

=== Breeding ===
No actual breed sequence has been documented in an aquarium setting. Although known to be egg-layers, reproduction of rainbow sharks is difficult in an aquarium setting. Large numbers are bred in southeast Asian commercial farms.
