= Crossocheilus elegans =

Scientific classification
- Kingdom: Animalia
- Phylum: Chordata
- Class: Actinopterygii
- Order: Cypriniformes
- Family: Cyprinidae
- Subfamily: Labeoninae
- Genus: Crossocheilus
- Species: C. elegans

Binomial name
- Crossocheilus elegans Kottelat & H. H. Tan, 2011

Species of fish

Crossocheilus elegans is a fish species in the genus Crossocheilus from northern Borneo, Indonesia. Its distribution is the Segama and Kinabatangan River drainages in Sabah, Malaysia.
