= Crossocheilus microstoma =

Scientific classification
- Kingdom: Animalia
- Phylum: Chordata
- Class: Actinopterygii
- Order: Cypriniformes
- Family: Cyprinidae
- Genus: Crossocheilus
- Species: C. microstoma

Binomial name
- Crossocheilus microstoma Ciccotto & Page, 2017

Species of fish

Crossocheilus latius, also known as the smallmouth fringe barb, is a species of ray-finned fish in the genus Crossocheilus. It is endemic to the Kapuas basin, West Kalimantan on Borneo.
