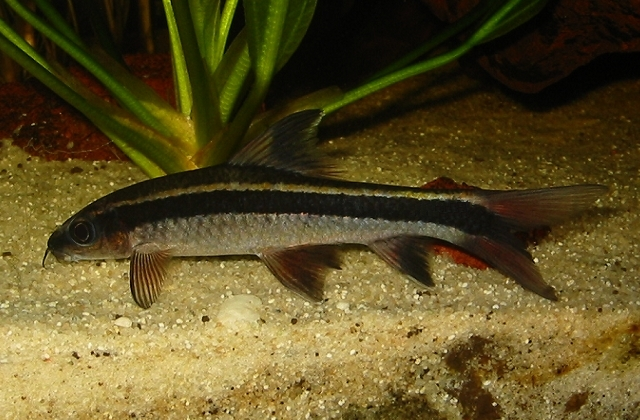

Conservation status
- Least Concern (IUCN 3.1)

Scientific classification
- Kingdom: Animalia
- Phylum: Chordata
- Class: Actinopterygii
- Order: Cypriniformes
- Family: Cyprinidae
- Genus: Epalzeorhynchos
- Species: E. kalopterus

Binomial name
- Epalzeorhynchos kalopterus (Bleeker, 1850)

Synonyms
- Barbus kalopterus Bleeker, 1850

= Flying fox (fish) =

Species of fish

The flying fox (Epalzeorhynchos kalopterus) is a Southeast Asian species of freshwater fish in the family Cyprinidae. It is commonly kept in the aquarium trade. Among other foods, it is known to eat green algae.

== Description ==
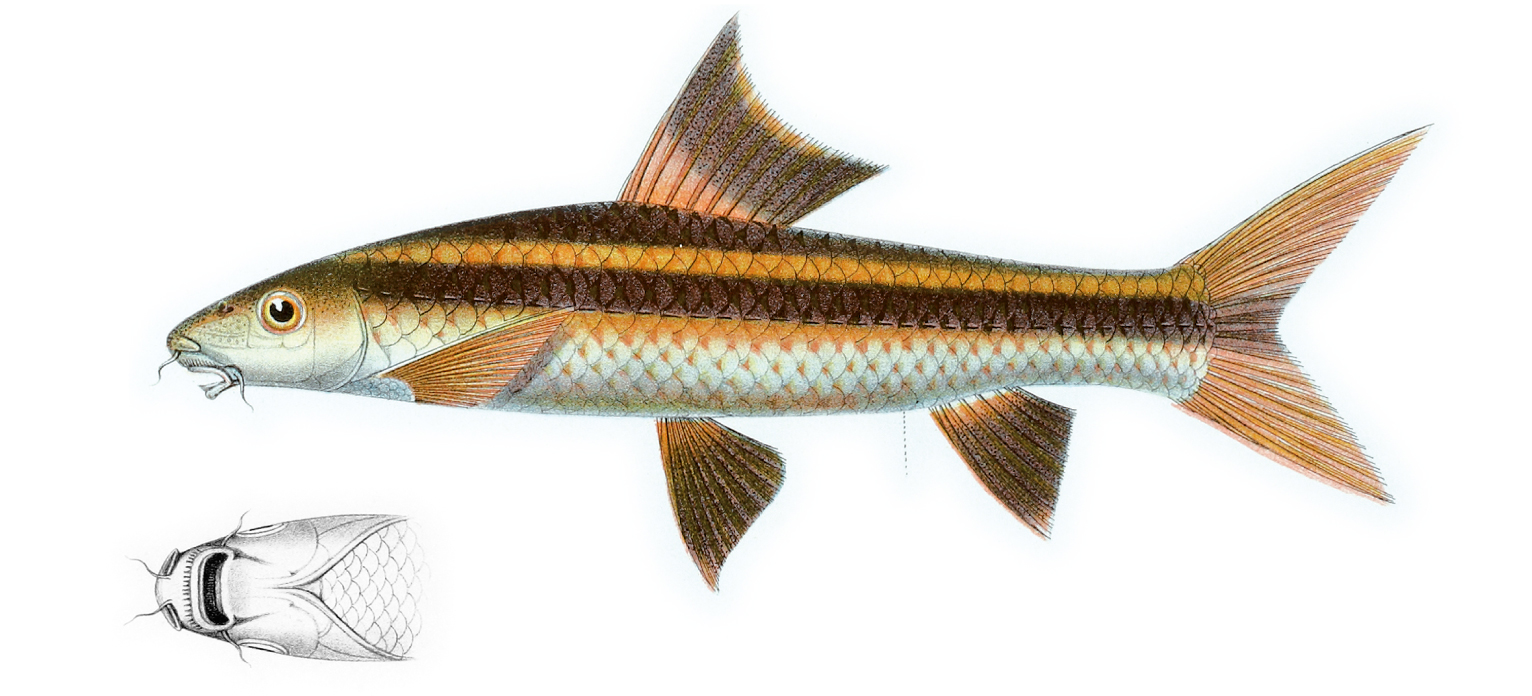
illustration of a Flying fox by Pieter Bleeker

The flying fox fish has a characteristic long body with a flat abdominal area. Its dorsal area has a coloration ranging from olive to dark brown. The lower half of its body has a yellowish white hue. A brownish-black line runs from its mouth to the caudal fin. On top of this distinctive black line is a gold-colored stripe. The eyes of a flying fox may have a reddish iris. Its dorsal, anal and ventral fins consist of a transparent front with a thick black band along the edge.

Although capable of reaching up to 6 inches (15.24 cm), flying foxes have an average length of 4.7 inches (11.94 cm) and are frequent victims of stunting in the aquarium setting.

== Distribution and habitat ==
The flying fox is a bottom-dweller that is native to the fast-flowing foothill rivers and streams of the Thai-Malay Peninsula, Borneo, Java and Sumatra in Southeast Asia.

== Captivity ==
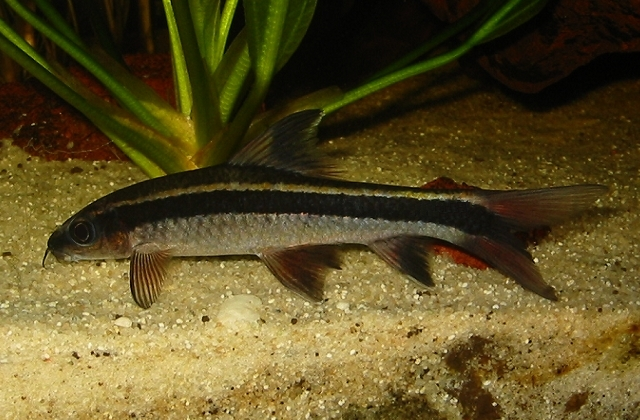
Flying fox in an aquarium

=== Tank requirements ===
A 40-gallon or larger breeder tank lined with fine gravel or sand substrate is suitable for an average-sized flying fox fish. Being bottom-dwellers, the aquarium for flying foxes usually has broad-leaved plants, rocks, and driftwood to serve as hiding places. Because the flying fox is a known algae-eater, adequate lighting is preferred. Flying foxes can survive in aquarium water that has a pH of 6 to 7.5, a water hardness ranging from 2 to 12 dH, and temperatures kept at 23 to 27 °C (73 to 81 °F).

=== Behavior ===
Flying foxes are generally compatible with acaras, angelfish, barbs, danios, eartheaters, gouramis, knifefish, loaches, tetras and rasboras. Aquarists may keep these fish alone or in schools; however, a flying foxes may exhibit territorial behavior when housed with other flying foxes.

=== Life span ===
In the aquarium, flying foxes may live from eight to ten years.

=== Diet ===
Mainly algae eaters, flying foxes also eat flakes, wafers and tablets. Vegetables such as spinach, zucchini and lettuce, as well as live planarians, tubifex worms, crustaceans and other aquatic insects, are excellent staples for these omnivores. They do not consume red algae.

=== Breeding ===
Sex among flying foxes is difficult to determine, though as with most fish, mature females tend to be plumper and males more slender. Flying foxes are not known to breed in captivity.
