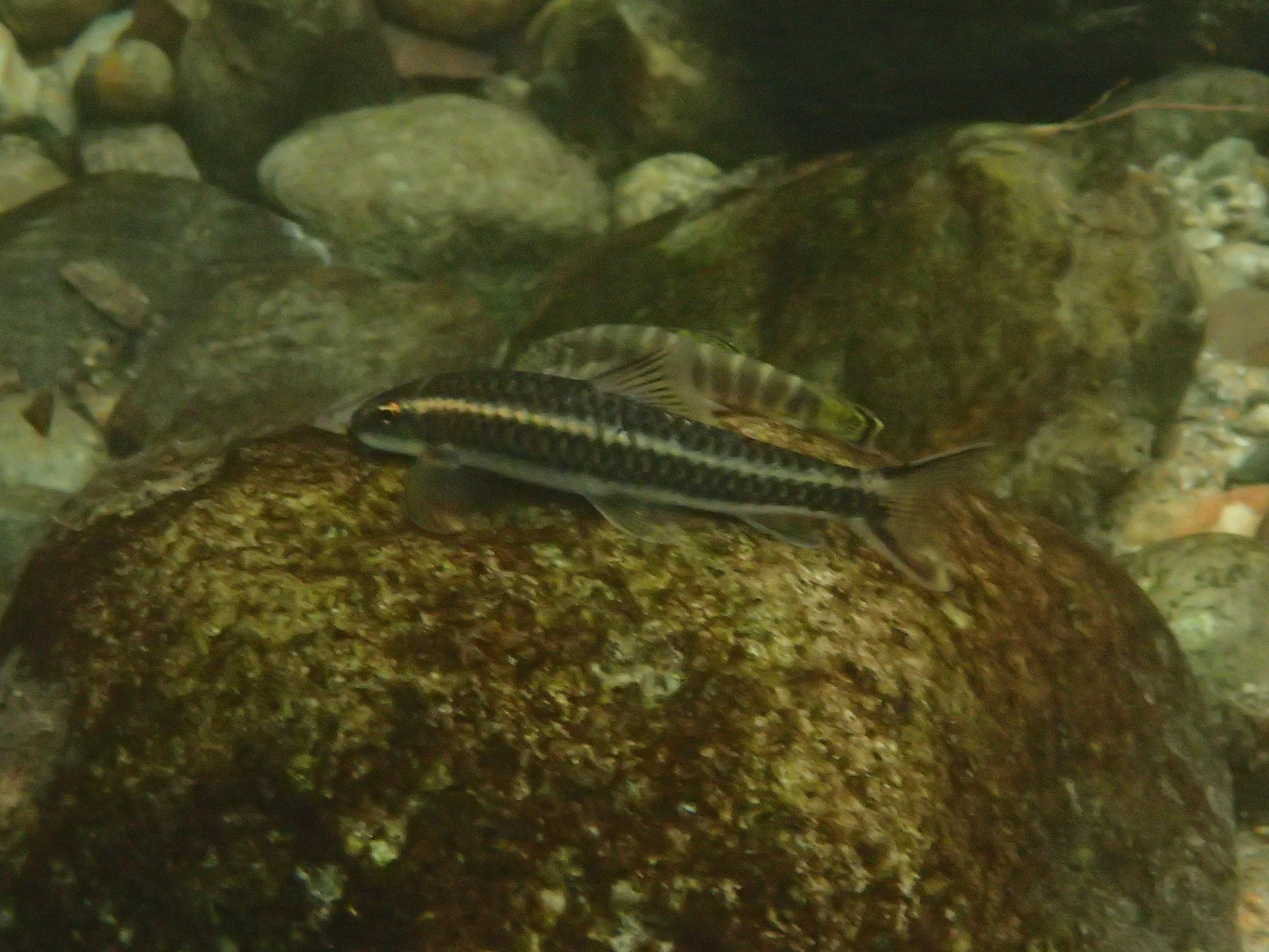

Conservation status
- Least Concern (IUCN 3.1)

Scientific classification
- Kingdom: Animalia
- Phylum: Chordata
- Class: Actinopterygii
- Order: Cypriniformes
- Family: Cyprinidae
- Genus: Paracrossochilus
- Species: P. vittatus

Binomial name
- Paracrossochilus vittatus (Boulenger, 1894)

Synonyms
- Crossochilus vittatus Boulenger, 1894; Paracrossochilus bicornis Popta, 1904

= Paracrossochilus vittatus =

Species of fish

Paracrossochilus vittatus is a species of freshwater ray-finned fish belonging to the family Cyprinidae, the family which includes the carps, barbs, minnows and related fishes. This fish is endemic to the island of Borneo where it occurs in the drainage systems running off its central mountain range including the Kapuas, Mahakam, Barito and Kusan in Kalimantan, the Rajang drainage in Sarawak and the Temburong basin in Brunei. This species is found in fast flowing, clear waters over stony or gravely riverbeds.
