= Epalzeorhynchos munense =

Conservation status
- Vulnerable (IUCN 3.1)

Scientific classification
- Domain: Eukaryota
- Kingdom: Animalia
- Phylum: Chordata
- Class: Actinopterygii
- Order: Cypriniformes
- Family: Cyprinidae
- Genus: Epalzeorhynchos
- Species: E. munense

Binomial name
- Epalzeorhynchos munense (H. M. Smith, 1934)

Synonyms
- Labeo munensis Smith, 1934

Species of fish

Epalzeorhynchos munense, also known as the redfin shark, is a species of cyprinid fish found in the Mekong, Chao Phraya and Mae Klong rivers basins in Indochina. It resembles the rainbow shark (E. frenatum) and the two have frequently been confused (the name red fin shark has been used for both). Unlike other Epalzeorhynchos species, E. munense is believed to be rare in the aquarium trade and is not known to be bred in commercial farms.
