= Crossocheilus tchangi =

Scientific classification
- Kingdom: Animalia
- Phylum: Chordata
- Class: Actinopterygii
- Order: Cypriniformes
- Family: Cyprinidae
- Genus: Crossocheilus
- Species: C. tchangi

Binomial name
- Crossocheilus tchangi Fowler, 1935

Species of fish

Crossocheilus tchangi is a species of freshwater ray-finned fish belonging to the family Cyprinidae, the carps, barbs, minnows and related fishes. This species is endemic to Thailand where it is found in the Chao Praya, Mae Klong, Bangpakong, Tapi and Trang basins.
