= Crossocheilus nigriloba =

Conservation status
- Least Concern (IUCN 3.1)

Scientific classification
- Kingdom: Animalia
- Phylum: Chordata
- Class: Actinopterygii
- Order: Cypriniformes
- Family: Cyprinidae
- Genus: Crossocheilus
- Species: C. nigriloba

Binomial name
- Crossocheilus nigriloba Popta, 1904

Synonyms
- Crossocheilus oblongus nigriloba; Crossochilus oblongus nigriloba

Species of fish

Crossocheilus nigriloba is a species of ray-finned fish in the genus Crossocheilus. It is native to eastern Borneo.
