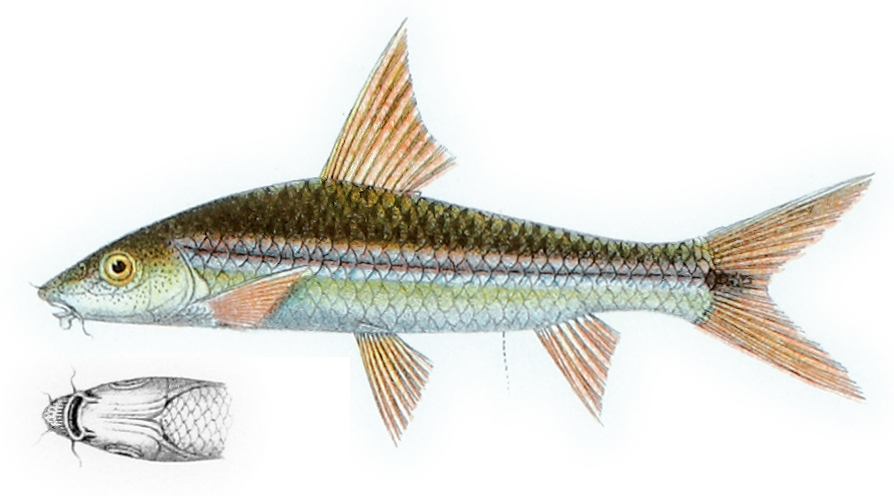

Scientific classification
- Kingdom: Animalia
- Phylum: Chordata
- Class: Actinopterygii
- Order: Cypriniformes
- Family: Cyprinidae
- Genus: Crossocheilus
- Species: C. cobitis

Binomial name
- Crossocheilus cobitis (Bleeker, 1854)

Synonyms
- Crossocheilos cobitis; Crossocheilus kalliurus; Crossochilus cobitis; Epalzeorhynchos kalliurus; Lobocheilos cobitis

= Crossocheilus cobitis =

Species of fish

Crossocheilus cobitis is a species of ray-finned fish in the genus Crossocheilus. It is native to the Mekong basin and Indonesia and Malaysia.
