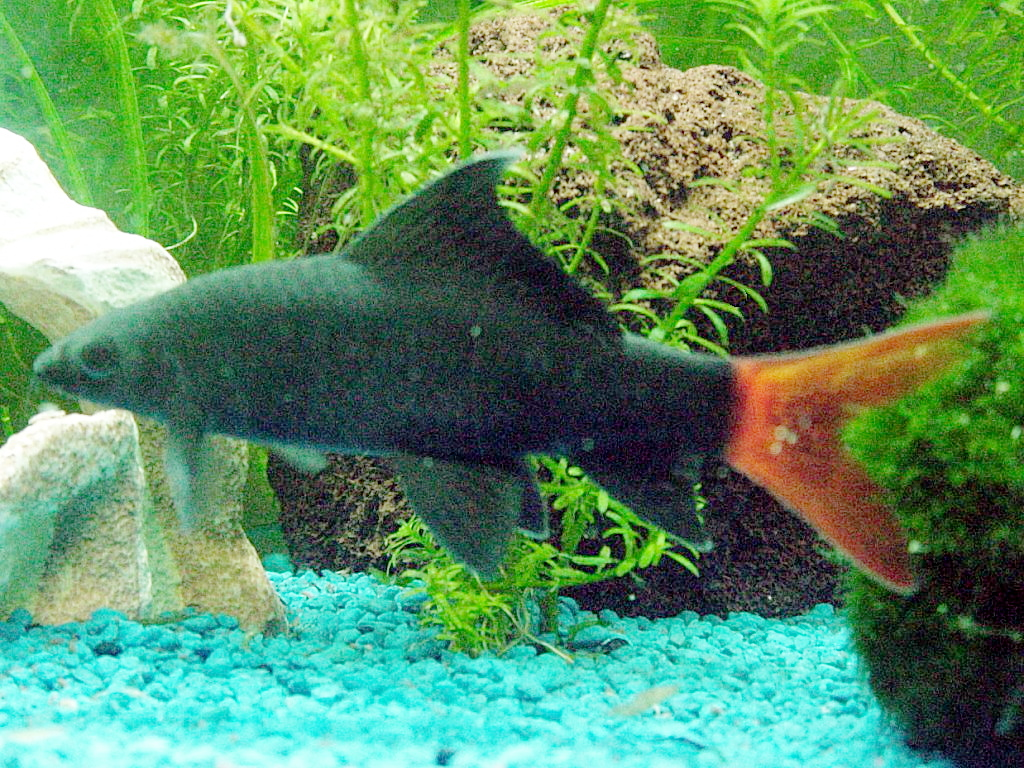
- The red-tailed black shark (E. bicolor)

Scientific classification
- Kingdom: Animalia
- Phylum: Chordata
- Class: Actinopterygii
- Order: Cypriniformes
- Family: Cyprinidae
- Subfamily: Labeoninae
- Genus: Epalzeorhynchos; Bleeker, 1855

Type species
- Barbus kalopterus Bleeker, 1851

Diversity
- 4 species

= Epalzeorhynchos =

Genus of fishes

Epalzeorhynchos is a small ray-finned fish genus of the family Cyprinidae. Its members are – like some other cyprinids – known as "freshwater sharks" or simply "sharks". They are, however, freshwater members of the Osteichthyes lineage which is distinct from the Chondrichthyes lineage of sharks. The description of these animals as "shark" is most likely a reference to the shark-like shape of these popular cyprinids.

The genus Epalzeorhynchos may be placed in the tribe Garrini of the Labeoninae, or in subtribe Garraina of tribe Labeonini, if these are considered a tribe of subfamily Cyprininae. It is not yet resolved which is a more appropriate representation of their phylogeny.

== Description and ecology ==
In size and shape Epalzeorhynchos generally resemble the Indian loaches (Botia), which, although they are also cypriniforms, are far too distantly related to have anything other than parallel or even convergent evolution be responsible for this similarity. Alternatively, Epalzeorhynchos might be considered a plumper version of Crossocheilus, which includes the well-known Siamese algae eater (C. siamensis) and is a very close relative. Their coloration is also reminiscent of some Crossocheilus, or of the Mekong loaches (Yasuhikotakia), depending on the particular Epalzeorhynchos species.

Unlike actual sharks, Epalzeorhynchos "freshwater sharks" are Osteichthyes. Thus, they have gill covers that can actively pump water over the gills, enabling them to breathe comfortably while at rest. As typical for Garrini, they spend much time on or near the ground – though not quite as much as the related true gudgeons of the Gobioninae or the loaches of the cypriniform superfamily Cobitoidea. Still, they usually only move for prolonged distances during migration to their spawning grounds.

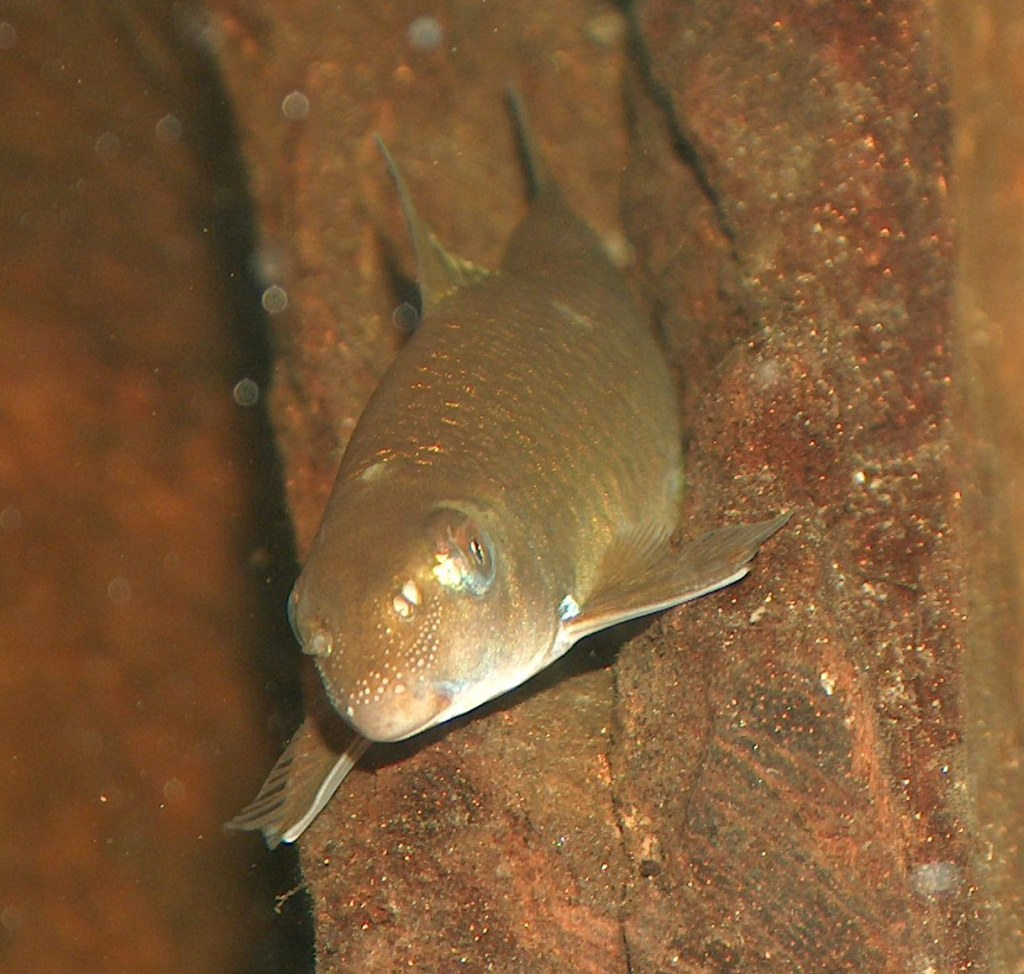
Flying fox seen head-on Note lack of prominent lip-cushions or frills

This genus feeds mainly on aufwuchs, detritus and small invertebrate and plant matter. Their mouthparts are not as apomorphic as that of many other Garrini; they do not have a pronounced rostral cap, but in addition to the two barbels on the rostrum they retain another pair of barbels at the rear edges of the lower maxilla. The upper lip carries a short bristly ridge, while the lower one has a sizeable hard edge with which they can scrape food off hard substrate like rocks or logs.

Three species are frequent in the aquarium fish trade; E. munense is the only member of the genus that rarely (if ever) makes its way into the trade. The demand for these colourful fishes is high, and breeding is almost impossible to achieve in the home aquarium. The popular species are thus bred on an industrial scale in Southeast Asia. Today all red-tailed black sharks (E. bicolor), all flying foxes (E. kalopterus), and most rainbow sharks (E. frenatum) seen in the aquarium trade are believed to be farm-bred. The main problem for their status is damming of rivers between the fishes' usual haunts and the breeding grounds. While otherwise a considerable take of wild Epalzeorhynchus could be sustained, dams will literally stand in the way of successful reproduction, and such isolated subpopulations are easily extinguished by overfishing. Water pollution is also problematic. Due to these threats, the red-tailed black shark is very rare and was believed to be extinct in the wild, but a tiny wild population is now known, leading to its current IUCN rating as critically endangered. Among the remaining, E. munense is vulnerable, the rainbow shark is considered safe, and the flying fox is data deficient (its status is unclear based on 2009 knowledge).

== Species ==
A mere four species are placed in this genus:

- Epalzeorhynchos bicolor (H. M. Smith, 1931) (red-tailed black shark, redtail shark, red-tailed labeo, redtail sharkminnow)
- Epalzeorhynchos frenatum (Fowler, 1934) (rainbow shark, rainbow sharkminnow)
- Epalzeorhynchos kalopterus (Bleeker, 1851) (flying fox)
- Epalzeorhynchos munense (H. M. Smith, 1934) (redfin shark)

In addition to these, Akrokolioplax bicornis was included in Epalzeorhynchos until 2006.
