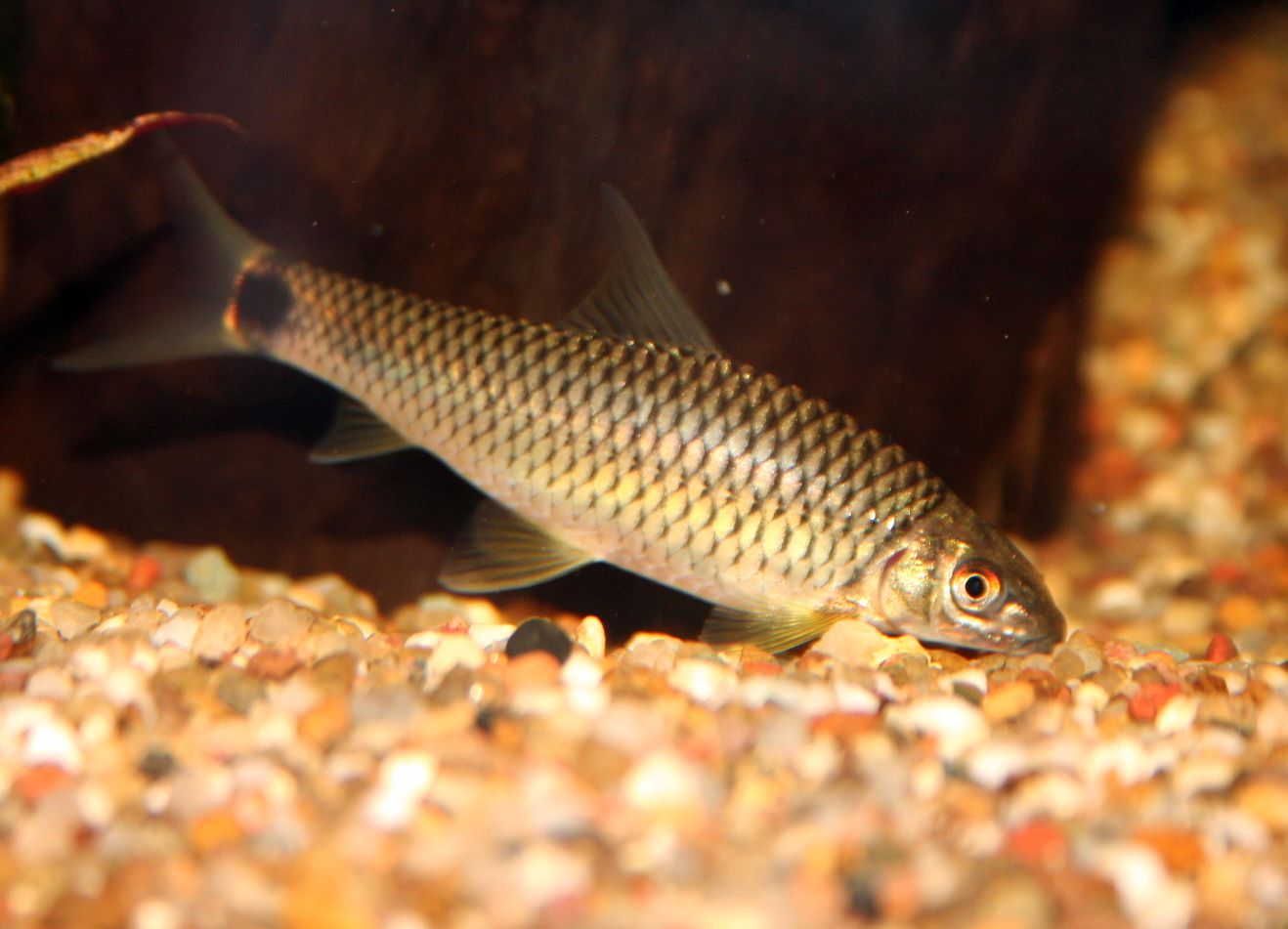

Conservation status
- Least Concern (IUCN 3.1)

Scientific classification
- Domain: Eukaryota
- Kingdom: Animalia
- Phylum: Chordata
- Class: Actinopterygii
- Order: Cypriniformes
- Family: Cyprinidae
- Subfamily: Labeoninae
- Genus: Crossocheilus
- Species: C. reticulatus

Binomial name
- Crossocheilus reticulatus (Fowler, 1934)

Synonyms
- Holotylognathus reticulatus Fowler, 1934; Crossocheilus reticulatus Fowler, 1935; Crossocheilus tchangi Fowler, 1935; Tylognathus coatesi Fowler, 1937; Epalzeorhynchos coatesi (Fowler, 1937)

= Crossocheilus reticulatus =

Species of fish

Crossocheilus reticulatus (silver flying fox) is a freshwater fish in the family Cyprinidae from Southeast Asia. It grows to 17 cm (6.7 in) standard length.

== Habitat ==
Crossocheilus reticulatus lives in clear, flowing waters over a variety of substrates.

== Distribution ==
It is found in the Mekong River in Yunnan (China), Laos, Thailand, Cambodia, and Vietnam, and in the Chao Phraya River and Mae Klong River in Thailand.

== Utilization ==
Crossocheilus reticulatus is an important fishery species, both in subsistence and commercial fisheries, in the Mekong basin. It is also collected for aquarium fish trade.
