= Crossocheilus obscurus =

Conservation status
- Data Deficient (IUCN 3.1)

Scientific classification
- Kingdom: Animalia
- Phylum: Chordata
- Class: Actinopterygii
- Order: Cypriniformes
- Family: Cyprinidae
- Subfamily: Labeoninae
- Genus: Crossocheilus
- Species: C. obscurus

Binomial name
- Crossocheilus obscurus H. H. Tan & Kottelat, 2009

Species of fish

Crossocheilus obscurus is a species cyprinid fish. It occurs on Sumatra (Indonesia) and in Peninsular Malaysia. It lives in fast flowing steams with rocky substrate.

Crossocheilus obscurus grows to 13.9 cm (5.5 in) standard length.
