= Crossocheilus gnathopogon =

Scientific classification
- Kingdom: Animalia
- Phylum: Chordata
- Class: Actinopterygii
- Order: Cypriniformes
- Family: Cyprinidae
- Genus: Crossocheilus
- Species: C. gnathopogon

Binomial name
- Crossocheilus gnathopogon Weber & de Beaufort, 1916

Synonyms
- Crossochilus gnathopogon

Species of fish

Crossocheilus gnathopogon is a species of ray-finned fish in the genus Crossocheilus. It is native to Sumatra.
