= GloFish =

Brand of genetically modified fluorescent fish

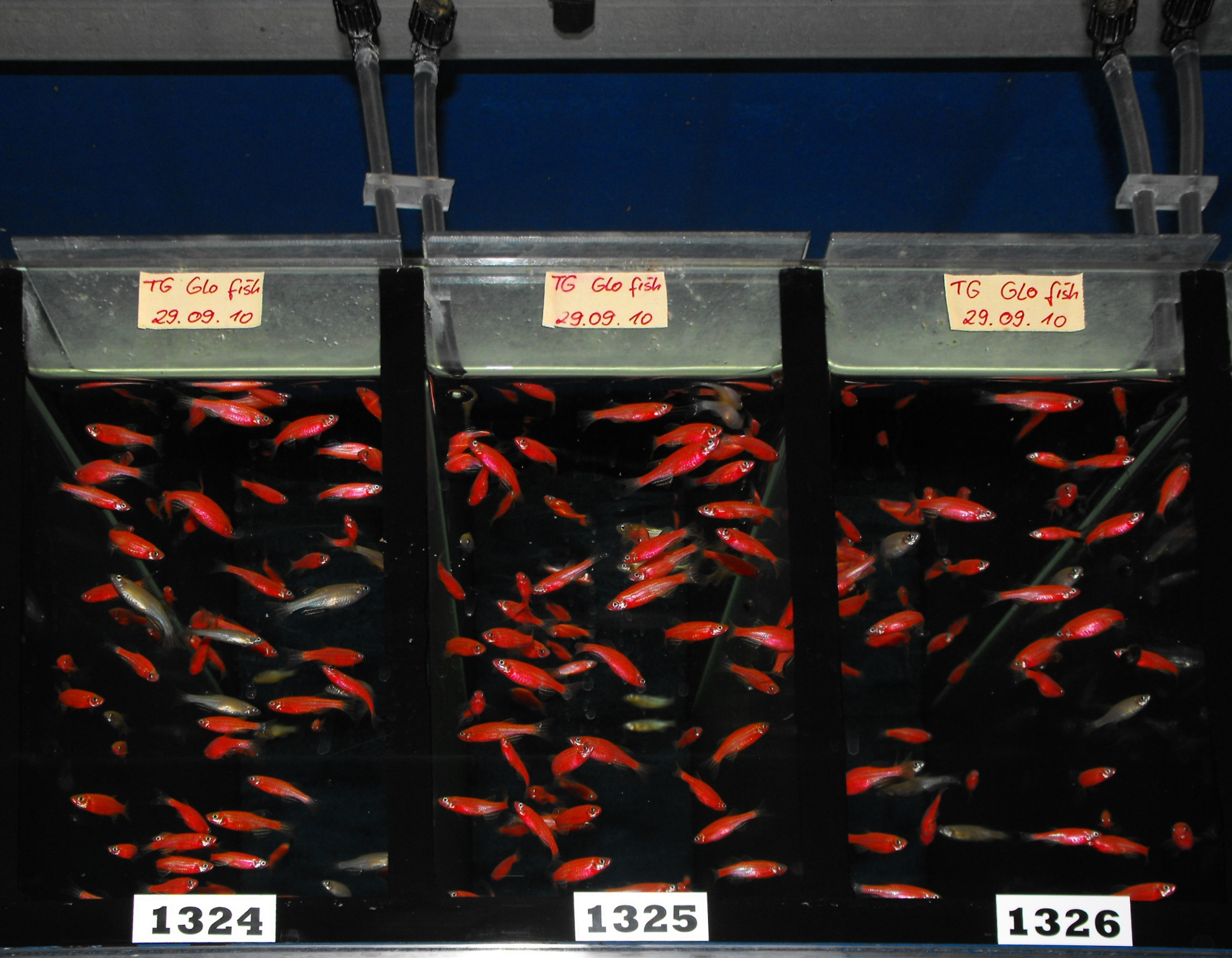
- Organism: Betta splendens; Corydoras aeneus; Danio rerio; Epalzeorhynchos frenatum; Gymnocorymbus ternetzi; Pristella maxillaris; Pterophyllum scalare; Puntius tetrazona
- Mode: Transgenesis
- Method: Insertion
- Vector: Multiple including green fluorescent protein
- Developer: Yorktown Technologies, L.P.
- Trait(s) conferred: Fluorescent colors
- Genes introduced: Multiple

The GloFish is a patented and trademarked brand of fluorescently colored genetically modified aquarium fish. They have been created from several different species of fish: zebrafish were the first GloFish available in pet stores, followed by black tetras, tiger barbs, rainbow sharks, Siamese fighting fish, X-ray tetras, bronze corydoras, and freshwater angelfish. They are sold in many colors, trademarked as "Starfire Red", "Moonrise Pink", "Sunburst Orange", "Electric Green", "Cosmic Blue", and "Galactic Purple", although not all species are available in all colors. Although not originally developed for the ornamental fish trade, it is one of the first genetically modified animals to become publicly available. The rights to GloFish are owned by Spectrum Brands, Inc., which purchased GloFish from Yorktown Technologies, the original developer of GloFish, in May 2017.

== History ==
=== Early development ===
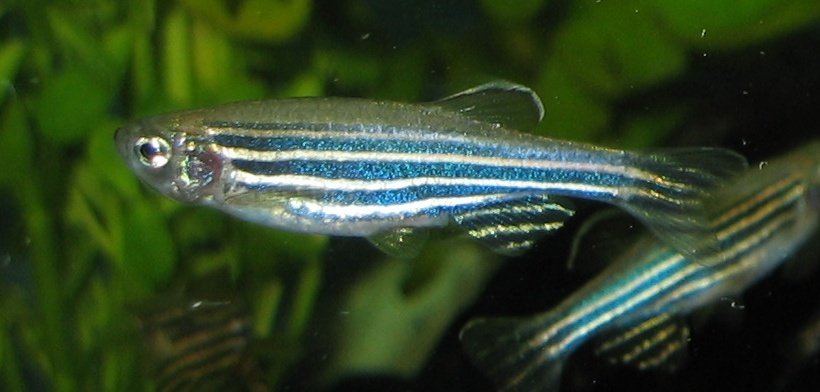
An ordinary zebra danio

The original zebrafish (or zebra danio, Danio rerio) is a native of rivers in India and Bangladesh. It measures three centimeters long and has gold and dark blue stripes. In 1999, Dr. Zhiyuan Gong and his colleagues at the National University of Singapore were working with a gene that encodes the green fluorescent protein (GFP), originally extracted from a jellyfish, that naturally produced bright green fluorescence. They inserted the gene into a zebrafish embryo, allowing it to integrate into the zebrafish's genome, which caused the fish to be brightly fluorescent under both natural white light and ultraviolet light. Their goal was to develop a fish that could detect pollution by selectively fluorescing in the presence of environmental toxins. The development of the constantly fluorescing fish was the first step in this process, and the National University of Singapore filed a patent application on this work. Shortly thereafter, his team developed a line of red fluorescent zebra fish by adding a gene from a sea coral, and orange-yellow fluorescent zebra fish, by adding a variant of the jellyfish gene. Later, a team of researchers at the National Taiwan University, headed by Professor Huai-Jen Tsai, succeeded in creating a medaka (rice fish) with a fluorescent green color, which, like the zebrafish, is a model organism used in biology.

The scientists from NUS and businessmen Alan Blake and Richard Crockett from Yorktown Technologies, L.P., a company in Austin, Texas, met and a deal was signed whereby Yorktown obtained the worldwide rights to market the fluorescent zebrafish, which Yorktown subsequently branded as "GloFish". At around the same time, a separate deal was made between Taikong, the largest aquarium fish producer in Taiwan, and the Taiwanese researchers to market the green medaka in Taiwan under the name TK-1. In the spring of 2003, Taiwan became the first to authorize sales of a genetically modified organism as a pet. One hundred thousand fish were reportedly sold in less than a month at US$18.60 each. The fluorescent medaka are not GloFish, as they are not marketed by Yorktown Technologies, but instead by Taikong Corp under a different brand name.

=== Introduction to the United States market ===
GloFish were introduced to the United States market in late 2003 by Yorktown Technologies, after two years of research. The governmental environmental risk assessment was made by the U.S. Food and Drug Administration (FDA), which has jurisdiction over all genetically modified (GM) animals, including fluorescent zebra fish, since they consider the inserted gene to be a drug. The FDA determined in December 2003:

Because tropical aquarium fish are not used for food purposes, they pose no threat to the food supply. There is no evidence that these genetically engineered zebra danio fish pose any more threat to the environment than their unmodified counterparts which have long been widely sold in the United States. In the absence of a clear risk to the public health, the FDA finds no reason to regulate these particular fish.

Marketing of the fish was met by protests from a non-governmental organization called the Center for Food Safety. They were concerned that approval of the GloFish based only on a Food and Drug Administration risk assessment would create a precedent of inadequate scrutiny of biotech animals in general. The group filed a lawsuit in US Federal District Court to block the sale of the GloFish. The lawsuit sought a court order stating that the sale of transgenic fish is subject to federal regulation beyond the FDA's charter, and as such should not be sold without more extensive approvals. In the opinion of Joseph Mendelson, the Center for Food Safety's legal director:

It's clear this sets a precedent for genetically engineered animals. It opens the dams to a whole host of nonfood genetically engineered organisms. That's unacceptable to us and runs counter to things the National Academy of Sciences and other scientific review boards have said, particularly when it comes to mobile GM organisms like fish and insects.

=== Subsequent developments ===
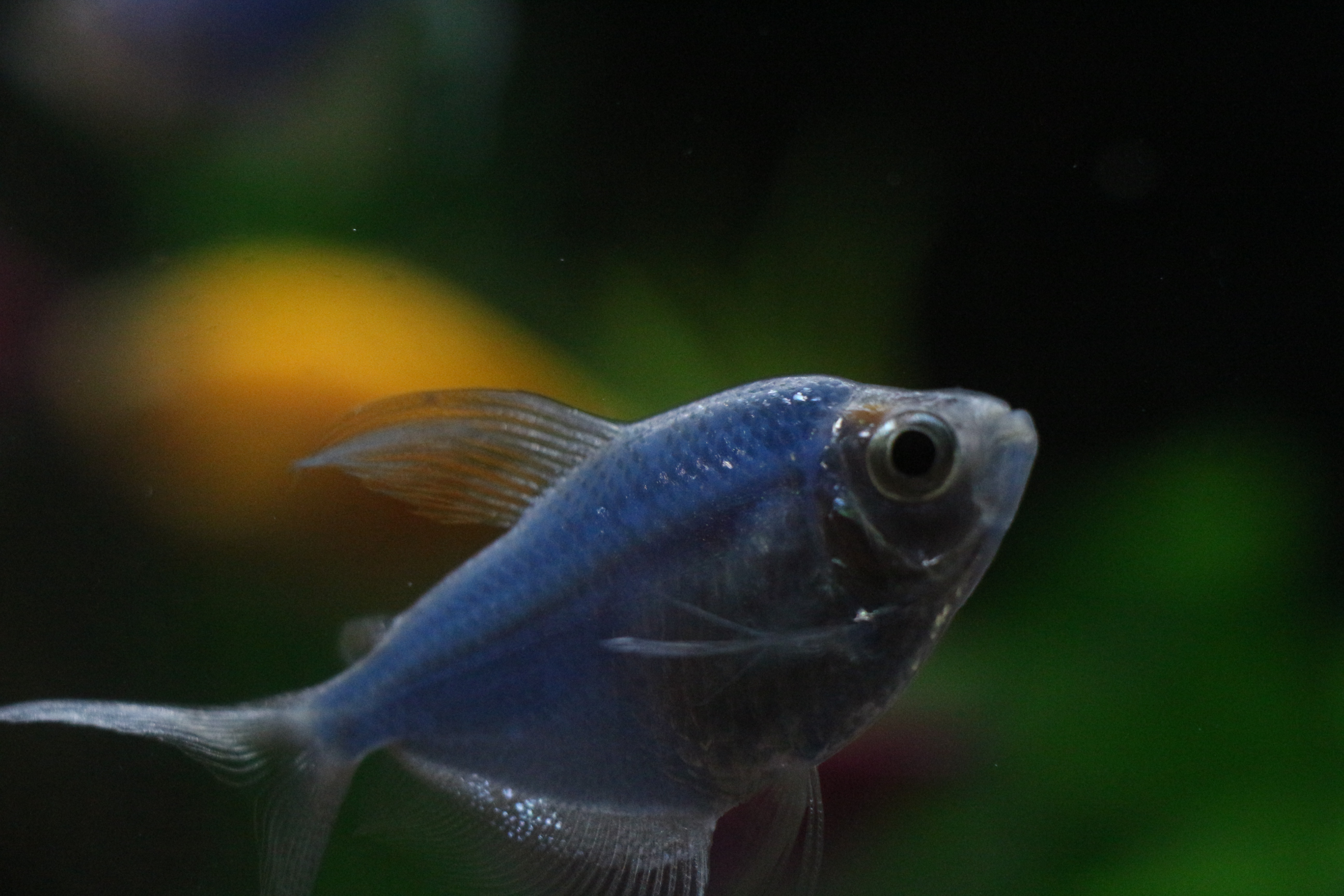
A "cosmic blue" long fin tetra glofish

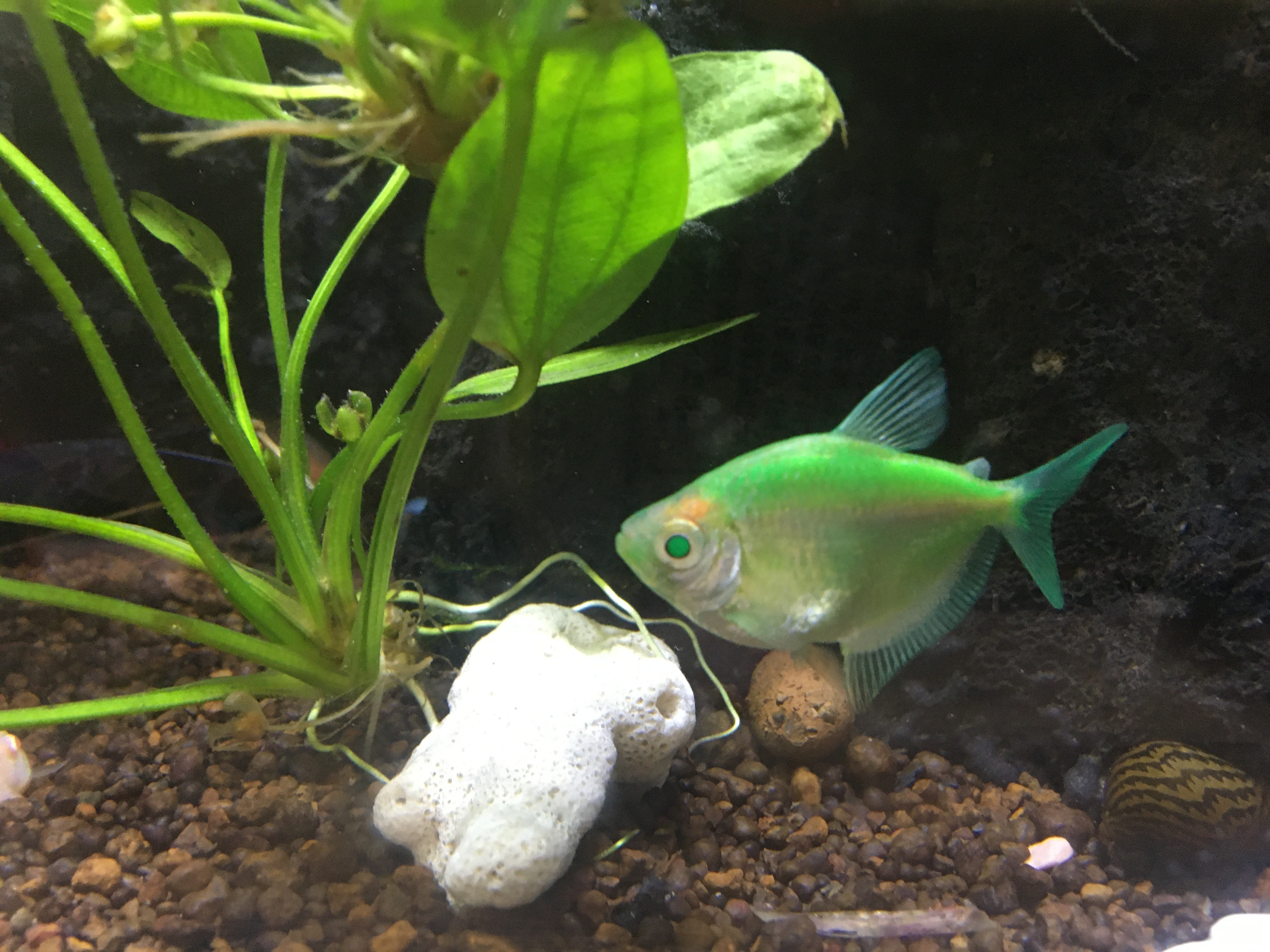
Electric Green GloFish Tetra

In addition to the red zebrafish, Yorktown Technologies released green and orange-yellow versions of the zebrafish in mid-2006. In 2011, blue and purple zebrafish were released. These lines of fish incorporate genes from sea coral. In 2012, Yorktown Technologies introduced a green version of a GloFish derived from a different species of fish, the black tetra. This was followed by a green version of a tiger barb. In 2013, Yorktown Technologies introduced orange, pink, and purple Tetras, which made Tetras the first GloFish to be available in pink. This was followed in 2014 by the release of red and blue Tetras. The colors are trademarked as "Starfire Red", "Moonrise Pink", "Sunburst Orange", "Electric Green", "Cosmic Blue", and "Galactic Purple".

Other fish released include the GloFish shark, available in orange, green, and purple. Though these fish are not scientifically related to sharks, they are based on the albino rainbow shark. In February 2020, green GloFish bettas also known as Globettas were released, with three different variations. These variations include female, (young) male, and premium (adult) male.

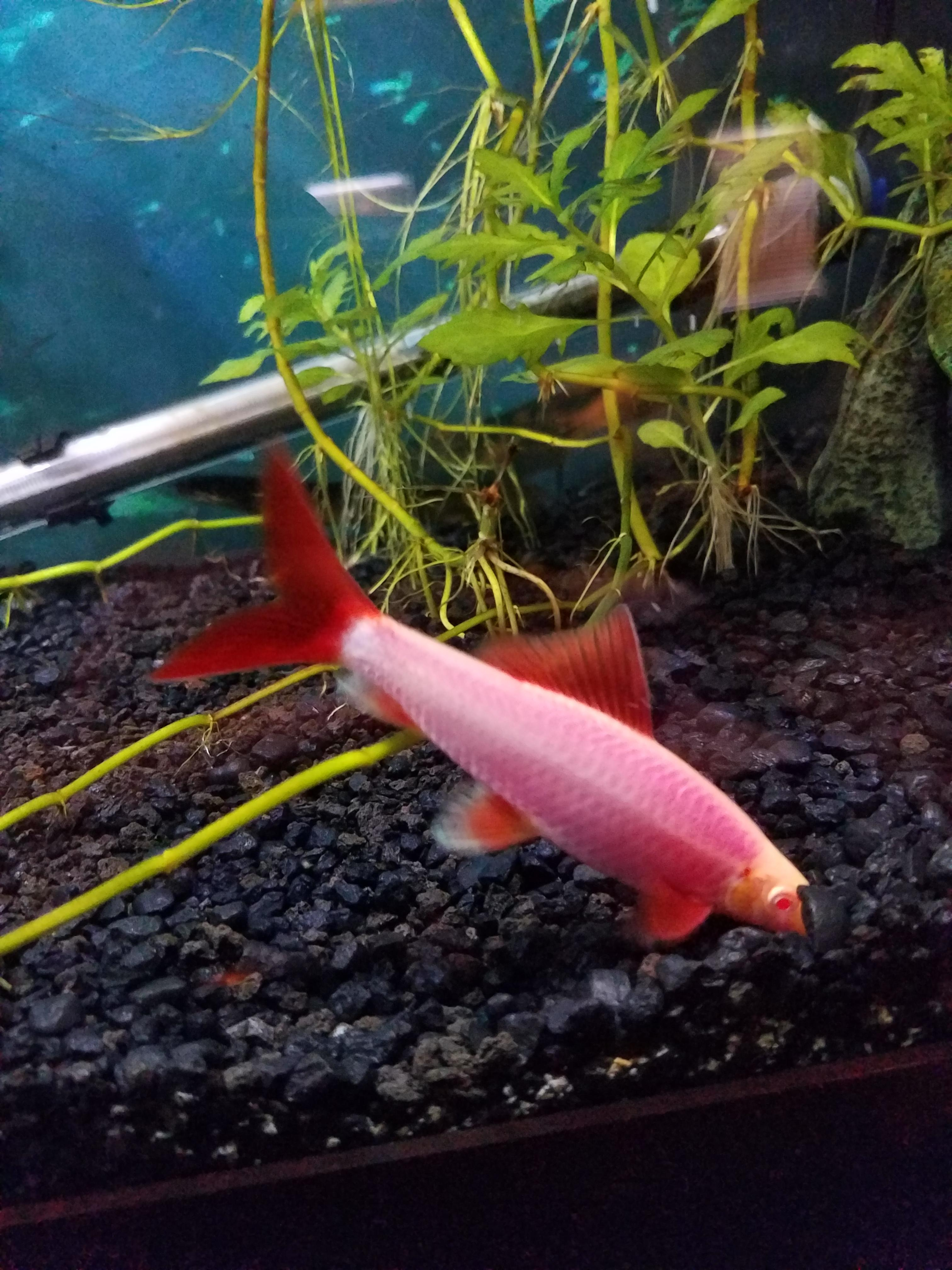
A "Galactic Purple" GloFish shark

Despite the speculation of aquarium enthusiasts that the eggs of the fluorescent fish were pressure treated to make them infertile, it has been found some GloFish are indeed fertile and will reproduce in a captive environment. However, the GloFish Fluorescent Fish License states "Intentional breeding and/or any sale, barter, or trade, of any offspring of GloFish fluorescent ornamental fish is strictly prohibited".

Sale or possession of GloFish was made illegal in California in 2003, due to a regulation that restricts the sale of genetically modified fish. The regulation was implemented before the marketing of GloFish, largely due to concern about a fast-growing biotech salmon. The regulations were lifted in 2015, due to a growing body of evidence and the findings of the Food and Drug Administration and the Florida Department of Agriculture and Consumer Services. GloFish are now legal in California for importation and commercial sale.

The import, sale and possession of these fish is not permitted within the European Union. On November 9, 2006, however, the Netherlands' Ministry of Housing, Spatial Planning and the Environment (VROM) found 1,400 fluorescent fish, which were sold in various aquarium shops.

In January 2009, the U.S. Food & Drug Administration formalized their recommendations for genetically engineered animals. These non-binding recommendations describe the way in which FDA regulates all GM animals, including GloFish.

Research published in 2014 assessed the environmental safety associated with GloFish. One paper concluded that there is little risk of invasiveness into the environment. A second study concluded that there is no difference in risk between GloFish and wild-type danios.

== Public reception ==
The sentiments of aquarium retailers towards the GloFish have been used as an indicator of the public's positive reaction to controversial agricultural and aesthetic biotechnologies. The practical reception of GloFish among fish retailers was found to be affected by multiple effects, including concerns over ethics, customer demand, and the high cost of stocking the fish. Some retailers opted not to stock the fish due to low trust in federal agencies to properly regulate the organisms.

== Potential for wild establishment ==
=== Wild establishment and eDNA monitoring ===
Escape events have led to the establishment of non-native populations in natural waterways of Brazil's Atlantic Forest, where transgenic zebrafish (Danio rerio) expressing red fluorescent proteins have successfully invaded headwater streams. Research has demonstrated that environmental DNA (eDNA) of GloFish transgenes left in the environment could be used as a non-invasive and highly sensitive method to detect and track GloFish in the wild.

=== Vulnerability to predation ===
GloFish are more vulnerable to predation compared to the wild type, according to a study published in 2011. In experiments including habitat complexity, transgenic red fluorescent zebrafish were approximately twice as vulnerable as the wild type to predation by largemouth bass (Micropterus salmoides) and eastern mosquitofish (Gambusia holbrooki), two native predators that potentially resist invasion by introduced fish.

=== Reproductive success ===
According to Howard et al. 2015, wild-type males had a significant advantage over GloFish when it came to mating. According to the mating trials that were analyzed in the study, wild-type males sired twice as much as the genetically modified fish due to their more aggressive nature. However, in Owen et al. 2012 by the same group, female zebrafish preferred the GloFish rather than wild-type males.

== See also ==
- AquAdvantage salmon
- Bioluminescence
