= Paracrossochilus acerus =

Conservation status
- Least Concern (IUCN 3.1)

Scientific classification
- Kingdom: Animalia
- Phylum: Chordata
- Class: Actinopterygii
- Order: Cypriniformes
- Family: Cyprinidae
- Genus: Paracrossochilus
- Species: P. acerus

Binomial name
- Paracrossochilus acerus Inger & P. K. Chin, 1962

Species of fish

Paracrossochilus acerus is a species of freshwater ray-finned fish belonging to the family Cyprinidae, the family which includes the carps, barbs, minnows and related fishes. This species is endemic to northern Borneo where it is found in the Rajang and Baram river systems in Sarawak, the Temburong drainage in Brunei and the Beluran, Kinabatangan and Segama drainages in Sabah, while in Kalimantan it is found in the drainage system of the Kapuas River. This is a bethopelagicspecies that is found in large schools and which has a maximum published standard length of 9.5 cm (3.7 in).
