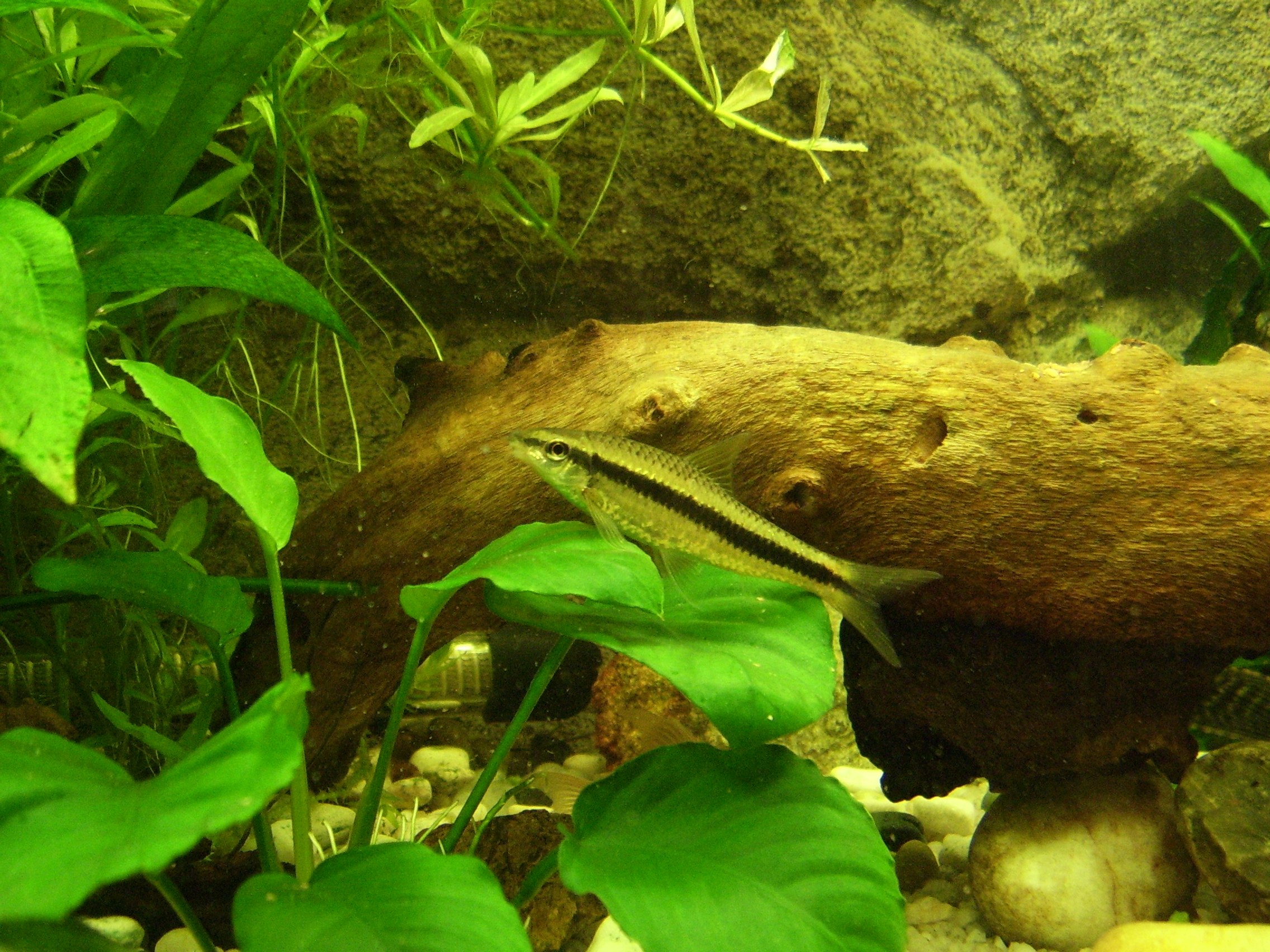

Conservation status
- Least Concern (IUCN 3.1)

Scientific classification
- Kingdom: Animalia
- Phylum: Chordata
- Class: Actinopterygii
- Order: Cypriniformes
- Family: Cyprinidae
- Subfamily: Labeoninae
- Genus: Crossocheilus
- Species: C. atrilimes

Binomial name
- Crossocheilus atrilimes Kottelat, 2000

= Crossocheilus atrilimes =

Species of fish

Crossocheilus atrilimes is a species of freshwater fish in the family Cyprinidae. It is found in Laos, in Thailand, and in Cambodia.
