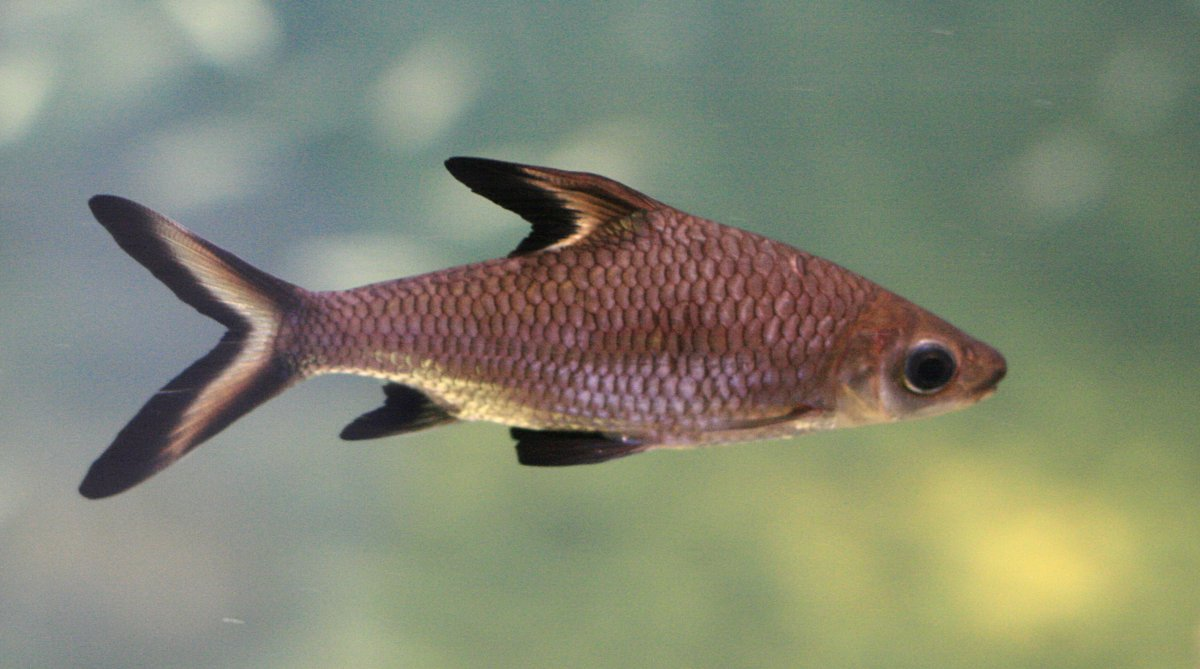
- A bala shark, B. melanopterus

Scientific classification
- Kingdom: Animalia
- Phylum: Chordata
- Class: Actinopterygii
- Division: Teleostei
- Order: Cypriniformes
- Family: Cyprinidae
- Subfamily: Cyprininae
- Genus: Balantiocheilos; Bleeker, 1860

Type species
- Barbus melanopterus Bleeker 1851.

= Balantiocheilos =

Genus of fishes

Balantiocheilos is a small genus of cyprinid fish from southeast Asia. It includes two species.

== Species ==
- Balantiocheilos ambusticauda H. H. Ng & Kottelat, 2007 (Burnt tail fish)
- Balantiocheilos melanopterus (Bleeker, 1851) (Bala shark, Tricolor sharkminnow)

== Distribution ==
The range of B. ambusticauda is listed as including the Chao Phraya and Mae Klong drainages in Thailand; the original distribution of this species included the Chao Phraya River drainage from Bangkok upriver to the lower Nan River. It has also been reported in the Mekong Basin in Vietnam, Cambodia and Laos from the Tonlé Sap lake to the lower Nam Ngum River, but confirmed records from this basin are lacking and this is not recognized as part of its range by the IUCN. Previous records of B. melanopterus from the same rivers is due to confusion with B. ambusticauda; B. melanopterus only occurs in the Malay Peninsula, Sumatra, and Borneo. Large numbers of B. melanopterus are exported for the aquarium trade from Thailand, but these are all captive bred.

== Description ==
Cyprinid fishes of the genus Balantiocheilos are easily distinguished from other members of the family by the presence of thick and fleshy lips, the lower lip bearing a large lobe that is deeply incised medially along its posterior edge and black along the distal margins of the dorsal, caudal, anal and pelvic fins. The posterior margin of the lower lip has often been described as forming a posteriorly opening pouch or pocket between the lip and the skin of the throat. B. ambusticauda can be differentiated from B. melanopterus by a shorter snout. Also, in B. ambusticauda the rictus (junction of the premaxilla and maxilla at the corner of the mouth) has posteriorly direct grooves that are curved instead of straight. Finally, B. ambusticauda has narrower black margins on the pelvic and anal fins (on the distal third or less instead of the distal half or more in B. melanopterus). B. ambusticauda also has some golden color as opposed to the silvery B. melanopterus. B. ambusticauda only reaches about 20 cm (8 in) TL as opposed to 35 cm (14 in) TL in B. melanopterus.

== Conservation ==
B. melanopterus is listed as an endangered species by the IUCN Red List. It has become rare or extinct in many river basins of its native range. In Danau Sentarum (Borneo), fishermen already reported in 1993 and 1995 that the populations have decreased dramatically after 1975, for no clear reason. Fishermen mentioned overfishing for the aquarium-fish trade or forest fires in 1975 and the resulting pollution as possible causes. The species is apparently extirpated in the Batang Hari basin (Sumatra) and it seems that all individuals of B. melanopterus exported from Indonesia and Thailand by the aquarium-fish trade are captive bred.

B. ambusticauda is believed to have gone extinct even before it was scientifically described. Humphrey & Bain speculated the decline was due to excessive capture for the aquarium fish trade, but this is unsubstantiated. Despite the lack of records in more than three decades, it is rated as critically endangered (rather than extinct) by the IUCN in the hope that a small undiscovered population remains.
