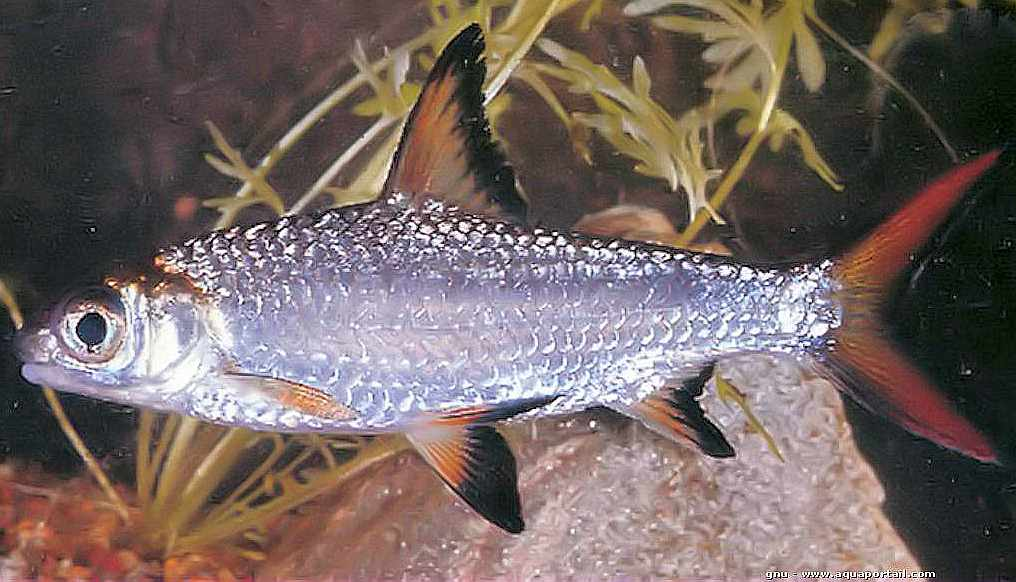
- A photo believed to depict a burnt-tailed barb in captivity appeared in a Norwegian aquarium magazine, though the publication year is unknown

Conservation status
- Critically endangered, possibly extinct (IUCN 3.1)

Scientific classification
- Kingdom: Animalia
- Phylum: Chordata
- Class: Actinopterygii
- Order: Cypriniformes
- Family: Cyprinidae
- Subfamily: Cyprininae
- Genus: Balantiocheilos
- Species: B. ambusticauda

Binomial name
- Balantiocheilos ambusticauda H. H. Ng & Kottelat, 2007

= Burnt-tailed barb =

Species of fish

The burnt-tailed barb (Balantiocheilos ambusticauda), also known as Siamese bala-shark, is a possibly extinct freshwater fish species from the family Cyprinidae. It is or was endemic to the Mae Klong and Chao Phraya River basins in Thailand.

== Taxonomy and discovery ==
The burnt-tailed barb was long considered as conspecific with the bala shark (Balantiocheilos melanopterus) until it was described as separate species in 2007. The holotype was collected by German ichthyologist Rolf Geisler (1925–2012) in February 1967 at Bung Boraphet, Nakhon Sawan province, Thailand. The material labelled as paratypes was collected by Rodolphe Meyer de Schauensee in 1936, by M. Harmand in 1883, and by Marie Firmin Bocourt in 1862.

== Description ==
The burnt-tailed barb is closely related to the bala shark (B. melanopterus). It differs from its congener by a shorter snout, grooves which are posteriorly directed at rictus curved (vs. straight in the bala shark), and narrower black margins on the pelvic and anal fins (on distal third or less compared to the bala shark where the black margins are on distal half or more).

== Distribution and status ==
It is endemic to Thailand where known from the Mae Klong and Chao Phraya River basins. It has also been reported from the Mekong Basin in Vietnam, Cambodia and Laos, but confirmed records from this basin are lacking and this is not recognized as part of its range by the IUCN. The closely related B. melanopterus has been reported from the same rivers, but this is due to confusion with B. ambusticauda; the true native range of B. melanopterus is further south in the Malay Peninsula, Borneo and Sumatra. Large numbers of B. melanopterus are exported from Thailand for the aquarium trade, but these are all captive bred.

According to Kittipong Jaruthanin, a Thai expert on freshwater fish and aquatic animals, the burnt-tailed barb likely did not have reddish-orange fins (as shown in illustrations). He discovered the last known specimen in 1986, in a Bang Mot tangerine orchard canal that draws water from the Chao Phraya River, in Thung Khru district (then Rat Burana district), Bangkok. In his view, if the fish had such fin coloration, it would have been clearly classified as a distinct species long ago. Instead, he believes its fins had fewer black markings than yellowish-white areas, and its head was shorter and blunter than that of the bala shark.

Despite surveys within its native range, it has not been recorded in more than three decades and is likely extinct. The IUCN rate it as critically endangered (rather than extinct) in the hope that a small undiscovered population remains. It has been speculated that capture for the aquarium trade was the reason for its drastic decline, but this is unsubstantiated. There has been extensive habitat destruction (pollution, drainage and dams) within its range and it is suspected it is sensitive to water quality.
