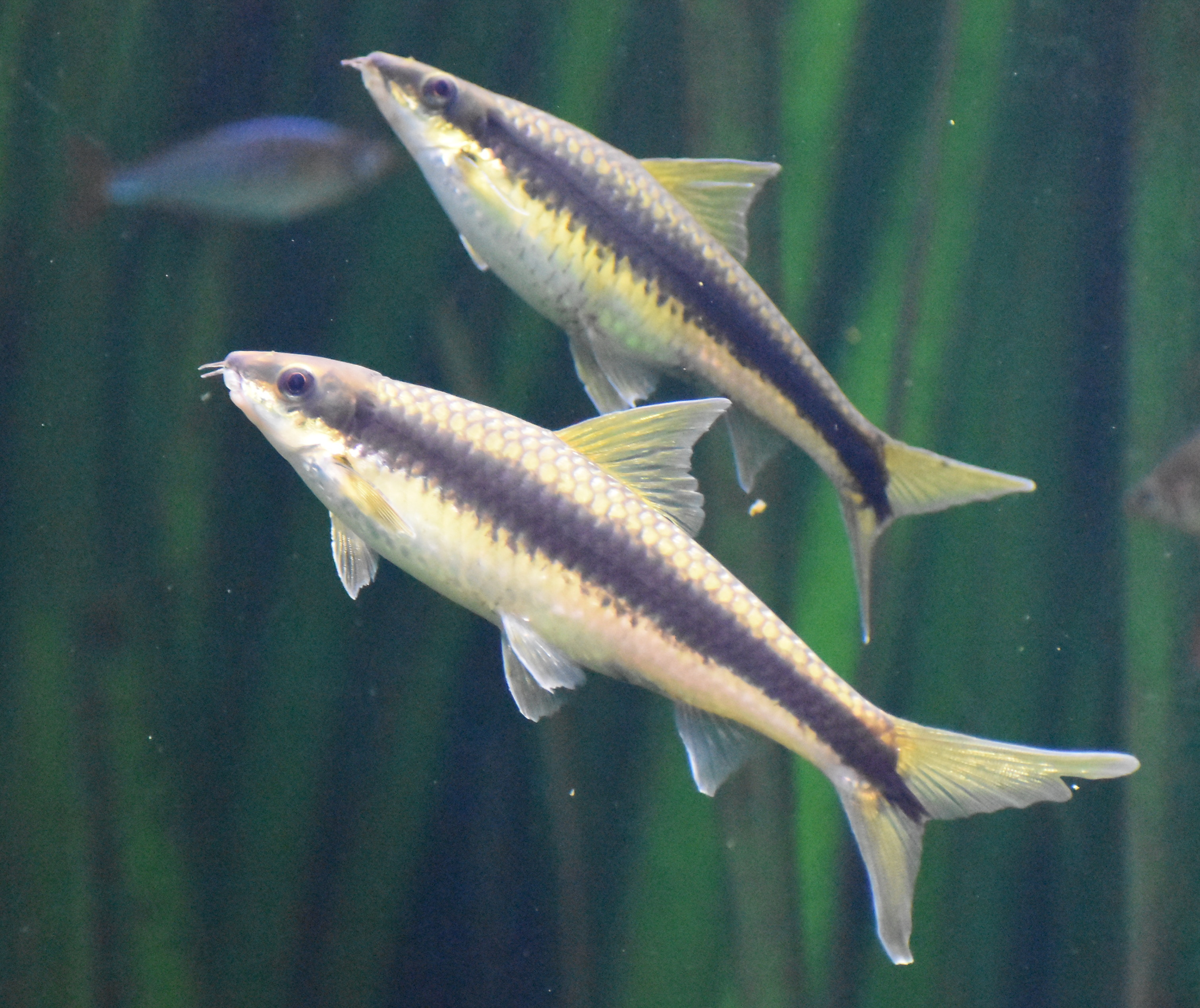
- Crossocheilus sp.

Scientific classification
- Kingdom: Animalia
- Phylum: Chordata
- Class: Actinopterygii
- Division: Teleostei
- Order: Cypriniformes
- Family: Cyprinidae
- Subfamily: Labeoninae
- Genus: Crossocheilus; Kuhl & van Hasselt, 1823

Type species
- Crossocheilus oblongus Kuhl & van Hasselt, 1823

Synonyms
- Crossocheilichthys Bleeker, 1859; Holotylognathus Fowler, 1934

= Crossocheilus =

Genus of fishes

Crossocheilus, also known as the fringe barbs, flying foxes, or "algae eaters", is a genus of fish in the family Cyprinidae. It is distributed in China, India, Indonesia, Malaysia and Thailand in Asia. These fish occur in several types of habitat, often fast-flowing rivers with rocky bottoms.

== Species ==
These are the currently recognized species in this genus:

- Crossocheilus atrilimes Kottelat, 2000
- Crossocheilus cobitis (Bleeker, 1854)
- Crossocheilus elegans Kottelat & H. H. Tan, 2011
- Crossocheilus gnathopogon M. C. W. Weber & de Beaufort, 1916
- Crossocheilus langei Bleeker, 1860
- Crossocheilus microstoma Ciccotto & Page, 2017
- Crossocheilus nigriloba Popta, 1904
- Crossocheilus oblongus Kuhl & van Hasselt, 1823
- Crossocheilus obscurus H. H. Tan & Kottelat, 2009
- Crossocheilus reticulatus (Fowler, 1934)
- Crossocheilus tchangi Fowler, 1935
