= Hadhrami =

Hadhrami or Hadrami may refer to:

== Ethnic groups and languages ==
- Hadhrami, a member of the Hadharem, people inhabiting the Hadhramaut region in Yemen
- Hadhrami Arabic, a dialect of Arabic spoken by the Hadhrami people
- Hadramautic language or Hadrami

== People ==
- Abd-Allah ibn Aamir Hadhrami, 7th century governor of Kufah
- Abd al-Salam al-Hadrami (died 2001), commander of the Arab volunteers who fought for the Afghan Taliban against the Northern Alliance
- Abu Hajer al-Hadhrami (1986–2015), Yemeni jihadist poet and munshid
- Ahmed Al-Hadrami (born 1988), Saudi footballer
- Al-Ala al-Hadhrami, 7th century Muslim commander and tax collector
- Hafs ibn al-Walid ibn Yusuf al-Hadrami, 8th century governor of Egypt for the Umayyad Caliphate
- Mohammed Al-Hadhrami (born 1979), Yemeni politician and diplomat
- Naif Al-Hadhrami (born 2001), Qatari footballer
- Salit bin 'Amr 'Ala bin Hadrami, 7th-century Muslim emissary to Bahrain
- Imam al-Hadrami, 11th-century North African Islamic theologian and jurist

== Places ==
- Hadrami sheikhdom, a state of the Protectorate of South Arabia
- Hadrami, Sanaa Governorate, Yemen

== See also ==
- Arabibarbus hadhrami, a species of ray-finned fish
