= Luciocyprinus langsoni =

Conservation status
- Vulnerable (IUCN 3.1)

Scientific classification
- Kingdom: Animalia
- Phylum: Chordata
- Class: Actinopterygii
- Order: Cypriniformes
- Family: Cyprinidae
- Genus: Luciocyprinus
- Species: L. langsoni

Binomial name
- Luciocyprinus langsoni Vaillant, 1904

Synonyms
- Fustis vivus Lin, 1932; Barbus normani Tchang, 1935

Species of fish

Luciocyprinus langsoni, the shuttle-like carp, is a species of cyprinid in the subfamily Cyprininae. It inhabits Vietnam and China. It has a maximum length of 79 centimetres (2 ft 7 in), a common length of 17 centimetres (6.7 in) and has a maximum published weight of 15 kilograms (33 lb 1 oz).
