= Discherodontus colemani =

Conservation status
- Data Deficient (IUCN 3.1)

Scientific classification
- Kingdom: Animalia
- Phylum: Chordata
- Class: Actinopterygii
- Order: Cypriniformes
- Family: Cyprinidae
- Subfamily: Cyprininae
- Genus: Discherodontus
- Species: D. colemani

Binomial name
- Discherodontus colemani (Fowler, 1937)

Synonyms
- Barbus colemani Fowler, 1937; Barbodes colemani (Fowler, 1937); Puntius colemani (Fowler, 1937)

Species of fish

Discherodontus colemani is a species of cyprinid fish. It is endemic to Thailand and restricted to the upper Chao Phraya River basin. It is an uncommon species that inhabits streams and river tributaries, occasionally the mainstreams.
