= Carassioides phongnhaensis =

Conservation status
- Data Deficient (IUCN 3.1)

Scientific classification
- Domain: Eukaryota
- Kingdom: Animalia
- Phylum: Chordata
- Class: Actinopterygii
- Order: Cypriniformes
- Family: Cyprinidae
- Subfamily: Cyprininae
- Genus: Carassioides
- Species: C. phongnhaensis

Binomial name
- Carassioides phongnhaensis Nguyen & Ho, 2003

Species of fish

Carassioides phongnhaensis is a species of ray-finned fish in the genus Carassioides. It is found in Vietnam.
