= Carassioides acuminatus =

Conservation status
- Least Concern (IUCN 3.1)

Scientific classification
- Kingdom: Animalia
- Phylum: Chordata
- Class: Actinopterygii
- Order: Cypriniformes
- Family: Cyprinidae
- Subfamily: Cyprininae
- Genus: Carassioides
- Species: C. acuminatus

Binomial name
- Carassioides acuminatus (Richardson, 1846)

Synonyms
- Cyprinus acuminatus Richardson, 1846; Carassioides cyprinus Richardson, 1846; Carrassioides cantonensis (Heincke, 1892); Cyprinion orientalis Vaillant, 1893; Carassioides rhombeus Ōshima, 1926; Carassioides argentea V. H. Nguyễn, 2002; Carassioides macropterus V. H. Nguyen, 2002

Species of fish

Carassioides acuminatus or black fish is a species of cyprinid fish in the subfamily Cyprininae. It is found in central and northern Vietnam and the Pearl River and Hainan in China. It may have been introduced into Laos. It occurs in slow flowing rivers with sandy or muddy beds. It has an omnivorous diet, including alga, insect larvae, zooplankton and organic detritus. It is sold in Vietnam for human consumption, where it valued as a food fish, and it is also used in aquaculture.
