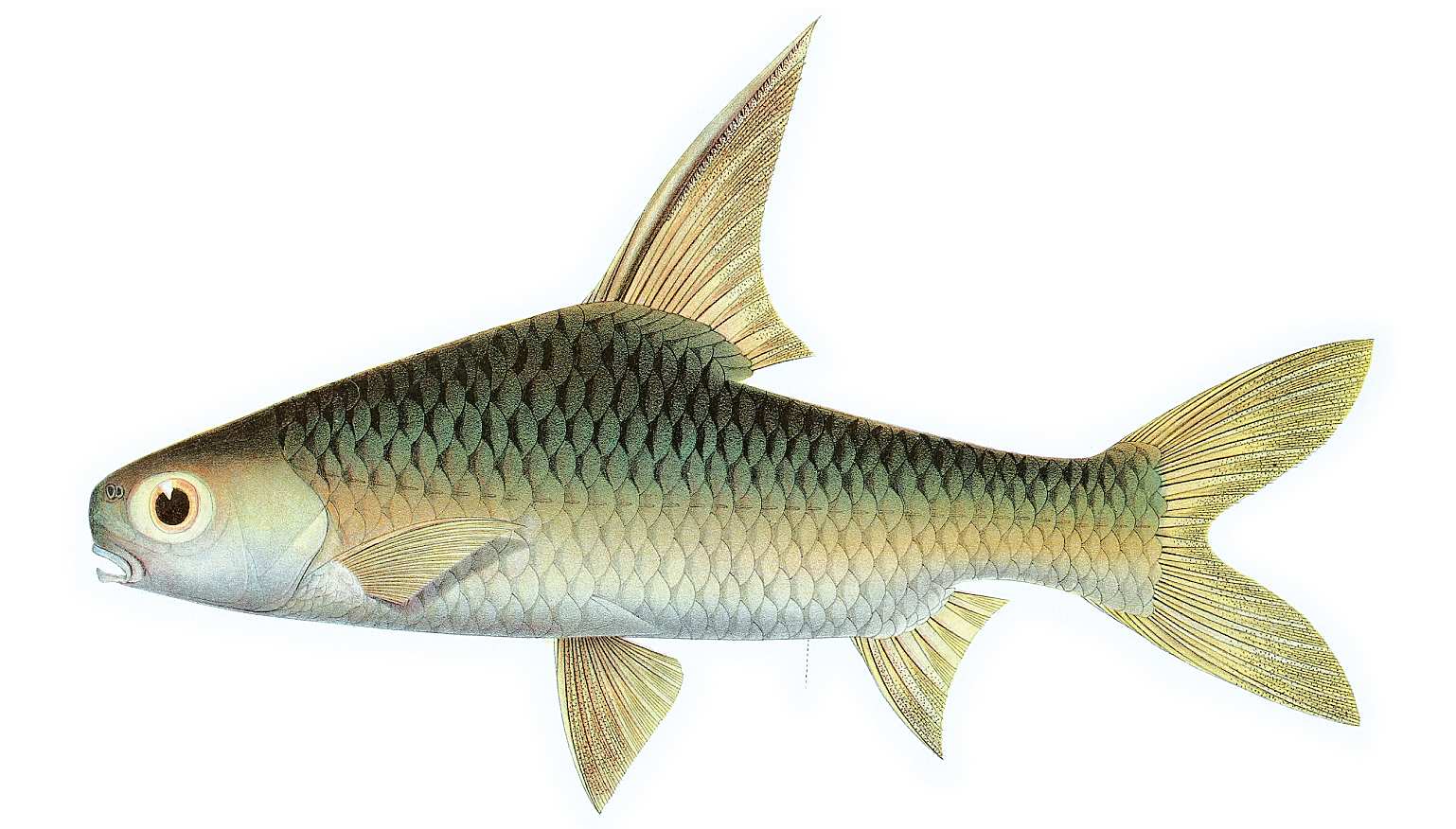
- Amblyrhynchichthys truncatus

Scientific classification
- Kingdom: Animalia
- Phylum: Chordata
- Class: Actinopterygii
- Order: Cypriniformes
- Family: Cyprinidae
- Subfamily: Cyprininae
- Genus: Amblyrhynchichthys; Bleeker, 1860

Type species
- Barbus truncatus Bleeker, 1850

= Amblyrhynchichthys =

Genus of fishes

Amblyrhynchichthys is a small genus of cyprinid fish containing only two Southeast Asian species.

== Species ==
- Amblyrhynchichthys micracanthus H. H. Ng & Kottelat, 2004
- Amblyrhynchichthys truncatus (Bleeker, 1851)
