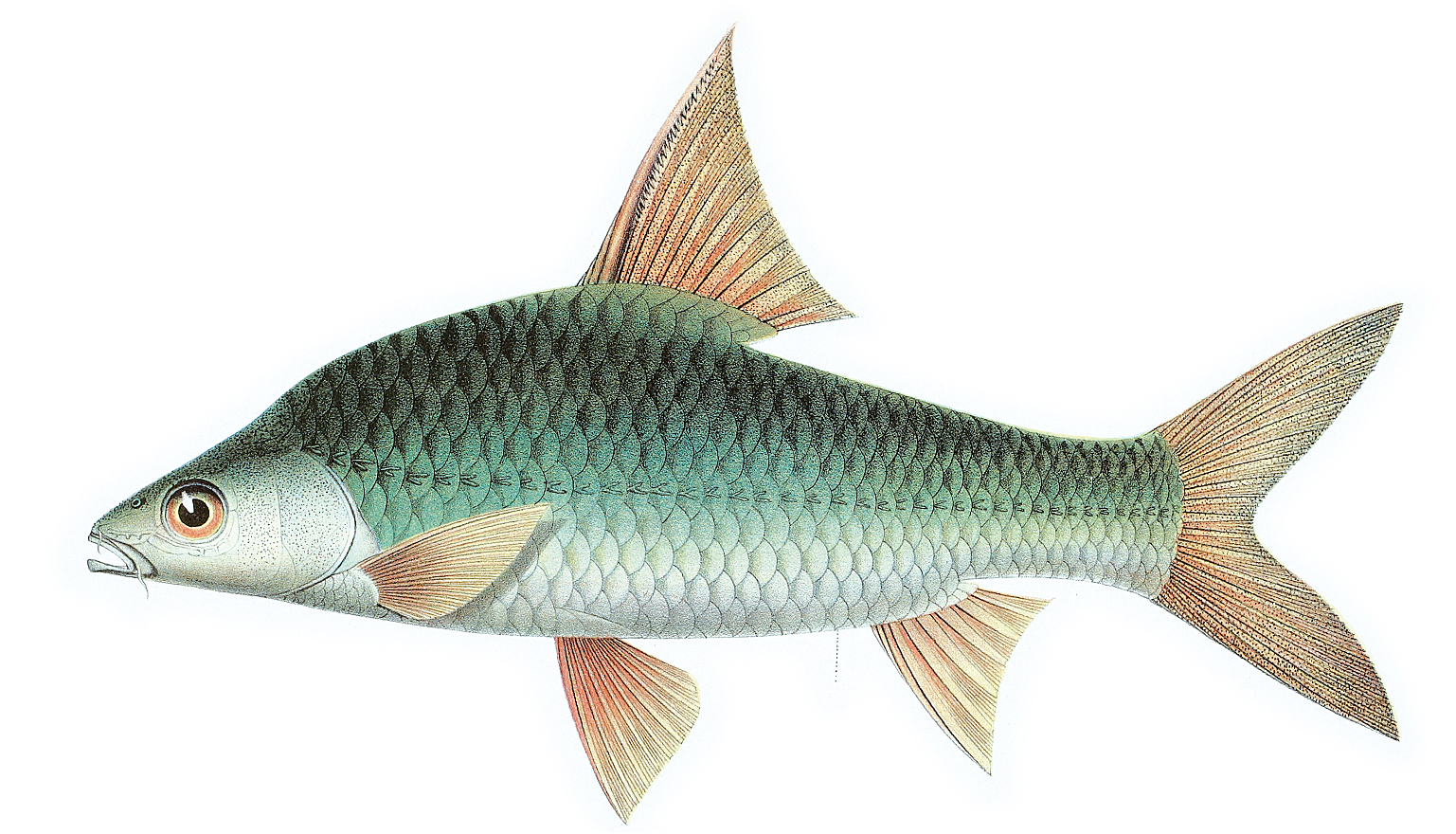
- Cyclocheilos enoplos

Scientific classification
- Kingdom: Animalia
- Phylum: Chordata
- Class: Actinopterygii
- Order: Cypriniformes
- Family: Cyprinidae
- Subfamily: Cyprininae
- Genus: Cyclocheilos; Bleeker, 1859

Type species
- Barbus macracanthus Bleeker, 1854

= Cyclocheilos =

Genus of fishes

Cyclocheilos is a genus of freshwater ray-finned fishes belonging to the family Cyprinidae, the family which includes the carps, barbs and related fishes. This fishes in this genus are found in Southeast Asia.

== Species ==
Cyclocheilos contains the following species:

- Cyclocheilos enoplos (Bleeker, 1849)
- Cyclocheilos furcatus (Sontirat, 1989)
