= Neobarynotus =

Conservation status
- Data Deficient (IUCN 3.1)

Scientific classification
- Kingdom: Animalia
- Phylum: Chordata
- Class: Actinopterygii
- Order: Cypriniformes
- Family: Cyprinidae
- Subfamily: Cyprininae
- Genus: Neobarynotus; Bănărescu, 1980
- Species: N. microlepis

Binomial name
- Neobarynotus microlepis (Bleeker, 1851)

Synonyms
- Capoeta microlepis Bleeker, 1851; Barynotus microlepis (Bleeker, 1851); Cyclocheilichthys microlepis (Bleeker, 1851)

Monotypic genus of fish

Neobarynotus is a monospecific genus of freshwater ray-finned fish belonging to the family Cyprinidae, the family which includes the carps, barbs, minnows and related fishes. The only species in the genus is Neobarynotus microlepis which is found in Southeast Asia.
