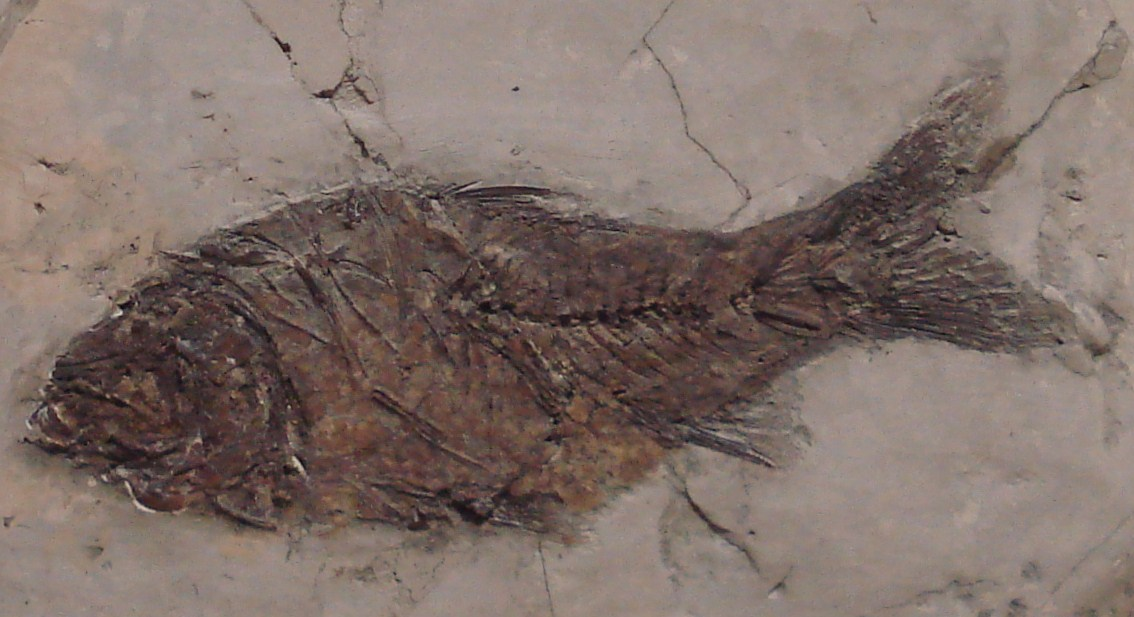
- fossil specimen

Scientific classification
- Domain: Eukaryota
- Kingdom: Animalia
- Phylum: Chordata
- Class: Actinopterygii
- Order: Cypriniformes
- Family: Cyprinidae
- Subfamily: Cyprininae
- Genus: †Palaeocarassius; Obrhelová, 1970

= Palaeocarassius =

Palaeocarassius Temporal range: Turolian

Extinct genus of fishes

Palaeocarassius is an extinct genus of Miocene-aged cyprinid fish closely related to the crucian carps of Carassius. Most fossils are of otoliths, teeth, fin spines, and scales found in Miocene-aged lacustrine strata throughout Europe, though, two species, P. basalticus and P. priscus (syn. Cyprinus priscus), are also known from whole body fossils, representing stout-bodied, large-headed animals that bear strong resemblances to the living crucian carps. The holotype of the type species, P. mydlovariensis, is a disarticulated head.

== Species ==
- Palaeocarassius mydlovariensis Obrhelová, 1970 (type species)
- Palaeocarassius basalticus Gaudant, 1997 (French species)
- Palaeocarassius obesus
- Palaeocarassius priscus (H. von Meyer, 1852) (syn. Cyprinus priscus)
