= Parasikukia =

Conservation status
- Least Concern (IUCN 3.1)

Scientific classification
- Kingdom: Animalia
- Phylum: Chordata
- Class: Actinopterygii
- Order: Cypriniformes
- Family: Cyprinidae
- Subfamily: Cyprininae
- Genus: Parasikukia; A. Doi, 2000
- Species: P. maculata

Binomial name
- Parasikukia maculata A. Doi, 2000

Species of fish

Parasikukia is a genus of cyprinid fish containing a single species, P. maculata. It is found in the Mekong in Thailand, Laos and Cambodia as well as the Mae Klong, Chao Phraya and south eastern river systems in Thailand and the westward drainages of the Cardamom Hills in Cambodia.
