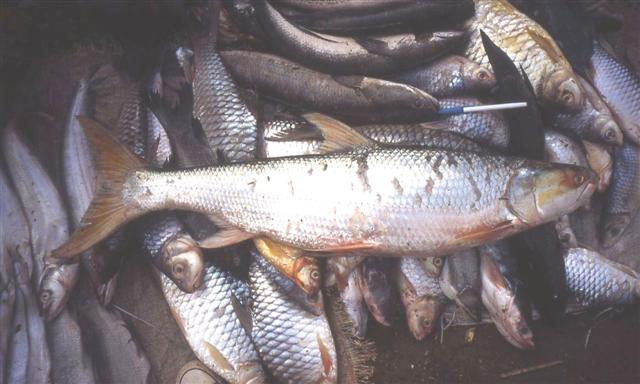

Conservation status
- Critically Endangered (IUCN 3.1)

Scientific classification
- Kingdom: Animalia
- Phylum: Chordata
- Class: Actinopterygii
- Division: Teleostei
- Order: Cypriniformes
- Family: Cyprinidae
- Subfamily: Cyprininae
- Genus: Aaptosyax; Rainboth, 1991
- Species: A. grypus

Binomial name
- Aaptosyax grypus Rainboth, 1991

= Giant salmon carp =

Species of fish

The giant salmon carp (Aaptosyax grypus), also termed the Mekong giant salmon carp, is a species of freshwater fish in the family Cyprinidae and the single species in the monotypic genus Aaptosyax. It is endemic to the middle reaches of the Mekong River in northern Cambodia, Laos, and Thailand. Its population is much reduced (>90%) as a result of overfishing and habitat degradation, and it is now considered Critically Endangered.

This fish can reach a length of 130 centimetres (51 in) and weight of 30 kilograms (66 lb). Between 2004 and 2022 no confirmed sightings of adult individuals of this species were made, until a specimen was found at a fish market in Cambodia.
