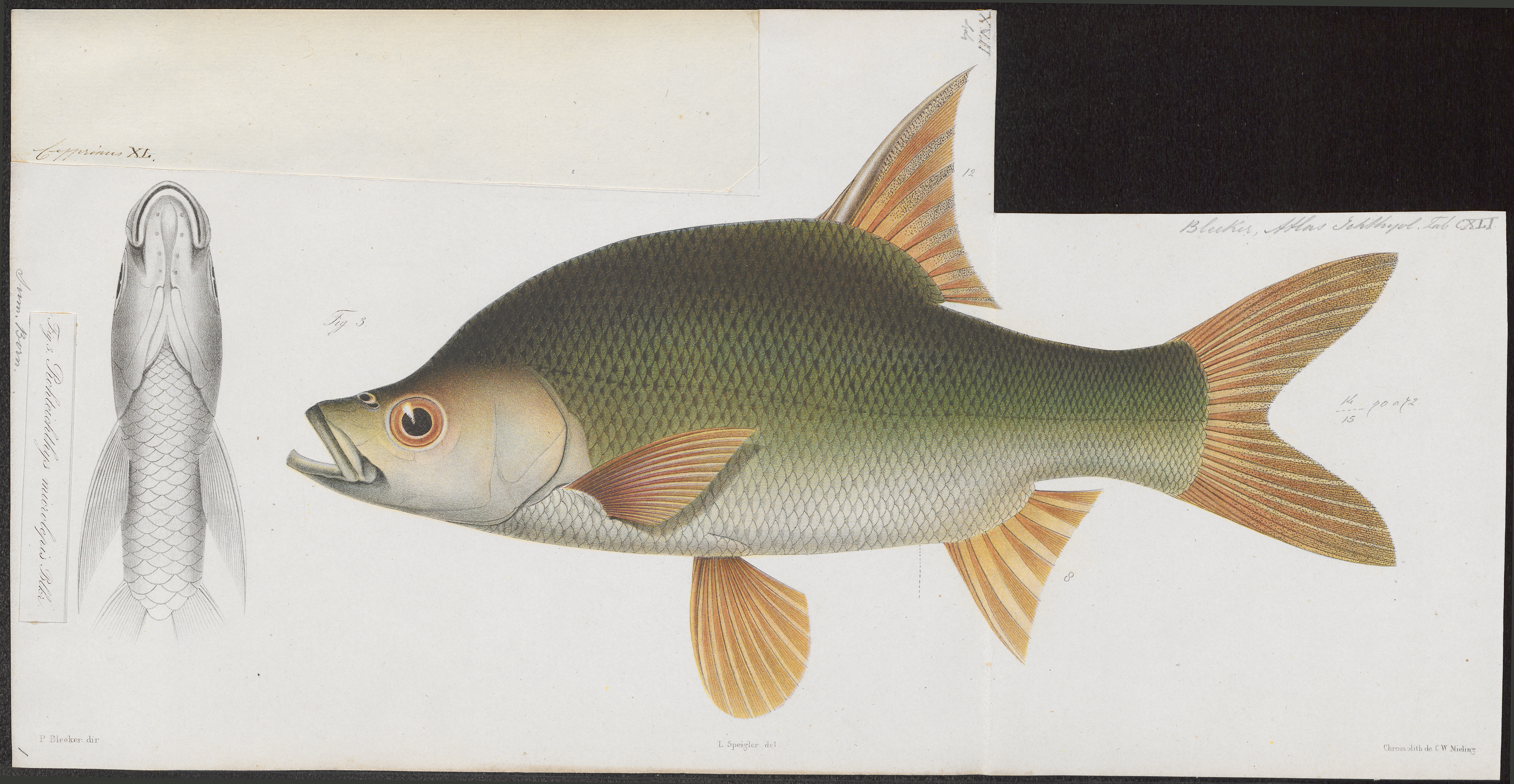

Conservation status
- Least Concern (IUCN 3.1)

Scientific classification
- Kingdom: Animalia
- Phylum: Chordata
- Class: Actinopterygii
- Order: Cypriniformes
- Family: Cyprinidae
- Subfamily: Cyprininae
- Genus: Rohteichthys; Bleeker, 1859
- Species: R. microlepis

Binomial name
- Rohteichthys microlepis (Bleeker, 1850)

Synonyms
- Barbus microlepis Bleeker, 1850; Rohtee microlepis (Bleeker, 1850); Systomus microlepis (Bleeker, 1850)

= Rohteichthys =

Monotypic genus of fish

Rohteichthys is a monospecific genus of freshwater ray-finned fish belonging to the family Cyprinidae, the family which includes the carps, barbs and related species. The only species in the genus is Rohteichthys microlepis. This species is found in Indonesia on the islands of Borneo and Sumatra.
