= Cosmochilus cardinalis =

Conservation status
- Endangered (IUCN 3.1)

Scientific classification
- Kingdom: Animalia
- Phylum: Chordata
- Class: Actinopterygii
- Order: Cypriniformes
- Family: Cyprinidae
- Genus: Cosmochilus
- Species: C. cardinalis

Binomial name
- Cosmochilus cardinalis X. L. Chu & T. R. Roberts, 1985

Species of fish

Cosmochilus cardinalis is a species of cyprinid in the genus Cosmochilus. It inhabits the Mekong in Yunnan, China.
