= Parator zonatus =

Scientific classification
- Kingdom: Animalia
- Phylum: Chordata
- Class: Actinopterygii
- Order: Cypriniformes
- Family: Cyprinidae
- Subfamily: Cyprininae
- Genus: Parator; H. W. Wu, G. R. Yang, P. Q. Yue & H. J. Huang, 1963
- Species: P. zonatus

Binomial name
- Parator zonatus (S. Y. Lin, 1935)

Synonyms
- Tor zonatus Lin, 1935; Barbus zonatus (Lin, 1935)

Species of fish

Parator zonatus, the trilobed-lip barbel, is a species of cyprinid fish found in the Zhujiang River in China and Vietnam. It is the only member of its genus.
