= Cyclocheilos furcatus =

Conservation status
- Least Concern (IUCN 3.1)

Scientific classification
- Kingdom: Animalia
- Phylum: Chordata
- Class: Actinopterygii
- Order: Cypriniformes
- Family: Cyprinidae
- Genus: Cyclocheilos
- Species: C. furcatus

Binomial name
- Cyclocheilos furcatus (Sontirat, 1989)

Synonyms
- Cyclocheilichthys furcatus Sontirat, 1989

Species of fish

Cyclocheilos furcatus, the Mekong giant barb, is a species of cyprinid fish in the genus Cyclocheilos found in the Mekong.

== Footnotes ==
- Froese, Rainer; Pauly, Daniel (eds.). "Cyclocheilichthys furcatus". FishBase.
