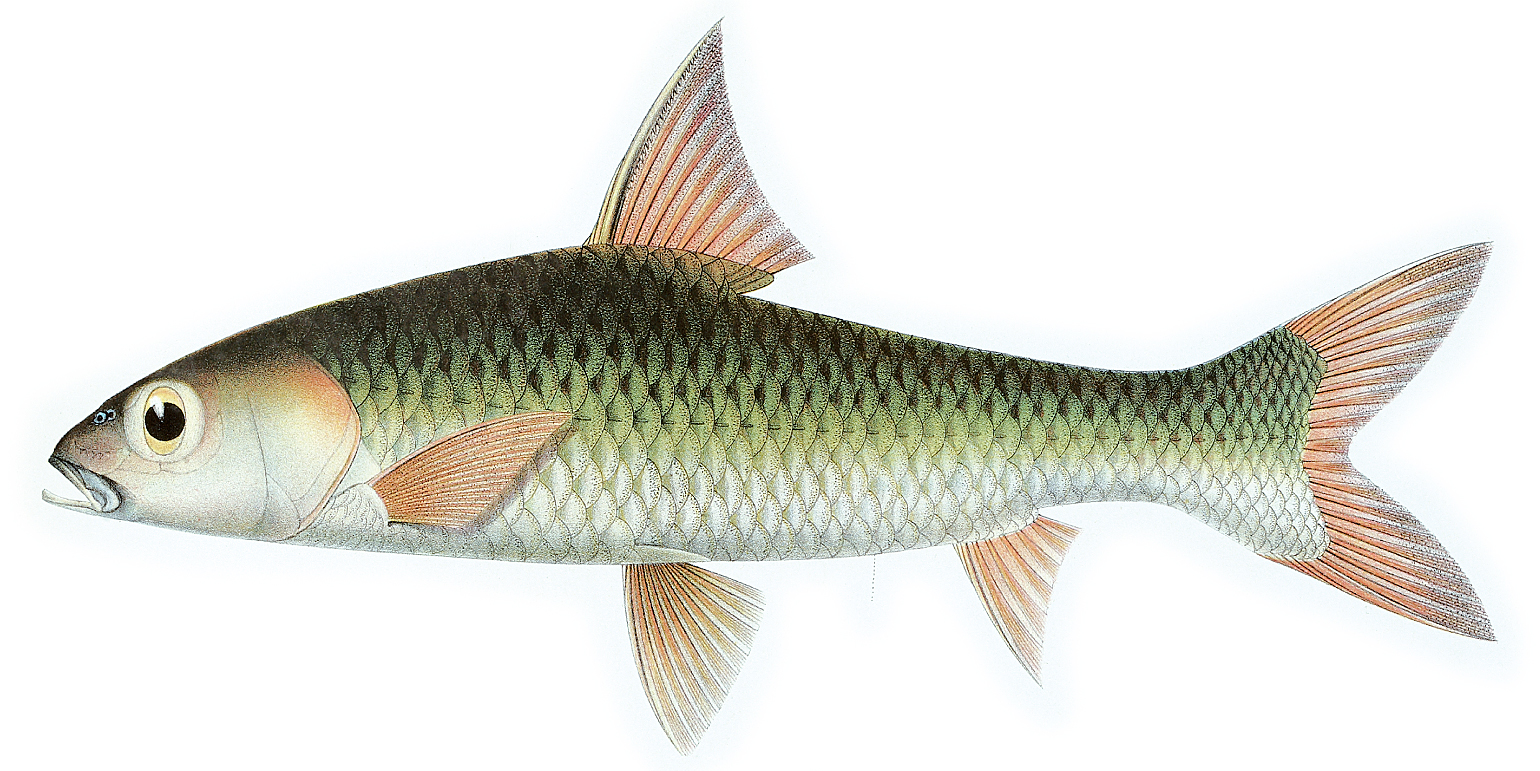
- Albulichthys albuloides

Conservation status
- Least Concern (IUCN 3.1)

Scientific classification
- Kingdom: Animalia
- Phylum: Chordata
- Class: Actinopterygii
- Order: Cypriniformes
- Family: Cyprinidae
- Subfamily: Cyprininae
- Genus: Albulichthys; Bleeker, 1860
- Species: A. albuloides

Binomial name
- Albulichthys albuloides (Bleeker, 1855)

Synonyms
- Systomus albuloides Bleeker, 1855; Albulichthys krempfi Pellegrin & Chevey, 1927

= Albulichthys =

Species of fish

Albulichthys is a monospecific genus of freshwater ray-finned fish belonging to the family Cyprinidae, the family which includes the carps, barbs, minnows and related fishes. The only member of the genus is Albulichthys albuloides, although the population on the mainland and the population on the islands of the Malay Archipelago may be different species.
