= Pocket-like lip barbel =

Conservation status
- Data Deficient (IUCN 3.1)

Scientific classification
- Kingdom: Animalia
- Phylum: Chordata
- Class: Actinopterygii
- Order: Cypriniformes
- Family: Cyprinidae
- Subfamily: Cyprininae
- Genus: Paraspinibarbus; X.-L. Chu & Kottelat, 1989
- Species: P. macracanthus

Binomial name
- Paraspinibarbus macracanthus (Pellegrin & Chevey, 1936)

Synonyms
- Spinibarbus macracanthus Pellegrin & Chevey, 1936; Parator macracanthus (Pellegrin & Chevey, 1936); Balantiocheilus hekouensis Wu, 1977

Species of fish

The pocket-like lip barbel (Paraspinibarbus macracanthus) is a species of freshwater ray-finned fish from the carp and minnow family, the Cyprinidae. It occurs in the Nam Xam and Nam Ma river basins in Laos, the Red River basin in Vietnam and Yunnan, as well as in most of the coastal drainage basins of northern Vietnam.
