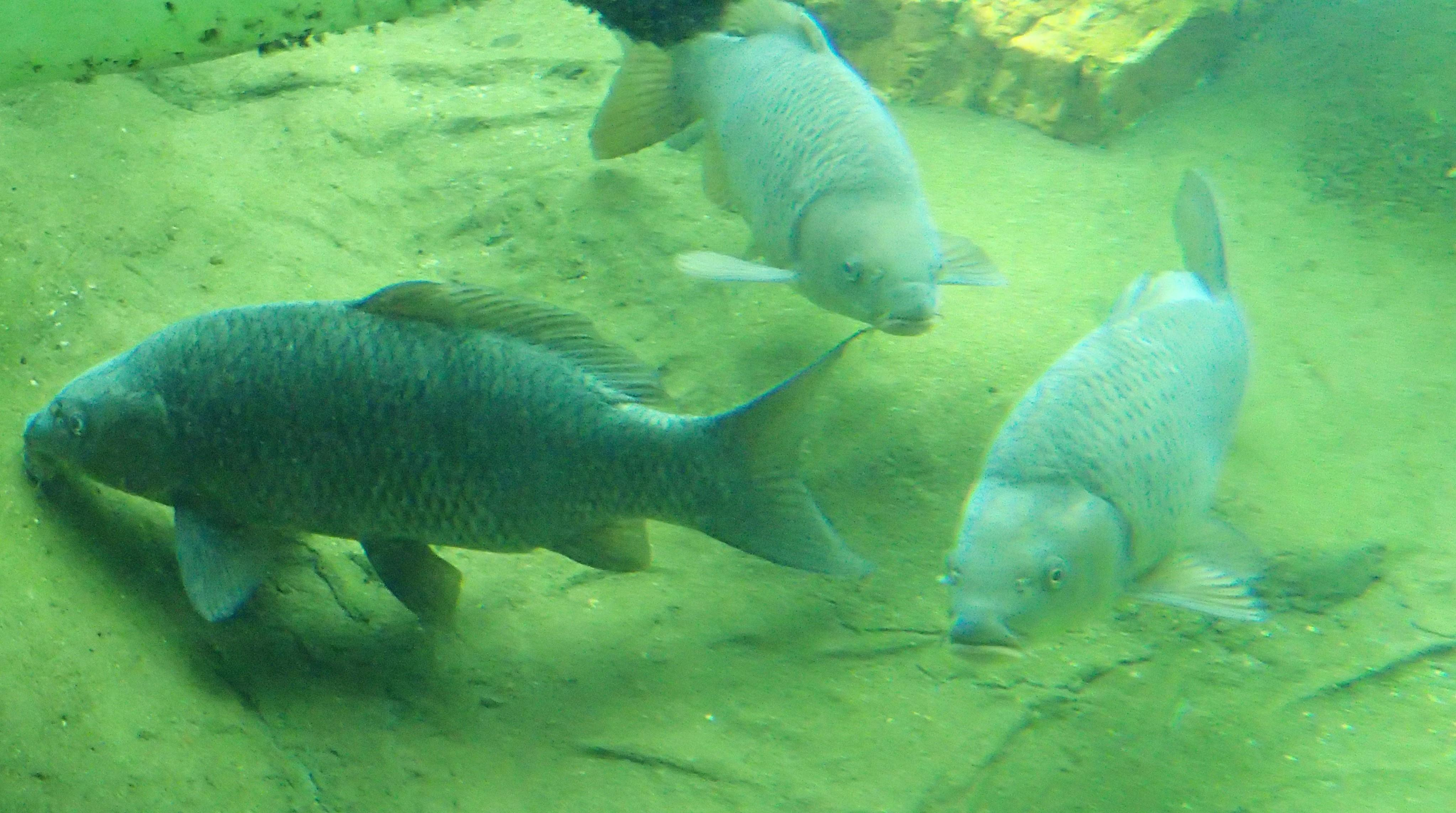

Conservation status
- Near Threatened (IUCN 3.1)

Scientific classification
- Kingdom: Animalia
- Phylum: Chordata
- Class: Actinopterygii
- Division: Teleostei
- Order: Cypriniformes
- Family: Cyprinidae
- Genus: Procypris
- Species: P. rabaudi

Binomial name
- Procypris rabaudi (T. L. Tchang, 1930)

Synonyms
- Cyprinus rabaudi T. L. Tchang, 1930; Paraprocypris papillosolabiatus P. W. Fang 1936

= Procypris rabaudi =

Species of fish

Procypris rabaudi, the rock carp, is a species of freshwater ray-finned fish belonging to the family Cyprinidae, the family which includes the carps, barbs, minnows and related fishes. The rock carp is endemic to China in the upper Chiang Jiang basin in Chongqing, Guizhou, Hubei, Sichuan, Yunnan and Gansu. This species has a maximum published standard length of 50.6 cm (19.9 in).
