= Discherodontus =

Scientific classification
- Kingdom: Animalia
- Phylum: Chordata
- Class: Actinopterygii
- Order: Cypriniformes
- Family: Cyprinidae
- Subfamily: Cyprininae
- Genus: Discherodontus; Rainboth, 1989

Type species
- Barbus ashmeadi Fowler, 1937

Genus of fishes

Discherodontus is a genus of small cyprinid fishes found in rivers and streams in Mainland Southeast Asia and Yunnan in China.

== Species ==
There are currently four recognized species in this genus:

- Discherodontus ashmeadi (Fowler, 1937)
- Discherodontus colemani (Fowler, 1937)
- Discherodontus halei (Duncker, 1904)
- Discherodontus parvus (H. W. Wu & R. D. Lin, 1977)
- Discherodontus schroederi (H. M. Smith, 1945)
- Discherodontus somphongsi (Benl & Klausewitz, 1962)
