= Troglocyclocheilus =

Conservation status
- Vulnerable (IUCN 3.1)

Scientific classification
- Kingdom: Animalia
- Phylum: Chordata
- Class: Actinopterygii
- Order: Cypriniformes
- Family: Cyprinidae
- Subfamily: Cyprininae
- Genus: Troglocyclocheilus; Kottelat & Bréhier, 1999
- Species: T. khammouanensis

Binomial name
- Troglocyclocheilus khammouanensis Kottelat & Bréhier, 1999

Monotypic genus of fish

Troglocyclocheilus is a monospecific genus of freshwater, troglobitic ray-finned fish belonging to the family Cyprinidae, the carps, barbs and allied fishes. The only species in the genus Troglocyclocheilus khammouanensis which is known only from a single specimen, the holotype, collected from the resurgence of the Nam Don, near the village of Ban Phondou, Thakhek District in the Khammouane province of Laos at 17°33'50"N, 104°52'20"E.
