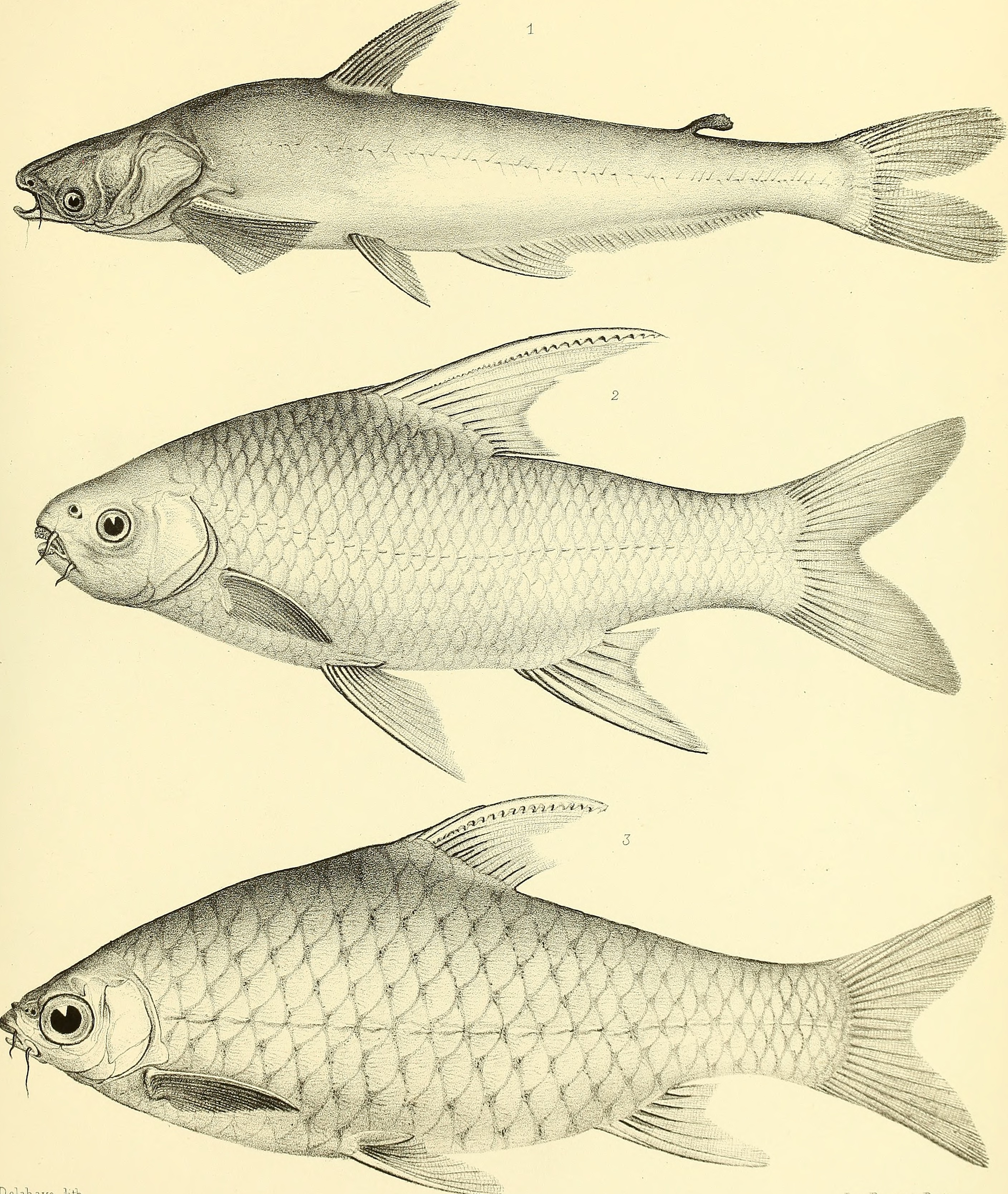
- Cosmochilus harmandi in middle (Pangasianodon hypophthalmus top, Hypsibarbus pierrei bottom)

Conservation status
- Least Concern (IUCN 3.1)

Scientific classification
- Domain: Eukaryota
- Kingdom: Animalia
- Phylum: Chordata
- Class: Actinopterygii
- Order: Cypriniformes
- Family: Cyprinidae
- Genus: Cosmochilus
- Species: C. harmandi

Binomial name
- Cosmochilus harmandi Sauvage, 1878

= Cosmochilus harmandi =

Species of fish

Cosmochilus harmandi is a species of freshwater fish belonging to the family of Cyprinidae. It is restricted to the Mekong and Chao Phraya rivers in Asia. It reaches up to 1 m (3.3 ft) in total length, but typically is about one-third that size. This widespread species is an important food fish.
