= Discherodontus somphongsi =

Scientific classification
- Kingdom: Animalia
- Phylum: Chordata
- Class: Actinopterygii
- Order: Cypriniformes
- Family: Cyprinidae
- Genus: Discherodontus
- Species: D. somphongsi

Binomial name
- Discherodontus somphongsi (Benl & Klausewitz, 1962)

Synonyms
- Puntius somphongsi Benl & Klausewitz, 1962

Species of fish

Discherodontus somphongsi is a species of freshwater ray-finned fish belonging to the genus Discherodontus within the family Cyprinidae, the family which includes the carps, barbs, minnows and related species. This species is found in the basin of the Mekong in Thailand. Some authorities regard this taxon as a synonym
