= Luciocyprinus =

Scientific classification
- Kingdom: Animalia
- Phylum: Chordata
- Class: Actinopterygii
- Order: Cypriniformes
- Family: Cyprinidae
- Subfamily: Cyprininae
- Genus: Luciocyprinus; Vaillant, 1904

Type species
- Luciocyprinus langsoni Vaillant, 1904

Genus of fishes

Luciocyprinus is a genus of freshwater ray-finned fish belonging to the family Cyprinidae, the family which includes the carps, barbs, minnows and related fishes. The fishes in this genus are found in China and Southeast Asia.

== Species ==
Luciocyprinus contains the following species:

- Luciocyprinus langsoni Vaillant, 1904
- Luciocyprinus striolatus G. H. Cui & X. L. Chu, 1986
