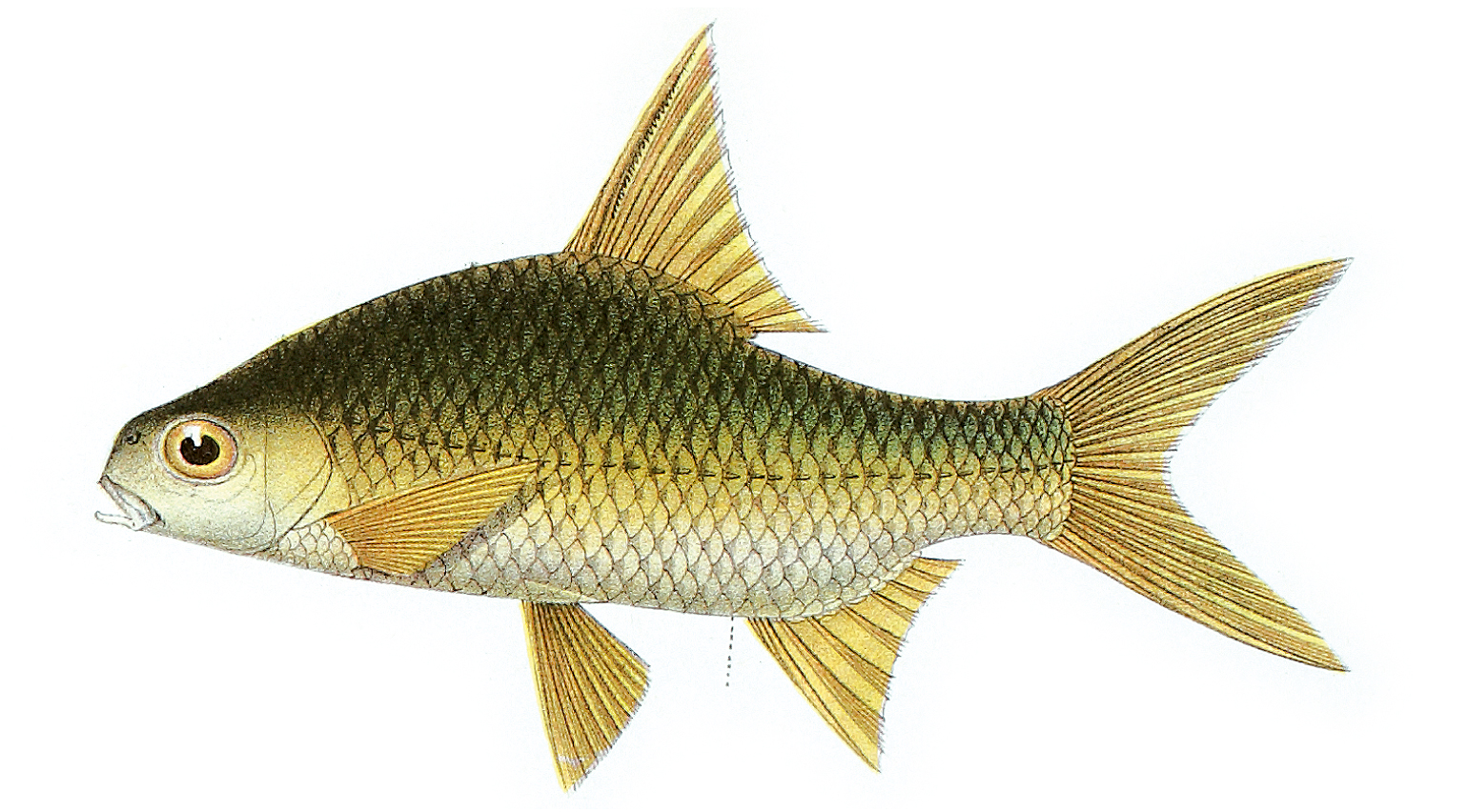

Conservation status
- Least Concern (IUCN 3.1)

Scientific classification
- Kingdom: Animalia
- Phylum: Chordata
- Class: Actinopterygii
- Order: Cypriniformes
- Family: Cyprinidae
- Subfamily: Cyprininae
- Genus: Kalimantania; Bănărescu, 1980
- Species: K. lawak

Binomial name
- Kalimantania lawak (Bleeker, 1855)

Synonyms
- Systomus lawak Bleeker, 1855; Barbus lawak (Bleeker, 1855); Puntioplites lawak (Bleeker, 1855); Puntius lawak (Bleeker, 1855); Amblyrhynchichthys altus Vaillant, 1893

= Kalimantania =

Monotypic genus of fish

Kalimantania is a monospecific genus of freshwater ray-finned fish belonging to the family Cyprinidae, the family which includes the carps, barbs, minnows and related fishes. The only species in the genus is Kalimantania lawak, a fish found only in Indonesia where it is known from the Kapuas system in Kalimantan and from Ciliwung, Bogowonto and Brantas river systems in Java.
