= Cosmochilus falcifer =

Conservation status
- Least Concern (IUCN 3.1)

Scientific classification
- Kingdom: Animalia
- Phylum: Chordata
- Class: Actinopterygii
- Order: Cypriniformes
- Family: Cyprinidae
- Genus: Cosmochilus
- Species: C. falcifer

Binomial name
- Cosmochilus falcifer Regan, 1906

Species of fish

Cosmochilus falcifer is a species of cyprinid in the genus Cosmochilus. This species is endemic to Borneo, occurring in Sarawak and Kalimantan.
