= Laocypris =

Conservation status
- Data Deficient (IUCN 3.1)

Scientific classification
- Kingdom: Animalia
- Phylum: Chordata
- Class: Actinopterygii
- Order: Cypriniformes
- Family: Cyprinidae
- Subfamily: Cyprininae
- Genus: Laocypris; Kottelat, 2000
- Species: L. hispida

Binomial name
- Laocypris hispida Kottelat, 2000

Genus of fish

Laocypris is a monospecific genus of freshwater ray-finned fish belonging to the family Cyprinidae, the family which includes the carps, barbs, minnows and related fishes. The only species so far formally described in this genus is Laocypris hispida which is endemic to Laos, where there my be more than one species.
