= Amblyrhynchichthys micracanthus =

Conservation status
- Least Concern (IUCN 3.1)

Scientific classification
- Kingdom: Animalia
- Phylum: Chordata
- Class: Actinopterygii
- Order: Cypriniformes
- Family: Cyprinidae
- Genus: Amblyrhynchichthys
- Species: A. micracanthus

Binomial name
- Amblyrhynchichthys micracanthus Ng & Kottelat, 2004

Species of fish

Amblyrhynchichthys micracanthus is a species of cyprinid in the genus Amblyrhynchichthys. It mainly inhabits rivers and is native to Southeast Asia, and was first described in 2004.
