= Luciocyprinus striolatus =

Conservation status
- Endangered (IUCN 3.1)

Scientific classification
- Kingdom: Animalia
- Phylum: Chordata
- Class: Actinopterygii
- Order: Cypriniformes
- Family: Cyprinidae
- Genus: Luciocyprinus
- Species: L. striolatus

Binomial name
- Luciocyprinus striolatus Cui & Chu, 1986

Species of fish

Luciocyprinus striolatus is a species of endangered cyprinid in the genus Luciocyprinus. It inhabits Laos and Yunnan, China and has a maximum length of 200 centimetres (6 ft 7 in).
