= Discherodontus ashmeadi =

Conservation status
- Least Concern (IUCN 3.1)

Scientific classification
- Kingdom: Animalia
- Phylum: Chordata
- Class: Actinopterygii
- Order: Cypriniformes
- Family: Cyprinidae
- Genus: Discherodontus
- Species: D. ashmeadi

Binomial name
- Discherodontus ashmeadi (Fowler, 1937)

Synonyms
- Barbus ashmeadi Fowler, 1937; Puntius ashmeadi (Fowler, 1937)

Species of fish

Discherodontus ashmeadi, commonly known as the redtail barb, is a fish native to the lower Mekong river basin in Thailand, Cambodia, Vietnam, and Laos. It inhabits both the mainstream Mekong and its tributaries, as well as lakes and reservoirs connected to rivers. It grows to 13.6 cm (5.4 in) SL. It is present in mixed fisheries but is not an important fishery species.
