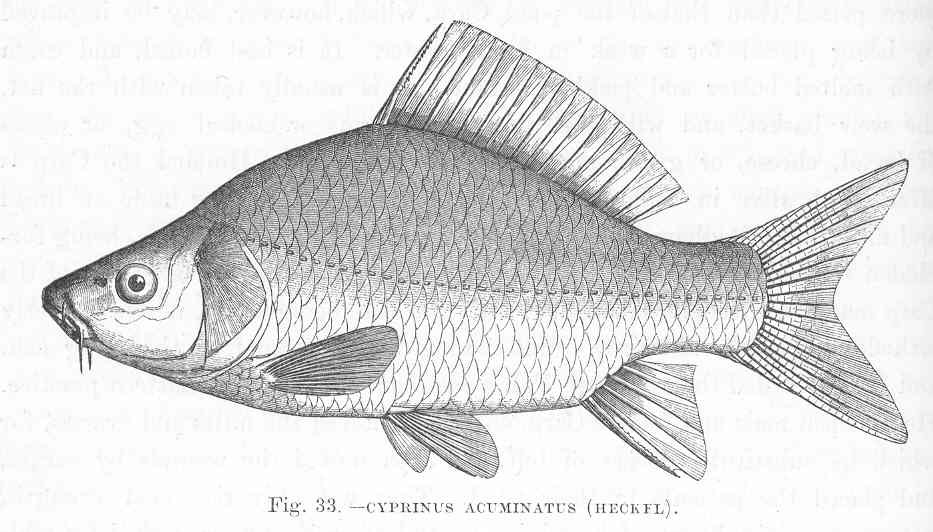

Scientific classification
- Kingdom: Animalia
- Phylum: Chordata
- Class: Actinopterygii
- Order: Cypriniformes
- Family: Cyprinidae
- Subfamily: Cyprininae
- Genus: Carassioides; Ōshima, 1926

Type species
- Carassioides rhombeus Oshima, 1926

= Carassioides =

Genus of fishes

Carassioides is a genus of cyprinid fish that occurs in East and Southeast Asia.

== Species ==
Carassioides contains the following species:

- Carassioides acuminatus (J. Richardson, 1846)
- Carassioides phongnhaensis V. H. Nguyễn, 2003
