= Discherodontus halei =

Conservation status
- Endangered (IUCN 3.1)

Scientific classification
- Kingdom: Animalia
- Phylum: Chordata
- Class: Actinopterygii
- Order: Cypriniformes
- Family: Cyprinidae
- Genus: Discherodontus
- Species: D. halei

Binomial name
- Discherodontus halei (Duncker, 1904)

Synonyms
- Barbus halei Duncker, 1904

Species of fish

Discherodontus halei is a species of cyprinid fish from Southeast Asia. It appears to have a disjunct range; it is known from Pahang River in western Peninsular Malaysia and from the Tapi River in southern Thailand, as well as from the northern Chao Phraya River basin (Mae Ping and Mae Klong), Thailand. This species can reach a length of 10.5 centimetres (4.1 in) TL.
