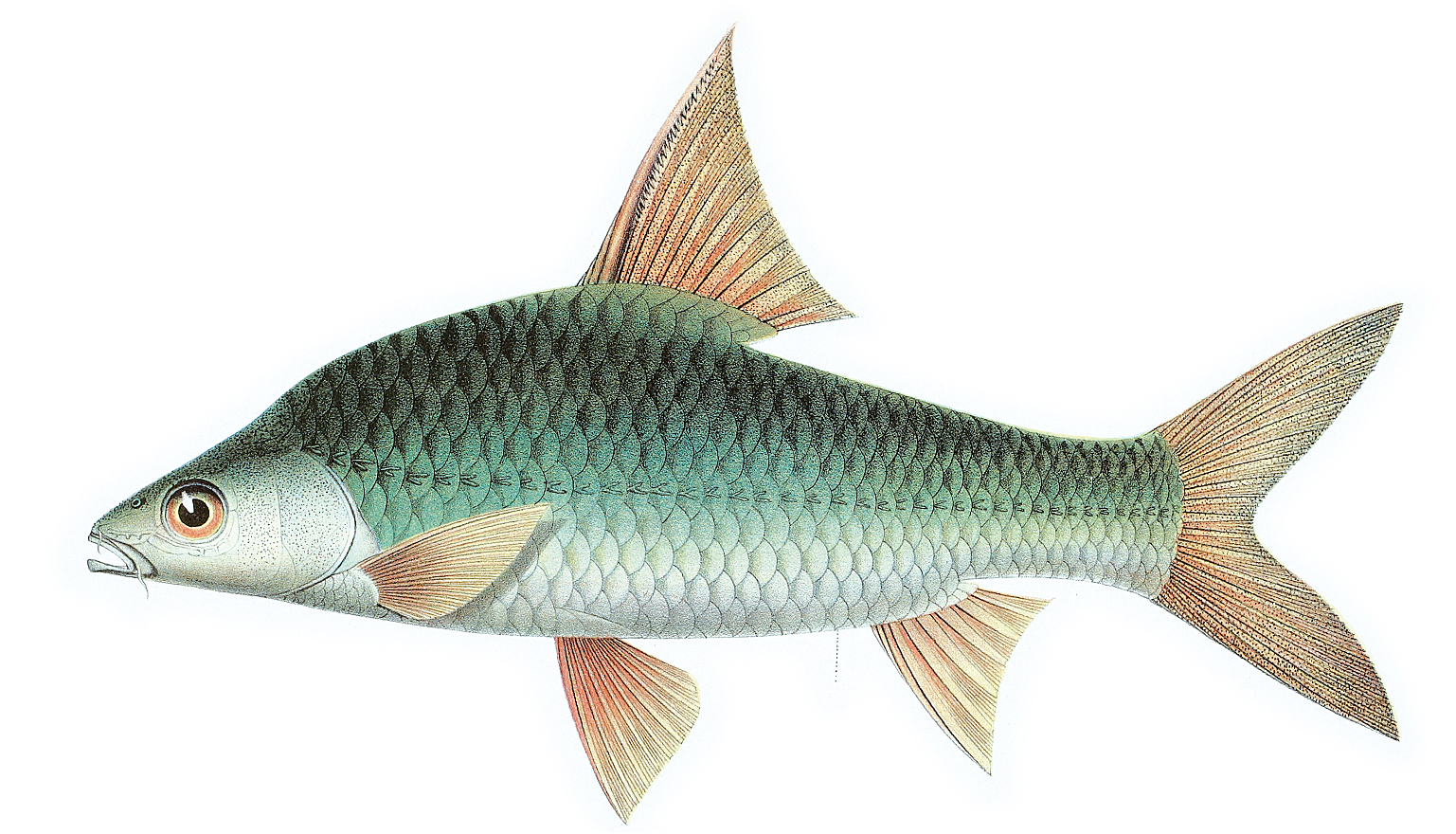

Conservation status
- Least Concern (IUCN 3.1)

Scientific classification
- Kingdom: Animalia
- Phylum: Chordata
- Class: Actinopterygii
- Order: Cypriniformes
- Family: Cyprinidae
- Genus: Cyclocheilos
- Species: C. enoplos

Binomial name
- Cyclocheilos enoplos (Bleeker, 1850)

Synonyms
- Barbus enoplos Bleeker, 1849; Cyclocheilichthys enoplos (Bleeker, 1849); Barbus macracanthus Bleeker, 1854; Cyclocheilichthys dumerilii Sauvage, 1881; Barbus enoploides Tirant, 1885; Cyclocheilichthys amblyceps Fowler, 1937

= Cyclocheilos enoplos =

Species of fish

Cyclocheilos enoplos, also known as soldier-river barb or soldier river barb, is a species of ray-finned fish in the genus Cyclocheilos from south-east Asia and the Malay Archipelago.

The soldier-river barb is a laterally compressed, slender-bodied fish with a bluish-silver dorsal surface and a silvery-white ventral side. The dorsal and pelvic fins bear faint black speckles, while the other fins are pale grey. The dorsal profile is slightly arched behind the eyes, with the ventral curvature being less pronounced. It possesses an adipose eyelid, a terminal to subterminal mouth, and two pairs of barbels. A distinctive feature is its strongly arched dorsal fin with robust, thickened spines serrated along the posterior edge. The lateral line runs straight, with a slight downward curve towards the posterior body. The fish can reach a maximum length of 74 cm (29 in), although individuals are more commonly encountered at an average length of around 45 cm (18 in).

In Thailand, known locally as pla ta kok (Thai: ปลาตะโกก, pronounced [plàː tà kòːk]) or pla jok (Thai: ปลาโจก, pronounced [plàː tjòːk]), the species is abundant in rivers and reservoirs across the northeastern, northern, and central regions, including the Chao Phraya, Mae Klong, Tha Chin, and Mekong Rivers and their tributaries, as well as other large water bodies. It typically inhabits flowing waters or expansive aquatic habitats.

Fishing methods employed for the soldier-river barb comprise approximately 65% hook-and-line fishing and 35% gill netting. The species is also farmed for human consumption. In aquaculture, broodstock individuals of good quality are typically around 3 years old and weigh approximately 750 g. The reproductive season falls between July and early September.

Ecologically, the fish occupies the midwater to benthic zones. Juveniles feed primarily on zooplankton, whereas adults consume bivalves, plant roots, insect larvae, crustaceans, and small fish. Spawning occurs during the rainy season, most likely in inundated floodplains or flooded riparian forests. After hatching, fry migrate back to the main rivers between October and December.

According to data from the Department of Fisheries for 2024, the total catch of soldier-river barb in Thailand was 1,183.90 t, with a market value of 88.71 million baht, averaging 75 baht/kg. The northeastern region recorded the highest production, with Yasothon Province ranking first at 325.37 t.

== Footnotes ==
- Froese, Rainer; Pauly, Daniel (eds.). "Cyclocheilichthys enoplos". FishBase.
