= Arabibarbus arabicus =

Conservation status
- Least Concern (IUCN 3.1)

Scientific classification
- Kingdom: Animalia
- Phylum: Chordata
- Class: Actinopterygii
- Order: Cypriniformes
- Family: Cyprinidae
- Subfamily: Torinae
- Genus: Arabibarbus
- Species: A. arabicus

Binomial name
- Arabibarbus arabicus (Trewavas, 1941)

Synonyms
- Barbus arabicus Trewavas, 1941

Species of fish

Arabibarbus arabicus is a species of ray-finned fish in the genus Arabibarbus which is found in wadis in the south western Arabian Peninsula.
