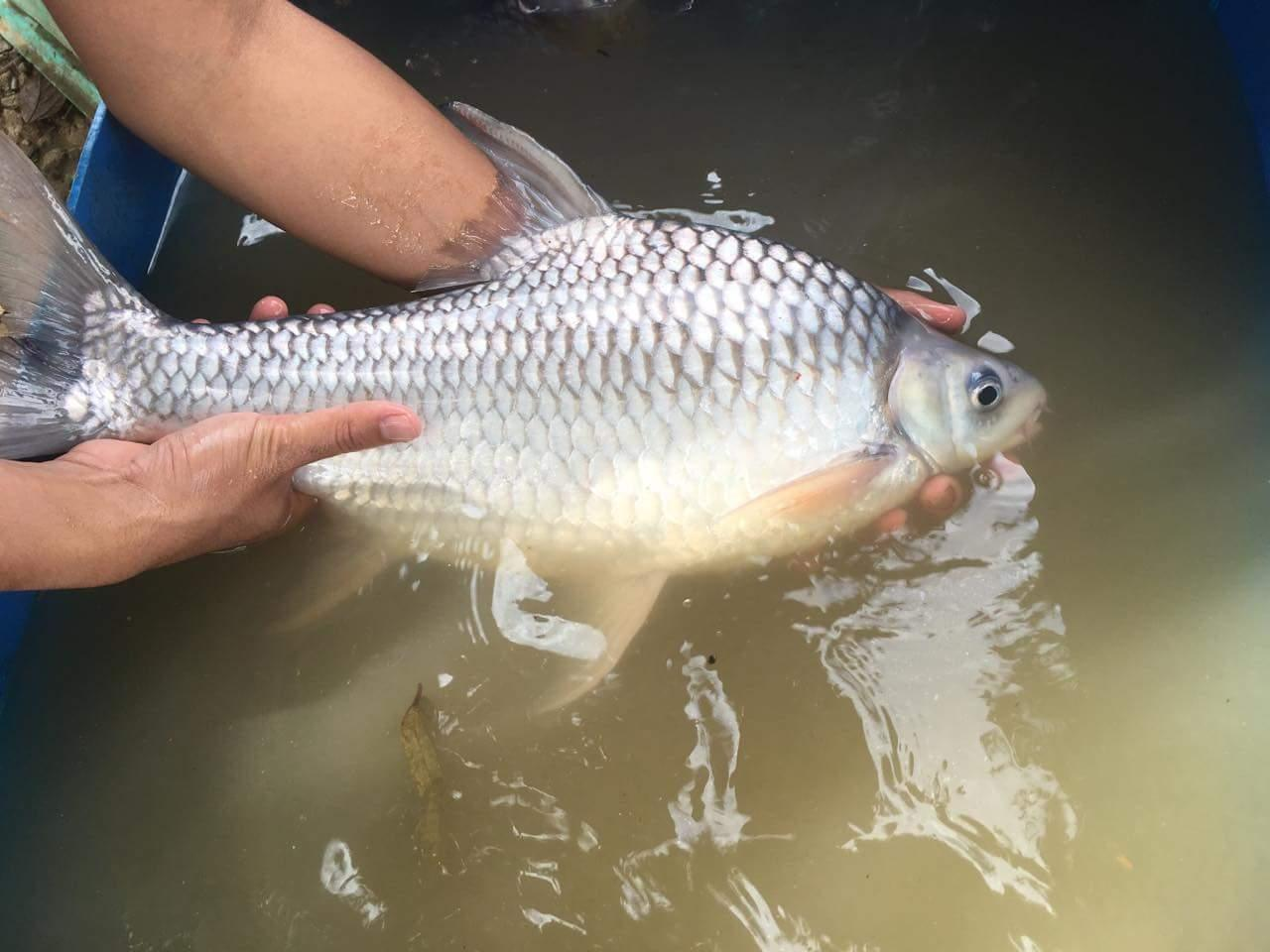
- Cosmochilus harmandi

Scientific classification
- Domain: Eukaryota
- Kingdom: Animalia
- Phylum: Chordata
- Class: Actinopterygii
- Order: Cypriniformes
- Family: Cyprinidae
- Subfamily: Cyprininae
- Genus: Cosmochilus; Sauvage, 1878

Type species
- Cosmochilus harmandi Sauvage, 1878

Synonyms
- Papillocheilus H. M. Smith, 1945

= Cosmochilus =

Genus of fishes

Cosmochilus is genus of cyprinid fish found in East and Southeast Asia.

== Species ==
Cosmochilus contains the following species:

- Cosmochilus cardinalis X. L. Chu & T. R. Roberts, 1985
- Cosmochilus falcifer Regan, 1906
- Cosmochilus harmandi Sauvage, 1878
