= Procypris mera =

Conservation status
- Data Deficient (IUCN 3.1)

Scientific classification
- Kingdom: Animalia
- Phylum: Chordata
- Class: Actinopterygii
- Order: Cypriniformes
- Family: Cyprinidae
- Genus: Procypris
- Species: P. mera

Binomial name
- Procypris mera S. Y. Lin, 1933

Synonyms
- Procypris niger Herre & Lin, 1934

Species of fish

Procypris mera, the Chinese ink carp, is a species of freshwater ray-finned fish belonging to the family Cyprinidae, the family which includes the carps, barbs, minnows and related fishes. This fish is endemic to the upper basin of the Pearl River in southern China and northern Viet Nam.
