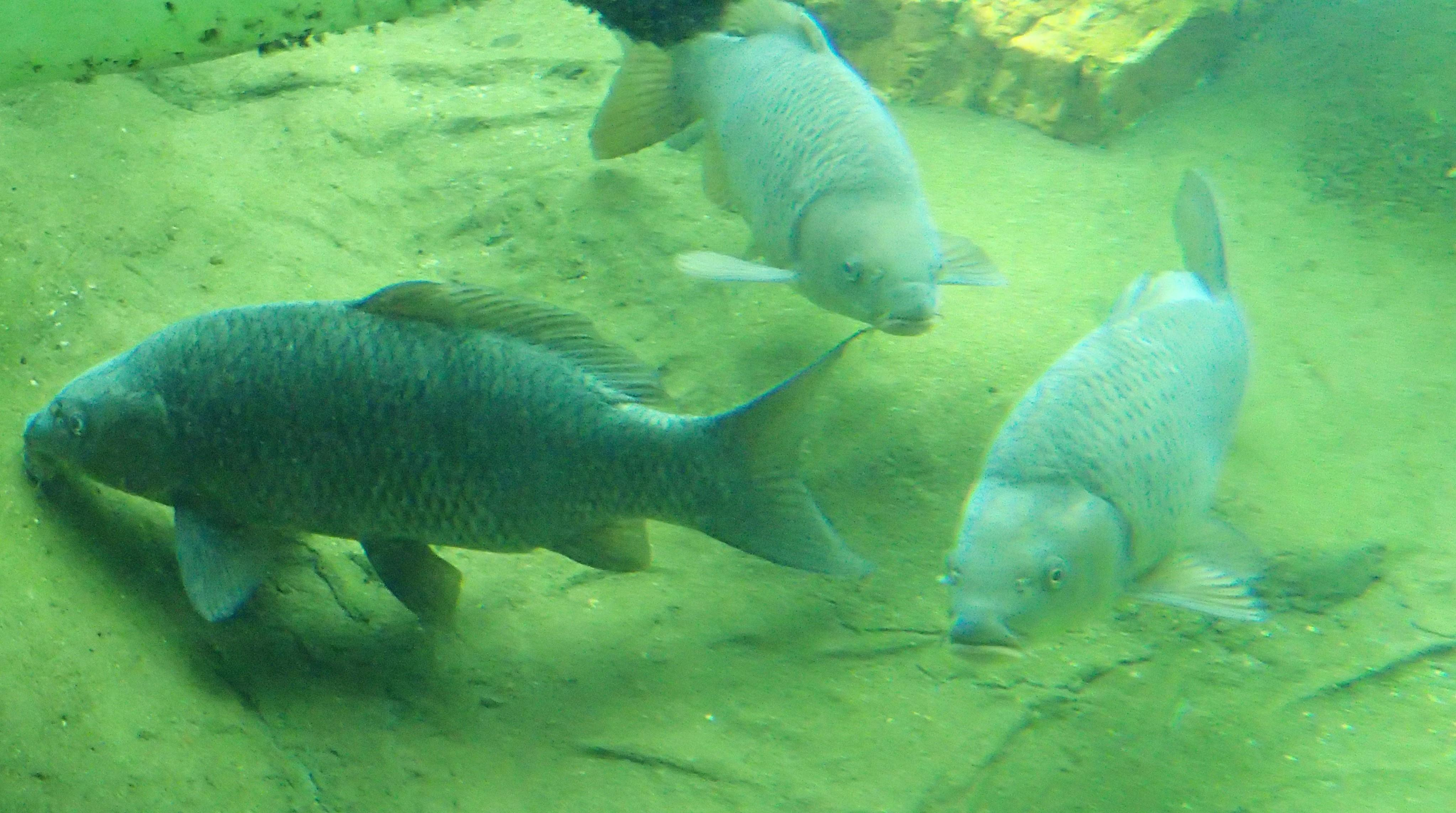
- Procypris rabaudi in the Ocean Park Aquarium, Hong Kong

Scientific classification
- Kingdom: Animalia
- Phylum: Chordata
- Class: Actinopterygii
- Order: Cypriniformes
- Family: Cyprinidae
- Subfamily: Cyprininae
- Genus: Procypris; S. Y. Lin, 1933

Type species
- Procypris merus Lin, 1933

Synonyms
- Paraprocypris Fang, 1936

= Procypris =

Genus of fishes

Procypris is a genus of freshwater ray-finned fish belonging to the family Cyprinidae, the family which includes the carps, barbs, minnows and related fishes. The fishes in this genus are found in eastern Asia.

== Species ==
Procypris contains the following species:

- Procypris mera S. Y. Lin, 1933 (Chinese ink carp)
- Procypris rabaudi (T. L. Tchang, 1930) (Rock carp)
