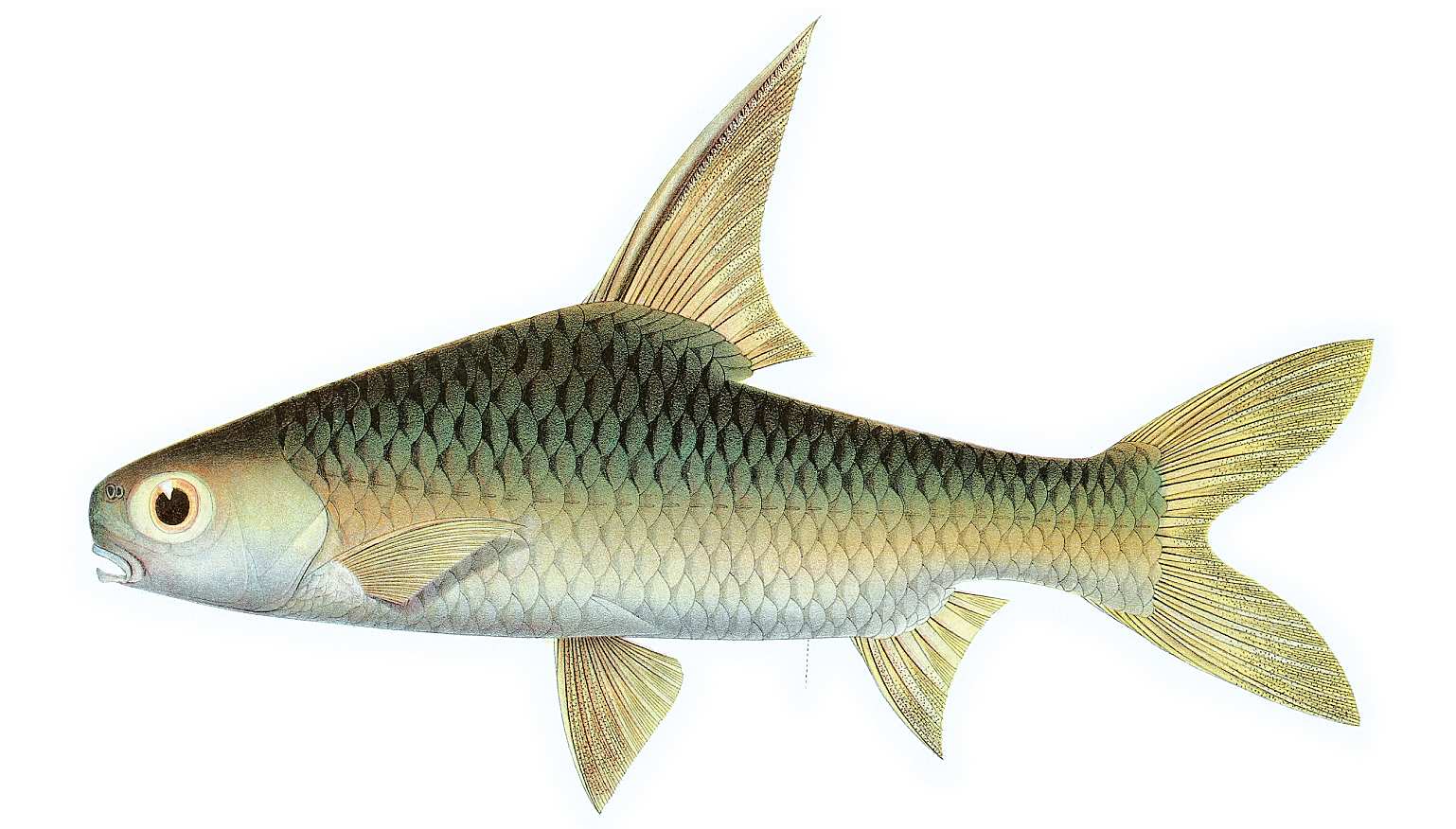

Conservation status
- Least Concern (IUCN 3.1)

Scientific classification
- Kingdom: Animalia
- Phylum: Chordata
- Class: Actinopterygii
- Order: Cypriniformes
- Family: Cyprinidae
- Genus: Amblyrhynchichthys
- Species: A. truncatus

Binomial name
- Amblyrhynchichthys truncatus (Bleeker, 1850)

Synonyms
- Barbus truncatus Bleeker, 1850

= Amblyrhynchichthys truncatus =

Species of fish

Amblyrhynchichthys truncatus is a species of cyprinid in the genus Amblyrhynchichthys, found in Southeast Asia. Males have a typical length of 30 cm, and a maximum length of 40 cm.
