= Discherodontus schroederi =

Conservation status
- Least Concern (IUCN 3.1)

Scientific classification
- Kingdom: Animalia
- Phylum: Chordata
- Class: Actinopterygii
- Order: Cypriniformes
- Family: Cyprinidae
- Genus: Discherodontus
- Species: D. schroederi

Binomial name
- Discherodontus schroederi (Smith, 1945)

Synonyms
- Acrossocheilus schroederi Smith, 1945

Species of fish

Discherodontus schroederi is a freshwater fish native to the Chao Phraya and Mae Klong basins in Thailand and to the Mekong basin in Laos. It inhabits submontane and hill streams and has also been found in the mainstream Mekong. Young individuals might occur in shaded, nearly stagnant side pools.
