= Discherodontus parvus =

Conservation status
- Data Deficient (IUCN 3.1)

Scientific classification
- Kingdom: Animalia
- Phylum: Chordata
- Class: Actinopterygii
- Order: Cypriniformes
- Family: Cyprinidae
- Genus: Discherodontus
- Species: D. parvus

Binomial name
- Discherodontus parvus (H. W. Wu & R. D. Lin, 1977)

Species of ray-finned fish

Discherodontus parvus is a species of cyprinid in the genus Discherodontus. It inhabits China and is used locally for food.
