= Arabibarbus hadhrami =

Scientific classification
- Domain: Eukaryota
- Kingdom: Animalia
- Phylum: Chordata
- Class: Actinopterygii
- Order: Cypriniformes
- Family: Cyprinidae
- Subfamily: Torinae
- Genus: Arabibarbus
- Species: A. hadhrami

Binomial name
- Arabibarbus hadhrami Borkenhagen, 2014

Species of fish

Arabibarbus hadhrami is a species of ray-finned fish in the genus Arabibarbus. The species is endemic to Yemen, where it is found in the Wadi Hadhramaut / Wadi al Masila drainage basin.
