= Abd al-Salam al-Hadrami =

- عبد السلام الحضرمي
- Died: October 2001
- Military career
- Allegiance: Afghan Taliban

Abd al-Salam al-Hadrami (Arabic: عبد السلام الحضرمي) was the name, likely an alias, of the military commander of the Arab volunteers who fought for the Afghan Taliban against the Northern Alliance, and later briefly against the Americans when they invaded Afghanistan after the September 11, 2001 attacks.

The Arab volunteers, who were in large part from Saudi Arabia and Yemen, but who came from all over the Arab world, numbered in the hundreds. They were organized and deployed in several Arab-only units under the overall command of al-Hadrami, whose toponym suggests that he was originally from Hadhramaut, Yemen. According to the Guantanamo Bay Combatant Status Review board documents for another former Arab fighter, Mustafa al-Shamyri, al-Hadrami helped buy airline tickets for at least some Afghanistan-bound Yemenis who wished to fight for the Taliban.

Al-Hadrami was killed in an air raid shortly after the American invasion in October 2001. He was succeeded as commander of the Arab volunteers by another Yemeni, Gharib al-Sana'ani.
