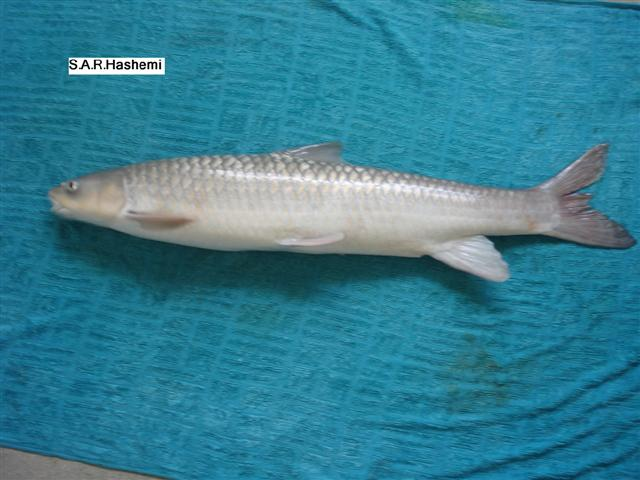
- Arabibarbus grypus

Scientific classification
- Domain: Eukaryota
- Kingdom: Animalia
- Phylum: Chordata
- Class: Actinopterygii
- Order: Cypriniformes
- Family: Cyprinidae
- Subfamily: Torinae
- Genus: Arabibarbus; Borkenhagen, 2014

Type species
- Arabibarbus hadhrami Borkenhagen 2014

= Arabibarbus =

Genus of fishes

Arabibarbus is a genus of Cyprinidae. They are medium-small to very large freshwater carps found in the Western Asia.

== Species ==
The taxonomic position of these species has historically caused considerable confusion and they were formerly placed in Barbus or Tor, although the species described in 2014 was placed in Arabibarbus from the beginning.

There are currently three recognized species of this genus:

- Arabibarbus arabicus (Trewavas, 1941)
- Arabibarbus hadhrami Borkenhagen, 2014
- Arabibarbus grypus (Heckel, 1843) (Shirbot)
