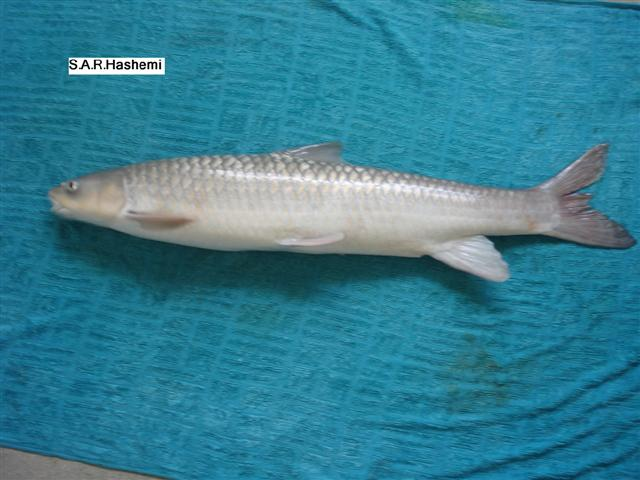
- A 55 cm (2 ft) shabout caught in Iran

Conservation status
- Vulnerable (IUCN 3.1)

Scientific classification
- Kingdom: Animalia
- Phylum: Chordata
- Class: Actinopterygii
- Order: Cypriniformes
- Family: Cyprinidae
- Subfamily: Torinae
- Genus: Arabibarbus
- Species: A. grypus

Binomial name
- Arabibarbus grypus (Heckel, 1843)

Synonyms
- Barbus grypus Heckel, 1843; Tor grypus (Heckel, 1843)

= Shabout =

Species of fish

The shabout (Arabibarbus grypus) is a species of cyprinid fish also called in English, Persian or Arabic by the alternate common names shirbot and variations shabut, shabboot or shabbout, and in local languages by several other common names. It is a large freshwater carp found in Western Asia, where it inhabits the Tigris–Euphrates Basin, as well as Iranian rivers that flow into the Persian Gulf.

This species can grow to a length of up to 1.5 m (4.9 ft) and a weight of 30 kg (66 lb), although there are unconfirmed reports of individuals up to 2 m (6.6 ft) and 100 kg (220 lb), perhaps caused by confusion with the mangar (Luciobarbus esocinus). The shabout supports important fisheries, but has declined because of habitat loss (mostly due to dams, water extraction, drought and pollution) and overfishing.

== Habitat and behavior ==
The shabout inhabits rivers from upstream tributaries to river mouths. However, it is rather adaptable and can also be found in more stagnant waters like marshes and reservoirs, although this strong swimmer prefers slow to moderately flowing waters and it has relatively high oxygen requirements. Adults prefer relatively cool waters (optimum c. 22 °C [72 °F]), and migrate upstream in the summer when the lower reaches of rivers become warm, but smaller individuals stay in the lower parts year-round. Nevertheless, the species has a wide temperature tolerance with wild individuals living in rivers that range at least from 10.2 to 32.8 °C (50–91 °F), and individuals kept in aquaculture at between 8 and 31 °C (46–88 °F). This is a freshwater fish, but it does tolerate slightly brackish waters in estuaries; however, their growth significantly decreases under such conditions.

Shabout breed in the spring and summer. They breed in upstream parts of rivers, generally in places with relatively cool and fast-flowing waters, a depth of no more than 1.5 m (4.9 ft) and a gravel bottom. A female reaches maturity when at least three years old and can lay up to 235,764 eggs, placed among gravel or plants. The species is mostly herbivorous, feeding on a wide range of plant material from algae and macrophytes to fruits and grain. They also feed at lower levels on invertebrates and small fish, with one study suggesting that individuals become more predatory as they reach a large size.

== Fishing ==
It is a commercially fished species. It was proposed that this "shabut" was identical to the fish called "shibuta" (Jewish Babylonian Aramaic: שיבוטא) in the Talmud. The latter's brain is famous for being touted as the kosher equivalent, taste-wise, of the otherwise forbidden and even taboo pork meat (cf. Chullin 109b). However, names of species are notorious for changing over time and between related languages, a fact, incidentally, the Talmud itself attests. The fact that Arabibarbus grypus is called in Modern Hebrew Shibuta is definitely no proof that it is the same fish as the Talmudic one, as Modern Hebrew has a strong tendency to assimilate local Arabic names for such realia.

The shabout is an important target species for commercial fisheries which has been heavily overfished in some parts of its range for many years. In addition, dams have blocked its migration routes and its habitat has been further degraded by water abstraction and pollution. In Iraq its population had declined by 90% between the 1960s and the 2000s, although data from other parts of its range is not available.

The fish is also being considered for aquaculture. Many species of carp are farmed as a protein source already.
