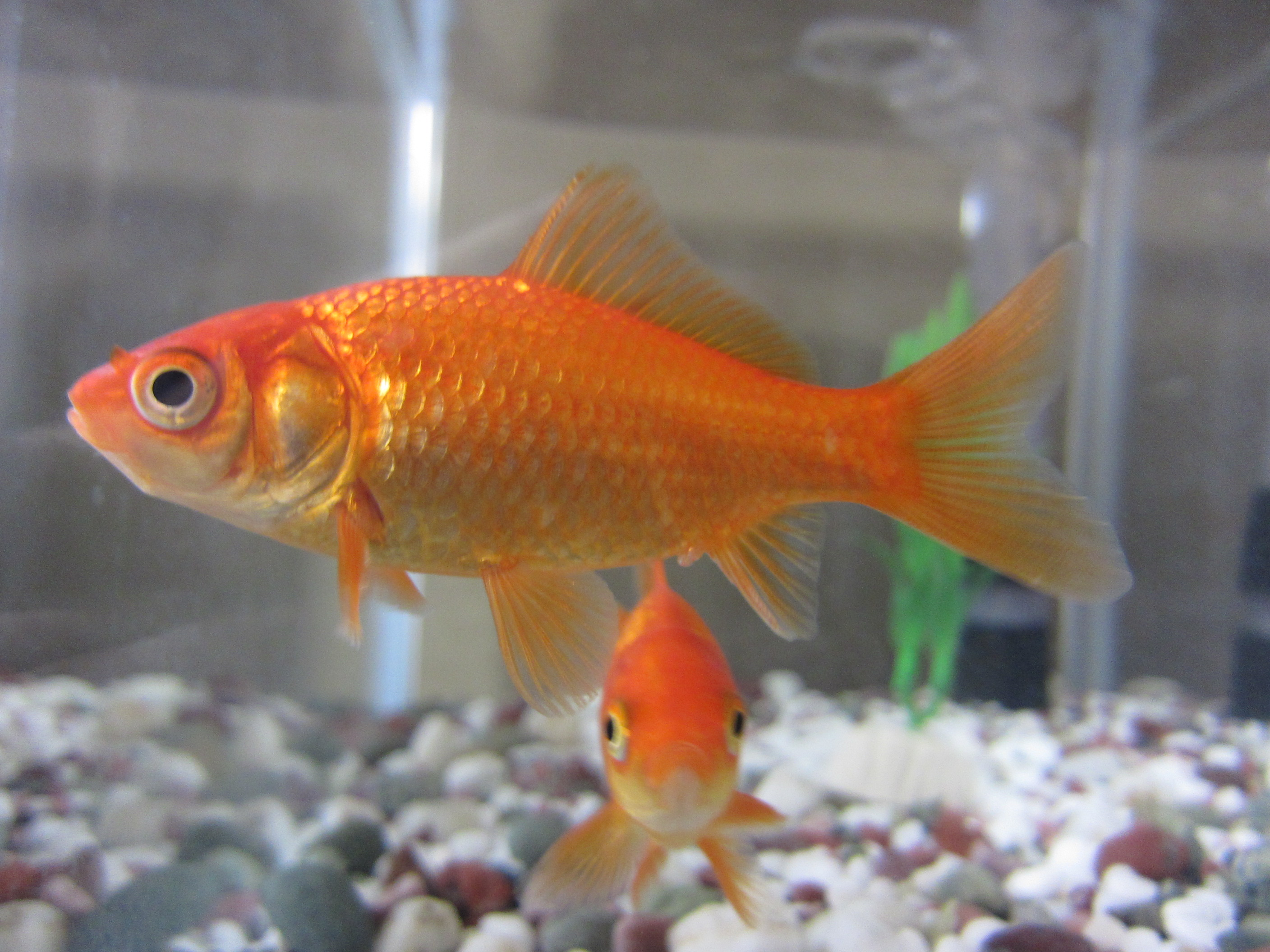
- Goldfish (Carassius auratus)

Scientific classification
- Kingdom: Animalia
- Phylum: Chordata
- Class: Actinopterygii
- Division: Teleostei
- Order: Cypriniformes
- Family: Cyprinidae
- Subfamily: Cyprininae; Rafinesque, 1815

Genera
- See text

= Cyprininae =

Cyprininae Temporal range: Late Eocene to present

Subfamily of fishes

Cyprininae is a subfamily of largely freshwater ray-finned fishes, one of ten subfamilies belonging to the family Cyprinidae. This family comprises the carps, goldfishes, barbs and related genera.

== Genera ==
Cyprinae contains the following recognised extant genera:

- Aaptosyax Rainboth, 1991
- Albulichthys Bleeker, 1860
- Amblyrhynchichthys Bleeker, 1860
- Balantiocheilos Bleeker, 1860
- Carassioides Oshima, 1926
- Carassius Jarocki, 1822
- Cosmochilus Sauvage, 1878
- Cyclocheilichthys Bleeker, 1859
- Cyclocheilos Bleeker, 1859
- Cyprinus Linnaeus, 1758
- Discherodontus Rainboth, 1989
- Eirmotus Schultz, 1959
- Hypsibarbus Rainboth, 1996
- Kalimantania Bănărescu, 1980
- Laocypris Kottelat, 2000
- Luciocyprinus Vaillant, 1904
- Mystacoleucus Günther, 1868
- Neobarynotus Bănărescu, 1980
- Parasikukia Doi, 2000
- Paraspinibarbus X.-L. Chu & Kottelat, 1989
- Parator H. W. Wu, G. R. Yang, P. Q. Yue & H. J. Huang, 1963
- Poropuntius H. M. Smith, 1931
- Procypris S.-Y. Lin, 1933
- Pseudosinocyclocheilus C.-G. Zhang & Y.-H. Zhao, 2016
- Puntioplites H. M. Smith, 1929
- Rohteichthys Bleeker, 1860
- Sawbwa Annandale, 1918
- Scaphognathops H.M. Smith, 1945
- Sikukia H. M. Smith, 1931
- Sinocyclocheilus P.-W. Fang, 1936
- Troglocyclocheilus Kottelat & Bréhier, 1999
- Typhlobarbus X.-L. Chu & W.-R. Chen, 1982

The following extinct genera have also been included within the Cyprininae:

- †Eoprocypris (1 fossil species)
- †Huashancyprinus (1 fossil species)
- †Palaeocarassius (4 fossil species)

== Subdivisions ==
This giant subfamily has been further divided into tribes.

Two controversial subfamilies are nested inside Cyprininae: Barbinae and Labeoninae. The former is now very poorly defined due to the proximity of Barbus barbus to Cyprinus. The latter can still form a distinct-enough clade to be known as tribe Labeonini when subsumed inside this subfamily.

Sinocyclocheilus, Cyprinus, and Carassius are known to share an allotetraploidization event. The latter two are classified as tribe Cyprinini sensu Rainboth 1981.

== Gallery ==
Gallery
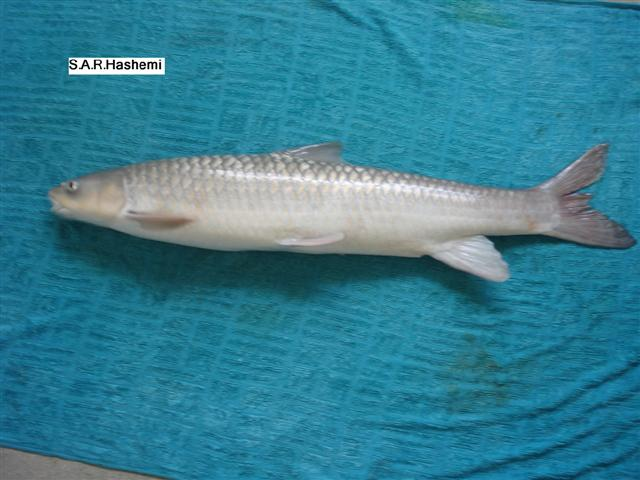
Arabibarbus grypus (Arabibarbus)

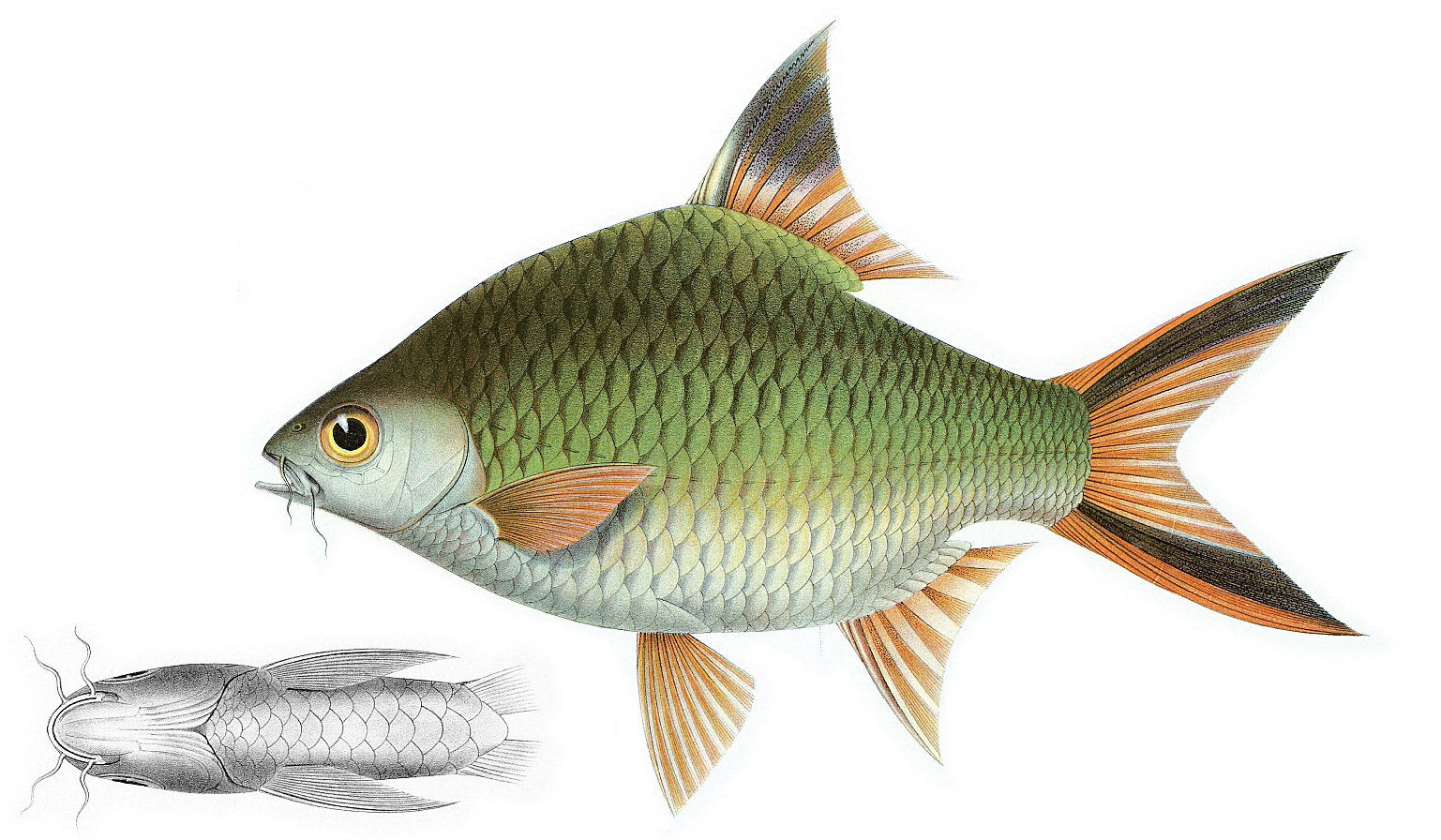
Barbonymus schwanenfeldii (Barbonymus)

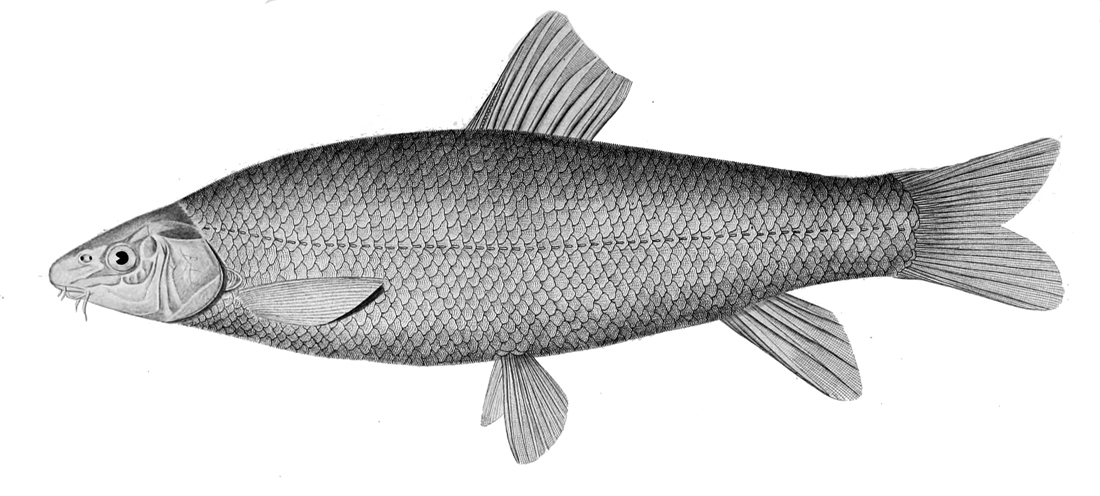
Capoeta capoeta (Capoeta)

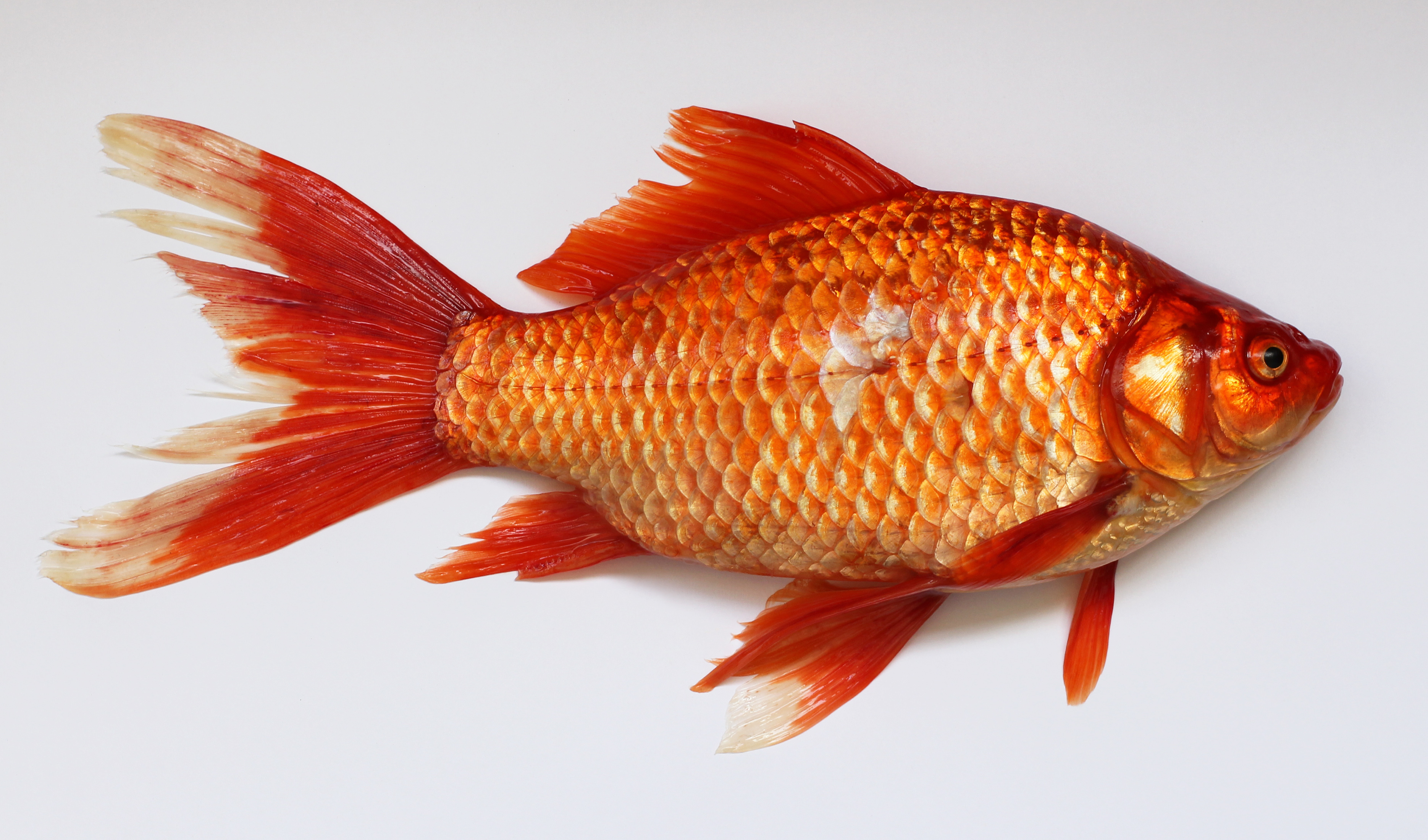
Carassius gibelio (Carassius)

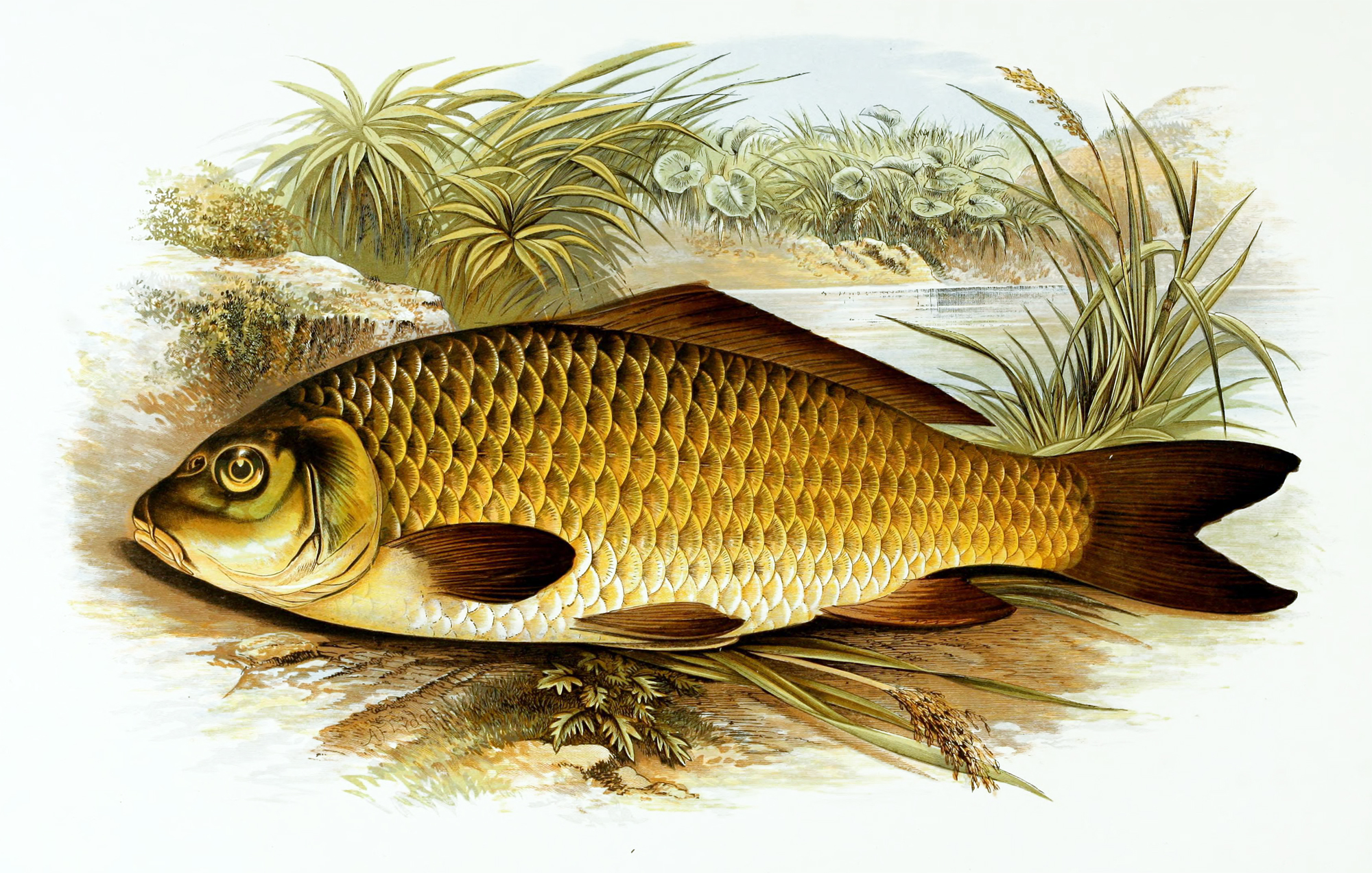
Cyprinus carpio (Cyprinus)

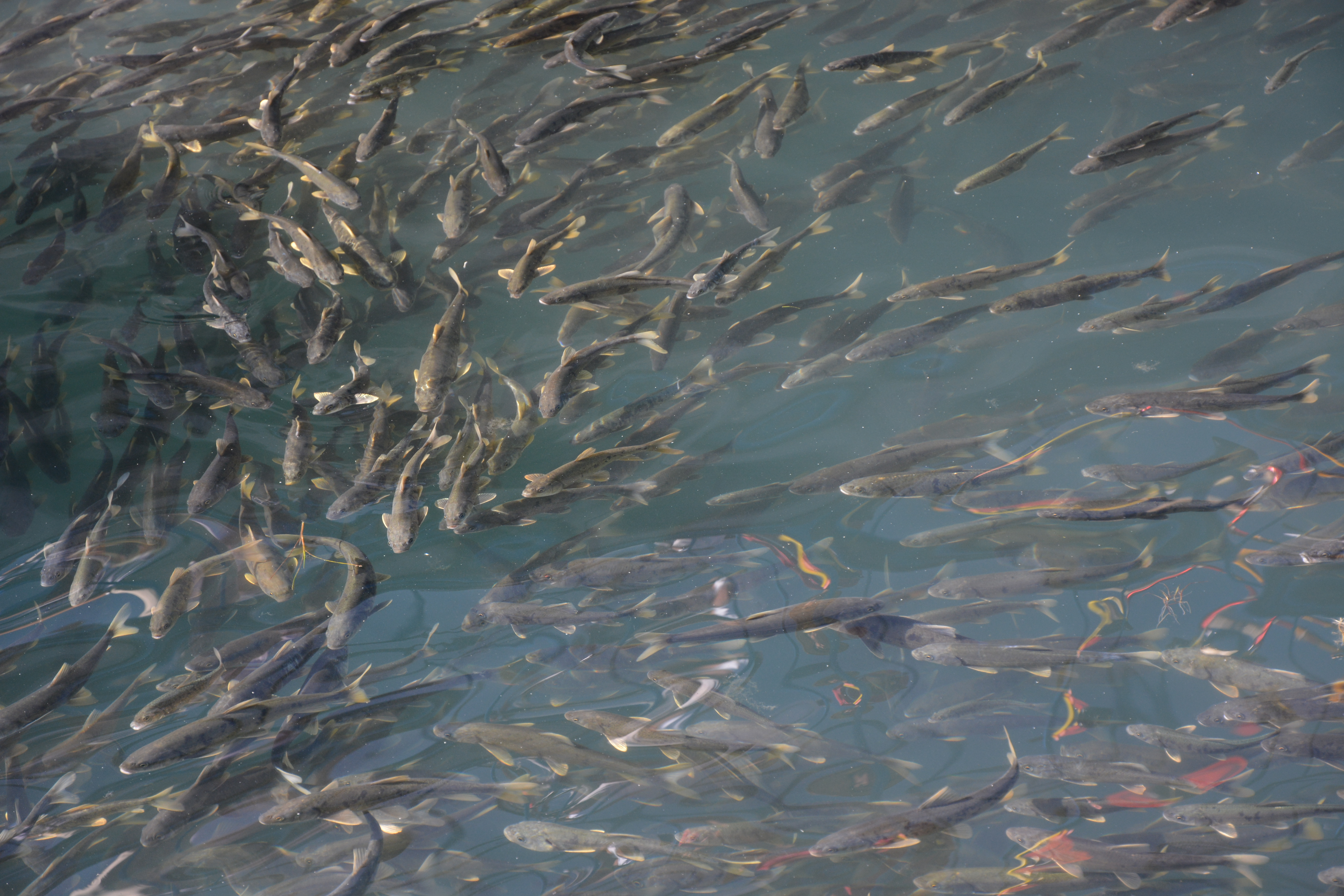
Gymnocypris przewalskii (Gymnocypris)

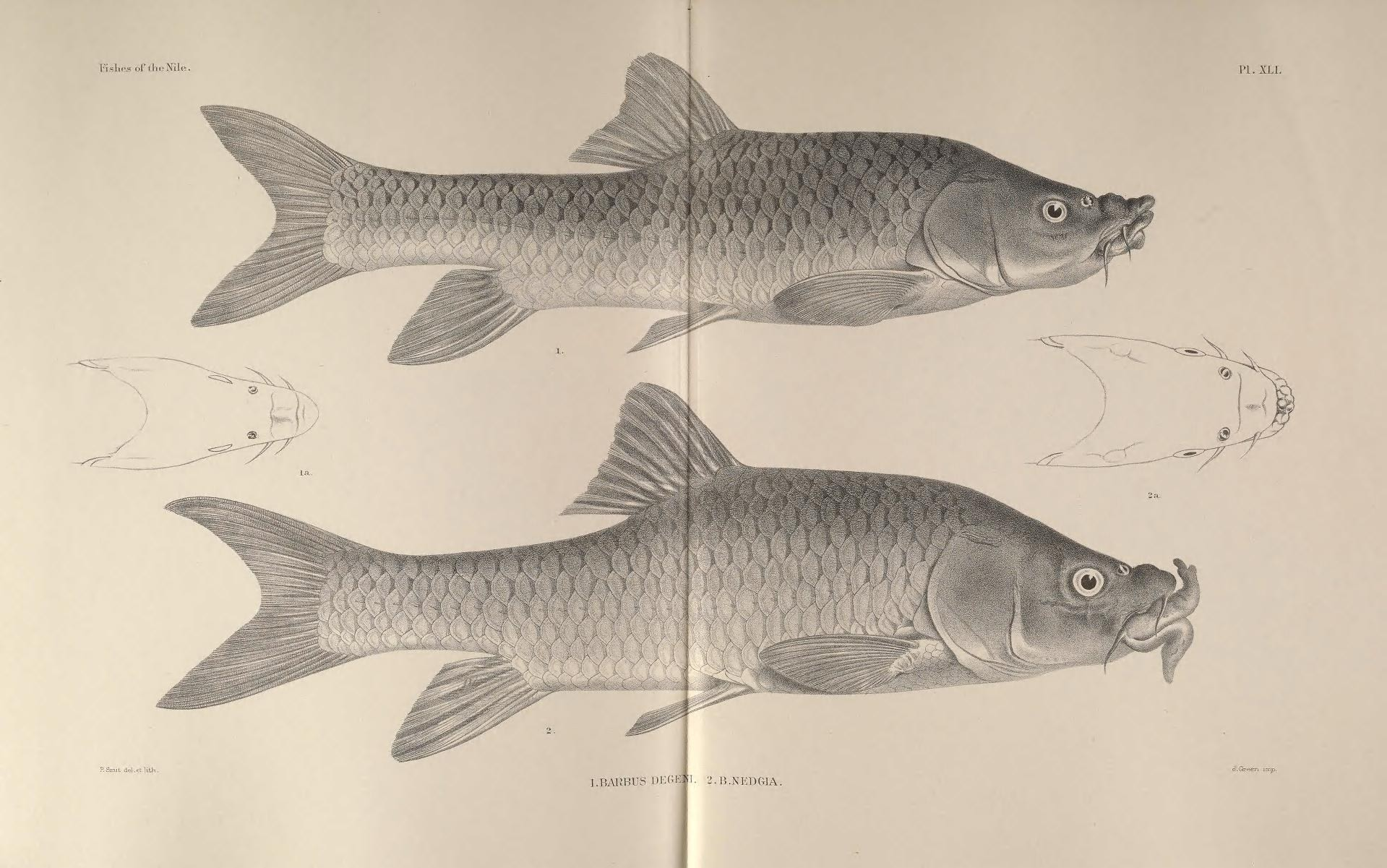
Labeobarbus nedgia (Labeobarbus)

Media related to Cyprininae at Wikimedia Commons
