= List of Indian state fishes =

State fish are official symbols adopted by the states and union territories of India, alongside state animals, birds, flowers and trees. The National Fisheries Development Board (NFDB) compiles the designations in its State Fishes and Aquatic Animals of India at a Glance.

This list covers state fish designations. States and union territories that have designated a state aquatic animal or state animal rather than a state fish are listed separately below. The NFDB compilation, current to 21 November 2023, is supplemented by later state notifications: Punjab declared rohu in October 2025, Jharkhand declared desi magur in November 2025, and Meghalaya declared chocolate mahseer in May 2026.

== State fish ==
State fish of India
State or union territory	Local name	Common name	Scientific name	Image	Notes
Andhra Pradesh	Korramenu	Striped murrel	Channa striata		
Arunachal Pradesh	—	Golden mahseer	Tor putitora		
Bihar	Mangur	Indian walking catfish	Clarias magur		The NFDB lists the species as Clarias magur, formerly included in C. batrachus.
Goa	Shevtto	Striped grey mullet	Mugil cephalus		Declared in 2016.
Gujarat	Ghol	Blackspotted croaker	Protonibea diacanthus		Declared on 21 November 2023 at the Global Fisheries Conference India in Ahmedabad.
Haryana	—	Orangefin labeo	Labeo calbasu		
Himachal Pradesh	—	Golden mahseer	Tor putitora		
Jammu and Kashmir	—	Golden mahseer	Tor putitora		
Jharkhand	Desi magur	Indian walking catfish	Clarias magur		Declared in November 2025.
Karnataka	Korachi	Carnatic carp	Hypselobarbus carnaticus		The NFDB lists the species as Barbodes carnaticus.
Kerala	Karimeen	Green chromide	Etroplus suratensis		
Madhya Pradesh	—	Narmada mahseer	Tor tor		
Maharashtra	Paplet	Silver pomfret	Pampus candidus		Declared in 2023. The NFDB lists the species as Pampus candidus, formerly P. argenteus.
Manipur	Pengba	Pengba	Osteobrama belangeri		
Meghalaya	Khasaw (Khasi), Na-rang (Garo)	Chocolate mahseer	Neolissochilus hexagonolepis		Declared in May 2026.
Mizoram	Ngahvang	Burmese kingfish	Semiplotus modestus		
Nagaland	—	Chocolate mahseer	Neolissochilus hexagonolepis		
Odisha	—	Mahanadi mahseer	Tor mahanadicus		
Punjab	Rohu	Rohu	Labeo rohita		Declared on 31 October 2025. The Indus river dolphin remains the state aquatic animal.
Sikkim	Katley	Copper mahseer	Neolissochilus hexagonolepis		Declared in 2021.
Telangana	Korramenu	Striped murrel	Channa striata		
Tripura	Pabda	Indian butter catfish	Ompok bimaculatus		
Uttar Pradesh	Chital	Indian featherback	Chitala chitala		The state also has a separate state aquatic animal, the Ganges river dolphin.
Uttarakhand	Mahseer	Golden mahseer	Tor putitora		Adopted in 2001.
West Bengal	Ilish	Hilsa	Tenualosa ilisha		

== Related aquatic animal designations ==
The following table lists national and state aquatic animal designations. Several states and union territories have designated a state aquatic animal or state animal rather than a state fish. These are not state-fish designations: the dolphins and the dugong are mammals, while Lakshadweep's threadfin butterflyfish is a fish designated as the state animal.

State aquatic animals and related designations
State, union territory or country	Designation	Species	Image	Notes
India	National aquatic animal	Ganges river dolphin (Platanista gangetica)		A mammal.
Assam	State aquatic animal	Ganges river dolphin (Platanista gangetica)		A mammal.
Punjab	State aquatic animal	Indus river dolphin (Platanista minor)		Punjab also declared rohu as its state fish in 2025.
Uttar Pradesh	State aquatic animal	Ganges river dolphin (Platanista gangetica)		In addition to the state fish.
Andaman and Nicobar Islands	State animal	Dugong (Dugong dugon)		A marine mammal designated as the state animal.
Lakshadweep	State animal	Threadfin butterflyfish (Chaetodon auriga)		A marine fish designated as the state animal, not as a state fish.

== See also ==
- List of Indian state symbols
- List of Indian state animals
- List of Indian state birds
- List of Indian state flowers
- List of Indian state trees
- List of fishes of India
