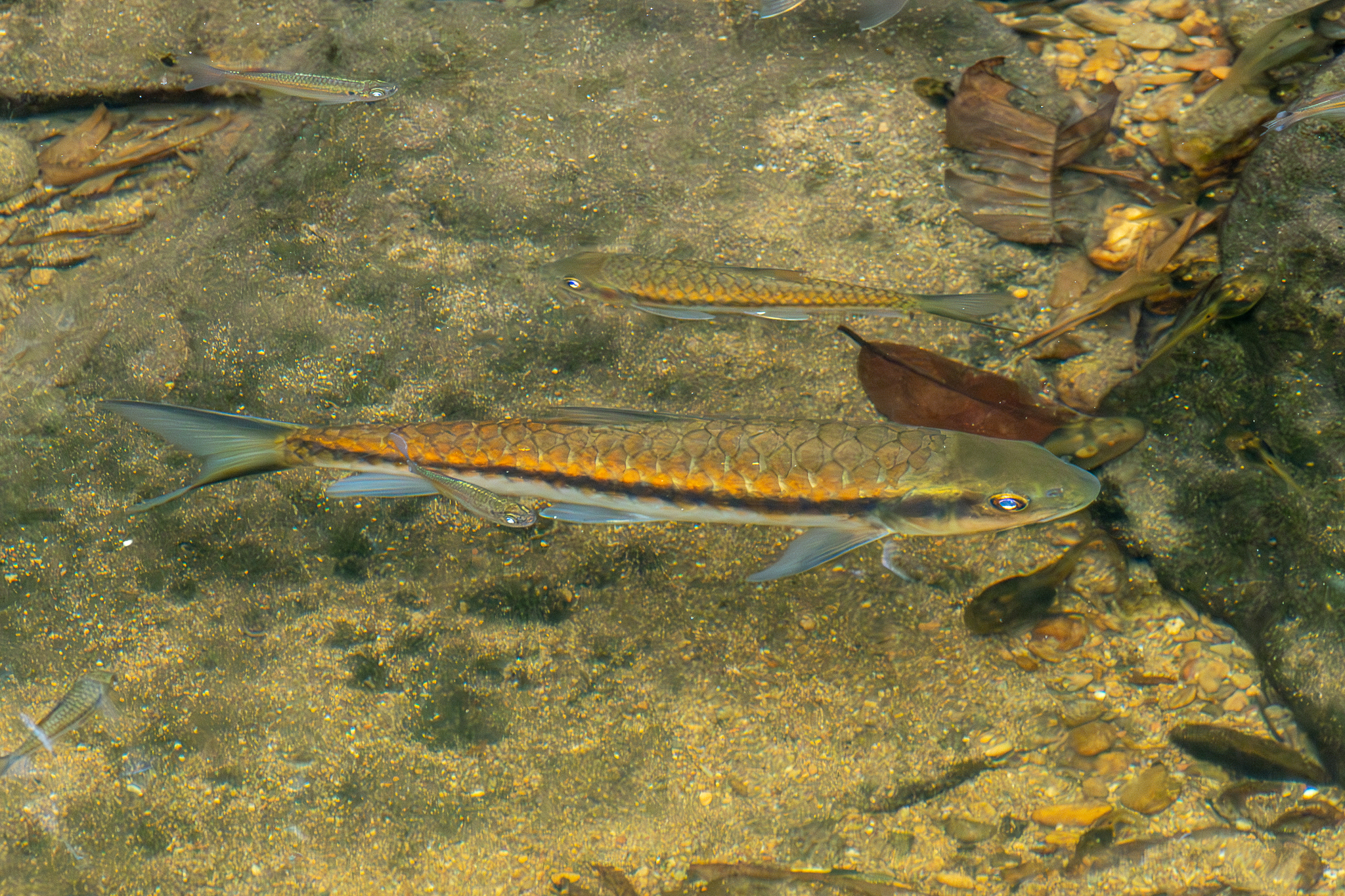
- Neolissochilus stracheyi
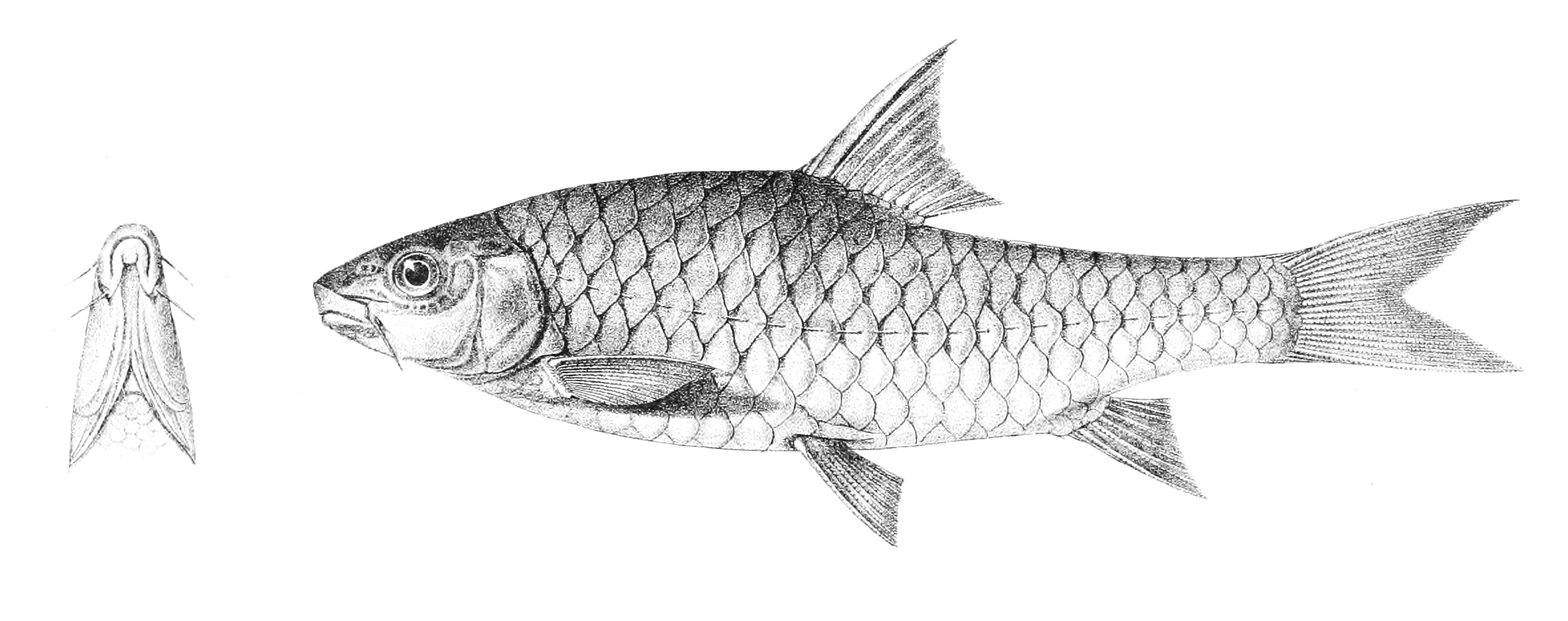
- Neolissochilus hexastichus

Scientific classification
- Kingdom: Animalia
- Phylum: Chordata
- Class: Actinopterygii
- Order: Cypriniformes
- Family: Cyprinidae
- Subfamily: Torinae
- Genus: Neolissochilus; Rainboth, 1985

Type species
- Barbus stracheyi Day, 1871

Synonyms
- Lissochilus Weber & de Beaufort 1916 (preoccupied)

= Neolissochilus =

Genus of fishes

Neolissochilus is a genus of fish in the family Cyprinidae native to freshwater habitats in Asia that are often grouped with the mahseers. The largest reach up to 1.2 m (3.9 ft) in length, but most species are much smaller.

== Species ==
These are the currently recognized species in this genus:

- Neolissochilus acutirostris Arunachalam, Sivakumar & Murugan, 2017
- Neolissochilus baoshanensis (X. Y. Chen & J. X. Yang, 1999) (Baoshan)
- Neolissochilus benasi (Pellegrin & Chevey, 1936)
- Neolissochilus blanci (Pellegrin & P. W. Fang, 1940)
- Neolissochilus blythii (Day, 1870)
- Neolissochilus capudelphinus Arunachalam, Sivakumar & Murugan, 2017
- Neolissochilus compressus (Day, 1870)
- Neolissochilus dukai (Day, 1878)
- Neolissochilus hemispinus (X. Y. Chen & J. X. Yang, 1985).
- Neolissochilus hendersoni (Herre, 1940)
- Neolissochilus heterostomus (Chen & Yang, 1999)
- Neolissochilus hexagonolepis (McClelland 1839) (Copper mahseer or Katli)
- Neolissochilus hexastichus (McClelland, 1839)
- Neolissochilus kaladanensis Lalramliana, Lalronunga, Kumar & Singh, 2019
- Neolissochilus longipinnis (M. C. W. Weber & de Beaufort, 1916)
- Neolissochilus micropthalmus Arunachalam, Sivakumar & Murugan, 2017
- Neolissochilus minimus Arunachalam, Sivakumar & Murugan, 2017
- Neolissochilus nigrovittatus (Boulenger, 1893)
- Neolissochilus paucisquamatus (H. M. Smith, 1945)
- Neolissochilus pnar Dahanukar, Sundar, Rangad, Proudlove & Raghavan, 2023
- Neolissochilus qiaojiensis (H. W. Wu, 1977)
- Neolissochilus soro (Valenciennes, 1842)
- Neolissochilus soroides (Duncker, 1904) (Soro brook varp)
- Neolissochilus spinulosus (McClelland, 1845) (Spinulosus mahseer)
- Neolissochilus stevensonii (Day, 1870)
- Neolissochilus stracheyi (Day, 1871)
- Neolissochilus subterraneus Vidthayanon & Kottelat, 2003 (Cave brook carp)
- Neolissochilus sumatranus (Weber & de Beaufort, 1916)
- Neolissochilus tamiraparaniensis Arunachalam, Sivakumar & Murugan, 2017
- Neolissochilus thienemanni (Ahl 1933) (Ihan)
- Neolissochilus vittatus (H. M. Smith, 1945)
- Neolissochilus wynaadensis (Day, 1873) (Wayanad mahseer)

The following cladogram is based on a phylogenetic tree rendered by maximum likelihood analysis of the first concatenated dataset from a 2024 study, with undescribed species being left unnamed or marked with cf.:

- - Hypselobarbus thomassi
  - Hypselobarbus jerdoni
- - - Varicorhinus maroccanus
    - Labeobarbus intermedius
  - - Neolissochilus benasi
    - - Tor spp.
      - ⊞Neolissochilus spp.
        ⊟
        - - - Neolissochilus wynaadensis
            - - Neolissochilus hexagonolepis (Motuo)
              - - - Neolissochilus hexagonolepis (India)
                  - - Neolissochilus hexastichus (India)
                    - Neolissochilus hexagonolepis (India)
                - - Neolissochilus hexastichus (India)
                  - Neolissochilus pnar
          - - Neolissochilus kaladanensis
            - - Neolissochilus stracheyi (BD)
              - - Neolissochilus cf. dukai (Kaladan drainage, Matupi, Myanmar)
                - Neolissochilus stevensonii
        - - - - Tor hemispinus
              - Neolissochilus hemispinus
            - - Tor qiaojiensis
              - Neolissochilus qiaojiensis
          - - Neolissochilus nigrovittatus
            - - - Neolissochilus soroides
                - - Neolissochilus hendersoni (West Malaysia)
                  - - Neolissochilus soroides (West Malaysia)
                    - - Neolissochilus soroides
                      - Neolissochilus hendersoni (Irrawaddy)
              - - - Neolissochilus cf. stracheyi (Irrawaddy)
                  - - - Neolissochilus stracheyi (India)
                      - Neolissochilus cf. vittatus (Myanmar)
                    - Neolissochilus cf. baoshanensis (Myanmar)
                - - Neolissochilus heterostomus
                  - - Neolissochilus compressus
                    - - - Neolissochilus stracheyi (Mekong, Laos)
                        - - Neolissochilus blanci (Dien Bien Province, Laos)
                          - Neolssochilus stracheyi (Mekong, Laos)
                      - - Neolissochilus stracheyi (Irrawaddy)
                        - Neolissochilus baoshanensis
