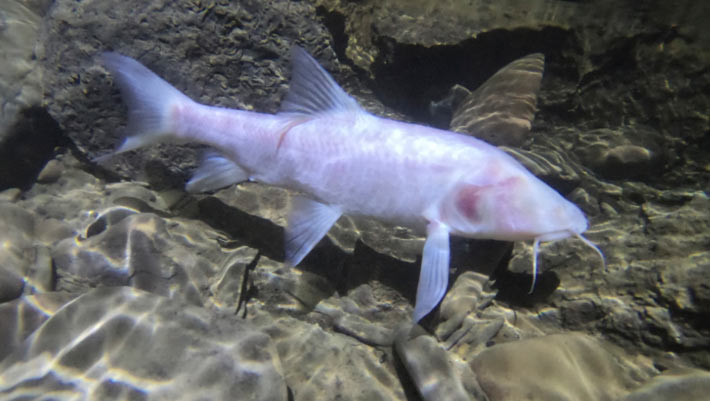

Scientific classification
- Kingdom: Animalia
- Phylum: Chordata
- Class: Actinopterygii
- Division: Teleostei
- Order: Cypriniformes
- Family: Cyprinidae
- Genus: Neolissochilus
- Species: N. pnar

Binomial name
- Neolissochilus pnar Dahanukar, Sundar, Rangad, Proudlove & Raghavan, 2023

= Neolissochilus pnar =

Species of fish

Neolissochilus pnar is a species of subterranean cyprinid in the genus Neolissochilus. It is the largest known subterranean fish, a title formerly held by the blind cave eel.

== Discovery and naming ==
N. pnar was first observed in the 1990s, and only collected and photographed for study in 2019. However stories of 'white cavefish' within the Siju Caves in the Garo Hills of Meghalaya have been documented for a century and suggested to be slightly decolorized specimens of Neolissochilus hexastichus which appeared white when seen in water under torch light. It was tentatively identified as a troglobitic form of golden mahseer, but more detailed analyses have found it to belong in the genus Neolissochilus.

The specific name pnar honors the sub-tribal group of the Khasi people in the state of Meghalaya of the same name.

== Description ==
The holotype specimen of N. pnar is 329.2 mm (12.96 in) long, & the largest individual sighted in its natural cave habitat exceeded 400 mm (16 in) in standard length, making this species the largest known subterranean fish. The head of this fish is large, accounting for a bit over a quarter of its length, and has two pairs of barbels. All fins of N. pnar are hyaline and translucent. This species is white or pinkish in color, with no pigmentation from melanophores. The eye size in this species reduces as overall body size increases: in the largest individuals they cannot be discerned without very close inspection, whilst the eyes of smaller juveniles are clearly visible large dark spots under the skin surface. N. pnar has a continuous lateral lines with 28–31 perforated scales, as well as an additional 1–2 on the caudal fin base.

The species' mitogenome is 16440 base pairs long.

== Ecology and habitat ==
N. pnar has been collected from the Krem Um Ladaw and the adjacent Krem Chympe caves in Meghalaya, Northeast India, which drain into the Meghna River System. The entrance to the Krem Um Ladaw cave lies in a seasonally dry stream bed within a forest, and the cave floor is rocky with several pools of standing water. Forest vegetation make up part of the debris along the floor, indicating the cave is seasonally flooded, & this seasonal flood debris may provide the main food source for the fish. No major bat roosts or bat guano deposits are present in Krem Um Ladaw, but there are various invertebrates including brown crickets (Eutachycines sp.), cellar spiders (Pholcidae), fungus gnat larvae (Keroplatidae), isopods such as Cubaris sp. and Philoscia sp., shrimp (Macrobrachium cf. cavernicola), snails (Paludomus sp.), pond skaters (Gerridae), and a few tadpoles.

In the Krem Chympe cave, N. pnar occurs in pools in a side passage alongside fish (Garra sp.), shrimps (Macrobrachium sp.), and tadpoles.
