= Hypselobarbus pseudomussullah =

Scientific classification
- Kingdom: Animalia
- Phylum: Chordata
- Class: Actinopterygii
- Order: Cypriniformes
- Family: Cyprinidae
- Genus: Hypselobarbus
- Species: H. pseudomussullah

Binomial name
- Hypselobarbus pseudomussullah Arunachalam, Chinnaraja & Mayden, 2016

Species of fish

Hypselobarbus pseudomussullah is a species of cyprinid in the genus Hypselobarbus. It inhabits Karnataka and Maharashtra, India, and has a maximum length of 24.1 centimetres (9.5 in).
