= Hypselobarbus bicolor =

Scientific classification
- Kingdom: Animalia
- Phylum: Chordata
- Class: Actinopterygii
- Order: Cypriniformes
- Family: Cyprinidae
- Genus: Hypselobarbus
- Species: H. bicolor

Binomial name
- Hypselobarbus bicolor Knight, Rai, d'Souza, Philip & Dahanukar 2016

Species of fish

Hypselobarbus bicolor is a species of cyprinid in the genus Hypselobarbus. Its habitat is in the Indian Western Ghats and it was described in 2016.
