= Neolissochilus longipinnis =

Conservation status
- Data Deficient (IUCN 3.1)

Scientific classification
- Kingdom: Animalia
- Phylum: Chordata
- Class: Actinopterygii
- Order: Cypriniformes
- Family: Cyprinidae
- Genus: Neolissochilus
- Species: N. longipinnis

Binomial name
- Neolissochilus longipinnis (M. C. W. Weber & de Beaufort, 1916)

Synonyms
- Labeobarbus longipinnis Weber & de Beaufort, 1916; Tor longipinnis (Weber & de Beaufort, 1916)

Species of fish

Neolissochilus longipinnis is a species of freshwater ray-finned fish belonging to the family Cyprinidae, the family which includes the carps, barbs and related fishes. It inhabits Lake Kawar on Sumatra, and is possibly found in the Pangus River drainage of Mount Ungaran on Java, though this population has probably been extirpated. It has a maximum length of 47.5 centimetres (18.7 in).
