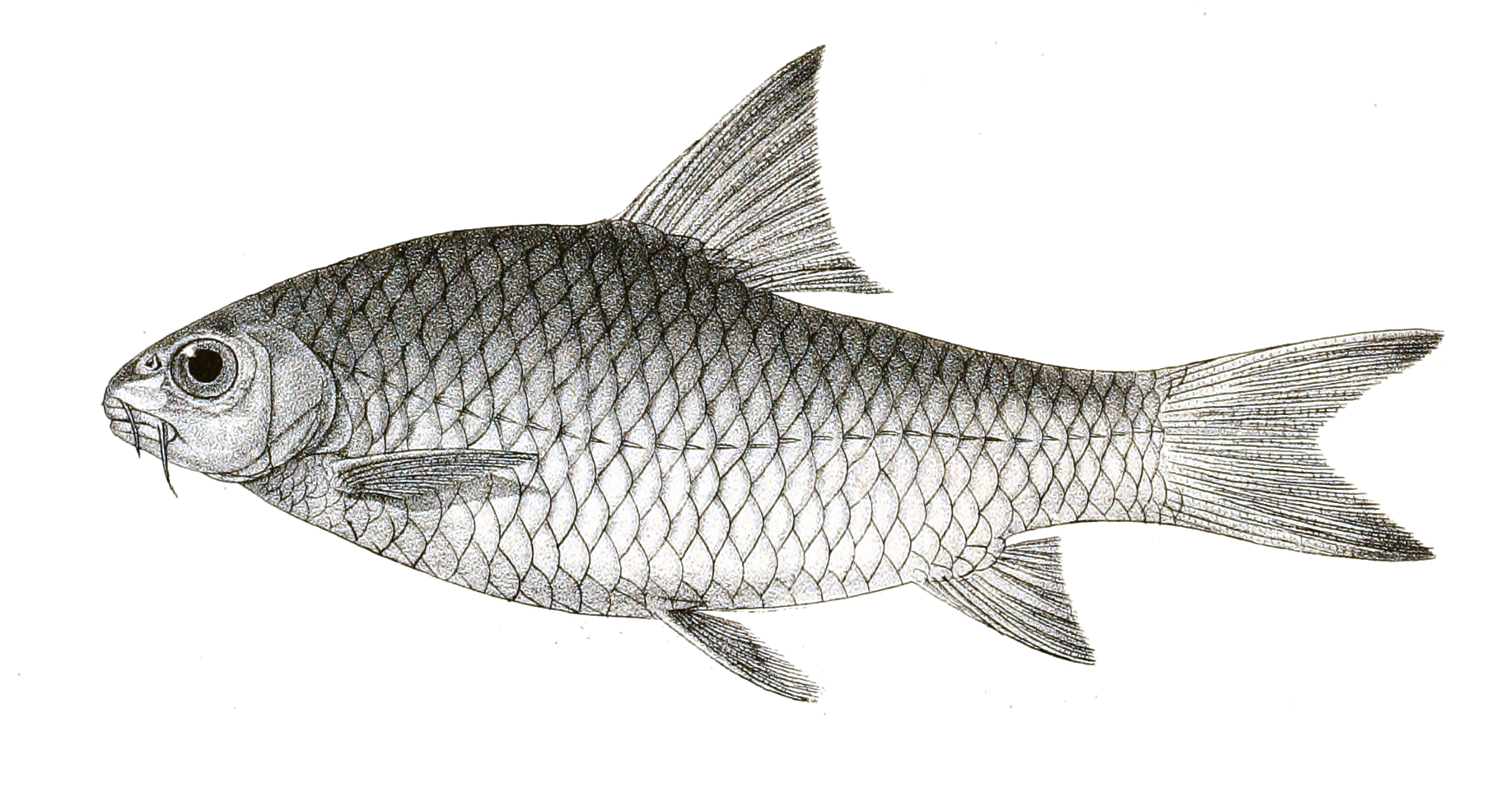

Conservation status
- Data Deficient (IUCN 3.1)

Scientific classification
- Kingdom: Animalia
- Phylum: Chordata
- Class: Actinopterygii
- Order: Cypriniformes
- Family: Cyprinidae
- Genus: Hypselobarbus
- Species: H. dobsoni

Binomial name
- Hypselobarbus dobsoni (F. Day, 1876)

Synonyms
- Barbus dobsoni Day, 1876; Puntius dobsoni (Day, 1876)

= Krishna carp =

Species of fish

Krishna Carp (Hypselobarbus dobsoni) is a species of ray-finned fish in the genus Hypselobarbus. They are found in parts of India. They are usually around 18.7 cm (7.36 inches).

== Footnotes ==
- Froese, Rainer; Pauly, Daniel (eds.). "Hypselobarbus dobsoni". FishBase.
