= Hypselobarbus kolus =

Kolus barb

Conservation status
- Vulnerable (IUCN 3.1)

Scientific classification
- Kingdom: Animalia
- Phylum: Chordata
- Class: Actinopterygii
- Order: Cypriniformes
- Family: Cyprinidae
- Genus: Hypselobarbus
- Species: H. kolus

Binomial name
- Hypselobarbus kolus (Sykes, 1839)

Synonyms
- Barbus kolus Sykes, 1839; Barbus kolus Sykes, 1839; Gonoproktopterus kolus (Sykes, 1839)

Species of fish

Hypselobarbus kolus (kolus barb) is a species of ray-finned fish in the genus Hypselobarbus which is endemic to the Western Ghats in southern India in the states of Kerala, Karnataka, Tamil Nadu and Maharashtra. It has been recorded from the rivers Chalakudy, Periyar, Muvattupuzha and Karamana, Linganamakki Dam on the Sharavathi River, Krishna River, Thamirabarani, Bhima River, Godavari and Bhadra.

It is found in fast flowing streams and in reservoirs in the middle and upper stretches of rivers and is known to breed following the monsoon, the breeding adults develop bright colours. It is threatened by human activities such as destructive fishing practices, sand mining, siltation, urbanization and deforestation, as well as overfishing in some parts of its range.

== Footnotes ==
- Froese, Rainer; Pauly, Daniel (eds.). "Hypselobarbus kolus". FishBase.
