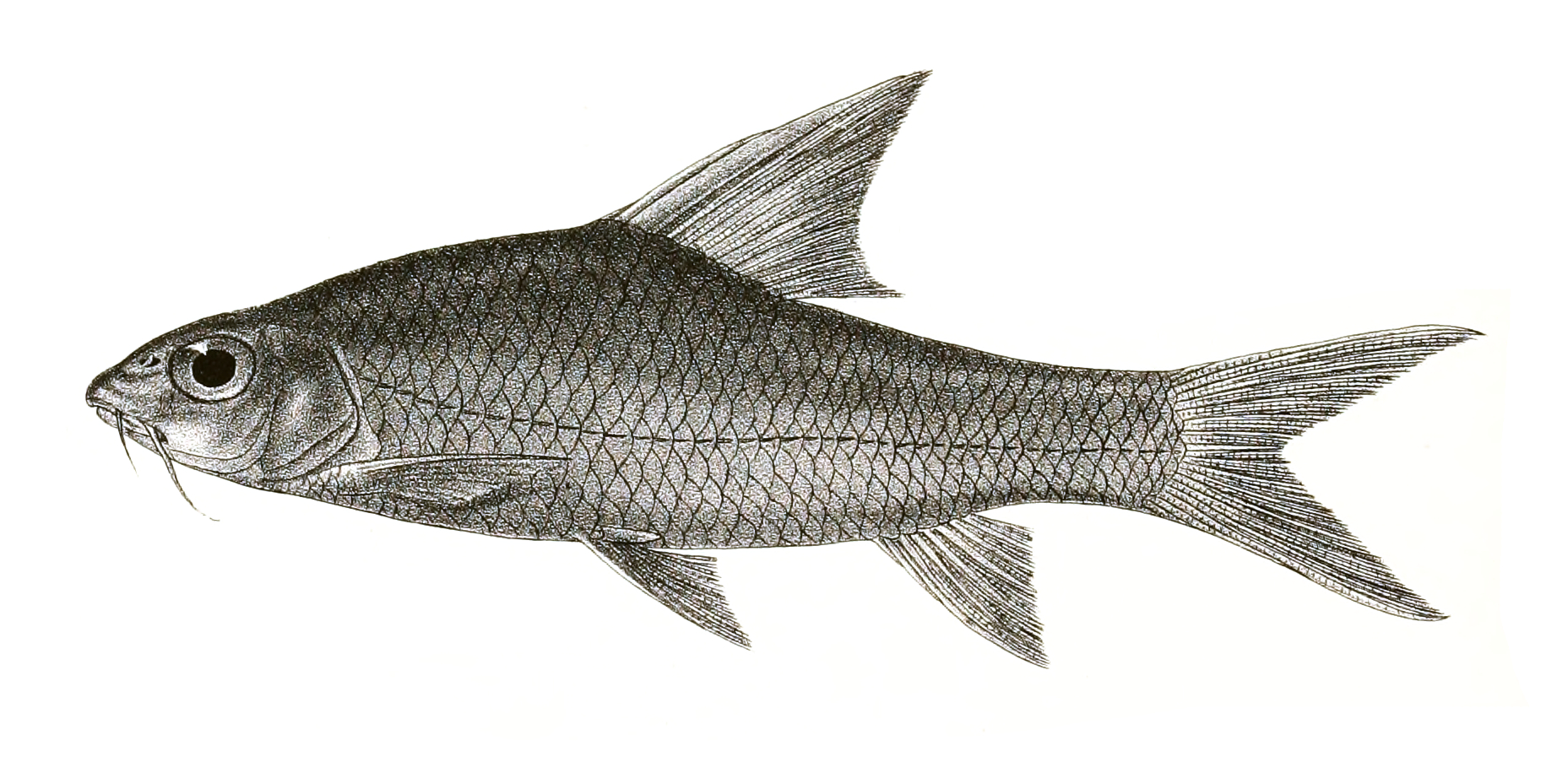

Conservation status
- Endangered (IUCN 3.1)

Scientific classification
- Kingdom: Animalia
- Phylum: Chordata
- Class: Actinopterygii
- Order: Cypriniformes
- Family: Cyprinidae
- Genus: Hypselobarbus
- Species: H. micropogon

Binomial name
- Hypselobarbus micropogon (Valenciennes, 1842)

Synonyms
- Barbus micropogon Valenciennes, 1842; Gonoproktopterus micropogon (Valenciennes, 1842); Puntius micropogon (Valenciennes, 1842)

= Korhi barb =

Species of fish

Hypselobarbus micropogon, the Korhi barb, is a species of cyprinid fish from India where it is restricted to the headwaters of Kaveri.

== Footnotes ==
- Froese, Rainer; Pauly, Daniel (eds.). "Hypselobarbus micropogon". FishBase.
