= Neolissochilus sumatranus =

Conservation status
- Least Concern (IUCN 3.1)

Scientific classification
- Kingdom: Animalia
- Phylum: Chordata
- Class: Actinopterygii
- Order: Cypriniformes
- Family: Cyprinidae
- Genus: Neolissochilus
- Species: N. sumatranus

Binomial name
- Neolissochilus sumatranus (M. C. W. Weber & de Beaufort, 1916)

Species of fish

Neolissochilus sumatranus is a species of cyprinid in the genus Neolissochilus. It inhabits Thailand and Sumatra, Indonesia and has a maximum length of 14.8 centimetres (5.8 in).
