= Hypselobarbus nilgiriensis =

Scientific classification
- Kingdom: Animalia
- Phylum: Chordata
- Class: Actinopterygii
- Order: Cypriniformes
- Family: Cyprinidae
- Genus: Hypselobarbus
- Species: H. nilgiriensis

Binomial name
- Hypselobarbus nilgiriensis Arunachalam, Chinnaraja & Mayden, 2016

Species of fish

Hypselobarbus nilgiriensis is a species of cyprinid in the genus Hypselobarbus. It inhabits India and its maximum length is 32.3 centimetres (12.7 in).
