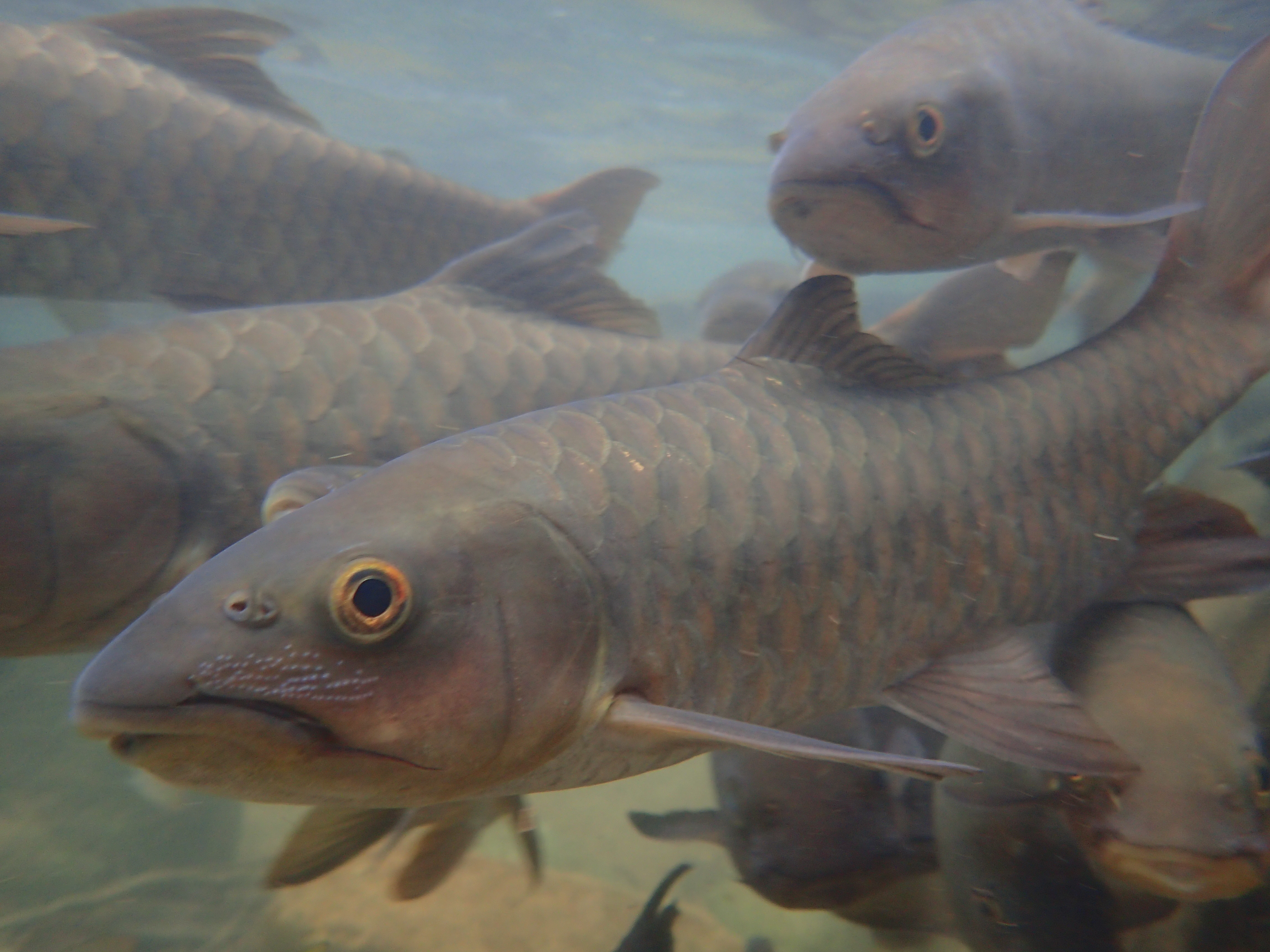
- School of Neolissochilus stracheyi in Namtok Phlio National Park, Chanthaburi Province, Eastern Thailand.

Conservation status
- Least Concern (IUCN 3.1)

Scientific classification
- Kingdom: Animalia
- Phylum: Chordata
- Class: Actinopterygii
- Order: Cypriniformes
- Family: Cyprinidae
- Genus: Neolissochilus
- Species: N. stracheyi

Binomial name
- Neolissochilus stracheyi (Day, 1871)

Synonyms
- Barbus stracheyi Day, 1871; Labeobarbus stracheyi (Day, 1871); Tor stracheyi (Day, 1871)

= Neolissochilus stracheyi =

Species of fish

Neolissochilus stracheyi is a species of cyprinid in the genus Neolissochilus. It inhabits Myanmar and Thailand and has a maximum length of 60 centimetres (24 in).
