= List of Indian state animals =

India, officially the Republic of India is a country in South Asia, consisting of 28 states and eight union territories. All Indian states and some of the union territories have their own elected government and the union territories come under the jurisdiction of the Central Government. India has its own national symbols. Apart from the national symbols, the states and union territories have adopted their own seals and symbols including animals listed below.

== States ==
List of Indian state animals
State	Common name	Binomial name	Image	IUCN category
Andhra Pradesh	Blackbuck	Antilope cervicapra		Least Concern
Arunachal Pradesh	Gayal	Bos frontalis		Vulnerable
Assam	One-horned rhinoceros	Rhinoceros unicornis		Vulnerable
Bihar	Gaur	Bos gaurus		Vulnerable
Chhattisgarh	Wild water buffalo	Bubalus arnee		Endangered
Goa	Gaur	Bos gaurus		Vulnerable
Gujarat	Asiatic lion	Panthera leo		Endangered
Haryana	Blackbuck	Antilope cervicapra		Least Concern
Himachal Pradesh	Snow leopard	Panthera uncia		Vulnerable
Jharkhand	Indian elephant	Elephas maximus		Endangered
Karnataka	Indian elephant	Elephas maximus		Endangered
Kerala	Indian elephant	Elephas maximus		Endangered
Madhya Pradesh	Swamp deer	Rucervus duvaucelii		Vulnerable
Maharashtra	Indian giant squirrel	Ratufa indica		Least Concern
Manipur	Sangai	Cervus eldi		Endangered
Meghalaya	Clouded leopard	Neofelis nebulosa		Vulnerable
Mizoram	Himalayan serow	Capricornis thar		Vulnerable
Nagaland	Gayal	Bos frontalis		Vulnerable
Odisha	Sambar	Rusa unicolor		Vulnerable
Punjab	Blackbuck	Antilope cervicapra		Least Concern
Rajasthan	Chinkara	Gazella bennettii		Least Concern
Sikkim	Red panda	Ailurus fulgens		Endangered
Tamil Nadu	Nilgiri tahr	Nilgiritragus hylocrius		Endangered
Telangana	Spotted deer	Axis axis		Least Concern
Tripura	Phayre's langur	Trachypithecus phayrei		Endangered
Uttar Pradesh	Swamp deer	Rucervus duvaucelii		Vulnerable
Uttarakhand	Alpine musk deer	Moschus chrysogaster		Endangered
West Bengal	Fishing cat	Prionailurus viverrinus		Vulnerable

== Union territories ==
List of Indian state animals (Union territories)
Union territory	Common name	Binomial name	Image	IUCN category
Andaman and Nicobar Islands	Dugong	Dugong dugon		Vulnerable
Chandigarh	Indian gray mongoose	Herpestes edwardsi		Least Concern
Delhi	Nilgai	Boselaphus tragocamelus		Least Concern
Jammu and Kashmir	Hangul	Cervus hanglu		Critically Endangered
Ladakh	Snow leopard	Panthera uncia		Vulnerable
Lakshadweep	Butterfly fish	Chaetodon decussatus		Least Concern
Puducherry	Indian palm squirrel	Funambulus palmarum		Least Concern
