= Neolissochilus minimus =

Scientific classification
- Kingdom: Animalia
- Phylum: Chordata
- Class: Actinopterygii
- Order: Cypriniformes
- Family: Cyprinidae
- Genus: Neolissochilus
- Species: N. minimus

Binomial name
- Neolissochilus minimus Arunachalam, Sivakumar & Murugan, 2017

Species of freshwater fish

Neolissochilus minimus is a species of cyprinid fish in the genus Neolissochilus. It inhabits the Western Ghats of India and has a maximum length of 12.9 centimetres (5.1 in).
