= Neolissochilus tamiraparaniensis =

Scientific classification
- Kingdom: Animalia
- Phylum: Chordata
- Class: Actinopterygii
- Order: Cypriniformes
- Family: Cyprinidae
- Genus: Neolissochilus
- Species: N. tamiraparaniensis

Binomial name
- Neolissochilus tamiraparaniensis Arunachalam, Sivakumar & Murugan, 2017

Species of fish

Neolissochilus tamiraparaniensis is a species of cyprinid fish. It is endemic to the Western Ghats of India and occurs in the Thamirabarani River system. It grows to 24.7 cm (9.7 in) standard length.
