= Neolissochilus paucisquamatus =

Conservation status
- Least Concern (IUCN 3.1)

Scientific classification
- Kingdom: Animalia
- Phylum: Chordata
- Class: Actinopterygii
- Order: Cypriniformes
- Family: Cyprinidae
- Genus: Neolissochilus
- Species: N. paucisquamatus

Binomial name
- Neolissochilus paucisquamatus (H. M. Smith, 1945)

Synonyms
- Puntius paucisquamatus H. M. Smith, 1945

Species of fish

Neolissochilus paucisquamatus is a species of cyprinid in the genus Neolissochilus. It inhabits Myanmar and Thailand and is not considered threatened or endangered.
