= Neolissochilus compressus =

Scientific classification
- Kingdom: Animalia
- Phylum: Chordata
- Class: Actinopterygii
- Order: Cypriniformes
- Family: Cyprinidae
- Genus: Neolissochilus
- Species: N. compressus

Binomial name
- Neolissochilus compressus (Day, 1870)

Synonyms
- Barbus compressus Day, 1870

Species of fish

Neolissochilus compressus is a species of freshwater ray-finned fish belonging to the family Cyprinidae, the family which includes the carps, barbs and related fishes. This species is endemic to Myanmar.
