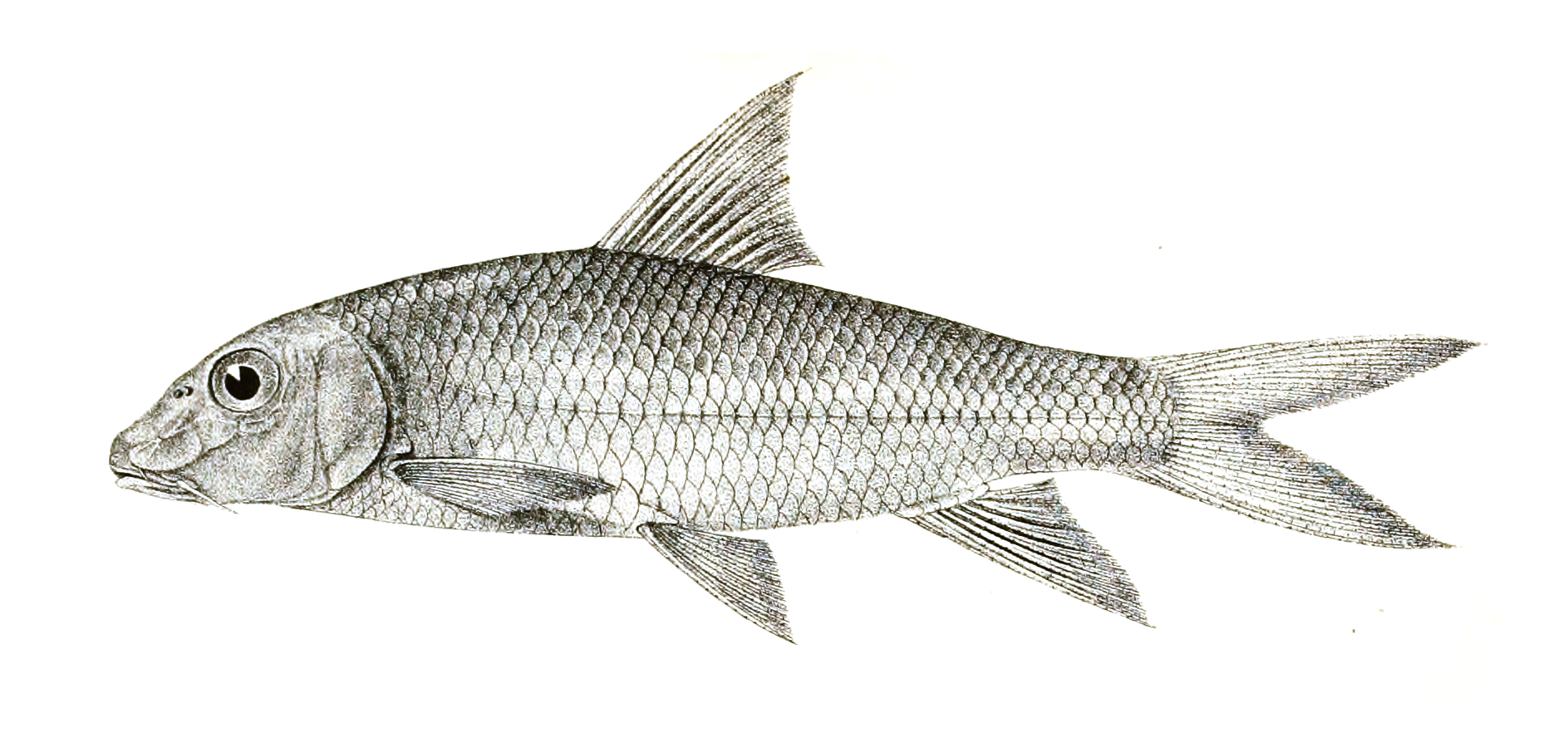

Conservation status
- Endangered (IUCN 3.1)

Scientific classification
- Kingdom: Animalia
- Phylum: Chordata
- Class: Actinopterygii
- Order: Cypriniformes
- Family: Cyprinidae
- Genus: Hypselobarbus
- Species: H. curmuca

Binomial name
- Hypselobarbus curmuca (Hamilton, 1807)

Synonyms
- Cyprinus curmuca Hamilton, 1807; Barbus curmuca (Hamilton, 1807); Gobio curmuca (Hamilton, 1807); Gonoproktopterus curmuca (Hamilton, 1807); Puntius curmuca (Hamilton, 1807); Gobio canarensis Jerdon, 1849; Barbus guentheri Day, 1869

= Curmuca barb =

Species of fish

The Curmuca barb (Hypselobarbus curmuca) is a species of ray-finned fish in the genus Hypselobarbus which is endemic to upland streams and rivers in southern India.
