= Hypselobarbus vaigaiensis =

Scientific classification
- Kingdom: Animalia
- Phylum: Chordata
- Class: Actinopterygii
- Order: Cypriniformes
- Family: Cyprinidae
- Genus: Hypselobarbus
- Species: H. vaigaiensis

Binomial name
- Hypselobarbus vaigaiensis Arunachalam, Chinnaraja, Chandran & Mayden, 2014

Species of fish

Hypselobarbus vaigaiensis is a species of cyprinid in the genus Hypselobarbus. It inhabits India.
