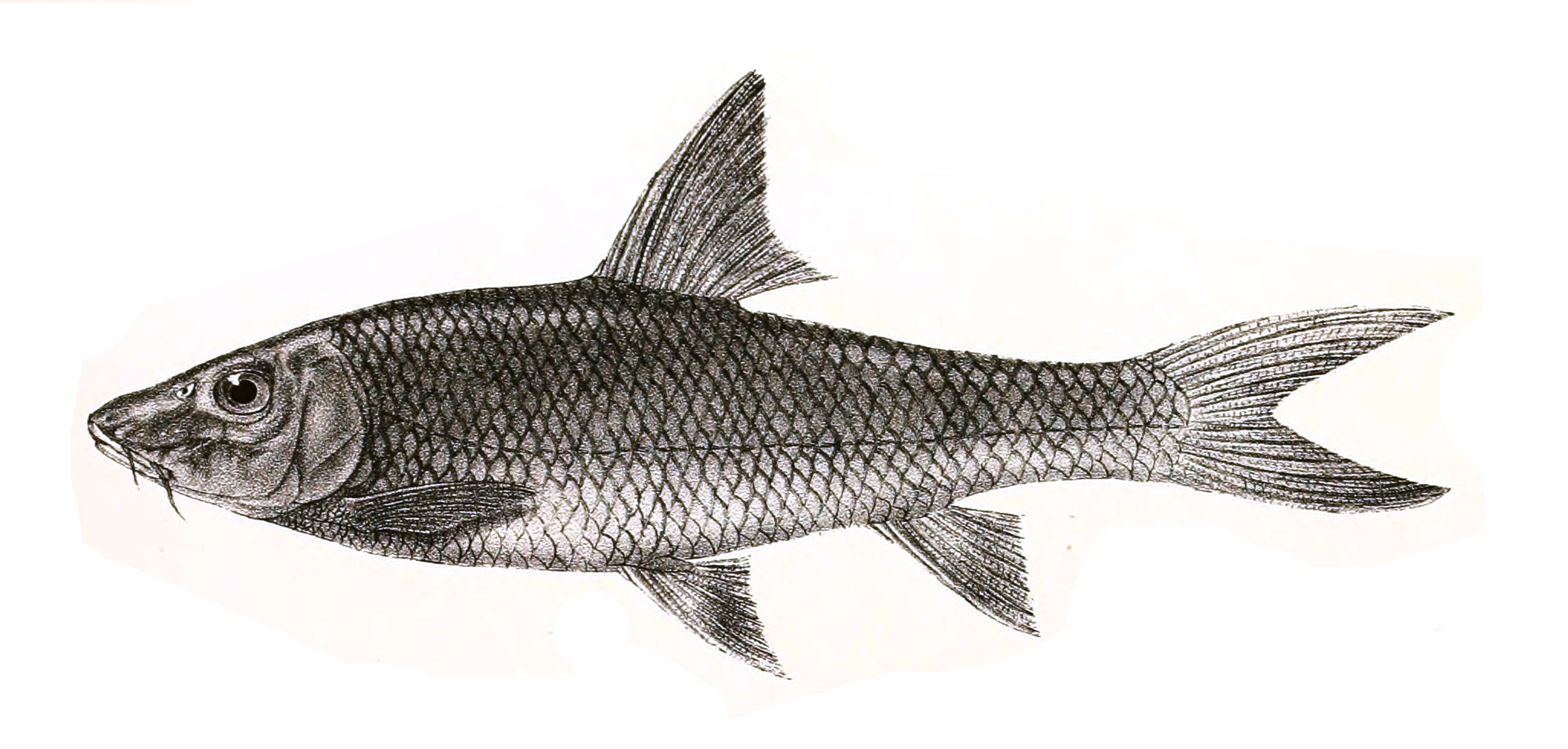

Conservation status
- Endangered (IUCN 3.1)

Scientific classification
- Kingdom: Animalia
- Phylum: Chordata
- Class: Actinopterygii
- Order: Cypriniformes
- Family: Cyprinidae
- Genus: Hypselobarbus
- Species: H. dubius

Binomial name
- Hypselobarbus dubius (F. Day, 1867)

Synonyms
- Puntius dubius Day, 1867; Barbus dubius (Day, 1867); Gonoproktopterus dubius (Day, 1867)

= Nilgiris barb =

Species of fish

The Nilgiris barb (Hypselobarbus dubius), also called the cock fish, is a tropical species of freshwater cyprinid fish. It is native to India. It is potamodromous, benthopelagic, and less than 25 cm long.

== Footnotes ==
- Froese, Rainer; Pauly, Daniel (eds.). "Hypselobarbus dubius". FishBase.
