= Lissochilus =

Scientific classification
- Kingdom: Animalia
- Phylum: Mollusca
- Class: Gastropoda
- Order: Cycloneritida
- Family: Neritidae
- Genus: †Lissochilus; Zittel, 1882

Synonyms
- Nerita (Lissochilus) Zittel, 1882; Stomatia (Megastoma) J. Morris & Lycett, 1851

Extinct genus of snail

Lissochilus is a genus of extinct marine snails in the family Neritidae, originally described as a subgenus of its type genus, Nerita, in 1882. (Note: Its original description reads: Innenlippe abgeplattet, eben, mit zehnlosem Innenrand. Aussenlippe scharf, innerlich nicht verdickt oder bezahnt. Hierher eine Anzahl triasischer und jurassischer Arten, wie N. sigaretina Buv., N. canaliculata Buv. (Coralrag), N. Pellati Lor., N. Bouchardiana Lor., N. transversa Seeb. (Portland-Stufe).) Despite first being named by one Pethö in a manuscript, that work was only published in 1906, making Zittel the first author who made this name available.

A genus of cyprinid fish was named in 1916 and also dubbed Lissochilus; due to taxonomic rules dictating the need for priority, this name is invalid, being a homonym of Lissochilus Zittel, 1882. The species assigned to it were subsequently moved to other genera, such as Acrossocheilus, Hypsibarbus, Poropuntius, and Neolissochilus.
