= Neolissochilus hendersoni =

Conservation status
- Vulnerable (IUCN 3.1)

Scientific classification
- Kingdom: Animalia
- Phylum: Chordata
- Class: Actinopterygii
- Order: Cypriniformes
- Family: Cyprinidae
- Genus: Neolissochilus
- Species: N. hendersoni

Binomial name
- Neolissochilus hendersoni (Herre, 1940)

Synonyms
- Lissochilus hendersoni Herre, 1940

Species of fish

Neolissochilus hendersoni is a species of cyprinid in the genus Neolissochilus. It lives in the Malay Peninsula and Thailand.

Due to very confusing morphological similarities with the related species Neolissochilus soroides, further work is needed to correctly identify between these species. There may even be a case for describing some of these morphs as distinct, new species.
