= Neolissochilus stevensonii =

Conservation status
- Data Deficient (IUCN 3.1)

Scientific classification
- Kingdom: Animalia
- Phylum: Chordata
- Class: Actinopterygii
- Order: Cypriniformes
- Family: Cyprinidae
- Genus: Neolissochilus
- Species: N. stevensonii

Binomial name
- Neolissochilus stevensonii (Day, 1870)

Synonyms
- Barbus stevensonii Day, 1870

Species of fish

Neolissochilus stevensonii, commonly known as Stevenson's mahseer is a species within the Cyprinidae family in the genus Neolissochilus. Its only known habitats are in Myanmar.
