= Neolissochilus micropthalmus =

Scientific classification
- Kingdom: Animalia
- Phylum: Chordata
- Class: Actinopterygii
- Order: Cypriniformes
- Family: Cyprinidae
- Genus: Neolissochilus
- Species: N. micropthalmus

Binomial name
- Neolissochilus micropthalmus Arunachalam, Sivakumar & Murugan, 2017

Species of fish

Neolissochilus micropthalmus is a species of cyprinid in the genus Neolissochilus. It inhabits India and has a maximum length of 17.3 centimetres (6.8 in).
