= Neolissochilus dukai =

Conservation status
- Data Deficient (IUCN 3.1)

Scientific classification
- Kingdom: Animalia
- Phylum: Chordata
- Class: Actinopterygii
- Division: Teleostei
- Order: Cypriniformes
- Family: Cyprinidae
- Genus: Neolissochilus
- Species: N. dukai

Binomial name
- Neolissochilus dukai (Day, 1878)

Synonyms
- Barbus dukai Day, 1878; Acrossocheilus dukai (Day, 1878); Puntius dukai (Day, 1878)

Species of fish

Neolissochilus dukai is a species of freshwater ray-finned fish belonging to the family Cyprinidae, the family which includes the carps, barbs and related fishes. This species has been recorded from the Ramganga in Uttar Pradesh and the Teesta River near Darjeeling.
