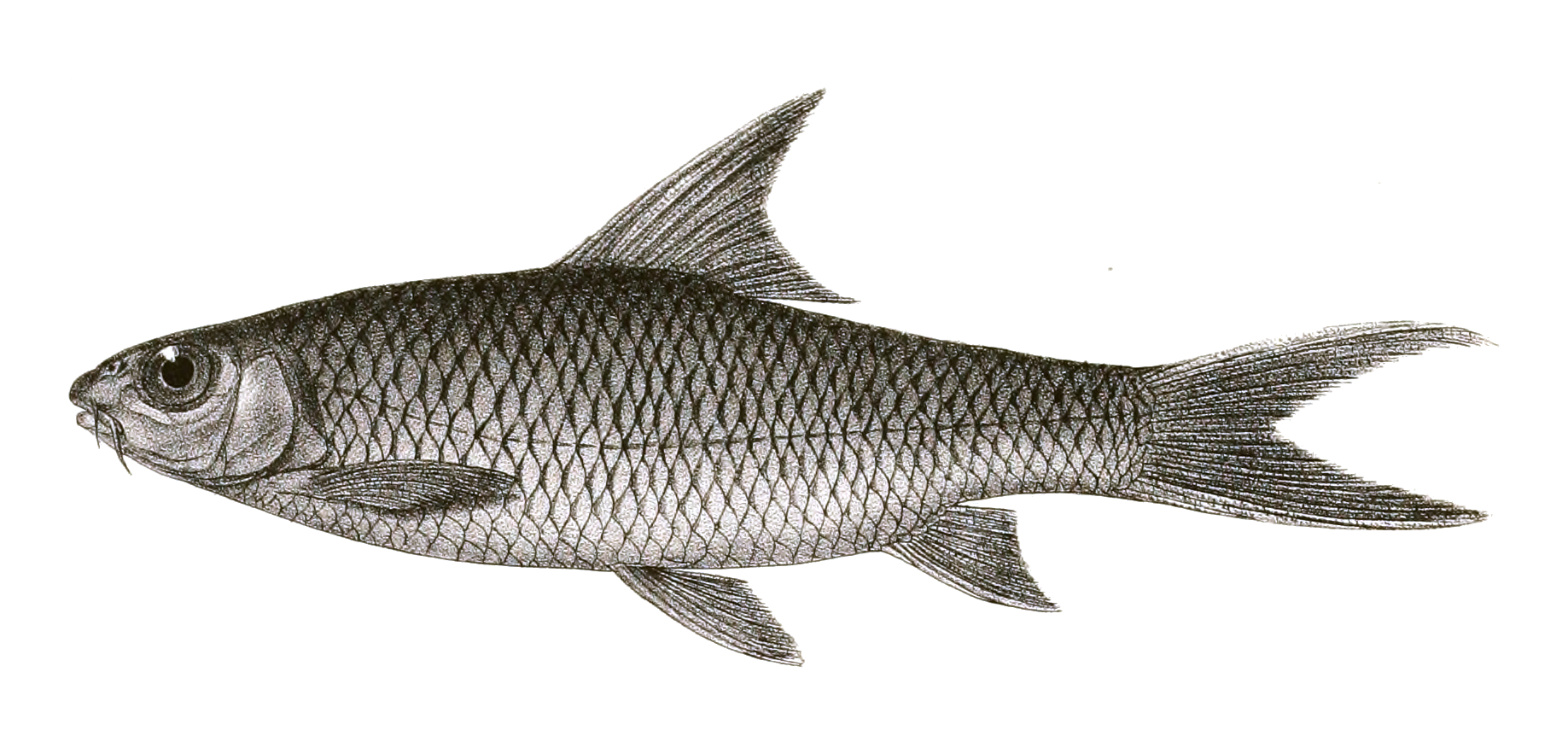

Conservation status
- Data Deficient (IUCN 3.1)

Scientific classification
- Kingdom: Animalia
- Phylum: Chordata
- Class: Actinopterygii
- Order: Cypriniformes
- Family: Cyprinidae
- Genus: Hypselobarbus
- Species: H. lithopidos

Binomial name
- Hypselobarbus lithopidos (F. Day, 1874)

Synonyms
- Barbus lithopidos Day, 1874; Gonoproktopterus lithopidos (Day, 1874); Puntius lithopidos (Day, 1874)

= Hypselobarbus lithopidos =

Canara barb

Species of fish

Hypselobarbus lithopidos (Canara barb) is a species of ray-finned fish in the genus Hypselobarbus. It is possibly extinct as it has not been recorded since the 1940s and its true taxonomic status needs to be ascertained.

== Footnotes ==
- Froese, Rainer; Pauly, Daniel (eds.). "Hypselobarbus lithopidos". FishBase.
