= Neolissochilus acutirostris =

Scientific classification
- Kingdom: Animalia
- Phylum: Chordata
- Class: Actinopterygii
- Order: Cypriniformes
- Family: Cyprinidae
- Genus: Neolissochilus
- Species: N. acutirostris

Binomial name
- Neolissochilus acutirostris Arunachalam, Sivakumar & Murugan, 2017

Species of fish

Neolissochilus acutirostris is a species of cyprinid in the genus Neolissochilus. This species has a maximum published standard length of 22.6 centimetres (8.9 in). This species is endemic to India where it occurs in the Cauvery River drainage in Karnataka.
