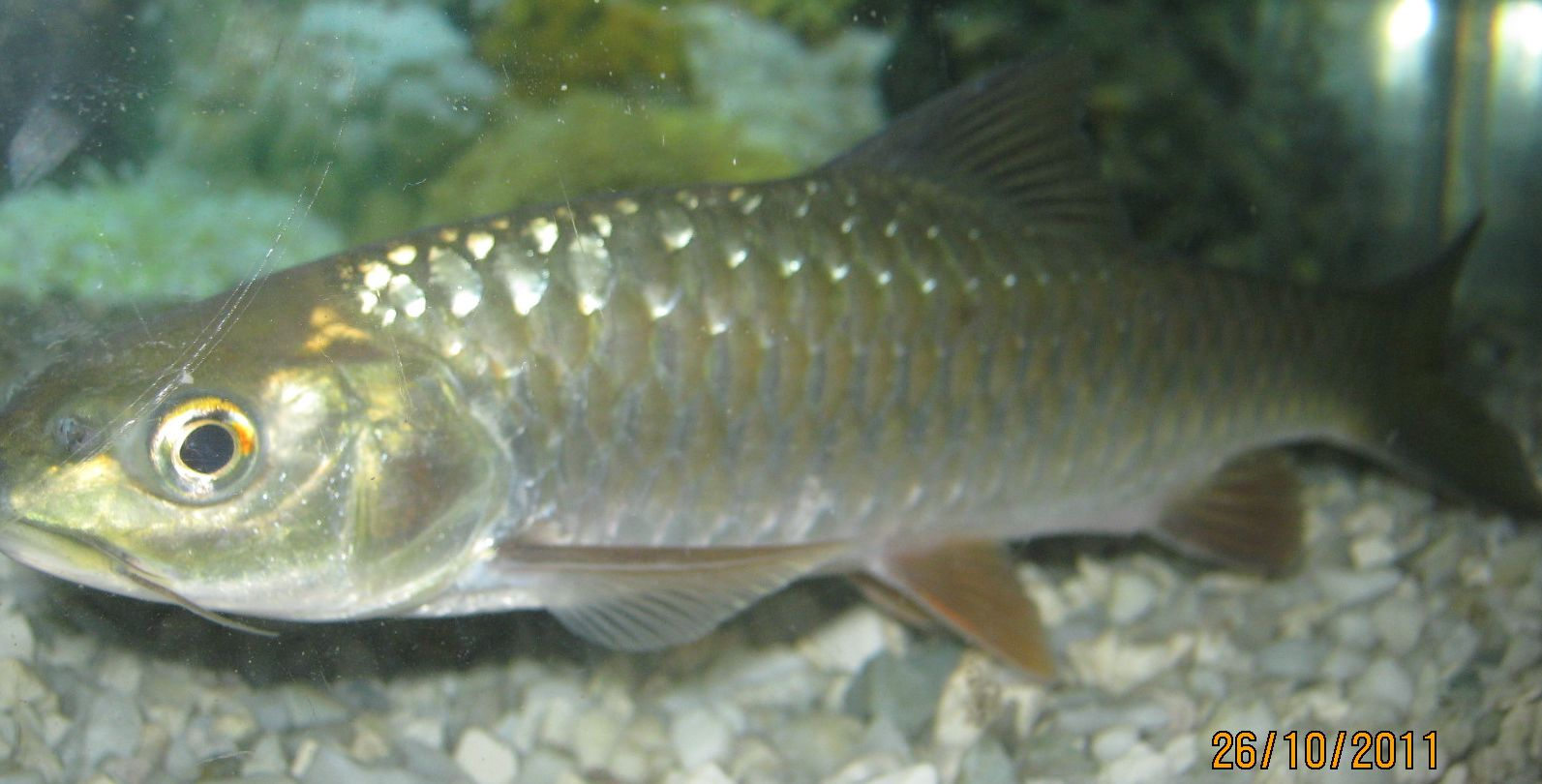

Conservation status
- Vulnerable (IUCN 3.1)

Scientific classification
- Kingdom: Animalia
- Phylum: Chordata
- Class: Actinopterygii
- Order: Cypriniformes
- Family: Cyprinidae
- Genus: Neolissochilus
- Species: N. thienemanni

Binomial name
- Neolissochilus thienemanni (C. G. E. Ahl, 1933)

Synonyms
- Lissochilus thienemanni Ahl, 1933; Neolissochilus theinemanni (Ahl, 1933)

= Neolissochilus thienemanni =

Species of fish

Neolissochilus thienemanni, the ihan, is a species of ray-finned fish in the family Cyprinidae. It is found only in Lake Toba on the island of Sumatra, Indonesia.
