= Hypselobarbus keralaensis =

Scientific classification
- Kingdom: Animalia
- Phylum: Chordata
- Class: Actinopterygii
- Order: Cypriniformes
- Family: Cyprinidae
- Genus: Hypselobarbus
- Species: H. keralaensis

Binomial name
- Hypselobarbus keralaensis Arunachalam, Chinnaraja & Mayden, 2016

Species of fish

Hypselobarbus keralaensis is a species of cyprinid in the genus Hypselobarbus. It inhabits Kerala, India and its maximum length is 19.2 centimetres (7.6 in).
