= Neolissochilus spinulosus =

Conservation status
- Data Deficient (IUCN 3.1)

Scientific classification
- Kingdom: Animalia
- Phylum: Chordata
- Class: Actinopterygii
- Order: Cypriniformes
- Family: Cyprinidae
- Genus: Neolissochilus
- Species: N. spinulosus

Binomial name
- Neolissochilus spinulosus (McClelland, 1845)

Species of fish

Neolissochilus spinulosus, commonly known as the spinulosus mahseer, is a species of cyprinid in the genus Neolissochilus. It is endemic to the Indian state of Sikkim. It is considered harmless to humans.
