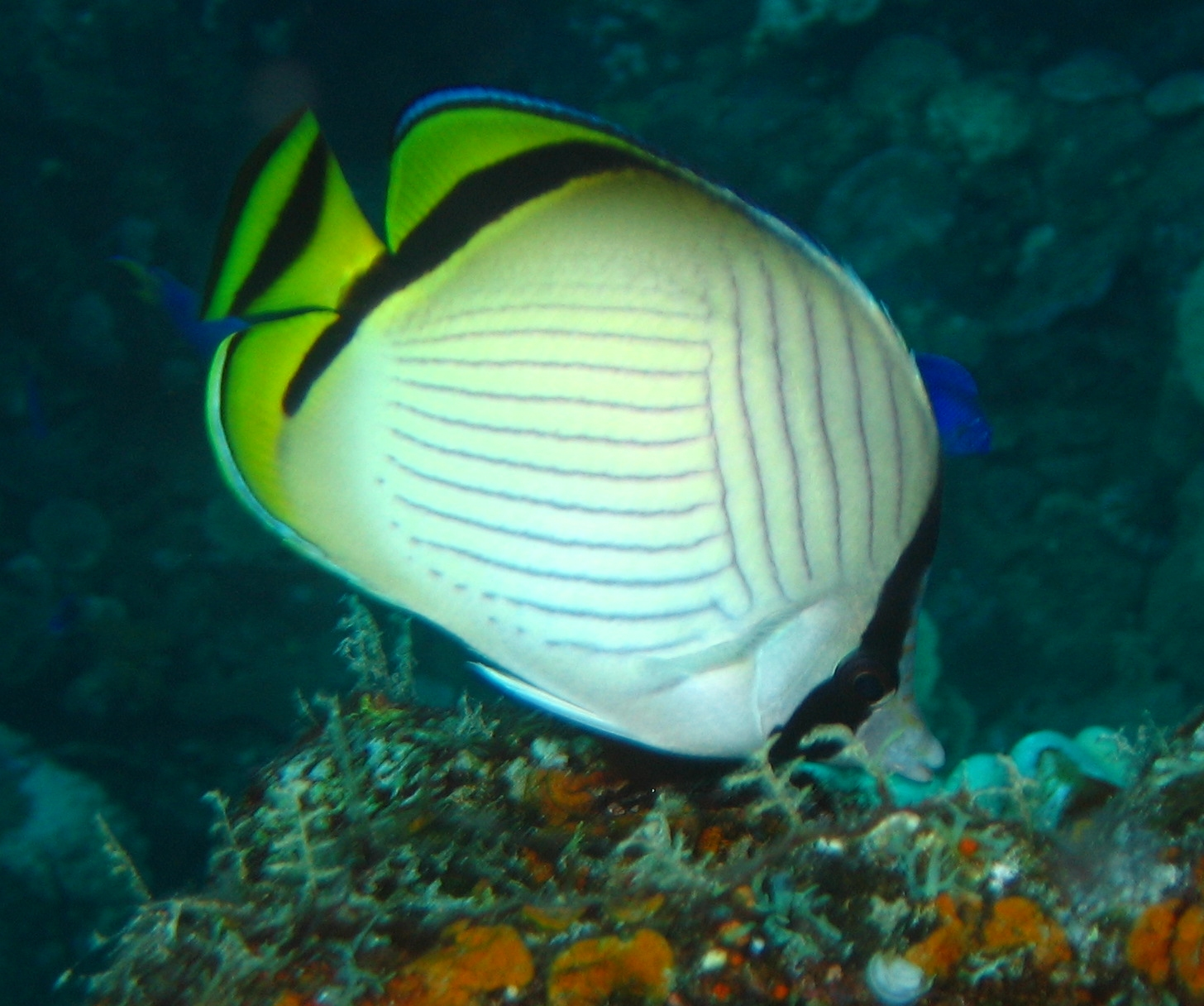

Conservation status
- Least Concern (IUCN 3.1)

Scientific classification
- Kingdom: Animalia
- Phylum: Chordata
- Class: Actinopterygii
- Division: Teleostei
- Order: Acanthuriformes
- Family: Chaetodontidae
- Genus: Chaetodon
- Subgenus: Chaetodon (Rabdophorus)
- Species: C. vagabundus

Binomial name
- Chaetodon vagabundus Linnaeus, 1758

Synonyms
- Anisochaetodon vagabundus (Linnaeus, 1758); Tetragonoptrus vagabundus (Linnaeus, 1758); Chaetodon nesogallicus Cuvier, 1829; Tetragonoptrus nesogallicus (Cuvier, 1829); Chaetodon setifer hawaiiensis Borodin, 1930

= Vagabond butterflyfish =

Species of fish

The vagabond butterflyfish (Chaetodon vagabundus), also known as the crisscross butterflyfish, is a species of marine ray-finned fish, a butterflyfish belonging to the family Chaetodontidae. It is found in the Indo-Pacific region.

== Description ==
The vagabond butterflyfish has a whitish body which is marked with two series of thin dark diagonal lines perpendicular to each other, forming a chevron pattern. There is also a wide black vertical band running through the eye and a second band running through the caudal peduncle and a third on the centre of the caudal fin. There are very thin orange horizontal lines over the forehead. The juveniles have a black dot on the soft-rayed part of their dorsal fin, near the posterior end. The dorsal fin contains 13 spines and 23–25 soft rays while the anal fin contains 3 spines and 19–22 soft rays. This species grows to a maximum total length of 23 centimetres (9.1 in) although a more typical length would be 15 centimetres (5.9 in).

== Distribution ==
The vagabond butterflyfish is found in the Indian and Pacific Oceans. It occurs from the eastern coast of Africa, where it is found from Socotra to KwaZulu-Natal in South Africa; across the Indian Ocean east as far as the Line and Gambier Islands in Polynesia, north to southern Japan and south to New South Wales and Rapa Iti.

== Habitat and biology ==
The vagabond butterflyfish is found in reef areas including coastal reef flats within the reef, lagoons and more exposed outer reef slopes. It can tolerate a variety of environmental conditions, such as turbid waters and freshwater plumes in the vicinity of the mouths of streams. They are omnivorous, known to feed on algae, coral polyps, crustaceans and worms. These oviparous, monogamous fish form stable pairs with both pair members jointly defending a feeding territory against other pairs. However they often accompany other species without being aggressive. By the standards of their genus, they are easily maintained in tanks.

== Systematics ==
The vagabond butterflyfish was first formally described in 1758 by Carl Linnaeus in the 10th edition of his Systema Naturae. It belongs to the large subgenus Rabdophorus which might warrant recognition as a distinct genus. In this group, it almost certainly is a rather close relative of the threadfin butterflyfish (C. auriga) and the Indian vagabond butterflyfish (C. decussatus). The latter might be closer to the threadfin butterflyfish; as C. vagabundus has yielded abnormal mtDNA 12S rRNA sequence data this is hard to say however. The C. auriga species group shares the characteristic pattern of two areas of ascending and descending oblique lines; species differ conspicuously in hindpart coloration.
