= Hypselobarbus periyarensis =

Conservation status
- Endangered (IUCN 3.1)

Scientific classification
- Kingdom: Animalia
- Phylum: Chordata
- Class: Actinopterygii
- Order: Cypriniformes
- Family: Cyprinidae
- Genus: Hypselobarbus
- Species: H. periyarensis

Binomial name
- Hypselobarbus periyarensis (B. S. Raj, 1941)

Synonyms
- Barbus micropogon periyarensis B. S. Raj, 1941; Gonoproktopterus periyarensis (B. S. Raj, 1941); Puntius micropogon periyarensis (B. S. Raj, 1941)

Species of fish

Hypselobarbus periyarensis is a species of cyprinid fish endemic to Periyar Lake in Kerala, India. This species can reach 50 cm (20 in) in total length.
