= Hypselobarbus kurali =

Conservation status
- Least Concern (IUCN 3.1)

Scientific classification
- Kingdom: Animalia
- Phylum: Chordata
- Class: Actinopterygii
- Order: Cypriniformes
- Family: Cyprinidae
- Genus: Hypselobarbus
- Species: H. kurali

Binomial name
- Hypselobarbus kurali (Menon & Rema Devi, 1995)

Synonyms
- Hypselobarbus kurali Menon & Rema Devi, 1995

Species of fish

Hypselobarbus kurali is a species of ray-finned fish in the genus Hypselobarbus which is endemic to the southern Western Ghats.

== Footnotes ==
- Froese, Rainer; Pauly, Daniel (eds.). "Hypselobarbus kurali". FishBase.
