= Neolissochilus blythii =

Conservation status
- Data Deficient (IUCN 3.1)

Scientific classification
- Kingdom: Animalia
- Phylum: Chordata
- Class: Actinopterygii
- Order: Cypriniformes
- Family: Cyprinidae
- Genus: Neolissochilus
- Species: N. blythii

Binomial name
- Neolissochilus blythii (Day, 1870)

Synonyms
- Barbus blythii Day, 1870

Species of fish

Neolissochilus blythii is a species of freshwater ray-finned fish belonging to the family Cyprinidae, the family which includes the carps, barbs and related fishes. This species is found in the Tenasserim Hills in southern Myanamar.
