= Neolissochilus heterostomus =

Scientific classification
- Kingdom: Animalia
- Phylum: Chordata
- Class: Actinopterygii
- Order: Cypriniformes
- Family: Cyprinidae
- Genus: Neolissochilus
- Species: N. heterostomus

Binomial name
- Neolissochilus heterostomus (X. Y. Chen & J. X. Yang, 1999)

Synonyms
- Barbodes heterostomus X. Y. Chen & J. X. Yang, 1999

Species of fish

Neolissochilus heterostomus is a species of freshwater ray-finned fish belonging to the family Cyprinidae, the family which includes the carps, barbs and related fishes. This species is found in the Longchuanjiang and Dayingjiang rivers in the upper Irrawaddy in Yunnan. This species has a maximum published standard length of 23.2 cm (9.1 in).
