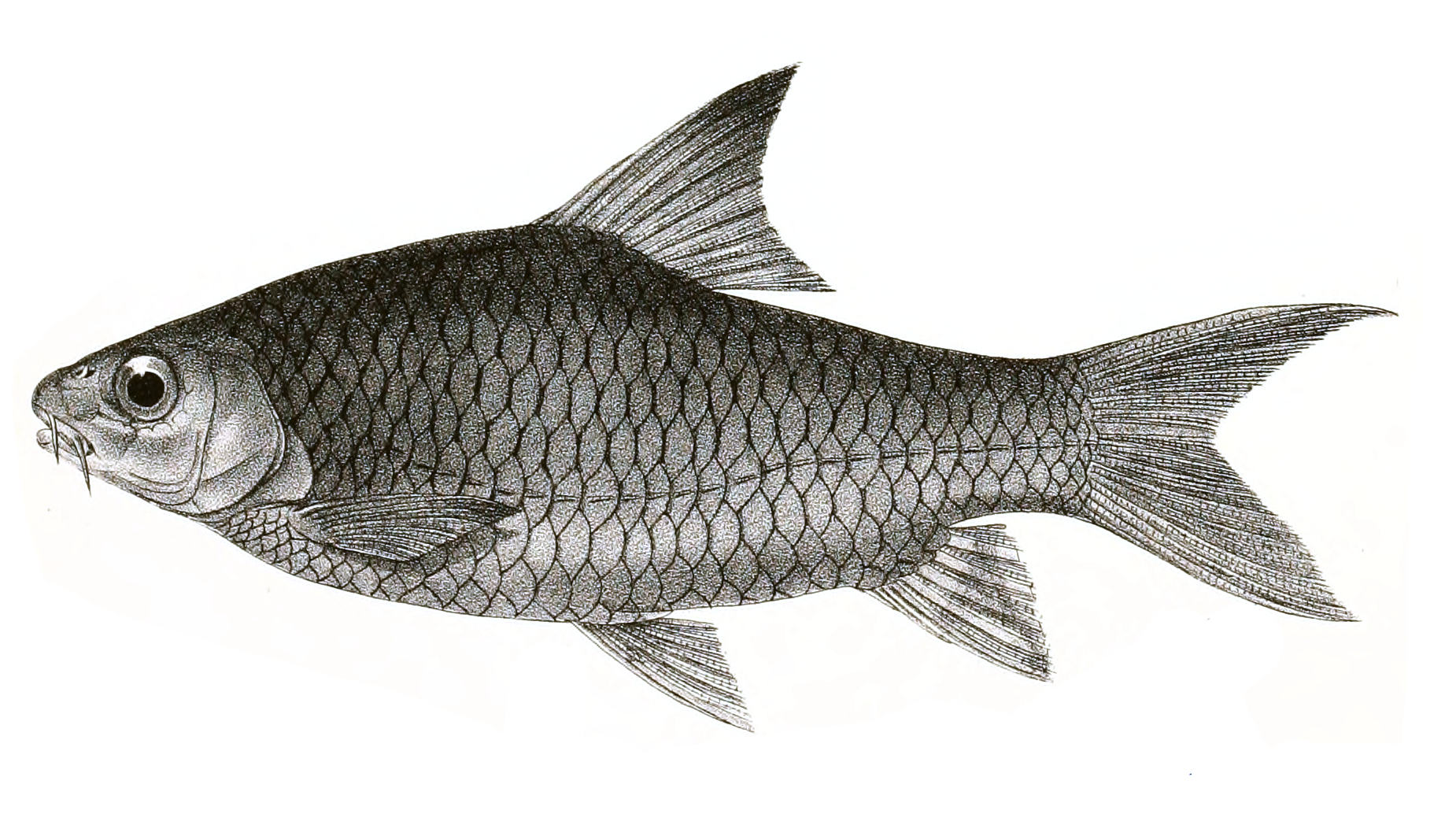

Conservation status
- Least Concern (IUCN 3.1)

Scientific classification
- Kingdom: Animalia
- Phylum: Chordata
- Class: Actinopterygii
- Order: Cypriniformes
- Family: Cyprinidae
- Genus: Hypselobarbus
- Species: H. jerdoni

Binomial name
- Hypselobarbus jerdoni (F. Day, 1870)

Synonyms
- Barbus jerdoni F. Day, 1870; Puntius jerdoni (F. Day, 1870)

= Hypselobarbus jerdoni =

Species of fish

Hypselobarbus jerdoni, also known as Jerdon's carp, is a species of cyprinid fish endemic to India where it is found in larger streams of southern Karnataka, Tamil Nadu, Kerala and Maharashtra. This species can grow to a length of 46 centimetres (18 in) TL. It is caught commercially for human consumption.

== Etymology ==
The fish is named in honor of British physician-naturalist Thomas Caverhill Jerdon (1811–1872), who described a lot of fishes from India, including Hypselobarbus gracilis.
