= Hypselobarbus kushavali =

Scientific classification
- Kingdom: Animalia
- Phylum: Chordata
- Class: Actinopterygii
- Order: Cypriniformes
- Family: Cyprinidae
- Genus: Hypselobarbus
- Species: H. kushavali

Binomial name
- Hypselobarbus kushavali Arunachalam, Chinnaraja, Sivakumar & Mayden, 2016

Species of fish

Hypselobarbus kushavali is a genus of cyprinid in the genus Hypselobarbus. It inhabits the Kali River, Karnataka, India. Its maximum length is 31.0 centimetres (12.2 in).
