= Neolissochilus nigrovittatus =

Conservation status
- Data Deficient (IUCN 3.1)

Scientific classification
- Kingdom: Animalia
- Phylum: Chordata
- Class: Actinopterygii
- Order: Cypriniformes
- Family: Cyprinidae
- Genus: Neolissochilus
- Species: N. nigrovittatus

Binomial name
- Neolissochilus nigrovittatus (Boulenger, 1893)

Synonyms
- Barbus nigrovittatus Boulenger, 1893; Tor nigrovittatus (Boulenger, 1893)

Species of fish

Neolissochilus nigrovittatus is a species of cyprinid in the genus Neolissochilus. It inhabits Myanmar and Thailand and has a maximum length of 13.0 centimetres (5.1 in).
