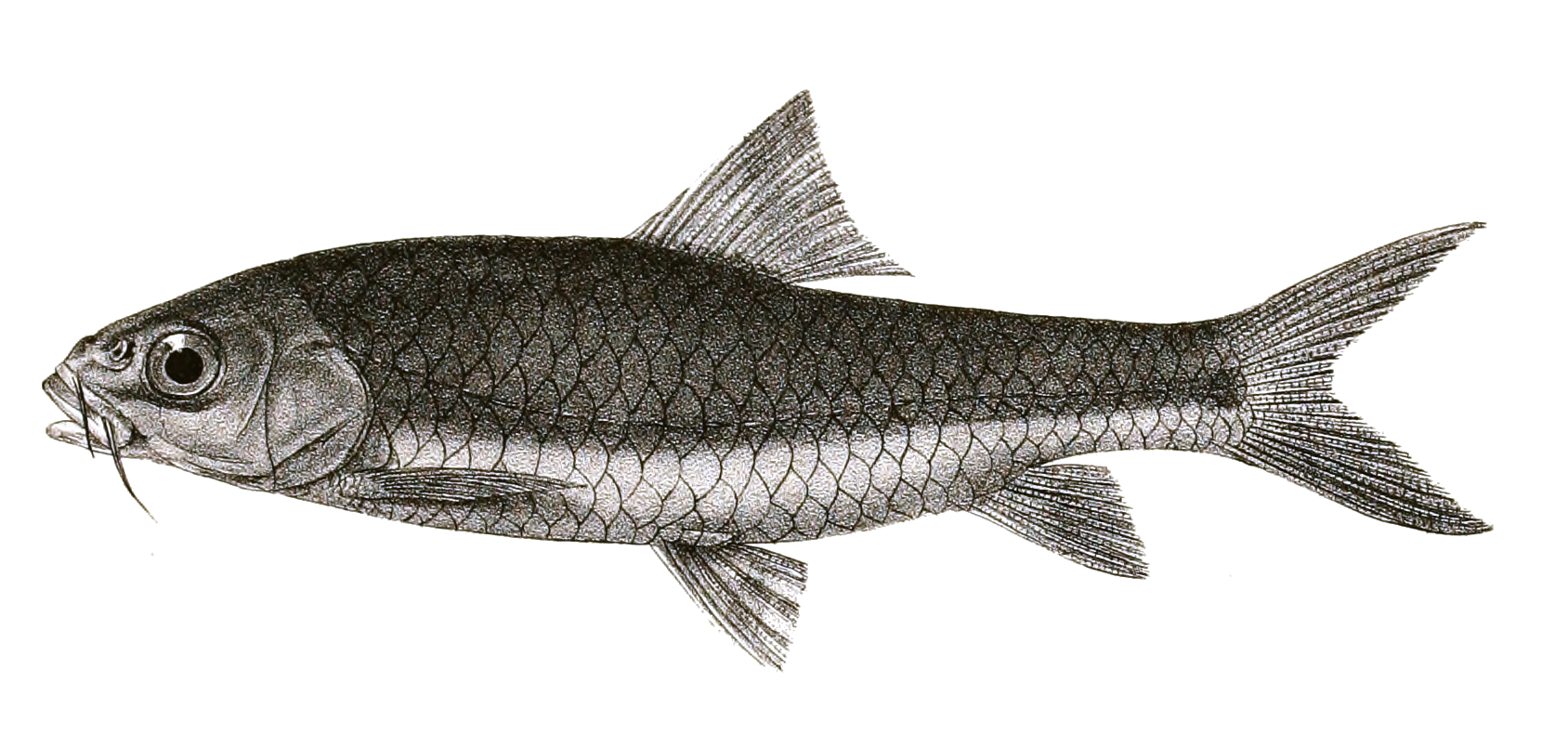

Conservation status
- Critically Endangered (IUCN 3.1)

Scientific classification
- Kingdom: Animalia
- Phylum: Chordata
- Class: Actinopterygii
- Order: Cypriniformes
- Family: Cyprinidae
- Genus: Neolissochilus
- Species: N. wynaadensis

Binomial name
- Neolissochilus wynaadensis (F. Day, 1873)

Synonyms
- Barbus wynaadensis F. Day, 1873; Puntius wynaadensis (F. Day, 1873); Barbodes wynaadensis (F. Day, 1873)

= Neolissochilus wynaadensis =

Species of fish

Neolissochilus wynaadensis, the Wayanad mahseer, is a species of cyprinid fish. It is endemic to the Wyanad Plateau and its surroundings in the southern Western Ghats, India. It occurs in fast-flowing rivers and streams with rock substrates. This species can reach a length of 50 centimetres (20 in) TL. It is of minor importance to local commercial fisheries.

Species revision in 2014 based on phylogenetic study has moved the genus of this fish from Barbodes to Neolissochilus.
