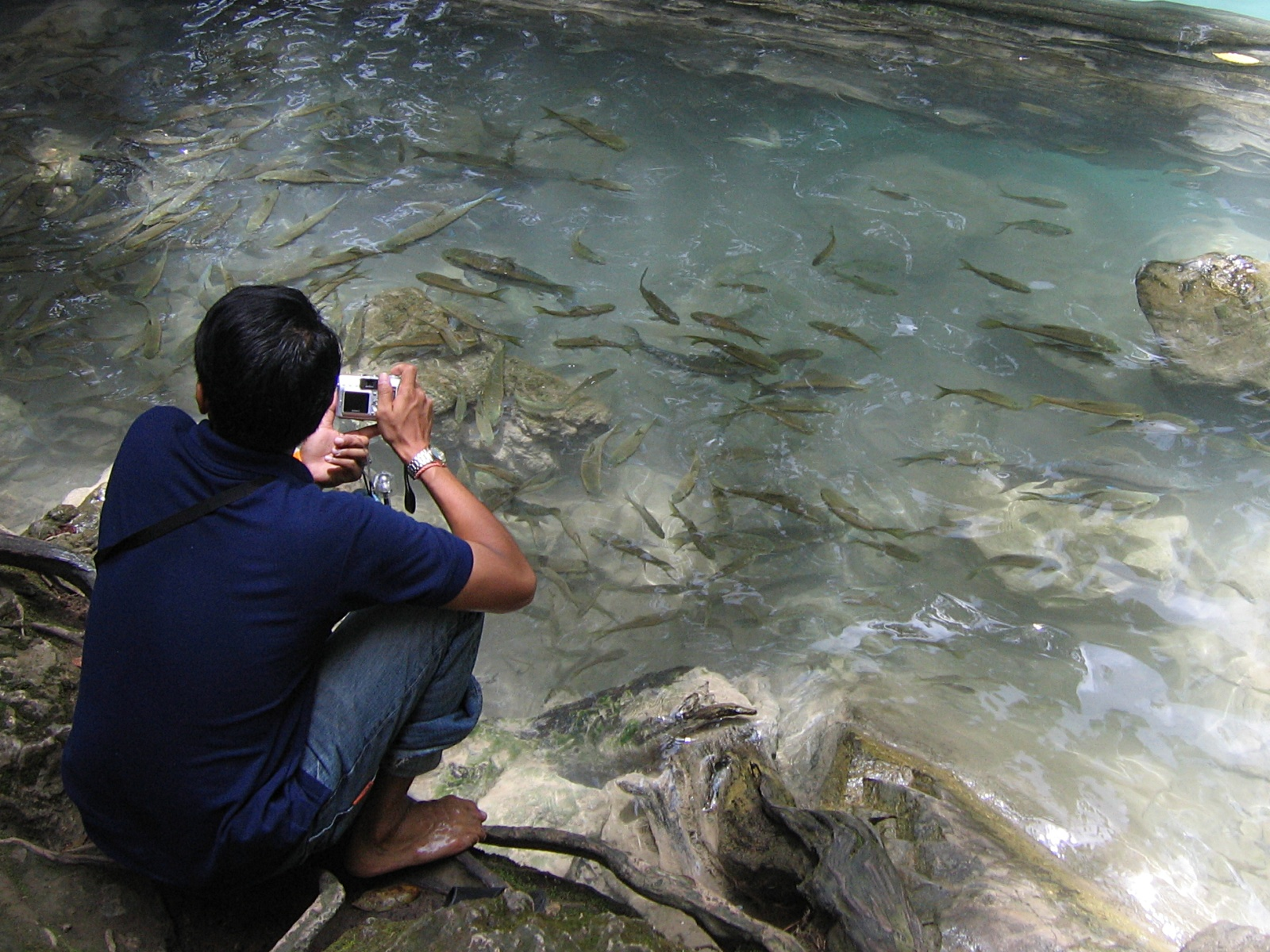
- A large shoal of Neolissocheilus Fishes

Conservation status
- Near Threatened (IUCN 3.1)

Scientific classification
- Kingdom: Animalia
- Phylum: Chordata
- Class: Actinopterygii
- Order: Cypriniformes
- Family: Cyprinidae
- Genus: Neolissochilus
- Species: N. blanci

Binomial name
- Neolissochilus blanci (Pellegrin & P. W. Fang, 1940)

Synonyms
- Barbus blanci Pellegrin & Fang, 1940; Tor blanci (Pellegrin & Fang, 1940)

= Neolissochilus blanci =

Species of fish

Neolissochilus blanci is a species of freshwater ray-finned fish belonging to the family Cyprinidae, the family which includes the carps, barbs and related fishes. This species is found in the Mekong, Chao Phraya and Mae Klong rivers in Thialnd, Laos, Cambodia and Viet Nam. It may also be found in Myanmar and southern China.
