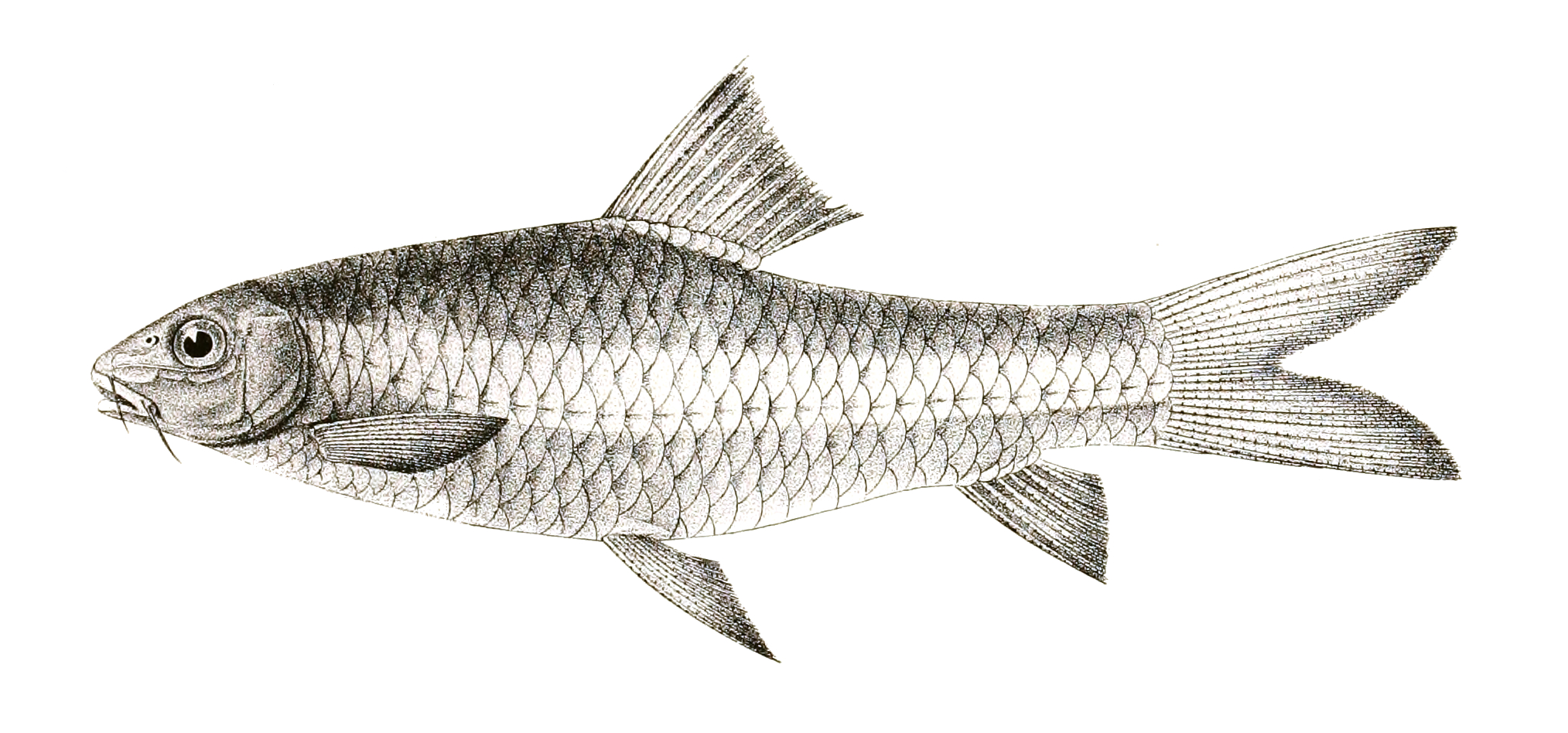

Conservation status
- Critically endangered, possibly extinct (IUCN 3.1)

Scientific classification
- Kingdom: Animalia
- Phylum: Chordata
- Class: Actinopterygii
- Order: Cypriniformes
- Family: Cyprinidae
- Genus: Hypselobarbus
- Species: H. pulchellus

Binomial name
- Hypselobarbus pulchellus (F. Day, 1870)

Synonyms
- Barbus pulchellus Day, 1870; Puntius pulchellus (Day, 1870)

= Hypselobarbus pulchellus =

Species of fish

Hypselobarbus pulchellus is a critically endangered species of ray-finned fish in the genus Hypselobarbus. It is currently only recorded in the Dakshina Kannada district of Karnataka, India. It is also the only indigenous fish that consumes on aquatic reeds, and submerged underwater grasses, in India it could contain a crucial roll in reserviors, tanks, and irragation canals. The fish is native to the peninusular rivers of India.

== Footnotes ==
- Froese, Rainer; Pauly, Daniel (eds.). "Hypselobarbus pulchellus". FishBase.
