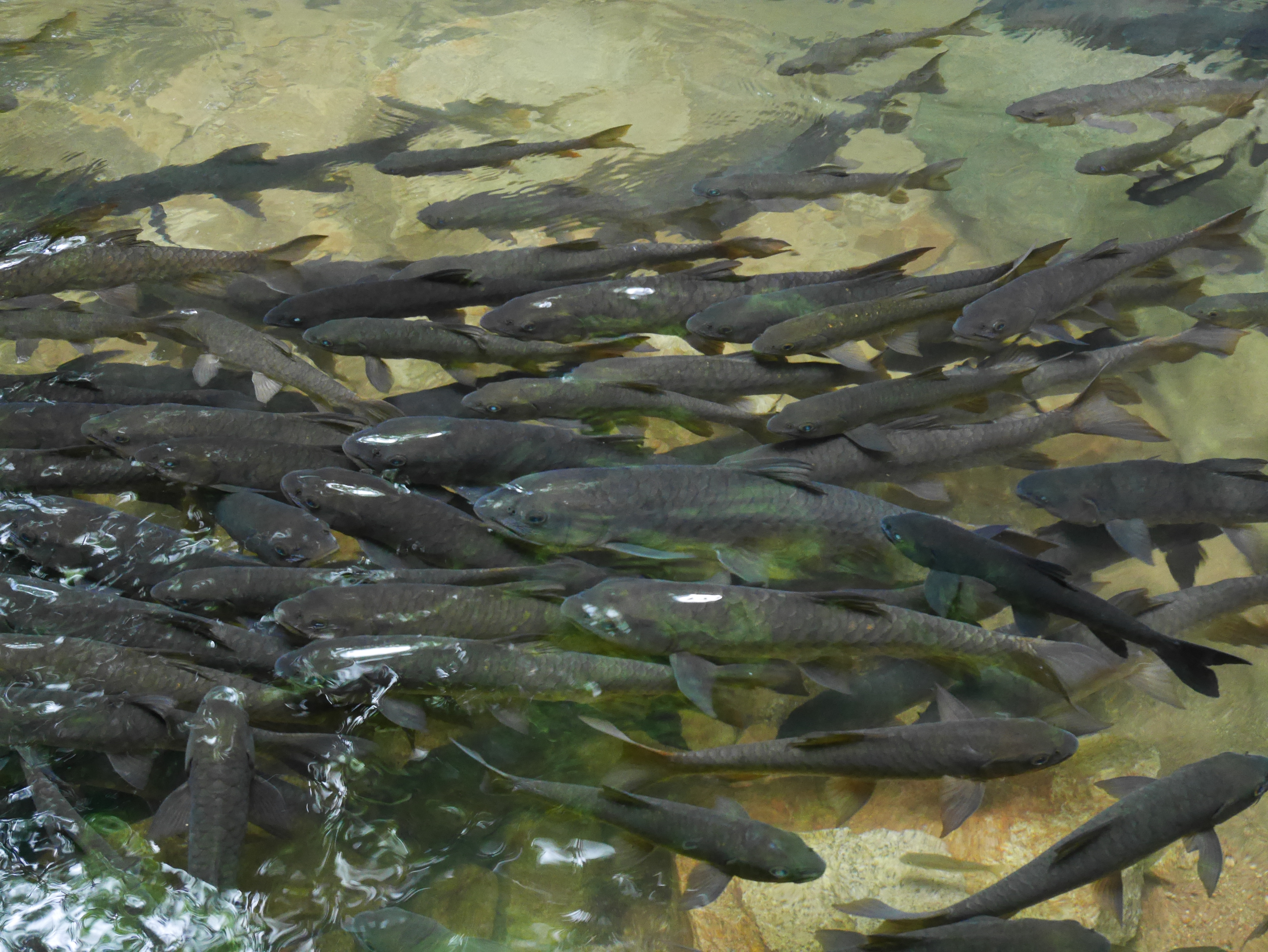
- A school of soro brook carps at Phlio Waterfall, Thailand

Conservation status
- Least Concern (IUCN 3.1)

Scientific classification
- Kingdom: Animalia
- Phylum: Chordata
- Class: Actinopterygii
- Order: Cypriniformes
- Family: Cyprinidae
- Genus: Neolissochilus
- Species: N. soroides

Binomial name
- Neolissochilus soroides (Duncker, 1904)

Synonyms
- Barbus soroides Duncker, 1904

= Neolissochilus soroides =

Species of fish

Neolissochilus soroides, commonly called the soro brook carp is a species of freshwater ray-finned fish belonging to the family Cyprinidae, the family which includes the carps, barbs and related fishes. This species is found in Thailand, Malaysia and Sumatra.

Due to very confusing morphological similarities with the related species Neolissochilus hendersoni, further work is needed to correctly identify between these species. There may even be a case for describing some of these morphs as distinct, new species.
