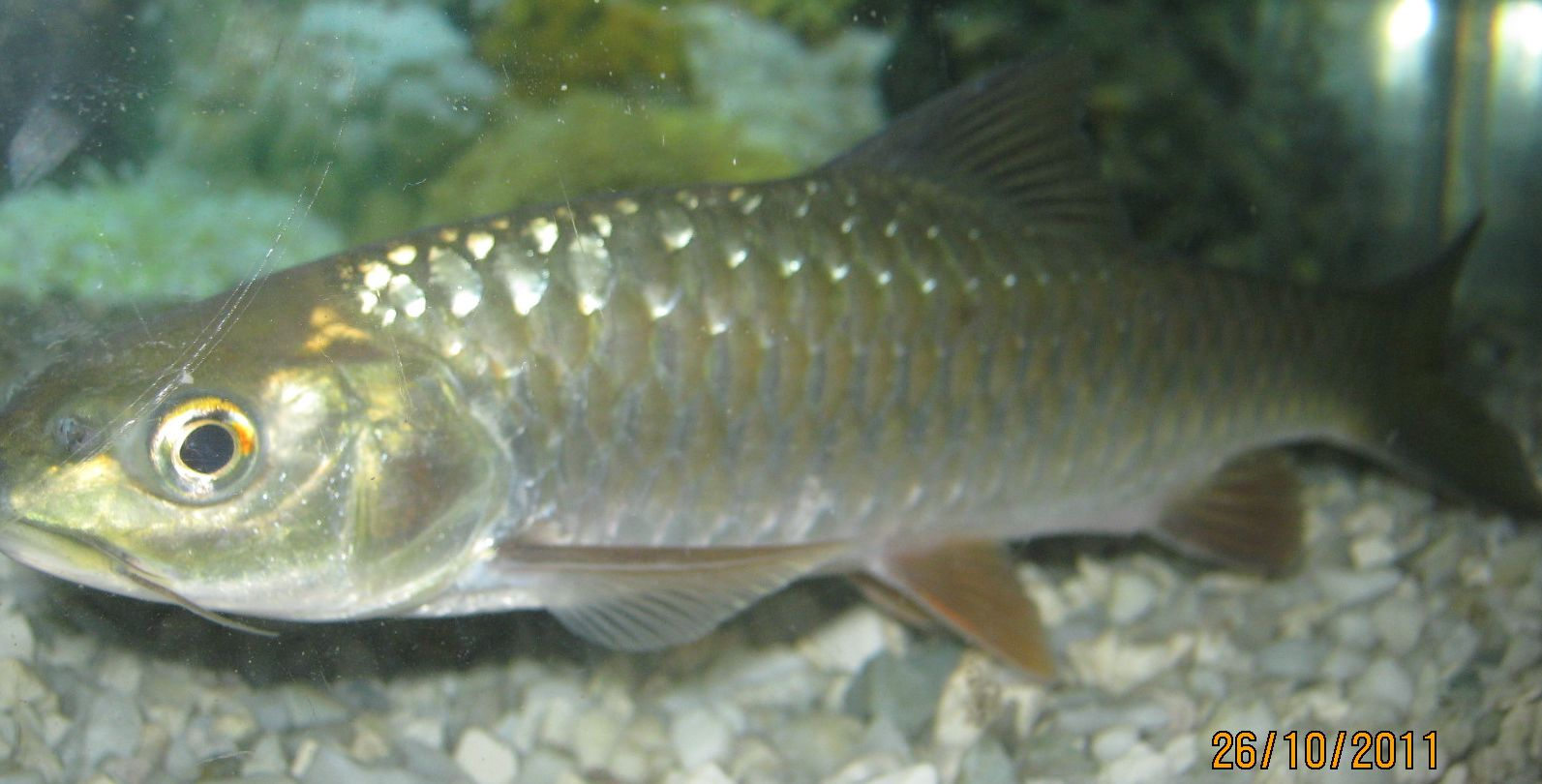

Conservation status
- Near Threatened (IUCN 3.1)

Scientific classification
- Kingdom: Animalia
- Phylum: Chordata
- Class: Actinopterygii
- Division: Teleostei
- Order: Cypriniformes
- Family: Cyprinidae
- Genus: Neolissochilus
- Species: N. hexagonolepis

Binomial name
- Neolissochilus hexagonolepis (McClelland, 1839)

Synonyms
- Barbus hexagonolepis McClelland, 1839; Acrossocheilus hexagonolepis (McClelland, 1839); Barbodes hexagonolepis (McClelland, 1839)

= Neolissochilus hexagonolepis =

Species of fish

Neolissochilus hexagonolepis, the copper mahseer, chocolate mahseer or katli, is a species of freshwater ray-finned fish belonging to the family Cyprinidae, the family which includes the carps, barbs and related fishes. This species is found in Nepal, eastern India, Bangladesh, Myanmar, Thailand, Malaysia and Sumatra. It may also be present in China and Viet Nam, also the records of this species from the eastern part of its range is uncertain and reports may be misidentifications.

In 2021, the Indian state of Sikkim declared the copper mahseer, locally called 'Katley' as the State fish.

== Distribution ==
The fish is found in different altitudes of the state of Sikkim, mainly in the Teesta and Rangit rivers and their tributaries.

== Endangered Status ==
In 1992, ICAR-National Bureau of Fish Genetic Resources, Lucknow categorized the fish as an endangered species. In 2014, IUCN, categorized it as an endangered species.
