= Hypselobarbus gracilis =

Scientific classification
- Domain: Eukaryota
- Kingdom: Animalia
- Phylum: Chordata
- Class: Actinopterygii
- Order: Cypriniformes
- Family: Cyprinidae
- Genus: Hypselobarbus
- Species: H. gracilis

Binomial name
- Hypselobarbus gracilis (Jerdon, 1849)

Species of fish

Hypselobarbus gracilis is a species of cyprinid in the genus Hypselobarbus. It inhabits India and has a maximum length of 13.9 centimetres (5.5 in).
