= Tor hemispinus =

Scientific classification
- Kingdom: Animalia
- Phylum: Chordata
- Class: Actinopterygii
- Order: Cypriniformes
- Family: Cyprinidae
- Genus: Tor
- Species: T. hemispinus

Binomial name
- Tor hemispinus Y. R. Chen & X. L. Chu, 1985

Species of fish

Tor hemispinus is a species of cyprinid of the genus Tor. It inhabits Yunnan, China, is considered harmless to humans and has a maximum length among unsexed males of 13.3 centimetres (5.2 in). Described in 1985, it has been classified as "data deficient" on the IUCN Red List.
