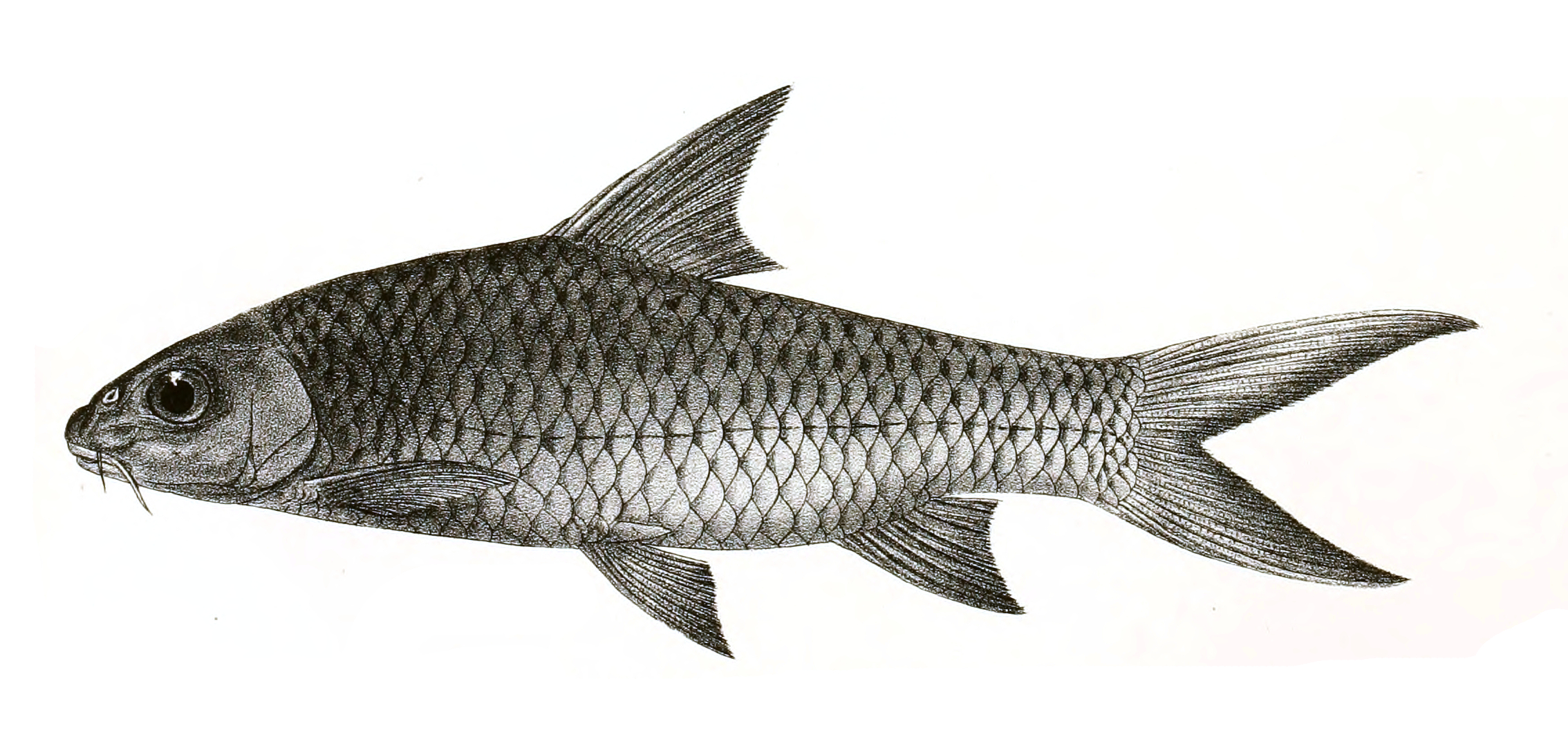

Conservation status
- Critically Endangered (IUCN 3.1)

Scientific classification
- Kingdom: Animalia
- Phylum: Chordata
- Class: Actinopterygii
- Order: Cypriniformes
- Family: Cyprinidae
- Genus: Hypselobarbus
- Species: H. thomassi

Binomial name
- Hypselobarbus thomassi (F. Day, 1874)

Synonyms
- Barbus thomassi Day, 1874; Gonoproktopterus thomassi (Day, 1874); Puntius thomassi (Day, 1874)

= Hypselobarbus thomassi =

Species of fish

Hypselobarbus thomassi (the red Canarese barb) is a critically endangered species of ray-finned fish in the genus Hypselobarbus. It is endemic to the Western Ghats in Karnataka and Kerala, India. This species is potentially a very large fish, growing to 100 cm (39 in) TL, possibly even larger.
