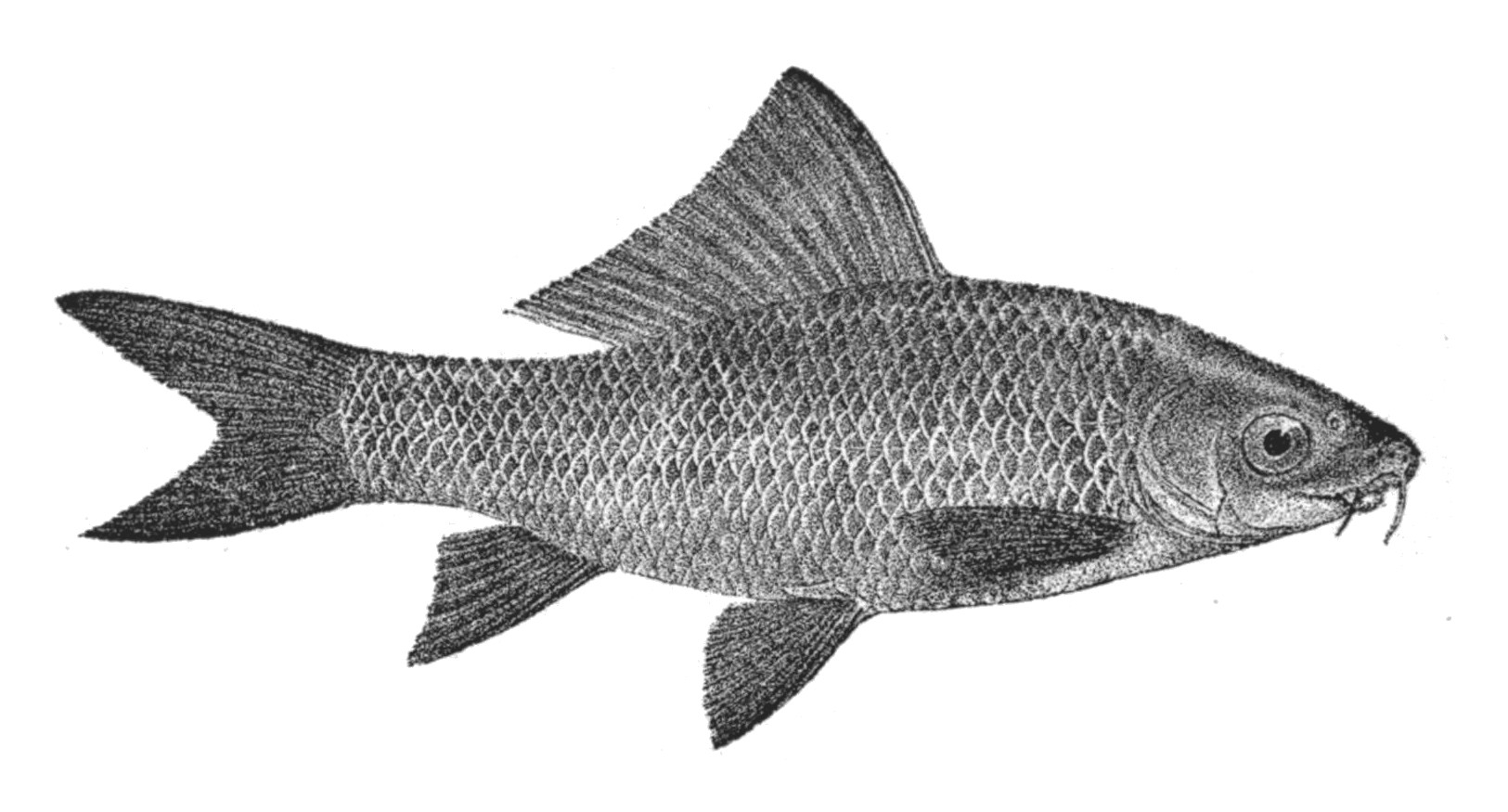

Conservation status
- Least Concern (IUCN 3.1)

Scientific classification
- Domain: Eukaryota
- Kingdom: Animalia
- Phylum: Chordata
- Class: Actinopterygii
- Order: Cypriniformes
- Family: Cyprinidae
- Subfamily: Labeoninae
- Genus: Labeo
- Species: L. calbasu

Binomial name
- Labeo calbasu F. Hamilton, 1822

Synonyms
- Cyprinus calbasu Hamilton, 1822; Catla calbasu (Hamilton, 1822); Morulius calbasu (Hamilton, 1822); Rohita calbasu (Hamilton, 1822); Cirrhina micropogon Valenciennes, 1832; Cyprinus micropogon (Valenciennes, 1832); Labeo velatus Valenciennes, 1841; Rohita belangeri Valenciennes, 1842; Cirrhinus belangeri (Valenciennes, 1842); Rohita reynauldi Valenciennes, 1842

= Orangefin labeo =

Species of fish

The orangefin labeo (Labeo calbasu) is a fish of the carp family Cyprinidae, found commonly in rivers and freshwater lakes in and around South Asia and South-East Asia. Native to Bangladesh and India.

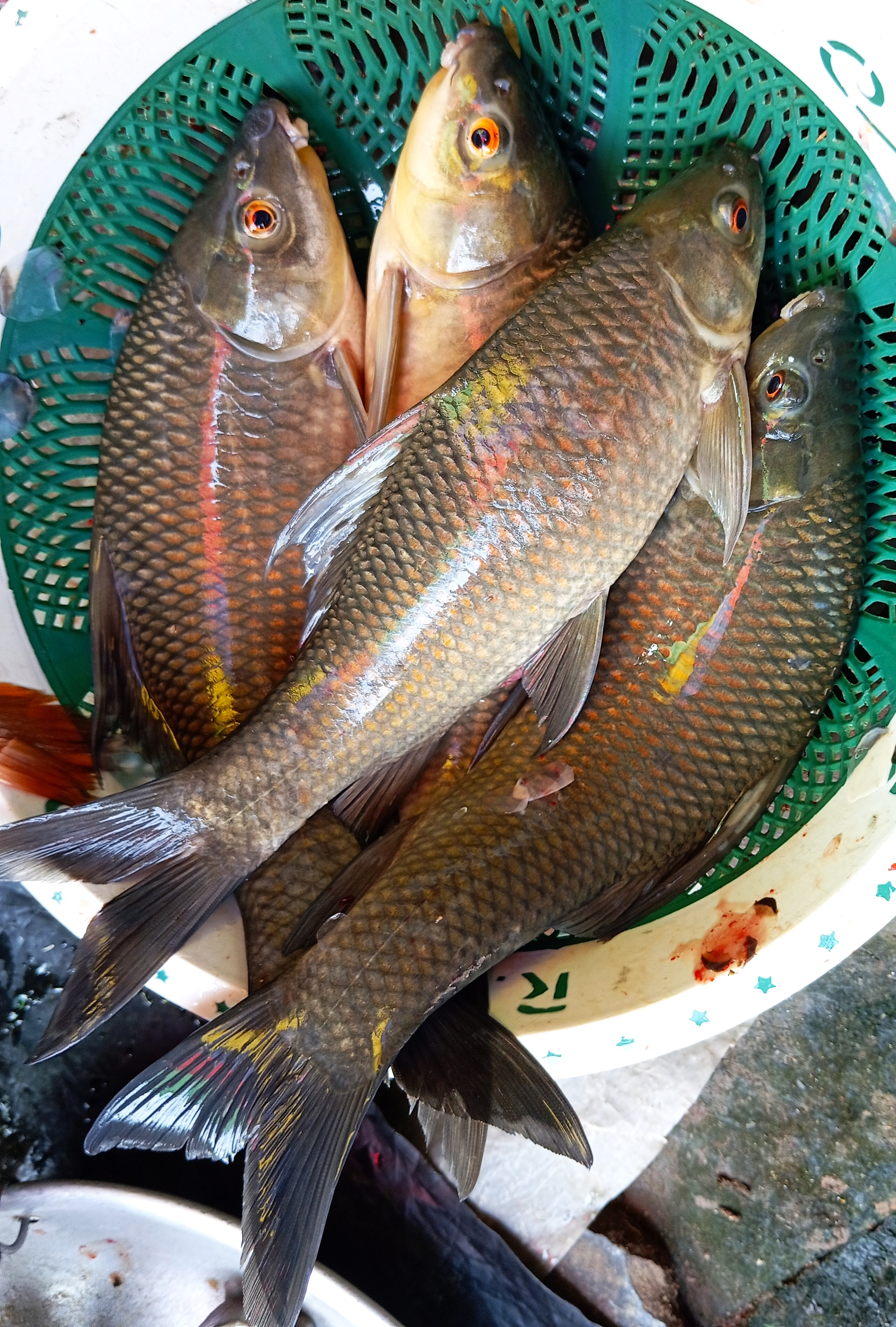
Orangefin labeo (Labeo calbasu), West Bengal, India
