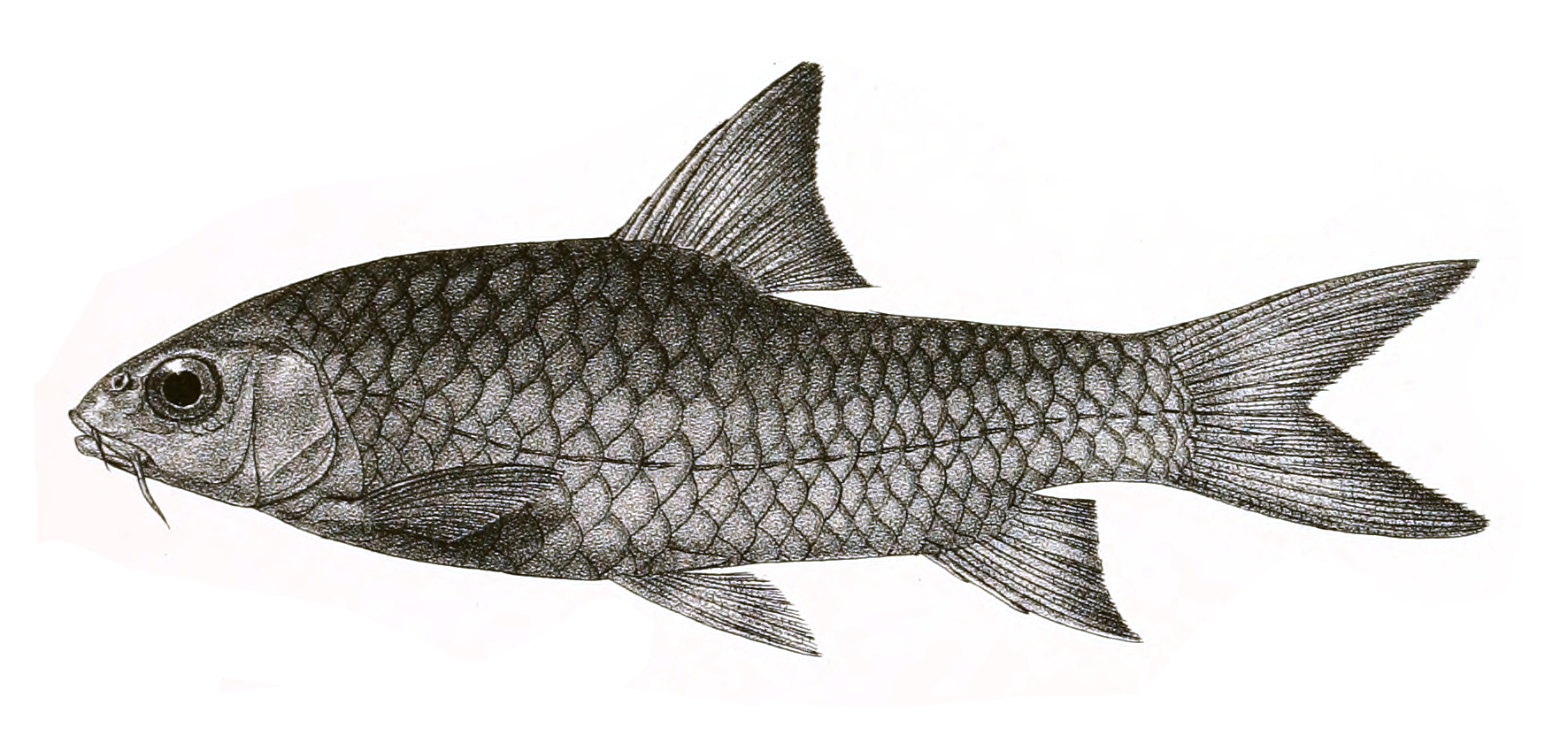

Conservation status
- Least Concern (IUCN 3.1)

Scientific classification
- Kingdom: Animalia
- Phylum: Chordata
- Class: Actinopterygii
- Order: Cypriniformes
- Family: Cyprinidae
- Genus: Hypselobarbus
- Species: H. carnaticus

Binomial name
- Hypselobarbus carnaticus (Jerdon, 1849)

Synonyms
- Barbodes carnaticus (Jerdon, 1849); Barbus carnaticus Jerdon, 1849; Puntius carnaticus (Jerdon, 1849)

= Hypselobarbus carnaticus =

Species of fish

Hypselobarbus carnaticus, also known as the Carnatic carp, is a species of cyprinid fish from the Western Ghats in India where it inhabits riffles and larger pools in rapidly flowing rivers and streams. It prefers to shelter underneath boulders and overhangs. This species can reach a length of 60 centimetres (24 in) TL and has attained a maximum reported weight of 12 kilograms (26 lb). It is a commercially important fish and is also farmed.
