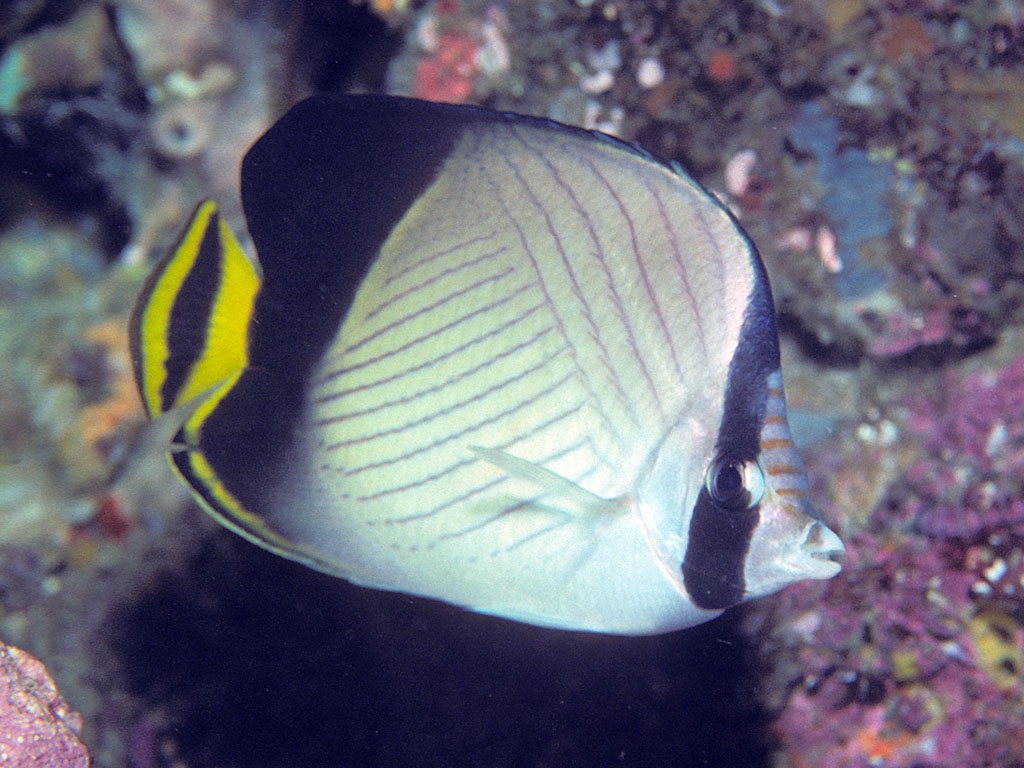

Conservation status
- Least Concern (IUCN 3.1)

Scientific classification
- Kingdom: Animalia
- Phylum: Chordata
- Class: Actinopterygii
- Order: Acanthuriformes
- Family: Chaetodontidae
- Genus: Chaetodon
- Subgenus: Chaetodon (Rabdophorus)
- Species: C. decussatus

Binomial name
- Chaetodon decussatus G. Cuvier, 1829

Synonyms
- Chaetodon vagabundus jordani Ahl, 1923

= Indian vagabond butterflyfish =

Species of fish

The Indian vagabond butterflyfish (Chaetodon decussatus), also known as the blackened butterflyfish or black-finned vagabond, is a species of marine ray-finned fish, a butterflyfish belonging to the family Chaetodontidae. It is found in the Indo-West Pacific, from the Maldives via India, Sri Lanka and the Andaman Sea to the westernmost portion of the Indonesian archipelago.

The Indian vagabond butterflyfish has a silvery-white body marked with diagonal grey lines and with a broad black vertical band running through the eyes. The posterior lower part of the body is largely black. There are yellow markings on the tail and anal fins. Growing to a maximum of 20 cm (nearly 8 in) long, it is found on rich coral reefs and also on rubble and rocky areas. The monogamous adults swim in pairs and may be territorial and aggressive to other Chaetodon; juveniles are solitary. The Indian vagabond butterflyfish feeds largely on algae and coral polyps. They are oviparous.

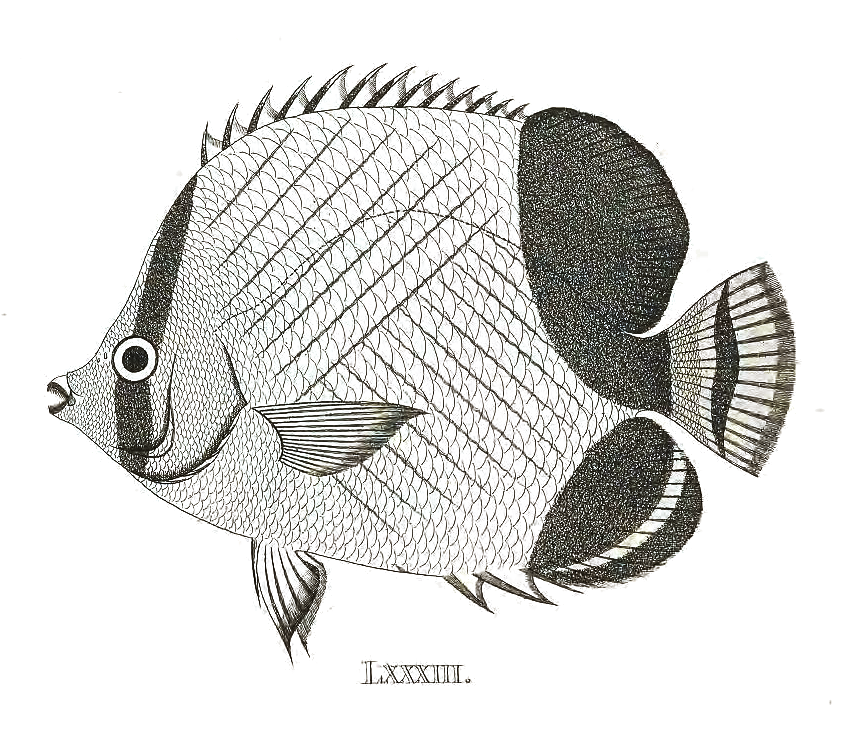
Illustration in Patrick Russell's 1803 book, given the local name of "painah"

The Indian vagabond butterflyfish was first formally described in 1829 by the French anatomist Georges Cuvier (1769–1832), the type locality was given as "India". It belongs to the large subgenus Rabdophorus which might warrant recognition as a distinct genus. In this group, it almost certainly is a rather close relative of the threadfin butterflyfish (C. auriga) and the vagabond butterflyfish (C. vagabundus). C. decussatus might be closer to the threadfin butterflyfish than to the common Vagabond Butterflyfish; as C. vagabundus has yielded abnormal DNA sequence data this is hard to say however. The C. auriga species group shares the characteristic pattern of two areas of ascending and descending oblique lines; species differ conspicuously in hindpart coloration.
