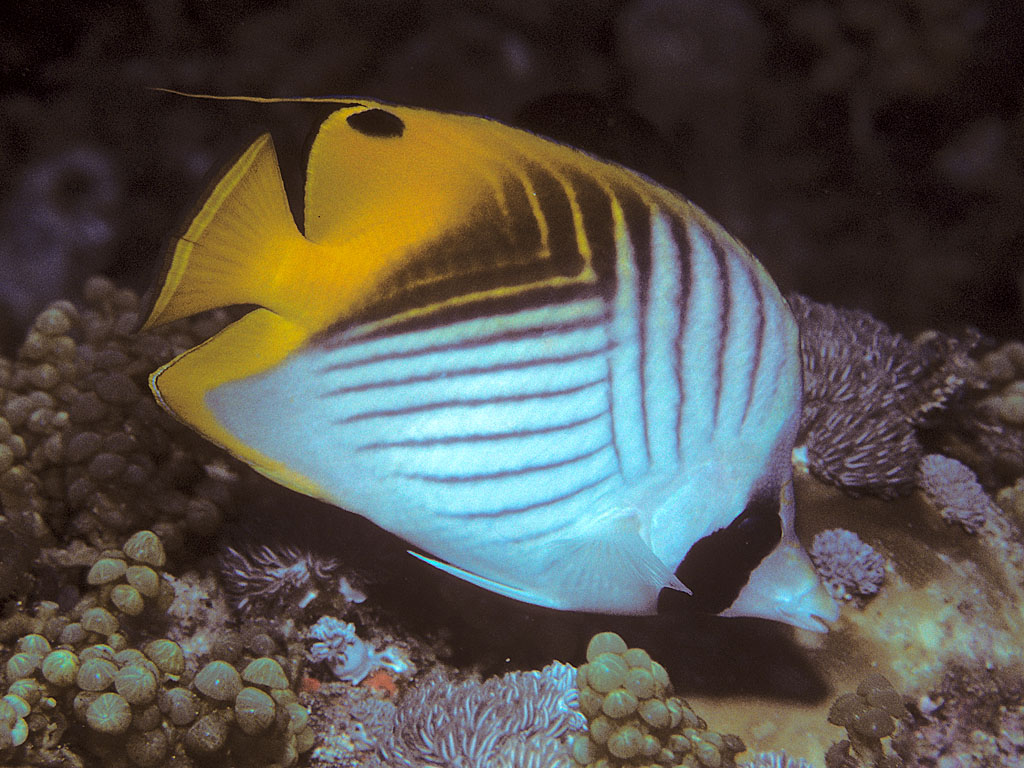
- C. a. setifer (Pemba, Tanzania)
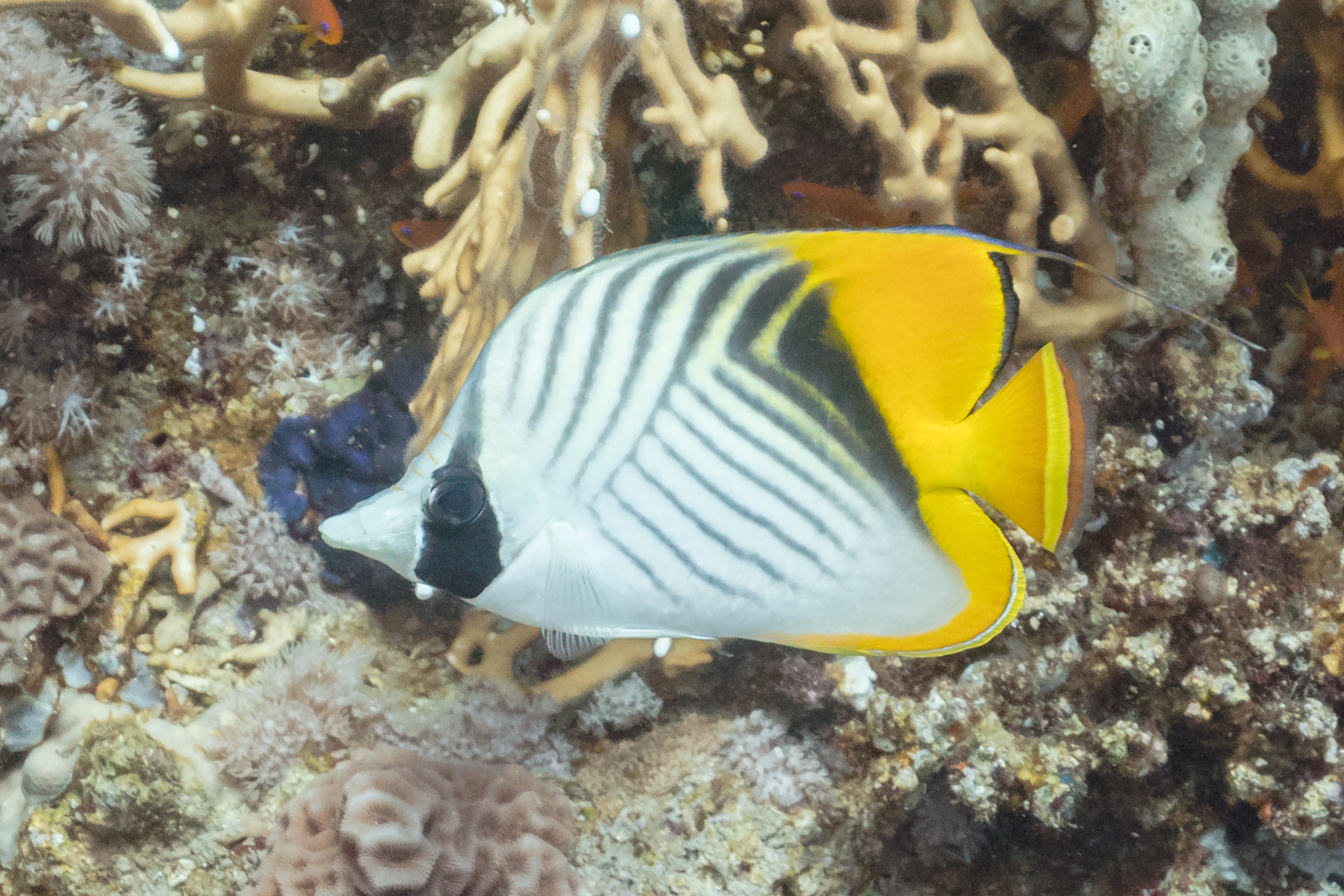
- C. a. auriga (Sharm el-Sheikh, Red Sea)

Conservation status
- Least Concern (IUCN 3.1)

Scientific classification
- Kingdom: Animalia
- Phylum: Chordata
- Class: Actinopterygii
- Division: Teleostei
- Order: Acanthuriformes
- Family: Chaetodontidae
- Genus: Chaetodon
- Subgenus: Chaetodon (Rabdophorus)
- Species: C. auriga

Binomial name
- Chaetodon auriga Forsskål, 1775

Synonyms
- Pomacanthus filamentosus Lacépède, 1802; Anisochaetodon auriga (Forsskål, 1775); Linophora auriga (Forsskål, 1775); Rabdophorus linophora auriga (Forsskål, 1775); Sarothrodus auriga (Forsskål, 1775); Tetragonoptrus auriga (Forsskål, 1775); Chaetodon setifer Bloch, 1795; Chaetodon auriga setifier (Bloch, 1795); Pomacentrus setifer (Bloch, 1795); Tetragonoptrus setifer (Bloch, 1795); Chaetodon sebanus Cuvier, 1831; Chaetodon lunaris Gronow, 1854

= Threadfin butterflyfish =

Species of fish

The threadfin butterflyfish (Chaetodon auriga) is a species of butterflyfish, which are tropical marine ray-finned fish belonging to the family Chaetodontidae. It has a wide Indo-Pacific distribution.

== Distribution ==
Chaetodon auriga is found in the Indo-Pacific region, from the Red Sea and eastern Africa (south to Mossel Bay, South Africa) to the Hawaiian, Marquesas and Ducie islands, north to southern Japan, south to Lord Howe Island and Rapa Iti, at depths of 1–35 metres (3–115 ft). A single specimen was reported recently (2015) in the western Mediterranean Sea off Italy, a likely result of aquarium release.

== Description ==
Chaetodon auriga is up to 23 centimetres (9 in) long. Its body is white with "chevron" markings on the side. The rear edge of the dorsal fin has a prominent black spot with a trailing filament behind it, and a black vertical band runs through the eye. The fish also has a belly patch of descending oblique dark lines and bright yellow fins. Two subspecies are sometimes recognised: Chaetodon auriga auriga occurs in the Red Sea and lacks the dorsal eyespot; Chaetodon auriga setifer is the spotted population occurring outside the Red Sea.

== Taxonomy ==
It belongs to the large subgenus Rabdophorus which might warrant recognition as a distinct genus. Within this group, it is almost certainly a rather close relative of the vagabond butterflyfish (C. vagabundus) and the Indian vagabond butterflyfish (C. decussatus). The C. auriga species group shares the characteristic pattern of two areas of ascending and descending oblique lines, but they differ conspicuously in hindpart coloration.
