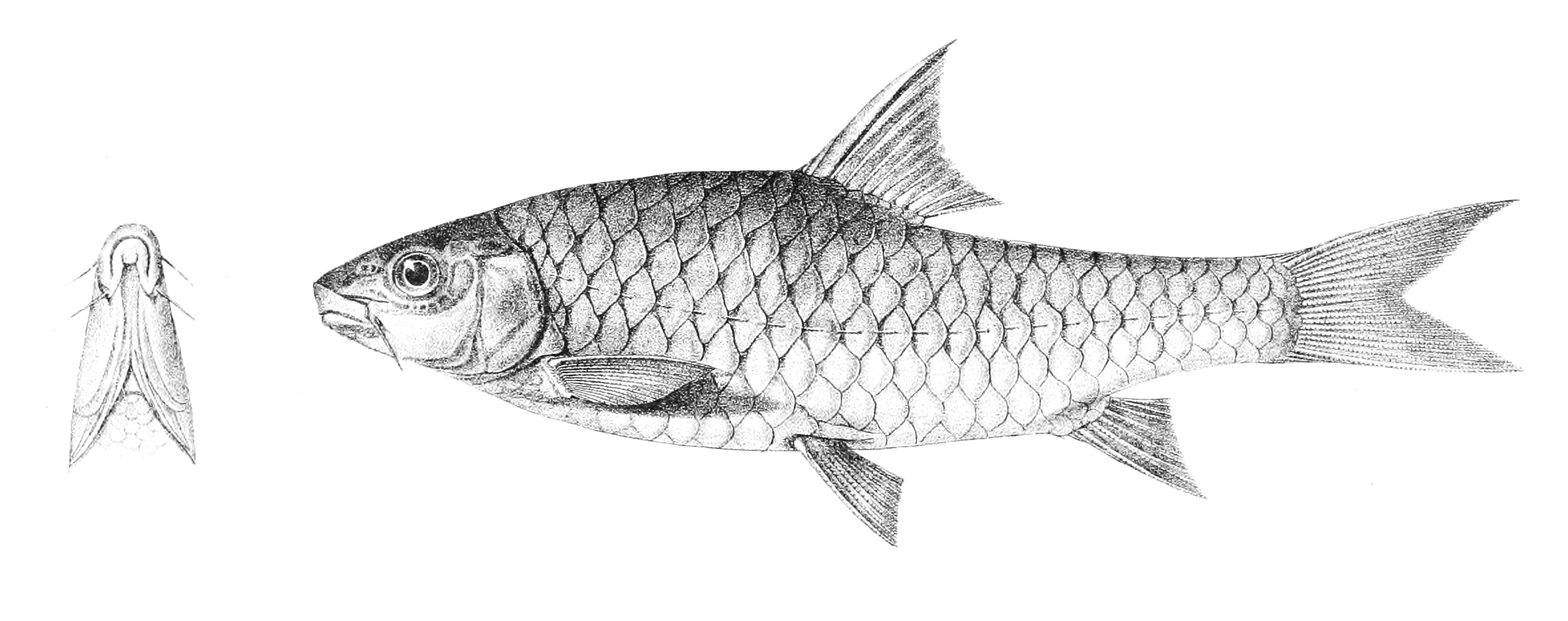

Conservation status
- Near Threatened (IUCN 3.1)

Scientific classification
- Kingdom: Animalia
- Phylum: Chordata
- Class: Actinopterygii
- Order: Cypriniformes
- Family: Cyprinidae
- Genus: Neolissochilus
- Species: N. hexastichus

Binomial name
- Neolissochilus hexastichus (McClelland, 1839)

Synonyms
- Barbus hexastichus McClelland, 1839; Puntius hexastichus (McClelland, 1839)

= Neolissochilus hexastichus =

Species of fish

Neolissochilus hexastichus is a species of freshwater ray-finned fish belonging to the family Cyprinidae, the family which includes the carps, barbs and related fishes. It inhabits the Brahmaputra and Barak River drainages in Assam in India, and Nepal and possibly the Salween basin in Myanmar. and is considered "near threatened" on the IUCN Red List.
