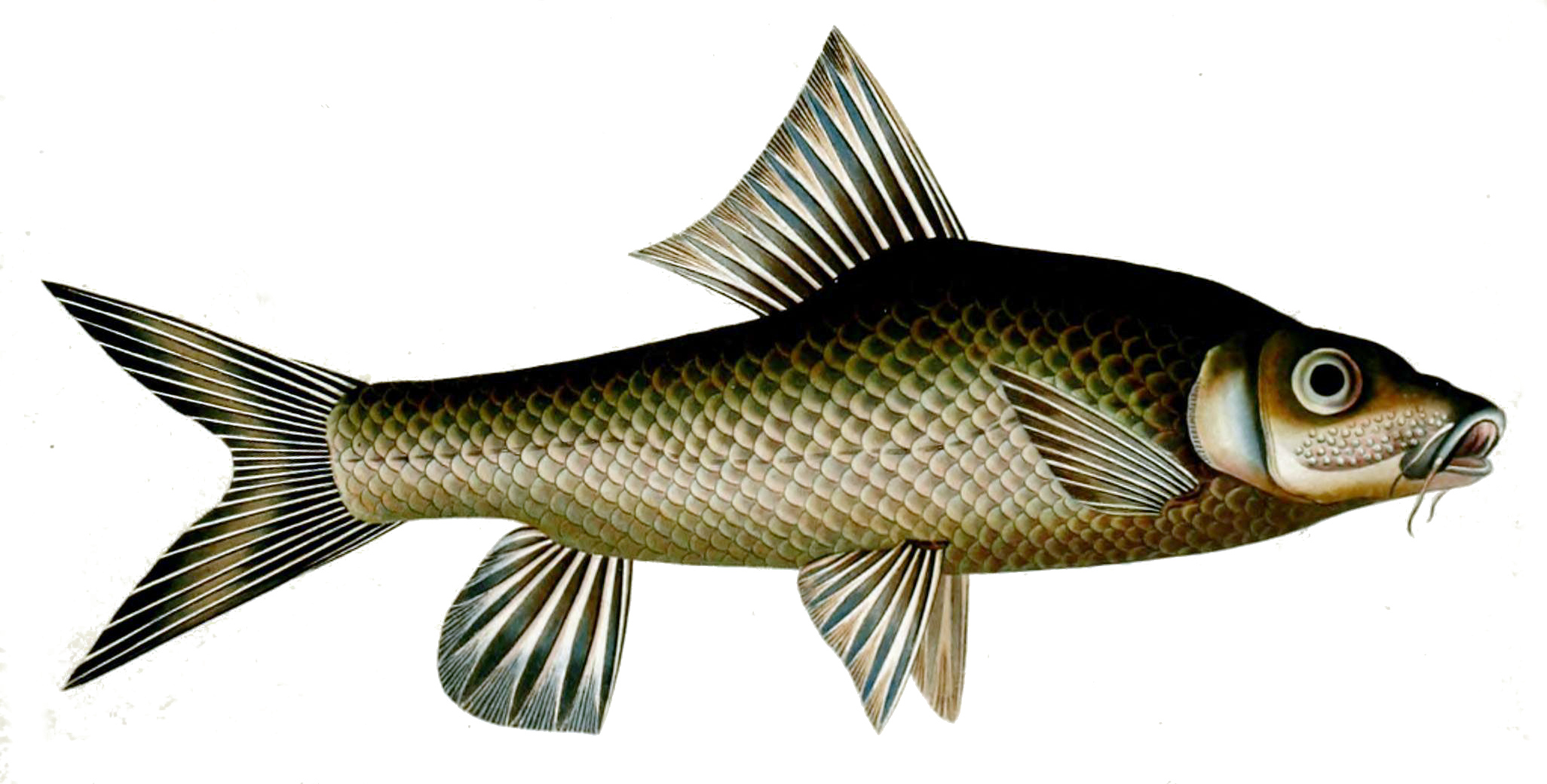
- Hypselobarbus mussullah

Scientific classification
- Kingdom: Animalia
- Phylum: Chordata
- Class: Actinopterygii
- Division: Teleostei
- Order: Cypriniformes
- Family: Cyprinidae
- Subfamily: Torinae
- Genus: Hypselobarbus; Bleeker, 1860

Type species
- Hypselobarbus mussullah Sykes, 1839

Synonyms
- Gonoproktopterus Bleeker, 1860

= Hypselobarbus =

Genus of fishes

Hypselobarbus is a genus of fish in the family Cyprinidae endemic to India.

== Species ==
These are currently recognized species in this genus:

- Hypselobarbus basavarajai Arunachalam, Chinnaraja & Mayden, 2016
- Hypselobarbus bicolor Knight, A. Rai, D'souza, Philip & Dahanukar, 2016
- Hypselobarbus carnaticus (Jerdon, 1849) (Carnatic carp)
- Hypselobarbus curmuca (Hamilton, 1807) (Curmuca barb)
- Hypselobarbus dobsoni (Day, 1876) (Krishna carp)
- Hypselobarbus dubius (Day, 1867) (Nilgiris barb)
- Hypselobarbus gracilis (Jerdon, 1849)
- Hypselobarbus jerdoni (Day, 1870) (Jerdon's carp)
- Hypselobarbus keralaensis Arunachalam, Chinnaraja & Mayden, 2016
- Hypselobarbus kolus (Sykes, 1839) (Kolus)
- Hypselobarbus kurali Menon & Rema Devi, 1995
- Hypselobarbus kushavali Arunachalam, Chinnaraja, Sivakumar & Mayden, 2016
- Hypselobarbus lithopidos (Day, 1874) (Canara barb)
- Hypselobarbus maciveri (Annandale, 1919)
- Hypselobarbus micropogon (Valenciennes, 1842) (Korhi barb)
- Hypselobarbus mussullah (Sykes, 1839) (Humpback mahseer)
- Hypselobarbus nasutus Arunachalam, Chinnaraja & Mayden, 2016
- Hypselobarbus nilgiriensis Arunachalam, Chinnaraja & Mayden, 2016
- Hypselobarbus nitidus Plamoottil & Vineeth, 2022
- Hypselobarbus periyarensis (B. S. Raj, 1941)
- Hypselobarbus procerus Plamoottil, 2022
- Hypselobarbus pulchellus (Day, 1870)
- Hypselobarbus tamiraparaniei Arunachalam, Chinnaraja, Chandran & Mayden, 2014
- Hypselobarbus thomassi (Day, 1874) (Red Caranese barb)
- Hypselobarbus vaigaiensis Arunachalam, Chinnaraja, Chandran & Mayden, 2014
