= Nelliyadi =

Nellyadi
- City
- Nellyadi is a small town Located in Karnataka, India.
- Coordinates: 12.837°N 75.396°E
- Country: India
- State: Karnataka
- Region: Tulunadu

Government
  - Type: Panchayat raj
  - Body: Municipal Council
- Elevation: 120 m (390 ft)

Population (2011)
  - Total: 5,504
  - Density: 80/km^{2} (210/sq mi)

Language
  - Administrative: Kannada,,Tulu
  - Regional: Malayalam Christians Konkkani
- Time zone: UTC+5:30 (IST)
- ISO 3166 code: IN-KA
- Vehicle registration: KA 21
- Website: karnataka.gov.in

Nellyadi is a small town located in the Puttur Taluk of Dakshina Kannada district, in Karnataka, India. This small town Located 275 km far from Bangalore and 70 km far from port city Mangalore. Nellyadi situated under the beauty of Western Ghat. The nearest ghat is Shiradi. This town connected to pilgrimage centre like Dharmasthala, Subramanya, Shishila and Southadka temple.
