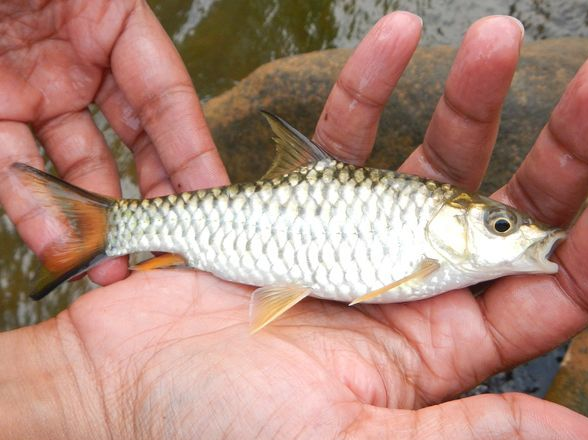
- Tor malabaricus in Karnataka, India

Conservation status
- Endangered (IUCN 3.1)

Scientific classification
- Kingdom: Animalia
- Phylum: Chordata
- Class: Actinopterygii
- Order: Cypriniformes
- Family: Cyprinidae
- Genus: Tor
- Species: T. malabaricus

Binomial name
- Tor malabaricus Jerdon, 1849

= Tor malabaricus =

Species of fish

Tor malabaricus, the Malabar mahseer, is a fish, a species of mahseer native to southwestern India.

== Taxonomy ==
This mahseer possesses many typical Cyprinidae features, with a slim, torpedo-shaped body, plus large head and scales, and four barbels at the corners of the mouth. In the original description, Jerdon says: "Head to whole body as 1:4; height 3 1/2 times in its length... 23 scales along its body." as among the identification characteristics.
Tor malabaricus may be confused with juvenile Tor remadevii, but the distributions should be very different, with Tor remadevii only to be found within the basin of the eastwards-flowing Cauvery River.

There have been several recent papers on the genetics of Tor malabaricus and other mahseer species of India. These papers may help in future identification, although comparisons between Tor malabaricus and Tor khudree should be viewed carefully as despite Pavan-Kumar et al. reporting that "Individuals of Tor putitora, Tor khudree, Tor tor, Tor mahanadicus and Tor malabaricus were collected from respective type locations ", it is known that Tor khudree is no longer to be found at the type locality. Genetic comparisons between T. malabaricus and T. khudree have confirmed that the two are distinct species.

== Distribution ==
This mahseer is confined to the west-flowing rivers and streams of Karnataka, Tamil Nadu and Kerala.

== Ecology ==
It may be expected that Tor malabaricus has similarities with all other mahseer species, being omnivorous, with a diet that likely includes aquatic and terrestrial invertebrates, fruit and vegetation, small amphibians and other fish. It would seem probable that adult fish access headwaters for spawning during high water conditions, although as it inhabits the faster, shorter rivers draining westwards along the Western Ghats, migrations would likely be shorter than other species.

== Conservation ==
This species is currently assigned as Endangered by the IUCN. The major constraining factor in any conservation strategy is the relative lack of understanding of the distribution and ecology of the species and how it interacts with other local fish species within the same habitat.

As with other mahseer species, the main threats are: loss of habitat due to urbanisation, encroachment on flood plains, dam building, sand extraction and pollution. Destructive fishing methods like dynamite, poisoning and electricity are in common use throughout South and Southeast Asia, and may be expected to be a major threat to the sustainability of populations.
In many of the rivers that have, historically, held Tor malabaricus, an emerging threat is deliberate stocking of the mahseer species from Maharastra, Tor khudree. The spread of this fish poses problems for native stocks and it must be considered an invasive species.

It seems likely that the fish deliberately poisoned in a temple pool in Shishla, Karnataka in 1996 would have been Tor malabaricus. Unfortunately, these fish were replaced with Tor khudree stocks from artificial breeding programmes, thus adding to the pressures on native stocks of fish. Temple pools, while useful repositories of local stocks are also extremely vulnerable to diverse habitat pollution incidents.
