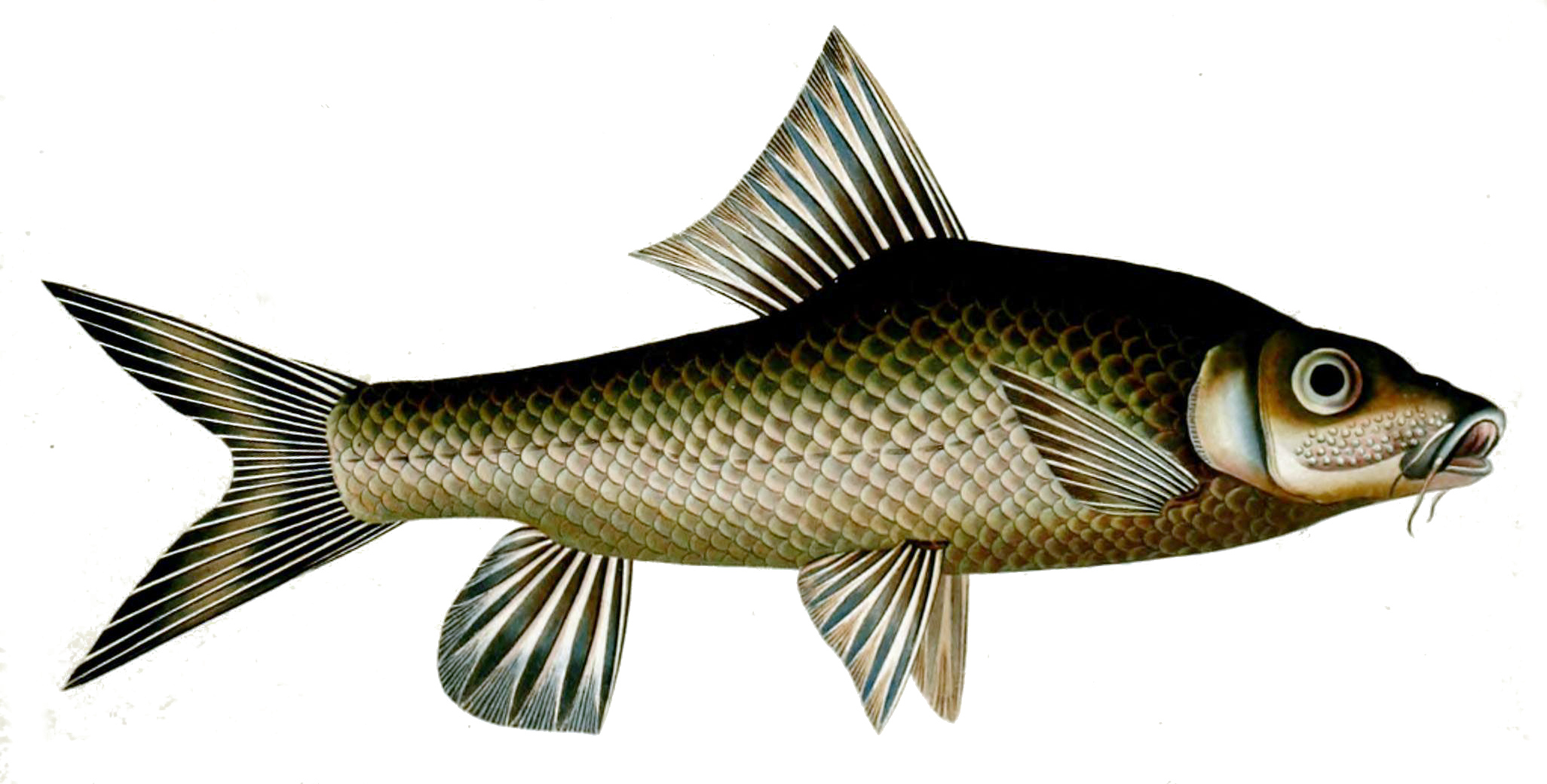

Conservation status
- Critically Endangered (IUCN 3.1)

Scientific classification
- Kingdom: Animalia
- Phylum: Chordata
- Class: Actinopterygii
- Division: Teleostei
- Order: Cypriniformes
- Family: Cyprinidae
- Genus: Hypselobarbus
- Species: H. mussullah

Binomial name
- Hypselobarbus mussullah (Sykes, 1839)

Synonyms
- Barbus mussullah Sykes, 1839; Tor mussullah (Sykes, 1839)

= Hypselobarbus mussullah =

Species of fish

Hypselobarbus mussullah is a species of freshwater ray-finned fish from the Indian endemic genus Hypselobarbus in the carp and minnow family Cyprinidae. Historically, this name was used to refer to a species of humpback mahseer from Southern India, but this was erroneous; the humpback mahseer is now referred to as Tor remadeviae.

== Description ==
Hypselobarbus mussullah is a large cyprinid that has a laterally compressed body which is just over a quarter as deep as it is long (standard length). with a steep dorsal profile forming an obvious hump which runs to the base of the dorsal fin and then slopes gently away to the caudal fin. It has a narrow, thick lipped mouth which is downward facing with two pairs of short barbels behind the mouth. One pair is rostral and one pair is maxillary and this is one of the features that distinguishes it from otherwise similar species. The dorsal fin origin is just in front of the origin of the pelvic fins and the dorsal fin is concave on its upper margin, with a strong, smooth and stiff spine. The caudal fin is deeply forked with small tubercules on the rays. The overall colour is brown with a paler abdomen and it may have dark tips to the fins. It can grow to a maximum total length of 150 cm (59 in) and a weight of 90 kg (200 lb). However, the rod and reel caught record fish was roughly 59 kg (130 lb) and measured 169 cm (67 in) in length while a fish caught by other means was 93 kg (205 lb) and 183 cm (72 in).

The fish was originally described by Sykes as having these meristic features:

Pectoral fins of 16 rays; ventral of 9 rays; dorsal fin of 12 rays, including the first double ray; anal fin of 8 rays, including the first double ray : tail forked, of 24 rays, including the short rays at each exterior side of the insertion of the tail : a remarkable projecting prominence between the upper lip and nostrils, giving to the fish the appearance of being Roman-nosed

— Lieut.-Col. W. H. Sykes

which has been instrumental in clearing the confusion between Hypselobarbus mussulah and Tor remadevii, the lateral line scale count is shown as 42, which clearly demonstrates this fish is not a mahseer (member of genus Tor).

== Distribution ==
H. mussullah is endemic to the Western Ghats in southern India. It has been recorded from the Krishna and possibly the Godavari in the states of Karnataka, Maharashtra and Kerala. It occurs in isolated pockets and the species' distribution is extremely fragmented and the total area of the species range is probably less than 500 km^{2} (190 sq mi).

== Habitat and ecology ==
This species shows a preference for the deeper stretches of clear, fast flowing large jungle streams and rivers in upland areas. It has an omnivorous diet and feeds on fish, crustaceans, molluscs, frogs, fruits and algae.

== Conservation ==
Hypselobarbus mussullah is a sought after fish for anglers from the British colonial times to the present although the actual species involved was not determined as the original description of Barbus mussulah was not considered definitive. The species was redescribed as Hypselobarbus mussullah in the 1990s and 2016 and the species is the type specimen of the genus Hypselobarbus. When this species was classified under Tor mussulah, it was considered synonymous with the orange-finned mahseer (Tor remadeviae), a highly endangered species endemic to the Kaveri basin, unlike the humpback which is endemic to the Krishna basin. When the humpback was reclassified to Hypselobarbus, the orange-finned mahseer was split from it for this reason.
