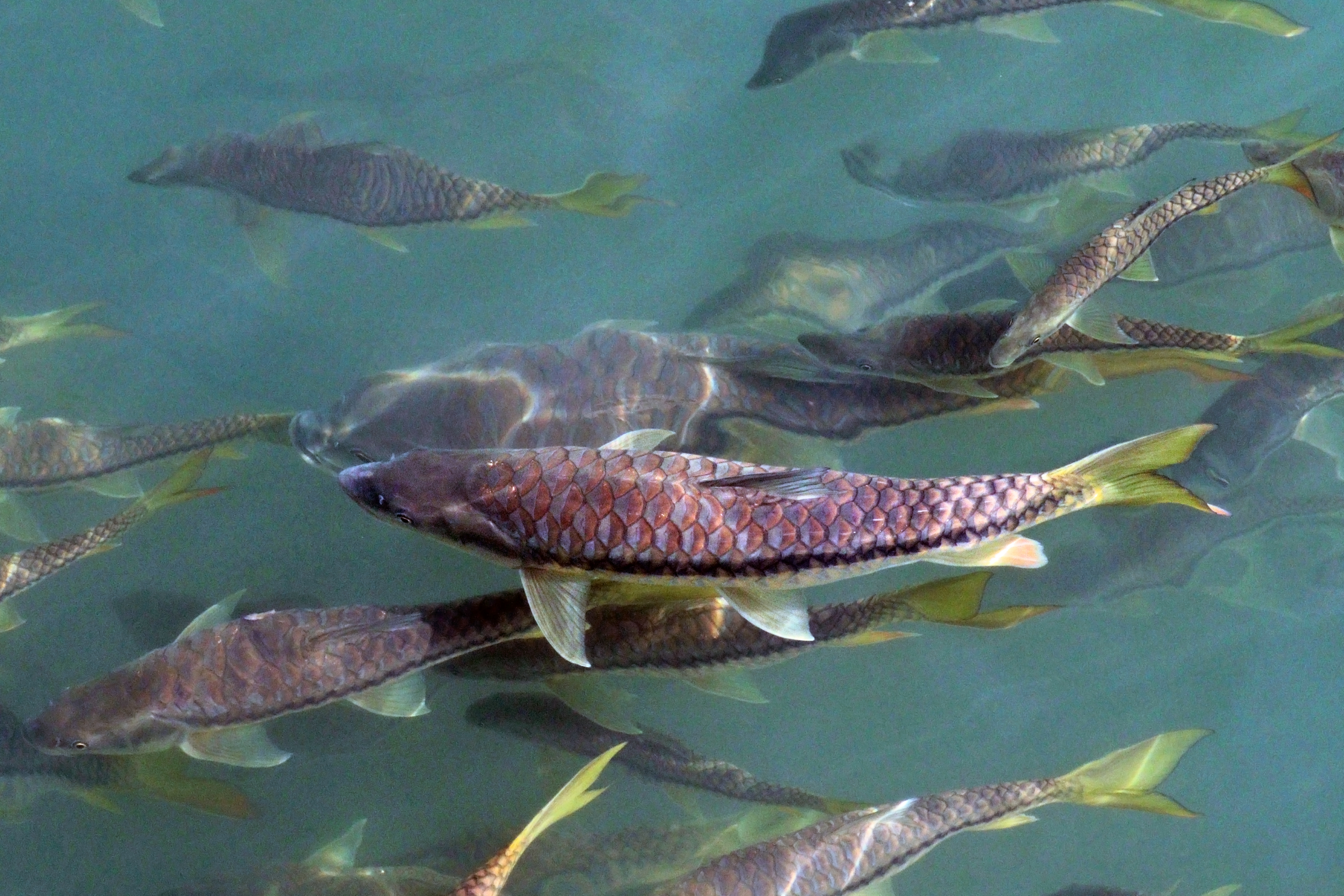
- Golden mahseer (Tor putitora) Babai River, Nepal

Scientific classification
- Kingdom: Animalia
- Phylum: Chordata
- Class: Actinopterygii
- Division: Teleostei
- Order: Cypriniformes
- Family: Cyprinidae
- Subfamily: Torinae; M. S. Karaman, 1971

Type species
- Tor tor (Hamilton, 1822)

= Torinae =

Subfamily of freshwater fishes

Torinae is a subfamily of freshwater ray-finned fishes belonging to the family Cyprinidae, which includes the carps, barbs and related fishes. Fish in this subfamily inhabit the paleotropics, ranging from Africa, the Middle East including the Arabian Peninsula, South Asia, Southeast Asia, and up to Nepal and China. Members of Torinae inhabit both rivers and lakes, with some species ascending into rapids with rocky bottoms for breeding. Like other carp, they are generalist omnivores, eating algae, crustaceans, insects, frogs, other fish, and fruit that fall from overhead trees.

The Asian species were often revered by the cultures native to their range. Due to their size, they are commercially important, being appreciated as game fish as well as highly esteemed food fish, with some species being aquacultured for both food and as ornamentals. Several species have suffered severe declines due to pollution, habitat loss, overfishing, along with introduced species; they are now considered threatened.

== Common names ==
A number of Asian species within the subfamily are known as mahseers, a term originating from the Indian subcontinent as a generic term for large-bodied cyprinids, especially those with barbels and large scales. The term, alternatively rendered as mahsir [ˈmäˌsi(ə)r], mahsur [ˈmäˌsə(r)], mahaseer, or mahasir, has a disputed etymology, though it seems to originate from the Hindi word mahāsir. This word may have ultimately originated from:

- Mahasir, mahasirasha, or mahasiras, from the Sanskrit words mahat (big, great) + śiras ("head"; alternatively "front of body"), though this may merely be an "attempt to give a meaning to the word".
- Massulah, mahasaula, mahasaul, mahasalka, mahā-śalka, mahashol, or mahasol (big-scaled); shol is also the Bengali name for Channa striata, and large mahseers are noted to have scales "as big as the murrel [C. striata]".
- Matsya (Sanskrit for "fish"); name shared with an avatar of Vishnu.
- Mahā-āsya ("great mouth"); proposed by Henry Sullivan (H.S.) Thomas.
- Mahashila, translated by Sadhale and Nene as "stone-like", alluding to the fish's power.
- Mahasher, mahāser, or mahaseer (Persian for "big tiger", or "big lion", in recognition of their gameness); may be a fanciful translation, though is considered by some to be the most likely etymology.

In English, "mahseer" may be used for fish in multiple genera, such as the species of Tor, Neolissochilus, Naziritor, and (erroneously) Hypselobarbus mussullah, though its use is often restricted to the genus Tor, the "true" mahseer. Fish of the other two genera are sometimes distinguished as "lesser mahseer", or "mahseer barb".

In addition, a multitude of local common names are known, as the distribution of Torinae, including the mahseers, encompass a vast geographical region containing hundreds of languages. Mahseers in Indonesia possess a multitude of names owing to the multiethnic composition of the country; in certain parts of Java, they are referred to as ikan dewa; literally God-Fish or Fish of the Gods. Some names are shared with Malay, such as empurau, kelah, semah, or pelian.

== Description ==
Members of this subfamily are united by several features, such as polyploidy, large scales, and a smooth, ossified, last unbranched dorsal-fin ray. As members of the carp family, they possess no teeth in their jaws, instead possessing pharyngeal teeth that they use to crush and masticate food, such as bivalves and gastropods.

These fish are sizeable, with the largest member of this subfamily, the golden mahseer Tor putitora, being known to reach 2.75 m (9 ft 0 in) in total length and 54 kg (119 lb) in weight, though these measurements are exceptional, historical records. Sexual dimorphism is mild if present, with males often being slightly smaller, developing tubercles on their head, and/or possessing brighter coloration, though reliable distinction between sexes is only possible during the breeding season, where ripe females have bulging, soft abdomens and slightly swollen vents.

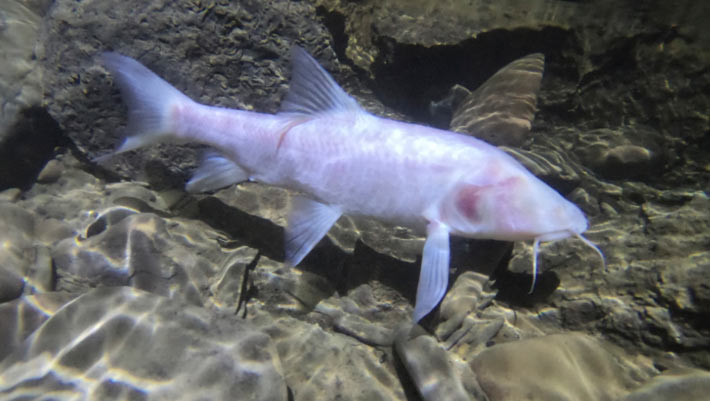
Neolissochilus pnar

Mahseers generally prefer fast-flowing cold-water rivers and streams, especially those with rocky bottoms and deep pools. Two species of Neolissochilus are known to inhabit caves, being N. subterraneus of Thailand and N. pnar of India.

Like typical carp, species of Torinae are generalist feeders, eating a variety of food sources such as detritus (including municipal sewage and buffalo dung), macrophytes, algae of the filamentous and epilithic (aufwuchs) variety, invertebrates such as mollusks, crustaceans, and insects, along with the occasional small fish. The barbels, protrusible and suctorial mouth, along with mud, sand, and debris within the stomach content of Tor spp. is indicative of a bottom-feeding niche. The mbaraga (Acapoeta tanganicae) retains a generalist diet despite the species' morphological specializations for scrape-feeding on aufwuchs. Dietary niche shift is observed, with juveniles consuming more animal matter than the more herbivorous adults.

Migratory habits are well known in the larger species, and most migrations occur for reproduction. Mahseer may have multiple spawning events in a year. Spawning behaviors are triggered by changes in temperature and the monsoon flood. For approximately a week after hatching, larvae of Tor spp. have a semi-quiescent phase where they aggregate on the benthos with their tails facing outwards. After their yolk is spent, the fry start moving actively and feed on zooplankton such as Artemia and Moina. These fish are slow-growing and long-lived.

== Taxonomy ==
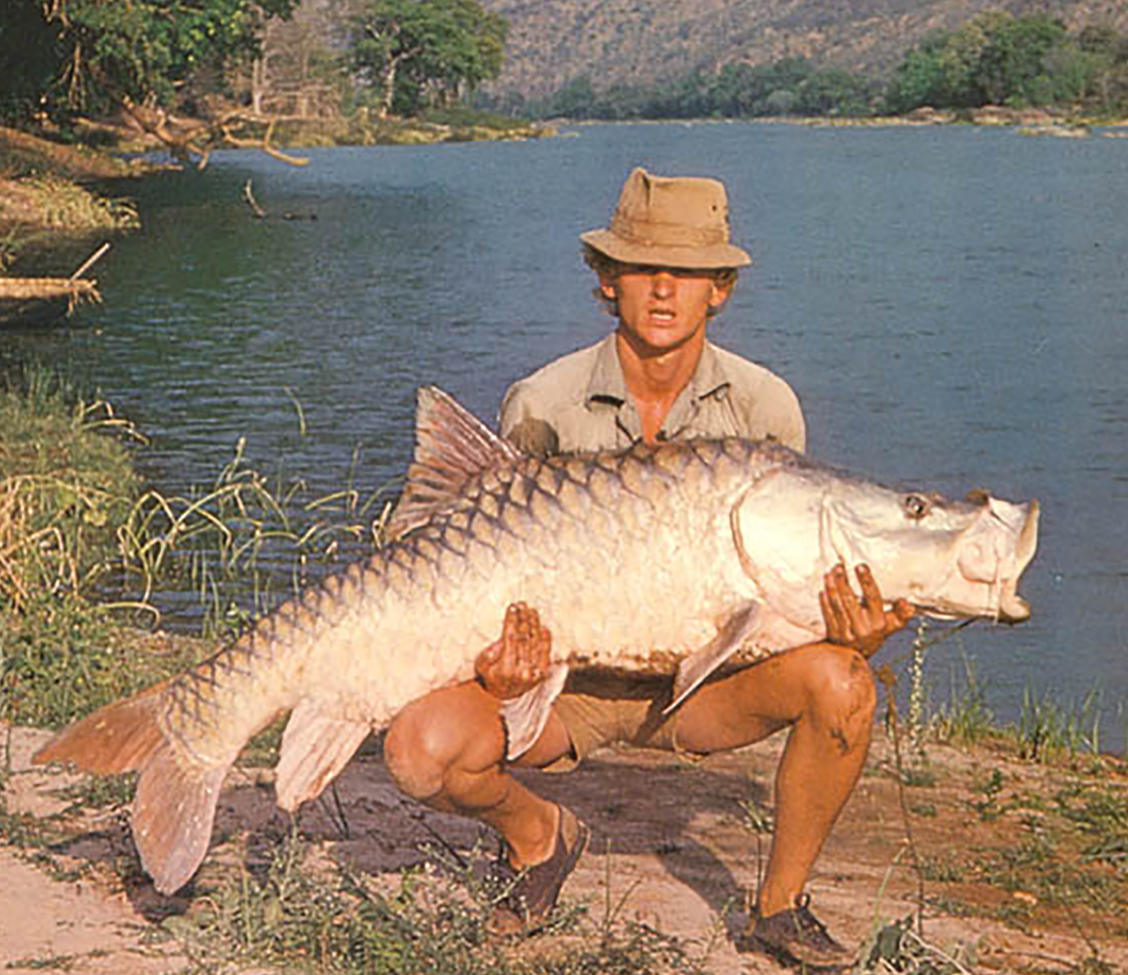
Despite being well known to the angling community for over one-and-a-half centuries, the south Indian humpback mahseer did not have a valid scientific name until 2007, when it was named Tor remadeviae, though it was only in 2018 that this name was conclusively linked to these fish.

The type genus of Torinae, Tor, apparently originates from tora, a word which – in its various altered, corrupted, or otherwise amended forms – may be considered "generic appellations" for large, Gangetic cyprinids. Historically, the name Barbus tor (sensu Day, 1878) was used to describe all "large-scaled barbels" in India.

Torinae contains the following genera:

- Acapoeta Cockerell, 1910
- Arabibarbus Borkenhagen, 2014
- †Atlantor Borkenhagen & Freyhof, 2023
- Carasobarbus Karaman, 1971
- Hypselobarbus Bleeker, 1860
- Labeobarbus Rüppell, 1835
- Lepidopygopsis B. S. Raj 1941
- Mesopotamichthys M. S. Karaman, 1971
- Naziritor Mirza & Javed, 1985
- Neolissochilus Rainboth, 1985
- Osteochilichthys Hora, 1942
- Pterocapoeta Günther, 1902
- Sanagia Holly, 1926
- Tor Gray, 1834

Due to phenotypic plasticity (e;g morphological differences between populations in different water bodies) and/or an unclear initial description, species identification may be difficult to perform. Taxonomic revisions were done in an attempt to resolve this issue, and is likely still needed. For example, Neolissochilus benasi has been consistently found in a basal position to the rest of Neolissochilus and Tor, having diverged earlier from both clades, thus "N." benasi may be moved to a new genus in the future.

The following cladogram is based on a maximum likelihood phylogram based on a set of mitochondrial markers recovered by a 2017 study:

- - - - - - - - - Mesopotamichthys sharpeyi
                - Arabibarbus
                  - Arabibarbus hadhrami
                  - Arabibarbus grypus
              - Carasobarbus
                ⊞
                ⊟
                - Eastern group
                  - - Carasobarbus canis
                    - - Carasobarbus exulatus
                      - - Carasobarbus chantrei
                        - - - Carasobarbus luteus I
                            - Carasobarbus apoensis
                          - Carasobarbus luteus II
                  - - - Carasobarbus sublimus
                      - Carasobarbus kosswigi I
                    - Carasobarbus kosswigi II
                - Western group
                  - Carasobarbus harterti
                  - Carasobarbus fritschii
            - Labeobarbus African hexaploids
              ⊞
              ⊟
              - Labeobarbus beso
              - - Labeobarbus caudovittatus
                - - Labeobarbus ethiopicus
                  - Labeobarbus intermedius
          - Pterocapoeta maroccana
        - - Tor
          - Neolissochilus
      - Hypselobarbus
    - Barbus, Pethia, Enteromius, Cyprinus, Carassius, Barbonymus, Gymnocypris
  - Labeo
- Alburnus alburnus

The following cladogram is based on a 2024 study of cyprinid mitogenomes and its resultant maximum likelihood phylogenetic tree:

- - - - - - Tor
            ⊞
            ⊟
            - - - - Tor khudree
                  - Tor malabaricus
                - - Tor tambra
                  - Tor tambroides
                - Tor barakae
              - - - Tor putitora
                  - Tor mosal mahanadicus
                - Tor tor
            - - Tor sinensis
              - Tor douronensis
          - Neolissochilus
            ⊞
            ⊟
            - - - - Neolissochilus hendersoni
                  - Neolissochilus soroides
                - - Neolissochilus heterostomus
                  - Neolissochilus stracheyi
              - Neolissochilus qiaojiensis
            - - Neolissochilus hexagonolepis
              - Neolissochilus hexastichus
        - Neolissochilus benasi
      - Labeobarbus
        ⊞
        ⊟
        - Labeobarbus intermedius
        - Labeobarbus sp. Lucien
    - Hypselobarbus
      ⊞
      ⊟
      - - Hypselobarbus pulchellus
        - Hypselobarbus jerdoni
      - Hypselobarbus thomassi
  - - - - - Acrossocheilus spp.
          - Onychostoma spp.
        - Onychostoma spp. (incl. Acrossocheilus yunnanensis)
      - Spinibarbus spp.
    - - Cyprinus spp.
      - Procypris spp.
- Labeo spp.

The following cladogram is based on a Bayesian phylogenetic tree from a 2025 study analyzing 13 mitochondrial PCGs and two ribosomal RNA genes:

- - Probarbinae
    Catlocarpio siamensis
  - Garrini
    Garra orientalis
- Torinae
  - Naziritor chelynoides
  - - - Lepidopygopsis typus
      - Hypselobarbus spp.
        ⊞
        ⊟
        - Hypselobarbus thomassi
        - - Hypselobarbus jerdoni
          - Hypselobarbus pulchellus
    - - Neolissochilus benasi
      - - Labeobarbus intermedius
        - - Neolissochilus spp.
            ⊞
            ⊟
            - - Neolissochilus hexagonolepis
              - - Neolissochilus hexastichus
                - Neolissochilus pnar
            - - Neolissochilus qiaojiensis
              - - - Neolissochilus hendersoni
                  - Neolissochilus soroides
                - - Neolissochilus stracheyi
                  - Neolissochilus heterostomus
          - Tor spp.
            ⊞
            ⊟
            - Tor douronensis
            - - - Tor putitora
                - Tor mosal
              - - Tor sinensis
                - - - Tor tambra
                    - Tor tambroides
                  - - - Tor khudree
                      - Tor malabaricus
                    - - Tor barakae
                      - Tor tor

The Asian genera are more basal than the African genera, and are tetraploids (2n≈100). According to studies of mitochondrial DNA and RAG1, the more derived hexaploid genera (2n≈150) are thought to have arisen due to a hybridization event in prehistory, where ancestral tetraploid torines reproduced with males of Cyprinion or similar species (which are diploid; 2n≈50), with the resultant offspring colonizing West Asia and Africa.

== Relation to humans ==
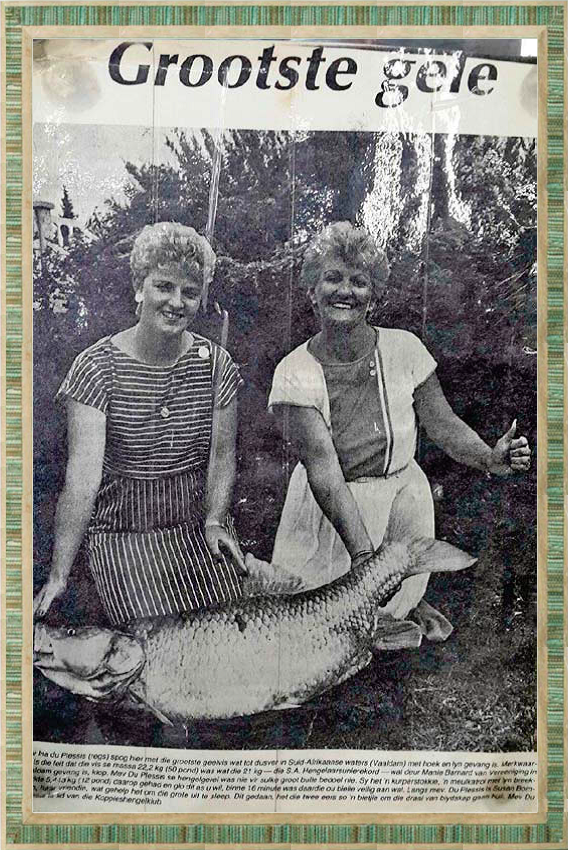
22.2 kg (49 lb) Labeobarbus kimberleyensis; South African open record

Torines are currently of interest for both recreational fishing, being highly valued as game fish, and for aquaculture, where they are reared as food, but also to improve the wild stocks. It is noted that mahseer inhabiting jungles may sometimes be poisonous; after consuming certain fruit (such as those of "Tarnktogenos kerzzii" (=Hydnocarpus kurzii)) their flesh is said to induce a delirious effect. A variety of methods are used when fishing torine fish, including poison. Mahseers have a high market price, with cultured fish often pricing around $30-50 dollars per kg, and wild-caught fish costing up to $250 per kg; mahseers are one of the most expensive freshwater fish products, and are thus cultured in Malaysia and Indonesia.

Experimental aquaculture has resulted in a number of mahseer hybrids: an unknown species of Tor was crossed with Labeo rohita in an effort to develop a fast-growing yet generalist-feeding offspring. Other hybrids include Tor tor × T. khudree, with offspring intermediate in morphology, T. putitora × "T. mussullah", which may be bred through hypophysation or when the parents are provided a high protein diet, feed additives, and flowing water, and T. tambroides × Barbonymus gonionotus, also through induced spawning.

Juvenile and mahseer eggs from India have reportedly been transported to the Laotian Mekong and Papua New Guinea for stocking purposes; the eggs are apparently air-transportable after 24 hours of hardening, and when packed within layers of moist cotton.

=== Pre-modern era ===
Mahseers were revered by the isolated tribal societies of India, being "afforded a saintly status as God's Fishes".

Archaeologists working at sites from the Indus Valley Civilisation (3300–1300 BCE) collected pottery decorated with fish motifs as well as fish bones left in middens. Hora interpretated these motifs as various species common today in the Indus Basin, including mahseer. During his study of the fish bones, the ethnoarchaeologist Dr William R. Belcher discovered that while fish comprised a substantial portion of this civilization's diet, largely being the bones of Indian carp and catfish, bones of mahseer were extremely rare if present at all; it has been suggested that this is evidence of the mahseer's high cultural value for these peoples.

Scale armour fashioned from mahseer scales are known from both Sarawak and Pune. The people of Nagaland used mahseer pharyngeal teeth for decoration, and the nearby Bodo people fashioned their gill plates to create the muri, an instrument similar to the oboe.

References to masculine "mahseer-like" figures are found throughout Hindu religious scriptures, symbols, motifs, sculptures, and in ancient literature.

During the later period of the Chalukya dynasty, under the Western Chalukya Empire, King Someshvara III writes of fishing within the rivers and seas of his kingdom, which encompass areas now known to be inhabited by Tor remadeviae, Tor malabaricus, and Tor khudree; he explicitly names the "mahashila", "large river fish(es) of the scaly type", and details the equipment, bait, and angling techniques for a wide variety of fish types, including mahseer; this account "provides robust evidence that the art of recreational angling was practiced in ancient India since the early twelfth century".

=== British India ===
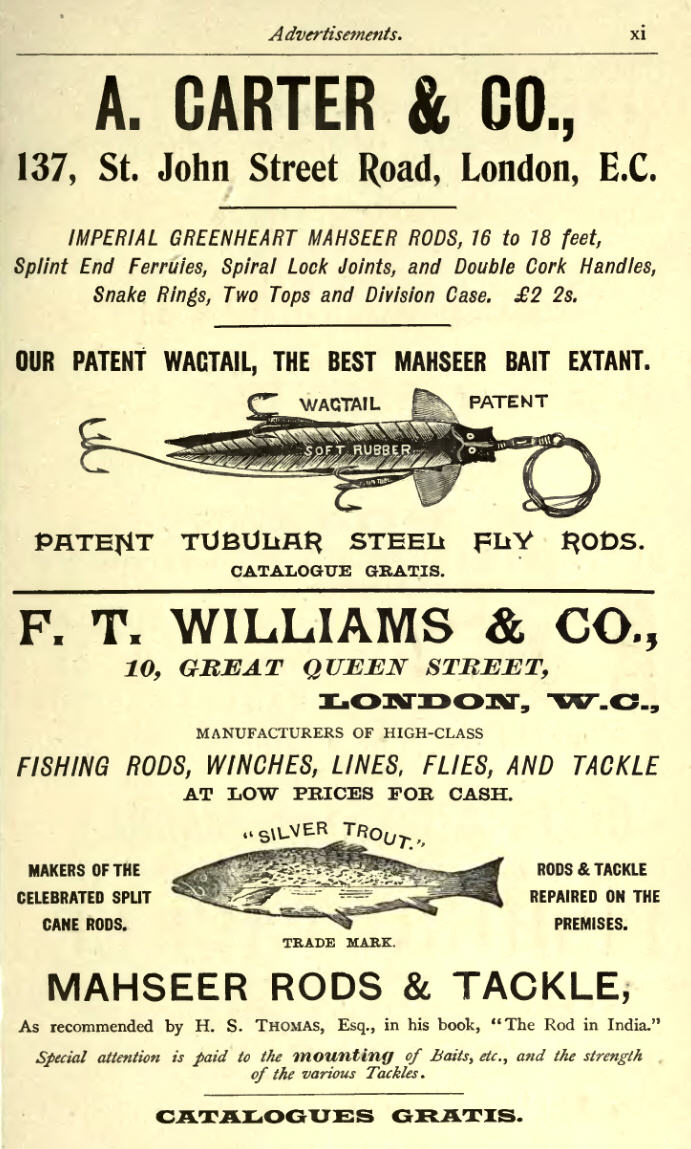
Advertisement for Mahseer fishing tackle 1897

Francis Buchanan-Hamilton was the first to scientifically describe species from this group in 1822, including what would become the type species of the subfamily; Cyprinus tor. H.S. Thomas gives a description of south Indian followers of Hinduism equating mahseers with Matsya, one of the god Vishnu's avatars who is responsible for saving Manu from the flood. This tale is common in many of the classic Hindu texts, with the first reference being in the Shatapatha Brahmana, part of the Vedas body of works dated from 1500 to 400 BCE.

Mahseers were first mentioned as an angling challenge by the Oriental Sporting Magazine in 1833, quickly becoming a favorite quarry of British anglers living in India. Many of those stationed in India enjoyed angling for mahseer, which they compared to the thrill of catching a salmon 'back home'. Indeed, H.S. Thomas, author of one of the first books on angling in the colonies said "the mahseer shows more sport for its size than a salmon". They also produced guidebooks and penned letters to sporting journals such as The Field and Fishing Gazette.

The Mysore Palace houses a number of taxidermied trophy mahseer.

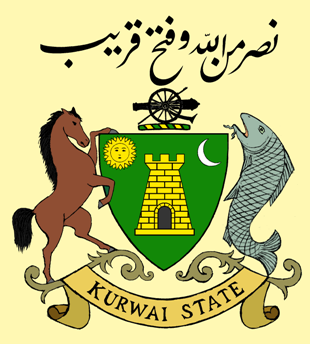
Kurwai State coat of arms with a Mahseer as supporter.

The mahseer was an important symbol in the heraldry of certain Muslim-ruled former princely states of the Subcontinent such as Baoni, Bhopal, Kurwai and Rampur. Dost Mohammad Khan's son Yar Mohammad received from Nizam-ul-Mulk the insignia of the Maha Muratib (the dignity of the Fish). The insignia became part of the Bhopal State's coat of arms.

The Mahseer fish as an emblem of the highest honour in royalty is allegedly of Persian origin and was adopted by the courts of Oudh and the Paigah nobles of Hyderabad State, being later passed down to other states of the area.

Translocations of mahseer within India have occurred since at least the 1850s; these were intended to improve angling locales or in an attempt to augment declining stocks. Translocations occurred in the Lakes of Kumaon hills, Bhimtal, Nainital, Naukuchiatal, and Sattal Lake, which were stocked with mahseer by Sir H. Ramsey in 1858 from stocks brought from the rivers Gaula and Sharda. According to Walker in his 'Angling in the Kumaon Lakes', the Bhimtal stocking was less successful, until a second batch of fish were introduced in 1878.

Dr Raj, Fisheries Development Officer in United Provinces, in his 1945 report on the decline of mahseer stocks in the lakes says: "From all reports these isolated lakes had hardly any fish in them before the introduction of mahseer." This is clearly a misunderstanding of the history of mahseer in the lakes, as Walker earlier says:

When I first angled in Nainital Lake, in 1863 and 1864, there were comparatively few large mahsir in it; there were shoals of the lake fish (Barbus Chilinoides) and many small trout (Barilius Bola). A morning's catch would include a couple of small mahsir, eight or nine 'lake-fish' and two or three trout. Gradually the mahsir have reduced the numbers of the other fish until it is a rare circumstance to catch a 'lake-fish' with the fly, and I have not for many years seen a single trout, although I heard of one being caught last year by a troller.

— Walker, W., Angling in the Kumaun Lakes: With a Map of the Kumaun Lake Country (1888)

The inference must be that the introductions of mahseer into the lakes caused the unexpected decline of several native fish stocks, either due to competition, or by direct predation and that the earlier fish stocks were notable.

=== Conservation ===
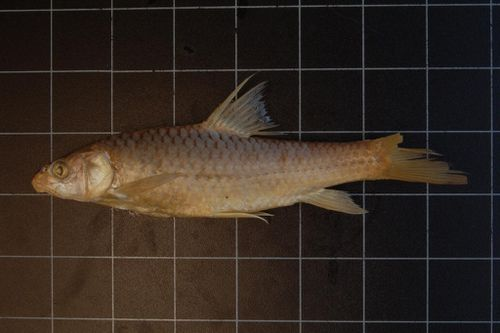
The giant Atlas barbel was recognized as belonging to its own distinct genus Atlantor two decades after its last sighting; the species is now deemed extinct.

Many species of Torinae are poorly understood ecologically; around half of Tor species are considered data deficient. The 21st century has seen the advent of electronic tagging to determine the movement of mahseer.

Hydrological engineering, such as the construction of dams, is thought to be a major cause in the population decline of migratory Torinae, along with other causes of habitat destruction such as destructive fishing practices, pollution, and sand mining. Activities on land, such as deforestation, uncontrolled logging, and agriculture, whose runoff reduces water quality, is also a threat; exposure to pesticides has been proven to hinder growth and feeding. Targeting the spawning grounds during spawning season may be especially impactful to the population.

Though not verified in mahseer, other migratory fish experience disruptions in their migratory patterns after hatchery stocks were introduced to the population, which may "prove to be the end for natural spawning behavior".

Hatcheries often rely on induced spawning, such as through the application of ovaprim, but successful spawning has been achieved through "photo-thermal manipulation" (by exposing adult mahseer to adjustable artificial light levels; see also artificial light supplementation). Artificial waterways mimicking natural lake-and-river systems have also been successful in achieving spawning behaviors which produced viable eggs. Hatchery broodstocks often have high homozygosity, which indicates high levels of inbreeding; methods of mitigation may include selecting for parent fish from different stocks or populations. Alternatively, a ranching system may hold promise: larvae are reared to advanced fingerling stage within artificial channels adjacent to the main river before being released into the wild. This method has shown success with Pacific salmon.

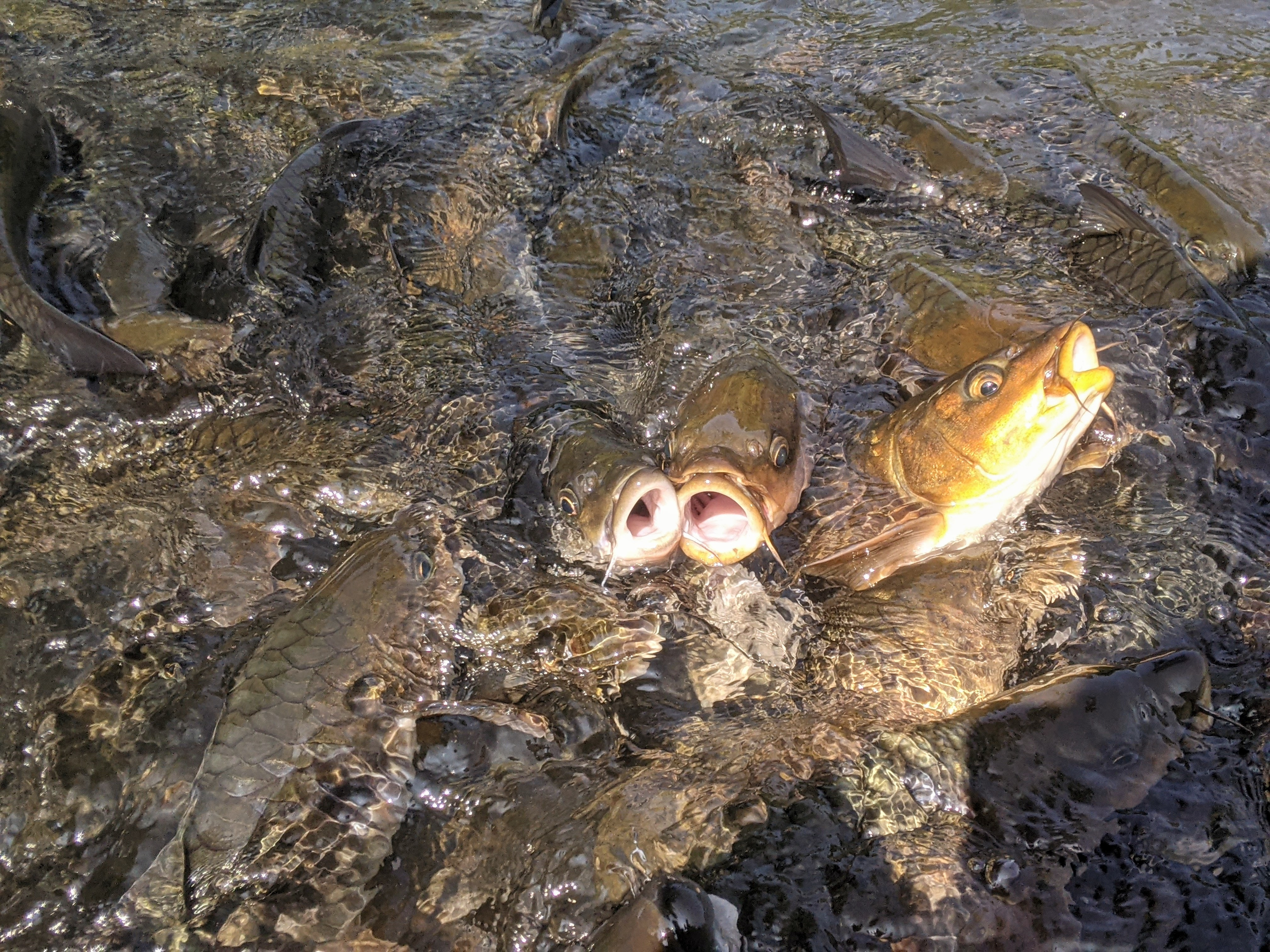
Mahseers being fed in Shishila

In India, many states have adopted mahseer as their State Fish. Arunachal Pradesh, Himachal Pradesh, Jammu and Kashmir and Uttarakhand all have the golden mahseer, Nagaland has the chocolate mahseer (Neolissochilus hexagonolepis), Odisha has the 'Mahanadi mahseer' (Tor mosal mahanadicus), and Karnataka is considering changing its State Fish from Carnatic carp to the Critically Endangered Tor remadeviae.

Mahseers are culturally protected in India while in the vicinity of certain sites, such as temples and bathing ghats, where they are protected from fishing and become "almost tame" due to abundant offerings of feed by visitors. These "temple sanctuaries" or "temple pools", which are sometimes centuries-old, often support dense accumulations of mahseer outside of the monsoon season, which may precipitate risks of mass mortality if these areas become polluted or poisoned, such as with the 1996 poisoning of the fish near Shishileshwara temple, Shishila. An instance of mass mortality (known as a fish kill) occurred in early February 2026, which affected the sacred mahseer of the Balong Kramat Cigugur tourist attraction in Kuningan Regency, West Java. It is thought that this fish kill was caused by the mahseers' declining body condition due to poor water quality, or lowered temperatures following rainfall.

== Additional sources ==
- Nautiyal, Prakash, ed. 1994. Mahseer: The Game Fish. Natural History, Status and Conservation Practices in India and Nepal. Rachna.
- Ambak, M.A., Ashraf, A.H. and Budin, S. 2007. Conservation of the Malaysian Mahseer in Nenggiri Basin through Community Action. In: Mahseer, The Biology, Culture and Conservation. Malaysian Fisheries Society Occasional Publication No.14, Kuala Lumpur 2007:217–228
- National Agricultural Technology Project, 2004. Germplasm inventory, evaluation and gene banking of freshwater fishes. World Bank funded Project MM, No: 27/28/98/NATP/MM-III, 18–32p. National Bureau of Fish Genetic Resources, Lucknow India.
- Mohindra, V.; Khare, Praveen; Lal, K. K.; Punia, P.; Singh, R. K.; Barman, A. S. & Lakra, W. S. (2007). "Molecular discrimination of five Mahseer species from Indian peninsula using RAPD analysis". Acta Zoologica Sinica. 53 (4): 725–732. Archived from the original on 2012-04-26.
