= Pterocapoeta =

Conservation status
- Vulnerable (IUCN 3.1)

Scientific classification
- Kingdom: Animalia
- Phylum: Chordata
- Class: Actinopterygii
- Division: Teleostei
- Order: Cypriniformes
- Family: Cyprinidae
- Subfamily: Torinae
- Genus: Pterocapoeta; Günther, 1902
- Species: P. maroccana

Binomial name
- Pterocapoeta maroccana Günther, 1902

Synonyms
- Labeobarbus maroccanus (Günther, 1902); Varicorhinus maroccanus (Günther, 1902)

Species of fishes

Pterocapoeta is a monospecific genus of freshwater ray-finned fish belonging to the family Cyprinidae, the family which includes the carps, barbs and related fishes. The only species in the genus is Pterocapoeta maroccana, commonly known as the Atlas scraper This taxon is sometimes placed in the afrotropical genus Labeobarbus but this taxon, and the extinct Atlantor which was also placed in that genus, are separated from Labeobarbus sensu stricto by the Sahara. The Atlas scraper is endemic to Morocco where it is found in the upper catchment of the Oum Er-Rbia River. The maximum published total length of this species is 40 cm (16 in).
