= Shiradi =

Shiradi Shirady
- village
- Location in Karnataka, India Shiradi (India)
- Coordinates: 12.8441°N 75.5431°E
- Country: India
- State: Karnataka
- Districts: Dakshina Kannada, Hassan

Languages
  - Official: Kannada & Tulu
- Time zone: UTC+5:30 (IST)

Shiradi is a village on the Mangaluru to Bengaluru section of National Highway 75. The village is situated in Puttur taluk of Dakshina Kannada district. The nearest town is Nelliyadi which is at a distance of approximately 15 km.

== Geography ==
The Shiradi Ghats, a section of the Western Ghats near Shiradi, are popular destinations for trekking.

The Shiradi Ghats are situated in an ecologically sensitive region. The area has undergone environmental degradation due to deforestation and the submergence of rainforest areas, largely associated with hydroelectric project development. These activities have drawn criticism from environmental organisations. In December 2009, a lone elephant was sighted crossing the National Highway in the region.

== Transportation ==
The National Highway 75 runs through Shiradi. It has been reported to be in poor condition. It was previously upgraded by the National Highways Authority of India at a cost of ₹260 million.

In 2012, the Government of Karnataka got assistance from the Japan International Cooperation Agency (JICA) to construct a tunnel bypass through the Shiradi Ghats. The state government subsequently allocated funds to maintain road accessibility during the monsoon season.
