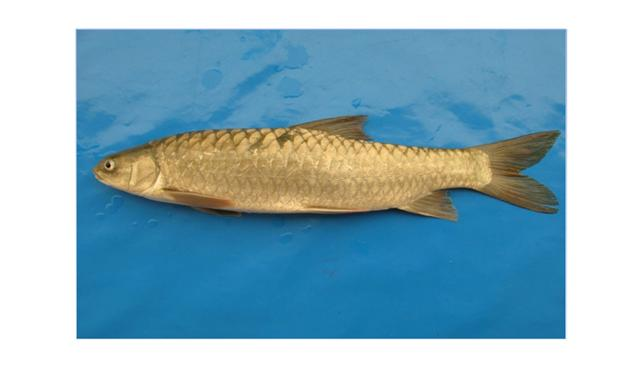

Conservation status
- Vulnerable (IUCN 3.1)

Scientific classification
- Kingdom: Animalia
- Phylum: Chordata
- Class: Actinopterygii
- Order: Cypriniformes
- Family: Cyprinidae
- Subfamily: Torinae
- Genus: Mesopotamichthys; M. S. Karaman (sr), 1971
- Species: M. sharpeyi

Binomial name
- Mesopotamichthys sharpeyi (Günther, 1874)

Synonyms
- Barbus sharpeyi Günther, 1874; Barbus faoensis Günther, 1896

= Binni =

Species of fish

The binni (Mesopotamichthys sharpeyi) is a species of cyprinid fish endemic to the Tigris–Euphrates Basin in the Middle East. This fish mostly inhabits lakes and marshes, especially in densely vegetated places where it also lays its eggs, but periodically it moves into rivers. This barbel is the only member in its genus, but was included in the "wastebasket genus" Barbus by earlier authors. It has declined in recent times due to habitat loss and overfishing.

The binni is an elongate fish but is deep-bodied for a barbel. It is overall brownish–golden with a lighter belly and darker fins. It can reach up to 56 cm (22 in) in total length, and 4 kg (8.8 lb) in weight. The sexes are similar, but females reach a larger size. The sex ratio tends to be skewed with more males than females. Maturity is reached when the species is two to four years old, and the species can reach an age of up to nine years. It feeds almost entirely on plants, ranging from phytoplankton and algae to higher plants. Although the remains of tiny animals have been found in their stomachs, these are probably ingested by mistake when feeding on plants.

Known in the local Iraqi Arabic dialect as binni or bunni, this fish is valued highly by the Marsh Arabs. Their fishermen traditionally employ an unusual technique of spearfishing from a line of boats or poison-fishing with flour or dung laced with toxic Digitalis or Datura; until recently net-fishing was mostly restricted to the Berbera tribe and held in low esteem. Since the 1960s however, large-scale fisheries have also been developed; once of prime importance throughout Iraq, the marshland fish stocks presumably declined notably following the draining of the Mesopotamian Marshes.

Umm al Binni Lake in Maysan Governorate, Iraq, was named after this species. Now mostly dried-up following the draining of the Central Marshes, its name attests to the former abundance of this fish and possible use as spawning ground (Umm is Arabic for "mother", but does not necessarily imply procreation). The lake is of interest as a possible impact crater mentioned in the Epic of Gilgamesh.
