= Acapoeta =

Conservation status
- Least Concern (IUCN 3.1)

Scientific classification
- Kingdom: Animalia
- Phylum: Chordata
- Class: Actinopterygii
- Order: Cypriniformes
- Family: Cyprinidae
- Subfamily: Torinae
- Genus: Acapoeta; Cockerell, 1910
- Species: A. tanganica

Binomial name
- Acapoeta tanganica (Boulenger, 1900)

Synonyms
- Capoeta tanganicae Boulenger, 1900; Varicorhinus tanganicae (Boulenger, 1900)

Genus of fishes

Acapoeta tanganicae, or the mbaraga, is a species of ray-finned fish in the family Cyprinidae. The genus Acopoeta is monotypic and is currently classified in the subfamily Torinae within the Cyprinidae.

Acapoeta tanganicae is endemic to Lake Tanganyika and the Rusizi River and occurs in Burundi, Democratic Republic of the Congo, Tanzania, and Zambia. In 2012, this species was caught in the Lake Rukwa catchment, and it has been suggested that this is indicative that the catchments of Lake Tanganyika and Lake Rukwa were connected at some point in the past. It was considered that the most parsimonious explanation for its presence was that its low abundance meant it had been previously overlooked as a member of the Lake Rukwa ichthyofauna rather than deliberate introduction.

Its natural habitats are rivers, freshwater lakes, and inland deltas over rock substrates. It feeds on aufwuchs as well as a variety of food collected from rocky river or lake beds including insects, ostracods, diatoms and worms.

It is threatened by habitat loss caused by increased turbidity of the water due to deforestation increasing sediment runoff in the catchments of the lake's tributary rivers. Overfishing may also be a threat, although the species is still common and can be present in large shoals, and there is no data to support a decline in the stock.

It can grow up to 60 centimetres (24 in) in total length. This species is distinguished from similar species of African cyprinids by having a horny rim to its lower lip and a larger number of lateral line scales, Acapoeta having 62–72 lateral line scales compared to 21–44 in Labeobarbus species.
