= Sanagia =

Conservation status
- Near Threatened (IUCN 3.1)

Scientific classification
- Kingdom: Animalia
- Phylum: Chordata
- Class: Actinopterygii
- Order: Cypriniformes
- Family: Cyprinidae
- Subfamily: Torinae
- Genus: Sanagia; Holly, 1926
- Species: S. velifera

Binomial name
- Sanagia velifera Holly, 1926

Synonyms
- Varicorhinus velifera (Holly, 1926)

Species of fish

Sanagia is a monospecific genus of freshwater ray-finned fish belonging to the family Cyprinidae, the family which includes the carps, barbs and related fishes. The only species in the genus is Sanagia velifera which is endemic to the Sanaga River in Cameroon. It is threatened by pollution of the Sanaga River by sewage and by the construction of an oil pipeline along the course of the river.
