= Shishila =

- Village
- Shishila Village in Karnataka, India
- Coordinates: 12°54′49″N 75°30′14″E
- Country: India
- State: Karnataka
- Talukas: Belthangady

Government
  - Body: Panchayath

Population (2011)
  - Total: 2,090
- Time zone: UTC+5:30 (IST)
- PIN: 574198

Shishila is a village located at the base of Western Ghats in Belthangady taluk, Dakshina Kannada district of the Karnataka State, India. The main attraction of the village is a temple dedicated to Lord Shishileshwara.

== Background ==
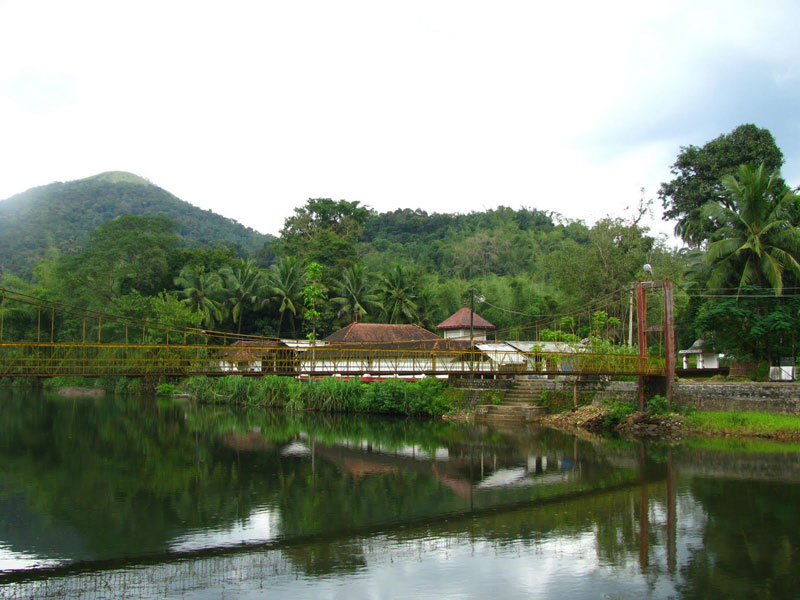
Panoramic view of Shishileshwara temple on the banks of river Kapila.

The Shishileshwara temple is situated on the banks of the river Kapila. The fishes in the river are regarded sacred by the villagers and are fed with beaten rice and puffed rice as an offering. Locally, the place is also known by the name ‘Matsya Theertha'. Fishing around the temple premises was banned by the Mr. Cotchman in the year 1930, the then British collector of the district. On the morning of 25 th May 1996, thousands of fishes met their end as the miscreants poisoned the river. A memorial carved in stone stands beside the temple as a reminder to the tragic poisoning of the fishes. Shaken by the tragedy, the villagers established Matsya Hitarkashana Vedike, a forum for the protection of the sacred fishes. Today, Shishila temple fish sanctuary is one of the finest fish sanctuaries in the country accommodating about 40 species of fishes. Shishila is one of the very few places in India, outside of wild life sanctuaries and national parks, where the huge Mahseer fishes, of a size to be rarely seen today anywhere else in India, enjoy great amount of protection.

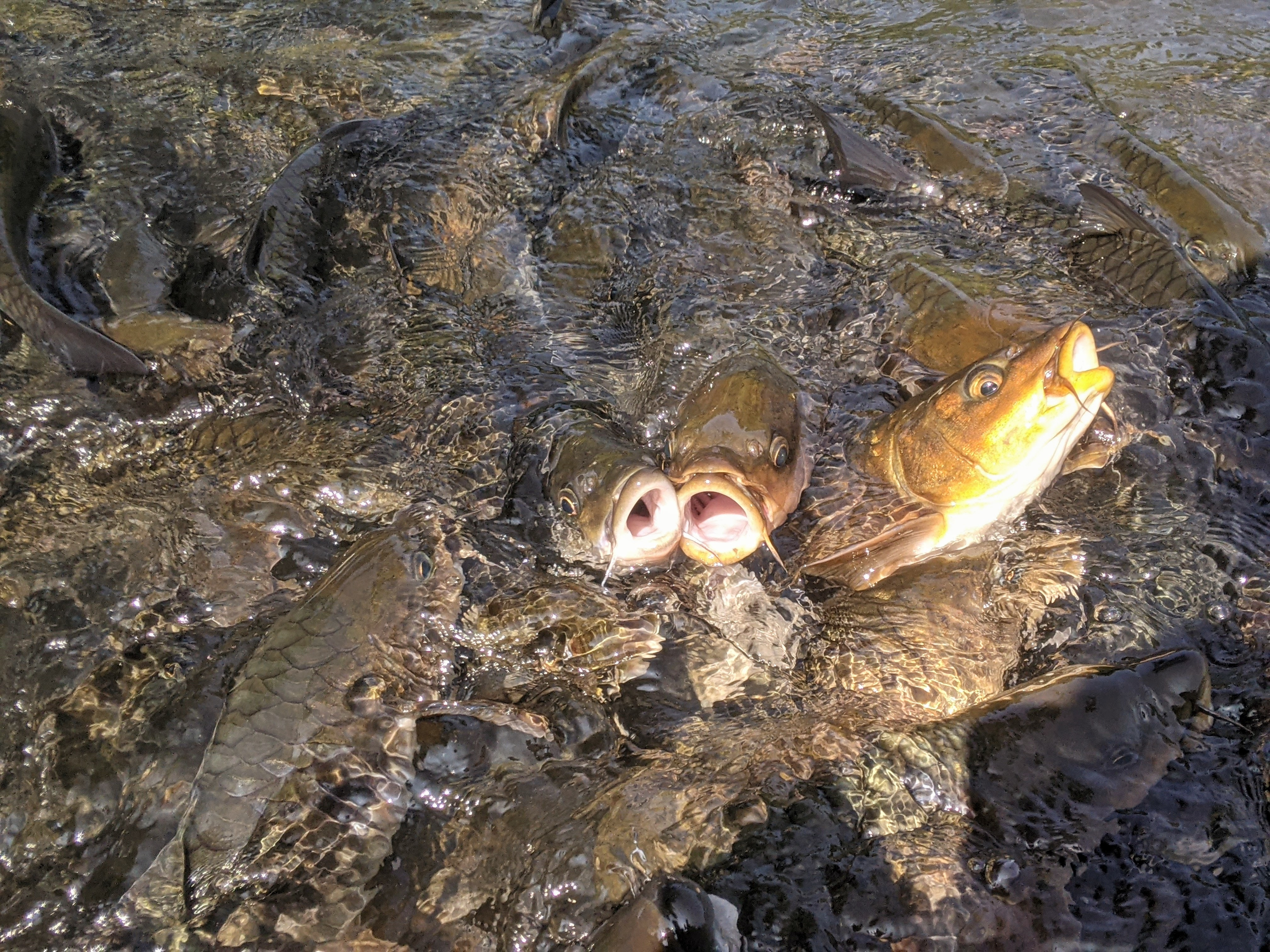
Fishes congregating to feed on puffed rice in Shishila.

== Demographics ==
As per Population Census of India 2011, Shishila village has population of 2090 of which 1039 are males while 1051 are females. The population of children with age 0-6 is 189 which makes up 9.04% of total population of village. Average Sex Ratio of Shishila village is 1012 females per 1000 males, which is higher than Karnataka state average of 973. Child Sex Ratio for the Shishila as per census is 817, lower than Karnataka average of 948.

=== Religion ===
Inhabitants of Shishila follow either of the three religions: Hinduism, Islam or Christianity. The Hindu population is mainly made up of tribal people belonging to the communities of Mogera, Nalike, Malekudiya, Gouda, Marati Naiks and Billavas. Brahmins of Chithpavana, Havyaka and Shivalli sects are also present.

== Education ==
Shishila village has higher literacy rate compared to Karnataka. In 2011, literacy rate of Shishila village was 83.06% compared to 75.36% of Karnataka. In Shishila Male literacy stands at 90.59% while female literacy rate was 75.78%.

List of educational facilities in Shishila:

- Government Higher Primary School, Shishila
- Ashrama School, Shishila
- Government PU College and High School, Arsainamakki. It is located approximately 8 km from Shishila.

== Agriculture ==
The main crops of Shishila village are paddy, coconut, areca nut, jasmine, black pepper, rubber and cocoa. Paddy is generally cultivated during three seasons in a year, Karthika or Yenel (May–October), Suggi (October to January) and Kolake (January to April). There are some farmers who do dairy farming, poultry etc. for their livelihood.

== Transport ==
=== Air ===
The nearest airport to Shishila is Mangalore International Airport which is at a distance of 92 km. Flights are available to major Indian cities like Delhi, Bangalore, Hyderabad, Chennai, Mumbai and Middle East countries like Abu Dhabi, Bahrain, Dammam, Doha, Dubai–International, Kuwait, Muscat.

=== Railway ===
Mangalore Central Railway Station is the nearest railway junction to Shishila, situated at a distance of about 86 km. The railway station is well connected to all the major cities and towns in India. The nearest railway station is Subrahmanya Road Railway Station (Station Code:SBHR) which is around 40 km via the fastest road.

=== Road ===
Shishila is well connected to nearest towns like Mangalore, Puttur, Madikeri, Subramanya, Dharmastala and Kasaragod by road. From Dharmastala or Uppinangady, one has to take the bus to Shishila and can get down near the temple. There are limited number of buses to Shishila due to which the residents face difficulties in reaching the district centre Mangaluru. The alternative way is to travel to Kokkada and take a jeep or auto towards Shishila.

== Activities ==
The towering peaks of Western Ghats along with a quietly flowing river Kapila makes Shishila is a great place to unwind. For the adventure seekers, the village serves as a base for treks like Amedikallu peak, Ombattu gudda and Ettina Bhuja peaks in the Charmadi ranges of the Western Ghats. Prior permission from the forest department is mandatory for all the treks starting from Shishila. The Shishileshwara temple premises is also a birder’s paradise, offering views of over 94 species of birds.

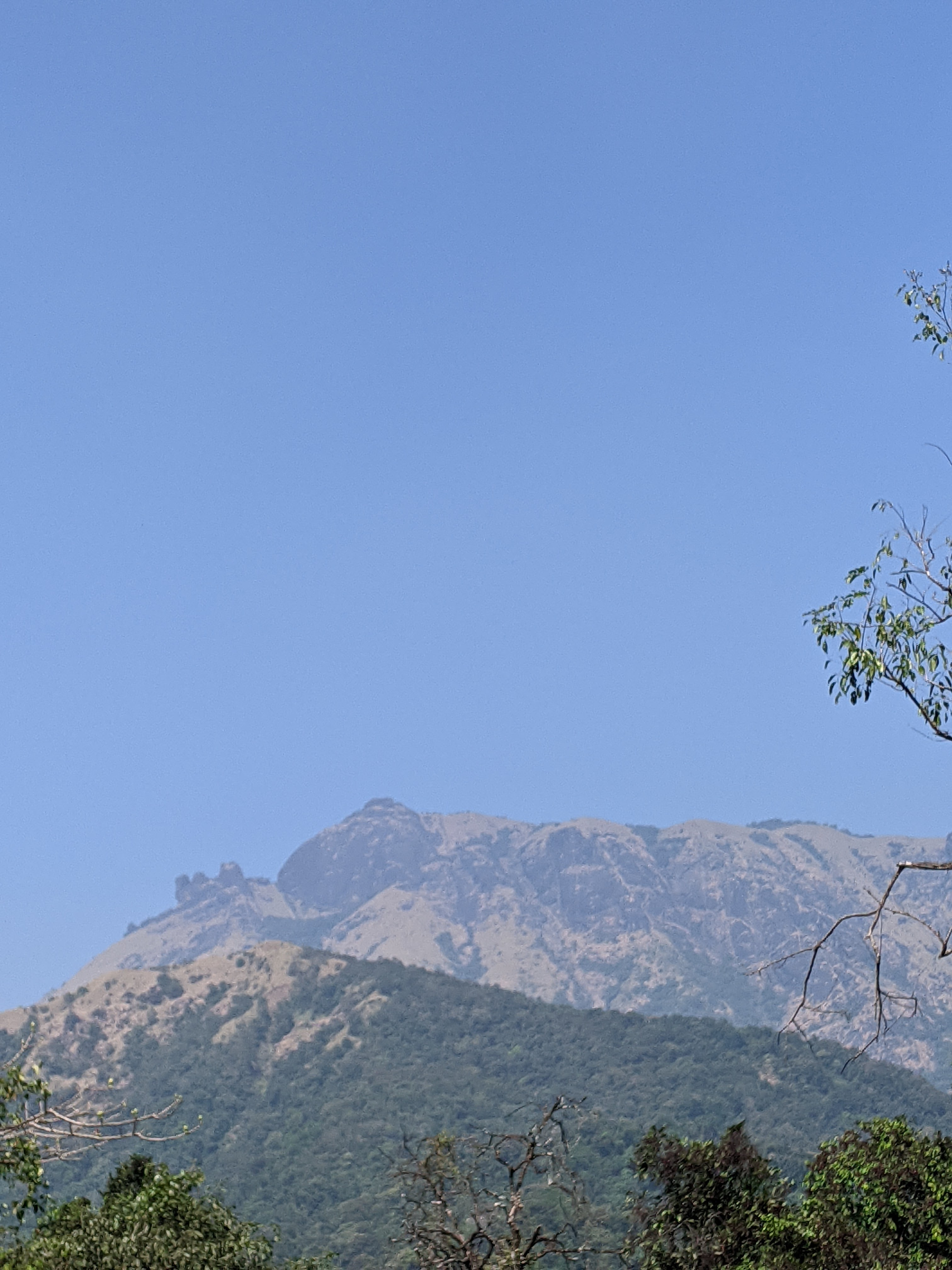
Amedikallu peak as seen from Shishila

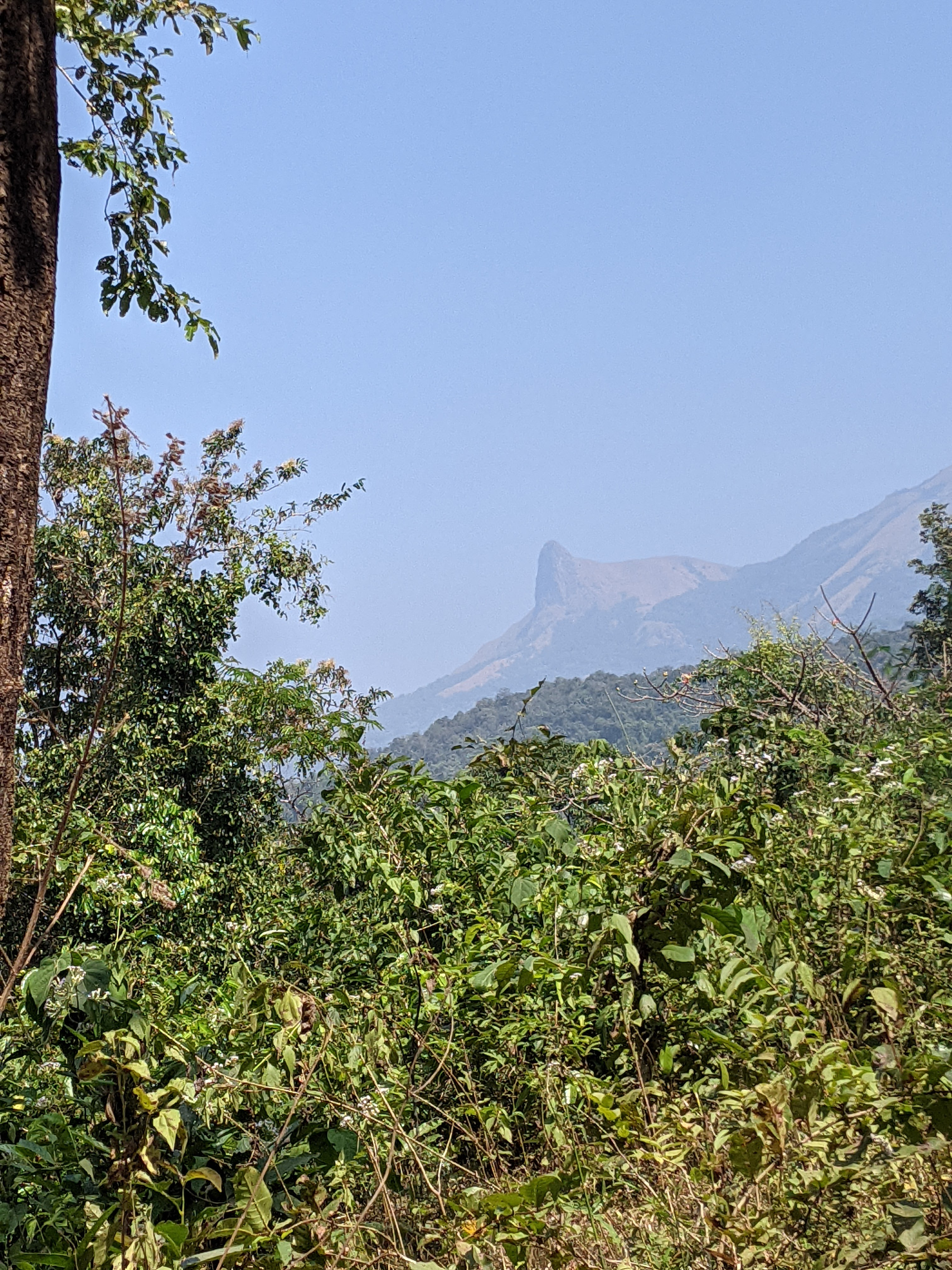
Yettina Bhuja peak as seen from Shishila
