= Lepidopygopsis =

Conservation status
- Endangered (IUCN 3.1)

Scientific classification
- Kingdom: Animalia
- Phylum: Chordata
- Class: Actinopterygii
- Order: Cypriniformes
- Family: Cyprinidae
- Subfamily: Torinae
- Genus: Lepidopygopsis; B. S. Raj, 1941
- Species: L. typus

Binomial name
- Lepidopygopsis typus B. S. Raj, 1941

Monotypic genus of fish

Lepidopygopsis is a monospecific genus of freshwater ray-finned fish belonging to the family Cyprinidae, which includes the carps, barbs and related fishes. The only species in the genus is the peninsular hill trout (Lepidopygopsis typus), a species endemic to India, where it is restricted to the Periyar River and lake system in Kerala.

The International Union for Conservation of Nature classifies this as an endangered species, stating that it is threatened by invasive fish species, pollution and a dam.
