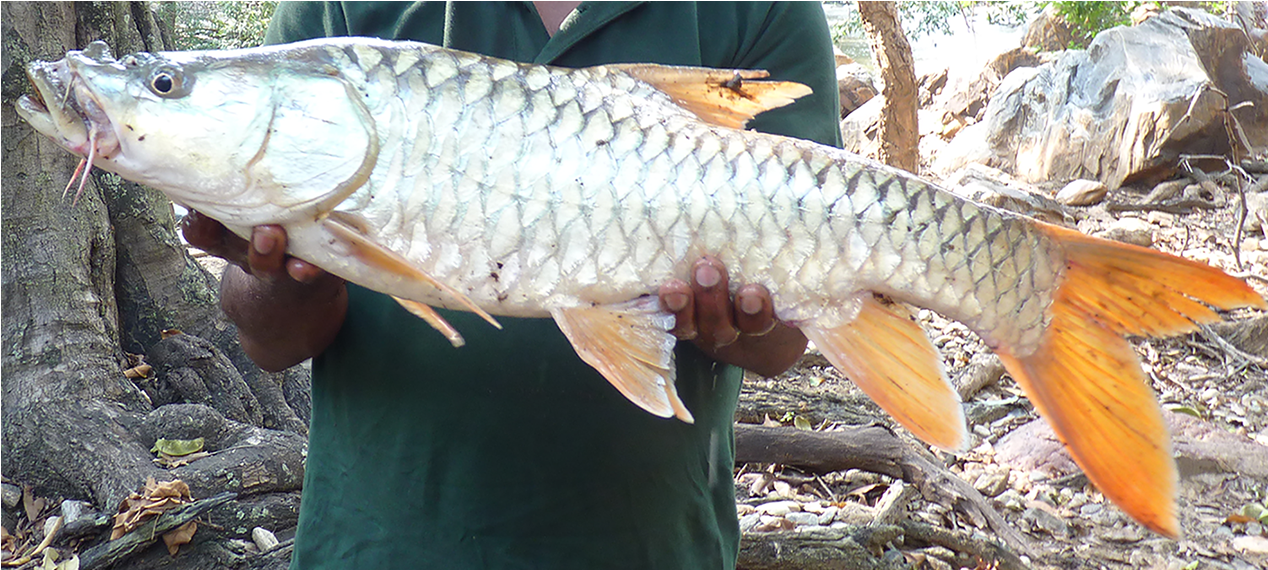

Conservation status
- Critically Endangered (IUCN 3.1)

Scientific classification
- Kingdom: Animalia
- Phylum: Chordata
- Class: Actinopterygii
- Order: Cypriniformes
- Family: Cyprinidae
- Genus: Tor
- Species: T. remadeviae

Binomial name
- Tor remadeviae Kurup & Radhakrishnan, 2007

Synonyms
- Tor remadevii Kurup & Radhakrishnan, 2011

= Tor remadeviae =

Orange-finned mahseer

Species of fish

Tor remadeviae, the orange-finned mahseer, also known as the hump-backed mahseer, is a critically endangered species of freshwater fish endemic to the Western Ghats of India. It is restricted to the Kaveri river basin.

It can be distinguished from other mahseer by the prominent hump originating above the pre-opercle, a distinctive kink in the pre-opercule, a terminal mouth position, and its bright orange caudal fin. It is considered a high-quality game fish, and has been proclaimed by anglers as "the largest and hardest fighting freshwater fish in the world".

== Conservation issues ==
Among the reasons for the species' extreme threat status is the introduction of non-native mahseers Tor khudree and Himalayan golden mahseer (Tor putitora) to the wider Kaveri river basin. Also endangering this species is the heavy construction of dams along the Kaveri and tributaries, as well as the use of dynamite fishing. These and other factors including loss of riparian cover, industrial and urban pollutions, irrigation and abstraction, plus climatic changes in monsoon weather patterns led to a heavy crash in hump-backed mahseer populations around 2004.
Despite this endangered status, the general lack of a formal scientific name had previously hampered efforts to protect the species. However, a 2018 study found that the orange-finned mahseer was in fact conspecific with Tor remadeviae, a little-known species identified in 2007 based on 19 individuals sampled from the Pambar River in 2004. This has allowed the species as known from historic records across the whole river basin to finally gain a scientific name and an updated Red Listing. These will both be of help for future conservation efforts.

== Gallery ==
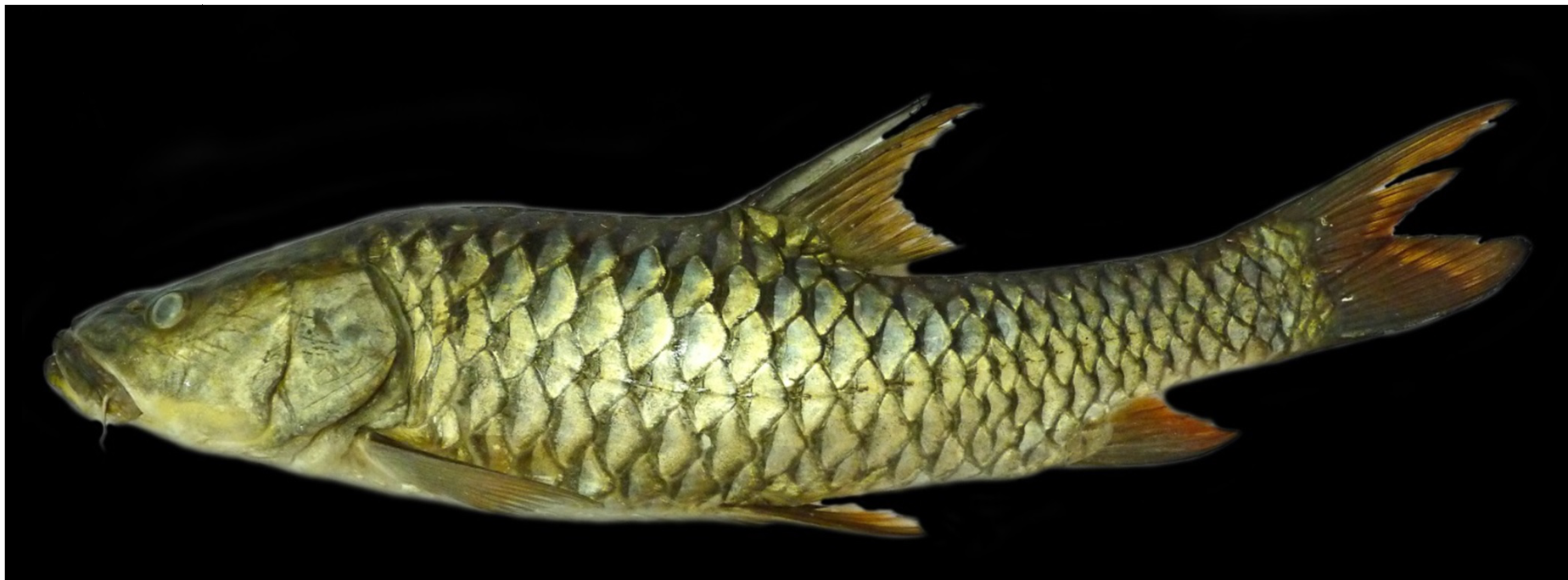
Preserved specimen.

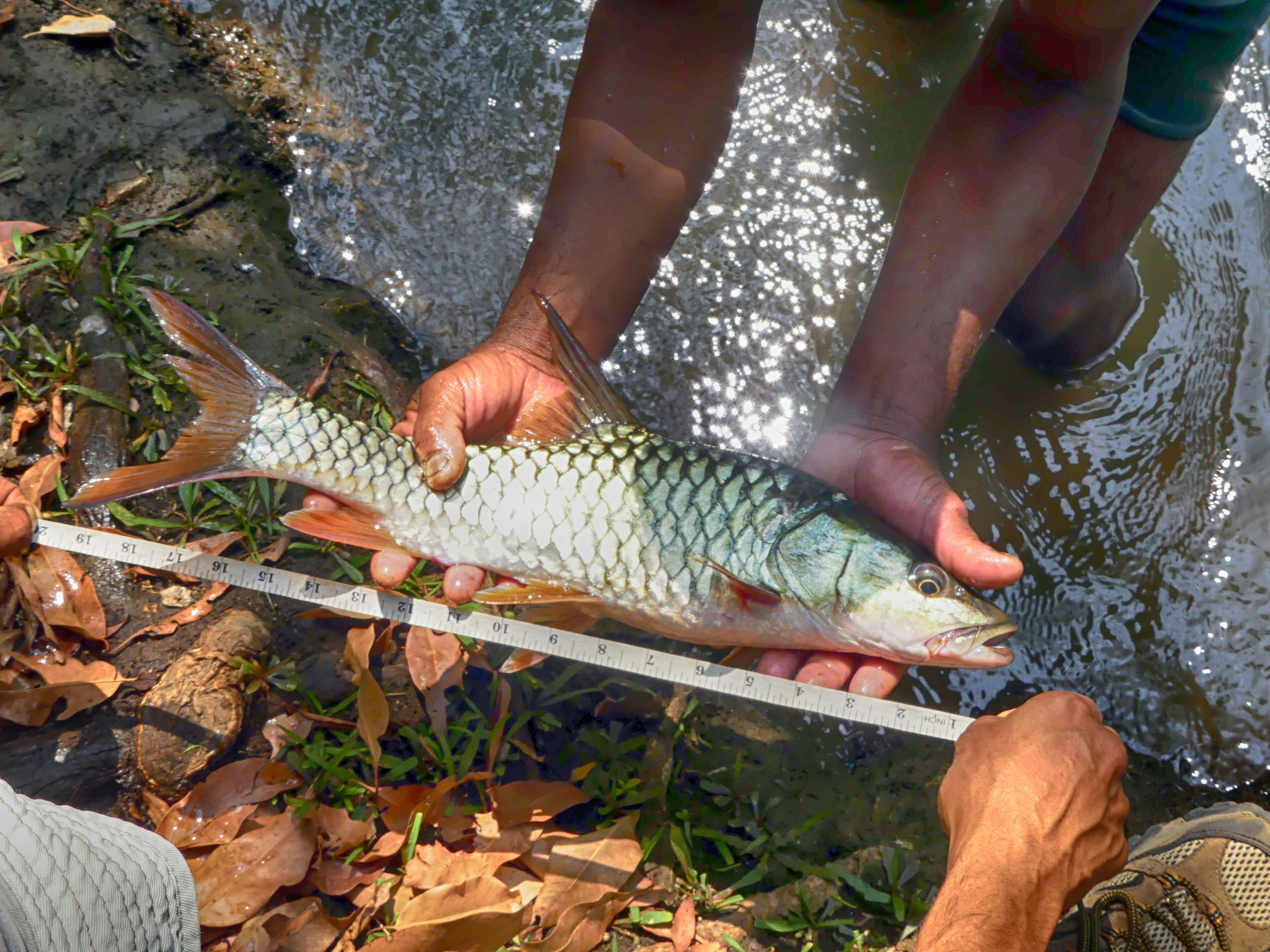
Young individual caught during 2016 survey of Moyar River.

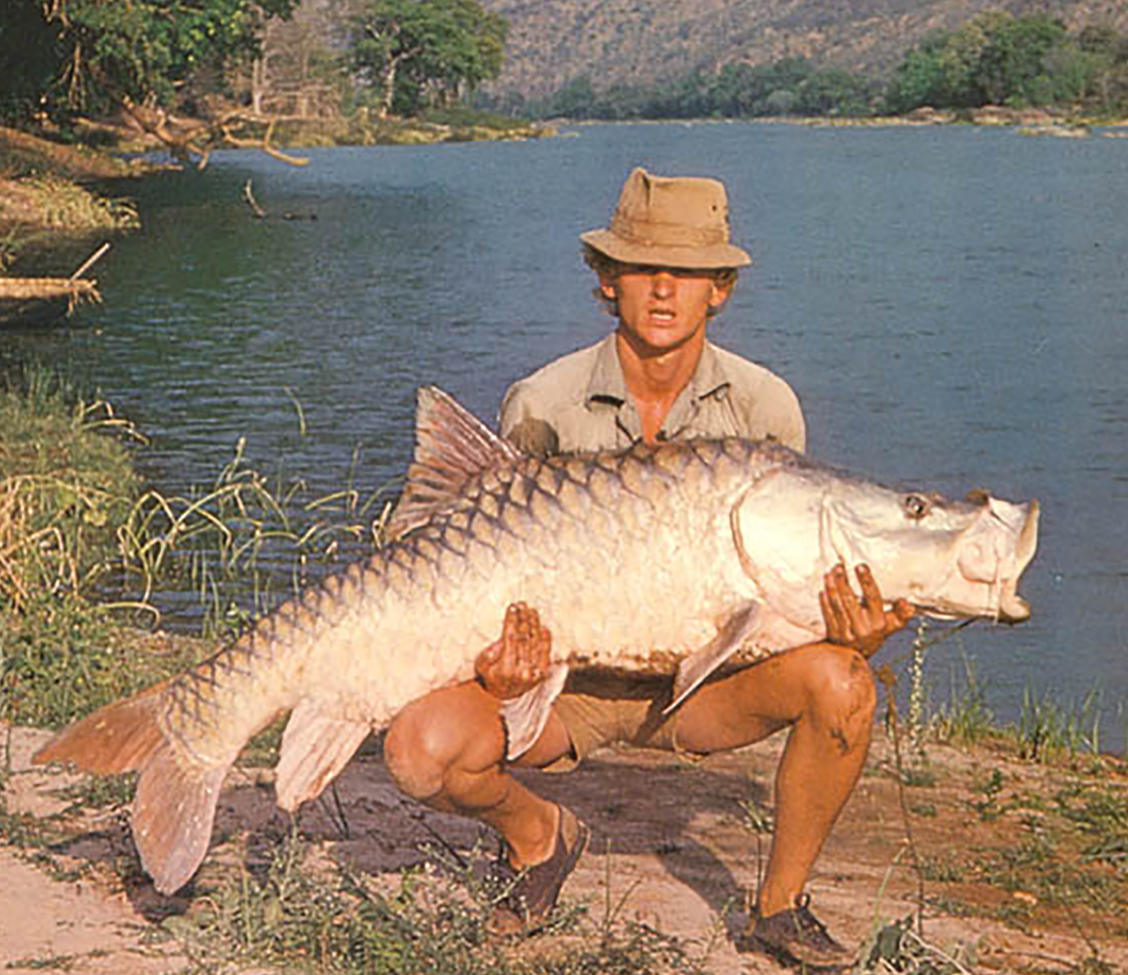
Very large individual caught in Cauvery by Martin Clark, 1978
