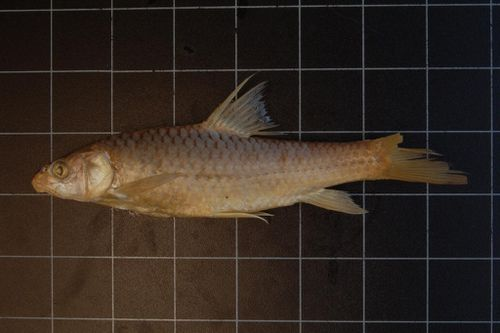

Conservation status
- Extinct (yes) (IUCN 3.1)

Scientific classification
- Kingdom: Animalia
- Phylum: Chordata
- Class: Actinopterygii
- Order: Cypriniformes
- Family: Cyprinidae
- Subfamily: Torinae
- Genus: †Atlantor; Borkenhagen & Freyhof, 2023
- Species: †A. reinii

Binomial name
- †Atlantor reinii (Günther, 1874)

Synonyms
- Barbus reinii Günther, 1874; Tor reinii (Günther, 1874); Labeobarbus reinii (Günther, 1874)

= Giant Atlas barbel =

Species of fish

The giant Atlas barbel (Atlantor reinii) was a ray-finned fish species in the family Cyprinidae. It was the only species in the genus Atlantor but it is now thought to be extinct.

It was previously considered to be fairly close to the core group around the typical barbels (Barbus, Luciobarbus and Messinobarbus). It was also thought to be closer still to Carasobarbus and the yellowfish (Labeobarbus), and to be either a lineage of the former, or part of a distinct genus, or included in the latter (maybe together with the former). Initially classified in the genus Barbus, it was transferred to the genus Labeobarbus in 2010. However, in 2023 this taxon was reclassified in the monospecific genus Atlantor within the subfamily Torinae. The specific name honours the geographer, author and traveler Johannes Justus Rein (1835-1918), who, with Karl von Fritsch, collected the type from the Tensift River in Morocco.

It was endemic to Morocco, where its natural habitats were the Kasab and Tensift Rivers. The species was once plentiful, water pollution (particularly with domestic waste) and unsustainable water extraction (particularly for irrigation agriculture) have caused it to suffer declines, and was last seen in 2001. It was reclassified as extinct by the IUCN in 2022.
