= Neolissochilus benasi =

Conservation status
- Data Deficient (IUCN 3.1)

Scientific classification
- Kingdom: Animalia
- Phylum: Chordata
- Class: Actinopterygii
- Division: Teleostei
- Order: Cypriniformes
- Family: Cyprinidae
- Genus: Neolissochilus
- Species: N. benasi

Binomial name
- Neolissochilus benasi (Pellegrin & Chevey, 1936)

Synonyms
- Barbodes benasi (Pellegrin & Chevey, 1936); Crossocheilus benasi Pellegrin & Chevey, 1936; Crossocheilus benasi vuha Nguyen, Nguyen & Le, 1999

Species of fish

Neolissochilus benasi is a species of freshwater ray-finned fish belonging to the family Cyprinidae, the family which includes the carps, barbs and related fishes. This species is found in mountain streams and rivers in the bason of the Trà Khúc River in Quảng Ngãi province in Viet Nam and the Red River basin in Yunnan and northern Viet Nam. This species has a maximum published standard length of 17.4 cm (6.9 in)>

The species has consistently been found to be basal to both the rest of Neolissochilus and Tor, thus "N." benasi could be moved to a new genus.
