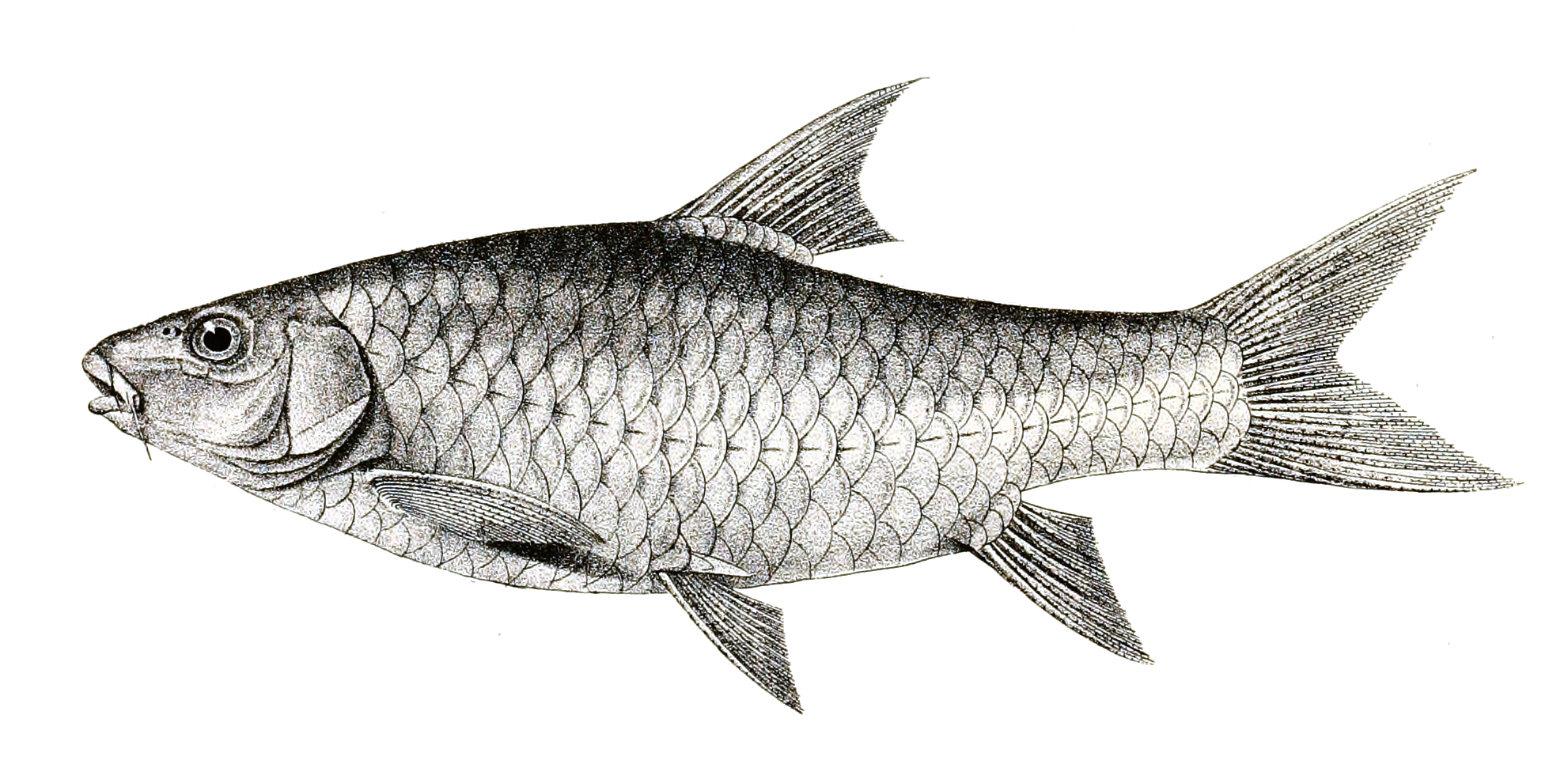
- Adult
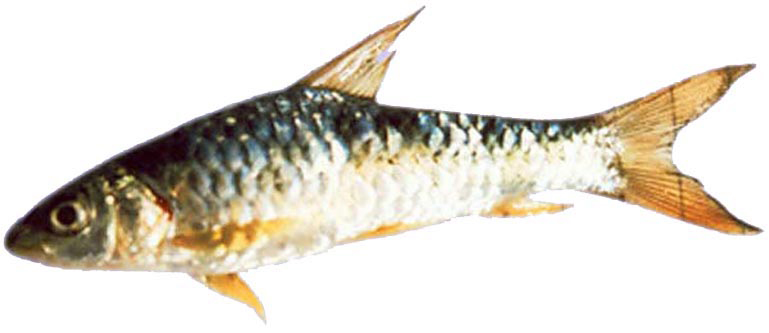
- Juvenile

Conservation status
- Least Concern (IUCN 3.1)

Scientific classification
- Kingdom: Animalia
- Phylum: Chordata
- Class: Actinopterygii
- Order: Cypriniformes
- Family: Cyprinidae
- Genus: Tor
- Species: T. khudree

Binomial name
- Tor khudree (Sykes, 1839)

Synonyms
- Barbus khudree Sykes, 1839; Puntius khudree (Sykes, 1839); Barbus longispinis Günther, 1868; Puntius khudree (Sykes, 1839); Tor khudree longispinnis (Günther, 1868); Barbus neilli Day, 1869

= Tor khudree =

Species of fish

Tor khudree, the Deccan mahseer, Khudree mahseer, or black mahseer, is a freshwater fish of the carp family found in major rivers and reservoirs of India and Sri Lanka. Found throughout India, following large-scale introductions of artificially-bred fish across the country (annex 2), but found of the largest size and in the greatest abundance in mountain or rocky streams.
The fish as originally described by Sykes in his November 1838 paper 'On the Fishes of the Dukhun' as Barbus khudree, is a silvery-bluish coloured fish, with blood red fins or fins tipped with a bluish tinge. The type locality is the Mula-Mutha River close to the Indian city of Pune, a part of the Krishna River basin.
Although there have been efforts to artificially breed this mahseer since the early1970's, there is no way to determine if these fish are Tor khudree, as the populations within the type locality have gone extinct.

It has been reported that the fish moves to upper reaches of small streams to spawn, which is a common spawning strategy of mahseer. They feed on plants, fruits, insects, shrimps and molluscs and may be grown in ponds. They are predatory, and even prey on smaller mahseer. While large fish of over a metre and 45 kg in weight have been recorded, such sizes are no longer found in the type locality. In the River Cauvery, fish to over 30 kg are being caught in recent years.

== Description ==
The lips are thick, with an uninterrupted fold across the lower jaw, and with both the upper and lower lips in some specimens produced in the mesial line. The maxillary pair of barbels are longer than the rostral, and extending to below the last third of the eye. Fins the dorsal arises opposite the ventral, and is three fourths as high as the body; its last undivided ray is smooth, osseous, strong, and of varying length and thickness. Himalayan, Bengal, and Central Indian specimens generally have the spine strong, and from one half to two thirds the length of the head, it rarely exceeds this extent. In Canara, Malabar, and Southern India, where the lips are largely developed, the spine is very much stronger and as long as the head excluding the snout. Pectoral as long as the head excluding the snout; it reaches the ventral, which is little shorter. Anal laid flat does not reach the base of the caudal, which is deeply forked. Lateral line complete, 2 to 2.5 rows of scales between it and the base of the ventral fin; 9 rows before the dorsal. Colour silvery or greenish along the upper half of the body, becoming silvery shot with gold on the sides and beneath. Lower fins reddish yellow.

These two fish (photo, right) from brood stock of Tor khudree sampled at Karnataka state fishery department hatchery at Harangi reservoir demonstrate the difficulties of making correct identifications. One is a slim-bodied fish with a more golden body and orange-coloured fins, the other is deep-bodied with a silver-grey body colouration and blue fins. Both are genetically identical to the stocks known as Tor khudree sourced from the Tata Power hatchery at Lonavla, Maharastra.

== Status ==
=== Conservation ===
T. khudree has also been recently reported as one of the winter exclusive fishes in the Chambal river basin of Central India (Madhya Pradesh). Ranching and creation of a winter-time freshwater protected area have been recommended at Ghatbilod (Indore, Madhya Pradesh) dedicated for conservation of this Mahseer species.

== Record catches ==
H. S. Thomas in his Rod in India quotes a note by G. P. Sanderson:

As to my big fish I put it down at 150 lbs., the other 50 have been added in the telling. I had no means of weighing it but I found it was as much as I could lift a couple of inches from the ground by hugging it in my arms; no one but a big Mussulman peon in camp could do as much as this. I imagine that a man of 11 stone should have no difficulty in lifting a man of his own weight off the ground if lying on his back; I have since lifted a man of over 10 stone with greater ease than the fish. A native overseer with me, who was formerly in the Ashtagram Sugar Works, put it down at 5 maunds (or 140 Lbs. Mysore); he said they were accustomed to deal with 5 maund bags, and he knew the feel of them pretty well. The measurements of the fish were : length, including tail, 60 inches; greatest girth 38 inches; inside lips when open, circumference 24 inches. The skin and head are in the Bangalore Museum." Of course my rough estimate of the fish's weight is valueless as fact, but you may believe that I was not out many pounds. It was an astonishingly thick and heavy fish for its short length. I have caught them 5 ft. 6 in., but not much more than 80 lbs. It had a shoulder like a bullock, steeply hanging over. I have caught about fifty of them, but my next largest was about 90 lbs. I have no doubt in my own mind that they run over 200 or 250 lbs., as I have seen teeth and bones of them far larger than my 150-pounder; they are often caught by the natives.

Note: the head and skin of this fish were moved from Bangalore Museum and are now held in the Regional Museum of Natural History Mysore. A research visit by a team from Mahseer Trust determined, through taxonomic investigation, that this fish was clearly an endemic Tor remadevii, not an introduced Tor khudree.
