= Western Ghats =

Mountain range along the western coast of India

- Sahyadri
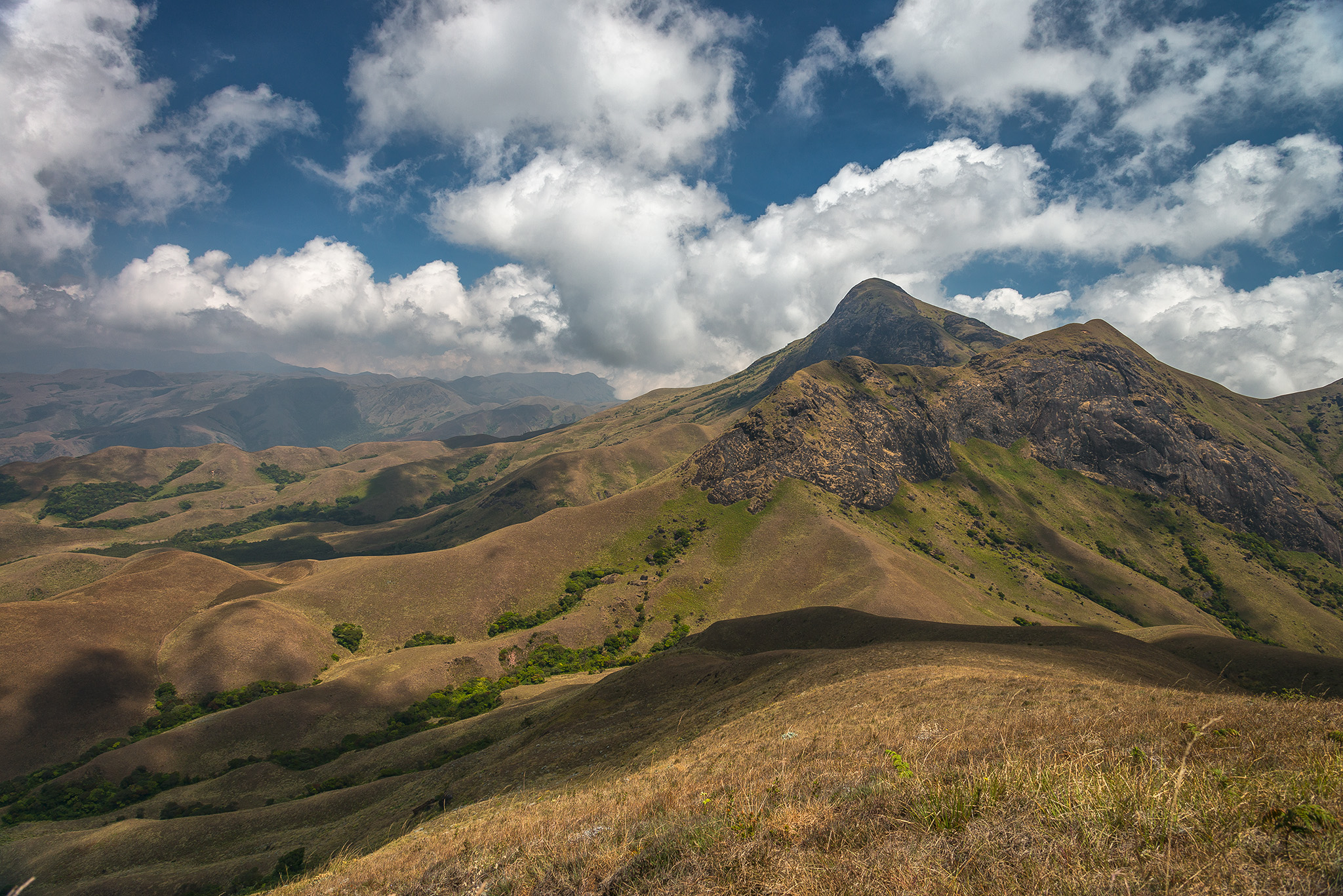
- Anamudi, the highest peak in the Western Ghats

Highest point
- Peak: Anamudi, Eravikulam National Park
- Elevation: 2,695 m (8,842 ft)
- Coordinates: 10°10′11″N 77°03′40″E

Dimensions
- Length: 1,600 km (990 mi) N–S
- Width: 100 km (62 mi) E–W
- Area: 160,000 km^{2} (62,000 mi^{2})

Geography
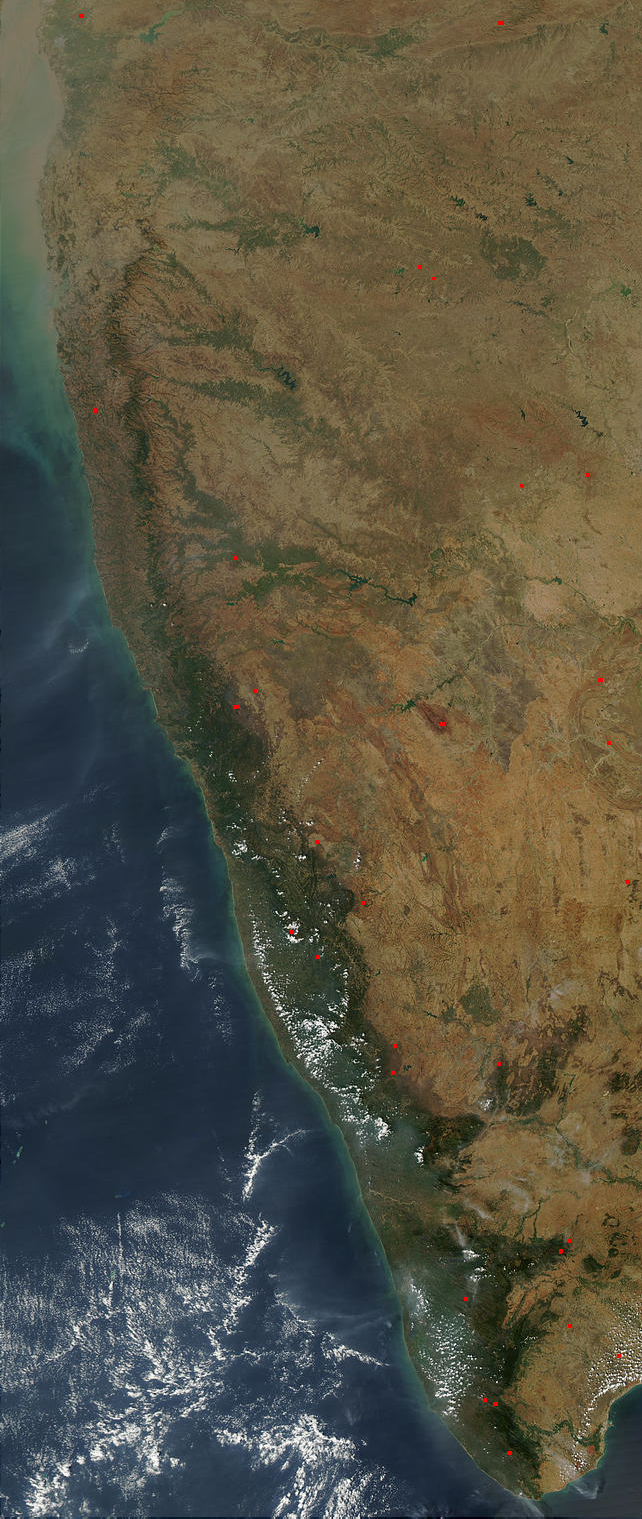
- Satellite imagery showing the Western Ghats running parallel to the west coast of India
- Country: India
- Regions: Western and Southern India
- States: Gujarat; Maharashtra; Goa; Karnataka; Kerala; Tamil Nadu
- Biome: Tropical rainforests; Marsh

Geology
- Rock age: Cenozoic
- Rock types: Basalt; Laterite; Limestone

UNESCO World Heritage Site
- Criteria: Natural: ix, x
- Reference: 1342
- Inscription: 2012 (36th Session)
- Area: 795,315 ha (1,965,270 acres)

The Western Ghats, also known as the Sahyadri, is a mountain range that stretches 1,600 km (990 mi) along the west coast of India. Covering an area of 160,000 km^{2} (62,000 sq mi), it traverses the Indian states of Gujarat, Maharashtra, Goa, Karnataka, Kerala, and Tamil Nadu. The range forms an almost continuous chain of mountains along the western edge of the Deccan Plateau from the Tapti River to Swamithoppe in Kanyakumari district at the southern tip of the Indian peninsula. The Western Ghats meet with the Eastern Ghats at Nilgiris before continuing south.

Geologic evidence indicates that the mountains were formed during the break-up of the supercontinent of Gondwana. The mountains arose along the west coast of India somewhere in the Late Jurassic and Early Cretaceous periods when India separated from the African continent. The mountains are roughly divided into three parts: the northern section with an elevation ranging from 900 to 1,500 m (3,000 to 4,900 ft), the middle section starting south of Goa with a lower elevation of less than 900 m (3,000 ft), and the southern section where the elevation rises again. The Western Ghats have several peaks above 2,000 m (6,600 ft), with Anamudi being the highest at 2,695 m (8,842 ft). The average elevation is around 1,200 m (3,900 ft).

The Western Ghats form one of the major drainage basins of India, feeding many perennial river systems that drain almost 40% of the land area of the country. Because of the higher elevation of the Deccan Plateau on the west, most rivers flow eastwards towards the Bay of Bengal, resulting in chiselled eastern slopes and steeper western slopes facing the Arabian Sea. The Western Ghats play an important role in determining the climate and seasons in India. They block the rain-bearing monsoon winds flowing eastward from the Arabian Sea, resulting in rainfall along the western coast. By the time the air rises above the mountains it is dry, forming a rain shadow region with very little rainfall on the leeward side towards the interior of the Deccan Plateau.

The Western Ghats region is a biodiversity hotspot as it harbours a large number of species of flora and fauna, most of which are endemic to this region. The Western Ghats also influence the monsoon of South Asia, as their high montane forests and topography affect regional rainfall patterns and contribute to the ecological diversity of the Indian peninsula. At least 325 globally threatened species occur in the Western Ghats. The region was declared a UNESCO World Heritage Site in 2012.

== Etymology ==
The name Western Ghats derives from the word ghat and the cardinal direction in which it is located with respect to the Indian mainland. Ghat, a term used in the Indian subcontinent, depending on the context, could either refer to a range of stepped hills such as the Eastern Ghats and Western Ghats, or a series of steps leading down to a body of water or wharf. As per linguist Thomas Burrow, the word Ghat was derived from similar words used in various Dravidian languages such as kattu (mountain side, ridge, or dam) in Tamil, katte (dam), gatta (mountain), and gattu (bank or shore) in Kannada, and katta (dam) and gatte (shore or embankment) in Telugu. The mountain range is also known as Sahyadri, derived from Sanskrit, meaning benevolent or tolerant mountain.

== Geology ==
The Western Ghats are the mountainous, faulted, and eroded edge of the Deccan Plateau. Geologic evidence indicates that they were formed during the break-up of the super-continent of Gondwana. After the break-up, the Deccan Plateau was formed by basalt rocks, which caused the western side to rise at an elevation.

Geophysical evidence indicates that the mountains arose along the west coast of India somewhere in the late Jurassic and early Cretaceous periods when India separated from the African continent. Several faults triggered the formation of Western Ghats, then interspersed with valleys and river gorges. Because of the elevation of the Deccan Plateau on the west, most rivers flow from west to east, resulting in chiselled eastern slopes and steeper western slopes facing the sea.

== Geography ==
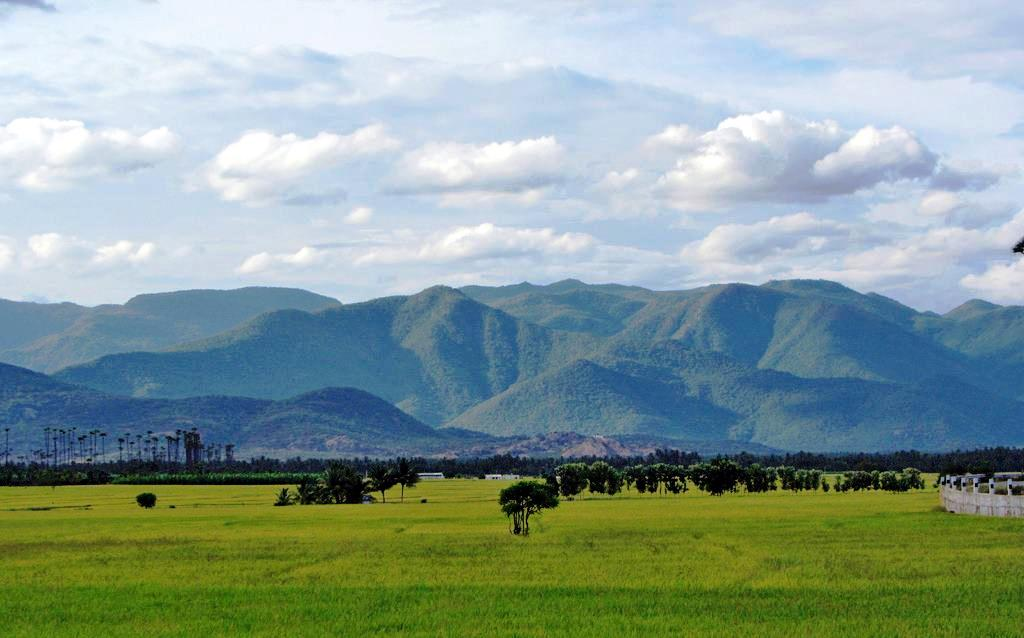
The Western Ghats form a continuous chain of mountains.

The Western Ghats extend from the Satpura Range south of the Tapti River in the north and runs approximately 1,600 km (990 mi) to the southern tip of the Indian peninsula, where it ends at the Marunthuvazh Malai at Swamithoppe in Kanyakumari district. It covers an area of 160,000 km^{2} (62,000 sq mi), traversing the Indian states of Gujarat, Maharashtra, Goa, Karnataka, Kerala, and Tamil Nadu.

=== Topography ===
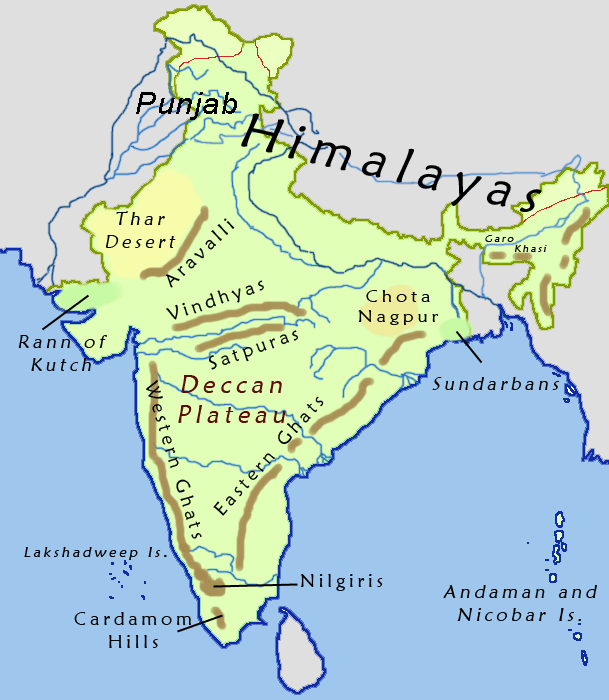
Mountain ranges of India, including the Western Ghats

The Western Ghats form an almost continuous chain of mountains running parallel to the western coast of India along the Arabian Sea. The average elevation is around 1,200 m (3,900 ft). There are three gaps in the mountain range: the northernmost Goa Gap, formed 65 to 80 million years ago, the oldest and widest Palghat Gap, formed 500 million years ago, and the southernmost narrowest Sengottai Gap. The narrow coastal plain between the Western Ghats and the Arabian Sea is known as the Western Coastal Plains.

The mountains can be roughly divided into three parts: the northern section with an elevation ranging from 900–1,500 m (3,000–4,900 ft), the middle section starting from the south of Goa with a lower elevation of less than 900 m (3,000 ft), and the southern section where the altitude rises again. The Western Ghats meet with the Eastern Ghats in the Moyar River valley in the Nilgiris before continuing south. The Western Ghats have many peaks that rise above 2,000 m (6,600 ft), with Anamudi at 2,695 m (8,842 ft) being the highest peak.

=== Hydrography ===
The Western Ghats form one of the major watersheds of India, feeding many perennial rivers. These major river systems drain almost 40% of the land area of the country. The major river systems originating in the Western Ghats are the Godavari, Kaveri, and Krishna. Most rivers flow eastwards towards the Bay of Bengal owing to the steeper gradient moving from east to west, and many smaller streams drain the region, often carrying a large volume of water during the monsoon months. The streams and rivers give rise to numerous waterfalls in the region. The rivers have been dammed for hydroelectric and irrigation purposes, with major reservoirs spread across the region.

== Climate ==
Annual rainfall

The Western Ghats play an important role in determining the climate and seasons in India. During the dry summer months of April – May, heat builds up on the land, which draws air from the sea. The air, which picks up moisture along the way and flows eastward from the Arabian Sea, is blocked by the Western Ghats. The rising air cools and brings about orographic precipitation along the western coast. This signifies the onset of the monsoon season in June. By the time the air rises above the mountains, it becomes dry, resulting in a rain shadow region with very little rainfall on the leeward side towards the interior of the Deccan plateau. The monsoon winds rounding up the peninsula and moving from the east from the Bay of Bengal pass over the Eastern Ghats and bring the majority of the rainfall to the plains up north.

Climate in the mountains shows variations with altitude across the range. Due to its physical proximity to the equator and the Arabian Sea, the region experiences a warm and humid tropical climate throughout the year. Mean temperatures range from 20 °C (68 °F) in the south to 24 °C (75 °F) in the north. Subtropical or temperate climates, and occasional near-zero temperatures during winter are experienced in regions with higher elevations. The coldest period in the region is the wettest monsoon period in the southern part of the mountain range. Annual rainfall in this region averages 100 cm (39 in) to 900 cm (350 in), with an average rainfall of 250 cm (98 in). The total amount of rain does not depend on the spread of the area; areas in northern Maharashtra receive heavy rainfall followed by long dry spells, while regions closer to the equator receive lower annual rainfall and have rain spells lasting several months in a year.

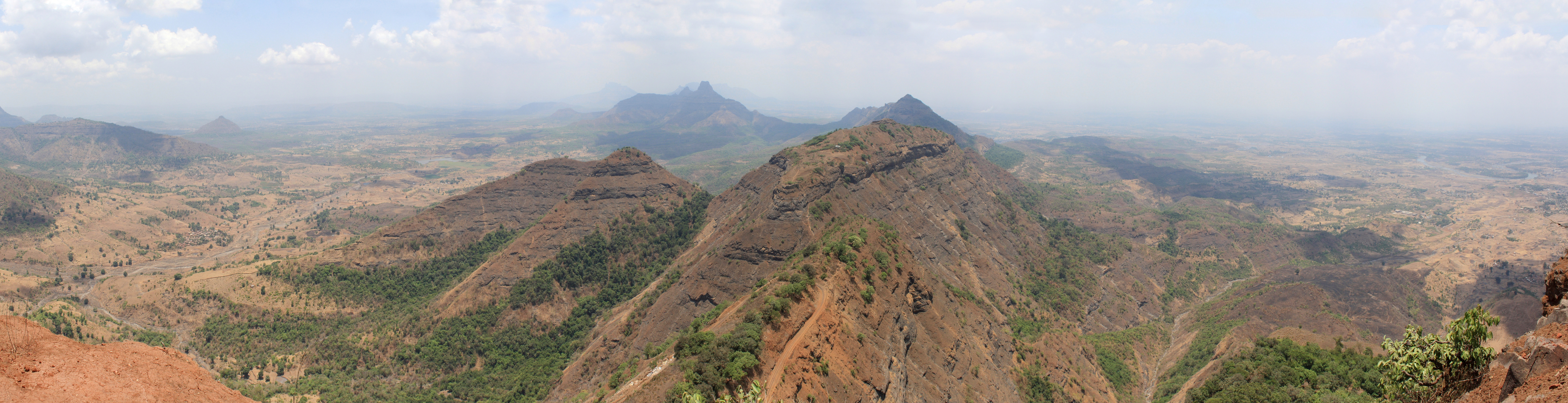
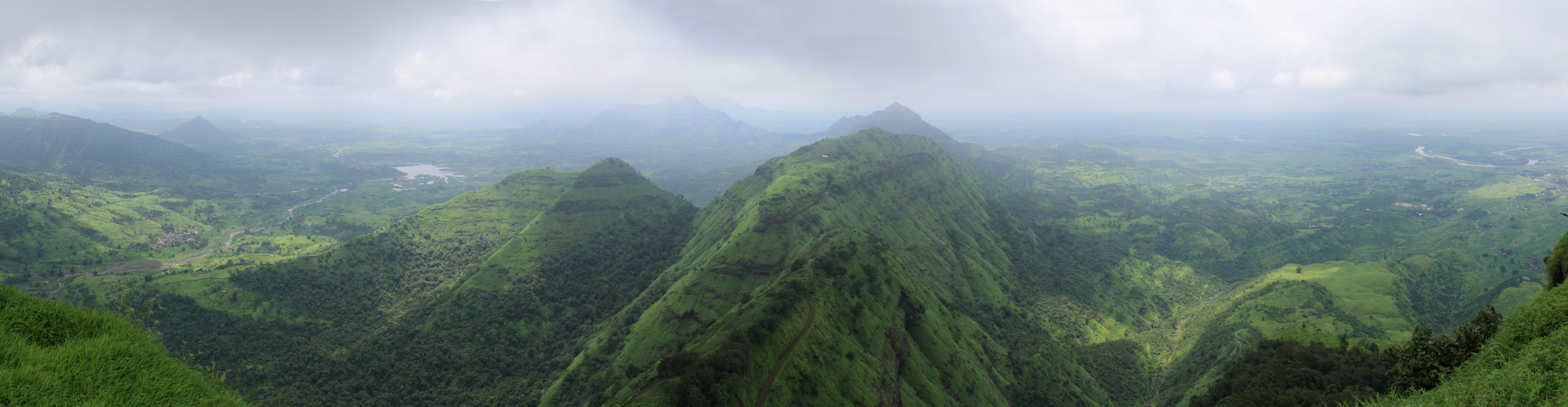
Western Ghats in India in the dry season (top; May 2010) and rainy season (bottom; August 2010)

== Biodiversity ==
The Western Ghats region is a biodiversity hotspot. It consists of nearly 30% of all the species of flora and fauna found in India, most of which are endemic to this region. At least 325 globally threatened species occur in the Western Ghats.

=== Flora ===
The Western Ghats consist of four tropical and subtropical moist broadleaf terrestrial ecoregions of the Indomalayan realm, with the northern portion of the range generally drier than the southern portion. These include the following:

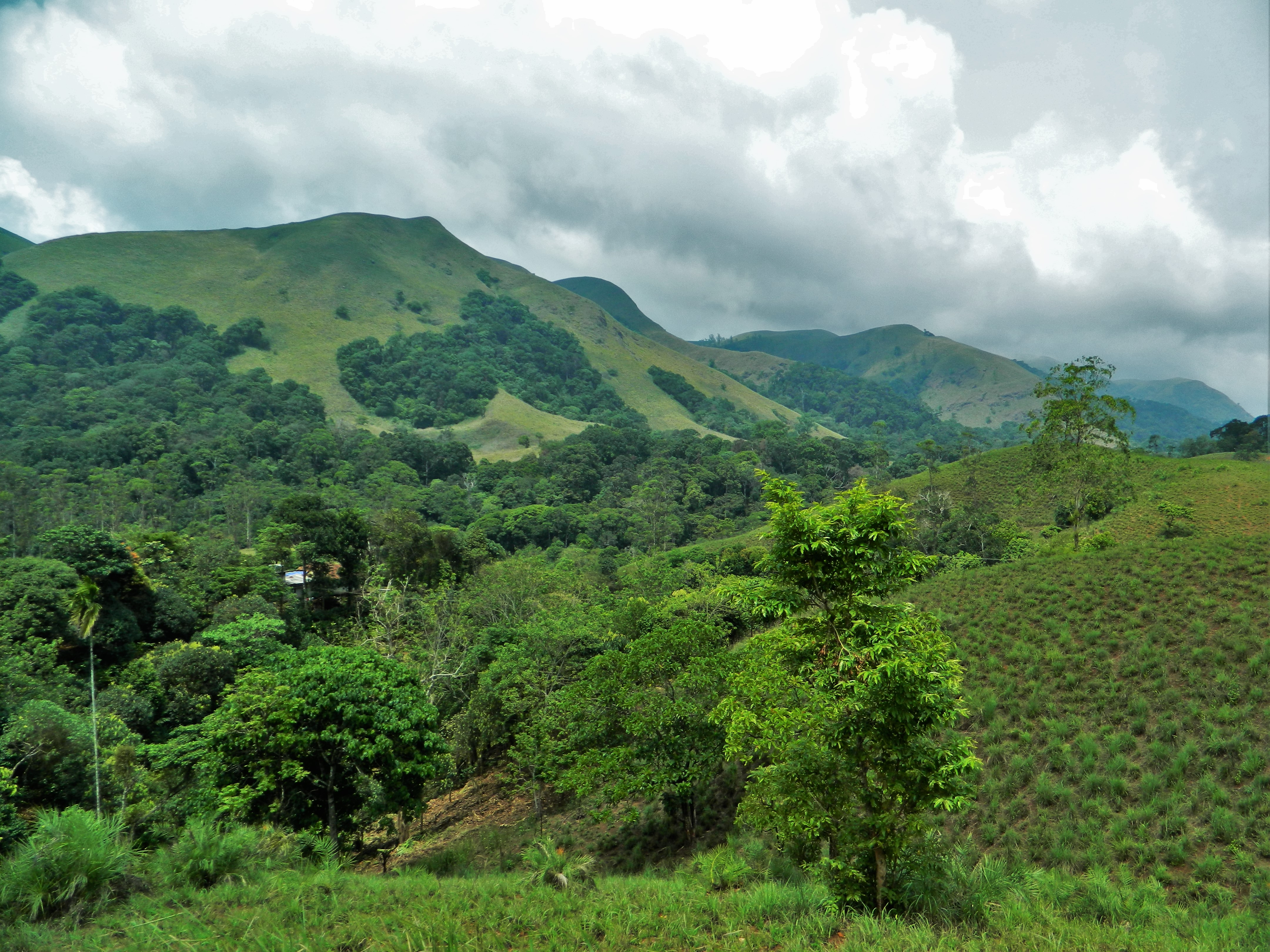
Sholas, a unique type of stunted tropical montane forest found in the valleys

Terrestrial ecoregions of Western Ghats
Region	Area	Areas covered
North Western Ghats montane rain forests	11,900 mi^{2} (31,000 km^{2})	Goa, Karnataka, Maharashtra, Tamil Nadu
South Western Ghats montane rain forests	8,700 mi^{2} (23,000 km^{2})	Karnataka,Kerala, Tamil Nadu
North Western Ghats moist deciduous forests	4,831 mi^{2} (12,510 km^{2})	Gujarat, Karnataka, Maharashtra
South Western Ghats moist deciduous forests	2,382 mi^{2} (6,170 km^{2})	Karnataka, Kerala, Tamil Nadu

Other types of ecosystems include dry deciduous forests on the leeward rain shadow region, scrub forests at the foothills, peat bogs, and swamps. Montane grasslands are found in high altitude locations in the south Western Ghats interspersed with sholas, a unique type of stunted tropical montane forest found in the valleys between the mountains.

Earlier sources indicated about four to five thousand vascular plant species of which nearly one-third was endemic to the region. Later studies and publications have recorded 7,402 species of flowering plants occurring in the Western Ghats of which 5,588 were described as indigenous, 376 are naturalized exotics, and 1,438 species are cultivated or planted. Among the indigenous species, 2,253 species are endemic to India and of them, 1,273 species are exclusively confined to the Western Ghats. 645 tree species were recorded with a high endemic ratio of 56%. There are 850 to 1,000 species of bryophytes, including 682 species of mosses (28% endemic) and 280 species of liverworts (43% endemic), 277 species of pteridophytes and 949 species of lichens (26.7% endemic).

=== Fauna ===
The Western Ghats are home to thousands of species of fauna, including at least 325 globally threatened species. As per a 2010 report, following is the distribution of faunal species in the Western Ghats apart from more than 6,000 insect species.

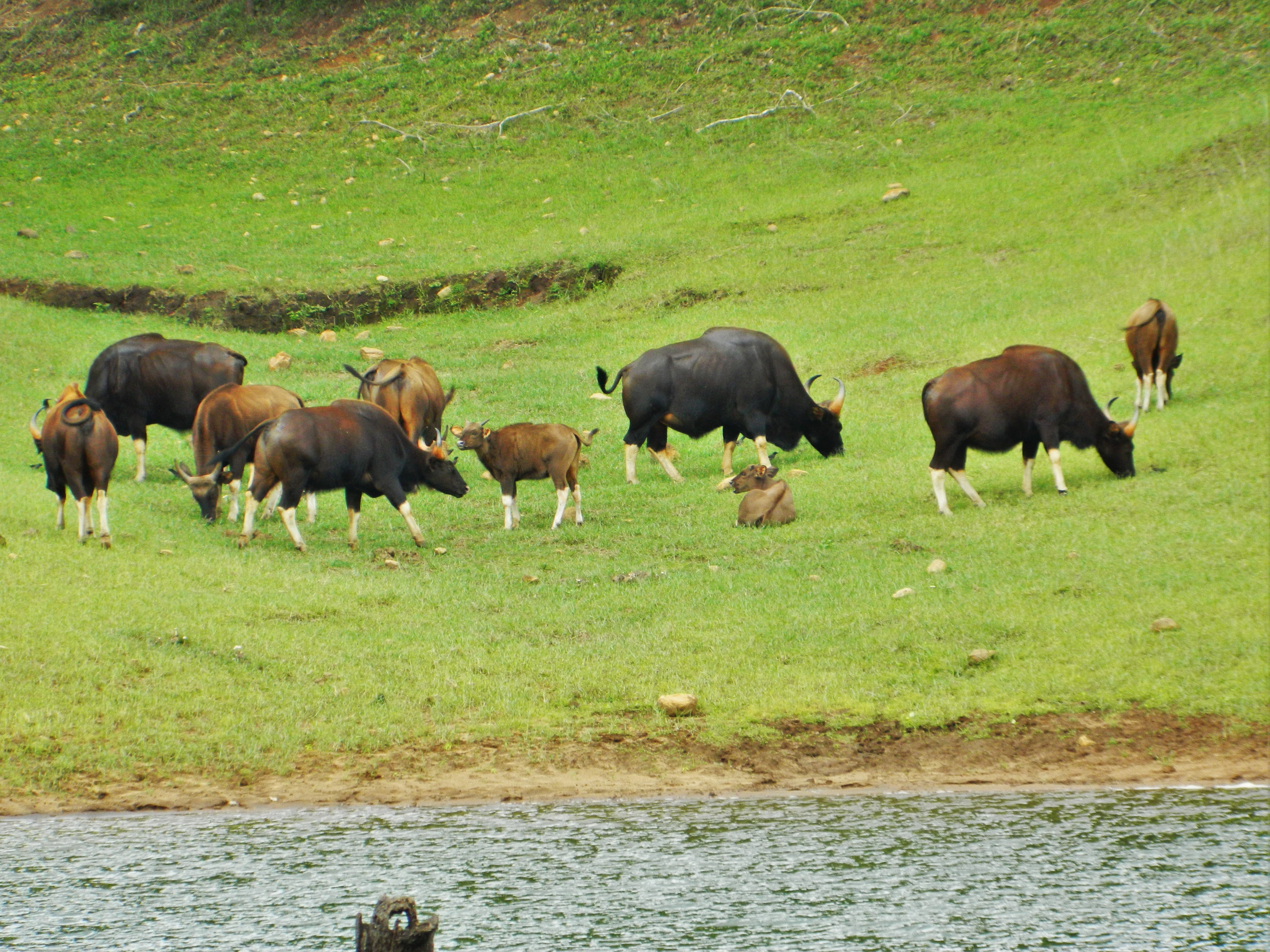
A gaur herd

Fauna of Western Ghats (2010)
Taxonomic group	Species	Endemic	% Endemic	Endangered
Mammals	120	14	12%	31
Birds	508	19	4%	15
Amphibians	121	94	78%	43
Reptiles	156	97	62%	5
Fishes	218	116	53%	1

The Western Ghats region has one of the highest tiger populations, estimated at 985 in 2022. The Western Ghats ecoregion has the largest Indian elephant population in the wild, with an estimated 11,000 individuals across eight distinct populations. Other mammals include endangered and vulnerable species such as the lion-tailed macaque, Nilgiri tahr, leopard, Nilgiri langur, dhole, and gaur. The endemic Nilgiri tahr, which was on the brink of extinction, has recovered and had an estimated 3,122 individuals in 2015. Smaller endemic species include the Malabar large-spotted civet, Nilgiri marten, brown palm civet, stripe-necked mongoose, Indian brown mongoose, small Indian civet, and leopard cat.

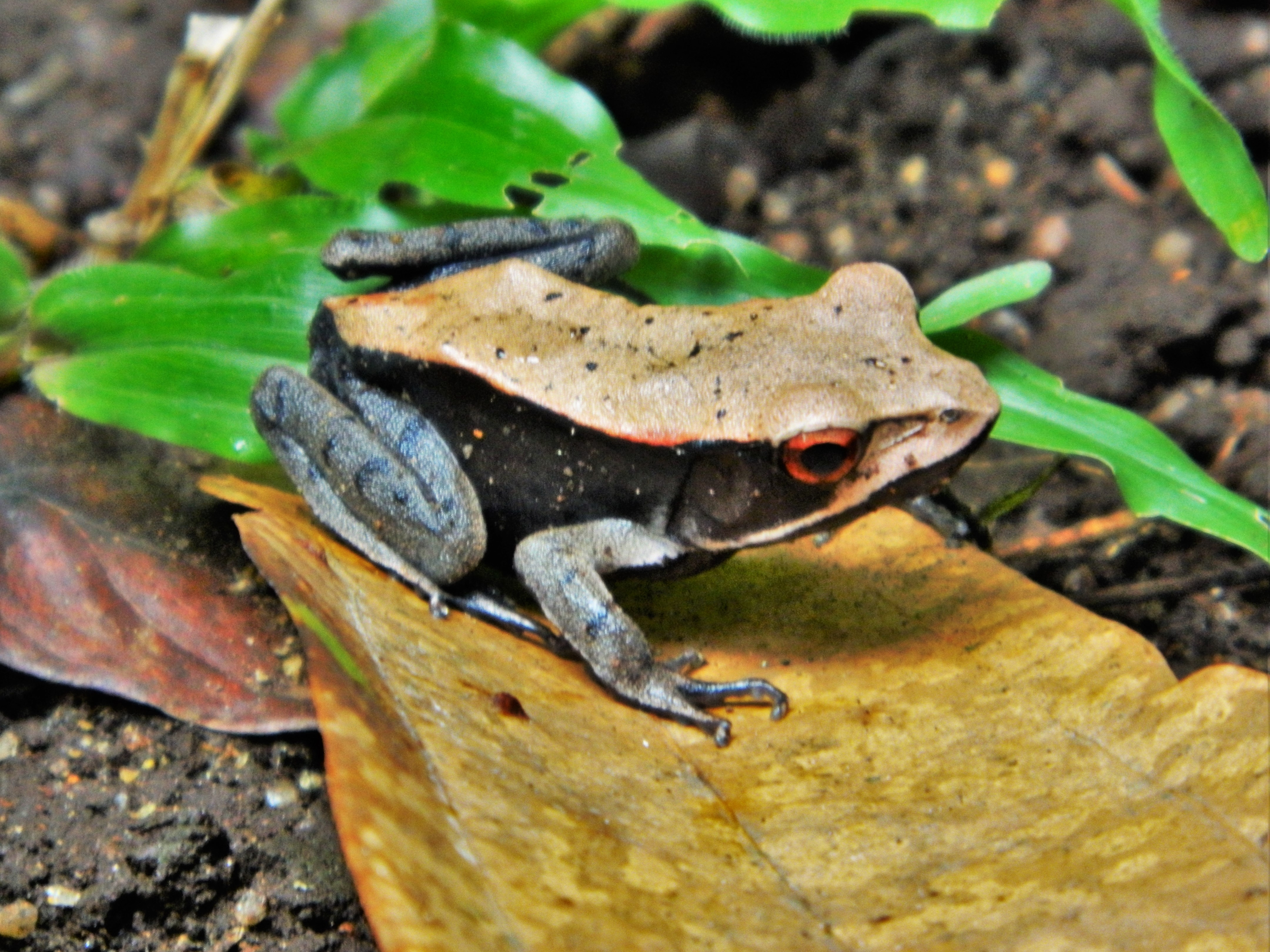
Bicolored frog is endemic to the region

There are at least 19 species of birds endemic to the Western Ghats, including the endangered rufous-breasted laughingthrush, the vulnerable Nilgiri wood-pigeon, white-bellied shortwing, and broad-tailed grassbird, the near threatened grey-breasted laughingthrush, black-and-rufous flycatcher, Nilgiri flycatcher, and Nilgiri pipit, and the least concern Malabar (blue-winged) parakeet, Malabar grey hornbill, white-bellied treepie, grey-headed bulbul, rufous babbler, Wayanad laughingthrush, white-bellied blue-flycatcher, and the crimson-backed sunbird.

As per a 2014 report, at least 227 species of reptiles are found in the Western Ghats. The major population of the snake family Uropeltidae is restricted to the region. Several endemic reptile genera and species occur here, with the region having a significant population of mugger crocodiles. The amphibians of the Western Ghats are diverse and unique, with a high proportion of species being endemic to the tropical rainforests of India. New frog species have continued to be discovered in the 21st century. Frogs of the genera Indirana, Micrixalus, and Nyctibatrachus, toads like Pedostibes, Ghatophryne, and Xanthophryne, arboreal frogs like Ghatixalus, Mercurana, and Beddomixalus, and microhylids like Melanobatrachus are endemic to this region.

Fishes and molluscs

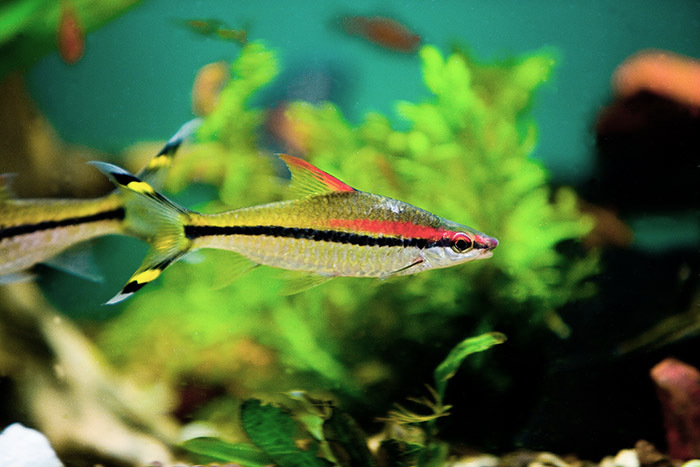
Denison Barb is endemic to the region

The southern region of the Western Ghats exhibits greater fish species richness. There are 13 genera entirely restricted to the Western Ghats (Betadevario, Dayella, Haludaria, Horabagrus, Horalabiosa, Hypselobarbus, Indoreonectes, Lepidopygopsis, Longischistura, Koima, Parapsilorhynchus, Rohtee, and Travancoria). The most species-rich families are the Cyprinids (72 species), hillstream loaches (34 species; including stone loaches, now regarded a separate family), Bagrid catfishes (19 species), and Sisorid catfishes (12 species). The region is home to several ornamental fishes including the endemic Denison barb, melon barb, several species of Dawkinsia barbs, zebra loach, Horabagrus catfish, dwarf pufferfish and dwarf Malabar pufferfish. The rivers are also home to Osteobrama bakeri, and larger species such as the Malabar snakehead, and Malabar mahseer. A few are adapted to an underground life, including some Rakthamichthys swamp eels, and the catfish Horaglanis and Kryptoglanis. 97 freshwater fish species were considered threatened in 2011, including 12 critically endangered, 54 endangered, and 31 vulnerable. The reservoirs in the region are important for their commercial and sport fisheries of rainbow trout, mahseer, and common carp. There are more than 200 freshwater fish species including 35 also known from brackish or marine water. Several new species have been described from the region since the last decade (e.g., Dario urops and Schistura sharavathiensis).

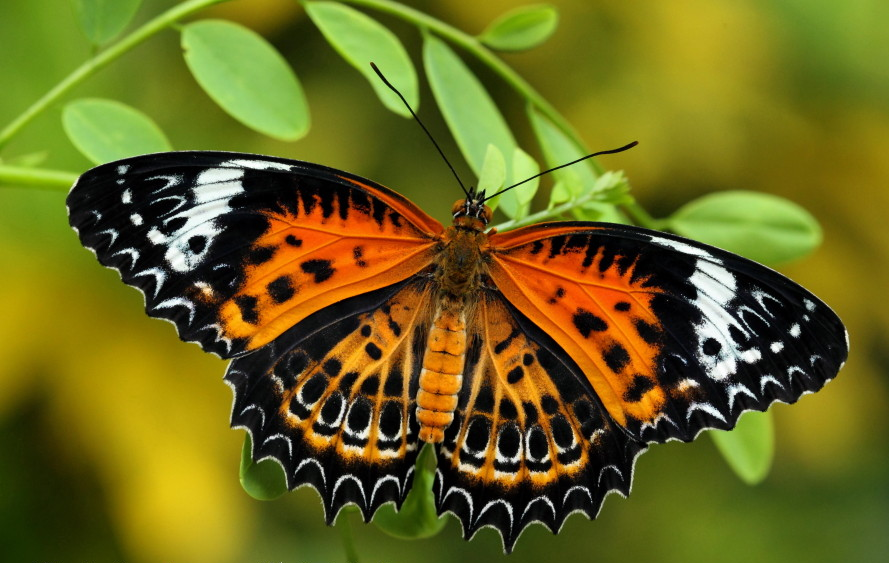
Tamil lacewing, a butterfly found in the region

Seasonal rainfall patterns in the Western Ghats necessitate a period of dormancy for its land snails, resulting in their high abundance and diversity, including at least 258 species of gastropods from 57 genera and 24 families. A total of 77 species of freshwater molluscs (52 gastropods and 25 bivalves) have been recorded from the Western Ghats, but the actual number is likely higher. This includes 28 endemics. Among the threatened freshwater molluscs are the mussel species Pseudomulleria dalyi, which is a Gondwanan relict, and the snail Cremnoconchus, which is restricted to the spray zone of waterfalls. According to the IUCN, four species of freshwater molluscs are considered endangered and three are vulnerable. An additional 19 species are considered data deficient.

Insects

There are roughly 6,000 insect species. Of the 334 Western Ghats butterfly species, 316 species have been reported to occur in the Nilgiri Biosphere Reserve. The Western Ghats are home to 174 species of odonates (107 dragonflies and 67 damselflies), including 69 endemics. Most of the endemic odonate are closely associated with rivers and streams, while the non-endemics are typically generalists. There are several species of leeches found all along the Western Ghats.

=== Threats and conservation ===
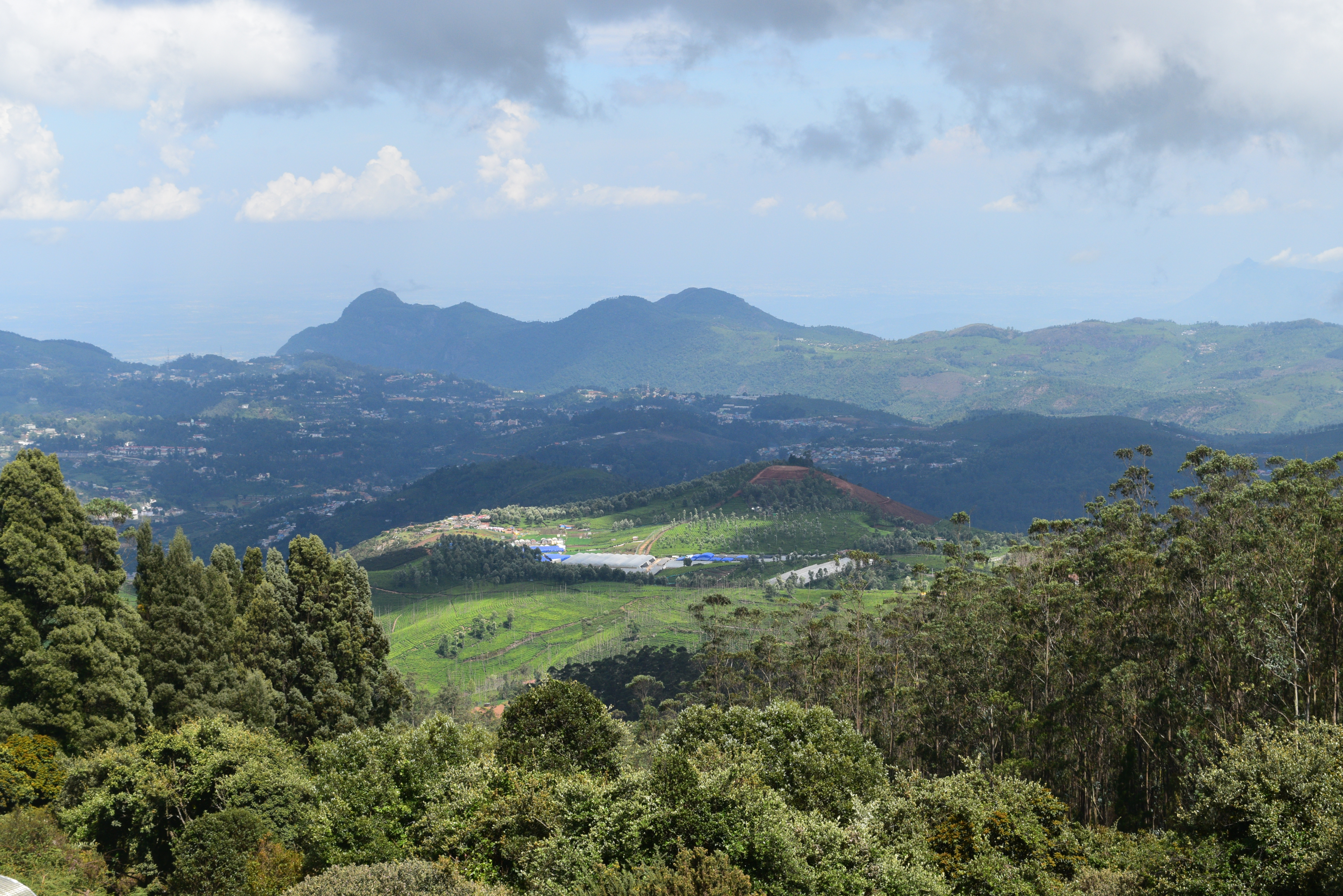
Nilgiri Biosphere Reserve, the largest contiguous protected area in the Western Ghats

Historically, the Western Ghats were covered in dense forests, which formed the natural habitat for wildlife along with the native tribal people. Its inaccessibility made it difficult for people from the plains to cultivate the land and build settlements. After the establishment of British colonial rule in the region, large swathes of territory were cleared for agricultural plantations and timber. The forests in the Western Ghats were severely fragmented due to clear-felling for plantations. The introduction of non-native species threatened the rare endemic species and habitat specialists, which depleted faster than other species. Complex and species-rich habitats like the tropical rainforests are much more adversely affected than other habitats. The primary threats to fauna were not only from habitat loss, but also from overexploitation, illicit grazing, mining, poaching, and introduced species.

Arecanut plantation abutting western ghats forest in Uttara Kannada

The Government of India has established many protected areas, including two biosphere reserves, 13 national parks to restrict human access, several wildlife sanctuaries to protect specific endangered species, and many reserve forests. The Nilgiri Biosphere Reserve, comprising 5,500 km^{2} (2,100 sq mi) of the forests, forms the largest contiguous protected area in the Western Ghats. In August 2011, the Western Ghats Ecology Expert Panel (WGEEP), appointed by the Union Ministry of Environment and Forests to assess the biodiversity and environmental issues of the Western Ghats, designated the entire region as an Ecologically Sensitive Area (ESA) and assigned three levels of Ecological Sensitivity to its different regions. Subsequent committees formed have made various recommendations to protect the region. In 2006, India applied to the UNESCO Man and the Biosphere Programme (MAB) for the Western Ghats to be listed as a protected World Heritage Site. In 2012, 39 sites divided into seven clusters across the Western Ghats, were declared as World Heritage Sites.

== See also ==
- Ghat Roads
