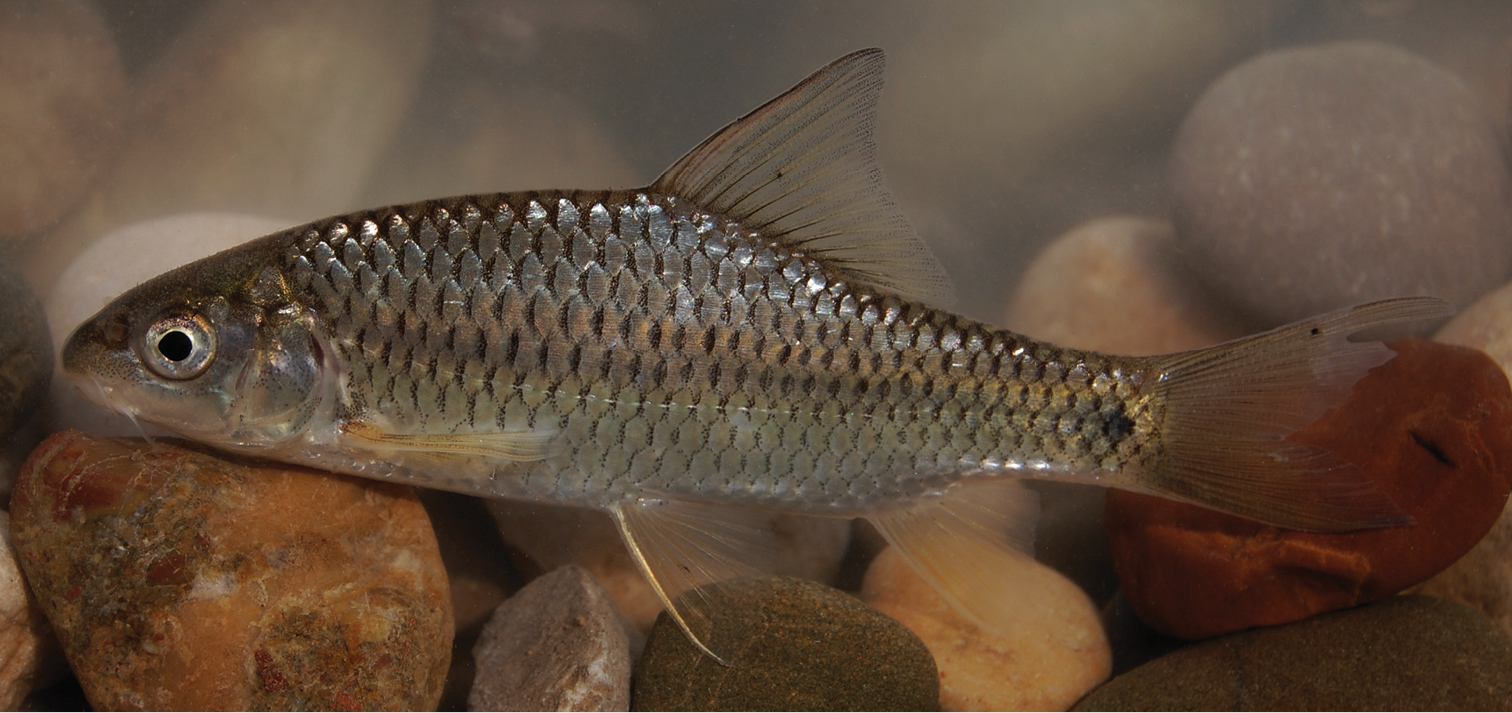

Conservation status
- Vulnerable (IUCN 3.1)

Scientific classification
- Kingdom: Animalia
- Phylum: Chordata
- Class: Actinopterygii
- Order: Cypriniformes
- Family: Cyprinidae
- Subfamily: Torinae
- Genus: Carasobarbus
- Species: C. kosswigi

Binomial name
- Carasobarbus kosswigi (Ladiges, 1960)

Synonyms
- Barbus kosswigi (Ladiges, 1960); Cyclocheilichthys kosswigi Ladiges, 1960; Kosswigobarbus kosswigi (Ladiges, 1960)

= Kisslip himri =

Species of fish

The kisslip himri or Kosswig's barb (Carasobarbus kosswigi) is a species of cyprinid fish of the genus Carasobarbus that is found in the Tigris-Euphrates river system in Iran and Turkey. It was originally described as Cyclocheilichthys kosswigi.
