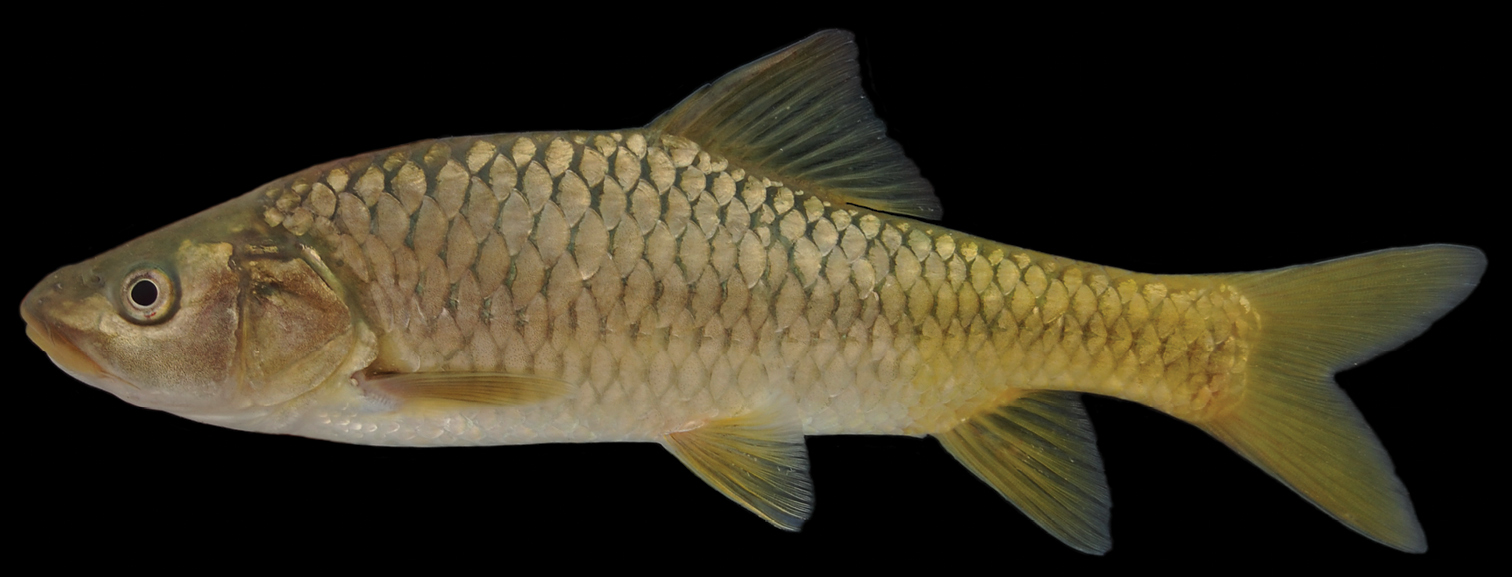
- Carasobarbus canis

Conservation status
- Near Threatened (IUCN 3.1)

Scientific classification
- Kingdom: Animalia
- Phylum: Chordata
- Class: Actinopterygii
- Order: Cypriniformes
- Family: Cyprinidae
- Subfamily: Torinae
- Genus: Carasobarbus
- Species: C. canis

Binomial name
- Carasobarbus canis (Valenciennes, 1842)

Synonyms
- Barbus canis Valenciennes, 1842; Luciobarbus canis (Valenciennes, 1842); Tor canis (Valenciennes, 1842)

= Jordan himri =

Species of fish

The Jordan himri (Carasobarbus canis) is a ray-finned fish species in the family Cyprinidae.

It is found in Israel, Jordan, and Syria. Its natural habitats are rivers and freshwater lakes. It is not considered a threatened species by the IUCN.
