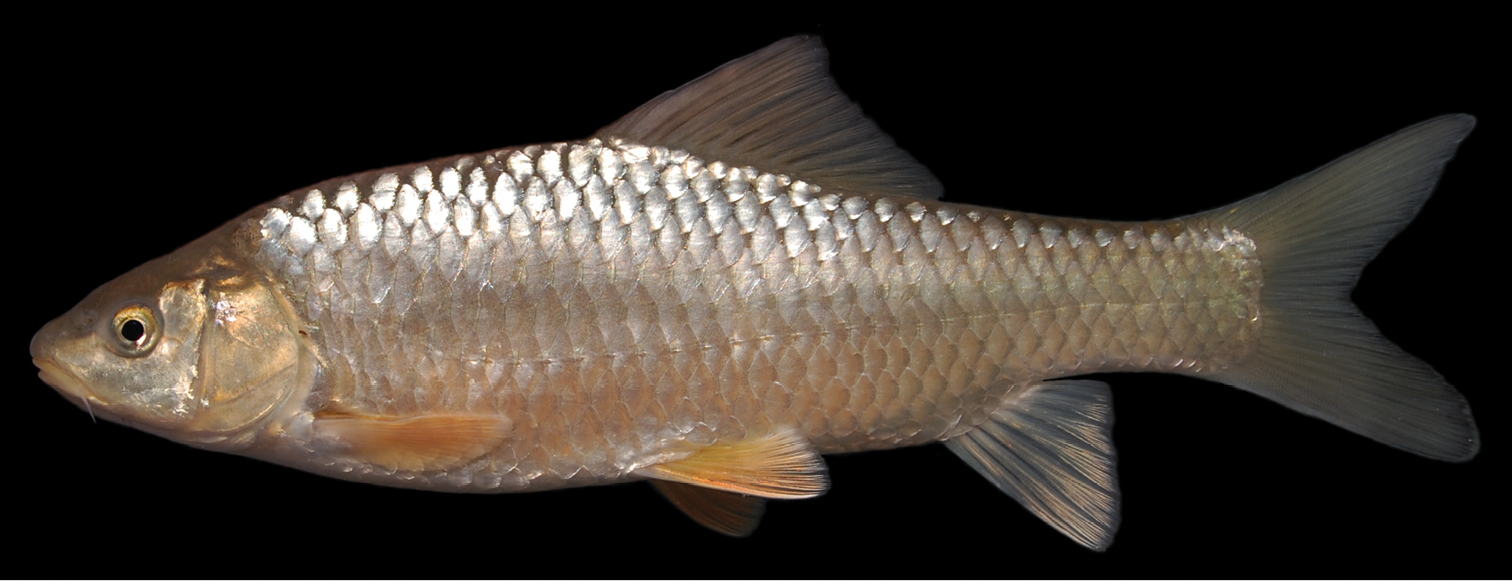

Conservation status
- Near Threatened (IUCN 3.1)

Scientific classification
- Kingdom: Animalia
- Phylum: Chordata
- Class: Actinopterygii
- Order: Cypriniformes
- Family: Cyprinidae
- Subfamily: Torinae
- Genus: Carasobarbus
- Species: C. chantrei

Binomial name
- Carasobarbus chantrei (Sauvage, 1882)

Synonyms
- Barbus chantrei (Sauvage, 1882)

= Orontes himri =

Species of fish

The Orontes himri (Carasobarbus chantrei) is a ray-finned fish species in the family Cyprinidae.

It is found in Syria and Turkey. Its natural habitats are rivers and freshwater lakes. It is threatened by habitat loss.

== Endangerment ==
According to the IUCN Red List endangered species the population is declining as a result of habitat degradation in the Orontes River basin in Turkey, and in Syria.
