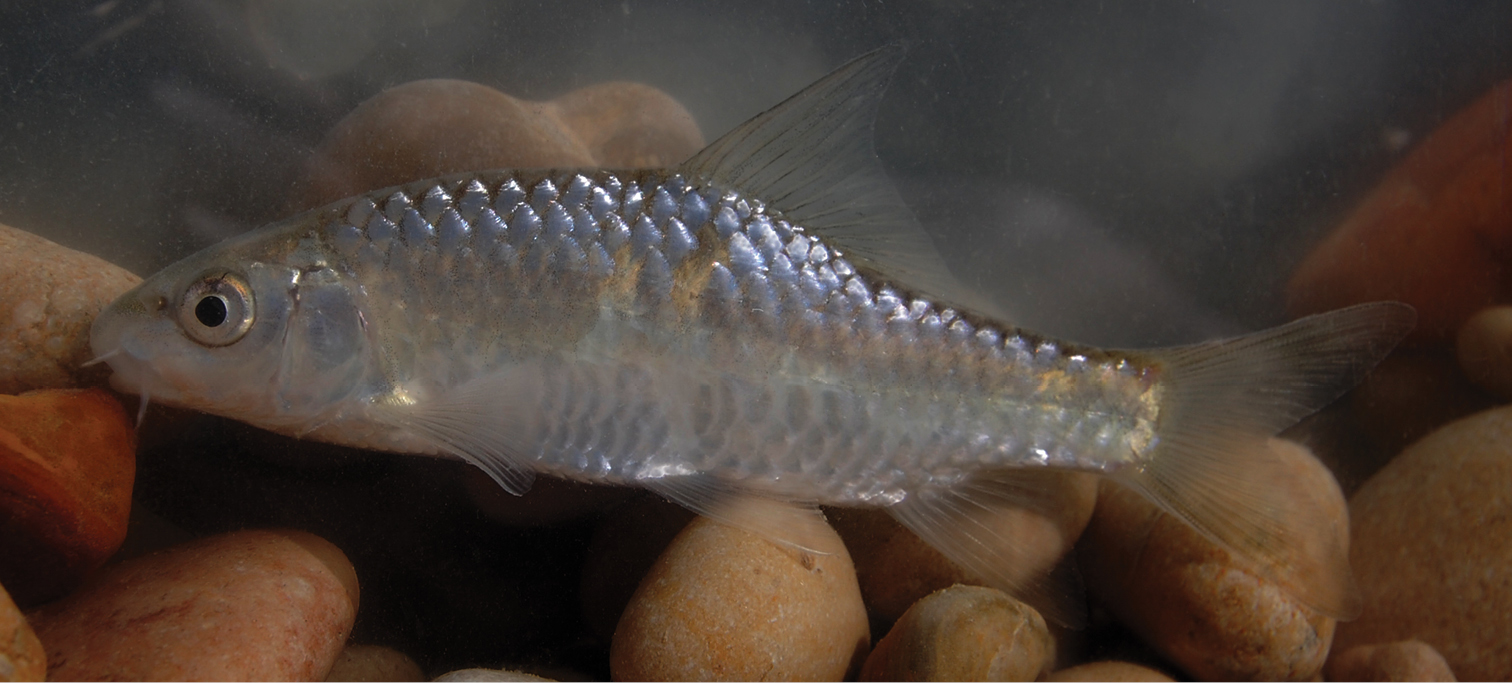

Scientific classification
- Kingdom: Animalia
- Phylum: Chordata
- Class: Actinopterygii
- Order: Cypriniformes
- Family: Cyprinidae
- Subfamily: Torinae
- Genus: Carasobarbus
- Species: C. sublimus

Binomial name
- Carasobarbus sublimus Coad & Najafpour, 1997

Synonyms
- Barbus sublimus Coad & Najafpour, 1997

= Carasobarbus sublimus =

Species of fish

Carasobarbus sublimus is a species of ray-finned fish in the genus Carasobarbus. It is endemic to the River Tigris in Iran and Iraq.
