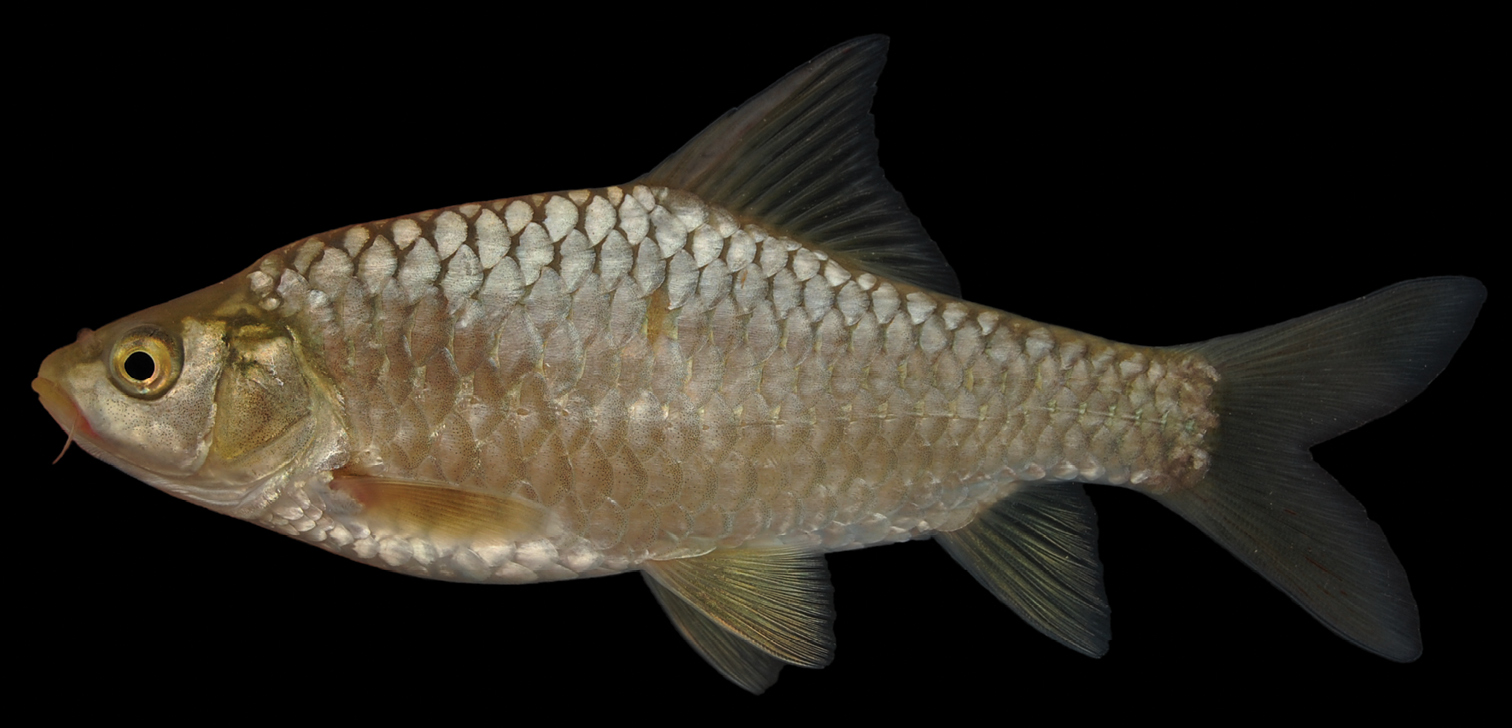

Conservation status
- Least Concern (IUCN 3.1)

Scientific classification
- Kingdom: Animalia
- Phylum: Chordata
- Class: Actinopterygii
- Division: Teleostei
- Order: Cypriniformes
- Family: Cyprinidae
- Subfamily: Torinae
- Genus: Carasobarbus
- Species: C. luteus

Binomial name
- Carasobarbus luteus (Heckel, 1843)

Synonyms
- Barbus luteus (Heckel, 1843); Systomus luteus Heckel, 1843

= Mesopotamian himri =

Species of fish

The Mesopotamian himri (Carasobarbus luteus) is a species of ray-finned fish in the genus Carasobarbus.
