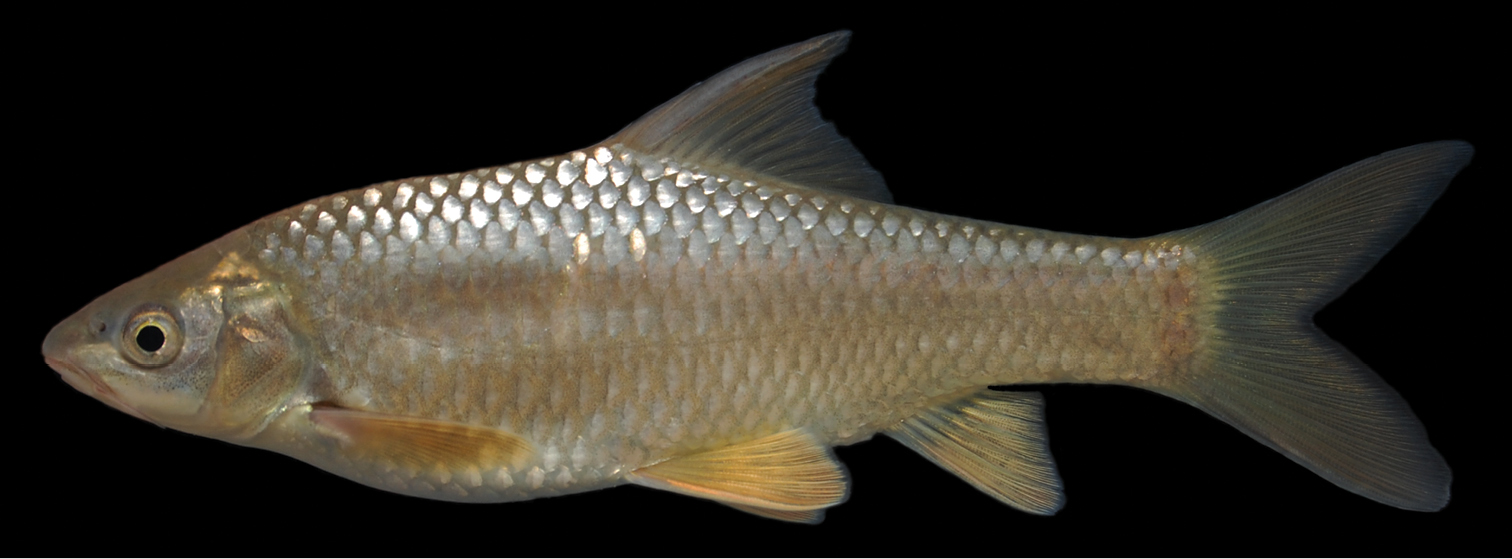
- Photo, 2013

Conservation status
- Critically Endangered (IUCN 3.1)

Scientific classification
- Kingdom: Animalia
- Phylum: Chordata
- Class: Actinopterygii
- Order: Cypriniformes
- Family: Cyprinidae
- Subfamily: Torinae
- Genus: Carasobarbus
- Species: C. harterti

Binomial name
- Carasobarbus harterti (Günther, 1901)

Synonyms
- Barbus fritschii harteti Günther, 1901; Barbus harterti Günther, 1901 (basionym); Barbus harteti Günther, 1901 (lapsus); Labeobarbus harterti (Günther, 1901); Pseudotor fritschii harteti (Günther, 1901)

= Carasobarbus harterti =

Species of fish

Carasobarbus harterti, the stripeless himri, is a ray-finned fish species in the family Cyprinidae. It is found only in Morocco.

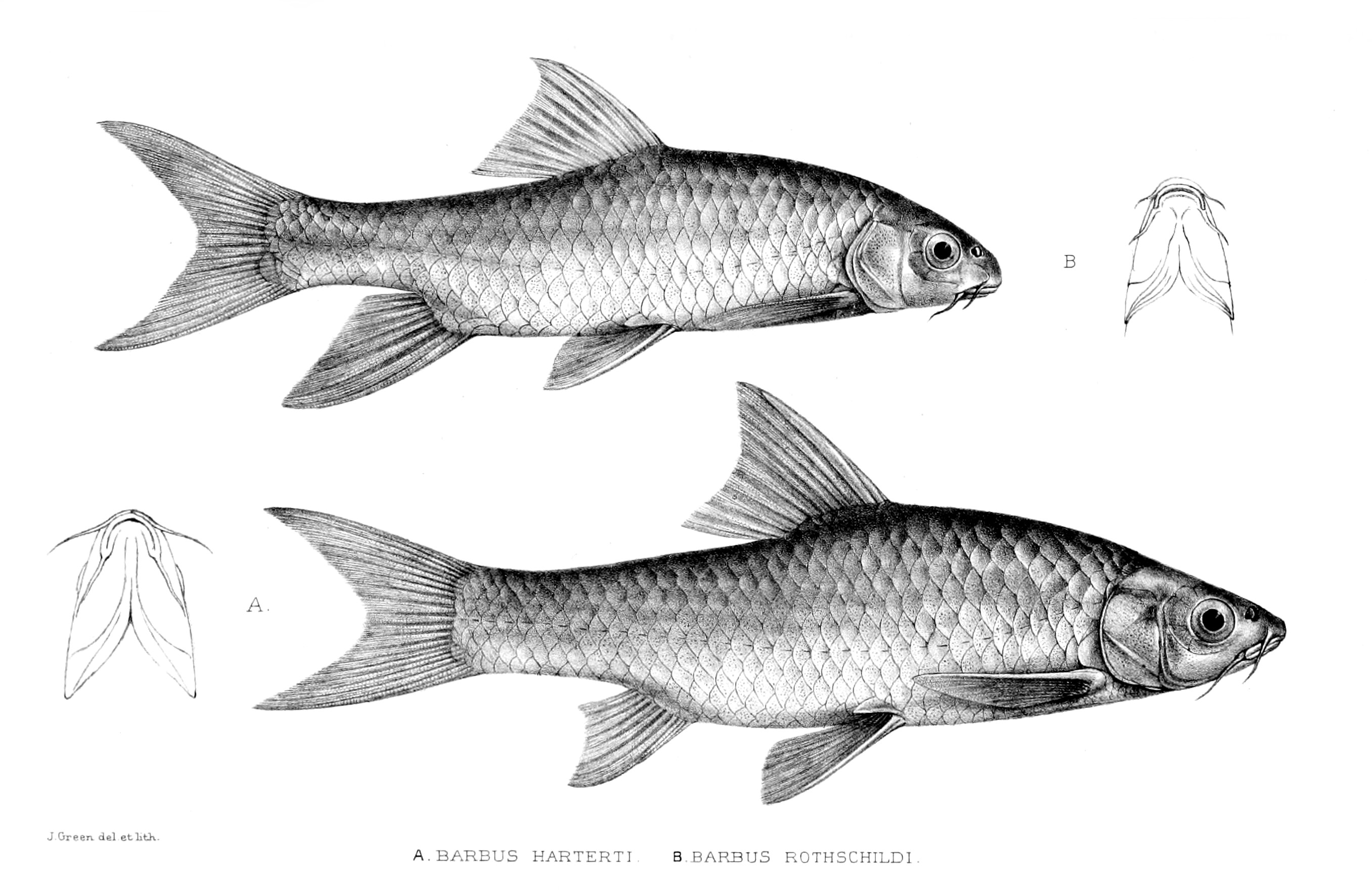
Illustration from original species description. A (bottom)

Its natural habitat is the Oum Er-Rbia River system, upstream of the Al Massira Dam. It is threatened by habitat loss and invasive species.
