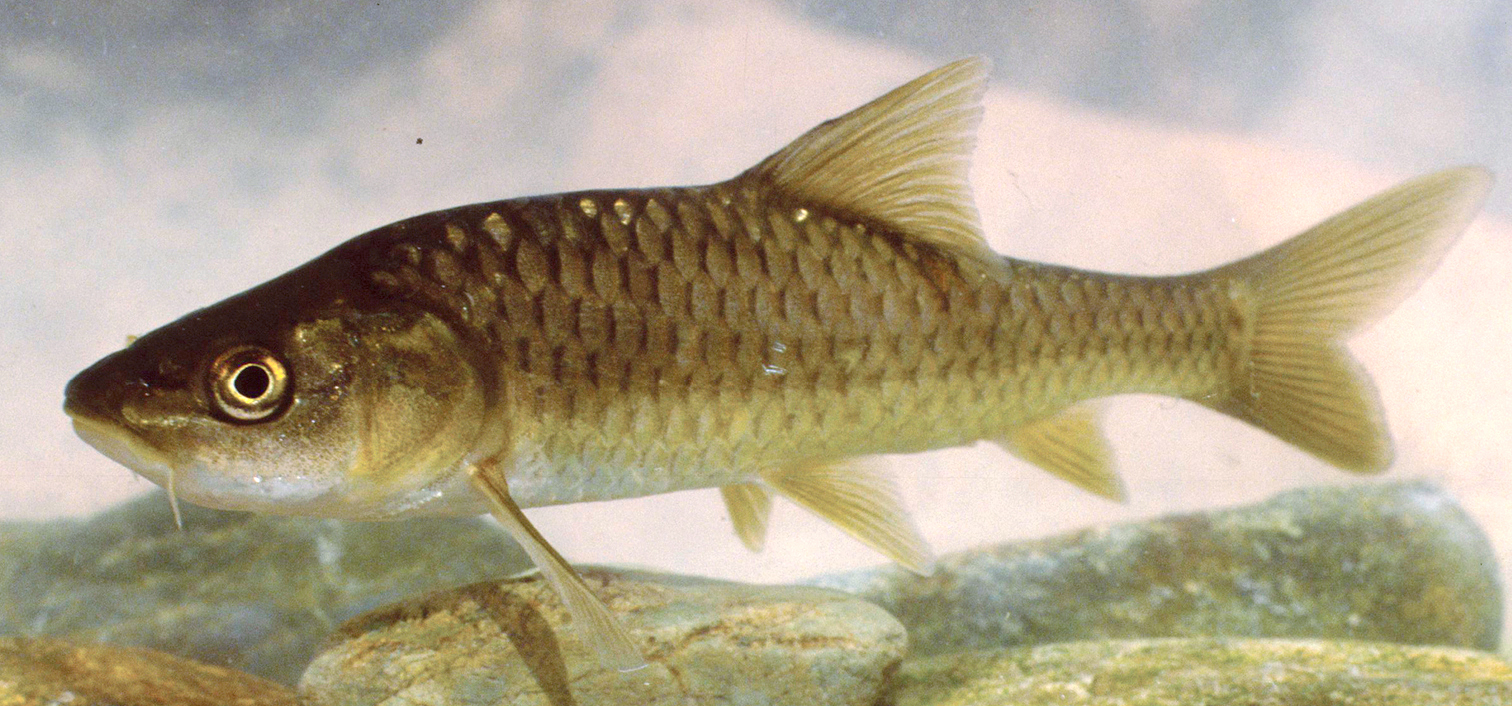

Conservation status
- Endangered (IUCN 3.1)

Scientific classification
- Kingdom: Animalia
- Phylum: Chordata
- Class: Actinopterygii
- Order: Cypriniformes
- Family: Cyprinidae
- Subfamily: Torinae
- Genus: Carasobarbus
- Species: C. apoensis

Binomial name
- Carasobarbus apoensis (Banister & M. A. Clarke, 1977)

Synonyms
- Barbus apoensis Banister & Clarke, 1977

= Arabian himri =

Species of ray-finned fish

The Arabian himri (Carasobarbus apoensis) is a species of ray-finned fish in the genus Carasobarbus. It is endemic to Saudi Arabia in wadis in the Hijaz Mountains which either drain into the Red Sea or inland.
