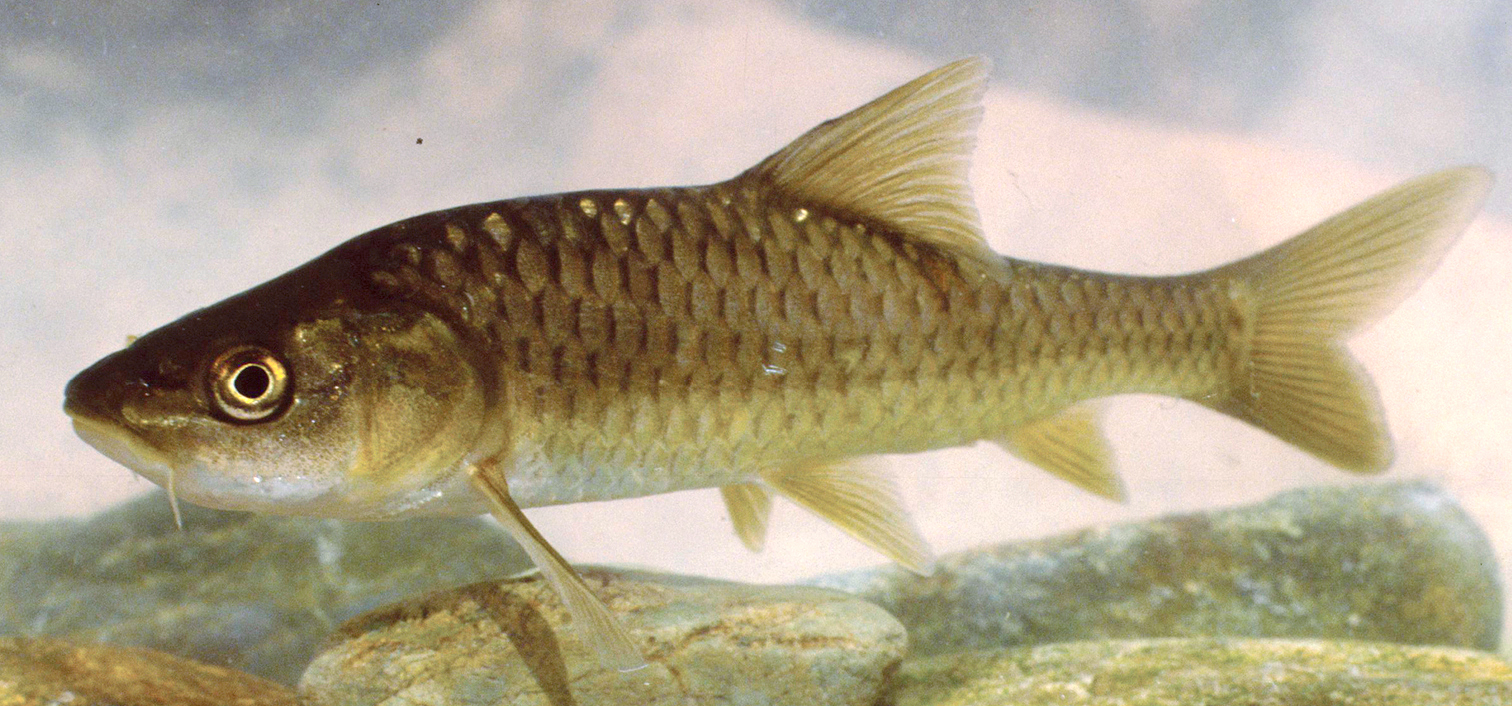
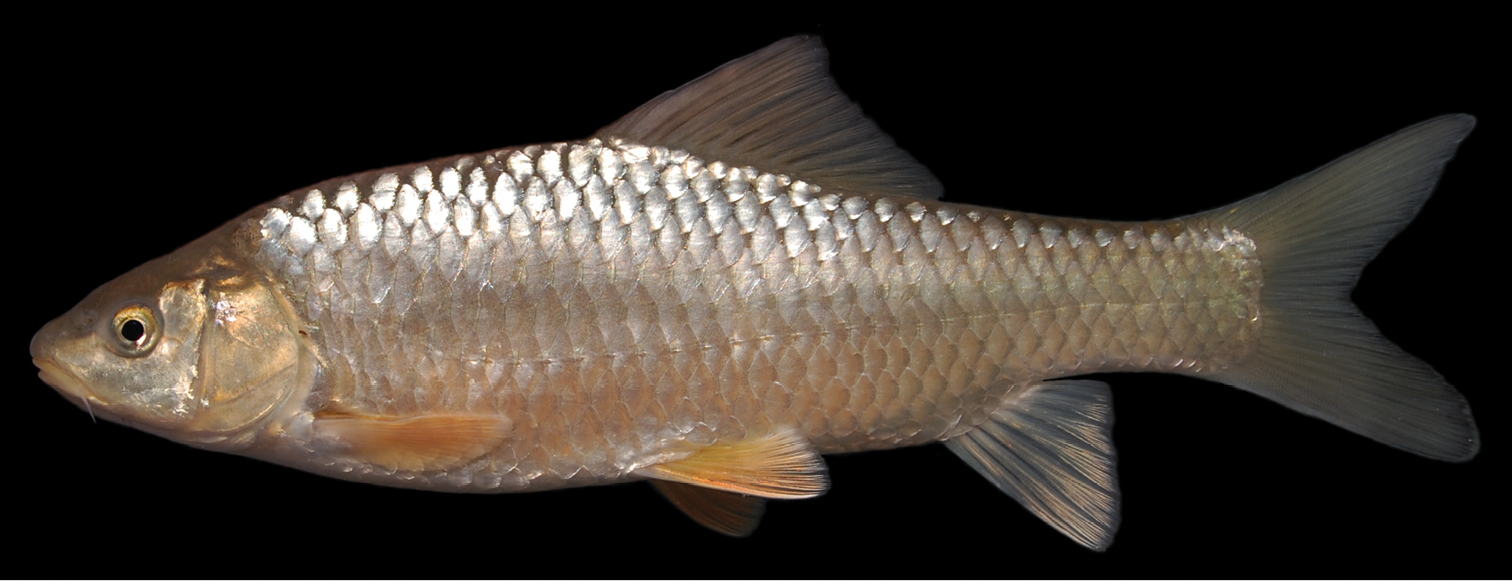
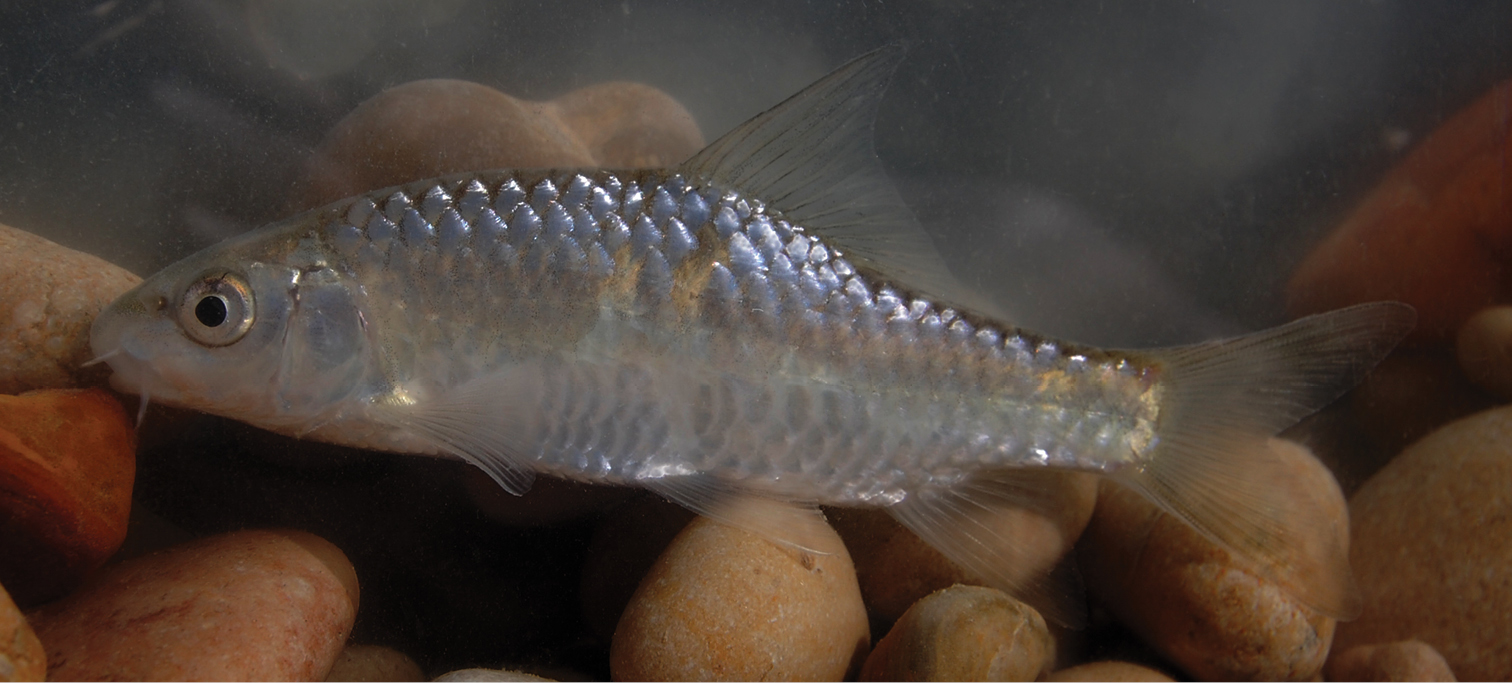
- Carasobarbus apoensis Carasobarbus chantrei Carasobarbus sublimus

Scientific classification
- Kingdom: Animalia
- Phylum: Chordata
- Class: Actinopterygii
- Order: Cypriniformes
- Family: Cyprinidae
- Subfamily: Torinae
- Genus: Carasobarbus; M. S. Karaman (sr), 1971

Type species
- Systomus luteus Heckel, 1843

Synonyms
- Kosswigobarbus Karaman, 1971; Pseudotor Karaman, 1971

= Carasobarbus =

Genus of fishes

Carasobarbus, the himris, is a small genus of ray-finned fishes in the family Cyprinidae. Its species are found in rivers, streams, lakes and ponds in Western Asia and Northwest Africa. C. canis can reach 66 cm (26 in) in total length, but most other species are up to around half or one-quarter of that size.

Like many other "barbs", it was long included in Barbus. It appears to be a fairly close relative of the typical barbels and relatives – the genus Barbus proper –, but closer still to the large hexaploid species nowadays separated in Labeobarbus. Because of the improved phylogenetic knowledge which indicates Barbus was highly paraphyletic in its wide circumscription –, Carasobarbus and some other closely related "barbs" (e.g. "Barbus" reinii) may be included in Labeobarbus to avoid a profusion of very small genera. This genus is now classified in the subfamily Torinae.

== Species ==
Carasobarbus contains the following species:

- Carasobarbus apoensis (Banister & M. A. Clarke, 1977) (Arabian himri)
- Carasobarbus canis (Valenciennes, 1842) (Jordan himri)
- Carasobarbus chantrei (Sauvage, 1882) (Orontes himri)
- Carasobarbus doadrioi Jouladeh‐Roudbar, Kaya, Vatandoust & Ghanavi, 2024
- Carasobarbus exulatus (Banister & Clarke, 1977) (Hadramaut himri)
- Carasobarbus fritschii (Günther, 1874)
- Carasobarbus hajhosseini Jouladeh‐Roudbar, Kaya, Vatandoust & Ghanavi, 2024
- Carasobarbus harterti (Günther, 1901)
- Carasobarbus kosswigi (Ladiges, 1960) (Kisslip himri)
- Carasobarbus luteus (Heckel, 1843) (Mesopotamian himri)
- Carasobarbus moulouyensis (Pellegrin, 1924).
- Carasobarbus saadatii Jouladeh‐Roudbar, Kaya, Vatandoust & Ghanavi, 2024
- Carasobarbus sublimus Coad & Najafpour, 1997
