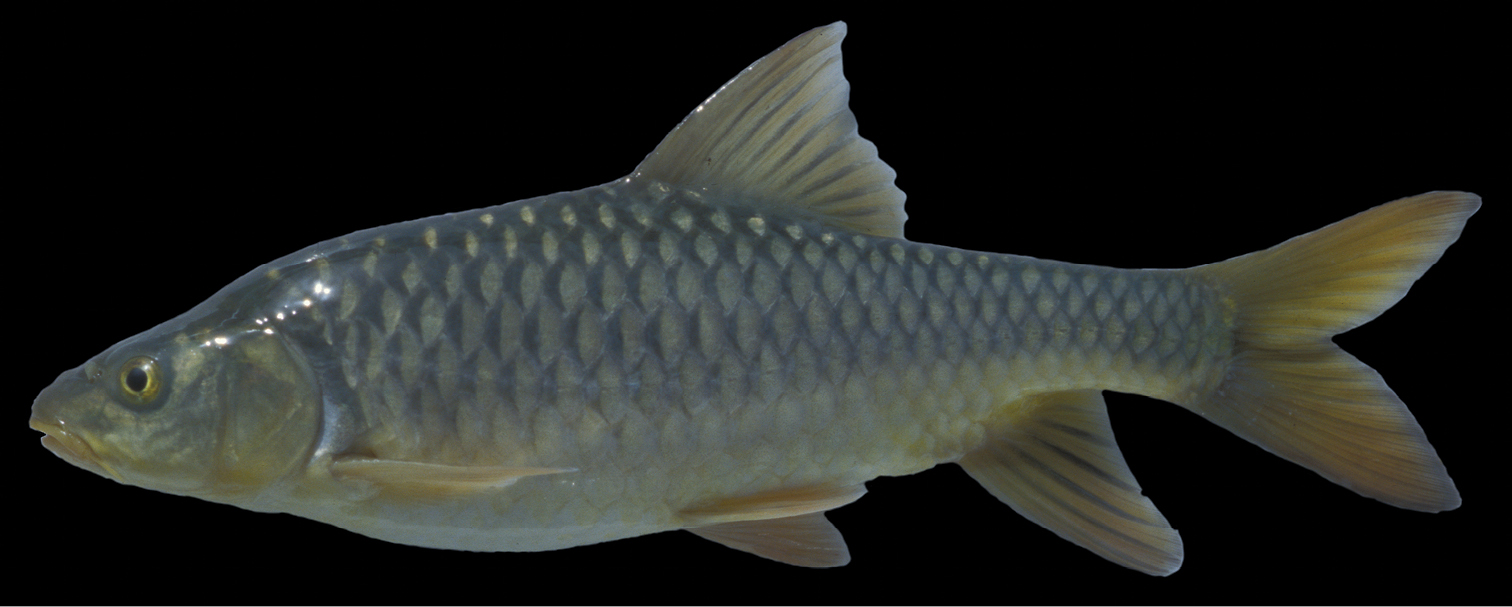

Conservation status
- Endangered (IUCN 3.1)

Scientific classification
- Kingdom: Animalia
- Phylum: Chordata
- Class: Actinopterygii
- Order: Cypriniformes
- Family: Cyprinidae
- Subfamily: Torinae
- Genus: Carasobarbus
- Species: C. exulatus

Binomial name
- Carasobarbus exulatus (Banister & M. A. Clarke, 1977)

Synonyms
- Barbus exulatus Banister & Clarke, 1977

= Hadramaut himri =

Species of fish

The Hadramaut himri (Carasobarbus exulatus) is a species of ray-finned fish in the genus Carasobarbus, it is endemic to Yemen where it occurs in Wadi Hadramaut, and possibly Wadi Maran.
