= Toxotes =

Toxotes may refer to:

- Toxotes (fish), a genus of archerfish
- The singular of Toxotai
- Toxotes, Xanthi, a village in Greece
