= Toxotes kimberleyensis =

Conservation status
- Least Concern (IUCN 3.1)

Scientific classification
- Kingdom: Animalia
- Phylum: Chordata
- Class: Actinopterygii
- Order: Carangiformes
- Family: Toxotidae
- Genus: Toxotes
- Species: T. kimberleyensis

Binomial name
- Toxotes kimberleyensis Allen, 2004
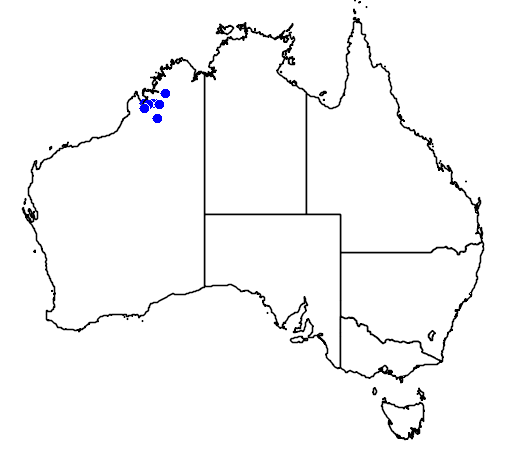
- T. kimberleyensis range

Species of fish

Toxotes kimberleyensis is a species of archerfish found in the Kimberley region of Western Australia. It was first named by Gerald R. Allen in 2004, and is commonly known as the Kimberley archerfish, largescale archerfish, or western archerfish.

== Taxonomy ==
Archerfish are distributed throughout the waters of Australia and Indonesia, including a population in western Australia historically identified as Toxotes oligolepis. In 1978, in his Review of the Archerfishes, Gerald R. Allen suggested that "there is a possibility that [this population] may represent a distinct species". A direct comparison with the type material of T. oligolepis in 2001 revealed the Kimberley specimens differed in several ways, including having a deeper body and shorter dorsal fin spines. The specific name kimberleyensis refers to the Kimberley region of western Australia, where the species is localized.

== Description ==
T. kimberleyensis can be identified from its fins, with five spines and 11–13 soft rays on the dorsal fin, three spines and 14–16 rays on the anal fin, and 12–13 pectoral rays. There are between 28 and 33 scales on the lateral line, which is nearly unbroken except at the pectoral fin. The pelvic fins are short. There are six to seven gill rakers on the lower limb of the first branchial arch.

Toxotes kimberleyensis can reach up to about 12.6 cm (5.0 in) in length, has a large mouth opening at an angle and fine villiform teeth. The head and body are smooth with very fine scales, but the scales are toothed as is common for perciform fish. T. kimberleyensis is silvery or silvery-white in color, with black side markings. The sides of the body are marked with four to five black bars which may be wedge-shaped or rounded. In young specimens, the fins are translucent or transparent, but adults have grey or black fins.

=== Differences from Toxotes oligolepis ===
Toxotes oligolepis and Toxotes kimberleyensis have a similar colour pattern. Nonetheless, T. kimberleyensis differs from T. oligolepis in several notable respects. The type specimen of T. oligolepis was thought to have been collected near Buru. T. oligolepis has longer dorsal spines overall than those observed in the Kimberley region population. The third dorsal spine of T. oligolepis is distinctive and extends higher than the rest of the soft dorsal fin, whereas the fourth and fifth spines of T. kimberleyensis are longest. However, the spines of T. kimberleyensis do not extend beyond the height of the soft portion of the dorsal fin. T. oligolepis also has around 25 scales on its lateral line, compared to 30–31 typically (and up to 33) for T. kimberleyensis.

== Distribution and habitat ==
Toxotes kimberleyensis is restricted to inland fresh water habitats such as rivers. The known range of T. kimberleyensis is limited to the western Kimberley district of Australia, based on surveys conducted over three decades. It is common in the Fitzroy River, but has also been observed in the Isdell River, the Meda River, and the May River, where it is nonetheless rarer. Its relatives, the seven-spot archerfish (T. chatareus) and the banded archerfish (T. jaculatrix) can be found on the coast in brackish water or even saltwater, but T. kimberleyensis only inhabits freshwater environments. However, T. kimberleyensis can be found as much as 300 kilometres (190 mi) upstream in the Fitzroy River and has been observed as far upstream as the Geikie Gorge National Park.

Toxotes kimberleyensis prefers deep freshwater pools but swims near the surface and near the shore. Like all archerfish, it feeds by shooting a jet of water from its mouth, knocking insects on overhanging vegetation near the shore into the water.
