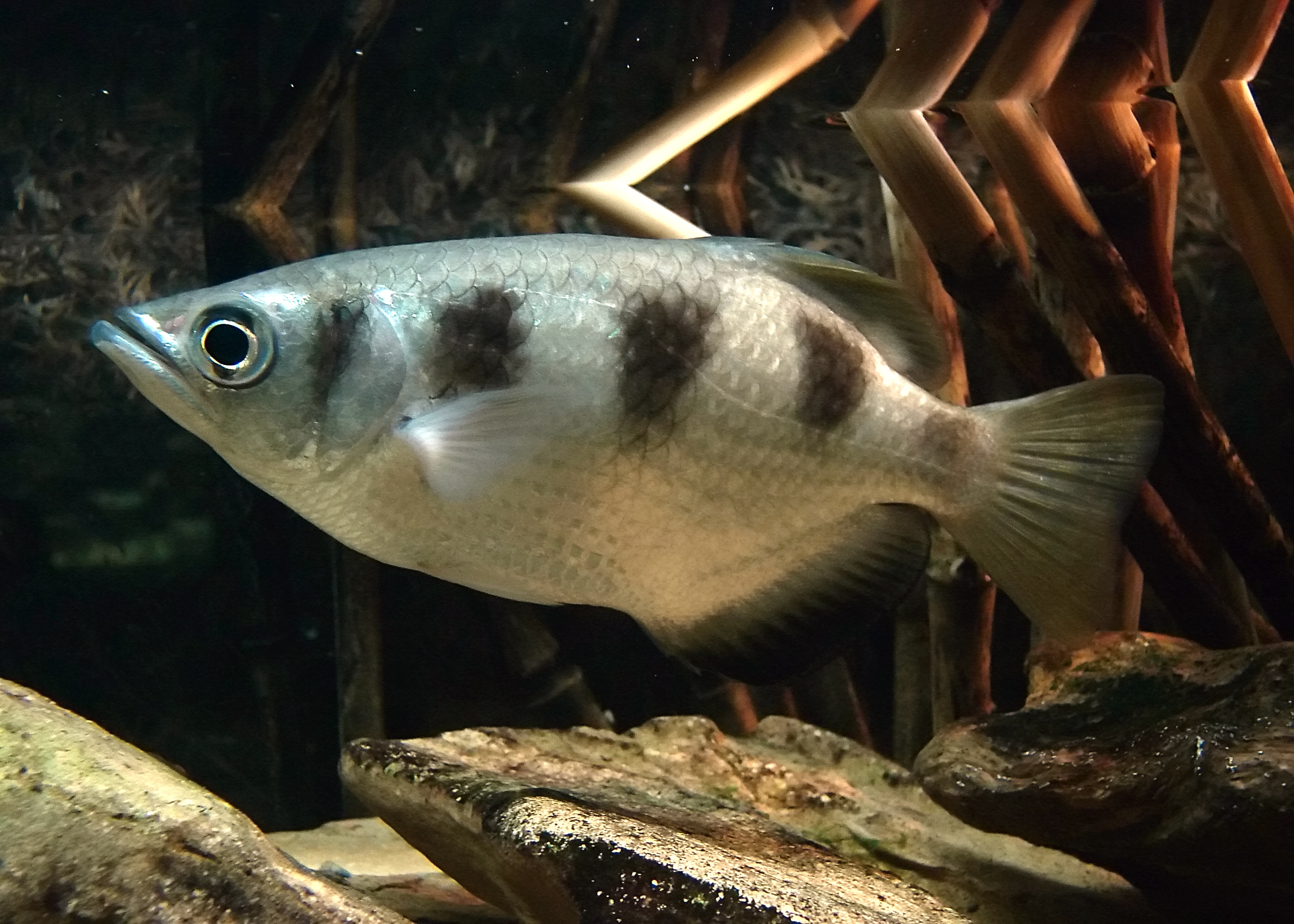
- Toxotes jaculatrix

Scientific classification
- Kingdom: Animalia
- Phylum: Chordata
- Class: Actinopterygii
- Division: Teleostei
- Order: Carangiformes
- Suborder: Toxotoidei
- Family: Toxotidae; Bleeker, 1859

Type species
- Labrus jaculator Shaw, 1803

Genera
- Protoxotes Whitley, 1950; Toxotes Cloquet, 1816

= Archerfish =

Archerfish Temporal range: Eocene–present

Family of fishes

The archerfish (also known as spinner fish or archer fish) or Toxotidae are a family of percomorph tropical fish known for their unique predation technique of "shooting down" land-based insects and other small prey with jets of water spit from their specialized mouths. The family is small, consisting of ten species in two genera, Toxotes and Protoxotes. Most archerfish live in freshwater streams, ponds and wetlands, but two or three species are euryhaline, inhabiting both fresh and brackish water habitats such as estuaries and mangroves. They can be found from India, Bangladesh and Sri Lanka, through Southeast Asia, to Melanesia and Northern Australia.

Archerfish have deep and laterally compressed bodies, with the dorsal fin and the profile a straight line from dorsal fin to mouth. The mouth is protractile, and the lower jaw juts out. Sizes are fairly small, typically up to about 12–18 cm (5–7 in), but T. chatareus can reach 40 cm (16 in).

Archerfish are popular exotic fish for aquaria, but are difficult to feed and maintain by average fishkeepers since they prefer live prey over typical fish foods.

== Taxonomy ==
The taxonomic affiliation of the archerfish was previously uncertain, and they were often placed in the order Perciformes. More recently, phylogenetic studies have identified their closest relatives to be the beachsalmons in the family Leptobramidae, with the two comprising the suborder Toxotoidei within an expanded Carangiformes. The Leptobramidae have features in the oral cavity reminiscent of those that allow the Toxotidae to shoot water, affirming their relationship.

In the past, Toxotes was the only genus within the family. However, a 2022 study revived the genus Protoxotes due to its deep genetic divergence from Toxotes.

=== Species ===
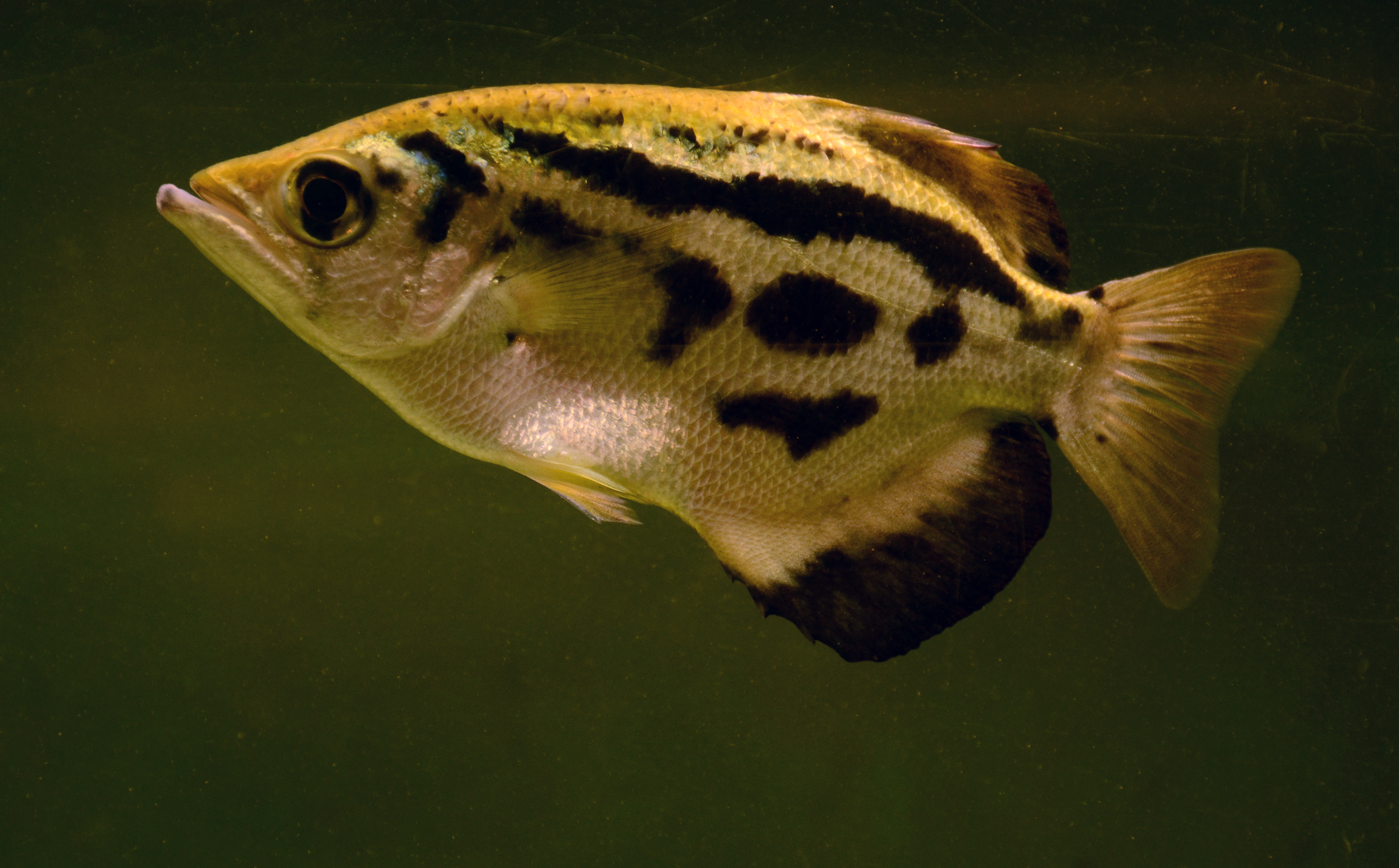
Toxotes blythii

There are 9 valid species in the genus Toxotes:

- Protoxotes Whitley, 1950
  - Proxotes lorentzi (Weber, 1910) – primitive archerfish
- Toxotes Cloquet, 1816
  - Toxotes blythii Boulenger, 1892 – clouded archerfish, zebra archerfish
  - Toxotes carpentariensis Castelnau, 1878
  - Toxotes chatareus (Hamilton, 1822) – largescale archerfish, common archerfish
  - Toxotes jaculatrix (Pallas, 1767) – banded archerfish
  - Toxotes kimberleyensis Allen, 2004 – Kimberley archerfish, western archerfish
  - Toxotes microlepis Günther, 1860 – smallscale archerfish
  - Toxotes oligolepis Bleeker, 1876 – big scale archerfish
  - Toxotes sundaicus Kottelat & Tan, 2018

A single fossil species, †Toxotes beauforti Sanders, 1934 is known from the Eocene-aged Sangkarewang Formation of Sumatra, Indonesia. It very closely resembles modern archerfish species, aside from having six dorsal spines instead of the four or five present in modern species.

== Capture of prey ==
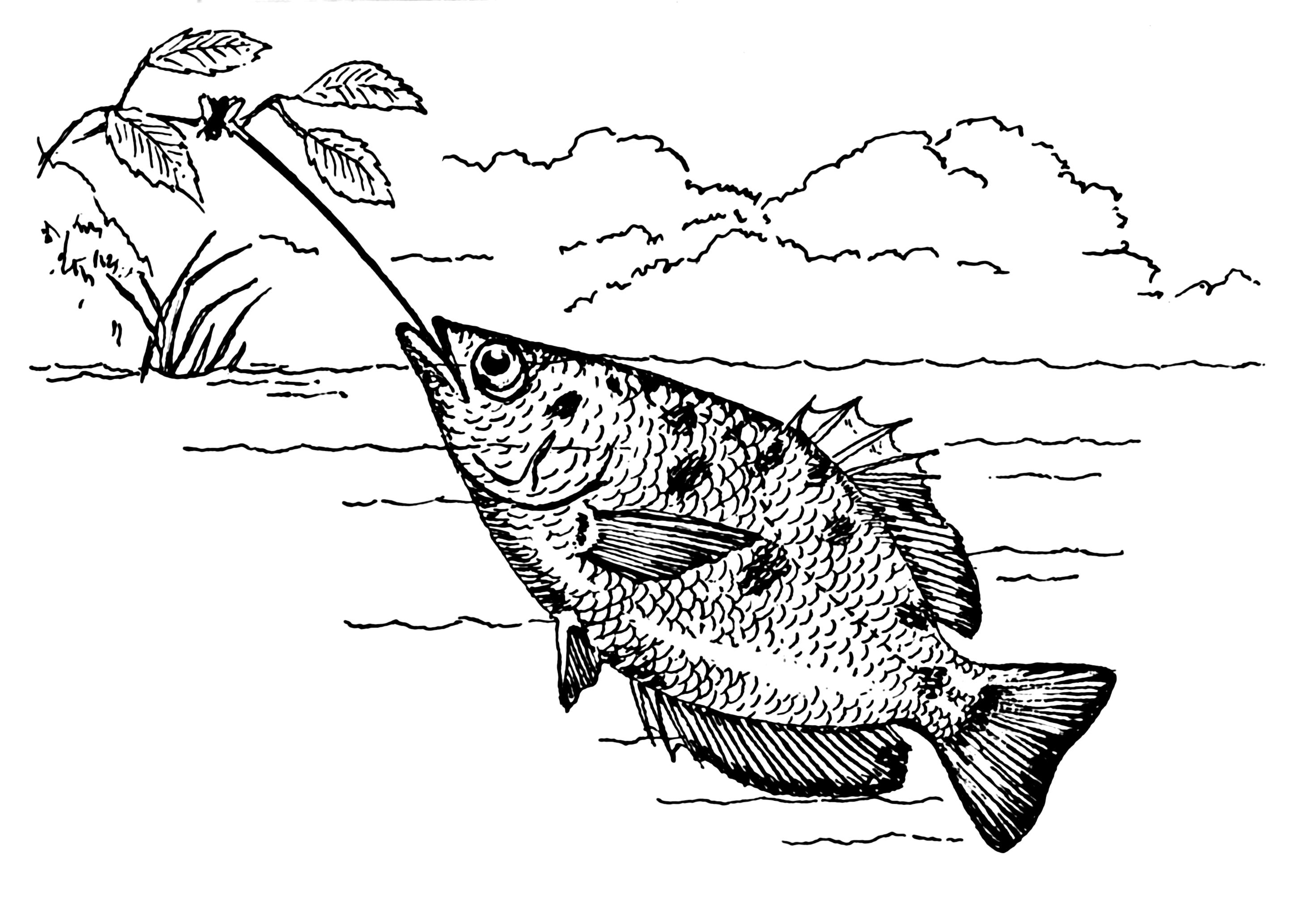
Illustration of an archerfish shooting water at a bug on a hanging branch

Video of an archerfish shooting at prey

Archerfish are remarkably accurate in their shooting; an adult fish almost always hits the target on the first shot. Although it is presumed that all archerfish species do this, it has only been confirmed from T. blythii, T. chatareus and T. jaculatrix. They can bring down insects and other prey up to 3 m (10 ft) above the water's surface. This is partially due to their good eyesight, but also to their ability to compensate for the refraction of light as it passes through the air-water interface when aiming at their prey. They typically spit at prey at a mean angle of about 74° from the horizontal but can still aim accurately when spitting at angles between 45° and 110°.

When an archerfish selects its prey, it rotates its eye so that the image of the prey falls on a particular portion of the eye in the ventral temporal periphery of the retina, and its lips just break the surface, squirting a jet of water at its victim. The archerfish does this by forming a small groove in the roof of its mouth and its tongue into a narrow channel. It then fires by contracting its gill covers and forcing water through the channel, shooting a stream that, shaped by its mouth parts, travels faster at the rear than at the front. This speed differential causes the stream to become a blob directly before impact as the slower leading water is overtaken by the faster trailing water, and it is varied by the fish to account for differences in range. It also makes this one of the few animals that both make and use tools, as they both utilise the water and shape it to make it more useful to them. They are persistent and will make multiple shots if the first one fails.

Young archerfish start shooting when they are about 2.5 cm (1 in) long but are inaccurate at first and must learn from experience. During this learning period, they hunt in small schools. This way, the probability is enhanced that at least one jet will hit its target. A 2006 experimental study found that archerfish appear to benefit from observational learning by watching a performing group member shoot, without having to practice:

This instance of social learning in a fish is most remarkable as it could imply that observers can change their viewpoint, mapping the perceived shooting characteristics of a distant team member into angles and target distances that they later must use to hit.

However, little of their social behaviour is currently known beyond that archerfish are sensitive to, and make changes to their shooting behaviour, when conspecifics are visible to them. This is probably as a result of the potential threat of kleptoparasitism that other archerfish represent to a shooting fish.

An archerfish will often leap out of the water and grab an insect in its mouth if it happens to be within reach. Individuals typically prefer to remain close to the surface of the water.

New research has found that archerfish also use jets to hunt underwater prey, such as those embedded in silt. It is not known whether they learned aerial or underwater shooting first, but the two techniques may have evolved in parallel, as improvements in one can be adapted to the other. This makes it an example of exaptation.

== See also ==
- Projectile use by non-human organisms
