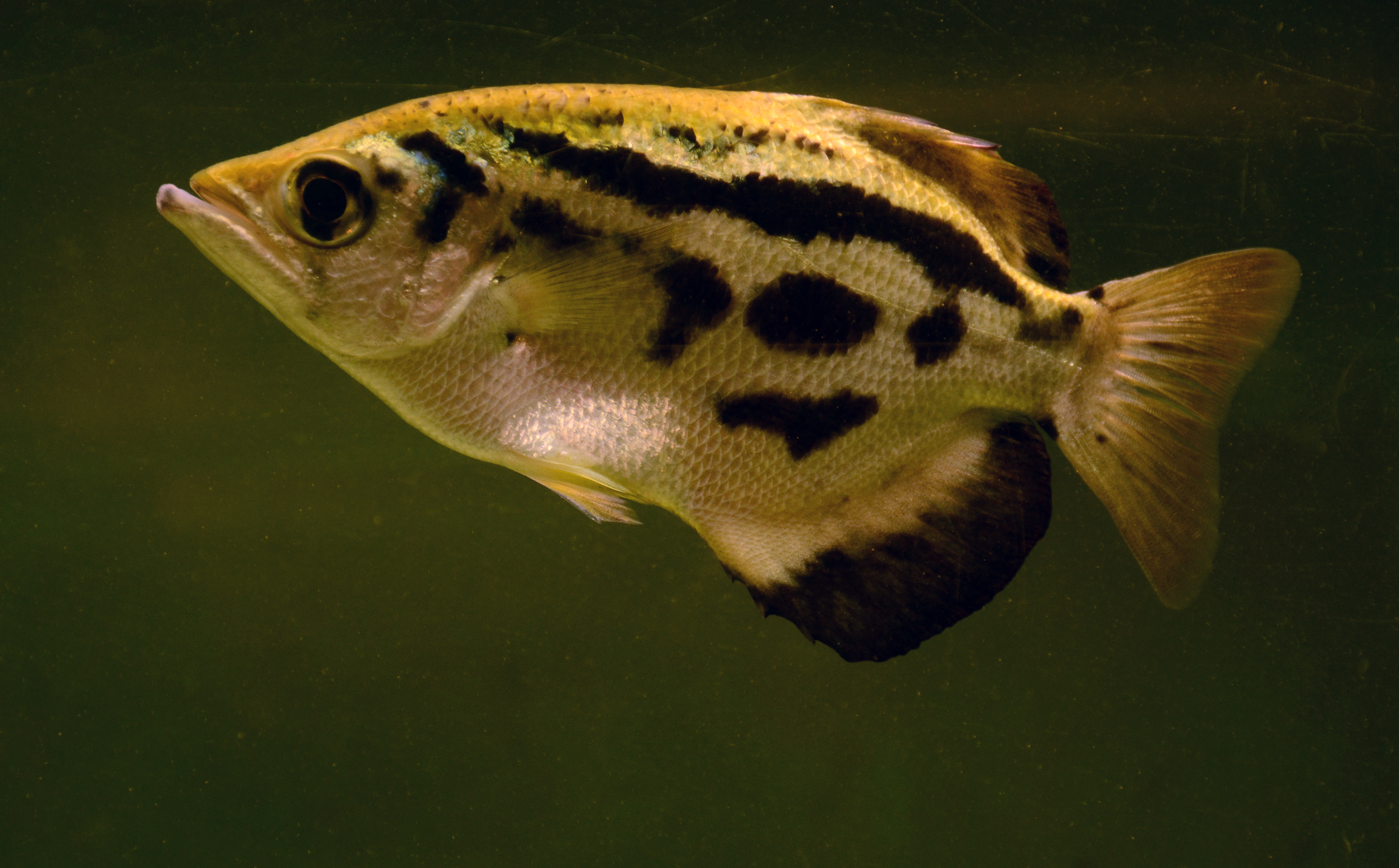

Conservation status
- Data Deficient (IUCN 3.1)

Scientific classification
- Kingdom: Animalia
- Phylum: Chordata
- Class: Actinopterygii
- Division: Teleostei
- Order: Carangiformes
- Family: Toxotidae
- Genus: Toxotes
- Species: T. blythii

Binomial name
- Toxotes blythii (Boulenger, 1892)

= Toxotes blythii =

Species of fish

Toxotes blythii, the clouded archerfish or zebra archerfish, is a perciform fish of genus Toxotes. It is found in rivers and estuaries in Myanmar, ranging from the lower Irrawaddy to the Tanintharyi Region, including lower Sittaung and Salween. Unlike some other archerfish, it is restricted to fresh water. This species was formerly thought to be identical to T. microlepis (smallscale archerfish). However, differences in structure and colouration caused the splitting of T. blythii into a new species. It is sometimes seen in the aquarium trade, but is generally rare.

== Description ==
For a while, Toxotes blythii was confused with Toxotes microlepis until key characteristics that separated them into different species were found. In Toxotes blythii, the depth of body is not half of the total length (without caudal tail), the fourth dorsal spine is about the same length as the third dorsal spine, and the third anal spine is the same length as the third dorsal spine, which is almost as long as the soft rays. Also, Toxotes blythii has irregular black spots that ran horizontally on the body and has a black spot sitting below its axilla. The archerfishes that possess the ability to shoot streams of water, such as Toxotes blythii, use a network of tubes within the roof of their mouth, along with a well grooved tongue, which aids in water shooting. Toxotes blythii has a metallic sheen across its body. While Toxotes microlepis has a body depth of one half of its total length without the caudal tail, its fourth dorsal spine is much longer than the third dorsal spine, the third anal spine is a little longer than the second dorsal spine, and the third anal spine is shorter than its soft rays. Not only that, but Toxotes microlepis has four vertical black spots on the dorsal region of the fish. The shape of the archerfish's spots can sometimes help distinguish different species. Toxotes blythii has a mouth that comes to a point, most likely to help with its ability to shoot water, as well as a homocercal tail. Syntypes of Toxotes blythii range from 61 to 131 mm in length. Archerfishes have ctenoid scales with 3-9 radii originating from the focus point to the anterior margin. Also, Toxotes blythii, has among the smallest scales of any archerfish. Even though there are few specimens of this species collected, there are many characteristics that distinguish Toxotes blythii from the other archerfishes.

== Development ==
Finding a clouded archerfish within its natural habitat can be quite the challenge and to make matters worse, this archerfish also has a high value in the market. With that said, other archerfishes, such as Toxotes microlepis, have been researched more and may provide some insight into the development of Toxotes blythii. As archer fishes get older their scales become longer and heavier, and as their scales become longer it is also seen that their standard length also increases. The gonads for the male species begins elongated with clear/red coloration then becomes larger with deep red coloration and at full maturity, they are pale red and dense. In female Toxotes microlepis, the gonads begin small, smooth, elongated, and pink; by the end of sexual maturity, they are shriveled with a yellow cloudy color before they are released. Archerfishes usually go through their developmental process between July and October.

== Behavior ==
One of the most well known behaviors of the archerfish is their ability to turn water into a projectile. Though it is thought that all archerfish are capable of this, it has only been definitively confirmed in three species, Toxotes jaculatrix, Toxotes chatareus and, Toxotes blythii. These species turn water into a projectile from the sudden compression of water from the pharynx into the palatine canal and use their tongue to control the flow. When groups of Toxotes chatareus are going for the same prey, some members will take the food that other fish shot down, more formally known as kleptoparasitism. Another fascinating aspect of these archerfish is how quickly they can learn and adjust the direction of their water projectiles to fit their needs at the time. By changing the direction of their water stream when they miss, their odds of hitting it next time will be better. Since archerfish shoot at their prey with water, they typically will reside near the surface of the habitat they are in.

== Food habits ==
Toxotes blythii and other archerfishes are relatively small fish, and their food is smaller than them. While more research needs to be done on Toxotes blythii and its diet, other species' diets are well known. Fully grown Toxotes chatareus and Toxotes jaxculatrix tend to eat small crabs, shrimps, and insects while their larvae eat phytoplankton and zooplankton. Toxotes chatareus and Toxotes jaxculatrix can be found in salt and brackish water. Since Toxotes blythii lives strictly in fresh water they will most likely not eat crabs and shrimp, but the possibility of insects is extremely high. The archer fish eating habits change over time to fit their physiological need. Even though there is no data about the food habits of Toxotes blythii it still gives clues to what types of food they eat.

== Predation ==
There are no significant organisms that prey on Toxotes blythii and other species of Toxotidae other than humans. These archerfishes have excellent eyesight and can swim very fast which can make them hard prey to catch. Other than their abilities these fish are often hidden within the root system in mangroves and foliage in their natural habitats, which adds to their ability to evade predators. These fishes are often preyed upon by humans as a source of food, usually the people that live near their habitat, and as aquarium fishes. Other than humans, the organisms that prey on Toxotes blythii are unknown.

== Ecosystem roles ==
While Toxotes blythii is not a huge predator animal in the food chain it is still a predator. The amount of Toxotes blythii present within an area can have an impact on the organisms they feed on, such as the terrestrial insects.

== Economic importance ==
Toxotes blythii has a positive effect on human economics. Even a 10 cm Toxotes blythii can be sold for a high price in Indonesia and the demand for this archerfish in the aquarium trade keeps it valuable. Toxotes blythii can also be used as a food source for the local people.
