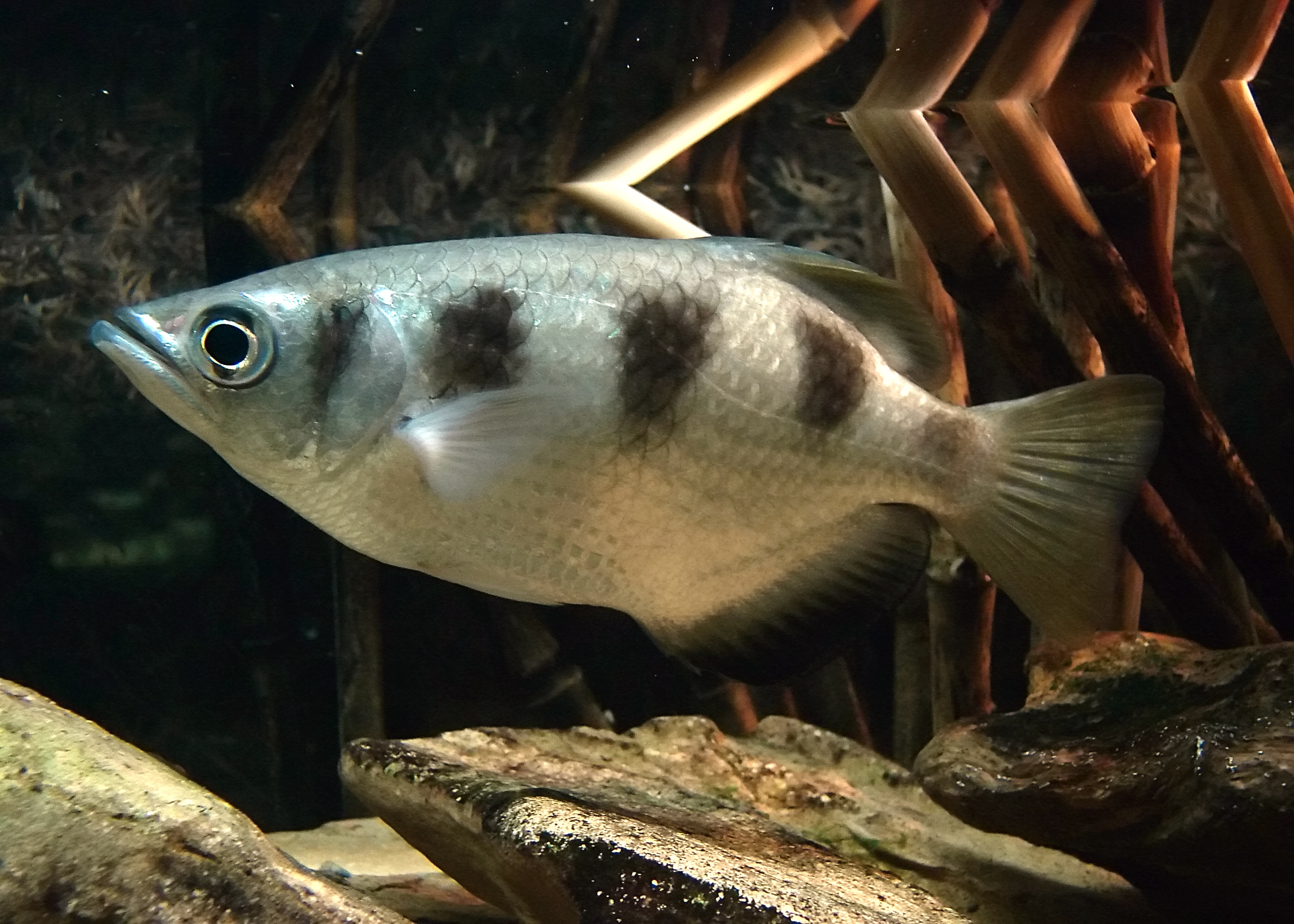

Conservation status
- Least Concern (IUCN 3.1)

Scientific classification
- Kingdom: Animalia
- Phylum: Chordata
- Class: Actinopterygii
- Order: Carangiformes
- Family: Toxotidae
- Genus: Toxotes
- Species: T. jaculatrix

Binomial name
- Toxotes jaculatrix (Pallas, 1767)

Synonyms
- Sciaena jaculatrix Pallas, 1767

= Banded archerfish =

Species of fish

The banded archerfish (Toxotes jaculatrix) is a perciform fish of the archerfish genus Toxotes. Found in brackish water, it is silvery in colour and has a dorsal fin towards the posterior end. It has distinctive, semi-triangular markings along its sides. It is best known for its ability to spit a jet of water to "shoot down" prey. Larger specimens may be able to hit prey 2 to 3 metres (6 ft 7 in to 9 ft 10 in) away. The banded archerfish may reach the displaced prey within 50 milliseconds of its hitting the water.

The name (binomial as well as common) refers to Sagittarius the archer, because of the unusual method banded archerfish use to capture prey. Banded archerfish are found in Indo-Pacific and Oceanian waters, generally in river mouths and mangrove estuaries. They move between fresh, salt, and brackish water over the course of their lifetime, though not to breed. Because of their markings and silvery colour, banded archerfish are sometimes kept as aquarium fish, though they are difficult to care for and not recommended for most home aquaria.

== Taxonomy and etymology ==
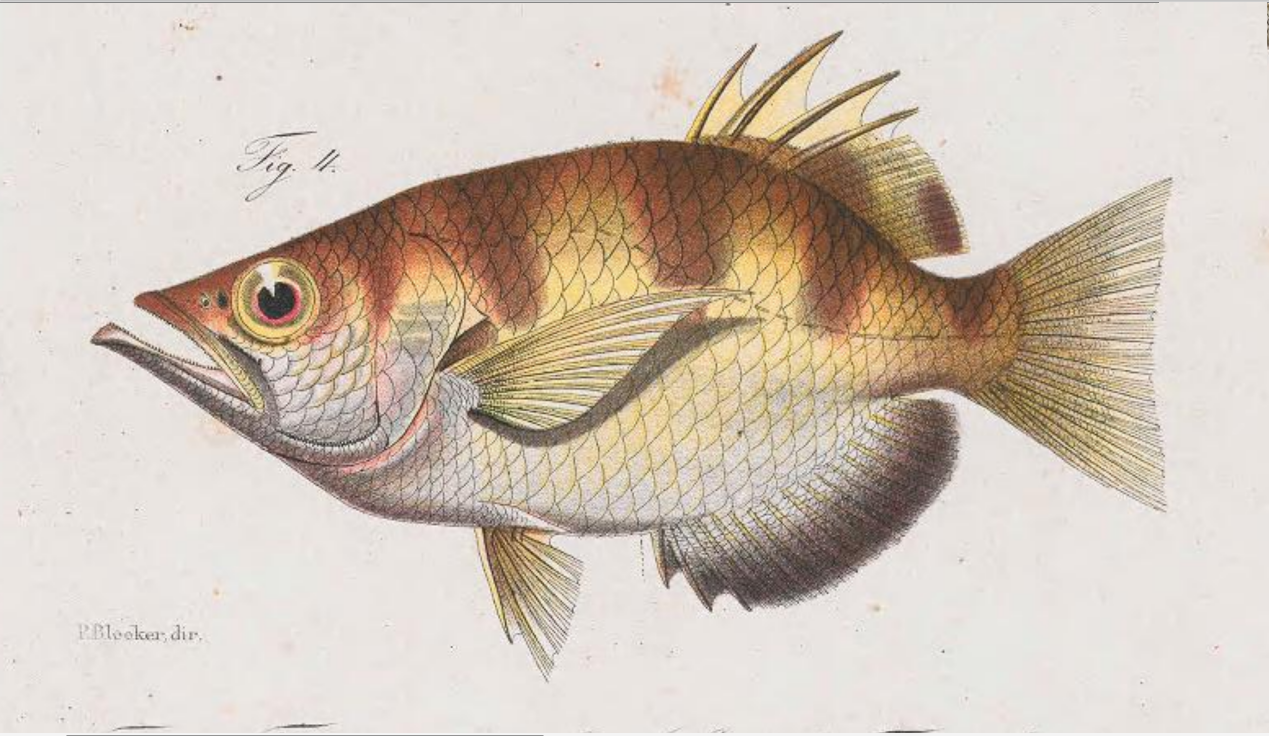
Banded archerfish, illustrated in Bleeker's 1878 Atlas Ichthyologique

Toxotes jaculatrix were originally described by Peter Simon Pallas in 1767. Since then, several synonyms (such as Labrus jaculatrix and Sciaena jaculatrix) and misspellings (Toxotes jaculator) have come into use.

Toxotes is Greek for "bowman" or "archer", and specifically refers to Sagittarius. The species name jaculatrix is related to the English jaculate and means "she who throws" or "she who casts" (of a dart or arrow). Both the common name and binomial name refer to the banded archerfish's habit of catching prey by shooting "arrows" of water through its mouth.

== Description ==
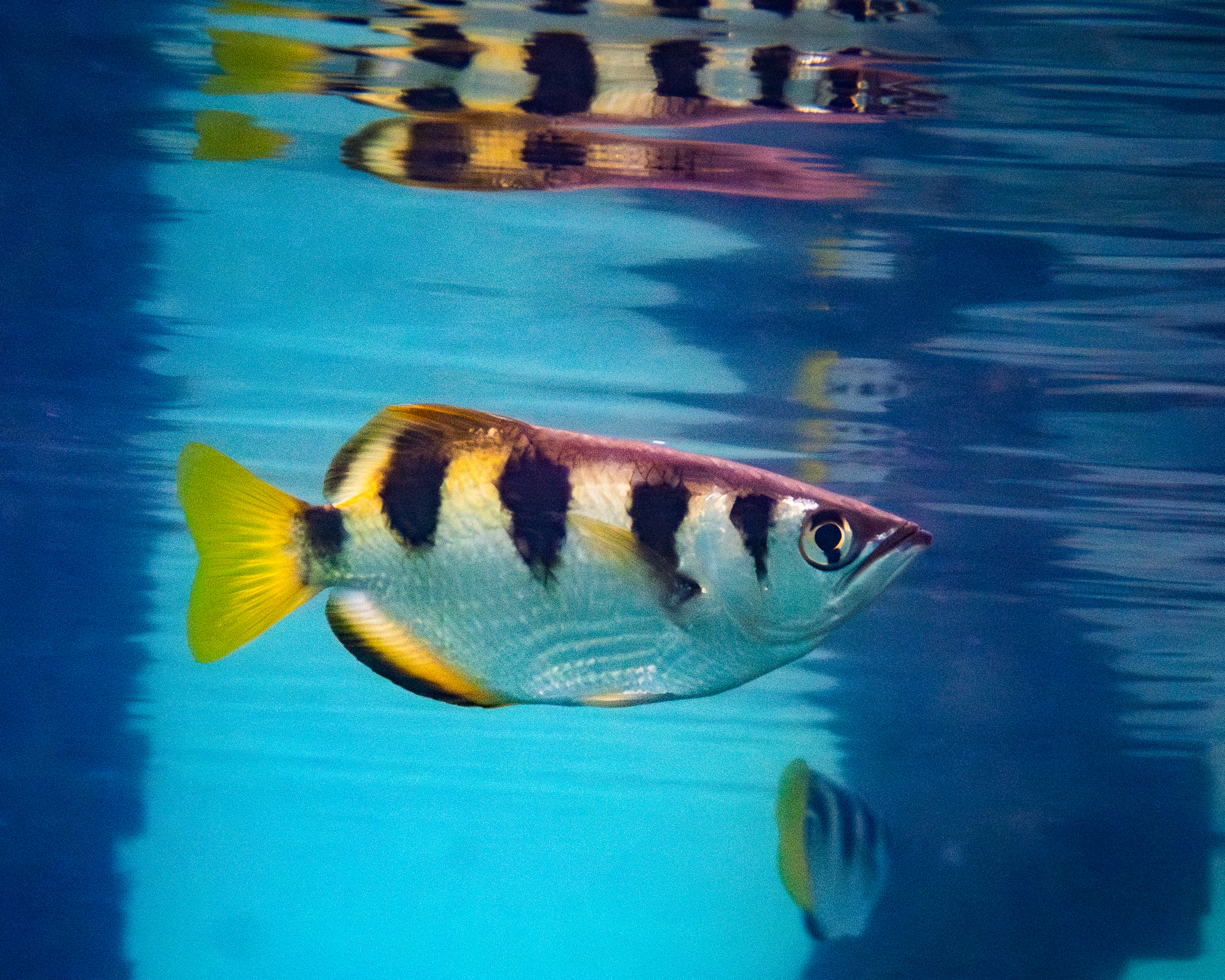
In the Philippines

Banded archerfish have four dorsal spines, 11 to 13 dorsal soft rays, three anal spines (of which the third is longest) and 15 to 17 anal soft rays. The first spine is always the shortest; the rays become shorter toward the posterior end. There are about 23 scales between the first dorsal spine and the posterior nostrils. Certain areas of the body are tinged green. The back of the fish is olive-green or brown. The dorsal fin is yellowish-green and located towards the posterior end, and its base is shorter than that of the anal fin. The caudal fin is "dirty green" and about the same height until the point of attachment, where it becomes shallower. The anal fin is silver.

The body of the banded archerfish is oblong in shape and raised on the posterior side. The body is generally silver-white in colour, though varying colourations, such as yellow, have been observed. Four to six broad black bars may be present on the dorsal side. The first bar is found anterior to the operculum, the bony plate covering the gills, and the second is found behind the operculum. The third bar is found below the origin of the dorsal fin, the fourth bar below the soft dorsal, and the fifth (if any) on the area between the anal fin and caudal fin (caudal peduncle). These bars become shorter as the fish ages. The lateral line curves upwards at the area between the fourth and ninth lateral scales. Banded archerfish can reach a maximum length of 30 centimetres (12 in); however, average length is about 20 centimetres (7.9 in).

Banded archerfish have large eyes, which, unlike many other fishes, are positioned for binocular vision. The head is slightly shorter than the body, with a distinctively pointed snout. Juveniles may be yellow-green to brown on the dorsal side and silvery on the ventral side. The juveniles' flanks are grey-green. Some banded archerfish have irregular yellow patches between their bands.

The possibility of sexual dimorphism in banded archerfish has not been investigated.

=== Comparison to other archerfish ===
The banded archerfish and its relative the largescale archerfish (Toxotes chatareus) are sometimes grouped and sold together under the label "archerfish". However, the banded archerfish has four dorsal spines whereas largescale archerfish has five. The banded archerfish usually has four to five wedge-shaped bands, but largescale archerfish has six or seven spots and shorter bands in a regular, alternating pattern. Unlike the silvery banded archerfish, the largescale is sooty in colour. The banded archerfish may also be confused with the smallscale archerfish, Toxotes microlepis. These are more difficult to distinguish, but the most striking difference is in the last two bands. While both species have four or five wedge-shaped bands, those of the banded archerfish extend to the dorsal fin, whereas those of the smallscale archerfish do not; there are two spots on the dorsal fin separate from the main bar.

== Behaviour ==
=== Diet and feeding ===
Banded archerfish are omnivorous. In the daytime, they come to the surface to feed on floating matter. Their diet comprises plant matter and insects, which they are able to "shoot down". Banded archerfish are also able to capture prey by jumping out of the water and seizing it from low overhanging branches. Young archerfish form small schools while learning aim, increasing the chance that at least one shot will hit the target. Their diet also comprises underwater prey, including crustaceans and small fishes.

=== Shooting ===
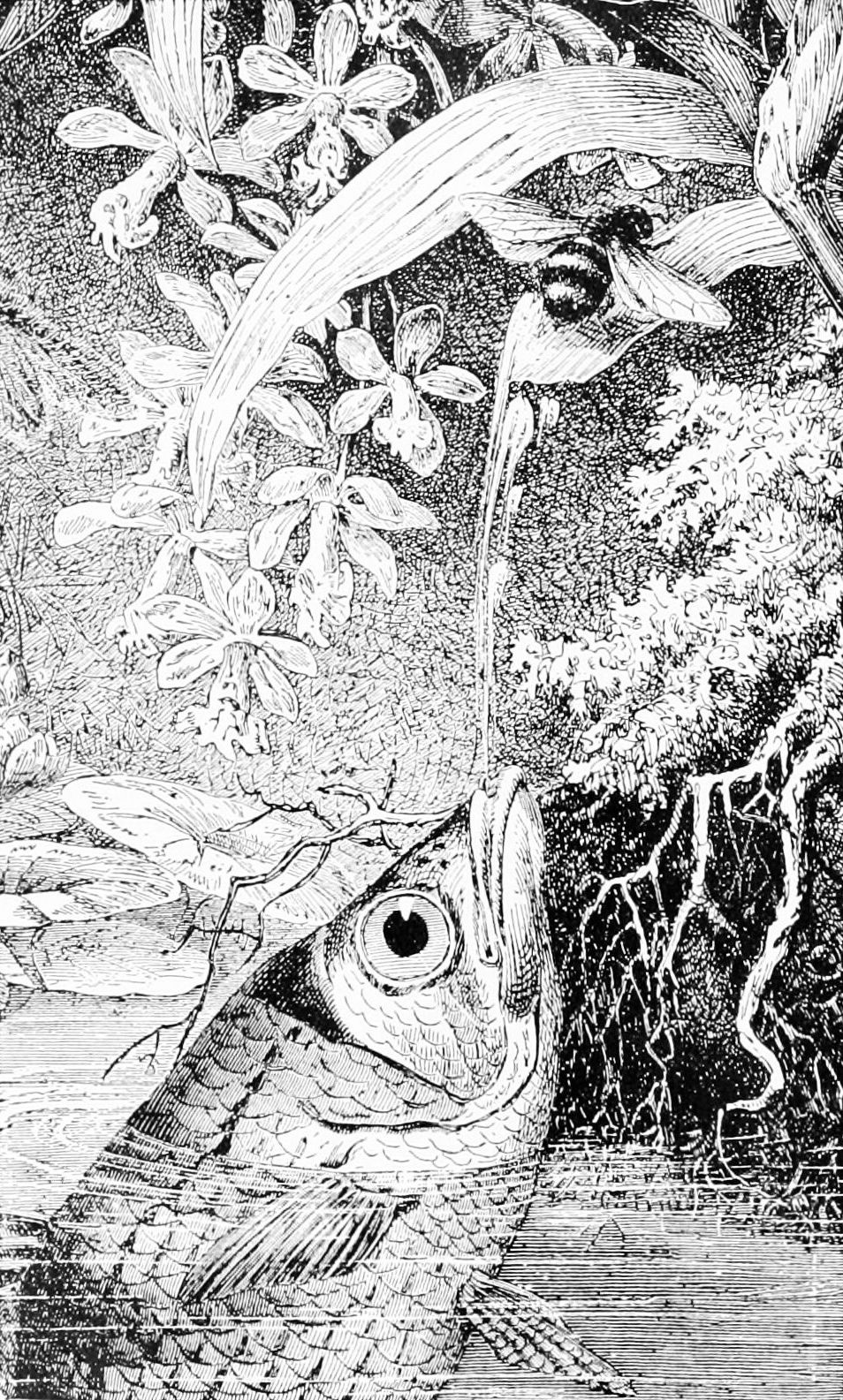
The banded archerfish shooting water at insects

Banded archerfish have mouths adapted to spit jets of water over distance, usually to knock prey into the water. The banded archerfish shoots the jet of water by raising its tongue against the roof of its mouth, forming a tube. The opercula then close quickly, pressurizing water along the tube. Most archerfish are able to spit at a range of 150 centimetres (59 in), though some larger specimens may be capable of ranges of up to 2 to 3 metres (6 ft 7 in to 9 ft 10 in). When a prey is shot down, the banded archerfish begins to move towards the place where it will land within 100 milliseconds and can reach it within 50 ms of its hitting the water.

A study found that banded archerfish could be trained to hit moving targets at an accuracy rate of greater than 50%. According to this study, the ability to hit moving targets is a complex learned behaviour, and can be learnt from other members of the school. The study concluded that fish could shoot more accurately after observing other members of the school shooting.

The banded archerfish is able to hit targets with a high degree of accuracy, despite refraction of light at the water-air interface. It was believed that they are able to achieve this level of accuracy by positioning their bodies to shoot from directly under the intended target. However, later studies have found that banded archerfish are able to achieve great accuracy even at angles, suggesting that they are somehow able to compensate for refraction. This may also suggest that banded archerfish are capable of three-dimensional tasks.

The shooting behaviour of the banded archerfish is affected by the presence of conspecifics (members of the same species). When conspecifics are visible, this archerfish usually takes longer to shoot, aims more often, and shoots from a closer distance. This is hypothesized to occur to decrease the possibility of kleptoparasitism occurring.

=== Breeding ===
The breeding habits of the banded archerfish are not well known. Banded archerfish first begin to breed when they are about 10 centimetres (3.9 in) long. The banded archerfish reproduces by spawning. There are reports that banded archerfish go to saltwater reefs to spawn, but these have not been confirmed. Archerfish lay 20,000 to 150,000 eggs at a time. Banded archerfish rarely breed in captivity.

== Distribution and habitat ==
The banded archerfish inhabits the Indo-Pacific and waters off northern Australia, and less frequently those on the southern coast of Australia. It can be found from India eastwards to the Philippine Islands, southwards to Australia, as well as in waters off the Solomon Islands and the Indonesian Archipelago. It has been observed as far east as the New Hebrides (now known as Vanuatu). The banded archerfish occurs mainly in areas of brackish water. Mangrove estuaries are its primary habitat, though it occasionally moves upstream into freshwater rivers. It is associated with reefs and has been reported to occur near overhanging vegetation. While they may move between fresh and salt water during their life cycle, they do not do so to breed.

== Relationship with humans ==
Banded archerfish are fairly common in the Indo-Pacific and are not currently endangered. They have a minor commercial role in fisheries and may be sold fresh in markets or collected for the aquarium trade. Population may face some decline through the destruction of their mangrove swamp habitat and by pollution.

=== In aquaria ===
Species in the genus Toxotes, including the banded archerfish, are kept as aquarium fish. In aquaria, the banded archerfish can grow up to 25 centimetres (9.8 in) long. They swim at the top level of the aquarium. Banded archerfish can be kept in small groups of three to five; fish of the same size get along but fish that are larger may be aggressive towards those that are smaller, and even try to eat them. They may live from five to eight years in captivity, and occasionally nine or ten. Banded archerfish need warm water, usually between 25 and 30 °C (77 and 86 °F). The aquarium should be large with middling amounts of plant growth and plenty of space for swimming. It should be at least 20 to 30 centimetres (7.9 to 11.8 in) deep.

Banded archerfish are generally not recommended for average home aquaria despite their attractive appearance because they are difficult to care for and require special conditions. Banded archerfish prefer to shoot and capture live food rather than be fed flake food, and are therefore difficult to feed. They need brackish water as well as a tall canopy. In the wild they are able to jump out of the water to capture prey on overhanging branches; a tall canopy is required to prevent their jumping out of the aquarium. Banded archerfish should be kept in an aquarium with a volume of at least 45 to 55 US gallons (170 to 210 L; 37 to 46 imp gal), though a greater volume is preferred. Because of such difficulties in caring for banded archerfish, the species has not yet been successful bred in captivity.

== See also ==
- Big scale archerfish (Toxotes oligolepis), also known as the Western archerfish
- List of brackish aquarium fish species
