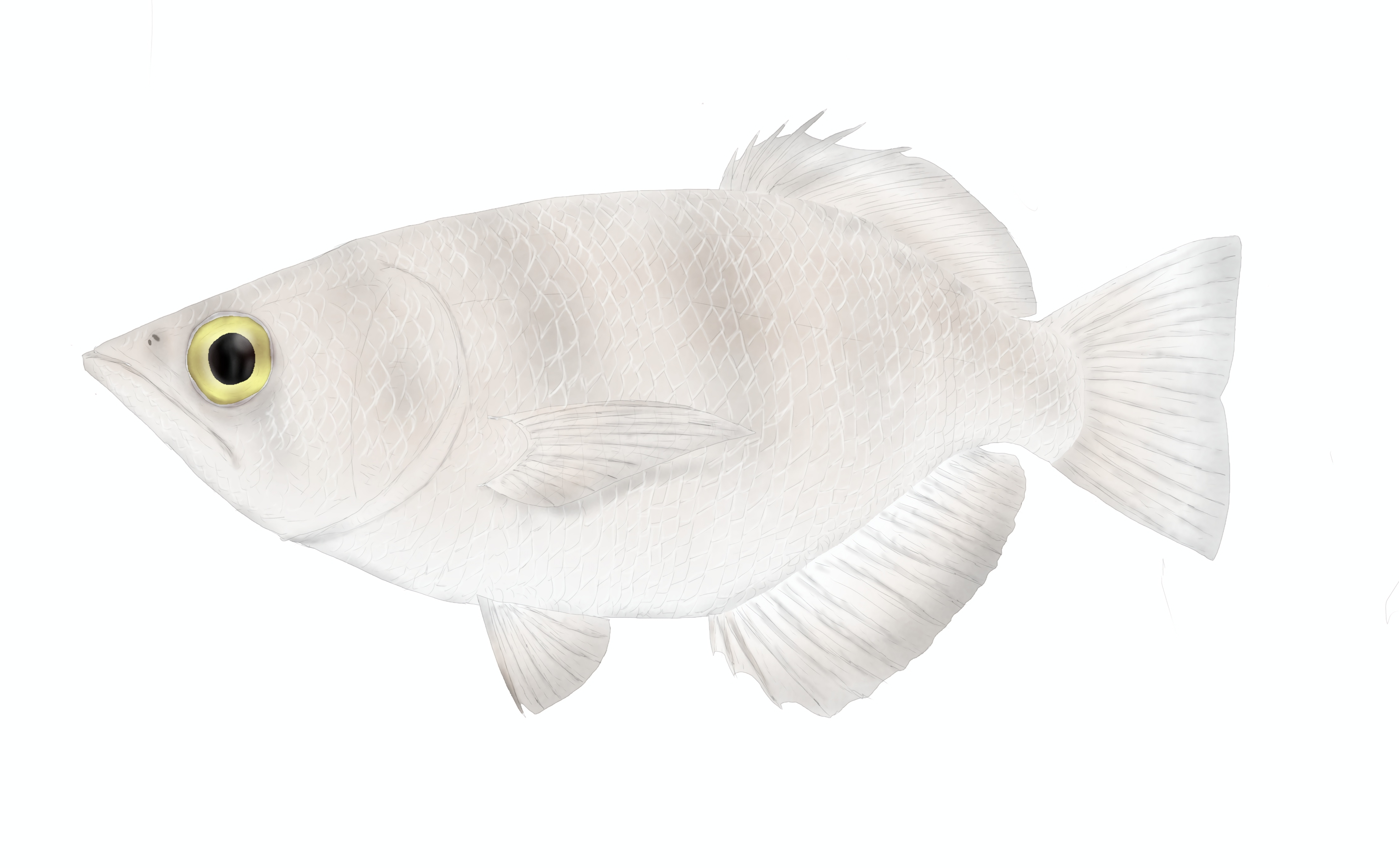

Scientific classification
- Kingdom: Animalia
- Phylum: Chordata
- Class: Actinopterygii
- Order: Carangiformes
- Family: Toxotidae
- Genus: Toxotes
- Species: †T. beauforti

Binomial name
- †Toxotes beauforti Sanders, 1934

= Toxotes beauforti =

Toxotes beauforti Temporal range: Tertiary

Extinct species of fish

Toxotes beauforti is a species of fossil archerfish that lived during early Tertiary (presumably Eocene). It was described by Sanders (1934) from an articulated fossil found in Sangkarewang Formation, Sumatra, Indonesia. Its overall shape is said to be very similar to modern species except T. beauforti have six dorsal spines. For comparison, extant archerfish usually have only four or five dorsal spines.
