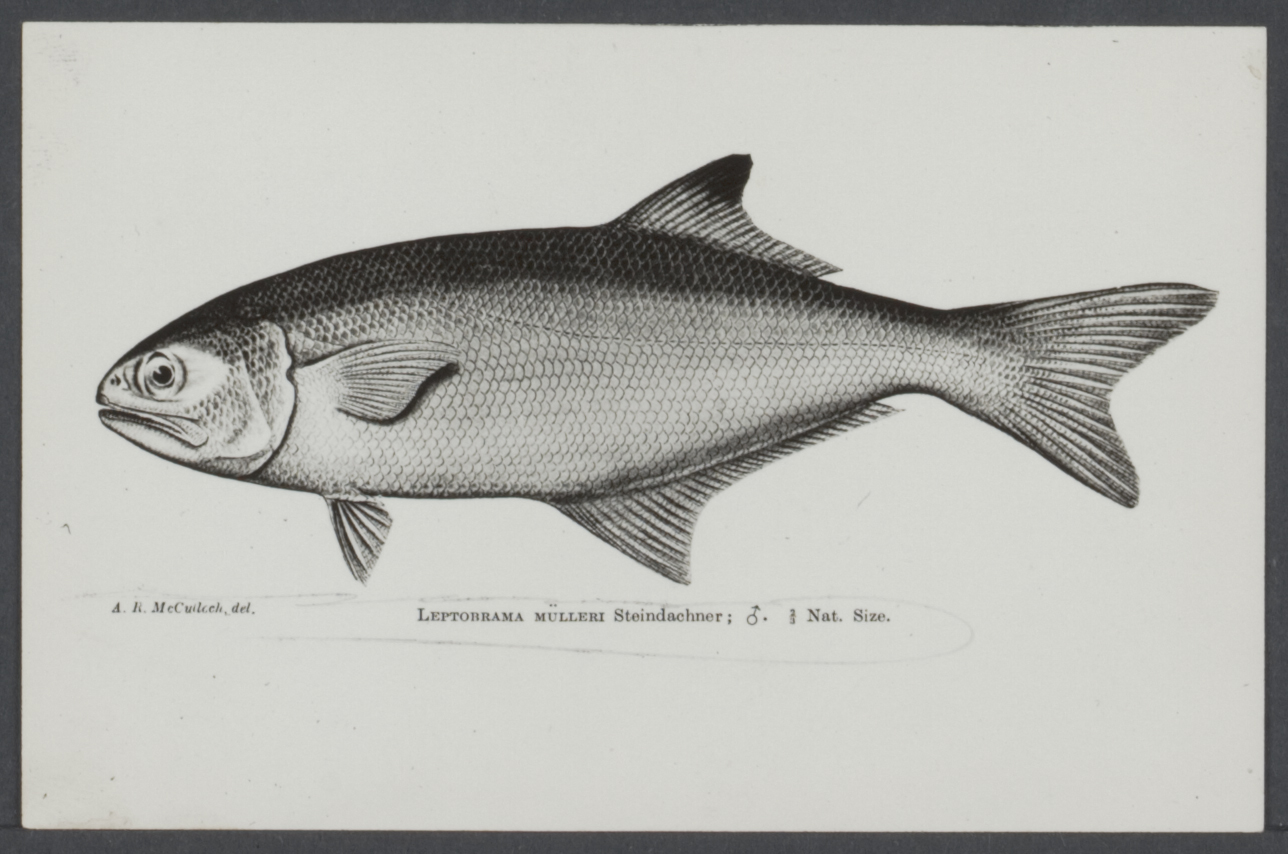

Scientific classification
- Kingdom: Animalia
- Phylum: Chordata
- Class: Actinopterygii
- Division: Teleostei
- Order: Carangiformes
- Family: Leptobramidae
- Genus: Leptobrama
- Species: L. muelleri

Binomial name
- Leptobrama muelleri Steindachner, 1878

Synonyms
- Neopempheris ramsayi Macleay, 1881

= Spot-fin beachsalmon =

Species of ray-finned fish

Leptobrama muelleri, also known as the spot-fin beachsalmon, is a species of coastal marine and brackish water ray-finned fish belonging to the order Carangiformes. It is found in tropical coastal waters of the Western Pacific off southern New Guinea, Queensland and Western Australia. The beachsalmon is a popular sport fish in Australia, where it is sometimes called "flat salmon", "silver salmon", "slender bream" or "skippy" (a name also applied to several species of trevallies).

Historically, Leptobrama was placed in the sweeper family Pempheridae; while the two are similar, they have no more characteristics in common than "any other two arbitrarily chosen acanthopterygian forms might be expected to have," therefore justifying the placement of Leptobrama in its own family. The genus name Leptobrama may be translated from the Greek leptos, meaning "thin" and the Old French bresme, meaning "breme" or "freshwater fish", an allusion to its tendency to enter the mouths of rivers and estuaries.

== Description ==
This species is characterized by a deep, laterally compressed, and fusiform body. The dorsal fin is also reduced and begins behind the middle of the body; it contains four spines and 16-18 soft rays. The anal fin originates at about the middle of the body and contains three spines and 26-30 soft rays. The maxilla extend well beyond the small eyes; the preorbital is serrated, and the adipose lid is present.

The lateral line is described as having long, narrow tubes and from 75 to 77 scales. It has about 10 short gill rakers. The maximum recorded standard length for the species is 37.5 cm (14.8 in).
