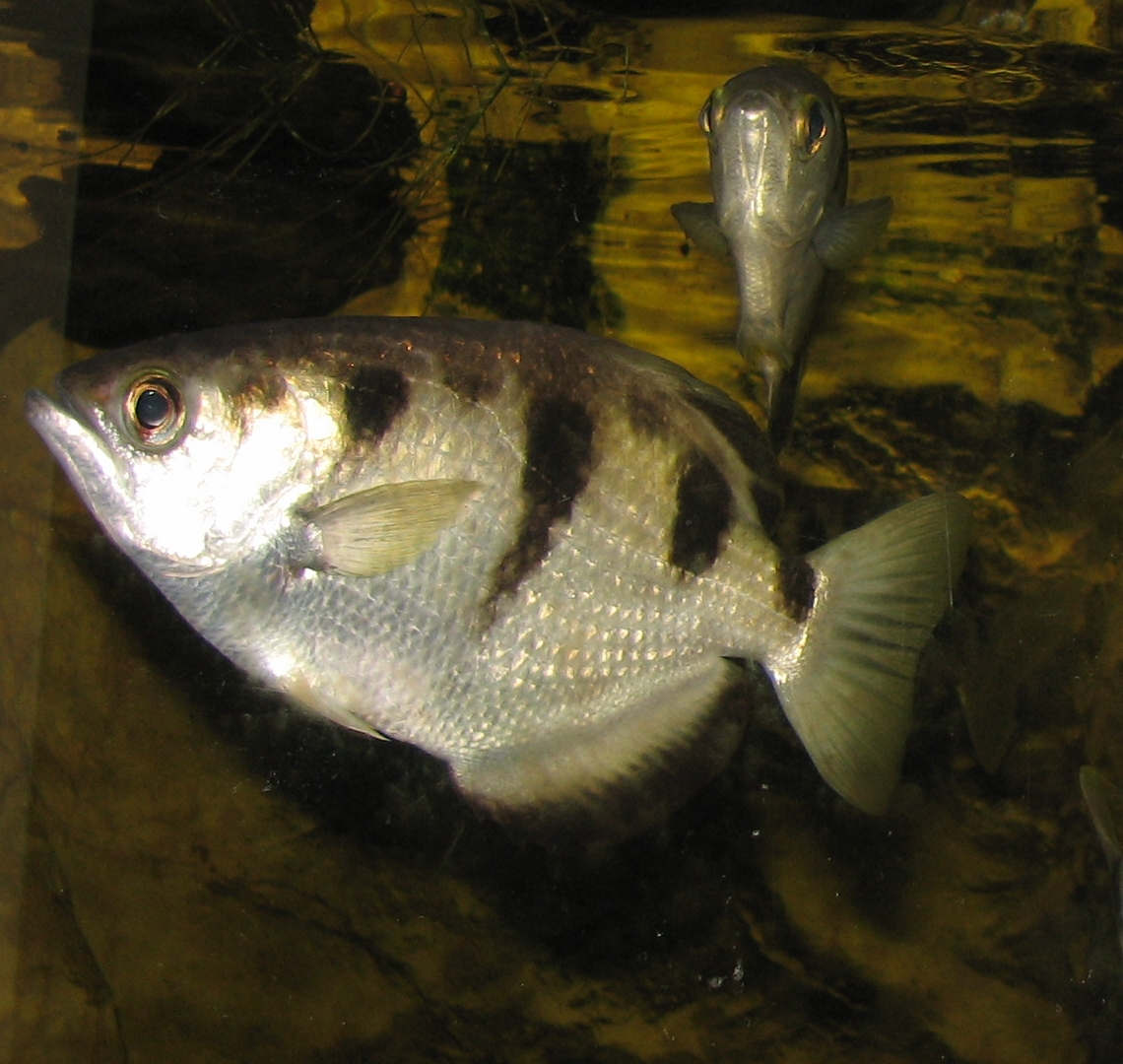
- Toxotes jaculatrix

Scientific classification
- Kingdom: Animalia
- Phylum: Chordata
- Class: Actinopterygii
- Order: Carangiformes
- Family: Toxotidae
- Genus: Toxotes; Cloquet, 1816

Species
- See text

= Toxotes (fish) =

Toxotes Temporal range: Eocene–present

Genus of fishes

Toxotes is a genus of archerfish found in tropical Asia and northern Australasia. It contains a majority of species in the family, and was previously thought to be the only genus of archerfish until the genus Protoxotes was revived and split from this genus in 2022.

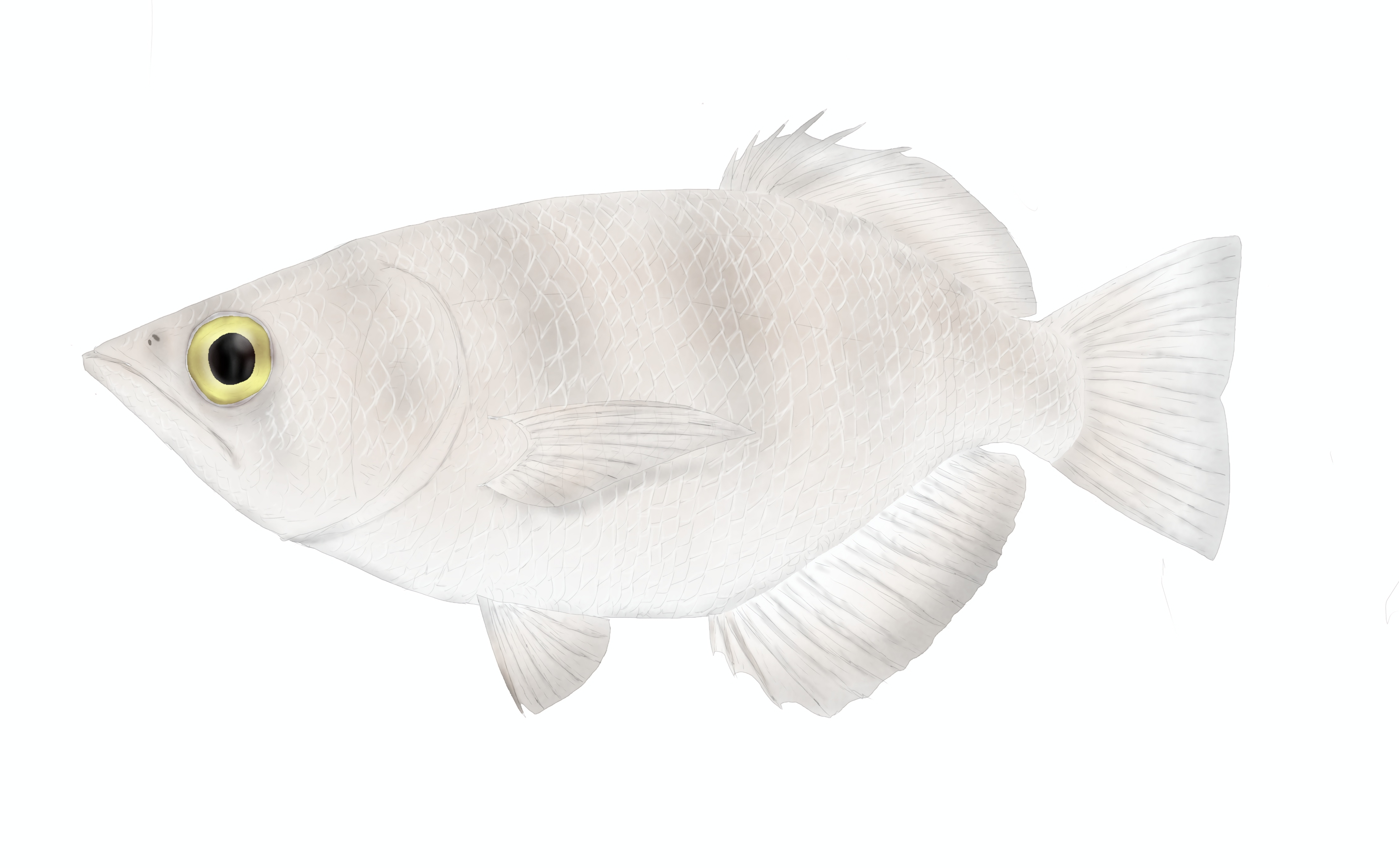
Life restoration of the extinct Toxotes beauforti

The following species are placed in this genus:

- †Toxotes beauforti Sanders, 1934 (fossil; Eocene of Sumatra, Indonesia)
- Toxotes blythii Boulenger, 1892 - clouded archerfish, zebra archerfish
- Toxotes carpentariensis Castelnau, 1878
- Toxotes chatareus (Hamilton, 1822) - largescale archerfish, common archerfish
- Toxotes jaculatrix (Pallas, 1767) - banded archerfish
- Toxotes kimberleyensis Allen, 2004 - Kimberley archerfish, western archerfish
- Toxotes microlepis Günther, 1860 - smallscale archerfish
- Toxotes oligolepis Bleeker, 1876 - big scale archerfish
- Toxotes sundaicus Kottelat & Tan, 2018
