= Projectile use by non-human organisms =

Non-human use of projectiles

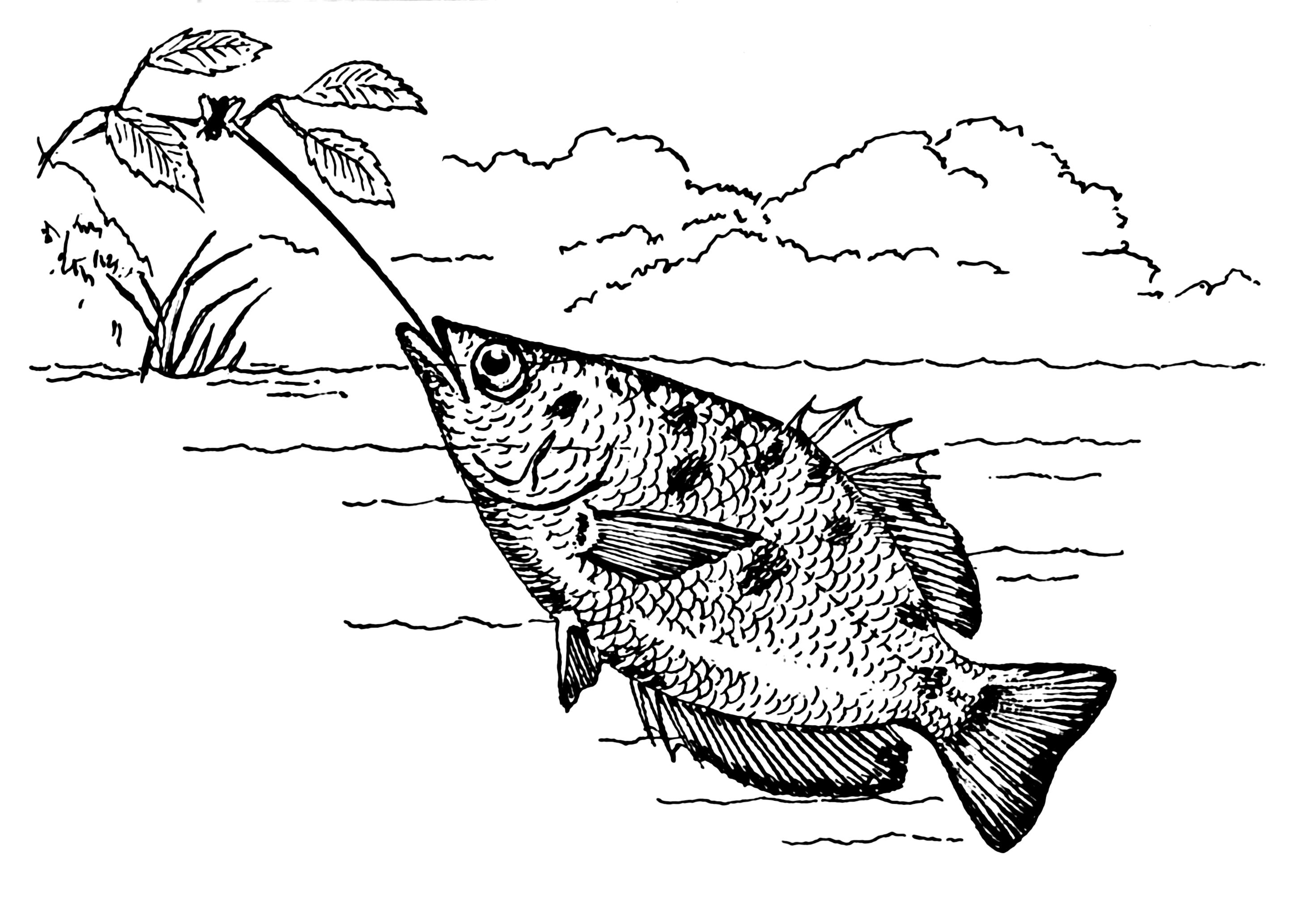
Illustration of an archerfish shooting water at an insect on a hanging branch.

Although projectiles are commonly used in human conflict, projectile use by organisms other than humans is relatively rare. However, some organisms are capable of using various different types of projectiles for defense or predation.

Some invertebrates are able to spit or squirt out fluids and some vertebrates also use liquid projectiles. Solid projectiles are used by various species. Tarantulas, for example, may kick off barbed hairs and several mammals have been observed to throw objects such as sand, rocks, sticks and feces. Chameleons, frogs and some salamanders have tongues that act like tethered projectiles. The pistol shrimp may emit a powerful wave of bubbles. Some plants produce seed pods that explode when touched or may fire spore capsules.

== Animals ==
=== Liquid projectiles ===
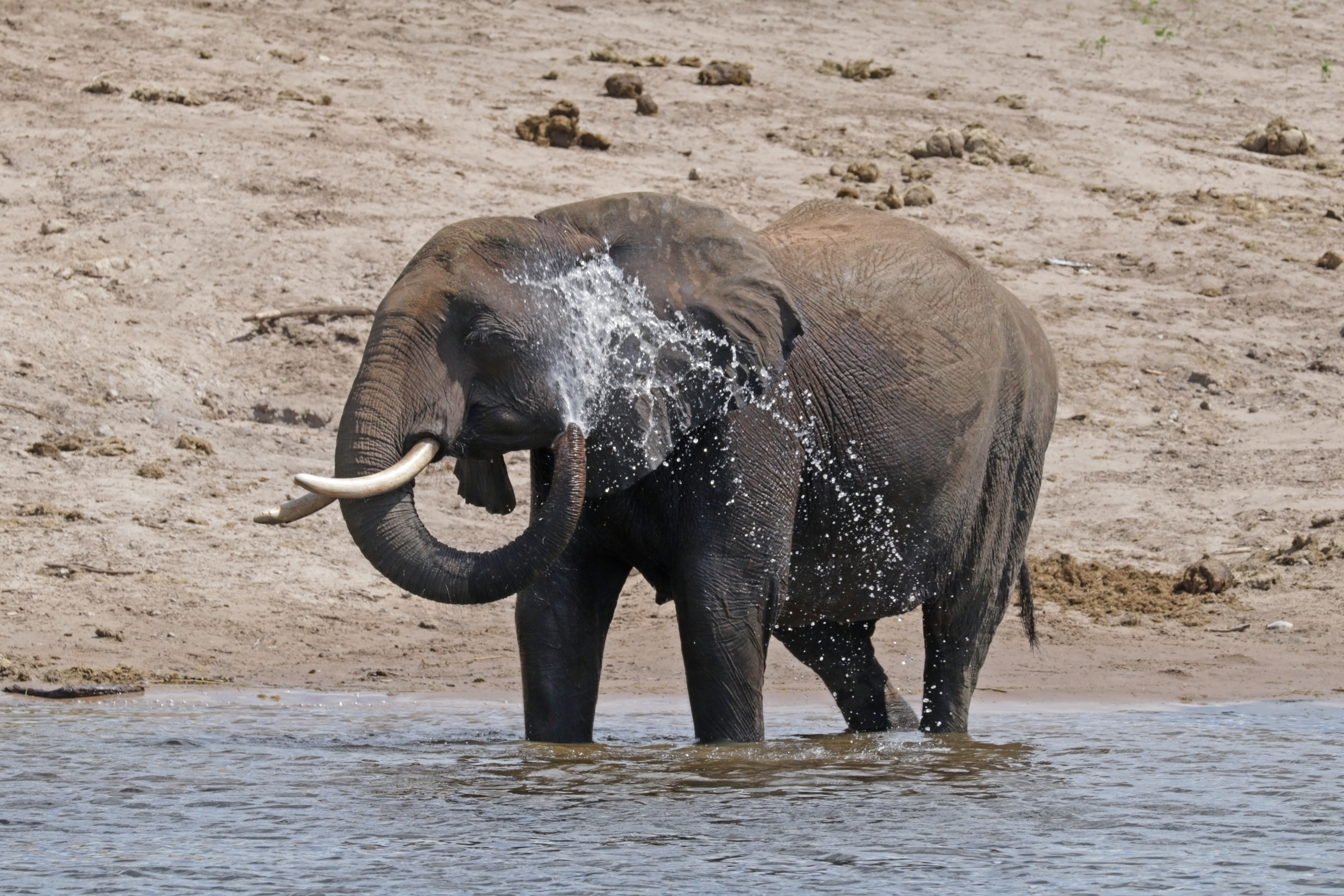
An African elephant spraying water

Most projectiles used by terrestrial animals are liquids. Among invertebrates there are a number of examples. Velvet worms can squirt out a slimy adhesive fluid from glands on the sides of their head, and use it to trap their prey. The spitting spiders Scytodes can spit a venomous sticky fluid that traps its victims and also poisons them. The bombardier beetle is unusual by using a violent exothermic chemical reaction to launch a boiling noxious chemical spray in a rapid burst of pulses from special glands in its abdomen, accompanied with a popping sound. The Anthia (oogpister beetle) will fire formic acid at attackers, probably extracting the formic acid from the ants that it eats. The devil-rider stick insects (Anisomorpha) can fire terpenes from glands on the metathorax that can cause an intense burning irritation of the eyes and mouth of potential predators. Some species of ants of the subfamily Formicinae, like wood ants and weaver ants, will spray acid at attackers. They will bite to cause a wound and spray acid directly into the wound. A type of planthopper of Madagascar is able to flick small balls of honeydew, this attracts day geckos that feed on the honeydew and whose presence may deter predators from approaching the sap-sucking insect. Termites of the subfamily Nasutitermitinae can project a sticky fluid from a nozzle on their heads. They can use this fontanellar gun accurately, over a range of many centimeters, even though the termite is blind, possibly using auditory or olfactory cues instead.

A number of vertebrates also use liquid projectiles. The archerfish will squirt water from its mouth to dislodge invertebrates from overhanging branches. Some diptodactyline geckos can fire a black or pale yellow sticky fluid out of glands in their tail for a distance of about a meter, and with good aim. This fluid has a musky unpleasant odour and although it is not toxic it may discourage predators, in particular the big arthropods that prey on these geckos. Some species of horned lizards (Phrynosoma) can fire an aimed stream of blood from the corners of the eyes for a distance up to 3 ft to deter predators. The spitting cobra can squirt venom from forward-facing holes in its fangs. It aims for its victim's eyes, spitting up to 1.5 meters (5 ft). The venom may cause blindness. The Mangshan pitviper is also reported to spit venom.

A bird that uses liquid projectiles in defense is the southern giant petrel which produces a stomach oil made up of wax esters and triglycerides that are stored in the proventriculus and can be projectile vomited on predators. Other petrels such as the fulmar can also squirt oils from their mouths as a defense. They can squirt oils with accuracy up to a distance of 1 to 2 meters (3.5 to 6.5 ft). The oil mats the feathers of birds together and destroys their waterproofing abilities, so oiled birds may die from chilling or drowning, although fulmars seem able to remove the oil from themselves by preening. Birds ranging from gulls to sea-eagles have died after being squirted by fulmars. Some species of penguin expel liquid feces in a projectile manner, to a distance of up to about 50 cm (20 in). They are believed to do this because during the brooding season, when penguins are sitting on their nests, they avoid leaving their nests and thereby leaving their eggs open to predation and thus to maintain a clean nest they evolved the ability to project their feces.

Among mammals, skunks can eject a noxious fluid from their anal glands. It is not only foul smelling, but can cause skin irritation and, if it gets in the eyes, temporary blindness. When it feels threatened a camel will bring up their stomach contents, along with saliva, and project it out towards the threat to distract, surprise, or bother the threat.

=== Solid projectiles ===
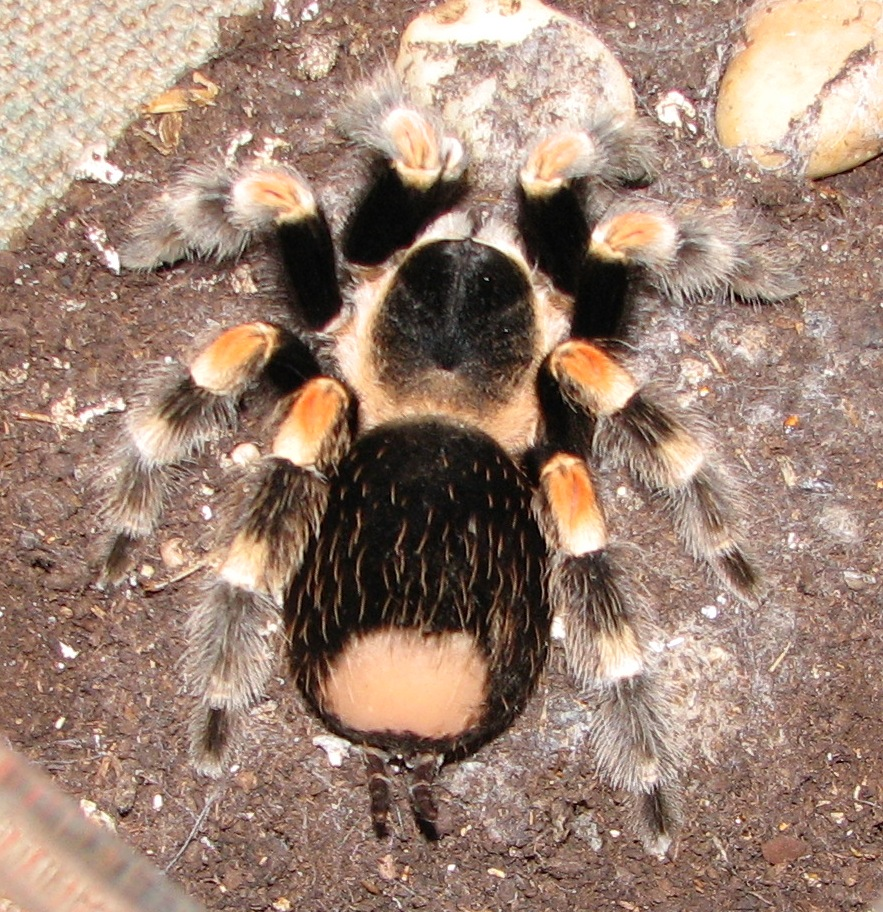
Adult female Brachypelma smithi, showing a bald patch after kicking hairs off her abdomen.

Some New World tarantulas have a dense covering of hairs called urticating hairs on the abdomen that they sometimes use as protection against enemies. Species with urticating hairs can kick these hairs off; they are flicked into the air at a target using their back pairs of legs. These fine hairs are barbed and designed to irritate and can be lethal to small animals such as rodents. The symptoms range from a burning itch to a minor rash, from being lethal to simply being a deterrent. With humans, they can cause irritation to the eyes, nose, and skin, and more dangerously, the lungs and airways, if inhaled. In some cases, tarantula hairs have caused permanent damage to human eyes. Urticating hairs do not grow back, but are replaced with each moult. Another invertebrate, the antlion, also makes use of solid projectiles. The antlion lies at the bottom of a sloping pit that it digs in the sand. Small prey slip into the pit on the loose substrate. If the prey crawls up the slopes of the pit, the antlion throws sand at the prey, which may dislodge it and send it back down the pit. In gastropods, cone snails have modified radula tooth which is stored in the radular sac and at the end of proboscis, acting like a harpoon. Their "harpoon" is venomous (in some species lethal to humans), which assists cone snail to paralyze or kill the prey before eating it.

A number of vertebrate species also make use of solid projectiles. Among birds the hornbill uses projectile motion to eat food. The hornbill's beak typically only contacts at the tip, and it has a short tongue. To swallow food the hornbill instead throws the food from the tip of its long bill backwards into the throat. One example of solid projectile use among mammals is the California ground squirrel, which is known to distract predators such as the rattlesnake and gopher snake from locating their nest burrows by kicking sand into their eyes. A wild female African elephant has also been observed to throw various materials at an interfering rhino. Orcas have been observed to throw seal prey using their tail flukes in apparent play behavior. Some primates can throw objects such as rocks, sticks, and feces as projectiles. Non-human primates that are known to throw are bonobos, chimpanzees, gorillas, orangutans, capuchins, certain gibbons and perhaps some baboons and Japanese macaques (although not rhesus macaques). A chimpanzee named Santino in a Swedish zoo was observed to stockpile stones to be used as missiles against visitors.

=== Tethered projectiles ===
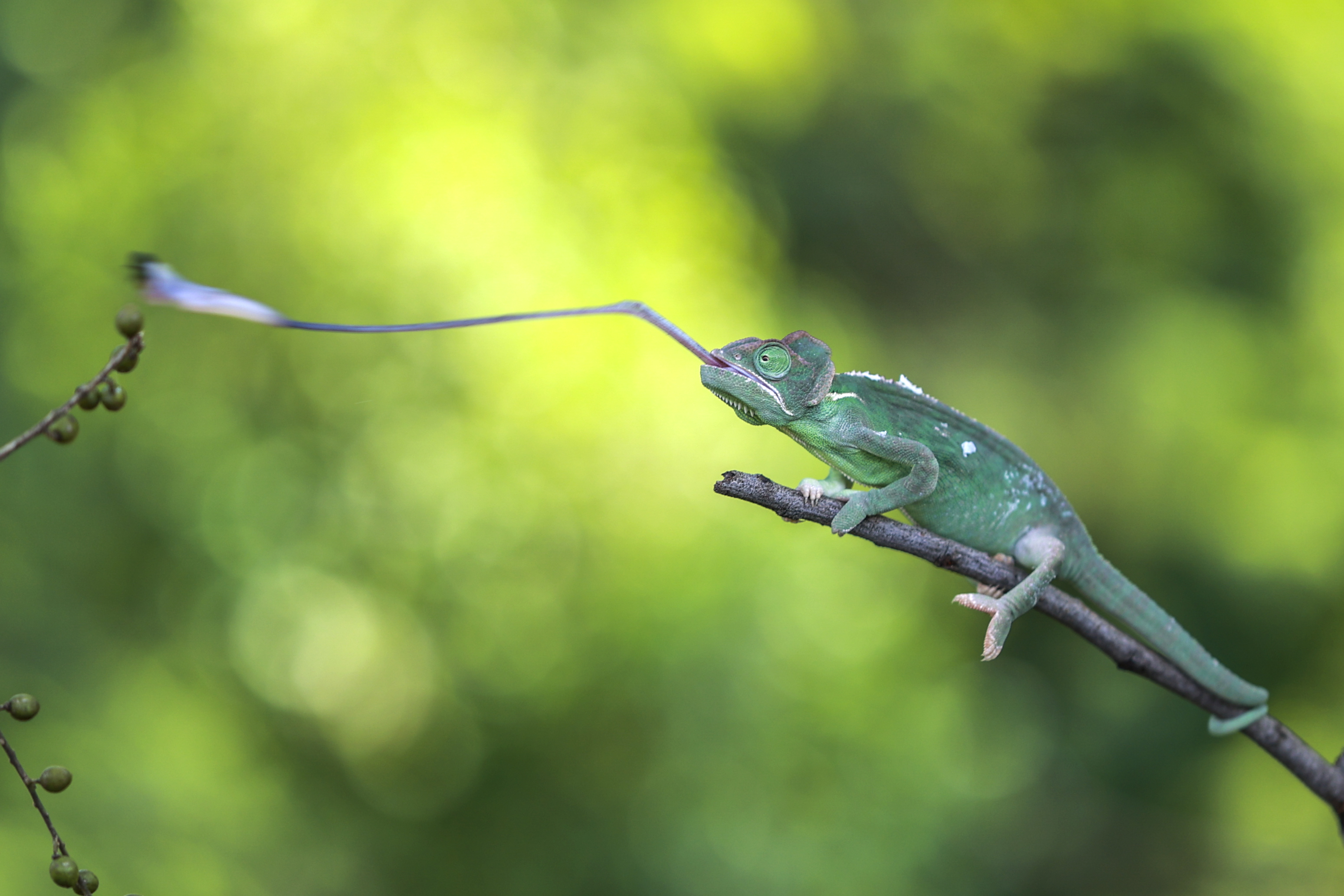
A chameleon launching its tongue at its prey

Chameleons, frogs and some lungless salamanders have tongues that act like a tethered projectile. In frogs, the tongue is attached at the front of the mouth and rotates about this attachment as it flips out (thus the top of the tongue at rest becomes the bottom when extended). In chameleons, the tongue contracts against a tapered hyoid bone, eventually slipping off and projecting forward at very high speed. Lungless salamanders use a similar method, however, both the tongue and underlying hyoid bone project (in contrast to chameleons, whose hyoid remains fixed while the fleshy portion of the tongue projects). In both salamanders and chameleons, the movement is too fast and requires too much mechanical power for muscle alone to provide – instead, muscles slowly pre-load elastic elements such as connective tissue, which can then recoil and release the stored energy at a much higher rate. In order to retract their tongues over such great distances, the tongue muscles of chameleons have perforated Z-disks, allowing each sarcomere to shorten far greater distances than those of other vertebrates.

=== Bubbles ===
The pistol shrimp claw has a pistol-like feature made of two parts. A joint allows the "hammer" part to move backward into a right-angled position. When released, it snaps into the other part of the claw, emitting an enormously powerful wave of bubbles capable of stunning larger fish and breaking glass.

== Plants and fungi ==
The seed pods of the orange jewelweed have projectile seeds that, if ripe, explode out of the pods when they are lightly touched. The seed pods of the scotch broom also burst open, often with an audible crack, projecting the seeds from the parent plant. Similarly, the fruit of the sandbox tree burst open to disperse seeds, but the reaction is so violent that it can injure nearby people or livestock. Some plants such as the dogwood bunchberry and white mulberry will also fling pollen from their flowers. Peat mosses are known to explosively launch their spores.

Hat-throwing fungi fire their spore capsules up to 2 meters (6.5 ft), and the cannonball fungi of the genus Sphaerobolus, such as S. stellatus, the artillery fungus can throw sticky spore sacs up to 6 meters (20 ft) horizontally. This species is phototropic, and propels spores towards the nearest source of direct or reflected light, like the sides of brightly colored houses.
