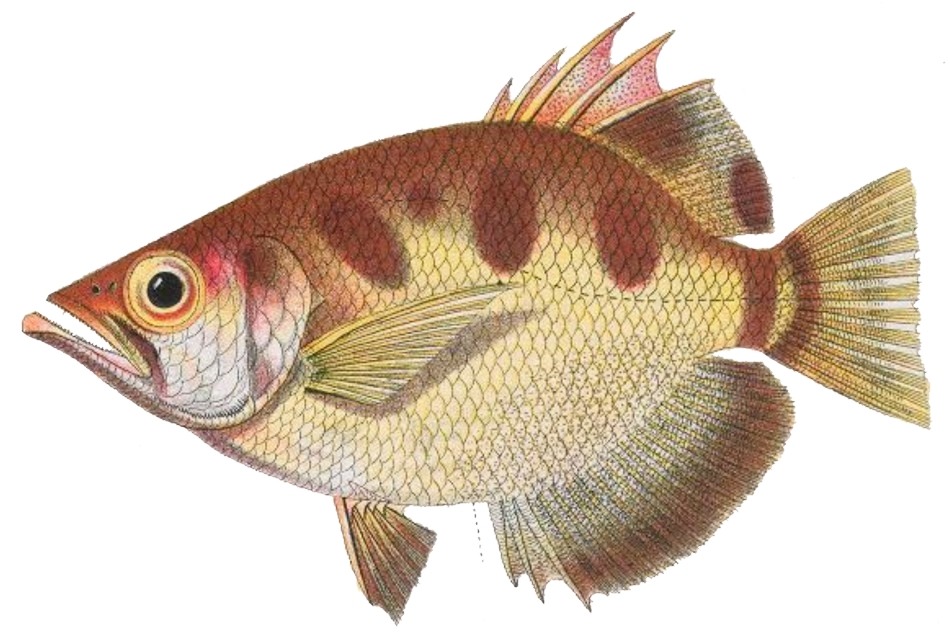
- Illustration from Pieter Bleeker's Atlas Ichthyologique 1878

Conservation status
- Least Concern (IUCN 3.1)

Scientific classification
- Kingdom: Animalia
- Phylum: Chordata
- Class: Actinopterygii
- Order: Carangiformes
- Family: Toxotidae
- Genus: Toxotes
- Species: T. microlepis

Binomial name
- Toxotes microlepis (Günther, 1860)

= Smallscale archerfish =

Species of fish

The smallscale archerfish (Toxotes microlepis) is a perciform fish of genus Toxotes. As its name suggests, the scales of the smallscale archerfish are smaller than those of other archerfish. They reach a maximum length of 15 centimetres (5.9 in). Smallscale archerfish live in the tropical Indo-Pacific region and are potamodromous, moving between fresh and brackish water through their lifetimes.

== Description ==
Smallscale archerfish have a pointed snout and large eyes. The back is flat and the belly is curved. There is only one dorsal fin, with four to five dorsal spines. The fourth spine is longer than the third. The second dorsal spine is slightly shorter than the third anal spine, which itself is shorter than the soft rays. There are usually 40 to 42 lateral line scales, though some specimens found in the Mekong had 34 to 37. The species T. blythii was formerly thought to be identical to T. microlepis. Differences in structure and colouration caused the splitting of T. blythii into a new species.

Like other archerfish, they have dark, wedge-shaped bands or spots on their flanks, which can be yellow to silvery. They reach a maximum length of 15 centimetres (5.9 in) in the wild, and 12 centimetres (4.7 in) in captivity. The smallscale archerfish is sometimes confused with the banded archerfish, T. jaculatrix. Both species have four or five wedge-shaped bars on their flanks. However, the bars of banded archerfish extend to the dorsal fin whilst those of the smallscale archerfish do not; they stop below the dorsal fin, with another dark spot on the fin itself. The smallscale also has a shorter snout than other archerfish.

== Diet ==
Smallscale archerfish eat terrestrial insects (which they can shoot down), zooplankton, crustaceans, and insect larvae.

== Distribution and habitat ==
Smallscale archerfish inhabit large rivers and estuaries in Asia and the Indo-Pacific. They are distributed throughout the Mekong and Chao Phraya river basins as well as waters off the Malay Peninsula, Sumatra and Borneo. They can be found near the shores of moving and standing waters, usually with overhanging plants. The smallscale archerfish is described as a "freshwater archerfish", as it does not move into saltwater during its life as do some other archerfish. It is found upstream from the estuary more often than other species of the genus.

== Taxonomy ==
The populations of archerfish assigned to the smallscale archerfish that occur in the rivers of southeast Asia were found to be three different species by work published in 2018, this has not yet been reflected in Fishbase. The new species are Toxotes mekongensis from the Mekong, Toxotes siamensis from the Chao Phraya and Toxotes sundaicus from Borneo, Sumatra and possibly the Malay Peninsula. This same study found that Toxotes microlepis is a synonym of Toxotes blythii.

== Relationship to humans ==
Some aquarists believe the smallscale archerfish is the most frequently traded archerfish. It is often confused with other archerfish (such as the banded archerfish and largescale archerfish), and may be sold with the others as one species. Smallscale archerfish do not need brackish water as do other members of its genus (though it can also live in brackish water); it is thus sometimes sold as the "freshwater archerfish".

In Thailand smallscale archerfish is called Pla Suea Pon Nam Nakhon Sawan (Thai: ปลาเสือพ่นน้ำนครสวรรค์; lit: Nakhon Sawan archerfish) or Pla Suea Pon Nam Leung (ปลาเสือพ่นน้ำเหลือง; yellow archerfish) because it is wild caught from Bueng Boraphet, Nakhon Sawan Province, and because it has a bright yellow colour. It is often the most common species in aquarium shop.
