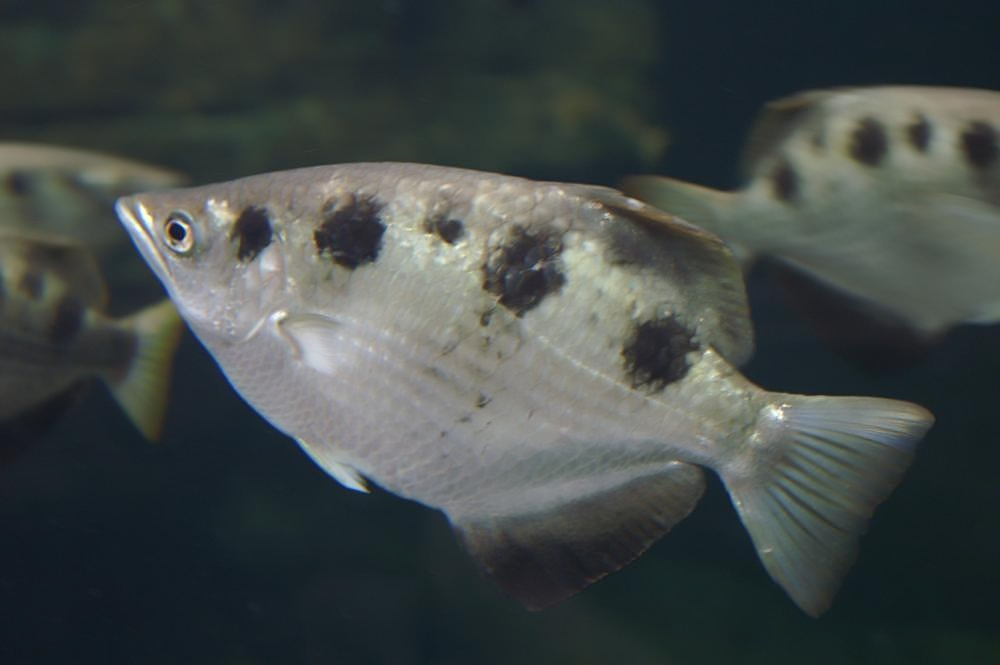

Conservation status
- Least Concern (IUCN 3.1)

Scientific classification
- Kingdom: Animalia
- Phylum: Chordata
- Class: Actinopterygii
- Division: Teleostei
- Order: Carangiformes
- Family: Toxotidae
- Genus: Toxotes
- Species: T. chatareus

Binomial name
- Toxotes chatareus (Hamilton, 1822)

Synonyms
- Coius chatareus Hamilton, 1822

= Toxotes chatareus =

Species of perciform fish in the archerfish genus Toxotes

Toxotes chatareus, sometimes known by the common names common archerfish, seven-spot archerfish or largescale archerfish, is a species of perciform fish in the archerfish genus Toxotes.

They are usually no larger than 20 centimetres (7.9 in) but may grow up to 40 centimetres (16 in). Unlike most archerfish, T. chatareus are sooty rather than silvery in colour. They are omnivorous, feeding on insects, fish, and vegetative matter at the surface of the water. Breeding occurs in the wet season, and 20,000 to 150,000 eggs may be laid at one time.

T. chatareus are distributed throughout southeast Asia and the Indo-Pacific and Australia. They may live in brackish or fresh water, inhabiting mangrove swamps and estuaries as well as further upstream in slow-moving rivers. While occasionally caught and eaten, T. chatareus are more commonly kept in the aquarium. They may be sold with other Toxotidae under the collective label "archerfish". Caring for T. chatareus in aquaria is somewhat difficult as they need live food given at the surface, rather than flake food.

== Description ==
Toxotes chatareus are of moderate size, usually between 15 and 20 centimetres (5.9 and 7.9 in). Rarely, they may reach up to 40 centimetres (16 in) in length. T. chatareus weigh up to 700 grams (25 oz). T. chatareus are believed to have a lifespan of three to five years.

T. chatareus have five or six dorsal spines, the fourth of which is the longest, and twelve or thirteen dorsal soft rays. The dorsal spines are generally shorter in specimens collected from freshwater than those from brackish water. T. chatareus also have three anal spines and fifteen to seventeen anal soft rays. T. chatareus have 33 or 34 lateral line scales. The caudal (tail) fin in almost square. The anal fin is undivided and the third anal spine is longest.

Overall, the body is sooty but sometimes silvery or gold. The dorsal side is "greenish brown". The pectoral fins are clear or "dusky" in colour. Pelvic fins may be darker and heavily pigmented. T. chatareus are white and usually has six or seven dark blotches, alternating long and short, along the dorsal side. A dark blotch is also found at the base of the caudal fin. The colour of these blotches may become darker or lighter due to time of day, environment, and stress. The blotches of young fish are darker than those of older fish. Startled or stressed fish are darker than unstressed fish; fish found in cloudy water may be completely white. It is unknown whether sexual dimorphism occurs.

=== Comparison to other archerfish ===
T. chatareus can be distinguished by their sooty colour, as opposed to the typical silver of most other archerfish. They have five dorsal spines, whereas T. jaculatrix have four. The markings on their flanks are also alternating long and short spots rather than bands. T. chatareus also have six or seven markings on its sides, whilst banded archerfish have four to five. T. chatareus has 29–30 lateral line scales, compared to 33–35 in T. jaculatrix. T. chatareus are also less common upstream than T. microlepis.

== Behaviour ==
=== Diet and feeding ===
Like other archerfish, Toxotes chatareus are able to spit streams of water to knock prey into the water. Despite lacking a neocortex, T. chatareus has well-developed visual cognition and pattern-recognition abilities which allow it to hit prey at distances of up to 150 centimetres (59 in) against complex backgrounds. Behaviour studies on the visual processing of T. chatareus have found that this species is able to recognize and distinguish between different human faces. They feed during the day, consuming plant matter and insects. They are omnivorous; their diet comprises crustaceans and other fishes, as well as zooplankton, rotifers, cladocerans, and insects (terrestrial and aquatic). T. chatareus has been called a "specialised insectivore" because it does not prey upon certain insects, particularly those that feed upon C_{4} plants. Diet appears to be ontogenetic (varying with age); small fish do not consume any vegetative matter, whilst it comprises one-fourth of the diet of larger fish. Diet also varies with location; when upstream, T. chatareus feed on insects, but when in the estuary, they feed on crustaceans.

=== Breeding ===
Toxotes chatareus reproduce by spawning. Spawning in T. chatareus are homochronal (females only spawn once per season) and iteroparous (spawning occurs more than once in a fish's lifespan). Breeding in Toxotes chatareus occurs in the wet season. T. chatareus breed both in brackish and in fresh water. Spawning occurs in shallow, muddy lagoons. Females lay about 20,000 to 150,000 buoyant eggs, each 0.4 millimetres in diameter. Females become mature at about 19 centimetres (7.5 in), and males become mature at about 18 centimetres (7.1 in). T. chatareus become reproductively active at 24 months. When they first hatch, larvae may be less than 4 mm in length; when they first feed, they are 5 mm and their mouthparts have become well-developed. There is no parental care in this species. Breeding in this species does not involve travelling downstream; nonetheless, populations may be affected by the construction of obstacles along rivers they inhabit. T. chatareus has not been bred in captivity.

== Distribution ==
Toxotes chatareus are found in India, Burma, Indonesia and New Guinea, and northern Australia. They are generally found in temperature ranges of 25 to 30 °C (77 to 86 °F), though they have been recorded at temperatures as high as 36 °C (97 °F) in the Alligator Rivers region and as low as 20.5 °C (68.9 °F) in the Burdekin river region; these are believed to be the upper and lower limits of their tolerance, respectively. Brackish mangrove swamps form its main habitat, but T. chatareus are also found in freshwater rivers and streams. It occurs in rivers of the Kimberley region of Western Australia, the Kakadu area of the Northern Territory and Arnhem Land in Australia. On the Mekong river, it may be found as far north as Thailand and Laos. They are also found in the upper parts of the Burdekin river, somehow having overcome the Burdekin Falls. T. chatareus are distributed more "patchily" in eastern Australia, and are less abundant.

T. chatareus are known to occur in shaded areas with vegetation overhead, usually at the top layer of the water column. They are found only where there is an intact riparian area, as this is a major source of their food. T. chatareus are usually not found in fast-flowing streams.

== Relationship to humans ==
Toxotes chatareus have a minor part in fisheries. They are sometimes caught by anglers and are described as "reasonable eating". T. chatareus are caught and sold in markets, where they are often grouped with the banded archerfish and simply sold as "archerfish".

T. chatareus are sometimes kept in the aquarium. In aquaria, they can reach about 20 centimetres (7.9 in) in length, compared to 40 centimetres (16 in) in the wild. They are one of only three archerfish species to be commonly traded (the others being T. jaculatrix and T. microlepis). They are placed in an aquarium in a minimum size of 100 centimetres (39 in) deep with a volume of 170 to 209 litres (37 to 46 imp gal; 45 to 55 US gal). T. chatareus prefer brackish water and need a tall aquarium. T. chatareus have the ability to "jump" out of the water, which in the wild is used to capture prey on low-hanging branches; they are capable of jumping out of an aquarium that is too short or uncovered. They are compatible with others of their species of similar size, but larger individuals may harass smaller individuals. T. chatareus is fed live food at the surface, though it does occasionally take flake food; because of this, caring for them is not done by beginners in most home aquaria.

T. chatareus are fairly common and not considered endangered. However, the destruction of their mangrove swamp habitat and increased fishing pressure may pose a risk in the future. The construction of weirs and tidal barrages within its habitat may affect populations in rivers. The growing population in Southeast Asia is also causing pollution to its habitat.

A study found increased (greater than 0.5 μg/g) levels of mercury in four out of ten specimens sampled at Lake Murray in Papua New Guinea. This may have contributed to increased mercury levels in locals who consumed several species of fish from the lake, T. chatareus included. Compared to the other fishes tested, T. chatareus displayed a high level of mercury. Sediments from the nearby Porgera gold and silver mine are the source of this mercury; the cause of the high level at which the mercury was accumulated in T. chatareus is not known.
