= Protoxotes =

Conservation status
- Least Concern (IUCN 3.1)

Scientific classification
- Kingdom: Animalia
- Phylum: Chordata
- Class: Actinopterygii
- Order: Carangiformes
- Family: Toxotidae
- Genus: Protoxotes; Whitley, 1950
- Species: P. lorentzi

Binomial name
- Protoxotes lorentzi (Weber, 1910)

Synonyms
- Toxotes lorentzi Weber, 1910

Species of fish

Protoxotes lorentzi is a tropical freshwater fish found in streams and swamps of the Northern Territory of Australia and the island of New Guinea. It is the only member of the genus Protoxotes. It was first named by Weber in 1910, and is commonly known as the primitive archerfish or Lorentz's archerfish.

== Taxonomy and description ==
Protoxotes lorentzi is believed to range in length from 69–150 millimetres (2.7–5.9 in), though specimens reaching 230 millimetres (9.1 in) in length have been observed. P. lorentzi normally has five dorsal spines and is a silvery tan or brown colour, with a dark pectoral base. While bars and spots are distinct features of other members of the genus, T. lorentzi usually has no markings, or else very faint bars on its sides. P. lorentzi usually has three gill rakers on the lower limb of its first branchial arch, but two and four are also possible. It usually has fewer than 38 scales on its lateral line.

Protoxotes lorentzi was described by Max Carl Wilhelm Weber in 1910. It was initially believed that P. lorentzi is the most "primitive" species of archerfish due to its lack of markings and straight dorsal line, a view that Weber endorsed; Gilbert Whitley, who shared this view, reclassified T. lorentzi under the new monotypic genus Prototoxotes which he erected for it in 1950. Later authors initially disputed the assertion that T. lorentzi is more primitive and considered Protoxotes a synonym of Toxotes. However, the first comprehensive analysis that included both DNA sequence data and morphological data supported Whitley's assertion and recommended that this species be classified in Protoxotes given the clear separation and redundancy of Toxotidae and Toxotes in recent classifications.

== Behaviour ==
Like other archerfish, P. lorentzi feeds on terrestrial insects by shooting a stream of water onto low-hanging vegetation at the edges of streams and capturing the insects as they fall into the water. Such insects are believed to make up a significant portion of its diet.

== Distribution and habitat ==
The range of Protoxotes lorentzi includes a handful of areas in the Northern Territory of Australia: the Timor Sea drainage at Yam Creek, the Finniss River, and Sawcut Creek, Deaf Adder Creek, and Baroalba Creek, part of the South Alligator River system. In addition, it is also common in the Fly River Delta. Its range also includes the Balima River and the Merauke River of central southern New Guinea.

Protoxotes lorentzi generally inhabits swamps and the edges of streams with vegetative cover. It is most commonly observed in surface waters.

Because P. lorentzi has wide distribution and no major widespread threats are known, IUCN considers it to be of "Least Concern".
