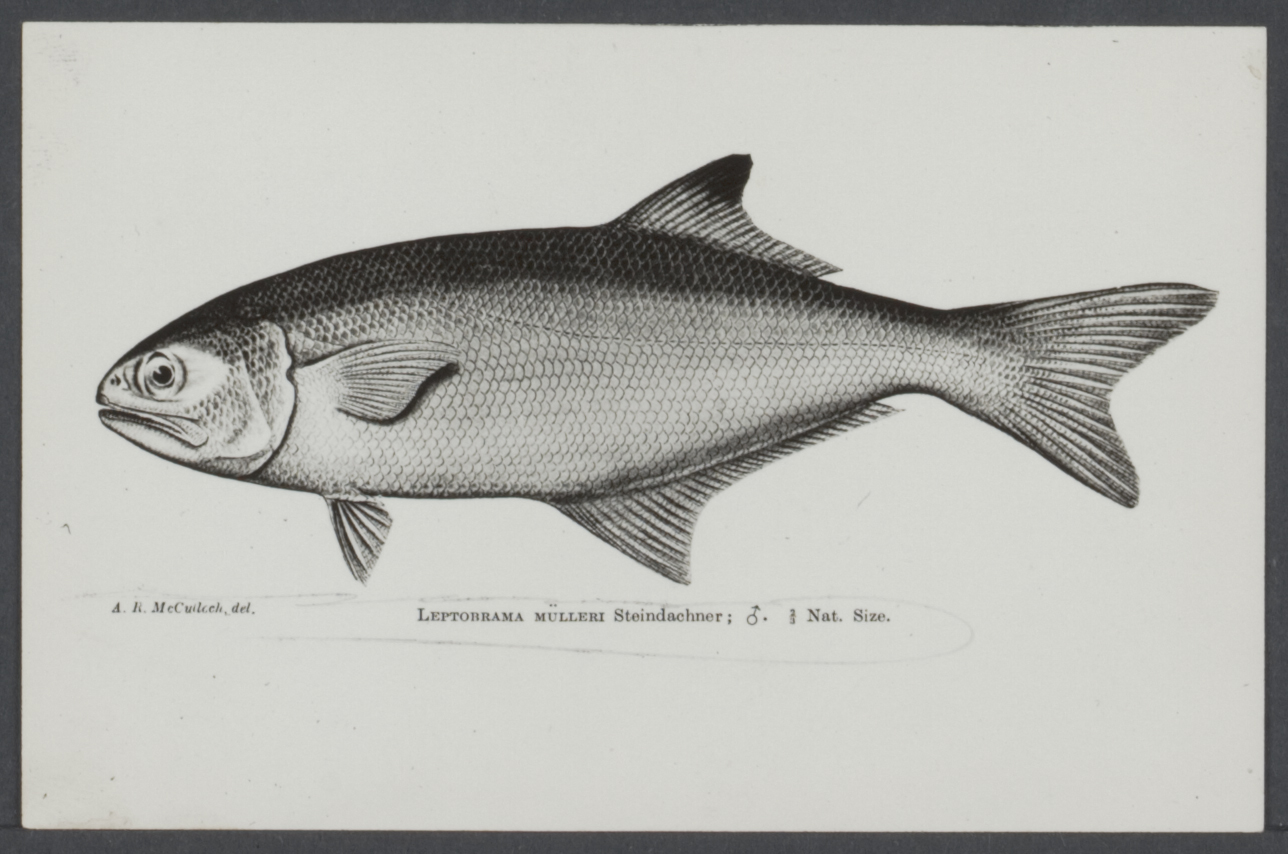
- Leptobrama muelleri

Scientific classification
- Kingdom: Animalia
- Phylum: Chordata
- Class: Actinopterygii
- Order: Carangiformes
- Family: Leptobramidae; J. D. Ogilby, 1913
- Genus: Leptobrama; Steindachner, 1878

Synonyms
- Neopempheris Macleay, 1881

= Leptobrama =

Genus of ray-finned fishes

Leptobrama is a genus of ray-finned fish in the order Carangiformes found in the Pacific Ocean. This genus is the only member of the family Leptobramidae.

== Species ==
There are currently 2 recognized species in this genus:

- Leptobrama muelleri Steindachner, 1878 (Spot-fin beachsalmon)
- Leptobrama pectoralis (E. P. Ramsay & J. D. Ogilby, 1887) (Long-fin beachsalmon)
