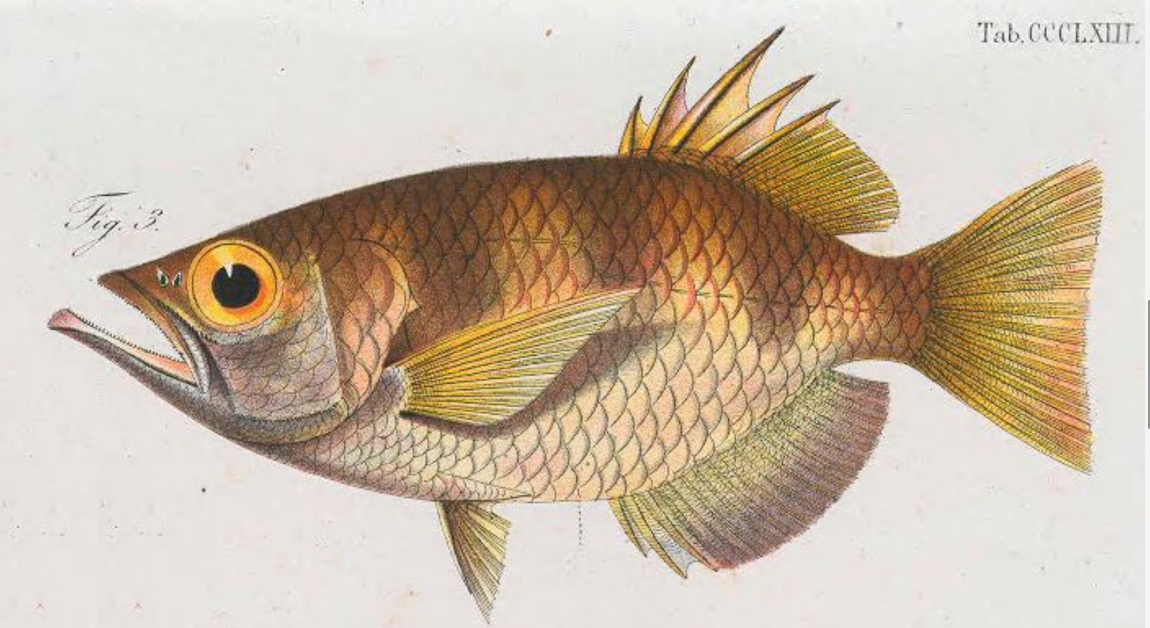

Conservation status
- Least Concern (IUCN 2.3)

Scientific classification
- Kingdom: Animalia
- Phylum: Chordata
- Class: Actinopterygii
- Order: Carangiformes
- Family: Toxotidae
- Genus: Toxotes
- Species: T. oligolepis

Binomial name
- Toxotes oligolepis Bleeker, 1876

= Big scale archerfish =

Species of ray-finned fish

The big scale archerfish (Toxotes oligolepis) is a species of ray-finned fish in the family Toxotidae. It is endemic to the Molucca Islands (Indonesia) and possibly the Philippines. Almost nothing is known about this species and there is only a single confirmed specimen, which likely was collected from Bacan ("Batjan") Islands. It was formerly reported from Western Australia (in which case the common name western archerfish was used), but this is a separate species, T. kimberleyensis.
