= Cyprinion acinaces acinaces =

Scientific classification
- Kingdom: Animalia
- Phylum: Chordata
- Class: Actinopterygii
- Order: Cypriniformes
- Family: Cyprinidae
- Genus: Cyprinion
- Species: C. acinaces
- Subspecies: C. a. acinaces

Trinomial name
- Cyprinion acinaces acinaces Banister & M. A. Clarke, 1977

Subspecies of fish

Cyprinion acinaces acinaces is a subspecies of Cyprinion acinaces.

== Footnotes ==
- Froese, Rainer; Pauly, Daniel (eds.). "Cyprinion acinaces+acinaces". FishBase.
