= Paracapoeta trutta =

Conservation status
- Least Concern (IUCN 3.1)

Scientific classification
- Kingdom: Animalia
- Phylum: Chordata
- Class: Actinopterygii
- Order: Cypriniformes
- Family: Cyprinidae
- Subfamily: Barbinae
- Genus: Paracapoeta
- Species: P. trutta

Binomial name
- Paracapoeta trutta (Heckel, 1843)

Synonyms
- Scaphiodon trutta Heckel, 1843; Capoeta trutta (Heckel, 1843); Varicorhinus capoetoides Pellegrin, 1939; Capoeta barroisi persica M, S, Karaman, 1969

Species of fish

Paracapoeta trutta, the longspine scraper or spotted scraper, is a species of cyprinid fish from the Middle East. It is known from inland waters in Iran, Iraq, Syria, Armenia and Turkey, and is often quite abundant.

It spawns in running waters, but inhabits in other times also many other habitats including reservoirs and marshes. Most commonly it is found in slowly running lowland rivers.

Paracapoeta trutta is commonly used as a food fish. It may grow up to 48 cm (19 in) length.
