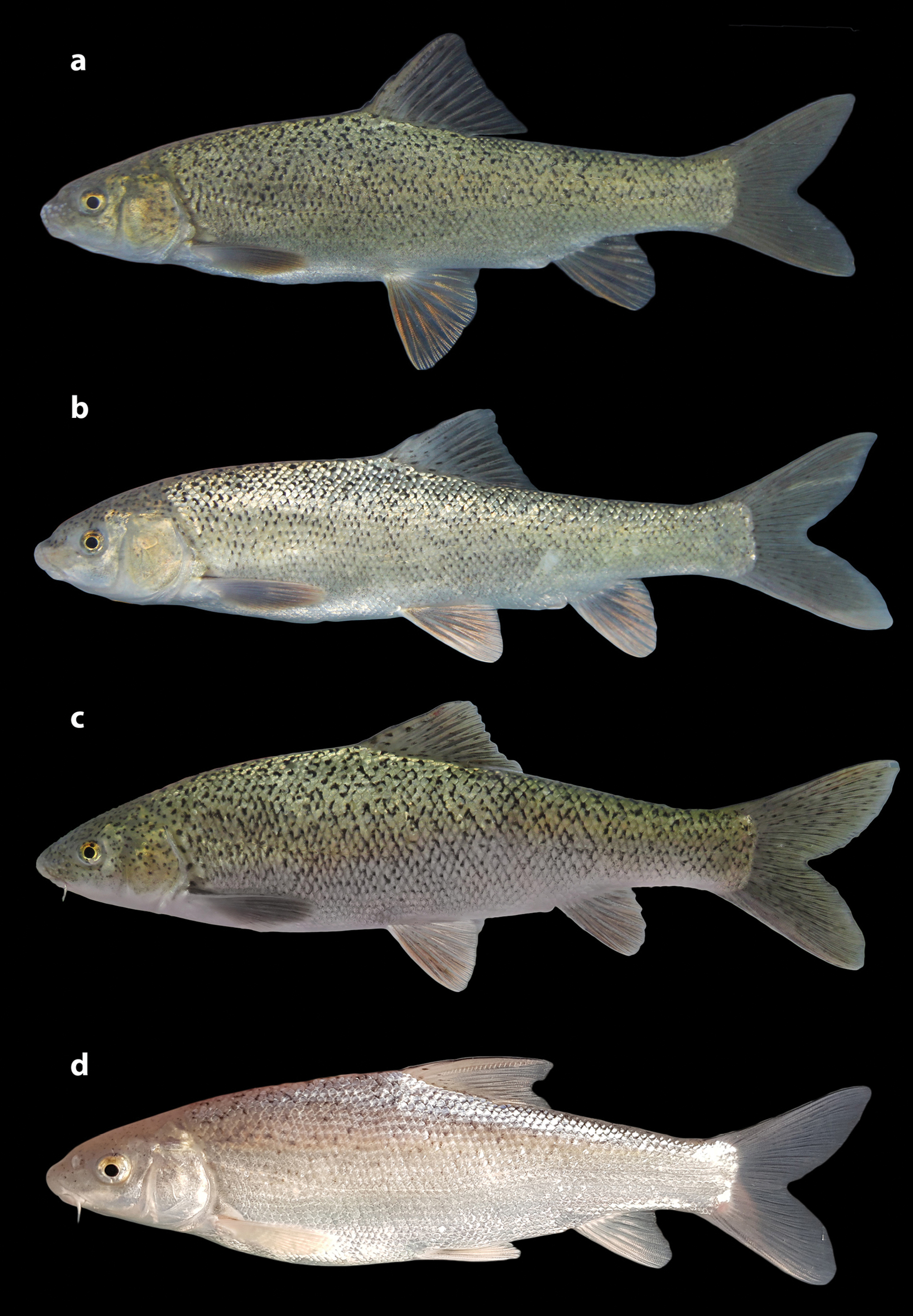
- Lateral views of Paracapoeta erhani from various streams in its range. d at the bottom is from the type locality of C. turani

Conservation status
- Least Concern (IUCN 3.1)

Scientific classification
- Kingdom: Animalia
- Phylum: Chordata
- Class: Actinopterygii
- Order: Cypriniformes
- Family: Cyprinidae
- Subfamily: Barbinae
- Genus: Paracapoeta
- Species: P. erhani

Binomial name
- Paracapoeta erhani (Turan, Kottelat & Ekmekçi, 2008)

Synonyms
- Capoeta erhani Turan, Kottelat & Ekmekçi, 2008; Capoeta turani Özuluğ & Freyhof, 2008

= Paracapoeta erhani =

Species of fish

Paracapoeta erhani, also known as the Ceyhan scraper or Seyhan scraper, is a Turkish species of freshwater cyprinid fish in the genus Paracapoeta.

It lives in the drainage basins of the Ceyhan and Seyhan Rivers, in many kinds of streams and also in reservoirs. These waters are in a relatively good ecological shape, and the species is therefore considered to be safe (least concern). The Seyhan population, formerly classified as Capoeta turani was classified as Near Threatened before being synonymised, which happened in the same paper that erected Paracapoeta in 2022.
