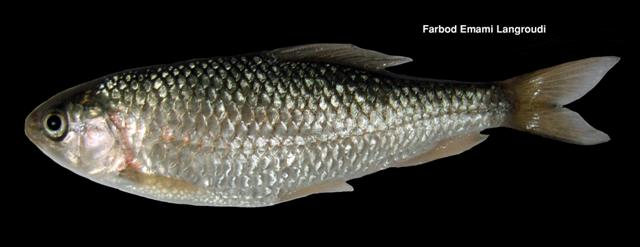
- Cyprinion macrostomum

Conservation status
- Least Concern (IUCN 3.1)

Scientific classification
- Kingdom: Animalia
- Phylum: Chordata
- Class: Actinopterygii
- Division: Teleostei
- Order: Cypriniformes
- Family: Cyprinidae
- Subfamily: Barbinae
- Genus: Cyprinion
- Species: C. macrostomum

Binomial name
- Cyprinion macrostomum Heckel, 1843

Synonyms
- C. macrostomus Heckel, 1843; C. neglectus Heckel, 1847

= Cyprinion macrostomum =

Species of fish

Cyprinion macrostomum, also known as the kangal fish, is a ray-finned cyprinid native to Iran, Syria, and Turkey.
