= Sangkarewang Formation =

Geologic formation in Indonesia

- Stratigraphic range: ?early-mid Eocene
- Type: Geological formation
- Unit of: Ombilin Basin
- Underlies: Sawahlunto Formation
- Overlies: Brani Formation

Lithology
- Primary: Shale, sandstone
- Other: Oil shales

Location
- Coordinates: 0.6°S 100.8°E
- Approximate paleocoordinates: 0.5°S 110.3°E
- Region: West Sumatra
- Country: Indonesia
- Sangkarewang Formation (Indonesia)

The Sankarewang Formation is an ?Early or Middle Eocene-aged geological formation in Sumatra, Indonesia near Padang. It is among the very few Paleogene fossil deposits from Southeast Asia that preserves a freshwater ecosystem, and contains many of the earliest records of freshwater fish taxa that now predominate the region. Many of the fishes from this formation are well-preserved as articulated skeletons. The fossils of the formation have been known since the 1870s, although they only received significant attention during the 1930s and again starting from the mid-2010s.

The age for this formation has long been disputed, with suggested ages ranging from the Cretaceous to the Miocene. Although the exact age still remains uncertain, most recent studies have settled on a tentative Paleogene age, with estimates ranging from the Paleocene to the Oligocene. More recently, palynological data suggests that the overlying Sawahlunto Formation is of middle-late Eocene in age, which would most likely place the Sangkarewang Formation in the early-mid Eocene.

It was deposited within the Ombilin Basin, a small Paleogene-aged rift basin that formed from deformation along the Great Sumatran fault. The Sangkarewang Formation was deposited within a freshwater rift lake that formed in this basin early on, with anoxic bottom waters allowing for the fossilization of the fish skeletons. The Sawahlunto Formation, long exploited for its coal seams, was later deposited in the lake on top of the Sangkarewang Formation. During the Oligocene, this gave way to a river delta (the Sawahtambang Formation), and was later flooded by the sea by the Miocene (the Ombilin Formation), before a tectonic uplift raised it above the sea. The formation has been explored for its oil shales.

== Paleobiota ==
=== Bony fish ===
Partially based on Woodward (1901) & Sanders (1934). Sanders (1934) published a comprehensive monograph about the fishes of the formation using a large number of specimens. However, the vast majority of these specimens are now lost, and may have potentially been destroyed during World War II, preventing any further study of her specimens.

Genus	Species	Material	Notes	Images
aff. Amblypharyngodon	aff A. sp.	Pharyngeals.	A potential carplet.	
Bagarius	B. gigas	Pectoral arch.	A goonch catfish.	
"Chirocentrus"	"C." polyodon	Jaws	A fish of uncertain affinities, assigned to the wolf herrings.	
Eocyprinus	E. sumatranus	Articulated skeletons, all lost.	A barb.	
Hadromos	H. sandersae	Articulated skeleton.	A barb.	
Hexasephus	H. guentheri	Pharyngeals and dentition.	A cypriniform.	
Musperia	M. radiata	Fragmentary specimens, another complete specimen likely destroyed	A bonytongue.	
Notopterus	N. primaevus	Articulated skeleton.	A featherback.	
Ombilinichthys	O. yamini	Articulated skeleton.	A gourami.	
?Osphronemus	O. "goramy"	Lost articulated skeletons	A gourami initially assigned to the modern giant gourami, and likely in the genus Osphronemus; however, the specimens have been lost, hindering further analysis.	
'Osteochilus'	'O.' fossilis	Lost articulated skeleton	A potential labeonine.	
Padangia	P. amblyostoma (=Thynnichthys amblyostoma)	Articulated skeleton.	A barb.	
Pangasius	P. indicus (=Pseudeutropius verbeeki, Brachyspondylus saropteryx)	Articulated skeleton.	A shark catfish.	
Pauciuncus	P. bussyi (=Puntius bussyi)	Articulated skeletons	A potential smiliogastrine.	
Protosyngnathus	P. sumatrensis (=Aulorhynchus sumatrensis)	Articulated skeleton.	A pipefish-like syngnathiform.	
'Rasbora'	'R.' antiqua	Lost articulated skeletons	A danionin.	
'Rasbora'	'R.' mohri	Lost articulated skeletons	A danionin.	
Sangkarewangia	S. sumatranus	Articulated skeleton.	A barb.	
Scleropages	S. sp.	Fragmentary remains.	An arowana.	
Sundabarbus	S. megacephalus (=Barbus megacephalus)	Articulated skeleton.	A barb.	
Toxotes	T. beauforti	Articulated skeleton.	An archerfish, closely resembling modern species.	

=== Birds ===
Genus	Species	Material	Notes	Images
Protoplotus	P. beauforti	Articulated skeleton with gastroliths.	A protoplotid suliform, related to cormorants and darters.	
