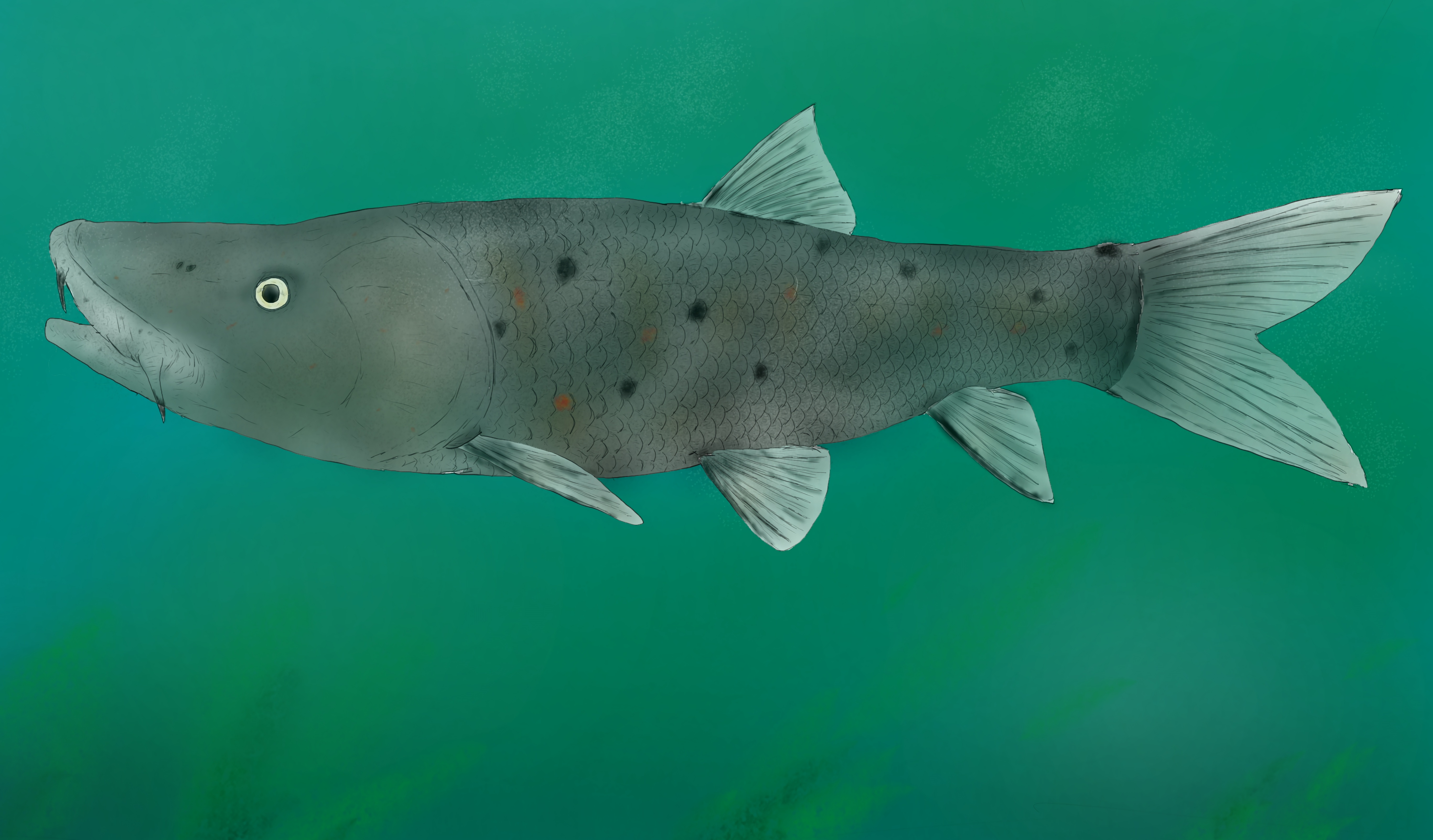

Scientific classification
- Kingdom: Animalia
- Phylum: Chordata
- Class: Actinopterygii
- Division: Teleostei
- Order: Cypriniformes
- Family: Cyprinidae
- Subfamily: Barbinae
- Genus: †Sundabarbus; Murray, 2019

Type species
- Barbus megacephalus Günther, 1875

= Sundabarbus =

Sundabarbus Temporal range: Eocene

Genus of fishes

Sundabarbus is a genus of barbinae that lived in Sangkarewang Formation, Sumatra during the Eocene epoch. It was first described as Barbus megacephalus in 1876 and reclassified to its own genus in 2019. Although there were several specimens that had been found previously, only one fossil which is the holotype survive and stored in Natural History Museum.

Based on the surviving specimen, Sundabarbus was a large fish reaching 50 cm in standard length. The head, similar to other Sangkarewang cyprinid, is proportionally large taking up to 39% of its standard length (hence the species name). Sundabarbus head is said to be as deep as the greatest body depth with no barbel trace. From the preserved mouth part, it can be inferred that they have a more dorsally oriented mouth.

The operculum is as wide as it is tall. On the dorsal half of the posterior edge opercle, there are four or five ridges projecting posteriorly as small spines. Moving to the body part, its dorsal fin is located closer to the posterior part of the head than to the caudal fin. Preserved tail part show that the caudal fin is forked.

It is worth mentioning that Murray (2019) considered Sundabarbus as one of the oldest cyprinid ever found if the surrounding depost age are indeed Eocene age. With other cyprinid from same location such as Padangia, they are probably the earliest confirmed cyprinid beside other genera from China such as Palaeogobio
