= Paracapoeta mandica =

Scientific classification
- Kingdom: Animalia
- Phylum: Chordata
- Class: Actinopterygii
- Order: Cypriniformes
- Family: Cyprinidae
- Subfamily: Barbinae
- Genus: Paracapoeta
- Species: P. mandica

Binomial name
- Paracapoeta mandica Bianco & Bănărescu, 1982

Synonyms
- Capoeta mandica Bianco & Bănărescu, 1982

Species of fish

Paracapoeta mandica is a species of ray-finned fish endemic to Iran.
