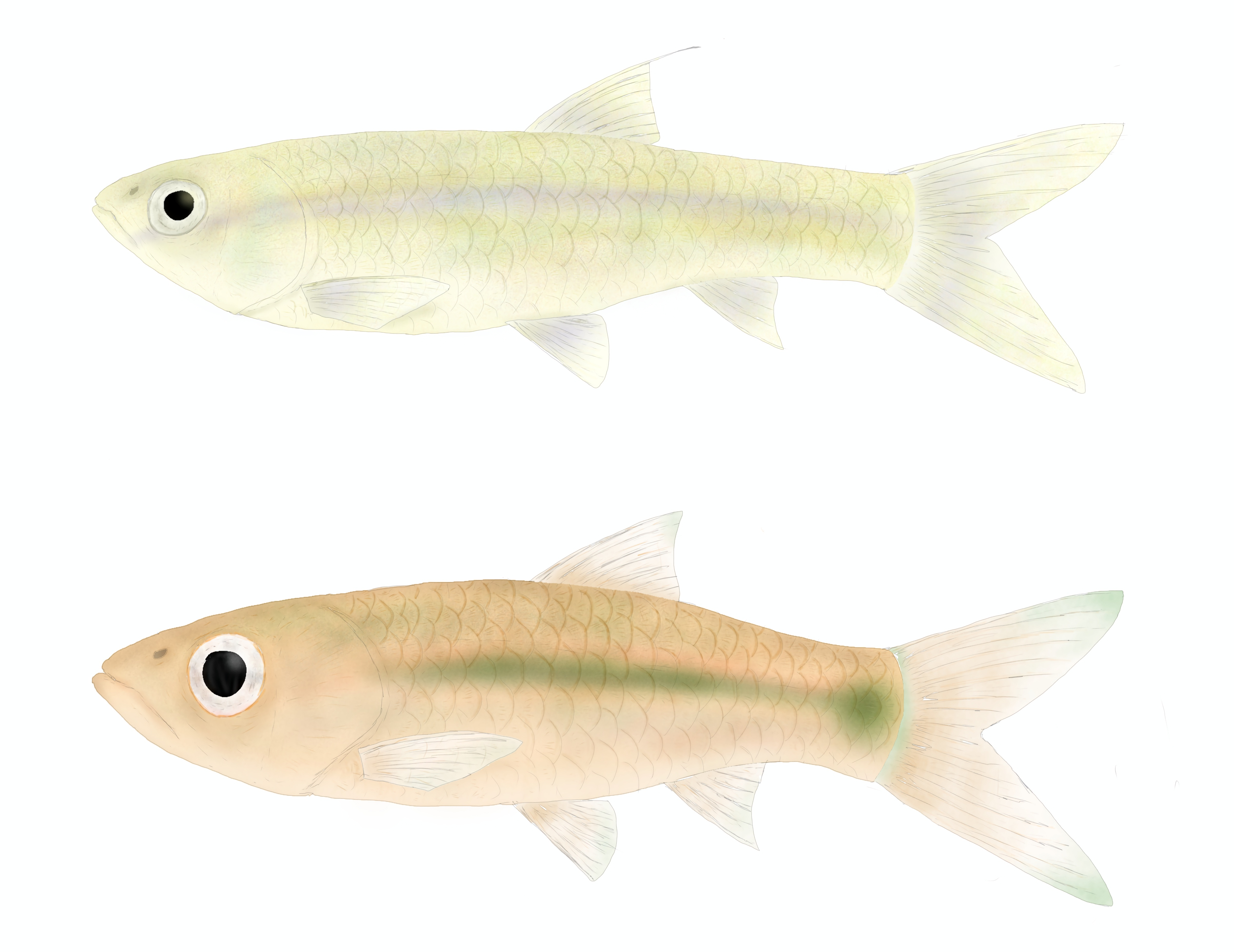
- Reconstruction of R. mohri (bottom) compared to R. antiqua

Scientific classification
- Kingdom: Animalia
- Phylum: Chordata
- Class: Actinopterygii
- Division: Teleostei
- Order: Cypriniformes
- Family: Danionidae
- Genus: Rasbora
- Species: †R. mohri

Binomial name
- †Rasbora mohri Sanders, 1934

= Rasbora mohri =

Rasbora mohri Temporal range: Eocene

Extinct species of fish

Rasbora mohri is a fossil species of Danionidae, one of the two found in Eocene-aged rock from Sangkarewang Formation. Like R. antiqua, the holotype is thought to be lost and no other types have been foundl; its assignment to Rasbora is similarly tentative. The original describer (Sanders, 1934) wrote that R. mohri differs from R. antiqua by having relatively longer head (around 33% or a third of its SL). This proportion is more in line with other Sangkarewang cypriniforms.
