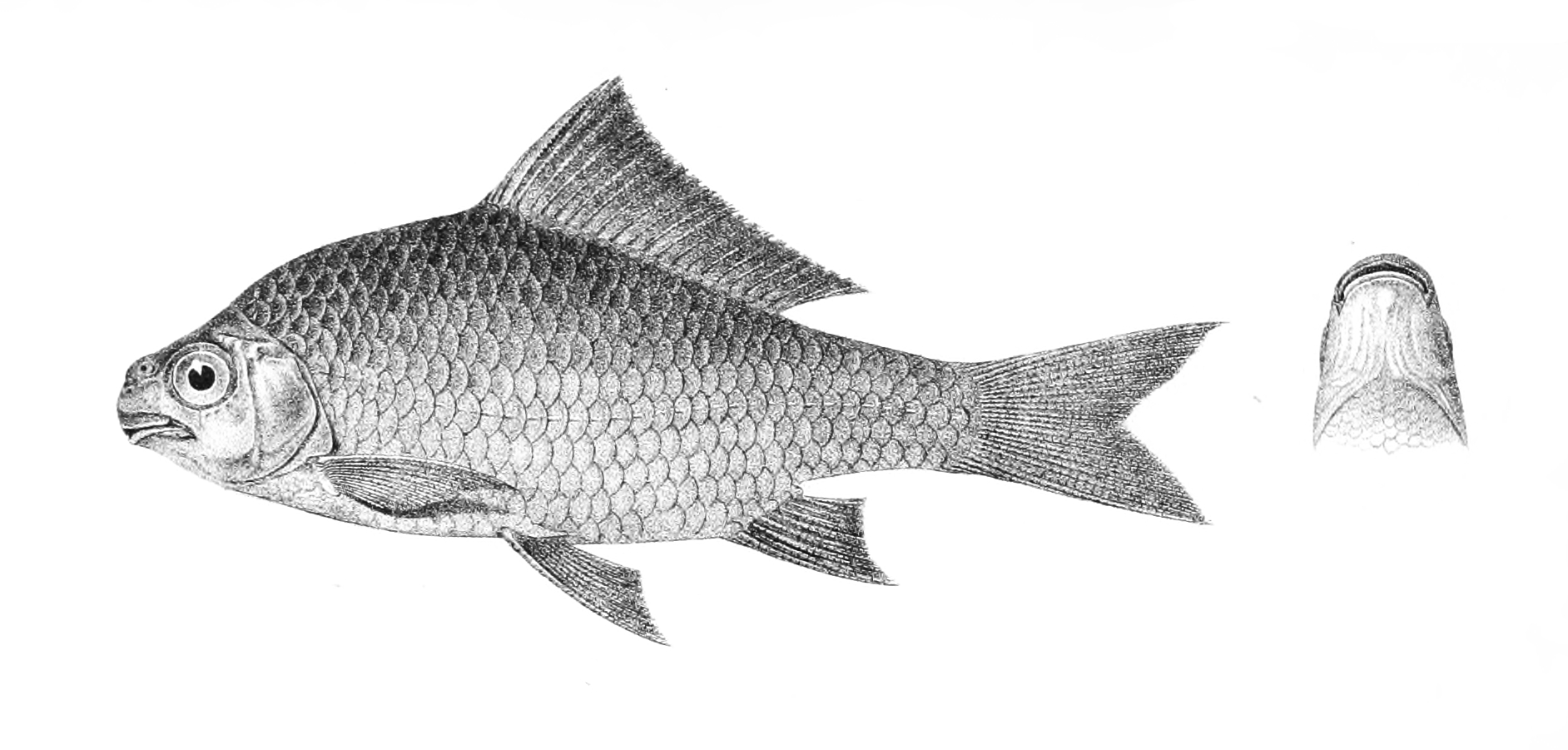
- Semiplotus modestus

Scientific classification
- Domain: Eukaryota
- Kingdom: Animalia
- Phylum: Chordata
- Class: Actinopterygii
- Order: Cypriniformes
- Family: Cyprinidae
- Subfamily: Barbinae
- Genus: Semiplotus; Bleeker, 1859

Type species
- Cyprinion semiplotus McClelland, 1839

= Semiplotus =

Genus of fishes

Semiplotus is a genus of cyprinid fishes found in south Asia.

== Species ==
There are currently three recognized species in this genus:

- Semiplotus cirrhosus B. L. Chaudhuri, 1919
- Semiplotus manipurensis Vishwanath & Kosygin, 2000
- Semiplotus modestus F. Day, 1870 (Burmese kingfish)
- Semiplotus semiplotus (McClelland, 1839) (Assamese kingfish)
