= Cyprinion tenuiradius =

Scientific classification
- Kingdom: Animalia
- Phylum: Chordata
- Class: Actinopterygii
- Division: Teleostei
- Order: Cypriniformes
- Family: Cyprinidae
- Genus: Cyprinion
- Species: C. tenuiradius

Binomial name
- Cyprinion tenuiradius Heckel, 1847

Species of fish

Cyprinion tenuiradius is a species of ray-finned fish in the genus Cyprinion.

== Footnotes ==
- Froese, Rainer; Pauly, Daniel (eds.). "Cyprinion tenuiradius". FishBase.
