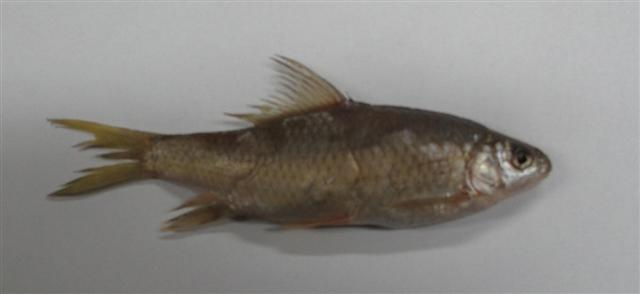

Conservation status
- Least Concern (IUCN 3.1)

Scientific classification
- Kingdom: Animalia
- Phylum: Chordata
- Class: Actinopterygii
- Division: Teleostei
- Order: Cypriniformes
- Family: Cyprinidae
- Genus: Cyprinion
- Species: C. kais

Binomial name
- Cyprinion kais Heckel, 1843

Synonyms
- Cyprinion cypris Heckel, 1843

= Cyprinion kais =

Species of fish

Cyprinion kais, the Kais kingfish or smallmouth lotak, is a species of ray-finned fish in the genus Cyprinion. It is found in the drainage basins of the rivers Tigris and Euphrates, and was also found in the Queiq system but it appears to have been extirpated from that basin following the drying up of that river. Its range covers Turkey, Syria, Iraq and Iran. Its preferred habitat is flowing water in larger warm streams and rivers from where it migrates to canals and probably to other artificial water bodies to forage.

== Footnotes ==
- Froese, Rainer; Pauly, Daniel (eds.). "Cyprinion kais". FishBase.
