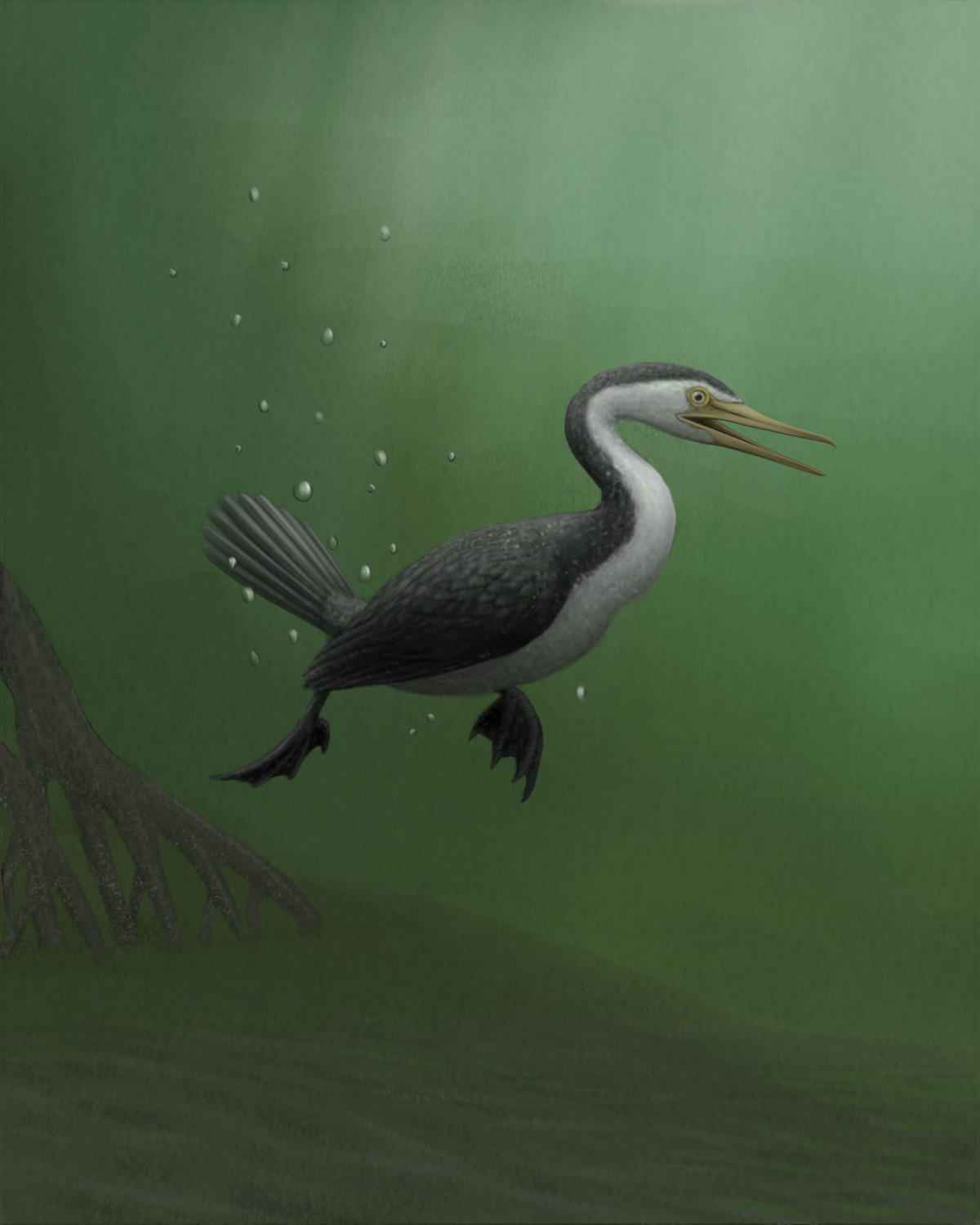
- Life restoration

Scientific classification
- Kingdom: Animalia
- Phylum: Chordata
- Class: Aves
- Order: Suliformes
- Family: †Protoplotidae van Tets, Rich, & Marino, 1989
- Genus: †Protoplotus; Lambrecht, 1931
- Species: †P. beauforti

Binomial name
- †Protoplotus beauforti Lambrecht, 1931

= Protoplotus =

Protoplotus Temporal range: ?early-mid Eocene

Extinct genus of birds

Protoplotus (meaning "original Plotus") is an extinct genus of waterbird that inhabited Indonesia during the early-mid Cenozoic, most likely during the Eocene. It contains a single species, P. beauforti (named after Lieven Ferdinand de Beaufort) known from a largely complete, well-preserved skeleton from the Sangkarewang Formation of Indonesia. It is the only member of the family Protoplotidae and, depending on age, one of the earliest known Suliformes.

Protoplotus was a rather small waterbird that inhabited the freshwater rift lake where the Sangkarewang Formation would be deposited. It closely resembled and likely had a similar lifestyle to modern cormorants and darters, and for a while was considered to belong to the Anhingidae. However, more recent studies have found it to be distinct from both, and it is now placed in its own family, which is thought to be related to both cormorants and anhingas.

Uniquely, the single fossil skeleton of Protoplotus preserves gastroliths. This suggests that it may have seasonally switched its diet from fish to fruit.
