= Semiplotus cirrhosus =

Conservation status
- Data Deficient (IUCN 3.1)

Scientific classification
- Kingdom: Animalia
- Phylum: Chordata
- Class: Actinopterygii
- Order: Cypriniformes
- Family: Cyprinidae
- Genus: Semiplotus
- Species: S. cirrhosus

Binomial name
- Semiplotus cirrhosus Chaudhuri, 1919

Species of fish

Semiplotus cirrhosus is a species of cyprinid in the genus Semiplotus. It inhabits Myanmar and has a maximum length of 4.1 centimetres (1.6 in) among males. It is considered harmless to humans and is classified as "data deficient" on the IUCN Red List.
