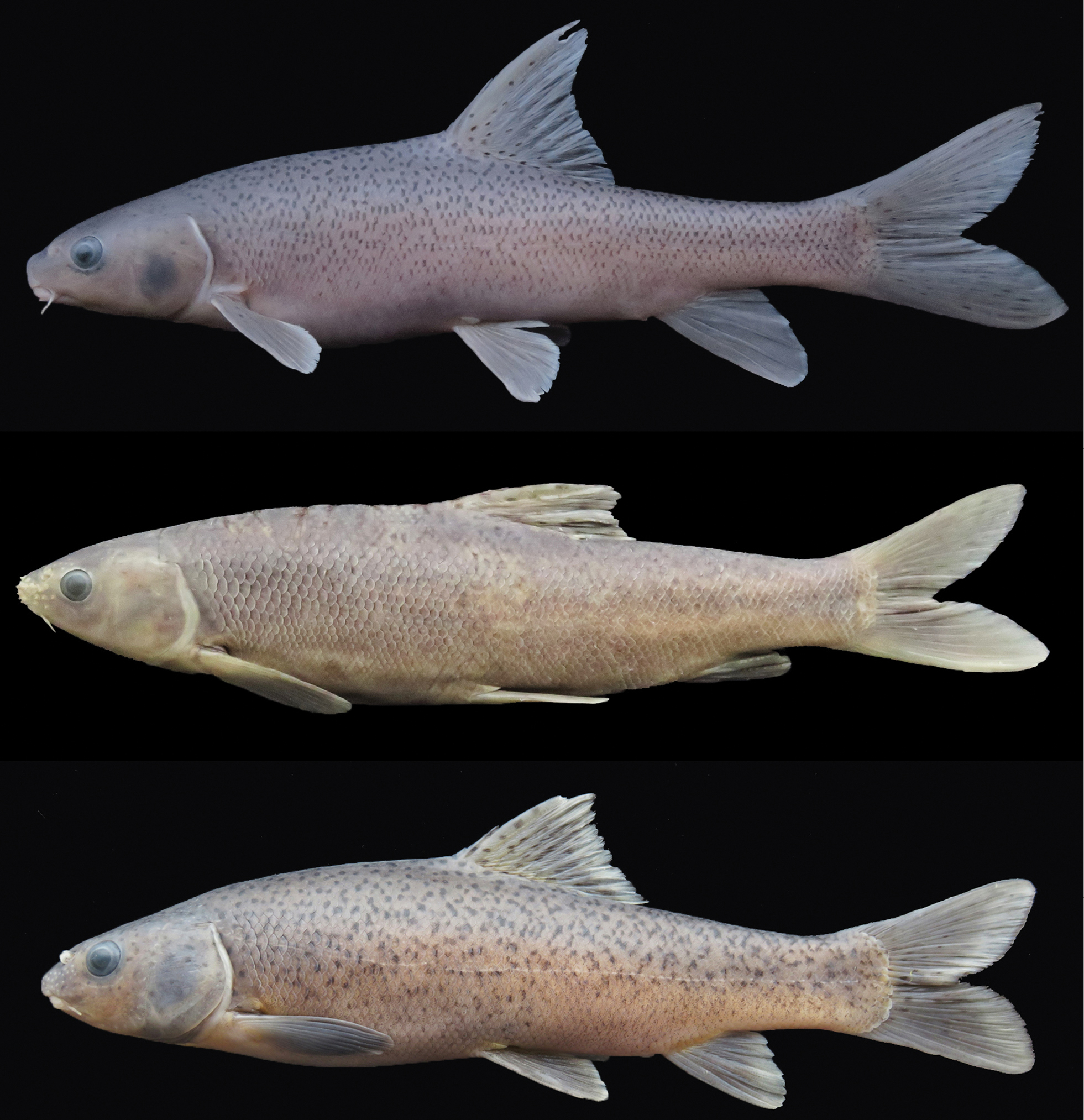
- Lateral view of some Paracapoeta species: From top, P. trutta; P. barroisi; P. erhani

Scientific classification
- Kingdom: Animalia
- Phylum: Chordata
- Class: Actinopterygii
- Division: Teleostei
- Order: Cypriniformes
- Family: Cyprinidae
- Subfamily: Barbinae
- Genus: Paracapoeta; Turan, Kaya, Aksu & Bektaş, 2022

Type species
- Scaphiodon trutta Heckel, 1843

= Paracapoeta =

Genus of fishes

Paracapoeta is a genus of fish in the family Cyprinidae found in Mesopotamia, Cilicia and the Levant, Western Asia. This genus is closely related to Luciobarbus and was formerly the Mesopotamian clade of Capoeta before being split off in 2022. The generic name alludes to παρά (pará) meaning "near" and Capoeta.

== Species ==
There are currently 5 recognized species in this genus:

- Paracapoeta anamisensis (Zareian, Esmaeili & Freyhof, 2016)
- Paracapoeta barroisi (Lortet, 1894) (Orontes scraper, Tigris barb)
- Paracapoeta erhani (Turan, Kottelat & Ekmekçi, 2008) (Ceyhan scraper)
- Paracapoeta mandica (Bianco & Bănărescu, 1982)
- Paracapoeta trutta (Heckel, 1843) (longspine scraper)
