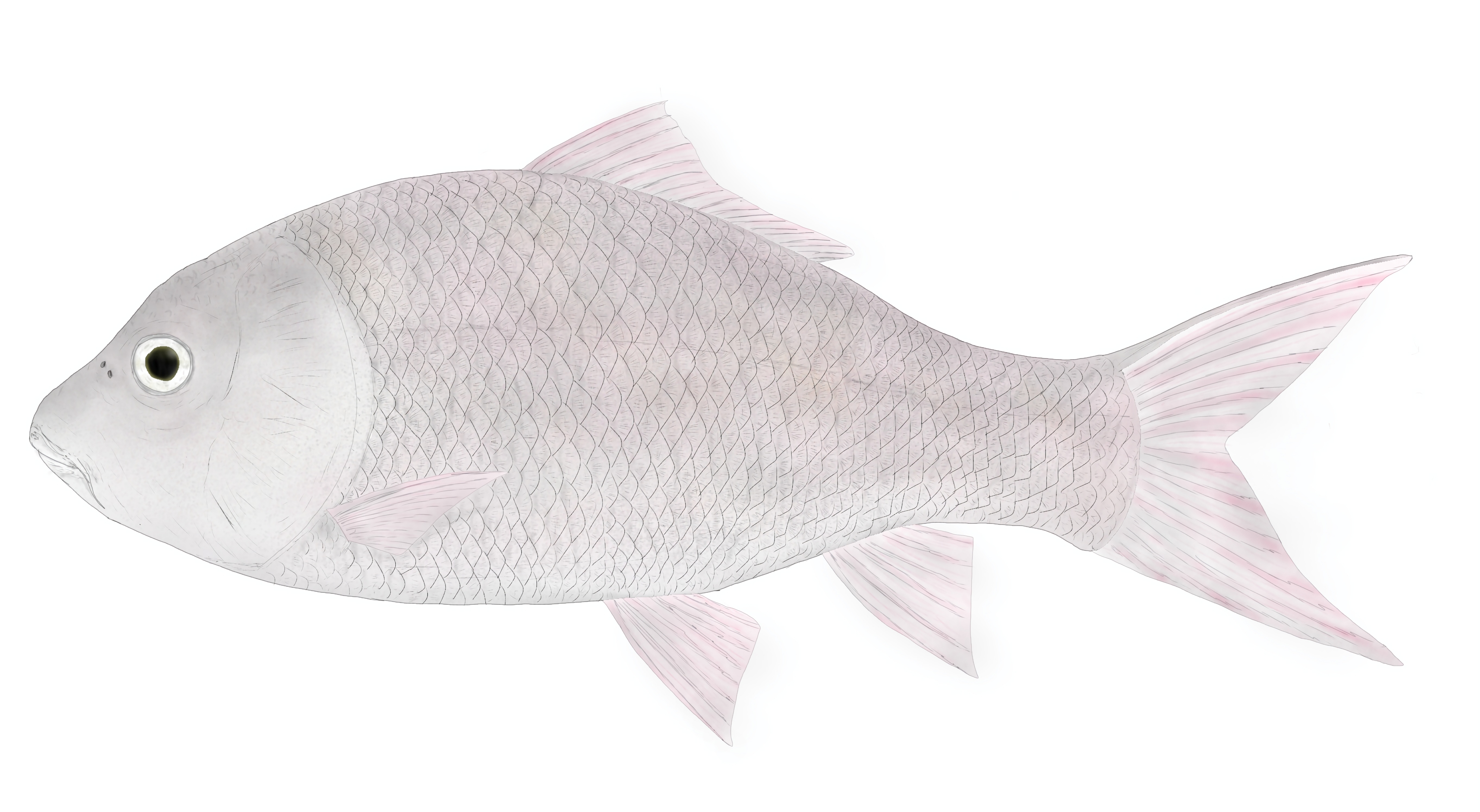

Scientific classification
- Kingdom: Animalia
- Phylum: Chordata
- Class: Actinopterygii
- Division: Teleostei
- Order: Cypriniformes
- Family: Cyprinidae
- Subfamily: Labeoninae
- Genus: "Osteochilus"
- Species: "O." fossilis

Binomial name
- "Osteochilus" fossilis Sanders, 1934

= Osteochilus fossilis =

"Osteochilus" fossilis Temporal range: Eocene

Extinct ray-finned fish

"Osteochilus" fossilis is a genus of cypriniforms (presumably a Labeoninae) that lived in Sangkarewang Formation during the Eocene epoch. It is placed in genus Osteochilus tentatively based on the placement and ray number of the fins along taking account of its body proportion. There are only one specimen that was found but its current whereabout is unknown. Based on the describer (Sanders, 1934), O. fossilis have a relatively big head (around 29%) with a very deep body profile. The rear part was not preserved completely since it is missing the caudal peduncle and fins.
