= Paracapoeta anamisensis =

Scientific classification
- Kingdom: Animalia
- Phylum: Chordata
- Class: Actinopterygii
- Order: Cypriniformes
- Family: Cyprinidae
- Genus: Paracapoeta
- Species: P. anamisensis

Binomial name
- Paracapoeta anamisensis (Zareian, Esmaeili & Freyhof, 2016)

Synonyms
- Capoeta anamisensis Zareian, Esmaeili & Freyhof, 2016

Species of fish

Paracapoeta anamisensis is a species of cyprinid in the genus Paracapoeta, native to Iran.
