= Cyprinion microphthalmum =

Scientific classification
- Kingdom: Animalia
- Phylum: Chordata
- Class: Actinopterygii
- Order: Cypriniformes
- Family: Cyprinidae
- Genus: Cyprinion
- Species: C. microphthalmum

Binomial name
- Cyprinion microphthalmum (F. Day, 1880)

Synonyms
- Scaphiodon microphthalmus Day, 1880; Scaphiodon baluchiorum Jenkins, 1910

Species of fish

Cyprinion microphthalmum is a species of ray-finned fish in the genus Cyprinion. This species may be a synonym of Cyprinion watsoni. If valid it is found in Iran, Pakistan, Afghanistan and the Arabian peninsula.

Cyprinion microphthalmum microphthalmum is a subspecies of Cyprinion microphthalmum.
