= Cyprinion mhalense =

Conservation status
- Least Concern (IUCN 3.1)

Scientific classification
- Kingdom: Animalia
- Phylum: Chordata
- Class: Actinopterygii
- Order: Cypriniformes
- Family: Cyprinidae
- Genus: Cyprinion
- Species: C. mhalense

Binomial name
- Cyprinion mhalense Alkahem & Behnke, 1983

Species of fish

Cyprinion mhalense is a species of ray-finned fish in the genus Cyprinion. It is endemic to the eastern part of the Sarawat Mountains in Saudi Arabia where it occurs in the upper reaches of wadis. It has been recorded from shallow, permanent and slow running water, as well as intermittent streams.

== Footnotes ==
- Froese, Rainer; Pauly, Daniel (eds.). "Cyprinion mhalense". FishBase.
