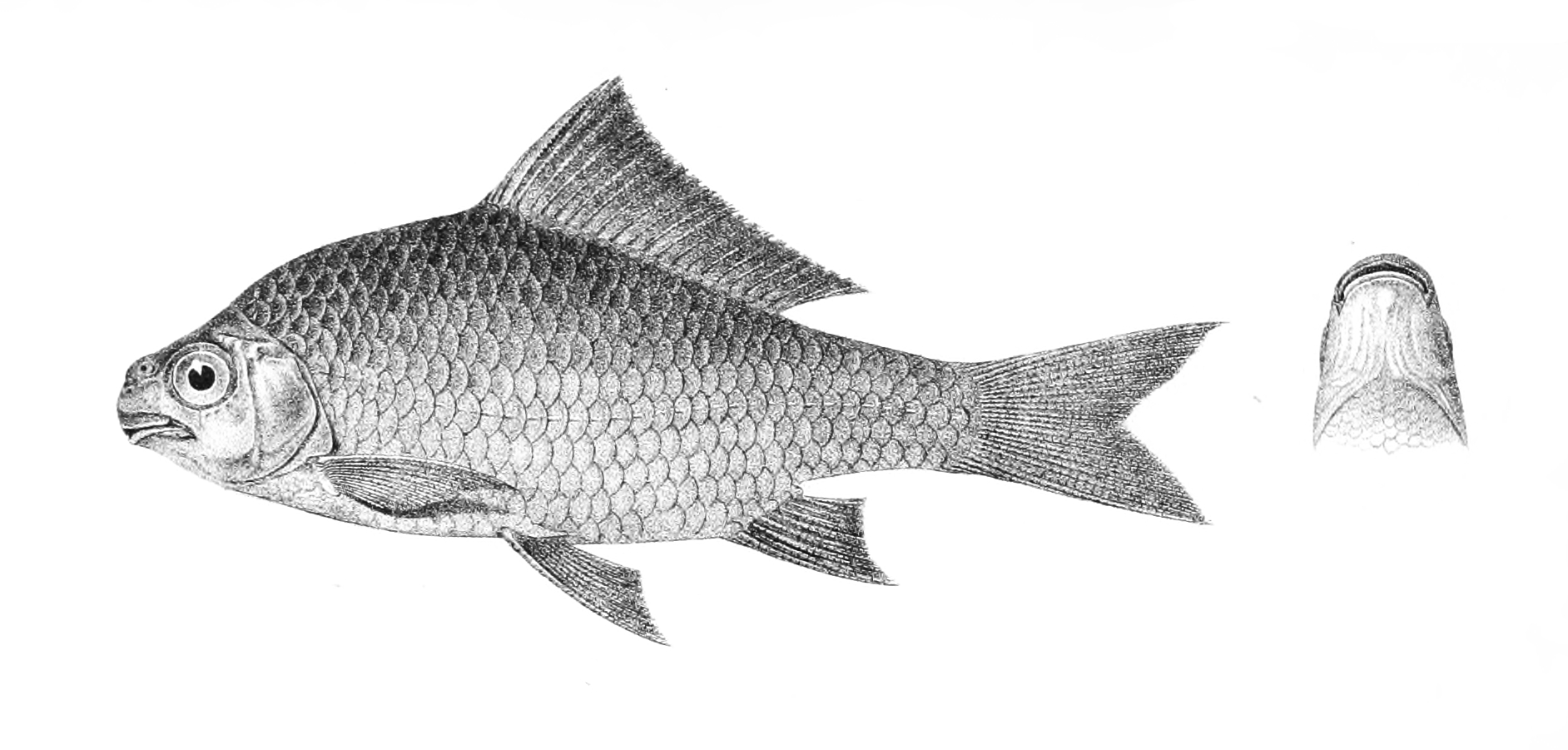

Conservation status
- Data Deficient (IUCN 3.1)

Scientific classification
- Kingdom: Animalia
- Phylum: Chordata
- Class: Actinopterygii
- Order: Cypriniformes
- Family: Cyprinidae
- Genus: Semiplotus
- Species: S. modestus

Binomial name
- Semiplotus modestus F. Day, 1870

= Semiplotus modestus =

Species of fish

Semiplotus modestus is a species of cyprinid in the genus Semiplotus that inhabits India and upper Myanmar. Unsexed males have a maximum length of 20 centimetres (8 in) and it is considered harmless to humans. It is classified as "data deficient" on the IUCN Red List.
