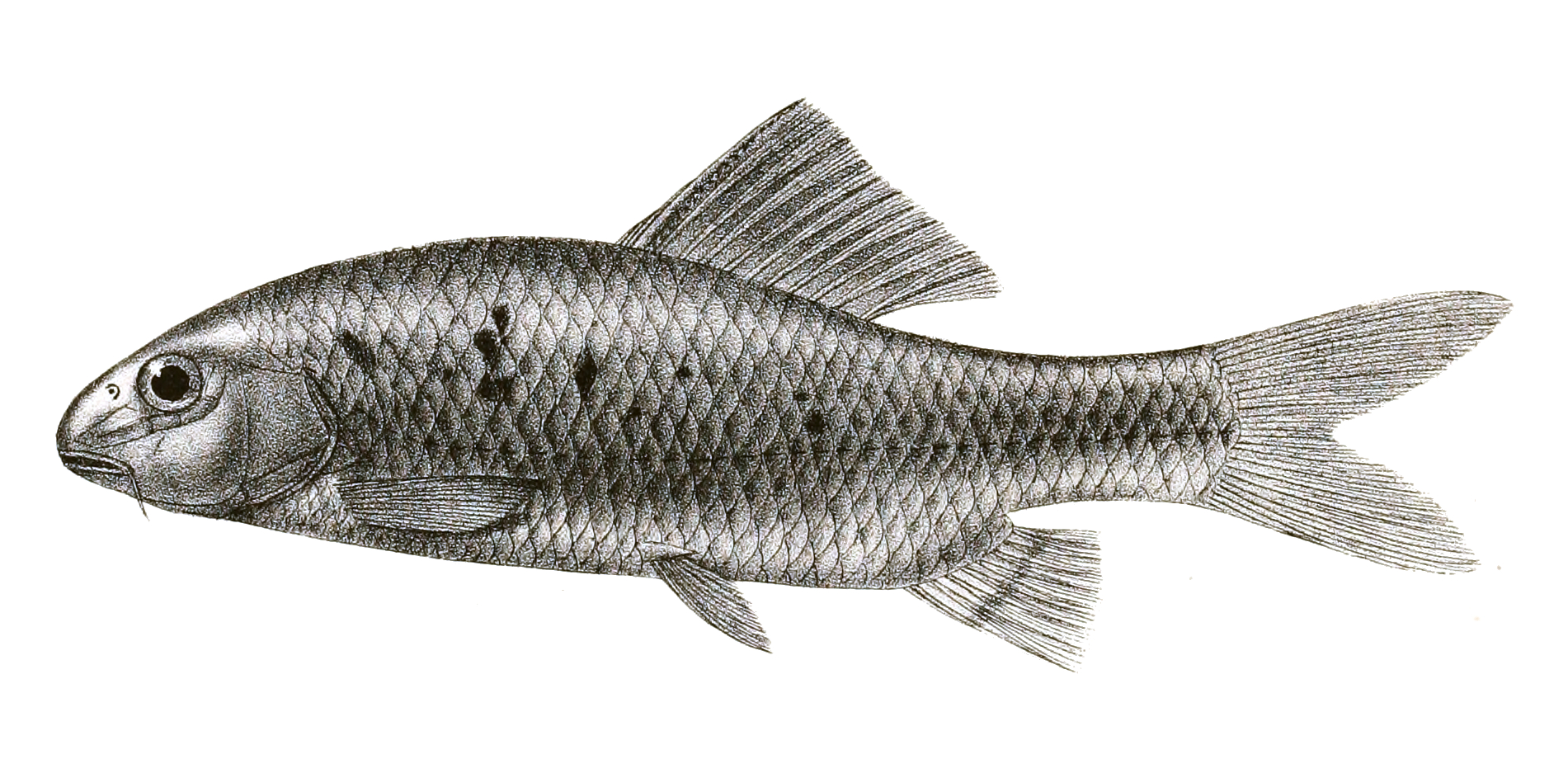

Conservation status
- Least Concern (IUCN 3.1)

Scientific classification
- Kingdom: Animalia
- Phylum: Chordata
- Class: Actinopterygii
- Order: Cypriniformes
- Family: Cyprinidae
- Genus: Cyprinion
- Species: C. watsoni

Binomial name
- Cyprinion watsoni (F. Day, 1872)

Synonyms
- Scaphiodon watsoni Day, 1872; Scaphiodon irregularis Day, 1872; Scaphiodon muscatensis Boulenger, 1888; Cirrhina afghana Günther, 1889; Barbus bampurensis Nikolskii, 1900; Cyprinion kirmanense Nikolskii, 1900; Scaphiodon macmahoni Regan, 1906; Scaphiodon baluchiorum Jenkins, 1910; Scaphiodon readingi Hora, 1923; Semiplotus dayi Fowler, 1958

= Cyprinion watsoni =

Species of fish

Cyprinion watsoni, the Indus lotak, is a species of ray-finned fish in the genus Cyprinion. The original type specimen described as Cyprinion watsoni from the Indus and the populations elsewhere which are included by some authorities in C. watsoni are regarded by others as separate species Cypirion muscatensis from Oman and the United Arab Emirates and Cyprinion microphthalmum from Iran, Afghanistan and Pakistan.

== Footnotes ==
- Froese, Rainer; Pauly, Daniel (eds.). "Cyprinion watsoni". FishBase.
