= Schizocypris altidorsalis =

Conservation status
- Least Concern (IUCN 3.1)

Scientific classification
- Kingdom: Animalia
- Phylum: Chordata
- Class: Actinopterygii
- Order: Cypriniformes
- Family: Cyprinidae
- Genus: Schizocypris
- Species: S. altidorsalis

Binomial name
- Schizocypris altidorsalis Bianco & Bănărescu, 1982

Species of cyprinid

Schizocypris altidorsalis, common name gorgak, is a species of cyprinid in the genera Schizocypris. It inhabits Sistan, Iran. It is classified as "least concern" by the IUCN Red List.
