= Schizocypris ladigesi =

Scientific classification
- Domain: Eukaryota
- Kingdom: Animalia
- Phylum: Chordata
- Class: Actinopterygii
- Order: Cypriniformes
- Family: Cyprinidae
- Genus: Schizocypris
- Species: S. ladigesi

Binomial name
- Schizocypris ladigesi M. S. Karaman, 1969

Species of fish

Schizocypris ladigesi is a species of cyprinid in the genus Schizocypris. It inhabits Afghanistan's Kankae river and is considered harmless to humans.
