= Cyprinion milesi =

Scientific classification
- Kingdom: Animalia
- Phylum: Chordata
- Class: Actinopterygii
- Order: Cypriniformes
- Family: Cyprinidae
- Genus: Cyprinion
- Species: C. milesi

Binomial name
- Cyprinion milesi (F. Day, 1880)

Synonyms
- Barbus milesi Day, 1880; Scaphiodon daukesis Zugmayer, 1912; Barbus baschakirdi Holly, 1929

Species of fish

Cyprinion milesi is a species of ray-finned fish in the genus Cyprinion from Pakistan, Afghanistan and Iran.

== Footnotes ==
- Froese, Rainer; Pauly, Daniel (eds.). "Cyprinion milesi". FishBase.
