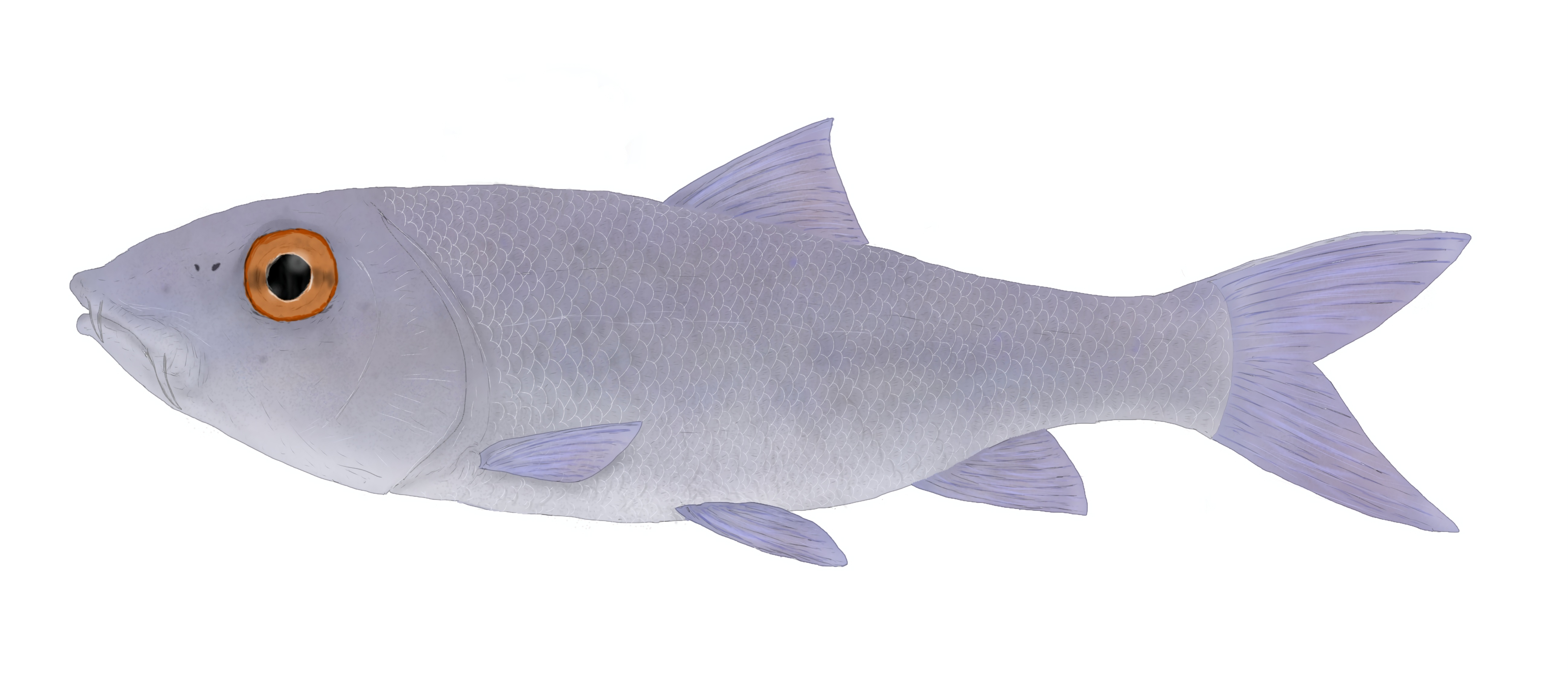

Scientific classification
- Kingdom: Animalia
- Phylum: Chordata
- Class: Actinopterygii
- Division: Teleostei
- Order: Cypriniformes
- Family: Cyprinidae
- Subfamily: Barbinae
- Genus: †Eocyprinus; Sanders, 1934
- Species: †E. sumatranus

Binomial name
- †Eocyprinus sumatranus Sanders, 1934

= Eocyprinus =

Eocyprinus Temporal range: Eocene

Extinct genus of fishes

Eocyprinus is a genus of Eocene-aged cypriniform fish, thought to be a cyprinid of the subfamily Barbinae, recovered from the presumed Eocene-aged Sangkarewang Formation, Sumatra, Indonesia. According to the original describer (Sanders, 1934), there were 41 specimens found with one additional specimen (G192-1900) from the Utrecht collections (not verified). All of these specimens are deemed lost thus preventing further studies of the taxon. The original describer wrote several characteristics that distinguish Eocyprinus from other cyprinoids in the Sangkarewang, which are head length 30% of standard length, dorsal fin with no denticles that have 3 unbranched rays, anal fin with 3 unbranched rays, and three pointed pharyngeal teeth.
