= Paracapoeta barroisi =

Conservation status
- Endangered (IUCN 3.1)

Scientific classification
- Kingdom: Animalia
- Phylum: Chordata
- Class: Actinopterygii
- Order: Cypriniformes
- Family: Cyprinidae
- Genus: Paracapoeta
- Species: P. barroisi

Binomial name
- Paracapoeta barroisi (Lortet, 1894)

Synonyms
- Barbus barroisi (Lortet, 1894); Capoeta barroisi Lortet, 1894

Species of fish

Paracapoeta barroisi, also known as the Orontes scraper or Tigris barb, is a species of freshwater cyprinid fish from the Near East. This species is up to 20 cm (7.9 in) long and has sides with brownish spots irregularly arranged in the upper half of the body.

Its distribution was previously thought to comprise the whole Tigris–Euphrates basin and extend to Iran. More recently, this species is thought to be restricted to a small region of the Orontes River basin in Turkey and Syria, and it is now considered endangered.
