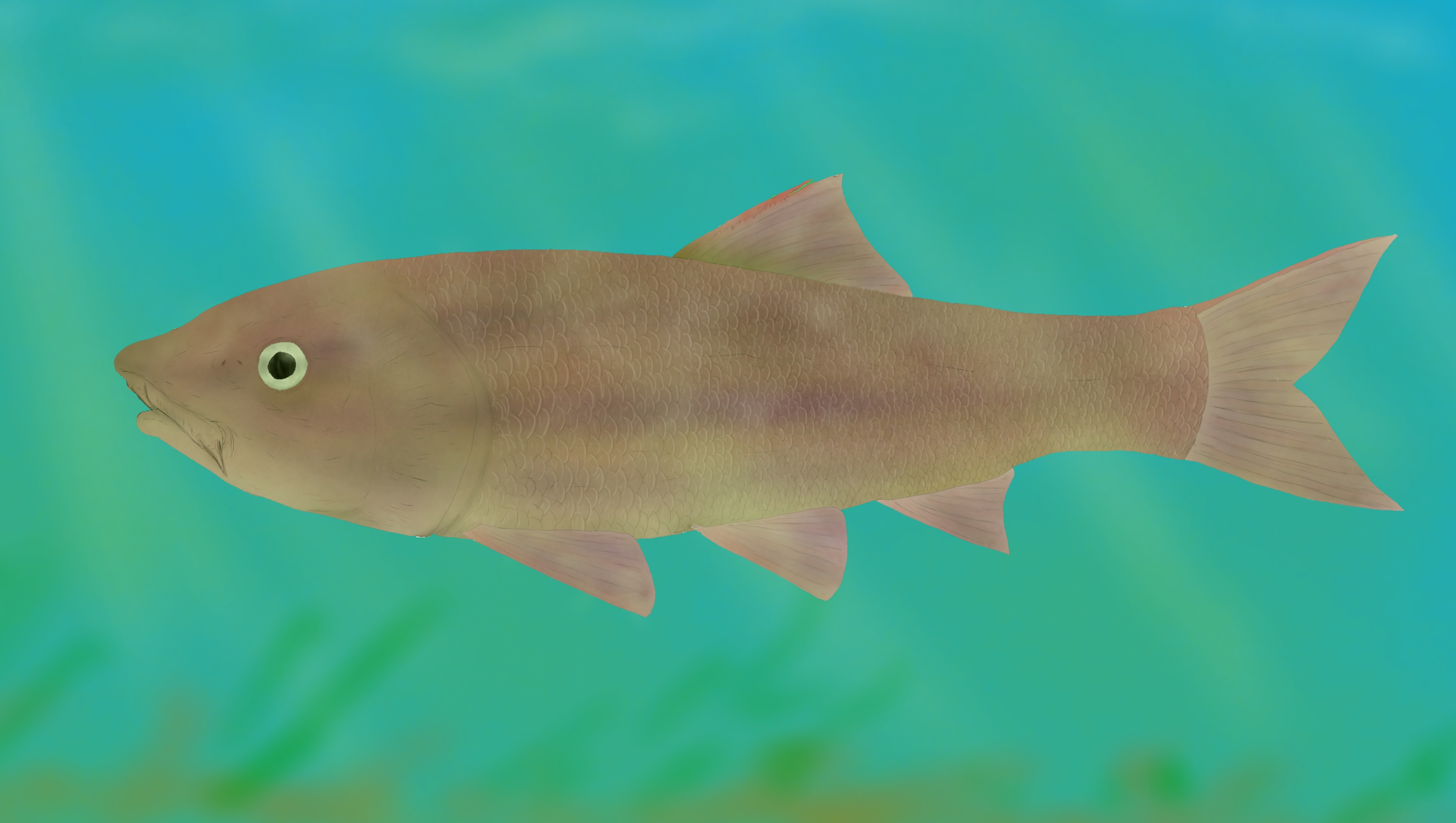

Scientific classification
- Kingdom: Animalia
- Phylum: Chordata
- Class: Actinopterygii
- Order: Cypriniformes
- Family: Cyprinidae
- Subfamily: Smiliogastrinae
- Genus: †Pauciuncus; Murray, 2020
- Species: †P. bussyi

Binomial name
- †Pauciuncus bussyi (Sanders, 1934)

= Pauciuncus =

Pauciuncus Temporal range: Eocene

Extinct genus of ray-finned fish

Pauciuncus is a genus of small cypriniforms tentatively Smiliogastrinae that lived in Sangkarewang Formation during Eocene epoch. It was previously known as Puntius bussyi. Four surviving specimens showed this taxa only grow to around 3–4 cm in standard length (SL) with fairly large cycloid scales.

== Description ==
Like most Sangkarewang cyprinoids, the head is large that take up to 33% of the SL. All of the surviving specimens head are crushed hence they are quite hard to be describe precisely. The frontal bones form the majority of the skull roof with the posterior edge twice as wide as the anterior one. For the jaws, preserved parts show that the maxilla is quite robust while the mandible is quite deeep and short. There are three rows of pharygenal teeth that have conical shape.

For opercle part, the opercle is large and about one and a half times taller than wide with gently curved ventral part and rounded anteroventral tip. On the other hand, preopercle has a shape similar to a boomerang. As for the pectoral fins, they have 13–14 rays with short and stout postcleithrum. The pelvis fin is also fin that contain around nine rays. The dorsal fin have fewer than a dozen robust, well-spaced, hooked denticles along the posterior edge of the largest unbranched ray of the dorsal fin (hence the name 'Pauciuncus' which mean "few barb/hook"). Moving to the rear end, Pauciuncus anal fin have around three unbranched rays and six branched one. The ratio of anal fins to head length is much smaller compare to other Sangkarewang cyprinoids.
