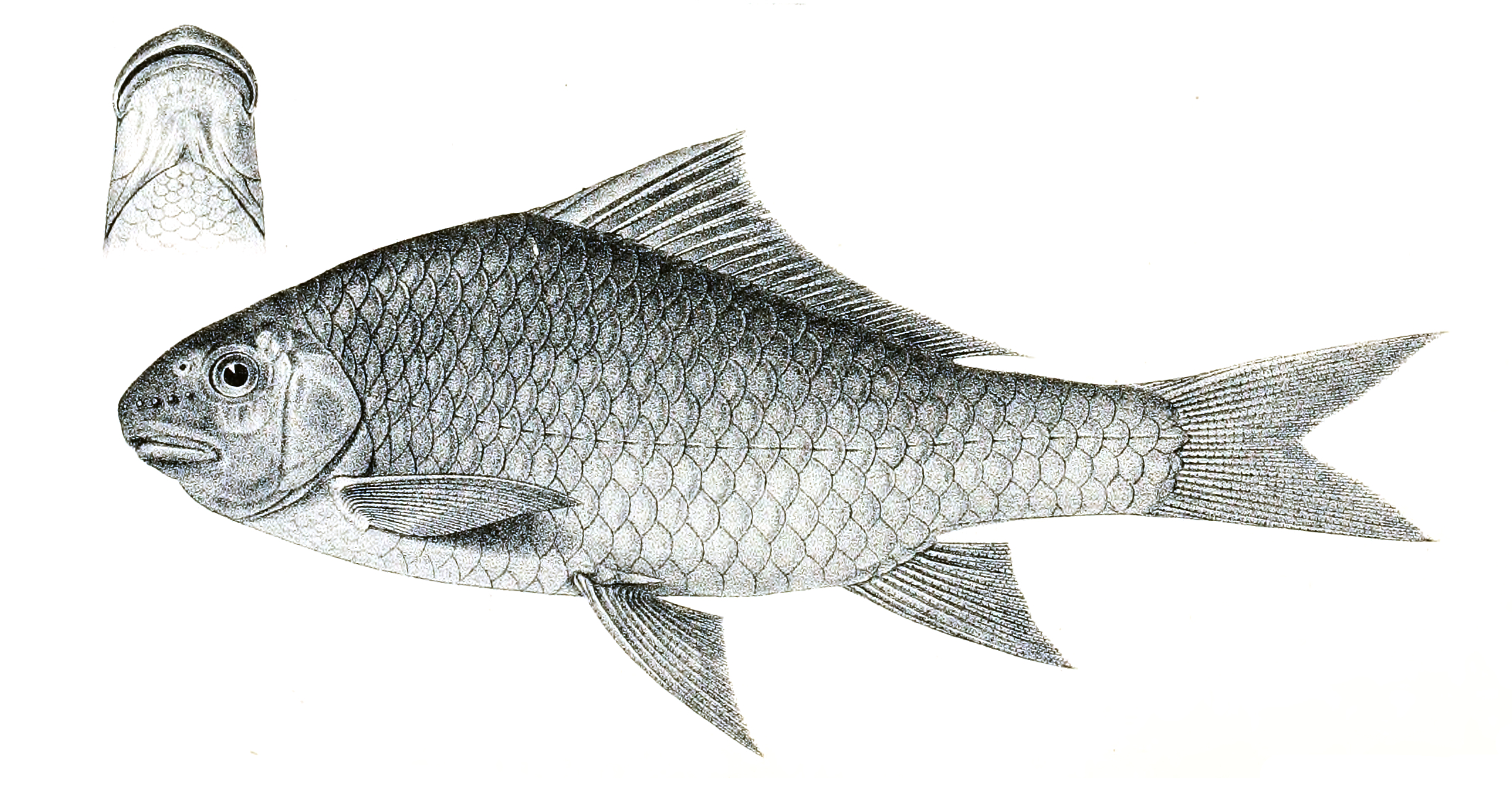

Conservation status
- Vulnerable (IUCN 3.1)

Scientific classification
- Kingdom: Animalia
- Phylum: Chordata
- Class: Actinopterygii
- Order: Cypriniformes
- Family: Cyprinidae
- Genus: Semiplotus
- Species: S. semiplotus

Binomial name
- Semiplotus semiplotus McClelland, 1839

Synonyms
- Cyprinus semiplotus McClelland, 1839; Cyprinion semiplotum (McClelland, 1839); Semiplotus macclellandi Bleeker, 1860

= Assamese kingfish =

Species of fish

The Assamese kingfish (Sempilotus semiplotus) is a species of cyprinid fish native to southern Asia where it occurs in fresh waters of India, Nepal, Bhutan and Myanmar. This species can reach a length of 60 centimetres (24 in) TL. It is of minor importance to local commercial fisheries.
