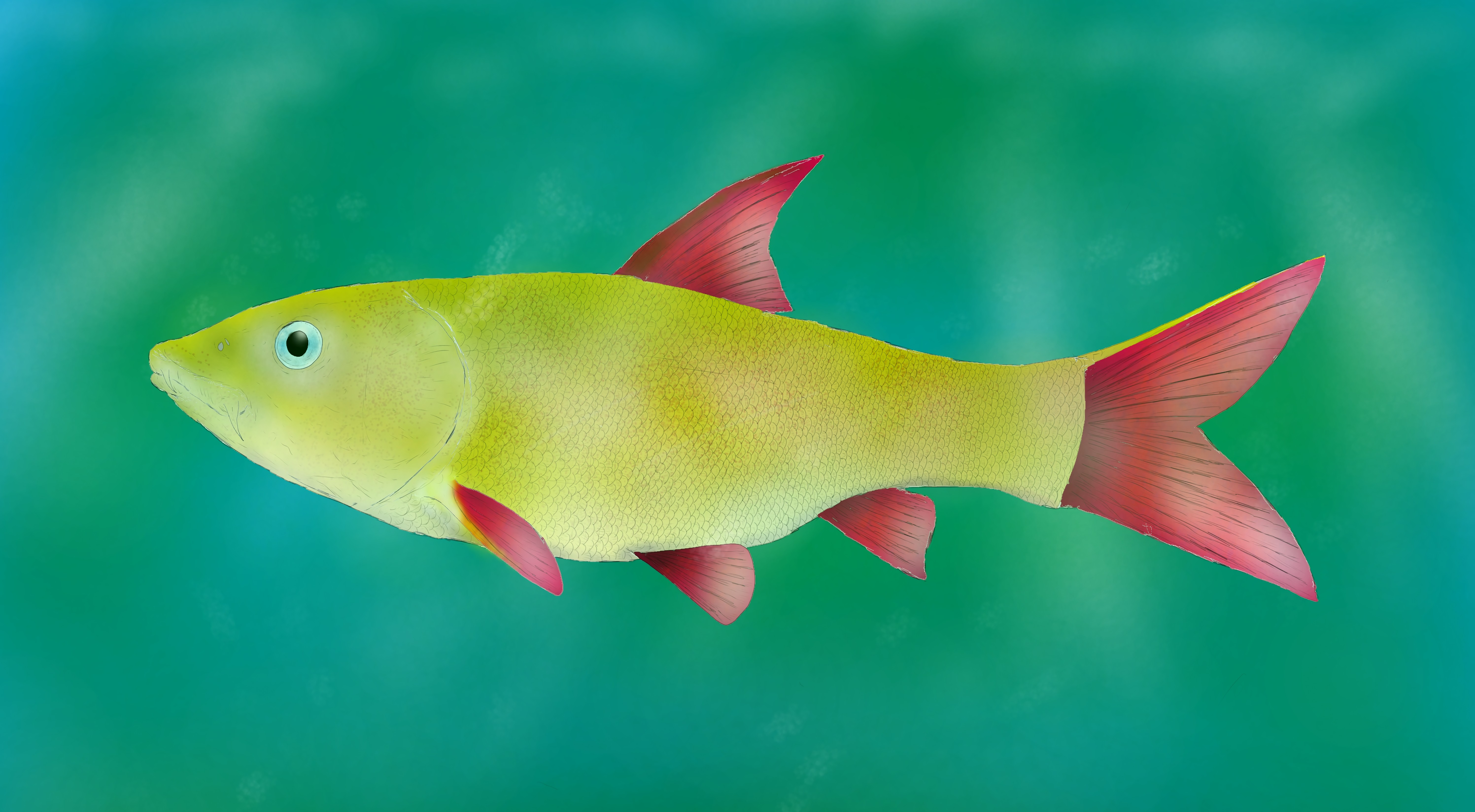

Scientific classification
- Kingdom: Animalia
- Phylum: Chordata
- Class: Actinopterygii
- Order: Cypriniformes
- Family: Cyprinidae
- Subfamily: Barbinae
- Genus: †Hadromos; Murray, 2020

Type species
- Hadromos sandersae Murray, 2020

= Hadromos =

Hadromos Temporal range: Eocene

Genus of fishes

Hadromos is a genus of Barbinae that lived in Sangkarewang Formation (Sumatra) during the Eocene epoch. It is quite large compare to many of its contemporaneous barb reaching 15.8 cm (6.2 in) in standard length and 19.4 cm (7.6 in) for the total body length. The relatively complete fossils show that Hadromos have a proportionally large head that take up to 37% of its standard length (57 mm (2.2 in)). The preserved scale show that Hadromos have circular scales on their body but none can be found on the head. One of its autapomorphy can be found on the dorsal fin which have 100 or more fine serrations sitting on the posterior part of its longest unbranched ray. Moving to the rear part, Hadromos anal fin have a short-based anal fin lacking a strong spine-like unbranched ray that can be found in Cyprinae. For the caudal fin, the shape is deeply forked and occupy roughly a quarter of Hadromos total length.
