= Schizocypris brucei =

Conservation status
- Vulnerable (IUCN 3.1)

Scientific classification
- Kingdom: Animalia
- Phylum: Chordata
- Class: Actinopterygii
- Order: Cypriniformes
- Family: Cyprinidae
- Genus: Schizocypris
- Species: S. brucei

Binomial name
- Schizocypris brucei Regan, 1914

Species of cyprinid

Schizocypris brucei is a species of cyprinid of the genus Schizocypris. Its common name is the Waziristan snowtrout and it inhabits Iran, Pakistan and Afghanistan. It was described in 1914. Its maximum length is 14.0 centimetres (5.5 in) and it is considered harmless to humans.
