= Cyprinion acinaces =

Conservation status
- Least Concern (IUCN 3.1)

Scientific classification
- Kingdom: Animalia
- Phylum: Chordata
- Class: Actinopterygii
- Order: Cypriniformes
- Family: Cyprinidae
- Genus: Cyprinion
- Species: C. acinaces

Binomial name
- Cyprinion acinaces Banister & M. A. Clarke, 1977

Species of fish

Cyprinion acinaces is a species of ray-finned fish in the genus Cyprinion. This species has two subspecies Cyprinion acinaces acinaces and Cyprinion acinaces hijazi, though the validity of the latter is in doubt. If C. a. hijazi is invalid, then C. acinaces would be monotypic. The species occurs from western, central and northern Saudi Arabia to Yemen.

== Footnotes ==
- Froese, Rainer; Pauly, Daniel (eds.). "Cyprinion acinaces". FishBase.
