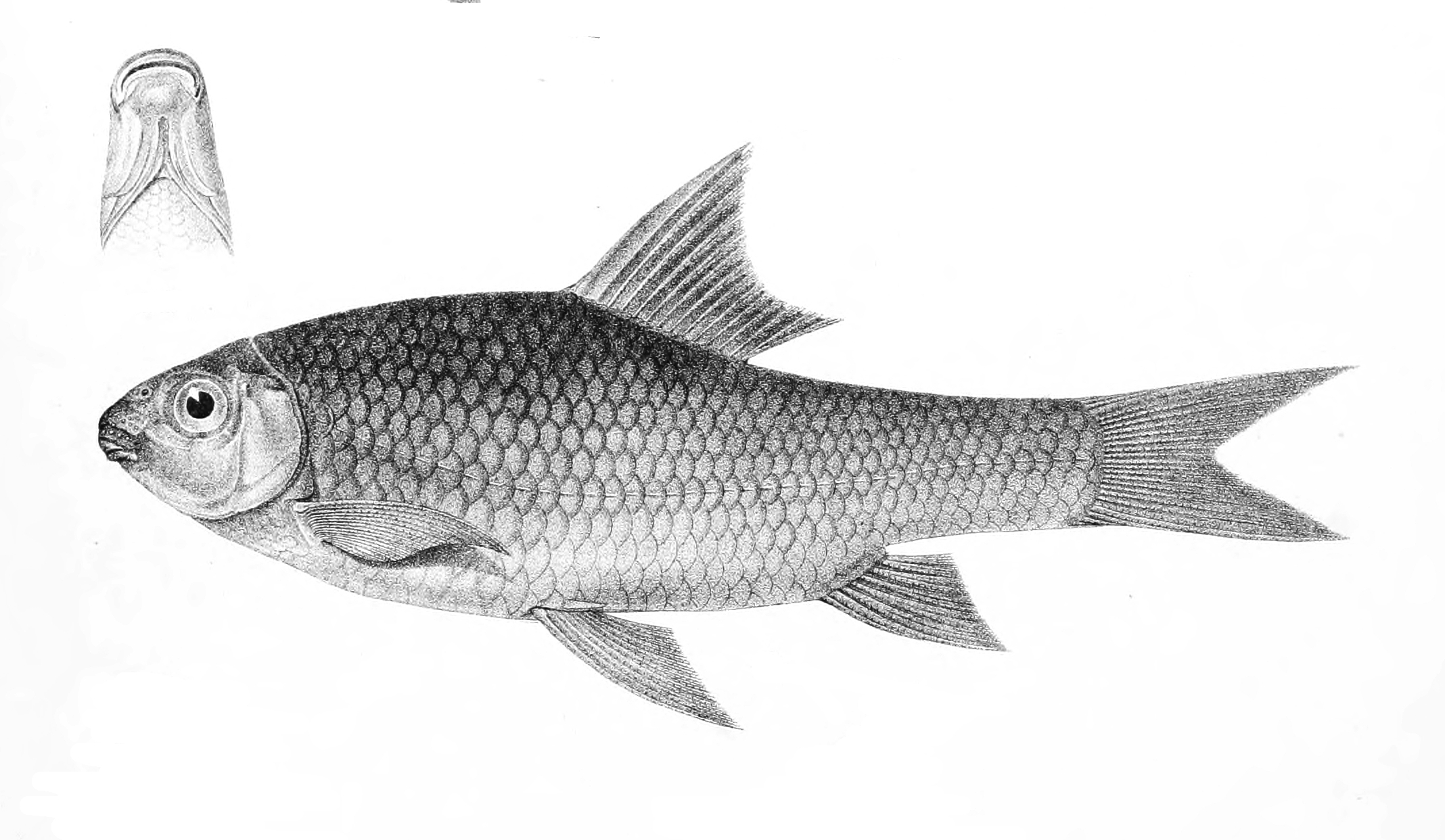

Conservation status
- Least Concern (IUCN 3.1)

Scientific classification
- Kingdom: Animalia
- Phylum: Chordata
- Class: Actinopterygii
- Order: Cypriniformes
- Family: Cyprinidae
- Subfamily: Barbinae
- Genus: Kantaka; Hora, 1942
- Species: K. brevidorsalis

Binomial name
- Kantaka brevidorsalis (F. Day, 1873)

Synonyms
- Semiplotus brevidorsalis Day, 1873; Cyprinion brevidorsalis (Day, 1873); Osteochilichthys brevidorsalis (Day, 1873); Osteochilus brevidorsalis (Day, 1873); Scaphiodon brevidorsalis (Day, 1873)

= Kantaka barb =

Species of fish

The Kantaka barb (Kantaka brevidorsalis) is a species of cyprinid fish endemic to the Western Ghats, India. It inhabits large streams, and grows to 15.0 cm (5.9 in) TL. It was described by Francis Talbot Day in 1873.
