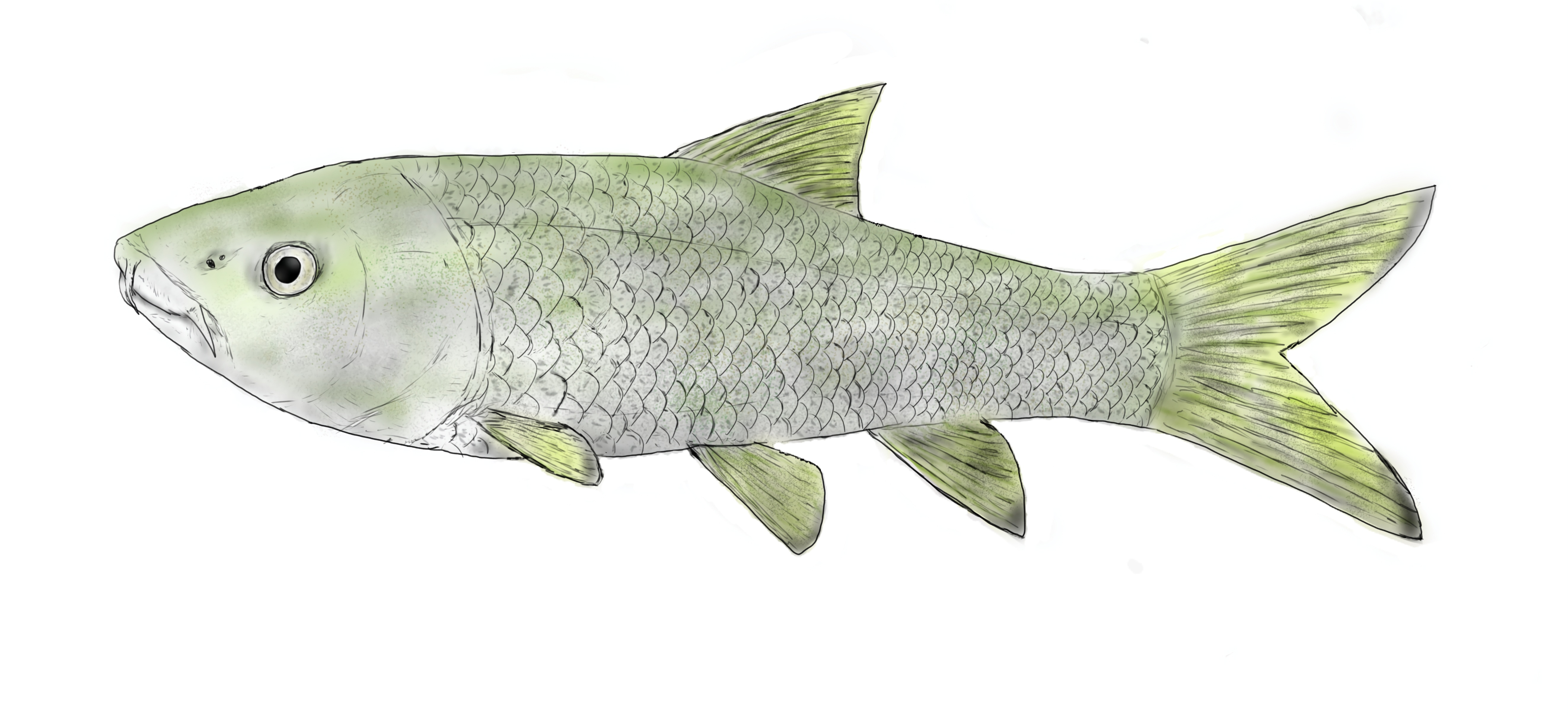

Scientific classification
- Kingdom: Animalia
- Phylum: Chordata
- Class: Actinopterygii
- Order: Cypriniformes
- Family: Cyprinidae
- Subfamily: Barbinae
- Genus: †Sangkarewangia; Murray, 2020
- Species: †S. sumatranus

Binomial name
- †Sangkarewangia sumatranus Murray, 2020

= Sangkarewangia =

Sangkarewangia Temporal range: Eocene

Extinct genus of fishes

Sangkarewangia is a genus of barbine fish that lived in Sangkarewang Formation, West Sumatra during the Eocene epoch. It is known from three specimen and one of them preserved most of the fish body except the head part which is disarticulated. Based from the fossil, Sangkarewangia can be inferred as a small fish with elongated body and proportionally large head. The largest specimen have 7,58 cm standard length and 9 cm total length while the smallest only measured 3 cm in standard length with 1,05 cm. The head occupy 35% of its standard length with the operculum form one-third of the head length. The preserved fossils also showed that Sangkarewangia have deeply forked tail. Its low number of caudal vertebrate (13) combined with total vertebrate number (30–31) are considered as an autapomorphy for this species.
