= Schizocypris =

Scientific classification
- Kingdom: Animalia
- Phylum: Chordata
- Class: Actinopterygii
- Order: Cypriniformes
- Family: Cyprinidae
- Subfamily: Barbinae
- Genus: Schizocypris; Regan, 1914

Type species
- Schizocypris brucei Regan, 1914

Genus of fishes

Schizocypris is a genus of cyprinid fish found in southern and south-western Asia.

== Species ==
There are currently three recognized species in this genus:

- Schizocypris altidorsalis Bianco & Bănărescu, 1982
- Schizocypris brucei Regan, 1914 (Waziristan snowtrout)
- Schizocypris ladigesi M. S. Karaman (sr), 1969
