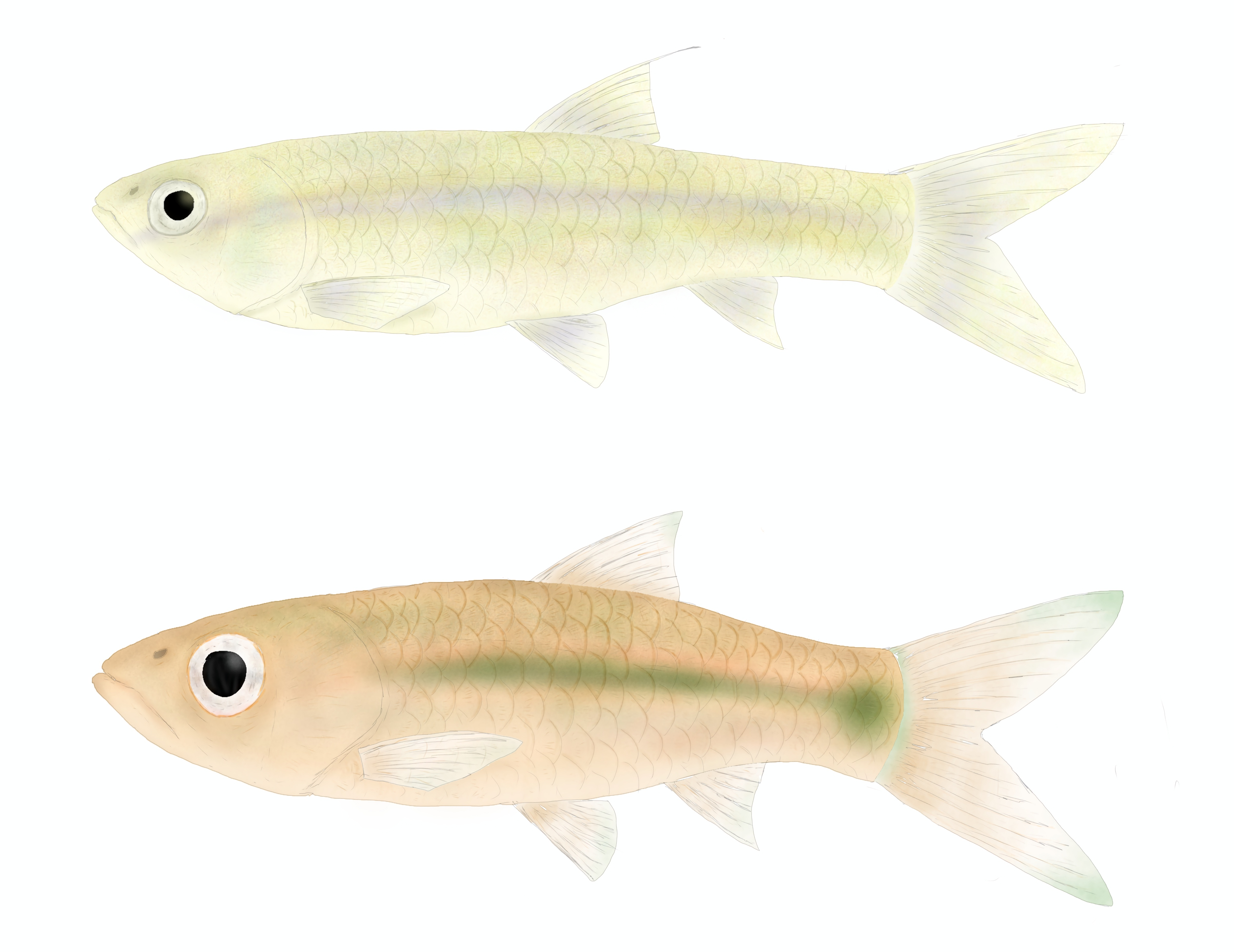
- Reconstruction of R. antiqua (top) and R. mohri

Scientific classification
- Kingdom: Animalia
- Phylum: Chordata
- Class: Actinopterygii
- Division: Teleostei
- Order: Cypriniformes
- Family: Danionidae
- Genus: Rasbora
- Species: †R. antiqua

Binomial name
- †Rasbora antiqua Sanders, 1934

= Rasbora antiqua =

Rasbora antiqua Temporal range: Eocene

Extinct species of fish

Rasbora antiqua is a fossil species of Danionidae, one of the two found in Eocene-aged rock from Sangkarewang Formation. It was described from several specimens that are presumed to be lost. From the original description and surviving photograph, R. antiqua can be distinguished from R. mohri by having relatively shorter head (around quarter of its SL). The placement of this species to the genus Rasbora is still tentative.
