= Semiplotus manipurensis =

Conservation status
- Data Deficient (IUCN 3.1)

Scientific classification
- Kingdom: Animalia
- Phylum: Chordata
- Class: Actinopterygii
- Order: Cypriniformes
- Family: Cyprinidae
- Genus: Semiplotus
- Species: S. manipurensis

Binomial name
- Semiplotus manipurensis Vishwanath & Kosygin, 2000

Species of fish

Semiplotus manipurensis is a species of cyprinid in the genus Semiplotus, that inhabits Manipur, India. Unsexed males have a maximum length of 18.5 centimetres (7.3 in). It is classified as "data deficient" on the IUCN Red List and is considered harmless to humans.
