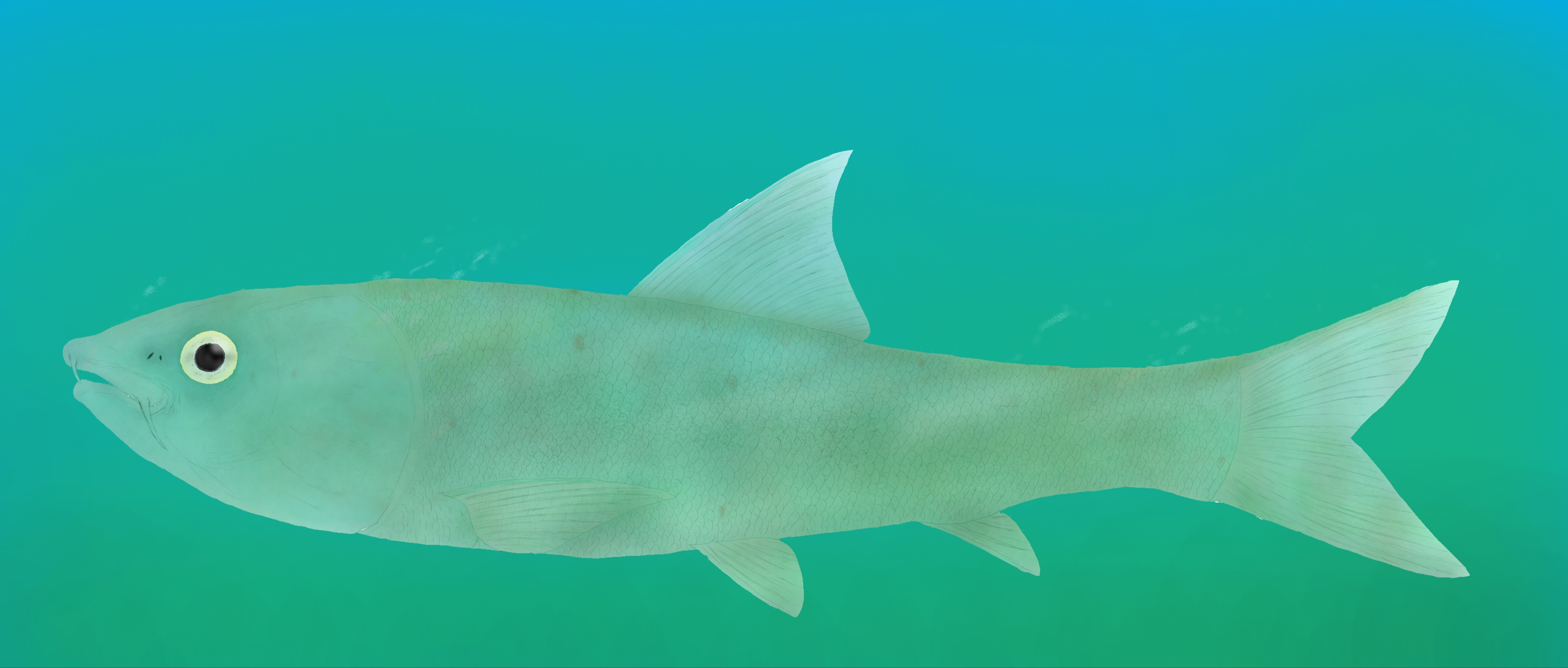

Scientific classification
- Kingdom: Animalia
- Phylum: Chordata
- Class: Actinopterygii
- Order: Cypriniformes
- Family: Cyprinidae
- Subfamily: Barbinae
- Genus: †Padangia; Murray, 2019
- Species: †P. amblyostoma

Binomial name
- †Padangia amblyostoma (von der Marck 1876)

Synonyms
- Thynnichthys amblyostoma von der Marck 1876

= Padangia =

Padangia Temporal range: Eocene

Genus of fishes

Padangia is a genus of Barbinae that lived in Sangkarewang Formation during the Eocene Epoch. Previously known as "Thynnichthys ambylostoma", its name derived from Padang which is the capital of West Sumatra that located near the fossil deposit.

There are more than 500 specimens referred to this taxon with the biggest specimen measuring 12,5 inch/30,5 cm long. Padangia is said to differ from most barbines by its large head that take about one-third of their standard length, cylindrical body with greatest body depth equal to or less than head depth, and strongly rounded and compressed pharyngeal teeth. Its jaws are relatively short and the mouth would be slightly upturned in life.

Other autapomorphies of this taxa are ornamented striated opercle, supraorbital that have few short striations on the posterior fifth of the bone, and preopercle with seven or more canal pore openeings on the ventral limb. Sanders (1934) reported there are 60 cycloid scales covering the lateral line although all of the specimens examined by Murray (2019) don't show these scalation.
