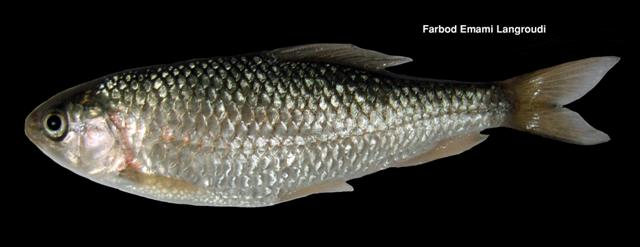
- Cyprinion macrostomum

Scientific classification
- Kingdom: Animalia
- Phylum: Chordata
- Class: Actinopterygii
- Order: Cypriniformes
- Family: Cyprinidae
- Subfamily: Barbinae
- Genus: Cyprinion; Heckel, 1843

Type species
- Cyprinion macrostomus Heckel, 1843

Species
- see text.

= Cyprinion =

Genus of fishes

Cyprinion is a genus of ray-finned fish in the family Cyprinidae.

== Species ==
Cyprinion contains the following recognised species:

- Cyprinion acinaces Banister & M. A. Clarke, 1977
- Cyprinion kais Heckel, 1843 (Kais kingfish)
- Cyprinion macrostomum Heckel, 1843 (Tigris kingfish)
- Cyprinion mhalense Alkahem & Behnke, 1983
- Cyprinion microphthalmum (Day, 1880)
- Cyprinion milesi (Day, 1880)
- Cyprinion muscatense (Boulenger, 1888) (Muscat cyprinion)
- Cyprinion tenuiradius Heckel, 1847
- Cyprinion watsoni (Day, 1872)
