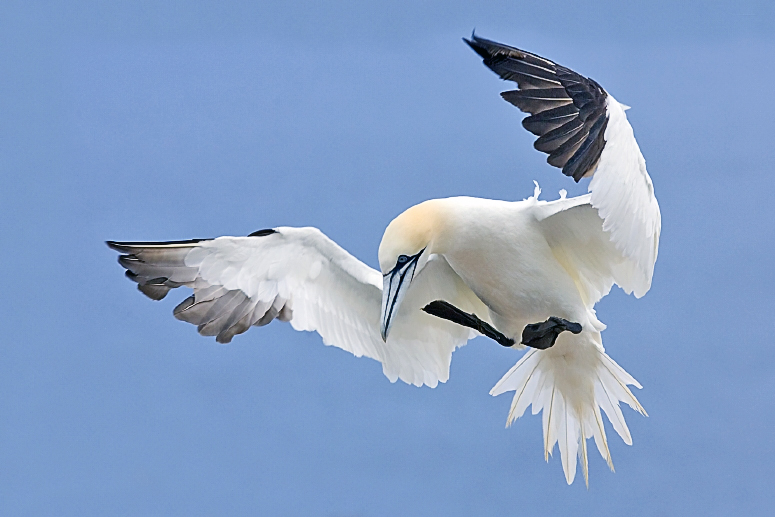
- Northern gannet (Morus bassanus)

Scientific classification
- Kingdom: Animalia
- Phylum: Chordata
- Class: Aves
- Clade: Pelecanes
- Order: Suliformes; Sharpe, 1891

Type species
- Sula leucogaster Boddaert, 1783

Families
- Sulidae; Fregatidae; Phalacrocoracidae; Anhingidae; †Plotopteridae; †Protoplotidae

= Suliformes =

Suliformes Temporal range: Eocene - present 50–0 Ma

Order of birds

The order Suliformes (/ˈsjuːlɪfɔːrmiːz/, dubbed "Phalacrocoraciformes" by Christidis & Boles 2008) is an order of birds that includes gannets, boobies, frigatebirds, cormorants and darters. The order is recognised by the International Ornithologist's Union. Regarding the recent evidence that the traditional Pelecaniformes is polyphyletic, it has been suggested that the group be divided to reflect the true evolutionary relationships; a 2017 study indicated that they are most closely related to Otidiformes (bustards) and Ciconiiformes (storks).

== Systematics and evolution ==
Of the families in Pelecaniformes, only Pelecanidae, Balaenicipitidae, and Scopidae remain. The tropicbird family Phaethontidae has since been moved to their order Phaethontiformes. Genetic analysis seems to show that the Pelecaniformes are actually closely related to the Ardeidae and Threskiornithidae. As for the Suliformes, they are distantly related to the current Pelecaniformes. According to Hackett et al. (2008), loons, penguins, storks, and as well as Suliformes and Pelecaniformes, all seem to have evolved from a common ancestor. The proposed waterbird superorder has been suggested.

In their landmark 2008 work Systematics and Taxonomy of Australian Birds, Australian ornithologists Les Christidis and Walter E. Boles coined the name Phalacrocoraciformes for the group due to the much greater number of species of cormorants (Phalacrocoracidae) over boobies and gannets (Sulidae). However, this has not been taken up elsewhere.

In 1994, American ornithologist Walter J. Bock wrote that the name Suloidea had been used consistently as a term for a superfamily containing the two families, so therefore "Sulidae" and not "Phalacrocoracidae" should take priority in any arrangement containing the two genera.

In 2010, the AOU adopted the term Suliformes for the taxon. The IOC followed in 2011.

In 1994, Martyn Kennedy and colleagues constructed a behavioural data set, with the resulting tree showing a high level of congruence with existing phylogenies based on genetics or morphology. It showed the darters as sister group to the cormorants and shags, with the gannets and boobies, then pelicans, then frigatebirds and lastly tropicbirds as progressively earlier offshoots.

- Suliformes
  - Fregatidae
  - - Sulidae
    - - Anhingidae
      - Phalacrocoracidae

Cladogram based on Gibb, G.C. et al. (2013)

== Species ==
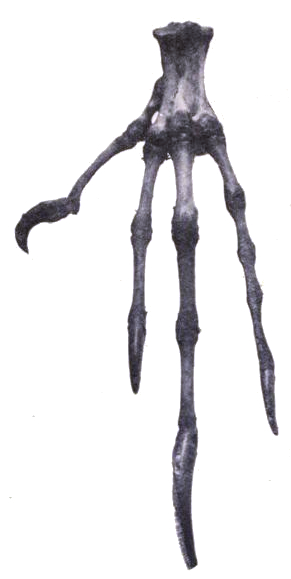
Bones of the left foot of Fregata aquila showing pectinate edge to mid claw, a characteristic of the Suliformes.

- Fregatidae
  - Magnificent frigatebird or man o'war, Fregata magnificens
  - Ascension frigatebird, Fregata aquila
  - Christmas Island frigatebird, Fregata andrewsi
  - Great frigatebird, Fregata minor
  - Lesser frigatebird, Fregata ariel
- Sulidae
  - Blue-footed booby, Sula nebouxii
  - Peruvian booby, Sula variegata
  - Masked booby, Sula dactylatra
  - Nazca booby, Sula granti
  - Red-footed booby, Sula sula
  - Brown booby, Sula leucogaster
  - Cocos booby, Sula brewsteri
  - Abbott's booby, Papasula abbotti
  - Northern gannet, Morus bassanus
  - Cape gannet, Morus capensis
  - Australasian gannet, Morus serrator

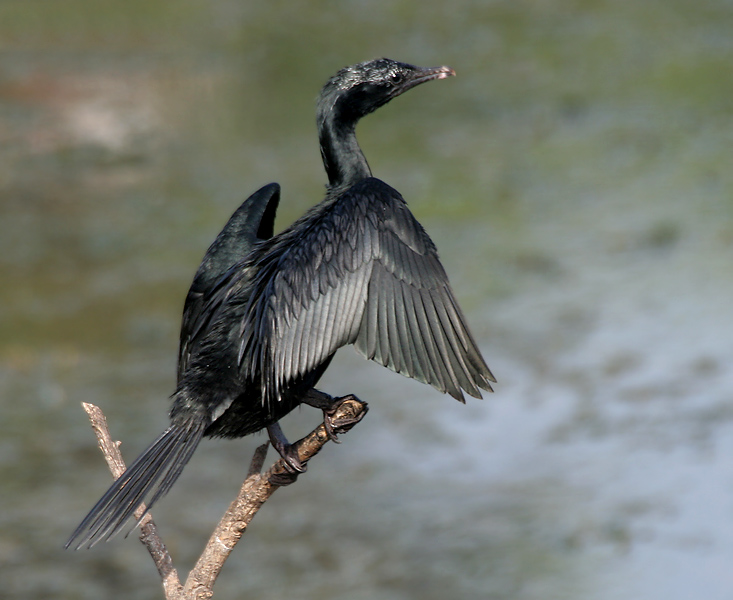
Little cormorant Microcarbo niger

- Phalacrocoracidae
  - Pygmy cormorant, Microcarbo pygmaeus
  - Reed cormorant, Microcarbo africanus
  - Crowned cormorant, Microcarbo coronatus
  - Little cormorant, Microcarbo niger
  - Little pied cormorant, Microcarbo melanoleucos
  - Brandt's cormorant, Urile penicillatus
  - Red-faced cormorant, Urile urile
  - Pelagic cormorant, Urile pelagicus
  - † Spectacled cormorant, Urile perspicillatus (extinct)
  - Red-legged cormorant, Poilkilocarbo gaimardi
  - Bank cormorant, Phalacrocorax neglectus
  - Socotra cormorant, Phalacrocorax nigrogularis
  - Pitt shag, Phalacrocorax featherstoni
  - Spotted shag, Phalacrocorax punctatus
  - Black-faced cormorant, Phalacrocorax fuscescens
  - Australian pied cormorant, Phalacrocorax varius
  - Little black cormorant, Phalacrocorax sulcirostris
  - Indian cormorant, Phalacrocorax fuscicollis
  - Cape cormorant, Phalacrocorax capensis
  - Japanese cormorant, Phalacrocorax capillatus
  - White-breasted cormorant, Phalacrocorax lucidus
  - Great cormorant, Phalacrocorax carbo
  - European shag, Gulosus aristotelis
  - Flightless cormorant, Nannopterum harrisi
  - Neotropic cormorant, Nannopterum brasilianum
  - Double-crested cormorant, Nannopterum auritum
  - Rock shag, Leucocarbo magellanicus
  - Guanay cormorant, Leucocarbo bougainvillii
  - Bounty shag, Leucocarbo ranfurlyi
  - New Zealand king shag, Leucocarbo carunculatus
  - Chatham shag, Leucocarbo onslowi
  - Otago shag, Leucocarbo chalconotus
  - Foveaux shag, Leucocarbo stewarti
  - Auckland shag, Leucocarbo colensoi
  - Campbell shag, Leucocarbo campbelli
  - Imperial shag, Leucocarbo atriceps
  - South Georgia shag, Leucocarbo georgianus
  - Crozet shag, Leucocarbo melanogenis
  - Antarctic shag, Leucocarbo bransfieldensis
  - Kerguelen shag, Leucocarbo verrucosus
  - Heard Island shag, Leucocarbo nivalis
  - Macquarie shag, Leucocarbo purpurascens
- Anhingidae
  - Anhinga or American darter, Anhinga anhinga
  - Oriental darter or Indian darter, Anhinga melanogaster
  - African darter, Anhinga rufa
  - Australasian darter or Australian darter, Anhinga novaehollandiae
