= Barbinae =

Barbinae Temporal range: Eocene–present
- Andalusian barbel (Luciobarbus sclateri)

Scientific classification
- Kingdom: Animalia
- Phylum: Chordata
- Class: Actinopterygii
- Division: Teleostei
- Order: Cypriniformes
- Family: Cyprinidae
- Subfamily: Barbinae; Bleeker, 1859

Genera
- See text

Subfamily of fishes

Barbinae are a subfamily of fish included in the family Cyprinidae. The earliest fossil remains of this subfamily are known from the early-mid Eocene Sangkarewang Formation of Sumatra, Indonesia, with articulated specimens of several extinct genera known.

The taxonomy for this group has not been entirely worked out as some genera historically considered within it are still considered incertae sedis with respect to being a member of the family, and may be included here, while others may be moved to other subfamilies. The most serious problem pertains to the type genus Barbus itself as most of its species (including the type) are better fits for subfamily Cyprininae. A subfamily in a similar position is Labeoninae.

== Genera ==
Barbinae contains the following extant genera:

- Aulopyge Heckel, 1841 — Western Balkans
- Barbus Daudin, 1805 — Eurasia, Africa (but this varies greatly by circumscription)
- Caecocypris Banister & Bunni, 1980 — a cave system in Iraq
- Capoeta Valenciennes, 1842 — West Asia
- Cyprinion Heckel, 1843 — all across West Asia, with easternmost occurrences in the Indus basin
- Kantaka Hora, 1942 — Western Ghats of India
- Luciobarbus Heckel, 1843 — the Iberian Peninsula, the Maghreb, West Asia (especially the Tigris–Euphrates), Southeast Europe, Central Asia
- Paracapoeta Turan, Kaya, Aksu, Bektaş, 2022 — West Asia
- Scaphiodonichthys Vinciguerra, 1890 — Indochina (including Yunnan, China)
- Schizocypris Regan, 1914 — Iran, Afghanistan, Pakistan
- Semiplotus Bleeker, 1860 — South Asia, Myanmar

The following fossil genera are also known:

- †Eocyprinus Sanders, 1934 (early-mid Eocene of Indonesia)
- †Eosytchevskia Prokofiev, 2022 (=†Parabarbus Sytchevskaya, 1986 (preocc.)) (Middle Eocene of Kazakhstan)
- †Hadromos Murray, 2020 (early-mid Eocene of Indonesia)
- †Padangia Murray, 2019 (early-mid Eocene of Indonesia)
- †Sangkarewangia Murray, 2020 (early-mid Eocene of Indonesia)
- †Sundabarbus Murray, 2019 (early-mid Eocene of Indonesia)

=== Chinese molecular view ===
An alternative view common among molecular taxonomists, especially those of Chinese origin, describes the Barbinae (Chinese: 鲃亚科) as a well-supported clade consisting of at least:

- Acrossocheilus
- Barbus, typified by the DNA of Barbus barbus
- Barbodes
- Hampala
- Luciobarbus
- Mystacoleucus
- Onychostoma
- Puntius
- Probarbus
- Sinocyclocheilus
- Spinibarbus
- Tor

And Cyprinus, cladistically speaking. Sinocyclocheilus, Cyprinus, and Carassius are known to share an allotetraploidization event, and at least one of their two subgenomes falls into "Barbinae" in this sense. A more mainstream-compatible view would be to organize these groupings as tribes under Cyprininae, such as in Yang et al. (2010).
