= African knifefish =

The common name African knifefish applies to at least two fish species, including:

- Gymnarchus niloticus. a species in the family Gymnarchidae, capable of producing a weak electrical field
- Xenomystus nigri, a species in the family Notopteridae, sometimes found in the aquarium trade
