= Indonesian featherback =

Conservation status
- Least Concern (IUCN 3.1)

Scientific classification
- Kingdom: Animalia
- Phylum: Chordata
- Class: Actinopterygii
- Order: Osteoglossiformes
- Family: Notopteridae
- Genus: Chitala
- Species: C. borneensis

Binomial name
- Chitala borneensis Bleeker, 1851

Species of ray-finned fish

The Indonesian featherback (Chitala borneensis) is a species of knifefish from freshwater habitats in Southeast Asia. The details of its range are not entirely clear, with FishBase reporting that it occurs in Sumatra, Borneo, and the Malay Peninsula,. In 2024, it was reported to have been found in the Mae Klong basin and the eastern coast of southern Thailand, while Catalog of Fishes considers it endemic to Borneo.

There has been considerable taxonomic confusion between this species and C. lopis; it was argued as recent as 1992 that the two are variants of a single species, but later authorities have recognized them as separate.

C. borneensis reaches at least 56 cm (22 in) in standard length. It is overall pale silvery-golden with many small black spots on the tail fin, anal fin and lower rear part of the body, and a black spot behind the pectoral fin.
