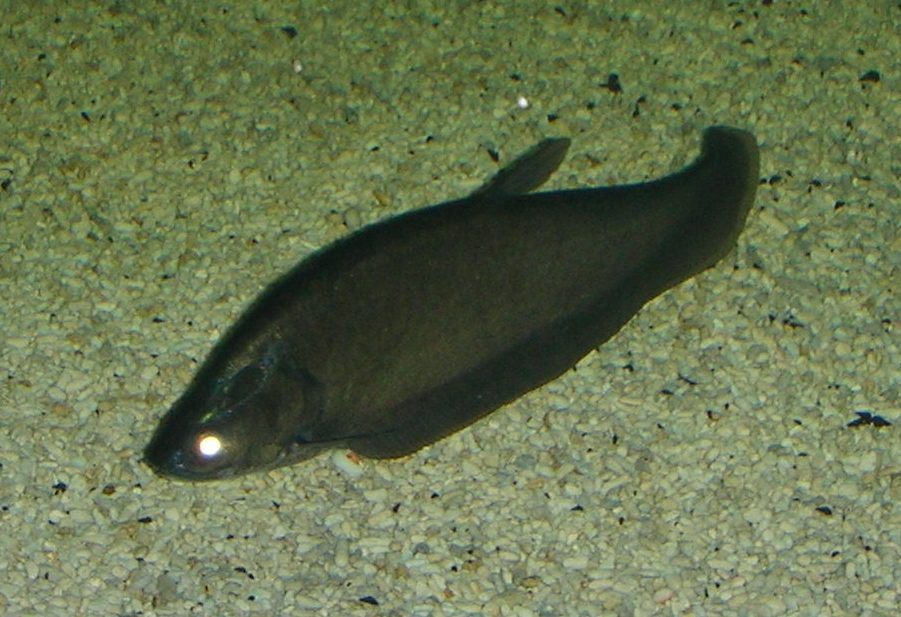

Conservation status
- Least Concern (IUCN 3.1)

Scientific classification
- Kingdom: Animalia
- Phylum: Chordata
- Class: Actinopterygii
- Order: Osteoglossiformes
- Family: Notopteridae
- Genus: Notopterus; Lacépède, 1800
- Species: N. notopterus

Binomial name
- Notopterus notopterus (Pallas, 1769)
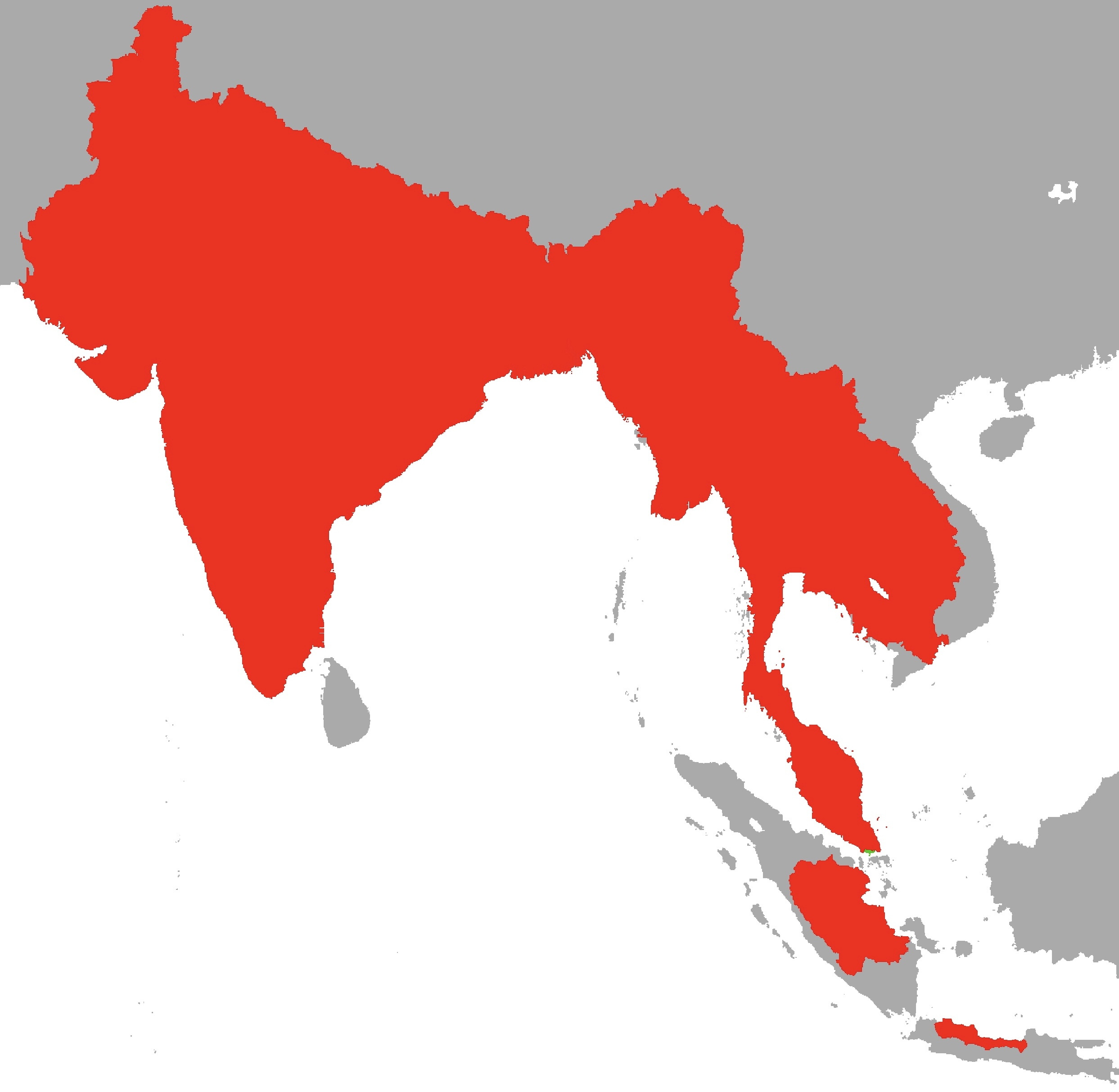
- Red: extant, Green: introduced

Synonyms
- Notopterus bontianus Valenciennes, 1848; Notopterus kapirat Lacepède, 1800; Notopterus osmani Rahimullah & Das, 1991; Notopterus pallasii Valenciennes, 1848

= Bronze featherback =

Species of ray-finned fish

The bronze featherback (Notopterus notopterus) is a ray-finned fish in the family Notopteridae found in South and Southeast Asia. Although primarily found in fresh water, it has been known to enter brackish water. At present, it is the only member of the genus Notopterus, but as currently defined, it is likely a species complex.

== Description ==
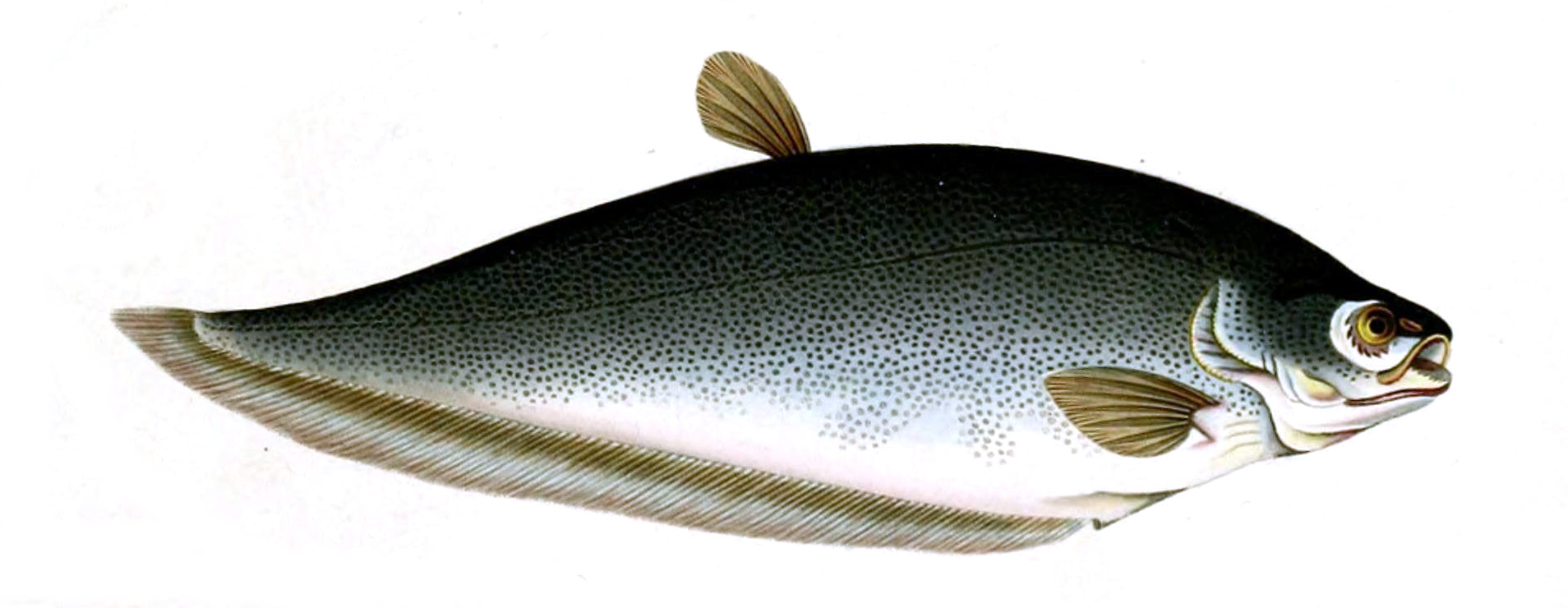

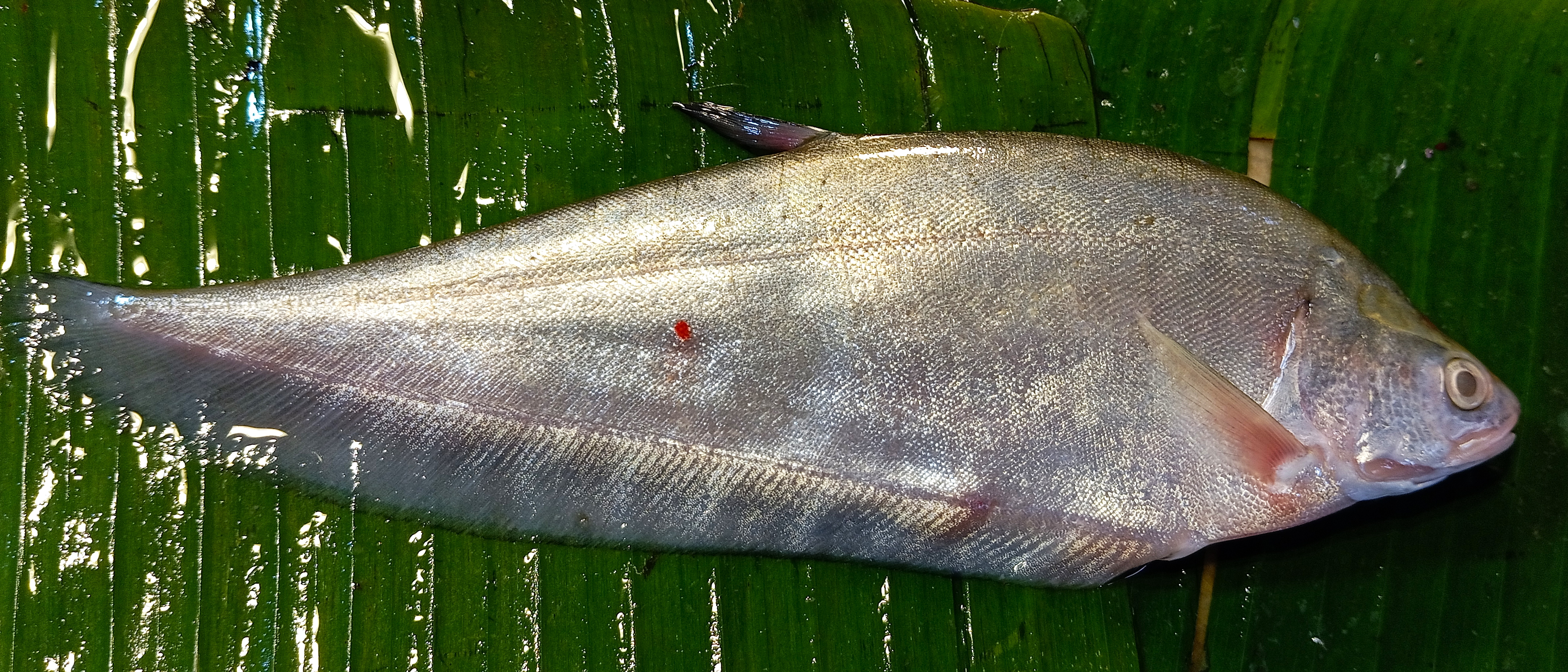
Bronze featherback (Notopterus notopterus), Kolkata, West Bengal, India

Young specimens are a dark bronze-like color that becomes lighter with age. The species reaches a length up to 60 cm (24 in).

The bronze featherback can easily be kept in an aquarium. Popular as food, this fish also appears in a stamp of the Kingdom of Laos.

== As food ==
This fish has been used as food in Southeast Asia since ancient times, and remains an important food item in such countries as Indonesia, Laos, Myanmar (Burma), and Thailand. It is preserved and prepared in different ways.

In Burmese cuisine, the flesh of the bronze featherback, locally known as ngaphe, is used in ngachin, a pressed fish pickle, and is used to make fish paste.

In Thai cuisine, a variety of nam phrik with minced roasted pla salat is eaten along with raw vegetables. It is popular in Khorat - Nakhon Ratchasima. Although much smaller in size, it is similar in appearance to the Chitala ornata, another important fish in Thai cuisine.

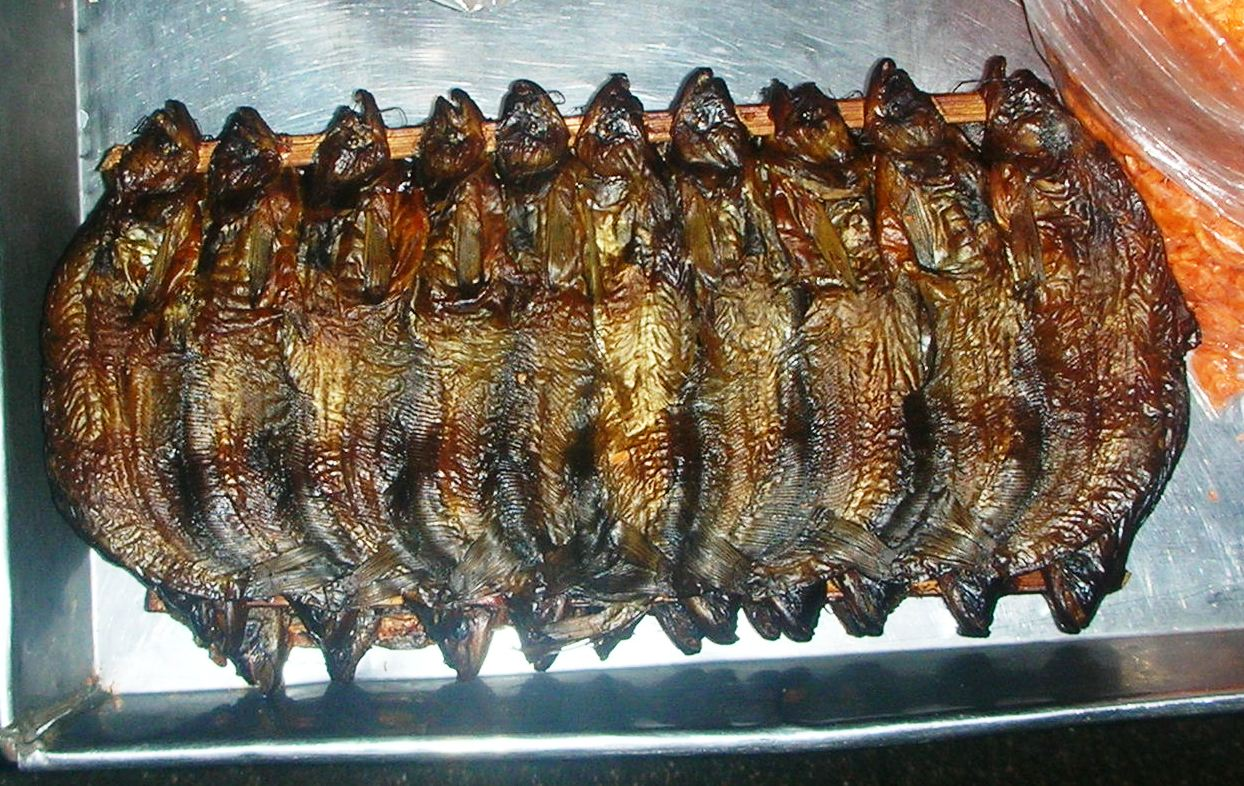
Dried and smoked Pla salat, a Khorat specialty

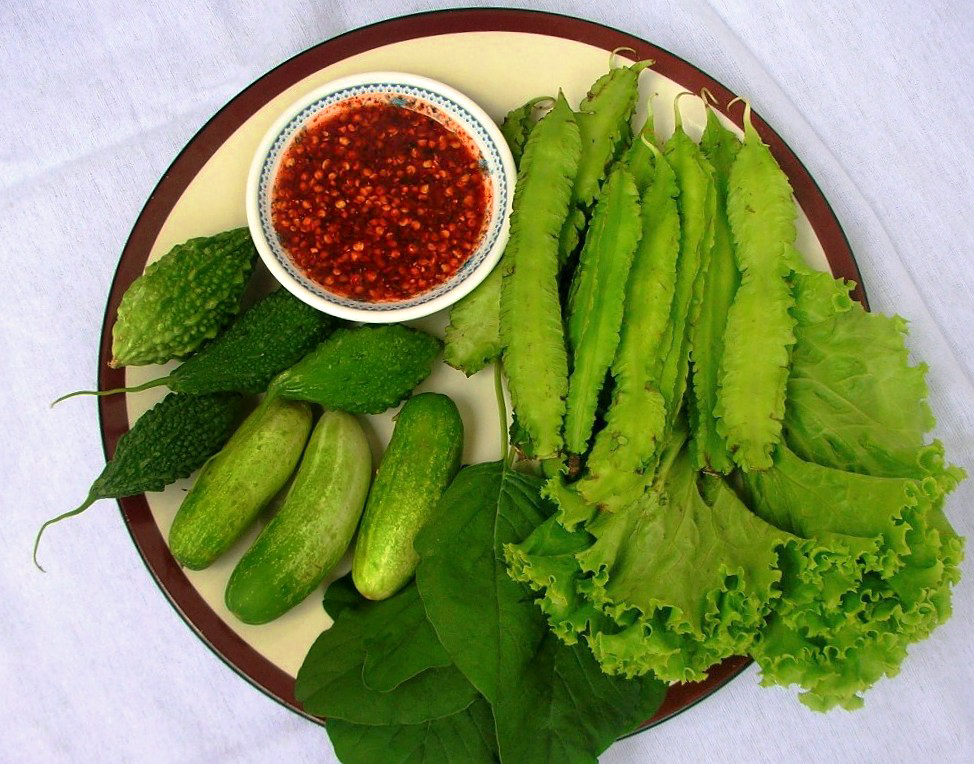
Ready-to-eat nam phrik pla salat pon

== See also ==
- List of Thai ingredients
