= Papyrocranus congoensis =

Congo marble knifefishes

Conservation status
- Least Concern (IUCN 3.1)

Scientific classification
- Kingdom: Animalia
- Phylum: Chordata
- Class: Actinopterygii
- Order: Osteoglossiformes
- Family: Notopteridae
- Genus: Papyrocranus
- Species: P. congoensis

Binomial name
- Papyrocranus congoensis (Nichols & La Monte, 1932)
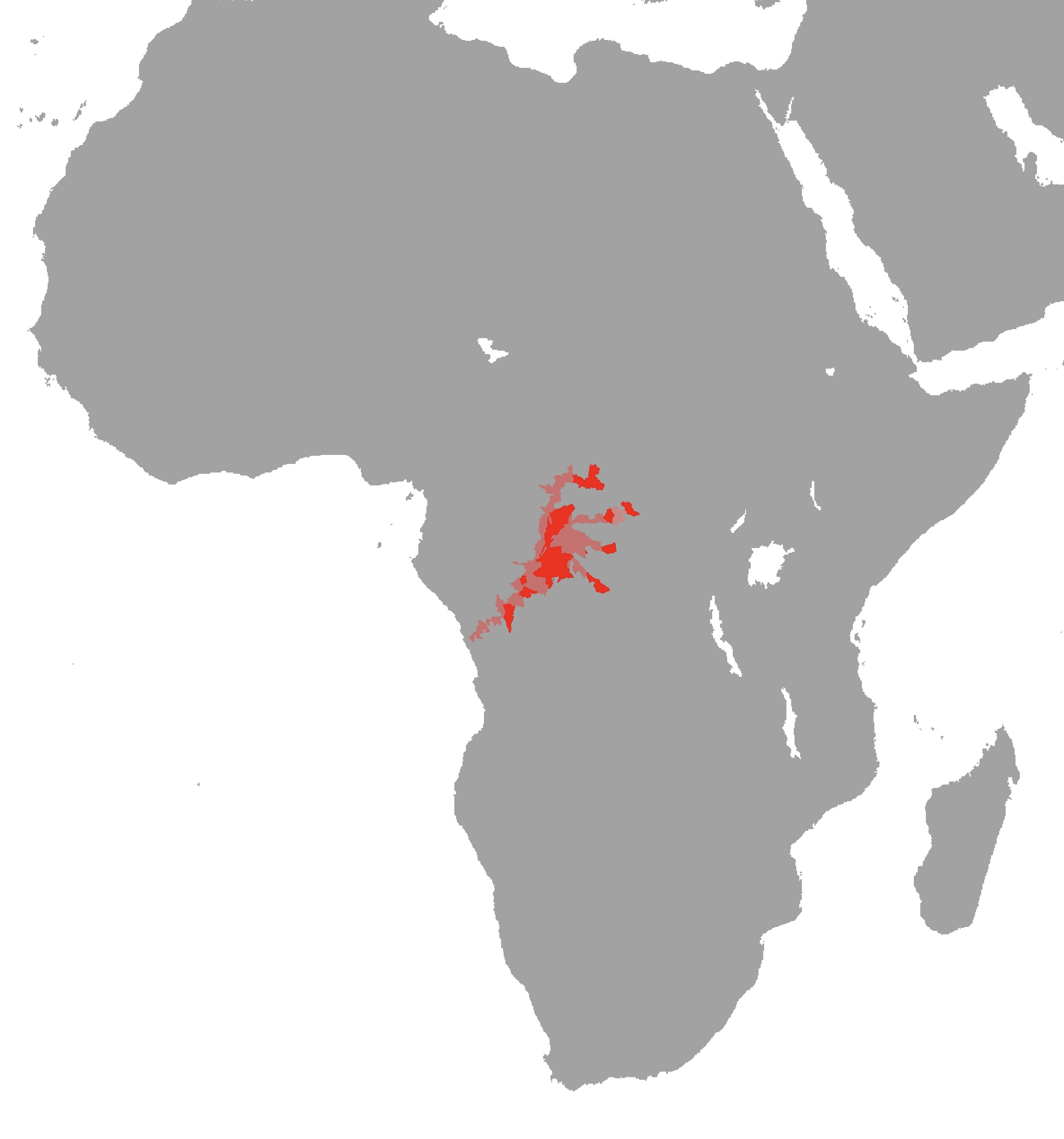

Species of ray-finned fish

Papyrocranus congoensis is a species of ray-finned fish in the family Notopteridae found in the Congo River basin of Africa.
