= Papyrocranus =

Marble knifefishes

Scientific classification
- Kingdom: Animalia
- Phylum: Chordata
- Class: Actinopterygii
- Division: Teleostei
- Order: Osteoglossiformes
- Family: Notopteridae
- Subfamily: Xenomystinae
- Genus: Papyrocranus; Greenwood, 1963

Type species
- Notopterus afer Günther, 1868

Species
- See text
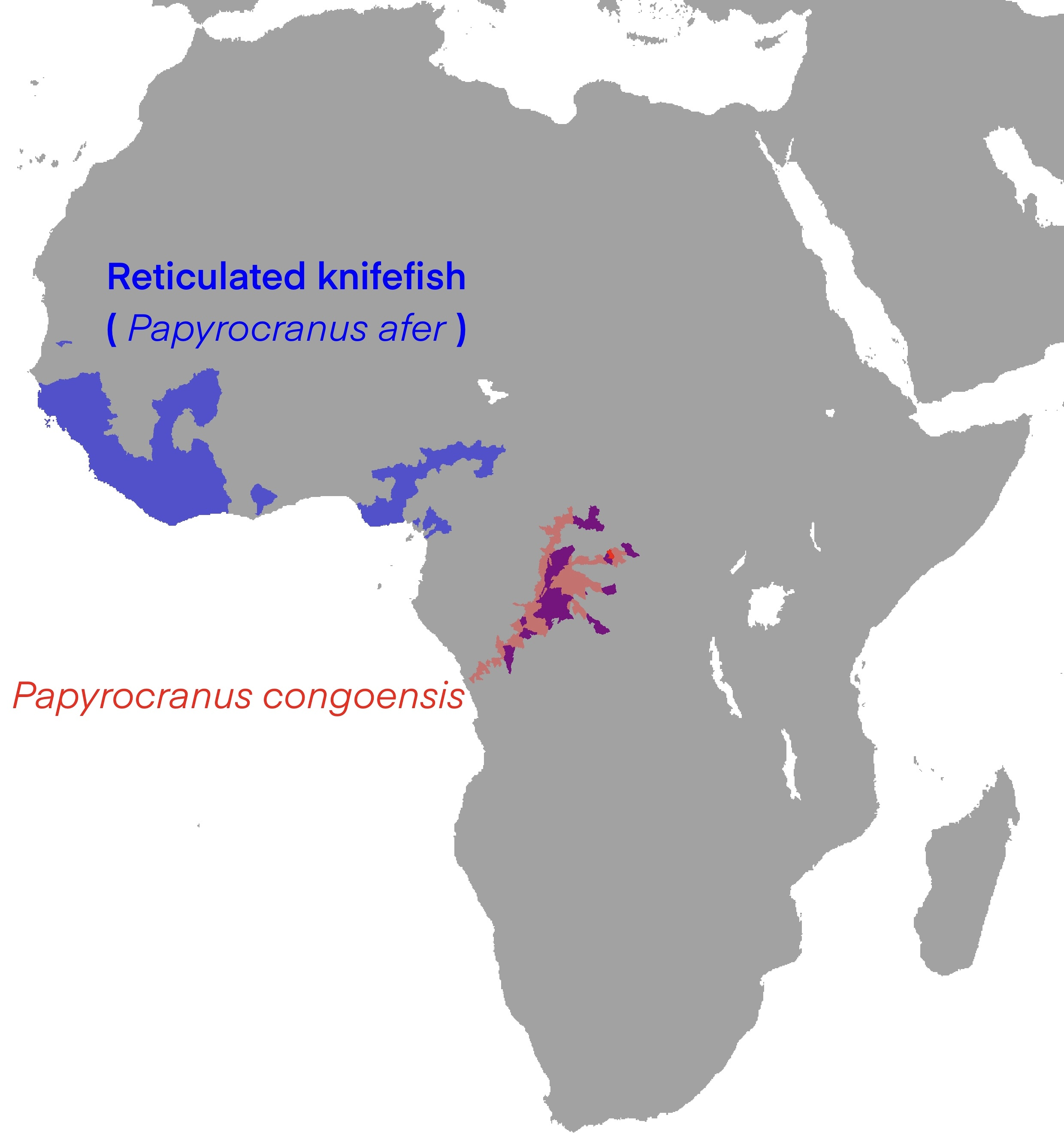
- Red: Papyrocranus congoensis extant, Light red: Papyrocranus congoensis possibly extant, Blue: Papyrocranus afer extant, Purple: both Papyrocranus congoensis and Papyrocranus afer extant

Genus of ray-finned fishes

Papyrocranus is a genus of freshwater fishes in family Notopteridae found in Middle and West Africa.

== Species ==
- Papyrocranus afer (Günther, 1868) (reticulated knifefish)
- Papyrocranus congoensis (Nichols & La Monte, 1932)
