= Papyrocranus afer =

Conservation status
- Least Concern (IUCN 3.1)

Scientific classification
- Kingdom: Animalia
- Phylum: Chordata
- Class: Actinopterygii
- Division: Teleostei
- Order: Osteoglossiformes
- Family: Notopteridae
- Genus: Papyrocranus
- Species: P. afer

Binomial name
- Papyrocranus afer (Günther, 1868)
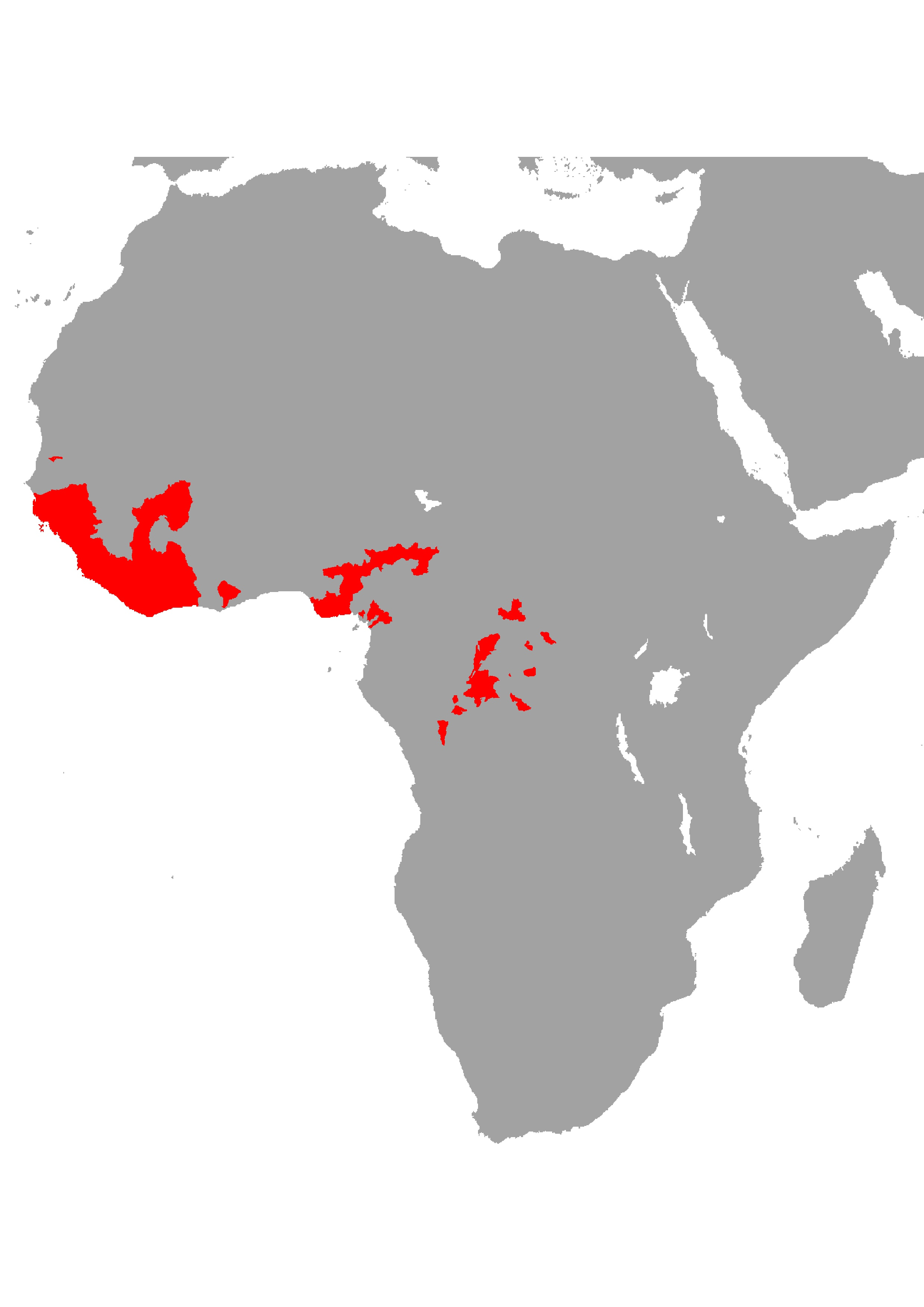

Species of ray-finned fish

The reticulated knifefish (Papyrocranus afer) is a species of freshwater fish in the family Notopteridae, the featherbacks, found in tropical West Africa. It reaches a maximum length of 80 cm (31 in) and a reported weight of 1.3 kg (2.9 lb).

== Description ==
The reticulated knifefish usually grows to a length of about 62 cm (24 in). It is laterally flattened and has very small scales. Like other featherbacks, the dorsal fin projects from its back rather like a feather; this fin has no spines and just two soft rays. The fish has an elongated anal fin with no spines and between 113 and 141 soft rays. This is united with the small caudal fin. There are no pelvic fins. The anal fin provides propulsion, either forwards or backwards, undulating from side to side with a rippling movement.

== Distribution ==
This fish is native to tropical West Africa. It occurs in the Niger basin and other coastal river basins including the Tano River and Pra River basins in Ghana, and the Cross River and Sanaga River basins to the east of the Niger Delta.

== Ecology ==
Besides breathing in the normal way through its gills, the reticulated knifefish is able to breathe air at the surface of the water. For this purpose the swim bladder acts as a lung; it is an elongated structure that extends for the length of the body cavity and has finger-like side projections. This adaptation allows the fish to live in swamps where the water would otherwise be too low in oxygen content. The swim bladder can also be used to create sounds.

The reticulated knifefish produces a small number of relatively large eggs; the average fecundity is 500 eggs/kg of bodyweight, the eggs having a diameter of 3.6 mm (0.14 in). The large eggs results in large larvae which may have a better chance of survival in inhospitable surroundings. The reticulated knifefish is among a small group of teleost fish to be electroreceptive; although sensitive to electric charges, the fish does not possess an electric organ, but uses this ability to locate objects in its vicinity, detect prey, and avoid predators.
