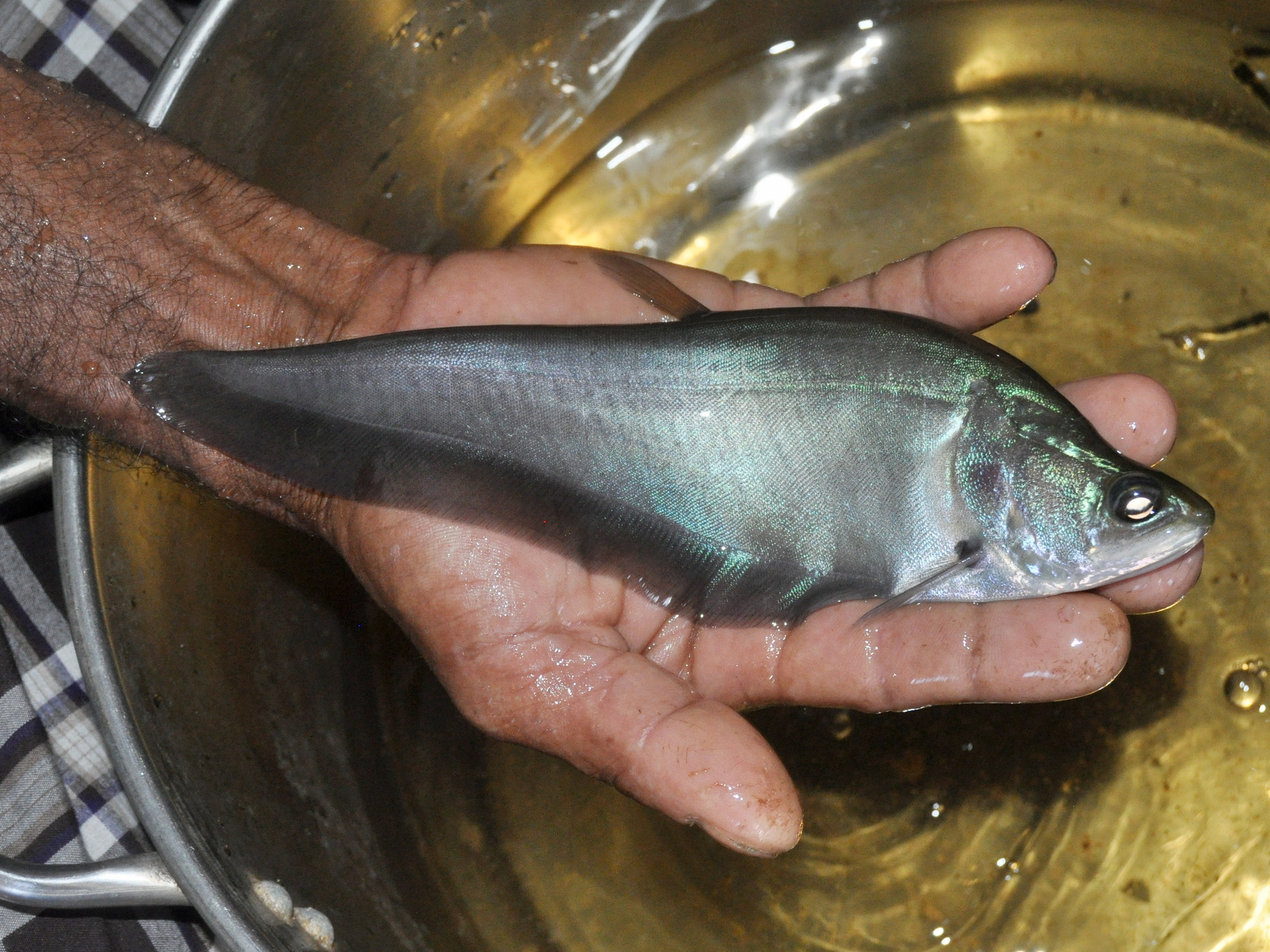
- From Nilo river near Tesso Nilo National Park

Conservation status
- Least Concern (IUCN 3.1)

Scientific classification
- Kingdom: Animalia
- Phylum: Chordata
- Class: Actinopterygii
- Order: Osteoglossiformes
- Family: Notopteridae
- Genus: Chitala
- Species: C. hypselonotus

Binomial name
- Chitala hypselonotus Bleeker, 1852

= Chitala hypselonotus =

Species of ray-finned fish

Chitala hypselonotus is a species of knifefish found in freshwater habitats in Borneo and Sumatra in southeast Asia.
