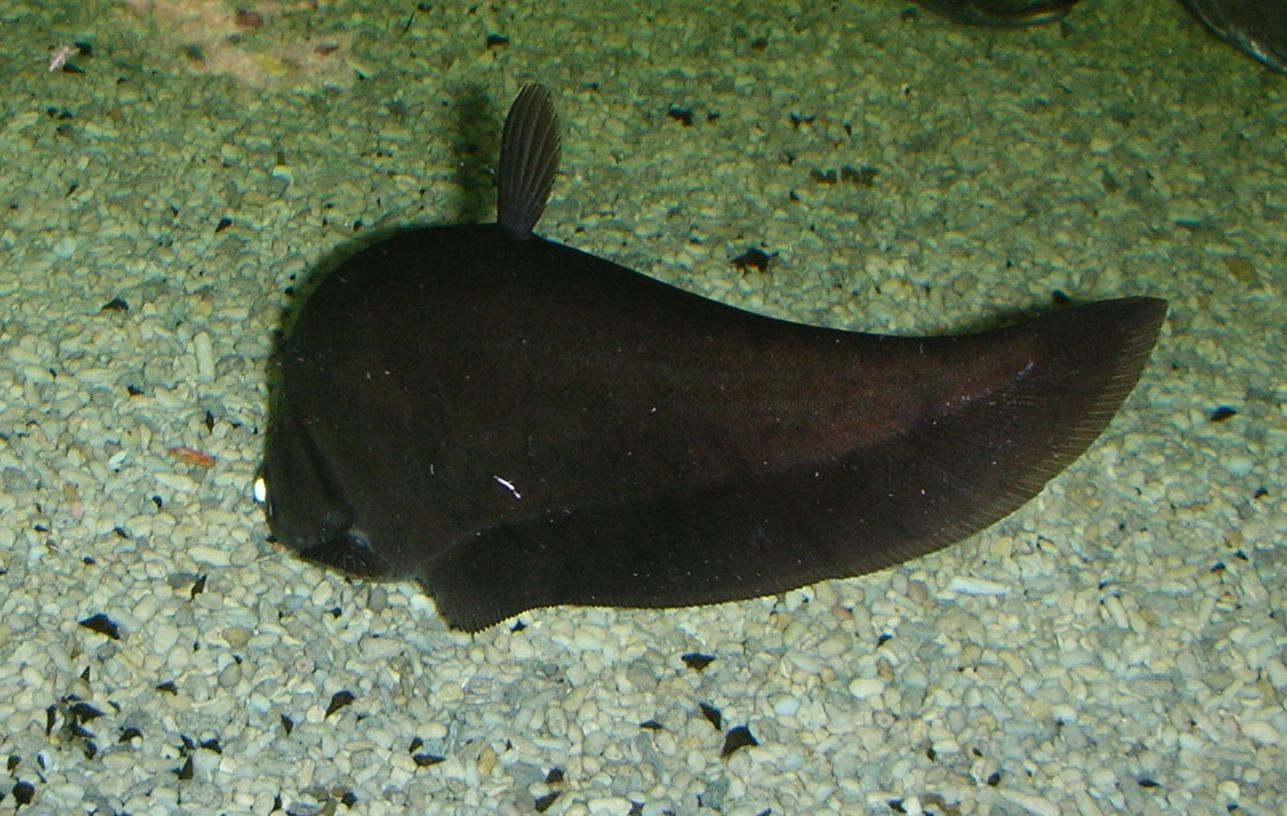
- Notopterus notopterus

Scientific classification
- Kingdom: Animalia
- Phylum: Chordata
- Class: Actinopterygii
- Division: Teleostei
- Order: Osteoglossiformes
- Family: Notopteridae
- Subfamily: Notopterinae
- Genus: Notopterus; Lacépède, 1800

Species
- N. notopterus (Pallas, 1769); N. synurus (Bloch & Schneider, 1801)

= Notopterus =

Notopterus Temporal range: Eocene–present

Genus of fish

Notopterus is a genus of fishes in family Notopteridae found in South Asia:Pakistan, India, Nepal and Bangladesh (N. synurus) and Southeast Asia: Myanmar, Indonesia, Malaysia, Laos, Thailand, Cambodia and Vietnam (N. notopterus).

The genus was formerly monotypic, featuring only the tautonymous type species. However, genetic evidence recommended that the genus be split in 2020. In addition, the fossil species †Notopterus primaevus Günther, 1876 is known from an complete skeleton described from the Eocene-aged Sangkarewang Formation of Sumatra, Indonesia.
