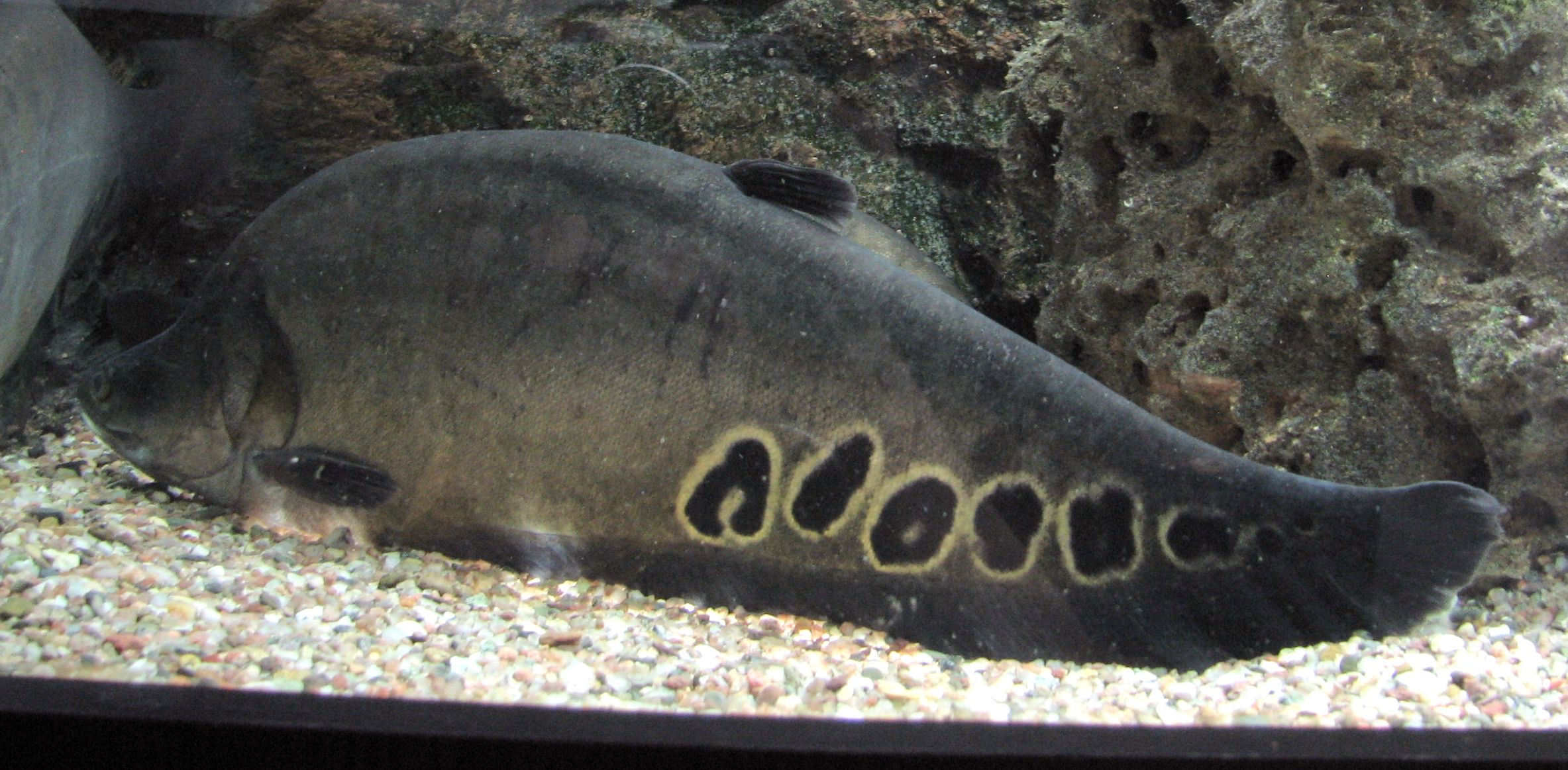
- Chitala ornata

Scientific classification
- Kingdom: Animalia
- Phylum: Chordata
- Class: Actinopterygii
- Order: Osteoglossiformes
- Family: Notopteridae
- Subfamily: Notopterinae
- Genus: Chitala; Fowler, 1934

Type species
- Mystus chitala Hamilton, 1822

Species
- See species

= Chitala =

Genus of ray-finned fishes

Chitala is a genus of fish of the family Notopteridae. This genus contains six species, some of which are important in aquaculture and the aquarium industry. They are commonly known as the Asian knifefishes or featherbacks. They are native to freshwater in South East and Southeast Asia.

The largest fish in the genus (and also the family) is Chitala lopis, which grows up to a length of 1.5 m (4.9 ft). Other well-known species are the clown knifefish (C. ornata) and the Indochina knifefish (C. blanci).

== Species ==
There are six recognized species in this genus. In the past some of these (notably C. ornata) were included in C. chitala, resulting in considerable confusion, especially in the fishing and aquarium industries.

- Chitala blanci (François d'Aubenton-Carafa, 1965) (Indochina featherback or royal knifefish)
- Chitala borneensis (Bleeker, 1851)
- Chitala chitala (F. Hamilton, 1822) (Indian featherback)
- Chitala hypselonotus (Bleeker, 1852)
- Chitala lopis (Bleeker, 1851)
- Chitala ornata (J. E. Gray, 1831) (Clown featherback or clown knifefish)
