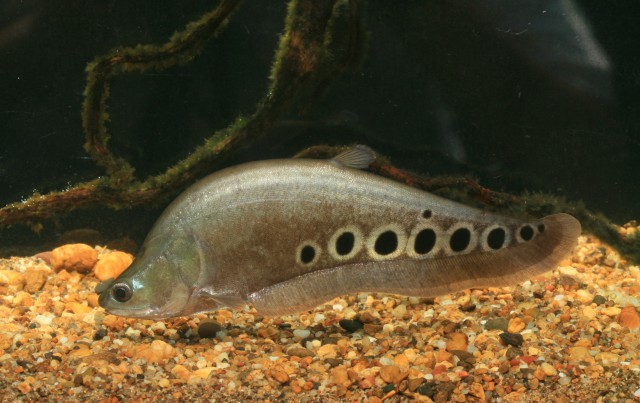
- Chitala ornata

Scientific classification
- Kingdom: Animalia
- Phylum: Chordata
- Class: Actinopterygii
- Division: Teleostei
- Order: Osteoglossiformes
- Family: Notopteridae; Bleeker, 1859

Genera
- See text

= Notopteridae =

Featherbacks Temporal range: 70.6–0 Ma Late Cretaceous to present

Family of fishes

The family Notopteridae contains 11 species of osteoglossiform (bony-tongued) fishes, commonly known as featherbacks and knifefishes. These fishes live in freshwater or brackish environments in Africa and West, South, East and Southeast Asia.

With the denotation of "knifefish", the notopterids should not be confused with Gymnotiformes, the electric knifefishes from South and Central America. Although their manner of swimming is similar and they are superficially similar in appearance, the two groups are not closely related.

A few of the larger species, especially Chitala ornata, are food fish and occasionally aquarium pets. The name is from Greek noton meaning "back" and pteron meaning "fin".

== Fossils ==
The earliest fossil of this family is otolith of Notopteridarum from the Late Cretaceous of India, about 70.6 to 66 million years ago.

== Description ==
Featherbacks have slender, elongated, bodies, giving them a knife-like appearance. The caudal fin is small and fused with the anal fin, which runs most of the length of the body. Where present, the dorsal fin is small and narrow, giving rise to the common name of "featherback". The fish swims by holding its body rigid and rippling the anal fin to propel itself forward or backwards.

Notopterids have specialized swim bladders. The organ extends throughout the body and even into the fins in some cases. Although the swim bladder is not highly vascularised, it can absorb oxygen from air and also functions to produce sound by squeezing air through a narrow passage into the pharynx.

At least some species prepare nests and guard the eggs until they hatch.

== Species ==
The 10 species in four genera are:

- Subfamily Xenomystinae Greenwood 1963 (African knifefishes, African featherbacks)
  - Genus Papyrocranus Greenwood, 1963
    - Papyrocranus afer (Günther, 1868) (reticulated knifefish)
    - Papyrocranus congoensis (Nichols & La Monte, 1932)
  - Genus Xenomystus Günther, 1868
    - Xenomystus nigri (Günther, 1868) (African brown knifefish)
- Subfamily Notopterinae Bleeker 1851 (Asian knifefishes, Asian featherbacks)
  - Genus Chitala Fowler, 1934
    - Chitala blanci (d'Aubenton, 1965) (royal knifefish or Indochina featherback)
    - Chitala borneensis (Bleeker, 1851) (Indonesian featherback)
    - Chitala chitala (F. Hamilton, 1822) (Indian featherback)
    - Chitala hypselonotus (Bleeker, 1852)
    - Chitala lopis (Bleeker, 1851) (giant featherback)
    - Chitala ornata (J. E. Gray, 1831) (clown featherback or clown knifefish)
  - Genus Notopterus Lacépède, 1800 (bronze featherbacks)
    - Notopterus notopterus (Pallas, 1769) (Southeast Asia populations)
    - Notopterus synurus (Bloch & Schneider, 1801) (South Asia populations)
