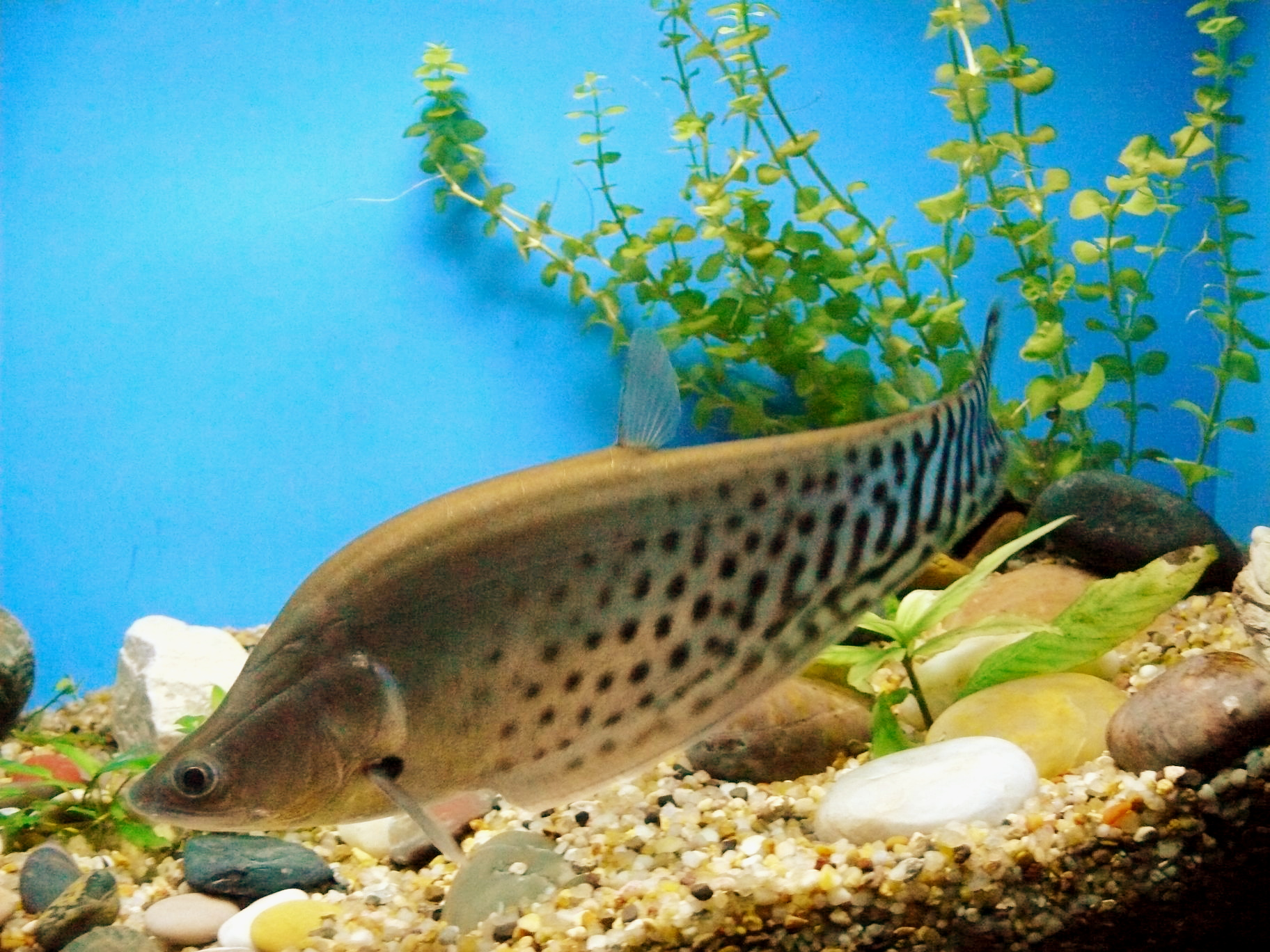

Conservation status
- Near Threatened (IUCN 3.1)

Scientific classification
- Kingdom: Animalia
- Phylum: Chordata
- Class: Actinopterygii
- Order: Osteoglossiformes
- Family: Notopteridae
- Genus: Chitala
- Species: C. blanci

Binomial name
- Chitala blanci (d'Aubenton, 1965)

= Royal knifefish =

Species of ray-finned fish

The royal knifefish or Indochina featherback (Chitala blanci) is a species of ray-finned fish in the family Notopteridae found in the Mekong basin in Cambodia, Laos, Thailand and Vietnam.

== In the aquarium ==
The royal knifefish, often sold as the royal clown knifefish, is occasionally sold in the aquarium trade.
