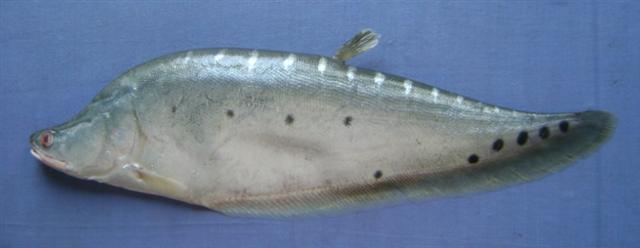
- Specimen from Karachi, Pakistan

Conservation status
- Near Threatened (IUCN 3.1)

Scientific classification
- Kingdom: Animalia
- Phylum: Chordata
- Class: Actinopterygii
- Order: Osteoglossiformes
- Family: Notopteridae
- Genus: Chitala
- Species: C. chitala

Binomial name
- Chitala chitala F. Hamilton, 1822

= Chitala chitala =

Species of ray-finned fish

Chitala chitala (Assamese: চিতল sitawl, Bengali: চিতল, chitol) is a knifefish from Bangladesh, India, Nepal, and Pakistan, found in the Brahmaputra, Indus, Ganges and Mahanadi River basins. It is sometimes known as the Indian featherback or Indian knifefish. In the past, it frequently included several related Chitala species, but these are now regarded as separate species. The main species confused with this species is C. ornata (clown featherback or clown knifefish); a Southeast Asian species seen regularly in the aquarium trade. The true C. chitala is very rare in the aquarium trade.

== Description ==
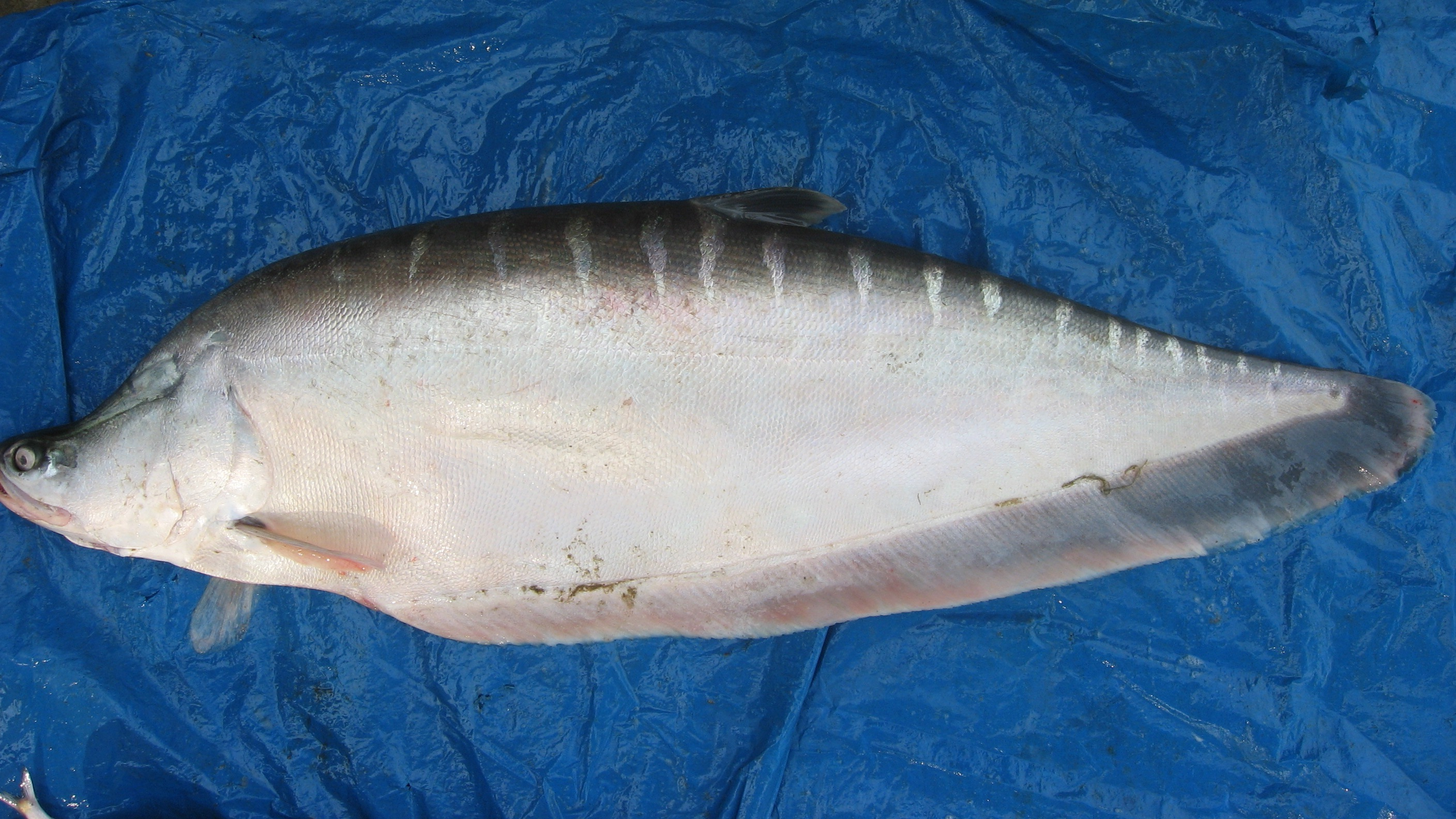
C. chitala in Assam, India: Notice the stripes on the back and the dark spots on the lower rear part of the body (both relatively indistinct)

C. chitala reaches a maximum length of 122 cm (48 in), but more commonly reaches about 75 cm (30 in). It is overall silvery in color. Unlike all its relatives, it usually has a series of golden or silvery bars along the back, resulting in a faint striped appearance. Additionally, it has a series of fairly small, sometimes indistinct, non-ocellated dark spots towards the far rear of the body (at the "tail"). This separates it from C. ornata, which has ocellated spots (dark spots surrounded by a paler ring) and lacks bars along the back. The two species have frequently been confused.

== As food ==
Chital maasor jul, chital machher jhol, Chital Maccher Muitthya and Chital Maccher Peti are a regional delicacy in Bangladesh and neighbouring Assam and West Bengal in India.

== In religion ==
This species has a place in Hinduism as one of the avatars of Lord Vishnu; in the first incarnation of "Matsya", Vishnu was born as a golden knifefish to kill the demon.
