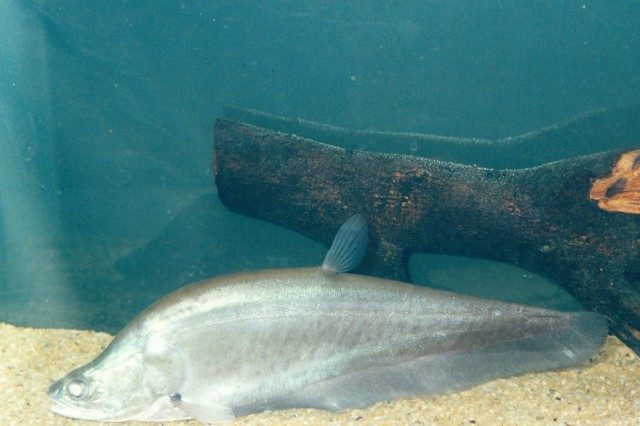

Scientific classification
- Kingdom: Animalia
- Phylum: Chordata
- Class: Actinopterygii
- Division: Teleostei
- Order: Osteoglossiformes
- Family: Notopteridae
- Genus: Chitala
- Species: C. lopis

Binomial name
- Chitala lopis Bleeker, 1851

= Chitala lopis =

Species of ray-finned fish

Chitala lopis, also known as the belida or giant featherback, is a species of freshwater fish, endemic to the islands of Java and Sumatra in Indonesia. It inhabits lowland river mainstreams and tributaries with rocky and sunken wood bottoms, as well as forest-covered streams. It feeds on smaller fishes, insects and vertebrates, mostly at night. The species was declared to be extinct on 2020 and hasn't been updated since, but rediscovered at the type locality in 2023.
