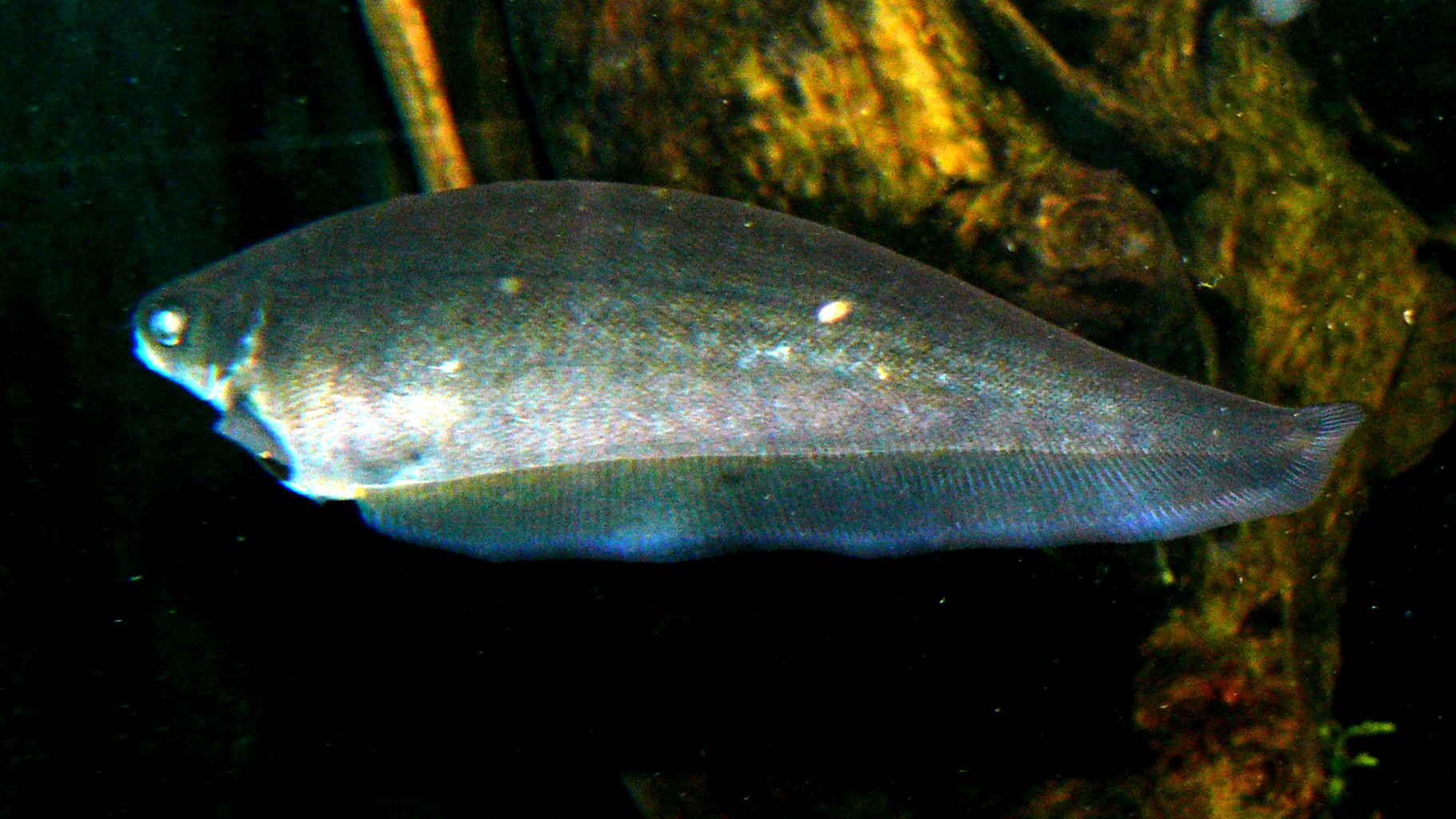

Conservation status
- Least Concern (IUCN 3.1)

Scientific classification
- Kingdom: Animalia
- Phylum: Chordata
- Class: Actinopterygii
- Division: Teleostei
- Order: Osteoglossiformes
- Family: Notopteridae
- Subfamily: Xenomystinae
- Genus: Xenomystus; Günther, 1868
- Species: X. nigri

Binomial name
- Xenomystus nigri (Günther, 1868)
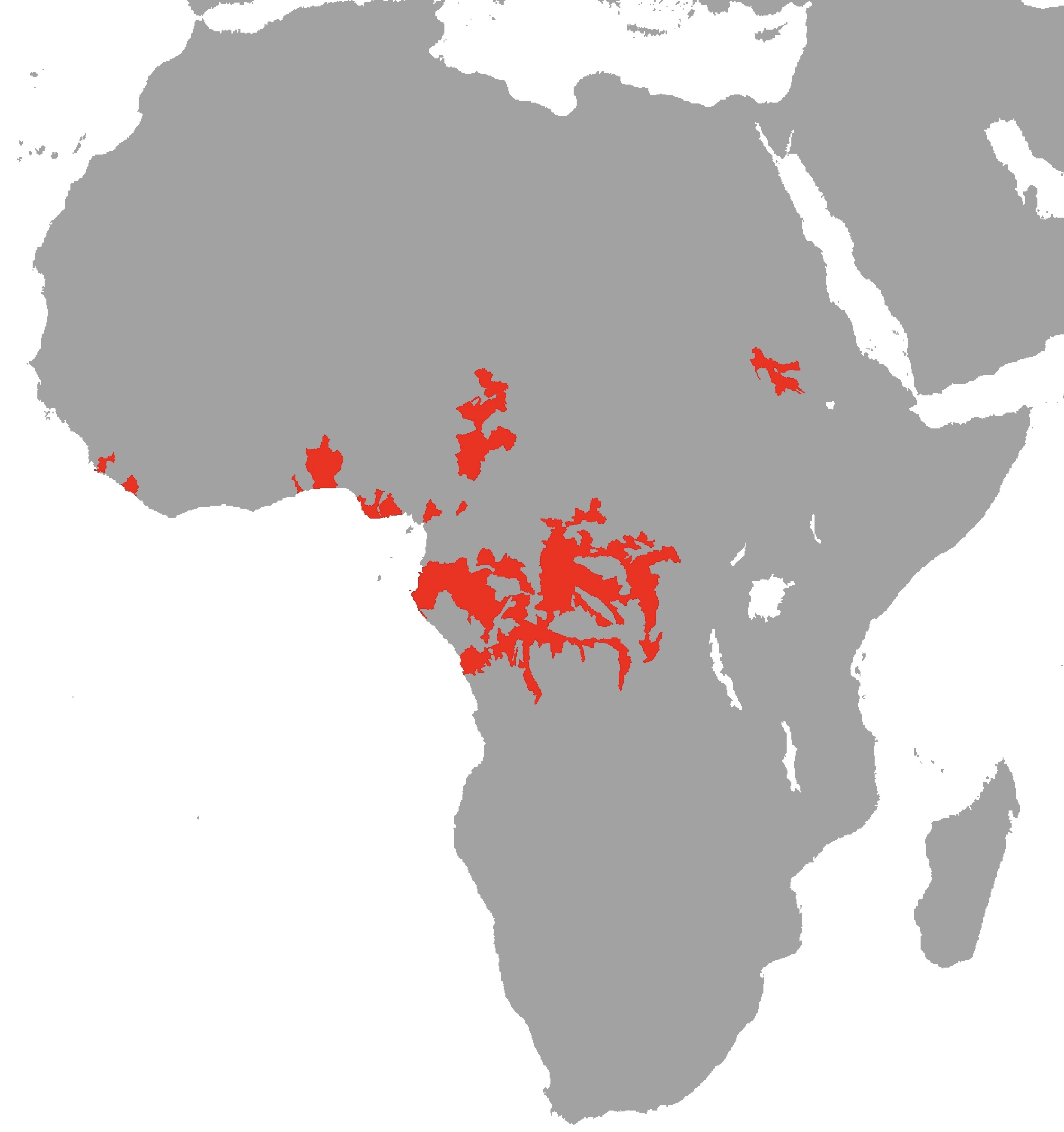

= African brown knifefish =

Species of ray-finned fish

The African brown knifefish (Xenomystus nigri), known for its knife like shape, is the only species in the genus Xenomystus of the family Notopteridae. This fish is found in fresh water streams and lakes of the Chad, Nile, Congo, Ogowe and Niger basins, as well as coastal river basins in Sierra Leone, Liberia, Togo, Benin and Cameroon. This fish is nocturnal and prefers habitats with caves or dense vegetation to hide.

== Anatomy and appearance ==
This fish reaches 30 cm (12 in) in standard length. The body of these fish is unusual; it is ventrolaterally flattened and elongated, giving the appearance of a knife blade. The caudal and anal fins are fused and run from beneath the gill opening to the pointed end of the body, creating a uniform, skirt-like fin. This appendage gives the animal superior control in the water, as it is able to propel itself forward and backward efficiently without wasting energy. The pelvic fins are extremely reduced and are not used in locomotion. The dorsal fin is absent. The pectoral fins of the African brown knifefish are lengthy and designed to give the animal precise control as it swims. They are often employed in a windmilling motion, in conjunction with the caudal/anal fin, as the fish retreats into its lair.

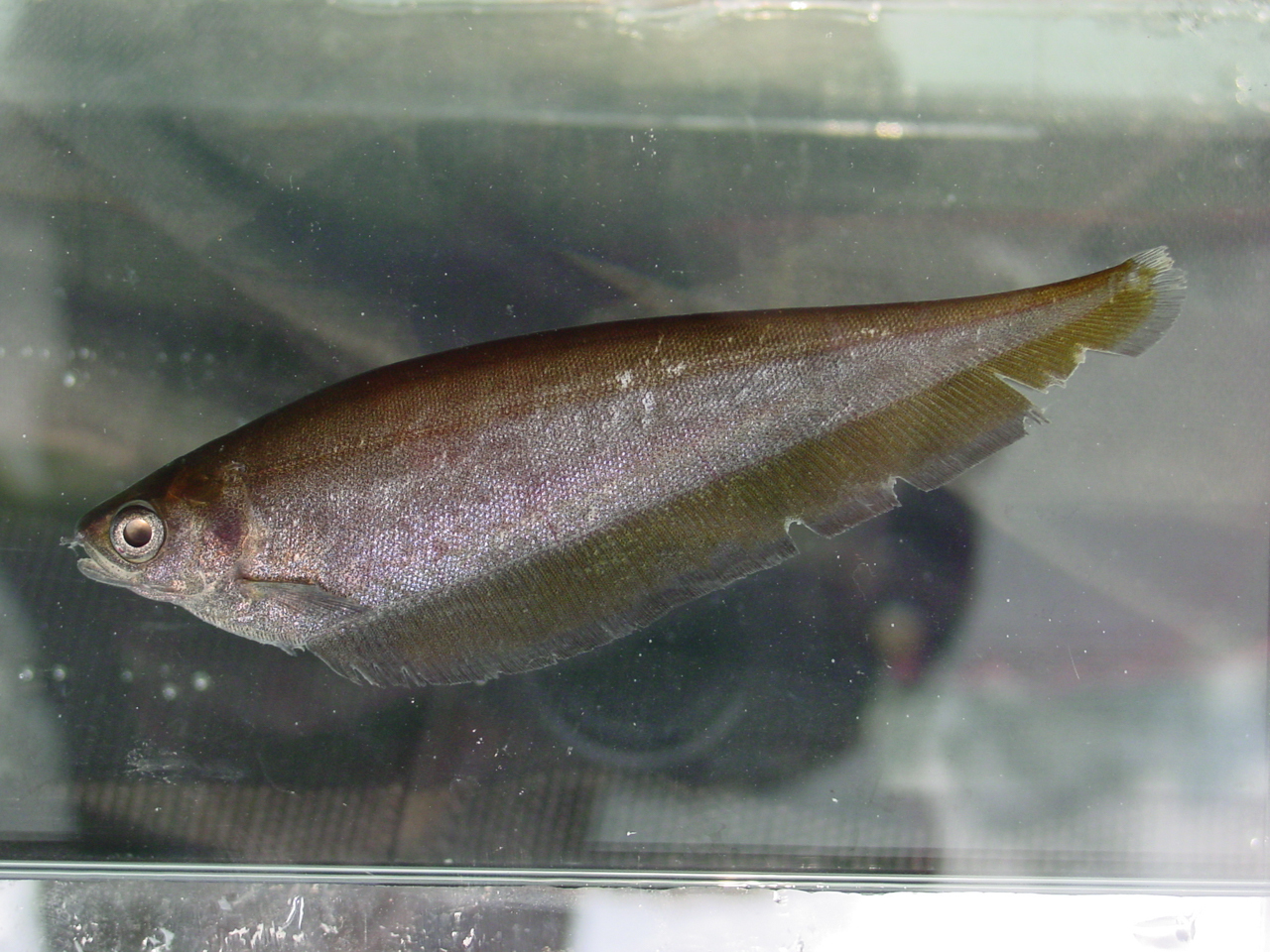
In the Republic of Congo

The scales of the knifefish are extremely small, giving it a smooth appearance broken only by its fairly prominent lateral line. Apart from its eyes, the lateral line is the knifefish's most important sensory apparatus. The African brown knifefish is nocturnal and uses the nerve-filled pits running down its body to navigate lightless waters. In addition, the eyes of this fish are large in relation to its body size. They provide the animal with excellent night vision.

The mouth is large, and the fish also possesses a pair of short barbels used in hunting. The knifefish, when not hiding away, spends much of its time swimming with its head down and the barbels in close proximity to the substrate. Combined with its acute eyes, the barbels aid the fish in locating its food.

The sexual dimorphism among this species is minimal. Females and males are hard to tell apart. It is easiest to sex these fish when the female is ready to lay eggs because the female will look more plump than the male African brown knifefish.

== Ecology ==
This fish inhabits quiet water with vegetation. Females lay 150–200 eggs of 2 mm (0.08 in) in diameter. This species can produce barking sounds. They come to the surface from time to time to swallow air. They feed on worms, crustaceans, insects, and snails.

== In Captivity ==
This species is sometimes available as an aquarium fish, and has been popular in the hobby for a long time. Because this fish is primarily nocturnal, it will retreat from brightness in the aquarium. When larger, these fish may prey upon smaller tankmates as these fish have relatively large mouths for their size. This fish does well when kept in small groups when young, although as it ages, it becomes somewhat aggressive towards those of its own kind.

== See also ==
- List of freshwater aquarium fish species
