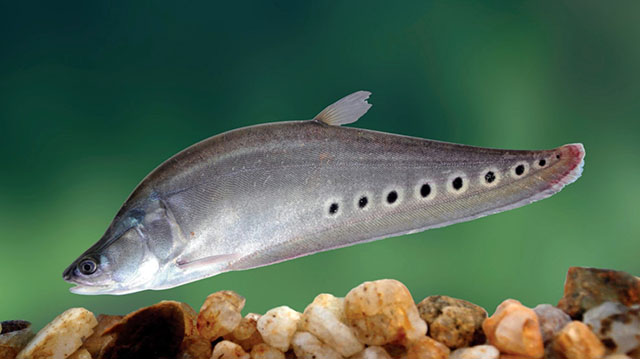

Conservation status
- Least Concern (IUCN 3.1)

Scientific classification
- Kingdom: Animalia
- Phylum: Chordata
- Class: Actinopterygii
- Division: Teleostei
- Order: Osteoglossiformes
- Family: Notopteridae
- Genus: Chitala
- Species: C. ornata

Binomial name
- Chitala ornata J. E. Gray, 1831
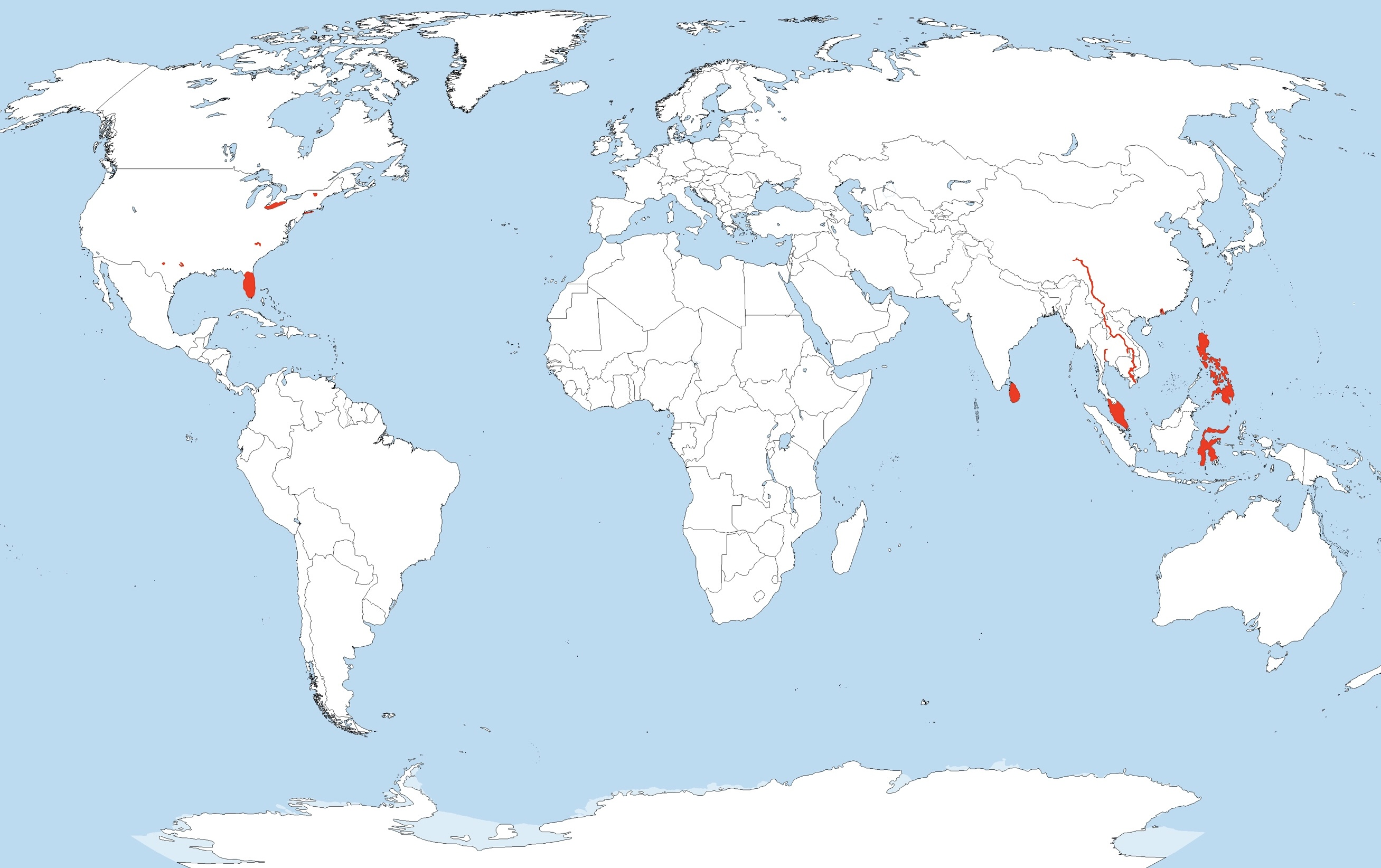

= Clown featherback =

Species of ray-finned fish

The clown featherback (Chitala ornata), also known as the clown knifefish and spotted knifefish, is a nocturnal species of tropical fish with a long, knife-like body. This knifefish is native to freshwater habitats in Cambodia, China, Hong Kong, Laos, Macau, Thailand, and Vietnam, but it has also been introduced to regions outside its native range. It is one of the world's most invasive species. It is often seen in aquaculture and the aquarium trade, where it is frequently confused with Chitala chitala; the latter species is very rare in the aquarium trade. The clown featherback reaches 1 m (3.3 ft) in length, outgrowing all but the largest aquaria, yet it is popular.

== Taxonomy ==
The clown knifefish belongs to the family Notopteridae, which can be found in Africa and Asia (including India). Notopterids can be characterized by their laterally compressed bodies accompanied by an elongated anal fin. The origin of notopterids can be traced back to the Early Cretaceous when the African and Asian clades split, redistributing the genus between both regions. Within the four genera of notopterids, Chitala species are native to tropical regions of Asia, identified by their concave profiles.

== Description ==
Chitala species have distinct physical features that set them apart from other fishes. A grey-silver, laterally compressed body and long anal fin that extends to the caudal fin in the composition presents a knife appearance. A row of 6-10 oscillated black spots with white borders above the anal fin base, and lack of faint lines on their back differentiates C. ornata from the rest of the genus. The characteristics of the spots (quantity, shape, and size) are dependent on environmental, genetic, and nutritional factors. In contrast, juveniles have a brownish-yellow color that grays out with age, assuming adult coloration when 25 to 35 cm long. The black spots are absent in juveniles, instead they have blackish-brown vertical lines that also gray out with age. Their small dorsal fin is humped anteriorly, producing a featherlike look. Although small, the dorsal fin allows for stability while the anal fin controls movement. Most fish rely on their caudal fins to propel forward, but clown knifefish rely on their long anal fin for propulsion. The anal fin is continuous with the caudal fin, extending along 2/3 of the posterior of the body. Rippling the anal fin from their head towards the caudal fin drives their forward motion, while rippling from the caudal fin to the head drives their backward motion. The small pectoral fins are used for steering and braking. While they lack a ventral fin, the long anal fin aids in balance. The wavelike motion enables the use of their lateral line to detect vibrations in the water, assisted by reduced turbulence that would otherwise interfere with detection.

== Distribution ==
Clown knifefish are ectotherms native to tropical fresh waters in Southeast Asia, specifically the Mekong, Chao Phraya, and Mae Klong Basins surrounding Laos, Thailand, Cambodia, and Vietnam. They are widely distributed in shallow, well oxygenated streams and rivers. Typically, they are found in lotic rather than lentic systems due to preference for flowing water and vegetation cover, but they can also be found in stagnant and sluggish water, supported by their modified swim bladder. This allows them to live for an indefinite period in confined water. They are nocturnal, remaining inactive in covered areas during the day and out hunting at night.

While native to the tropics of Asia, they are also found in Florida and Sri Lanka. They are widely known to be an invasive species outside their native region. Past high demands in aquaculture and aquarium trading have introduced the clown knifefish to new waters. They are usually exported as juveniles and raised by ornamental fish breeders that have accidentally and deliberately released the invasive species. Their ability to tolerate high salinity and polluted waters have led to the predation of several endemic and endangered native species.

== Behavior and life history ==
These fish are primarily carnivorous, allowing them to widen their food spectrum in response to environmental changes In their native habitat, they have very few natural predators; they are at the top of the food chain in newly inhabited waters, often preying on smaller fish, crustaceans, and insects. Juveniles tend to hunt near vegetation and congregate for protection, becoming independent as they mature. Adults are known to be territorial and prefer to travel alone. Clown knifefish migrate locally, but are not migratory spawners like salmon.

Spawning is observed from March to August, peaking from April to May, when 300 to 500 eggs are laid at a time. Spawning occurs in vegetation and submerged wood because it is stable and safer. The effort and productivity of females' spawning, their gonadosomatic index, begins in March and peaks in May until it gradually begins to decrease until August. They produce larger eggs than species that do not care for their eggs, and the extent of care depends on the egg sizes. All Chitala species demonstrate the same parental care method. The nests are actively cared for by both parents, but the males guard the nest. When guarding, males become defensive and hostile towards potential predators. They exhibit a rolling motion that exposes their broad, silvery side. Fertilized eggs are hatched by fanning, which helps supply dissolved oxygen. The eggs are spherical in shape, transparent with a milky yellow tone, and adhesive surface with projections. Adults can reach up to 3.3 ft long in the wild, but their developmental timing is different between natural and laboratory-reared conditions.

The adult mortality ratio is male biased because clown knifefish have few natural predators in their native habitat. They are at the top of their food chain, so sex-specific mortality in the guarding parent is lower than expected. Males are concentrated in nesting sites during incubation and early development stages where nests are constructed and eggs are constantly fanned. Males have smaller bodies because their body condition declines from the energy exerted in guarding the eggs and juveniles. Females have larger bodies for greater reproductive success. Size is assumed to be directly correlated with fecundity, so larger females have a higher chance of being courted.

== Conservation status and economic value ==
The International Union for Conservation of Nature has listed the clown knifefish as "least concern", due to their wide native range and ability to withstand diverse, unfavorable conditions. Although the species has a large presence in Southeast Asian aquaculture, it is widely known as an invasive species to regions primarily in Asia and the United States. They are commonly consumed in Southeast Asia, primarily Thailand. Since they contain several small bones, they are typically minced for fish balls or deep fried.

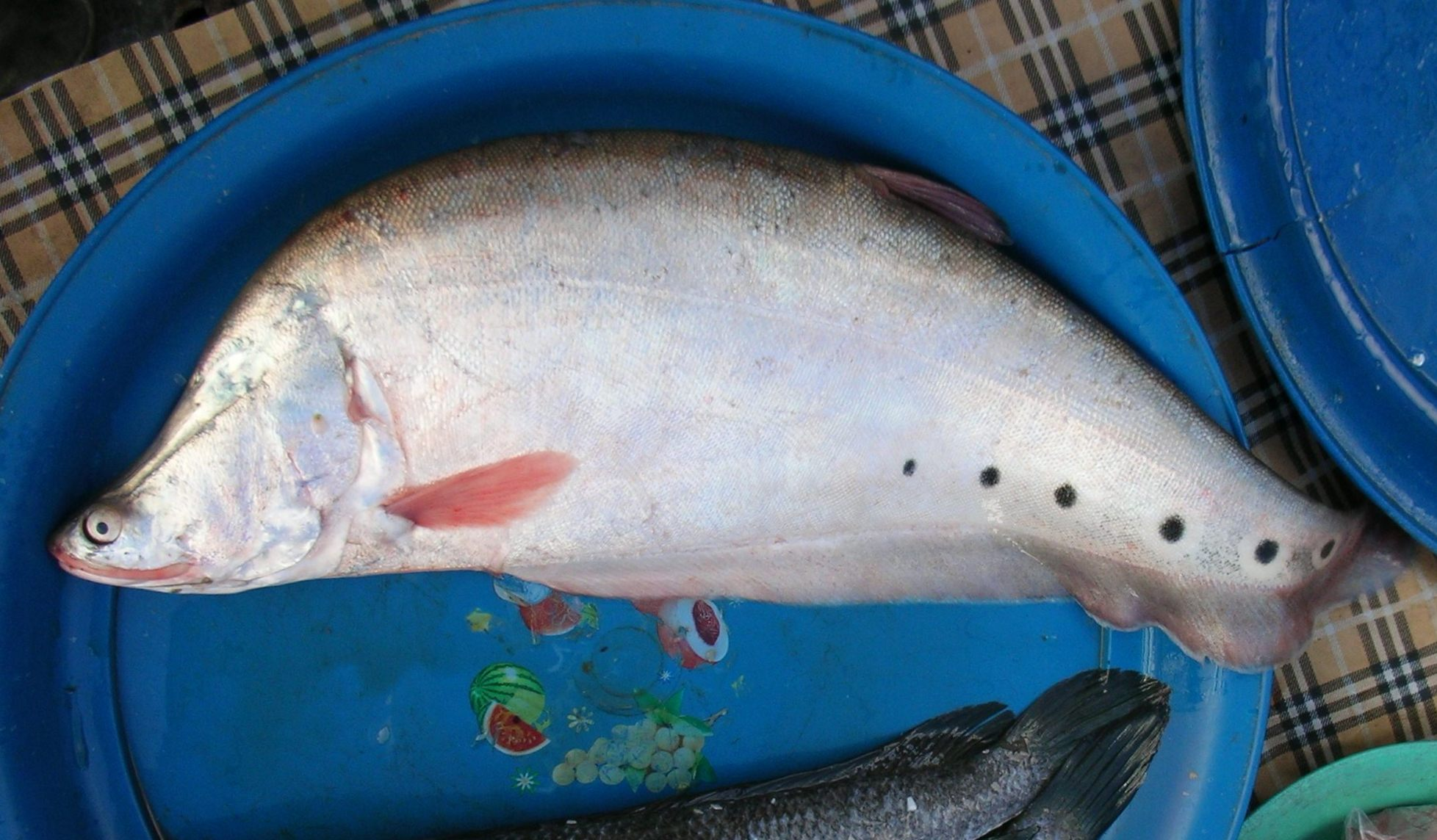
Adult in the market in Chiang Rai, Thailand

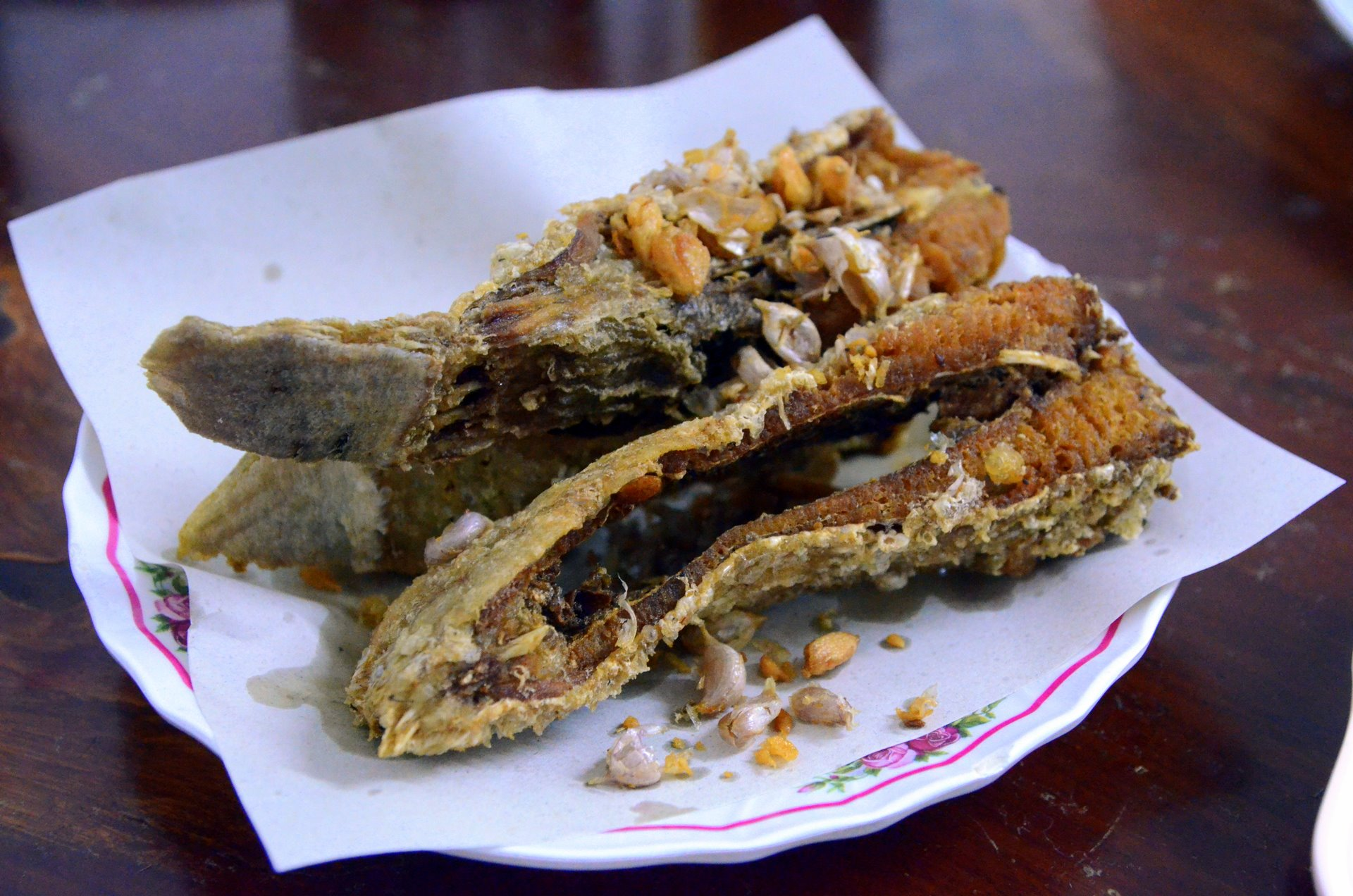
Deep-fried pla krai with garlic
