= Betta mulyadii =

Scientific classification
- Kingdom: Animalia
- Phylum: Chordata
- Class: Actinopterygii
- Division: Teleostei
- Order: Anabantiformes
- Family: Osphronemidae
- Genus: Betta
- Species: B. mulyadii

Binomial name
- Betta mulyadii Ding, Lei, Haryono, Shi & Zhang, 2025
- It is endemic to the province Riau on Sumatra, Indonesia

Species of fish

Betta mulyadii is a species of tropical freshwater fish in the family Osphronemidae endemic to Sumatra, Indonesia. It is threatened with extinction, and is kept as an aquarium fish.

== Description ==
Betta mulyadii is a diminutive, 22.4–28.4 mm long (SL), facultatively air-breathing, tropical freshwater fish with a slim body and conspicuous red colouration. The small, rounded head is grey to rose coloured. The males exhibit a more intense colouration. The narrow dorsal fin has 8–10 rays.

== Taxonomy ==
It was described by Jiali Ding, Wen Lei, Haryono Haryono, Wentian Shi, and Wanchang Zhang in 2025. It is part of the Betta coccina species complex. The type specimen was collected by Mulyadi Tjoa Hong Tjai in an oil palm plantation in Riau, Sumatra, Indonesia in November 2023 and the exact location of the type locality is kept secret, due to conservation concerns. After its initial discovery by the Indonesian fish expert Mulyadi Tjoa Hong Tjai in 2012, it was sold as Betta sp. 'api-api' in the ornamental fish trade. Betta mulyadii is the sister group to Betta iaspis.

=== Etymology ===
The specific epithet mulyadii honours Mulyadi Tjoa Hong Tjai, who discovered the species.

== Distribution and habitat ==
It is endemic to Indonesia, where it occurs in a single area of less than 5 km^{2} in the soft, acidic, strongly humic blackwater of the peat swamp habitats on Sumatra. The water with a very low electrical conductivity and extremely low levels of dissolved minerals has a pH value of around 4.

== Behaviour ==
It is mostly peaceful, but the male fish may be aggressive.

== Diet ==
In their natural environment, Betta mulyadii feeds on small insects and other small invertebrates.

== Breeding ==
The male fish construct bubble nests under floating vegetation and guards the eggs and fry. The eggs hatch within 1–2 days. The fry can survive for a few days on the nutrients provided by the yolk sac.

== Conservation ==
Betta mulyadii is endangered due to agricultural use and the alteration of its habitat. It is only known from the type locality, a small, fragmented peat swamp in an oil palm plantation, next to an active oil extraction facility. The precise location of the only known population is being kept secret. The habitat is in poor condition, as the original forest no longer exists, and the remaining swamp is shaded by secondary vegetation. The IUCN red list status has not been evaluated, but immediate in-situ and ex-situ conservation is needed for this species and it is likely to be categorised as critically endangered.

== Use ==
It is kept as an aquarium fish, since it was introduced to the pet fish trade in 2013. It should be kept in an aquarium with at volume of least 30 l in warm, soft, and acid water with temperatures of 24–29°C. Betta mulyadii requires a very densely planted aquarium with a few floating plants. In an aquarium setting, the fish feed on live and frozen foods, such as Artemia and Daphnia.
