= Betta andrei =

Scientific classification
- Kingdom: Animalia
- Phylum: Chordata
- Class: Actinopterygii
- Order: Anabantiformes
- Family: Osphronemidae
- Genus: Betta
- Species: B. andrei

Binomial name
- Betta andrei Tan, 2023

Species of fish

Betta andrei is a species of gourami in the family Osphronemidae. It is a black water fighting fish that is endemic to Singkep Island, Indonesia. It was described in 2023 by Heok Hui Tan, who named it after Andre Chandra, a fish collector and enthusiast who helped him during his fieldwork.

== Description ==
Betta andrei belongs to the Betta waseri group, which consists of nine other species of betta fish that live in acidic water habitats. B. andrei has a distinctive throat pattern, which is black and pitcher-shaped, unlike any other known member of its group. It also has a yellowish-brown body with iridescent scales and faint black bars on its fins. The males have longer fins than the females, especially the caudal fin, which is rounded in shape. The males also have more intense coloration than the females.

== Distribution and habitat ==
Betta andrei is only known from a small stream on Singkep Island, Indonesia. The stream is surrounded by peat swamp forest and has dark brown water with a pH of 4.5. The water temperature ranges from 24 to 26 °C (75 to 79 °F). The substrate consists of sand, leaf litter, and fallen branches. Betta andrei shares its habitat with other fish species such as Rasbora einthovenii, Rasbora trilineata, Pangio shelfordii, and Channa gachua.

== Conservation ==
Betta andrei is not evaluated by the IUCN Red List of Threatened Species, but it may be threatened by habitat loss and degradation due to deforestation, agriculture, mining, and human settlement. It may also be affected by overcollection for the aquarium trade, as it is a rare and beautiful fish that may attract collectors. Betta andrei is not protected by any law or regulation in Indonesia.
