= Betta miniopinna =

Conservation status
- Critically Endangered (IUCN 3.1)

Scientific classification
- Kingdom: Animalia
- Phylum: Chordata
- Class: Actinopterygii
- Order: Anabantiformes
- Family: Osphronemidae
- Genus: Betta
- Species: B. miniopinna

Binomial name
- Betta miniopinna H. H. Tan & S. H. Tan, 1994

Species of fish

Betta miniopinna is a species of gourami endemic to Bintan Island in the Riau Archipelago of Indonesia. The species reaches 2.4 cm (0.9 inches) in standard length and is believed to be a facultative air-breather.

== Etymology ==
The binomial Betta miniopinna is derived from the vernacular Malay term ikan betah, which refers to the broad categorization of species in this genus Betta; and miniopinna, from the Latin minius (cinnabar-red) and pinna (fin), in reference to the reddish colouration of the species' pelvic fins.

== Distribution and ecology ==
Betta miniopinna is stenotopic to densely forested peat swamps and associated streams near Tanjong Bintan on Pulau Bintan (in which it is sympatric to B. spilotogena), characterized by an acidic blackwater habitat (of a pH of 4.9–6) formed as a consequence of the abundant decay of humic material and the effusion of tannins from decaying leaves. The substrate of these swamps consists of a soft mud, covered with submerged leaf litter and branches, and a dense system of submerged roots. It is apparent that these systems of peat swamps are desiccated over periods of several weeks in the absence of rain, forcing the fish to survive within the moist leaf litter. It has been documented- both in situ and ex situ – that this species utilizes a paternal bubble-nesting habit, a typical mating behavior among its congeners.

== Threats ==
The species' narrow extent of occurrence has been restricted to a region of degraded peat swamps, turbid from a number of construction efforts which had been implemented in order to establish touristic industries on the island. Threats to peat-forest endemics from the conversion of swamps to monoculture plantations, and the abundance of construction in such regions are considered to pose immense conservation concerns.
