= Betta breviobesa =

Conservation status
- Vulnerable (IUCN 3.1)

Scientific classification
- Kingdom: Animalia
- Phylum: Chordata
- Class: Actinopterygii
- Order: Anabantiformes
- Family: Osphronemidae
- Genus: Betta
- Species: B. breviobesa

Binomial name
- Betta breviobesa Tan & Kottelat, 1998

Synonyms
- Betta breviobesus

Species of fish

Betta breviobesa is a species of gourami. It is native to Asia, where it occurs in the upper Kapuas River basin in West Kalimantan on the island of Borneo in Indonesia. The species reaches 6.5 centimetres (2.6 in) in standard length and is known to be a facultative air-breather. It was described in 1998 by Heok Hui Tan and Maurice Kottelat alongside the species Betta pinguis, which also occurs in the Kapuas basin.
