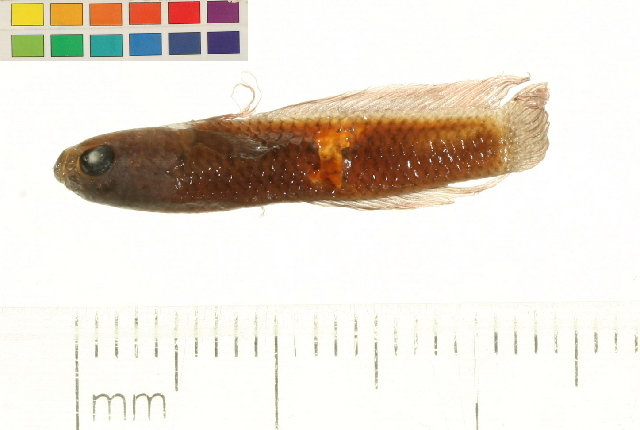

Conservation status
- Vulnerable (IUCN 3.1)

Scientific classification
- Domain: Eukaryota
- Kingdom: Animalia
- Phylum: Chordata
- Class: Actinopterygii
- Order: Anabantiformes
- Family: Osphronemidae
- Genus: Betta
- Species: B. uberis

Binomial name
- Betta uberis Tan & Ng, 2006

= Betta uberis =

Species of fish

Betta uberis is a species of gourami. It is native to Asia, where it occurs in peat swamp forests in West Kalimantan and Central Kalimantan on the island of Borneo in Indonesia. The species reaches 3.6 cm (1.4 inches) in standard length and is known to be a facultative air-breather. Its specific name, uberis, is derived from Latin and means "abundant", referring to the high number of rays present in the species' dorsal fin, which has between 14 and 17 rays, as opposed to the 10 to 12 rays present in related species such as Betta hendra.
