= Betta pardalotos =

Conservation status
- Critically Endangered (IUCN 3.1)

Scientific classification
- Kingdom: Animalia
- Phylum: Chordata
- Class: Actinopterygii
- Order: Anabantiformes
- Family: Osphronemidae
- Genus: Betta
- Species: B. pardalotos

Binomial name
- Betta pardalotos Tan, 2009

Species of fish

Betta pardalotos is a species of fish in the family Osphronemidae. It is native to Asia, where it occurs in the Musi River basin on the island of Sumatra in Indonesia. The species reaches 7.2 cm (2.8 in) in standard length and is known to be a facultative air-breather. It feeds on insects and other small invertebrates such as zooplankton.

== Reproduction ==
Betta pardalotos is known to be a paternal mouthbrooder.
