= Betta channoides =

Conservation status
- Endangered (IUCN 3.1)

Scientific classification
- Kingdom: Animalia
- Phylum: Chordata
- Class: Actinopterygii
- Division: Teleostei
- Order: Anabantiformes
- Family: Osphronemidae
- Genus: Betta
- Species: B. channoides

Binomial name
- Betta channoides Kottelat & P. K. L. Ng, 1994

Species of fish

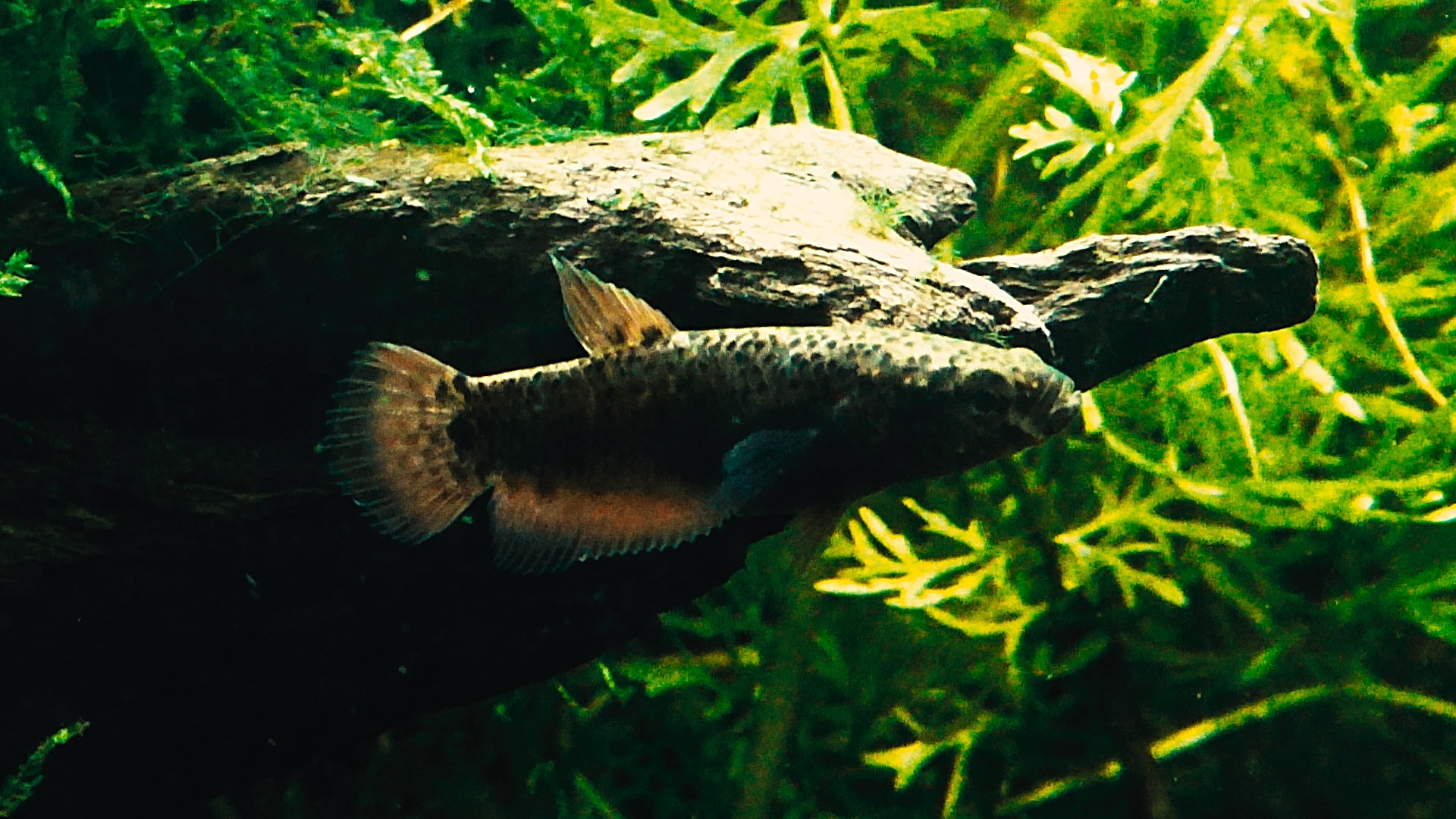
Female Betta channoides in a tank

Betta channoides is a species of betta endemic to the island of Borneo in Indonesia, where it is only found in the province of Kalimantan Timur. It is an inhabitant of the shallows of acidic brown-water forest streams. This species grows to a length of 5.0 cm (2.0 in).
