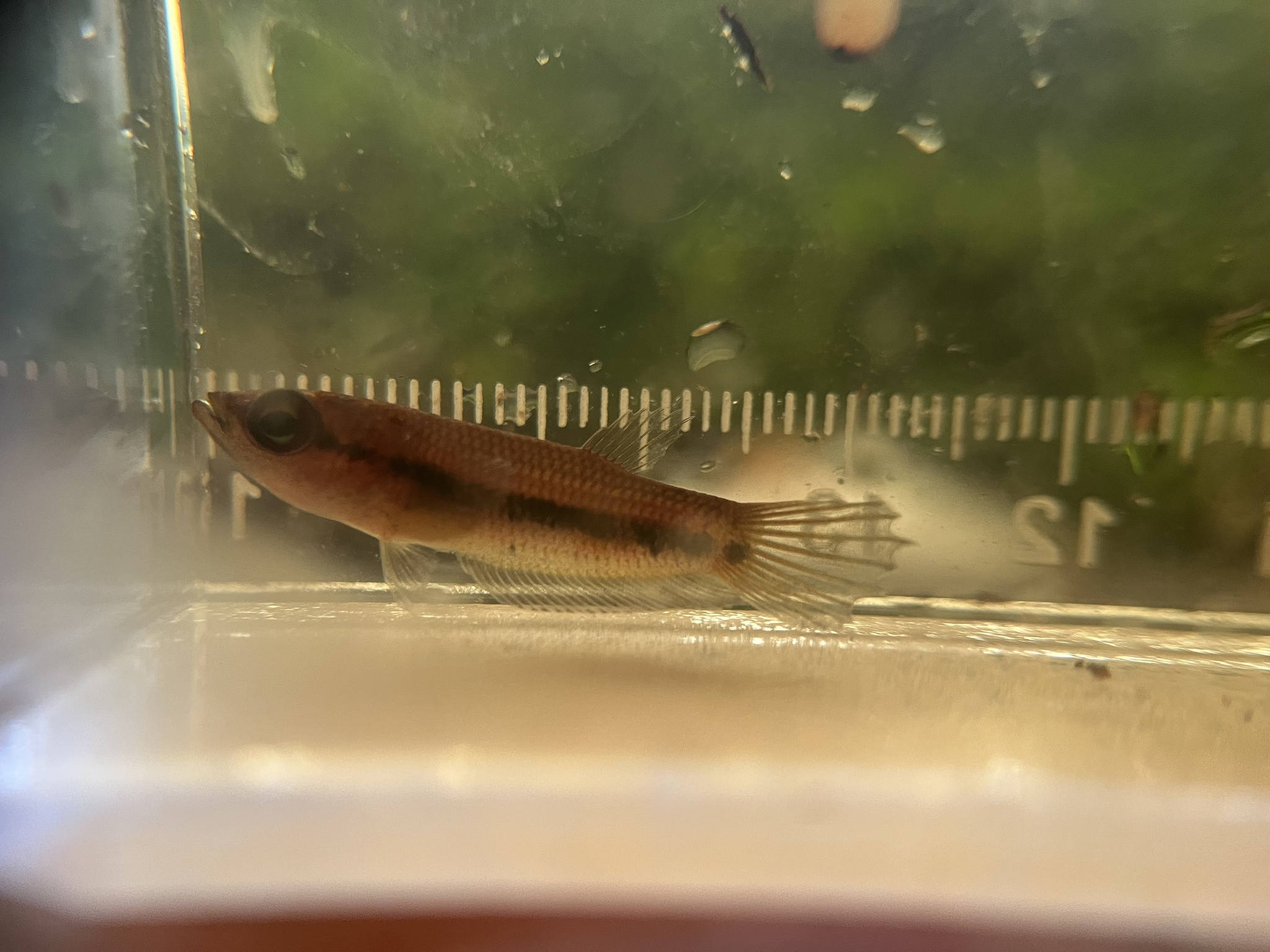

Conservation status
- Endangered (IUCN 3.1)

Scientific classification
- Kingdom: Animalia
- Phylum: Chordata
- Class: Actinopterygii
- Order: Anabantiformes
- Family: Osphronemidae
- Genus: Betta
- Species: B. tomi

Binomial name
- Betta tomi P. K. L. Ng & Kottelat, 1994

= Betta tomi =

Species of fish

Betta tomi is a species of gourami native to the Malaysian Peninsula where it is currently only found in Johor. It previously also occurred in Singapore but has since been extirpated there. It is an inhabitant of shallow streams that are shaded and have plenty of leaf litter and other debris. This species grows to a length of 7 centimetres (2.8 in) SL.
