= Betta taeniata =

Conservation status
- Data Deficient (IUCN 3.1)

Scientific classification
- Kingdom: Animalia
- Phylum: Chordata
- Class: Actinopterygii
- Order: Anabantiformes
- Family: Osphronemidae
- Genus: Betta
- Species: B. taeniata

Binomial name
- Betta taeniata Regan, 1910

Species of fish

Betta taeniata is a species of gourami endemic to the Southeast Asian island of Borneo, where it lives in inland waters.

== Description ==
Betta taeniata is known to display paternal mouthbrooding. Males of the species have more vibrant coloration and broader heads than females. Males also have a darker stripe near the anal fin. The species reaches 5.5 cm (2.2 inches) in standard length.

== Distribution and habitat ==
Betta taeniata is native to Sarawak and Kalimantan Barat. It has also been reported from Thailand and Vietnam, although its occurrence in those countries is questionable and is likely the result of stray individuals.

It lives in wetlands and appears to be restricted to hill streams in forests.

== Status ==
According to IUCN Red List, the species is threatened by agriculture and logging.

== Common names ==
The following is a list of common names for B. taeniata.

In English, it goes by:

- Borneo fighting fish

In the US, it goes by:

- Banded fighting fish
- Striped betta
- Borneo betta

In Indonesia, it goes by:

- Emplasek
- Empala
