= Betta unimaculata =

Conservation status
- Data Deficient (IUCN 3.1)

Scientific classification
- Kingdom: Animalia
- Phylum: Chordata
- Class: Actinopterygii
- Order: Anabantiformes
- Family: Osphronemidae
- Genus: Betta
- Species: B. unimaculata

Binomial name
- Betta unimaculata (Popta, 1905)

Synonyms
- Parophiocephalus unimaculatus Popta, 1905

Species of fish

Betta unimaculata, the Howong betta, is a species of labyrinth fish endemic to the island of Borneo where it is only known from the eastern portion of the island. This species grows to a length of 12.6 centimetres (5.0 in) TL, one of the largest known species of Betta. This species is also found in the aquarium trade.
