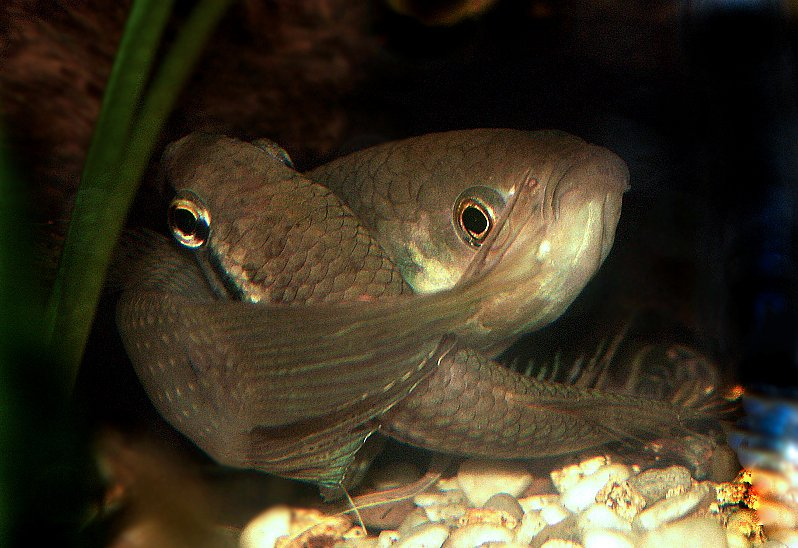

Conservation status
- Critically Endangered (IUCN 3.1)

Scientific classification
- Domain: Eukaryota
- Kingdom: Animalia
- Phylum: Chordata
- Class: Actinopterygii
- Order: Anabantiformes
- Family: Osphronemidae
- Genus: Betta
- Species: B. fusca

Binomial name
- Betta fusca Regan, 1910

= Betta fusca =

Species of fish

Betta fusca, commonly known as the dusky betta, is a species of gourami. It is a freshwater fish native to Asia, where it occurs on the island of Sumatra in Indonesia. The species reaches 8.2 cm (3.2 inches) in total length and is known to be a mouthbrooder and a facultative air-breather.
