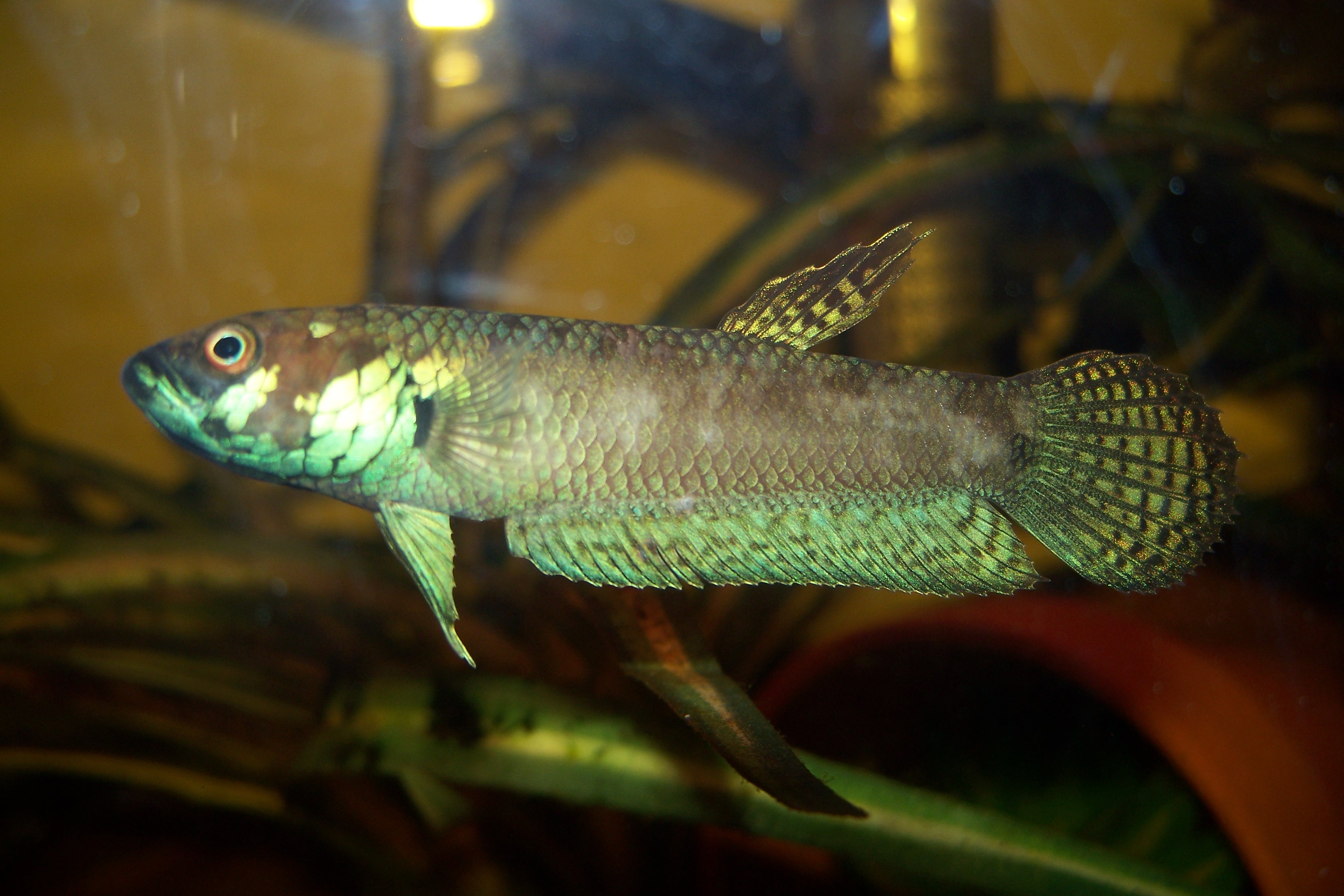
- Male Betta pallifina
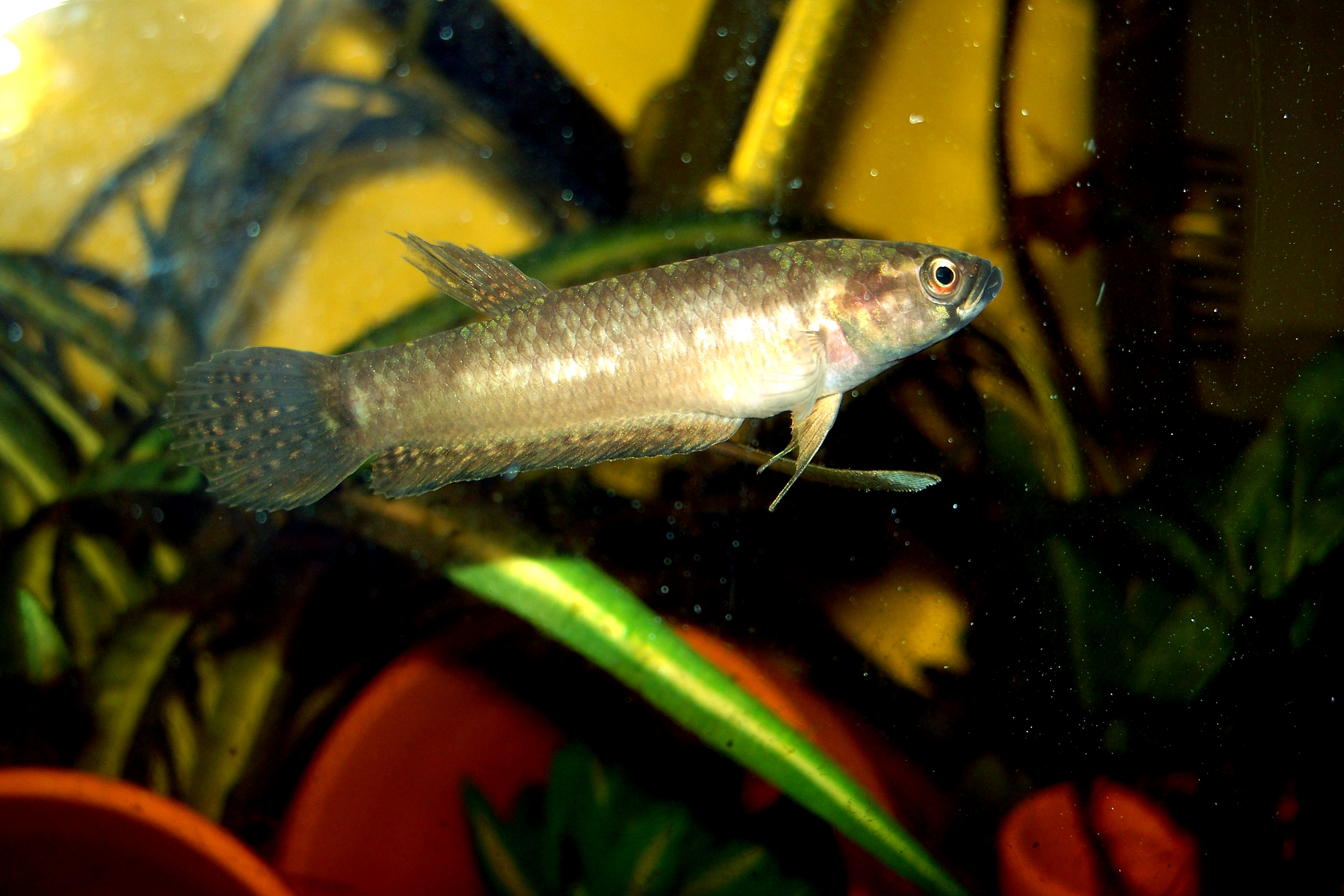
- Female Betta pallifina

Conservation status
- Data Deficient (IUCN 3.1)

Scientific classification
- Kingdom: Animalia
- Phylum: Chordata
- Class: Actinopterygii
- Order: Anabantiformes
- Family: Osphronemidae
- Genus: Betta
- Species: B. pallifina

Binomial name
- Betta pallifina H. H. Tan & P. K. L. Ng, 2005

= Betta pallifina =

Species of fish

Betta pallifina is a species of gourami endemic to the island of Borneo.

== Description ==
This species can reach a length of 6.6 centimetres (2.6 in) SL. The dorsal fin has seven to nine soft rays, the pectoral fin eleven to fourteen and the anal fin twenty-seven to thirty-two. There are thirty-two to thirty-four scales along the lateral line. Coloring is very vivid, especially in the males. They are a tan/brown, with green and blue iridescence, more noticeable in the males. Adult males' gill plates are adorned with metallic scales that range from sky blue to gold, depending on the lighting. They have a black spot on the base of their caudal fins which are lanceolate in shape. Females have a hyaline band near the outer edges of their anal and caudal fins.

== Distribution and habitat ==
Betta pallifina is only known from clear forest streams in the upper Barito River basin in Central Kalimantan, Indonesia. These streams have soft sandy or leaf-litter bottoms with dense marginal plants and patches of aquatic vegetation. The water temperature in which these fish are found is typically 77–79 °F (25–26 °C), with the pH ranging from 6.6 to 7.4.

== Reproduction ==
Betta pallifina are a mouthbrooding species of betta. The male is the caretaker, holding the fry in his mouth for up to three weeks. In captivity, these fish are very easy to breed. During spawning, which can take several hours, the male embraces the female. Fertilized eggs are gathered into the male's mouth and he retreats to brood the fry when spawning is complete. Parents do not predate the fry when they are released.

== Care ==
Betta pallifina are relatively undemanding when it comes to care of bettas. They tolerate harder water conditions than most of their relatives. They adapt quickly to life in captivity. They should be kept in species-only tanks; one pair can comfortably occupy a 24-inch tank (60 centimeters), while two pairs should be kept in a 30-inch tank (75 centimeters). The tank should have many hiding places, plants, and driftwood. pH should be kept in the range of 6.6-7.4, though a level that is under or over this is fine if kept stable. Feeding is easy, as they will readily take most foods offered. As for any fish, it is recommended that the tank is cycled to prevent ammonia or nitrites from harming the fish. Water current caused by a filter does not cause problems with Betta pallifina, since they come from forest streams and can handle current better than most species of Betta. They will eat a large variety of live foods, such as white worms (Enchytraeus albidus), grindal worms (Enchytraeus buchholzi), wingless fruit flies (Drosophila melanogaster), and brine shrimp. Captive fish will readily take pelleted and flake foods, as well as frozen and freeze dried foods, though these should be soaked prior to feeding. Fry should be fed baby brine shrimp, microworms, or infusoria.
