= Betta pallida =

Scientific classification
- Kingdom: Animalia
- Phylum: Chordata
- Class: Actinopterygii
- Order: Anabantiformes
- Family: Osphronemidae
- Genus: Betta
- Species: B. pallida

Binomial name
- Betta pallida Schindler & Schmidt, 2004

Species of fish

Betta pallida is a species of gourami. It is a freshwater fish native to Asia, where it is known only from Thailand. It is typically found in clear, slow-flowing creek environments with a depth of 20 to 50 cm (7.9 to 19.7 inches), a pH of 6.3 to 6.5, a conductivity of 69 to 82 μS/cm, a temperature of 25.5 to 26.6 °C (77.9 to 79.9 °F), and dense leaf litter. The species reaches 3.4 cm (1.3 inches) in standard length and is known to be a facultative air-breather. Its specific name, pallida, is derived from Latin and refers to its pale coloration.
