= Betta ideii =

Conservation status
- Data Deficient (IUCN 3.1)

Scientific classification
- Domain: Eukaryota
- Kingdom: Animalia
- Phylum: Chordata
- Class: Actinopterygii
- Order: Anabantiformes
- Family: Osphronemidae
- Genus: Betta
- Species: B. ideii

Binomial name
- Betta ideii Tan & Ng, 2006

Species of fish

Betta ideii is a species of gourami. It is a freshwater fish native to Asia, where it is known only from South Kalimantan on the island of Borneo in Indonesia. The species reaches 8.3 cm (3.3 inches) in standard length and is known to be a facultative air-breather. Its specific name, ideii, honors the fish collector Takashige Idei.
