= Betta stiktos =

Conservation status
- Data Deficient (IUCN 3.1)

Scientific classification
- Domain: Eukaryota
- Kingdom: Animalia
- Phylum: Chordata
- Class: Actinopterygii
- Order: Anabantiformes
- Family: Osphronemidae
- Genus: Betta
- Species: B. stiktos

Binomial name
- Betta stiktos Tan & Ng, 2005

Species of fish

Betta stiktos is a species of gourami. It is native to Asia, where it occurs in the Mekong basin in Cambodia. The species reaches 2.8 cm (1.1 inches) in standard length and is known to be a facultative air-breather. It is sometimes seen in the aquarium trade, and the species was reportedly feared to be possibly extinct prior to its reappearance within the trade.
