= Betta pulchra =

Conservation status
- Data Deficient (IUCN 3.1)

Scientific classification
- Kingdom: Animalia
- Phylum: Chordata
- Class: Actinopterygii
- Order: Anabantiformes
- Family: Osphronemidae
- Genus: Betta
- Species: B. pulchra

Binomial name
- Betta pulchra H. H. Tan & S. H. Tan, 1996

Species of fish

Betta pulchra is a species of gourami endemid that is found in Johor, Malaysia. It is an inhabitant of the acidic black waters of peat swamps where it is found amongst vegetation. This species grows to a length of 5.6 centimetres (2.2 in) SL.
