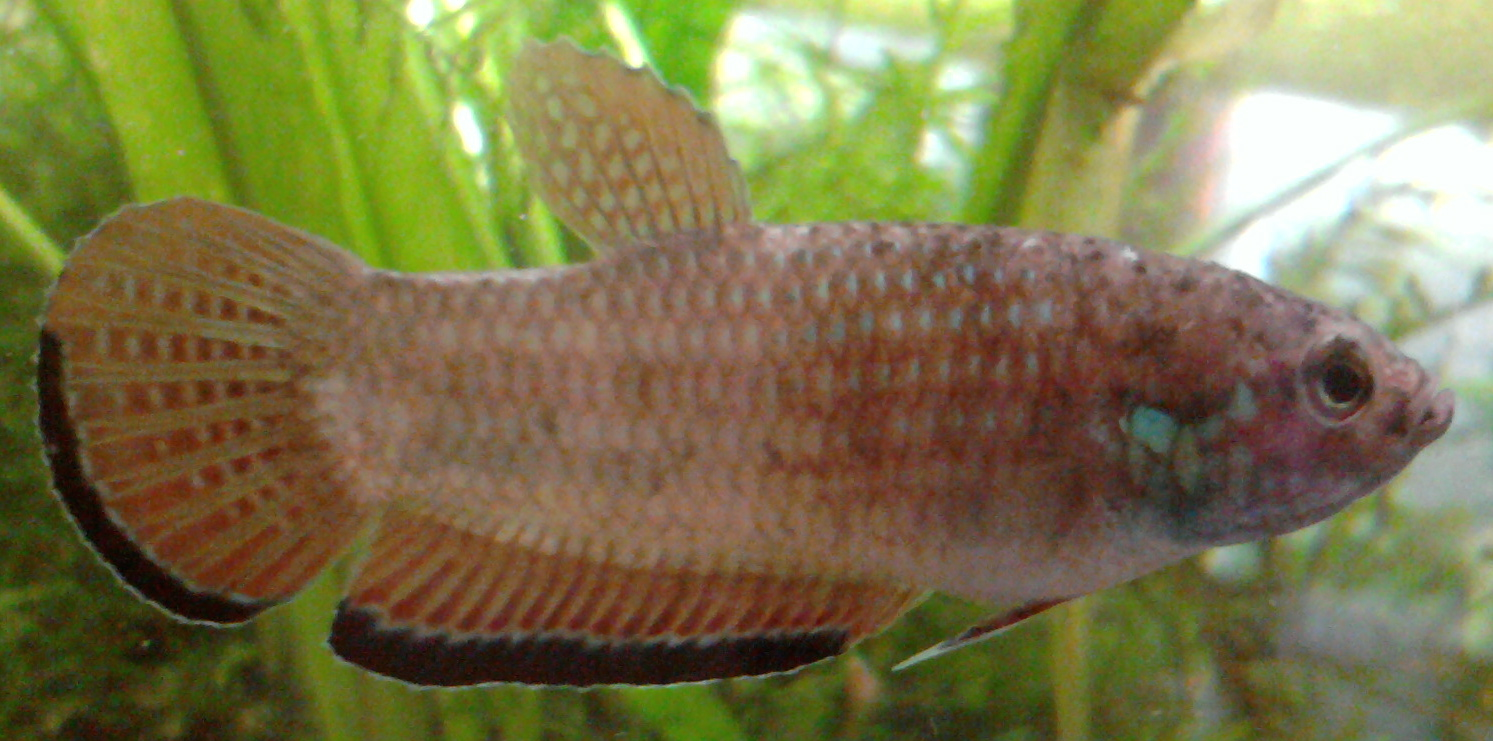

Conservation status
- Critically Endangered (IUCN 3.1)

Scientific classification
- Kingdom: Animalia
- Phylum: Chordata
- Class: Actinopterygii
- Order: Anabantiformes
- Family: Osphronemidae
- Genus: Betta
- Species: B. simplex

Binomial name
- Betta simplex Kottelat, 1994

= Krabi mouth-brooding betta =

Species of fish

The Krabi mouth-brooding betta (Betta simplex) is a species of gourami endemic to Krabi Province, Thailand. It inhabits karst springs and wetlands, where it lives amongst vegetation close to the banks. This species can reach a length of 8 cm (3 in). This species can also be found in the aquarium trade and is taken from the wild for this purpose. The International Union for Conservation of Nature has assessed it as being "critically endangered" due to over-exploitation and the degradation of its restricted habitat by pollution and development of the surrounding land for farming.

== Description ==
The Krabi mouth-brooding betta is an oblong fish with rounded fins, growing to a length of about 8 cm (3 in). The basic colour is yellowish-brown or greyish-brown with three faint longitudinal stripes. The gill-cover has a bluish-green patch and the fins have a blue iridescence. The pelvic fins are short and the anal fin long, with a dark margin. The caudal-fin is rounded and undivided.

== Distribution and habitat ==
This species is known from a single location in Krabi Province, Thailand, where its total area of occupation is less than 10 km^{2} (3.9 sq mi). It lives in a limestone area where water flows from aquifers through the karst limestone to form pools and streams of clear, neutral to alkaline water. The fish usually congregate under overhanging vegetation in the streams and ditches.

== Ecology ==
Bettas are known as anabantids because they have a special lung-like labyrinthine organ in its head which enables them to obtain oxygen direct from the air. For this reason, they can live in water with very little dissolved oxygen, and can survive out of water for a short time as long as they remain damp. They are also efficient jumpers.

The Krabi mouth-brooding betta probably feeds on insects, crustaceans, other small invertebrates and zooplankton. This fish is a paternal mouth brooder; the male fish takes the fertilised eggs into his mouth and keeps them there until they hatch.

== Status ==
B. simplex has a very small total area of occurrence which puts it at risk from habitat destruction by run-off of chemicals from agricultural land and by tourism. This species is also threatened by over-exploitation, with fish being collected for the aquarium trade and used locally as bait when fishing for eels. For these reasons, the International Union for Conservation of Nature has assessed the conservation status of this fish as being "critically endangered".
