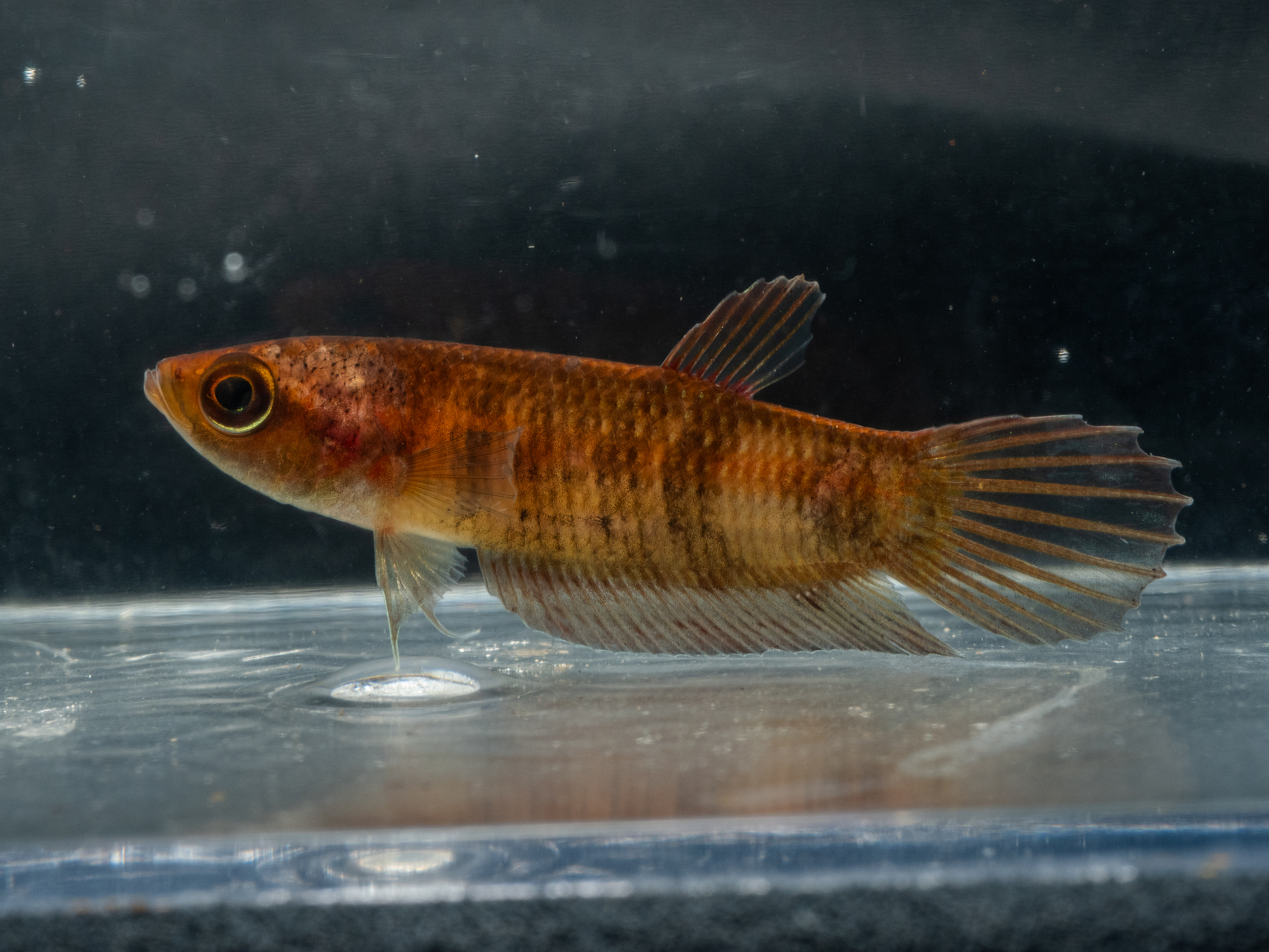

Conservation status
- Least Concern (IUCN 3.1)

Scientific classification
- Kingdom: Animalia
- Phylum: Chordata
- Class: Actinopterygii
- Order: Anabantiformes
- Family: Osphronemidae
- Genus: Betta
- Species: B. anabatoides

Binomial name
- Betta anabatoides Bleeker, 1851

= Giant betta =

Species of fish

The giant betta (Betta anabatoides) is a species of freshwater ray-finned fish in the subfamily Macropodusinae, part of the gourami family. It is endemic to South Kalimantan, Katingan, and Sampit in Indonesian Borneo. It is found in a variety of freshwater habitats and is a paternal mouthbrooder. The species reaches 8.2 cm (3.2 in) in standard length and is known to be a facultative air-breather.
