= Betta strohi =

Scientific classification
- Domain: Eukaryota
- Kingdom: Animalia
- Phylum: Chordata
- Class: Actinopterygii
- Order: Anabantiformes
- Family: Osphronemidae
- Genus: Betta
- Species: B. strohi

Binomial name
- Betta strohi Schaller & Kottelat, 1989

Species of fish

Betta strohi is a species of gourami endemic to Indonesia. This species grows to a length of 7 centimetres (2.8 in) TL.

Its specific name honours the German priest and missionary H. Stroh who returned to Germany with examples of this species of which he was the discoverer.

This taxon may be a synonym of Betta foerschi.
