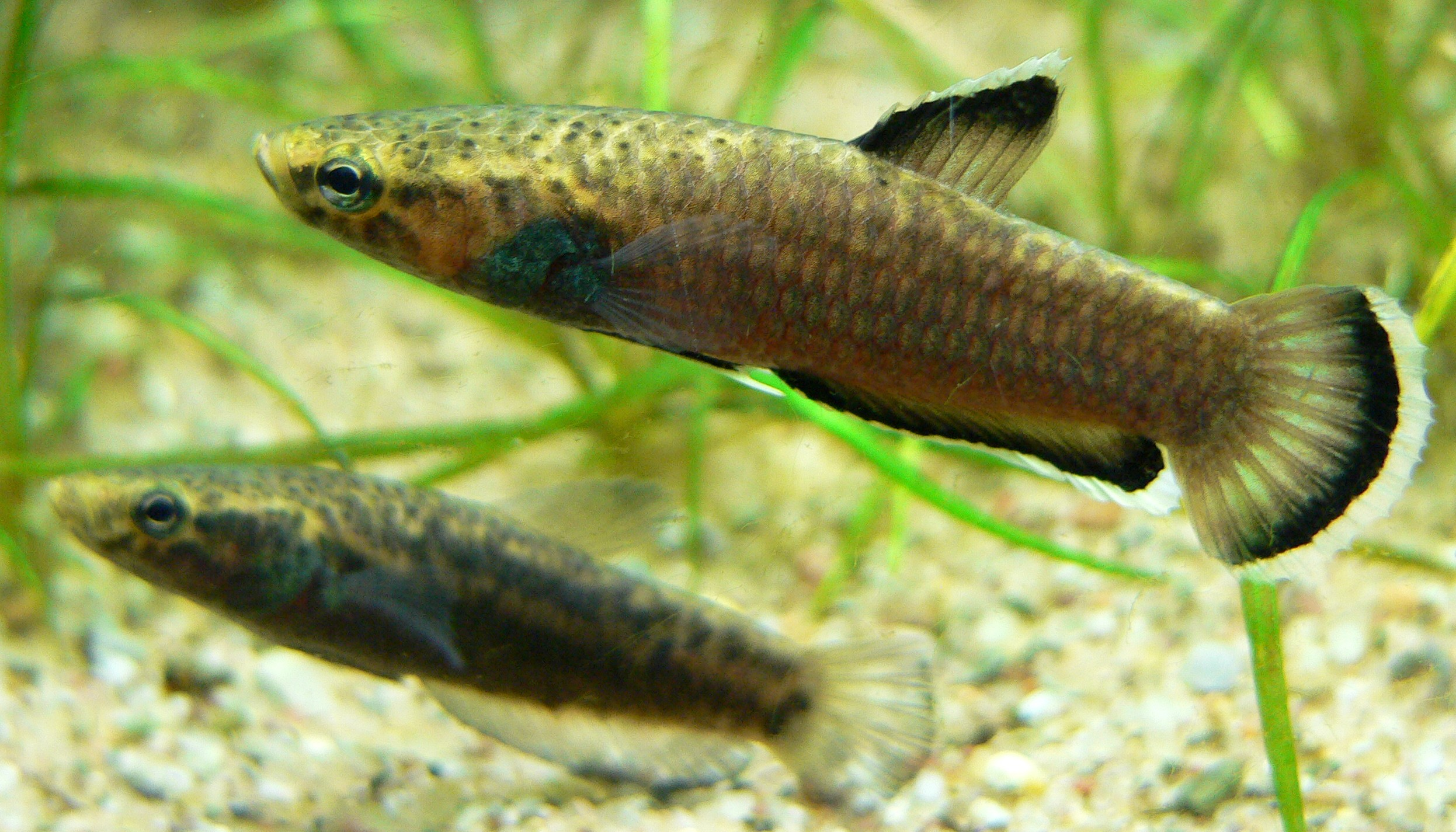

Conservation status
- Endangered (IUCN 3.1)

Scientific classification
- Kingdom: Animalia
- Phylum: Chordata
- Class: Actinopterygii
- Order: Anabantiformes
- Family: Osphronemidae
- Genus: Betta
- Species: B. albimarginata

Binomial name
- Betta albimarginata Kottelat & P. K. L. Ng, 1994

= Betta albimarginata =

Species of fish

Betta albimarginata is a species of betta fish, endemic to the island of Borneo where it is only found in the Indonesian province of Kalimantan Timur. It inhabits the shallows (5 to 10 cm (2.0 to 3.9 in)) of forest streams amongst vegetation and debris along the shores. This species grows to a length of 2.8 cm (1.1 in). It is a mouthbrooding species.

They are considered endangered under the IUCN red list documentation.
