= Betta midas =

Conservation status
- Vulnerable (IUCN 3.1)

Scientific classification
- Kingdom: Animalia
- Phylum: Chordata
- Class: Actinopterygii
- Order: Anabantiformes
- Family: Osphronemidae
- Genus: Betta
- Species: B. midas

Binomial name
- Betta midas Tan, 2009

Species of gourami

Betta midas is a species of gourami in the genus Betta. It is native to Asia, specifically the island of Borneo, where it occurs in the Kapuas River basin in West Kalimantan in Indonesia, as well as western Sarawak in Malaysia. It is typically found in acidic blackwater rivers in remnant and intact peat swamp forests. The species reaches 6.6 cm (2.6 in) in standard length and is known to be a facultative air-breather.
