= Betta aurigans =

Conservation status
- Data Deficient (IUCN 3.1)

Scientific classification
- Kingdom: Animalia
- Phylum: Chordata
- Class: Actinopterygii
- Order: Anabantiformes
- Family: Osphronemidae
- Genus: Betta
- Species: B. aurigans

Binomial name
- Betta aurigans H. H. Tan & K. K. P. Lim, 2004

Species of gourami

Betta aurigans is a species of gourami endemic to Indonesian Borneo, specifically the island of Natuna Besar, north-west of the island of Borneo. The species name aurigans is so named after the Latin for gold (aurum), due to the golden colouring of the scales of the fish. According to Linke, they live in "blackwater swamp regions." As a species from the B. akarensis cluster of closely related species and from its locality, it has been speculated that Betta akarensis is 5 cm (1.96 in). It is also speculated that Betta aurigans feeds on plankton and small invertebrates. It is a mouthbrooder.
