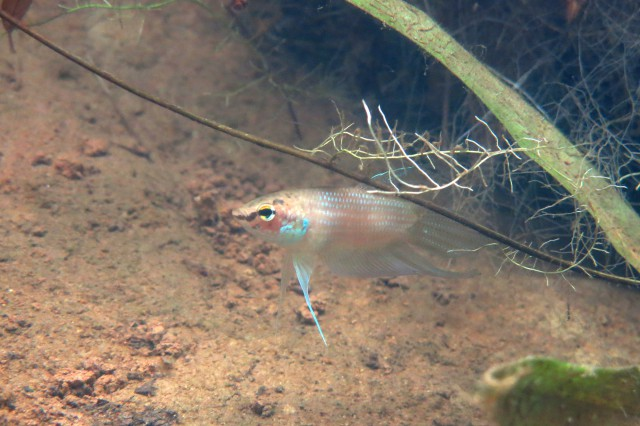

Conservation status
- Data Deficient (IUCN 3.1)

Scientific classification
- Kingdom: Animalia
- Phylum: Chordata
- Class: Actinopterygii
- Order: Anabantiformes
- Family: Osphronemidae
- Genus: Betta
- Species: B. ferox

Binomial name
- Betta ferox Schindler. and Schmidt, 2006

= Betta ferox =

Species of fish

Betta ferox is a species of gourami endemic to Thailand. It is only found in rivers in Songkhla Province, where it resides along shallow riverbanks among vegetation. This species grows to a length of 6.3 centimetres (2.5 in) SL. This species is closely related to Betta pugnax and is also a paternal mouthbrooder. Males and females are dimorphic, with males displaying elongated ventral fins, elongated caudal fins, and green coloration on the gill plates. Females typically display two horizontal brown bars across their bodies, shorter fins, and a more rounded body shape.
