= Betta obscura =

Conservation status
- Data Deficient (IUCN 3.1)

Scientific classification
- Kingdom: Animalia
- Phylum: Chordata
- Class: Actinopterygii
- Order: Anabantiformes
- Family: Osphronemidae
- Genus: Betta
- Species: B. obscura

Binomial name
- Betta obscura H. H. Tan & P. K. L. Ng, 2005

Species of fish

Betta obscura (obscura meaning "dark in color") is a species of gourami that occurs in the Barito basin in Kalimantan Tengah, Indonesia. This species is a mouthbrooder, and grows to a length of around 9 centimetres (3.5 in) SL.
