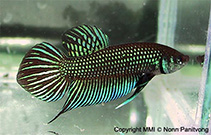

Scientific classification
- Kingdom: Animalia
- Phylum: Chordata
- Class: Actinopterygii
- Order: Anabantiformes
- Family: Osphronemidae
- Genus: Betta
- Species: B. mahachaiensis

Binomial name
- Betta mahachaiensis Kowasupat, Panijpan, Ruenwongsa & Sriwattanarothai, 2012

= Betta mahachaiensis =

Species of fish

Betta mahachaiensis is a species of bubble-nesting betta native to Thailand, where it occurs naturally near the Gulf of Thailand. It is typically seen in stagnant waters in swamps, pools, and ponds. The species can be found in brackish waters, with salinity levels between 1.1 and 10.6 parts per thousand. Betta mahachaiensis is capable of living in both fresh water and brackish water, a trait unique among fish in the genus Betta. This species grows to a length of 5 to 6 cm (2.0 to 2.4 in). It is found in the aquarium trade.

Betta mahachaiensis was discovered in 2012 by a team of biologists from Thailand led by Dr. Bhinyo Panijpan's Mahidol University research group (with PhD candidate Mr. Chanon Kowasupat.). It was found in the province of Samut Sakhon in Thailand, and its specific name is a derivation of the well-known Thai name for the sub-district. It can be found also in western of Bangkok and small area in Samut Prakan province. Male individuals of the species are distinguished from species such as Betta splendens by iridescent green-blue stripes on a brown-black background. The main key character that easily use for classification from other members in B. splendens complex is the absence of the red bar on the opercular membrane that make it completely black. This was observed and discovered by Chanon Kowasupat in the laboratory mentioned in publication.

The publication of "Betta mahachaiensis, a new species of bubble-nesting fighting fish (Teleostei: Osphronemidae) from Samut Sakhon Province, Thailand" was the most-accessed paper of year 2012 of the Zootaxa journal with 15,184 times.

As labyrinth fish, Betta mahachaiensis have a pair of suprabranchial chambers that each house an air-breathing organ known as the labyrinth organ, a complex bony structure lined with thin, highly vascularised respiratory epithelium. The labyrinth organ is a morpho-physiological adaptation that allows labyrinth fish to extract oxygen from air.

Betta mahachaiensis is critically endangered (CR) in the IUCN red list.
