= Betta nuluhon =

Scientific classification
- Kingdom: Animalia
- Phylum: Chordata
- Class: Actinopterygii
- Order: Anabantiformes
- Family: Osphronemidae
- Genus: Betta
- Species: B. nuluhon

Binomial name
- Betta nuluhon Kamal, Tan & Ng, 2020

Species of fish

Betta nuluhon is a species of gourami. It is native to Asia, where it occurs in western Sabah on the island of Borneo in Malaysia. The species reaches at least 7.06 cm (2.8 inches) in standard length. It was first described in 2020. FishBase does not list this species. It was seen in the Crocker Mountains in Borneo. It is a mouthbrooder.

== Etymology ==
The genus name Betta is derived from the Malay term "ikan betah", which means "persistent fish". The species name, however, comes from the Kadazan-dusun term for a hill, nuluhon. This is because of the hill streams Betta nuluhon was discovered in.

== Description ==
Betta nuluhon are brown to dark brown with body scales rimmed with bright blue. A dark stripe extends from the upper jaw through the eye to the opercle edge, a dark suborbital stripe and a chin bar are present. The body consists of a yellow dorsal region, black lateral regions, and a reddish ventral region. Male B. nuluhon may exhibit a greenish-blue iridescence on the opercle. The dorsal fin is brown with 4 to 6 traverse bars, the caudal fin has 12 to 16 dark transverse bars, the anal fin is plain with a reddish-brown margin, and the pelvic fin has a whitish second filamentous ray. The fish examined for this study had standard lengths from 39.8 to 62.6 mm.

== Distribution and habitat ==
Contrary to the trend of being situated in stagnant peat swamps with a low pH and little to no dissolved oxygen of most species of the Betta genus, Betta nuluhon is found in hill streams with fast-flowing, high-oxygen, and a neutral pH. It is found in the Crocker Range Nature Reserve in Western Sabah.
