= Betta omega =

Conservation status
- Critically Endangered (IUCN 3.1)

Scientific classification
- Kingdom: Animalia
- Phylum: Chordata
- Class: Actinopterygii
- Order: Anabantiformes
- Family: Osphronemidae
- Genus: Betta
- Species: B. omega

Binomial name
- Betta omega Tan & Ahmad, 2018

Species of fish

Betta omega is a species of Anabantoid. It is native to Asia, where it occurs in the state of Johor in Malaysia. The species reaches 14.77 cm (5.8 inches) in total length. It was described in 2018 by Heok Hui Tan (of the National University of Singapore) and Amirrudin B. Ahmad (of the Universiti Malaysia Terengganu) based on its distinctive patterning. It is assessed as critically endangered by the IUCN.
