= Betta iaspis =

Scientific classification
- Kingdom: Animalia
- Phylum: Chordata
- Class: Actinopterygii
- Order: Anabantiformes
- Family: Osphronemidae
- Genus: Betta
- Species: B. iaspis

Binomial name
- Betta iaspis Jiali, Wen, Haryono, Wentian & Wanchang, 2025

New betta species from Indonesia

Betta iaspis is a betta species native to Sumatra Island, Indonesia. The species name, iaspis, is derived from the Greek word for the gemstone jasper, referring to this combination of iridescent blue/green and reddish fins. It has a rounded head and slender body. Betta iaspis is only found in forest peat swamp, which is usually adjacent to oil palm plantations.

== Morphology and description ==
Betta iaspis, a member of the Betta coccina complex, is a small, slender species with type specimens measuring 17.7–23.9 mm SL. Males have a dark blackish body, a reddish-brown head, and a dark brown dorsum. The dorsal and caudal fins are plain red with a bright bluish margin, while the anal fin is blackish with reddish posterior patches. Males also have a lanceolate caudal fin and elongated posterior anal-fin rays, whereas females have a rounded caudal fin. The species is distinguished by its short dorsal-fin base, 8–10 dorsal-fin rays, and 5–6 subdorsal scales.

== Habitat and distribution ==
Betta iaspis is currently known only from a forest peat swamp in Jambi, Sumatra Island, Indonesia. The fish inhabits a small peat swamp area that is vulnerable to drying up during the dry season. The habitat usually having an acidic pH of 5.0 and a temperature of 29.8∘C. When the swamp partly dries up, the fish hide in the moist mud beneath dead leaves on the ground. They return to the water's surface when the habitat is re-flooded during the rainy season.

== Diet ==
The specific diet of Betta iaspis has not been documented, but like all species in the genus Betta, it is a carnivore that feeds primarily on small aquatic invertebrates and terrestrial insects.

== Reproduction and development ==
Betta iaspis reproduces during the rainy season when the peat swamp habitat is fully replenished with water. The species exhibits sexual dimorphism. Females in breeding condition were noted in the field, sometimes showing dark stripes on the body. The filamentous posterior rays of the male's anal fin often become elongated, sometimes reaching half the length of the caudal fin in mature individuals.
