= Toba betta =

Conservation status
- Endangered (IUCN 3.1)

Scientific classification
- Kingdom: Animalia
- Phylum: Chordata
- Class: Actinopterygii
- Order: Anabantiformes
- Family: Osphronemidae
- Genus: Betta
- Species: B. rubra

Binomial name
- Betta rubra Perugia, 1893

Species of fish

The Toba betta (Betta rubra) is a species of gourami endemic to Sumatra, Indonesia where it is an inhabitant of peat swamps. The species grows to a length of 5 centimetres (2.0 in) TL, and it can also be found in the aquarium trade.

== Parental care ==
Unlike Betta splendens which is a bubble nest builder, the Toba betta is a mouthbrooding fish.
