= Betta mandor =

Conservation status
- Endangered (IUCN 3.1)

Scientific classification
- Kingdom: Animalia
- Phylum: Chordata
- Class: Actinopterygii
- Order: Anabantiformes
- Family: Osphronemidae
- Genus: Betta
- Species: B. mandor

Binomial name
- Betta mandor H. H. Tan & P. K. L. Ng, 2006

Species of fish

Betta mandor is a species of gourami endemic to the island of Borneo where it is only known from the Indonesian province of Kalimantan Barat where it is found in the Kapuas basin. It is an inhabitant of streams and pools in forested swamps, usually found in quite shallow waters. It feeds on insects and other small invertebrate prey. This species can reach a length of 5.7 centimetres (2.2 in) TL. This species can also be found in the aquarium trade.
