= Betta brownorum =

Conservation status
- Vulnerable (IUCN 3.1)

Scientific classification
- Kingdom: Animalia
- Phylum: Chordata
- Class: Actinopterygii
- Division: Teleostei
- Order: Anabantiformes
- Family: Osphronemidae
- Genus: Betta
- Species: B. brownorum

Binomial name
- Betta brownorum K. E. Witte & J. Schmidt, 1992

Species of fish

Brown's betta (Betta brownorum) is a species of betta that is native to the island of Borneo in Indonesia and Malaysia. It is an inhabitant of peat swamps, where it occurs in very shallow waters. This species grows to a length of 2.6–4 cm (1.0–1.6 in). There needs to be 20 litres (5.2 gallons) in an aquarium containing only this species of betta, but like other bettas, they are territorial. This fish has a rectangular brick-red body. This betta is diurnal and is makes a bubblenest. It has a labyrinth, enabling air-breathing.
