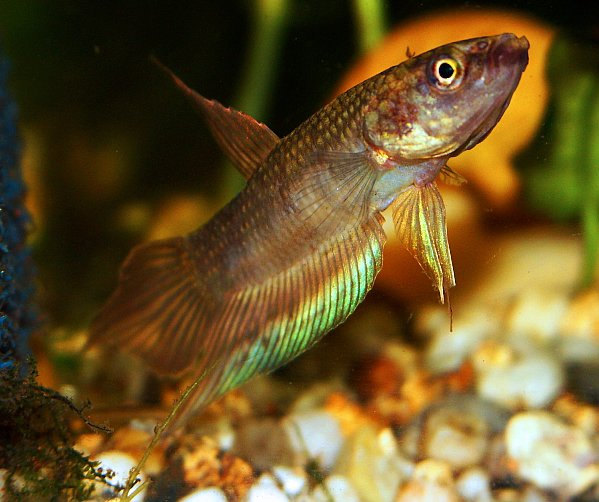

Conservation status
- Vulnerable (IUCN 3.1)

Scientific classification
- Kingdom: Animalia
- Phylum: Chordata
- Class: Actinopterygii
- Order: Anabantiformes
- Family: Osphronemidae
- Genus: Betta
- Species: B. dimidiata

Binomial name
- Betta dimidiata T. R. Roberts, 1989

= Betta dimidiata =

Species of fish

Betta dimidiata is a species of gourami endemic to Kalimantan Barat in Indonesia. It is an inhabitant of swamp forest and forest streams, and can grow to a length of 4.6 cm (1.8 in).
