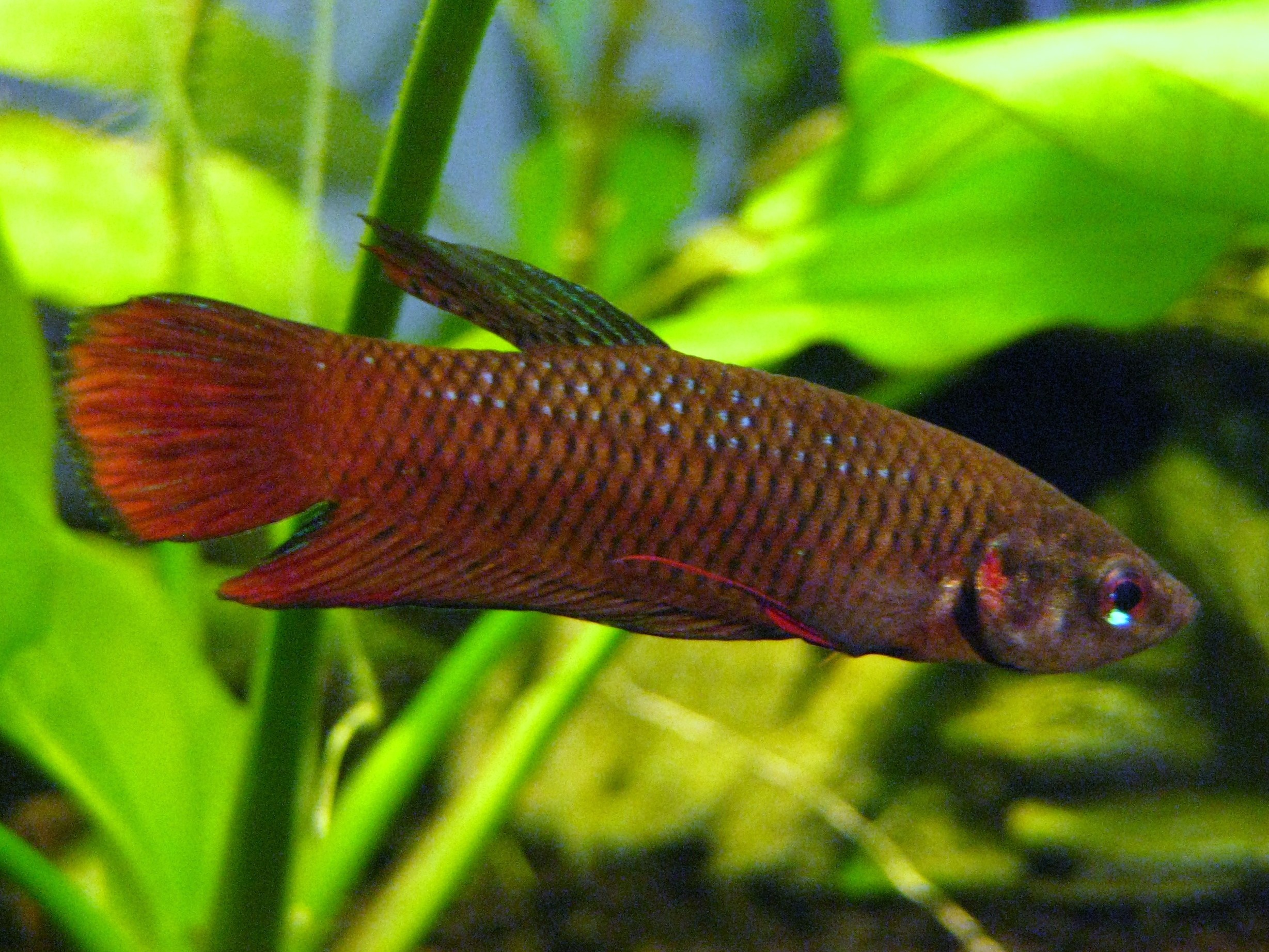

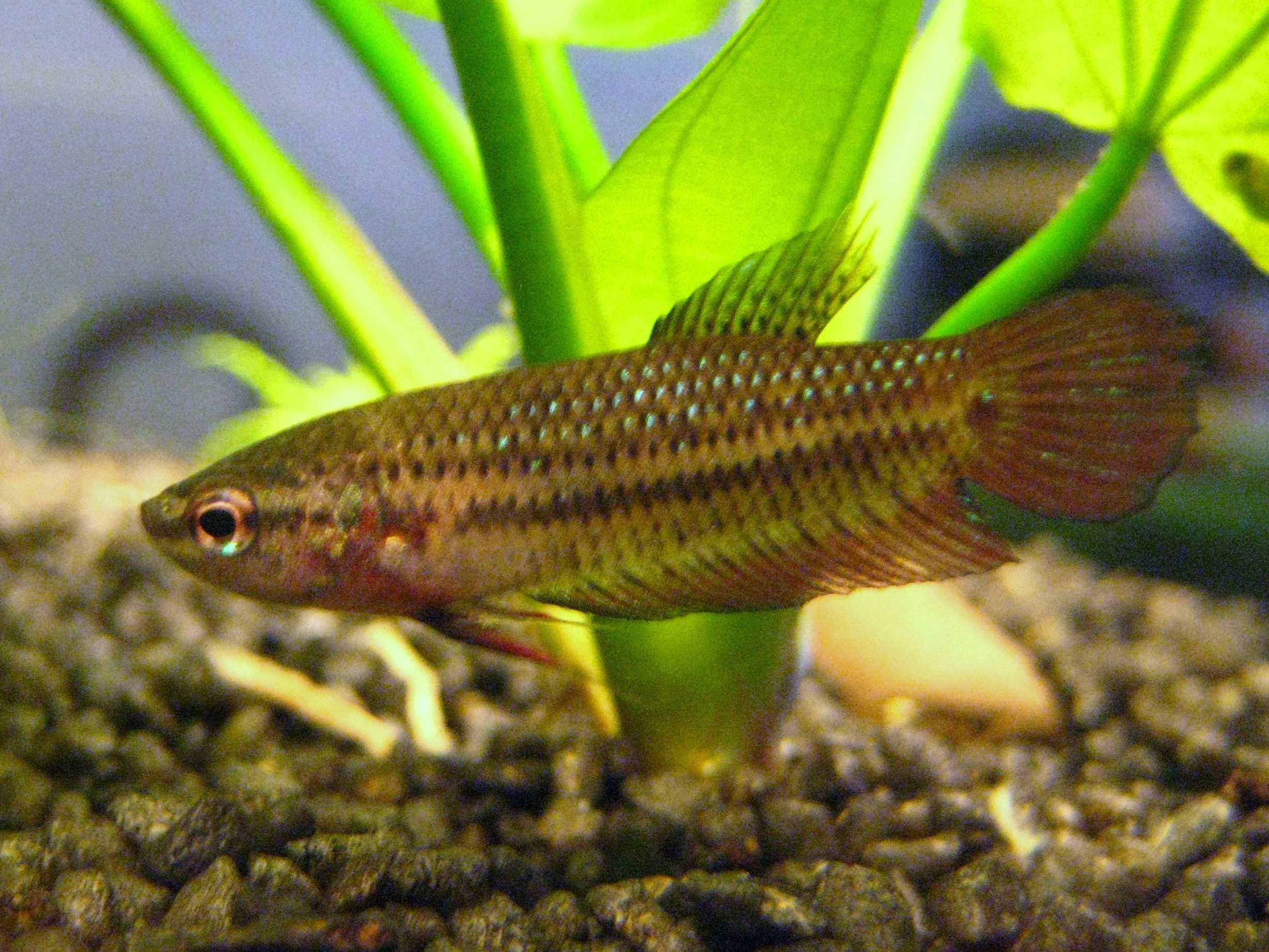
- Male (top), female (bottom)

Conservation status
- Endangered (IUCN 3.1)

Scientific classification
- Kingdom: Animalia
- Phylum: Chordata
- Class: Actinopterygii
- Order: Anabantiformes
- Family: Osphronemidae
- Genus: Betta
- Species: B. tussyae

Binomial name
- Betta tussyae Schaller, 1985

= Betta tussyae =

Species of fish

Betta tussyae is a species of gourami endemic to Malaysia where it is only known from Pahang. It is an inhabitant of peat swamps. This species grows to a length of 3.7 centimetres (1.5 in) SL. The specific name honours Tussy Nagy, the wife of the Austrian aquarist Peter Nagy, because in 1979 this couple were the first fish collectors to import this species into Europe.
