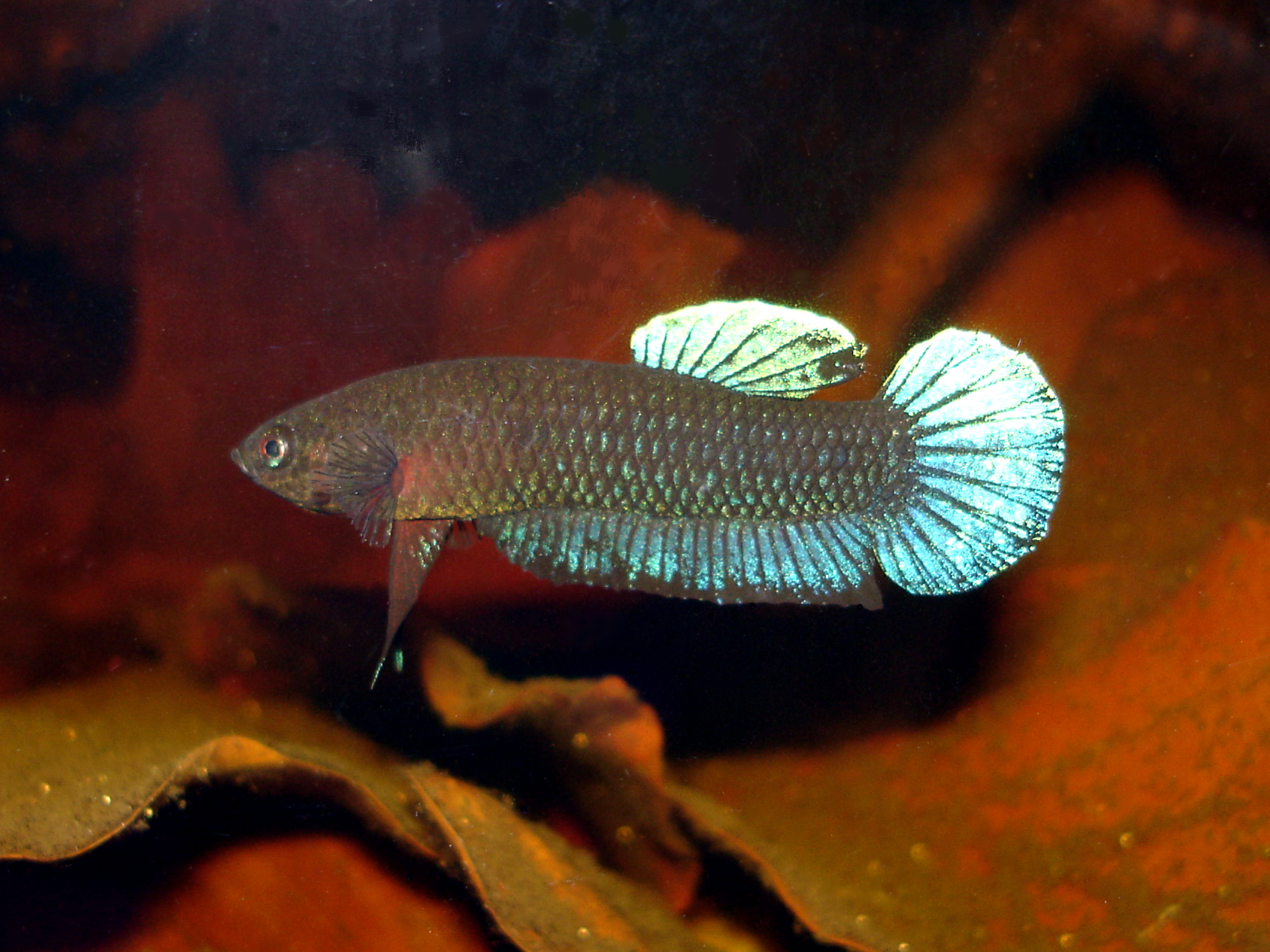
- Male Betta persephone

Conservation status
- Endangered (IUCN 3.1)

Scientific classification
- Kingdom: Animalia
- Phylum: Chordata
- Class: Actinopterygii
- Division: Teleostei
- Order: Anabantiformes
- Family: Osphronemidae
- Genus: Betta
- Species: B. persephone

Binomial name
- Betta persephone Schaller, 1986

= Betta persephone =

Species of fish

Betta persephone is a species of labyrinth fish endemic to Malaysia where it is only known from Johor.

== Etymology ==
This betta's specific epithet derives from the Greek goddess Persephone, queen of the Underworld.

Describer tropical-fish importer Dietrich Schaller clearly explained the name when he described the species in the German aquarium magazine Die Aquarien- und Terrarienzeitschrift (DATZ). According to Schaller, the name refers to how the fish adapts to environmental conditions. When water is available, it lives as any fish would, swimming above the leaf-litter substrate of peat-forest swamps and streams. When conditions are dry, however, the fish buries itself within the moist leaf litter in order to stay alive.

== Description ==
Betta persephone is a small species with a maximum length of 2.6 centimetres (1.0 in) SL. The males are largely blue-black in colour, with the females exhibiting browner tones.

== Distribution and habitat ==
Betta persephone has a limited distribution in Malaysia, the type locality being Ayer Hitam in Johor. This Betta species inhabits soft, acidic waters at temperatures of 23‒28 °C (73‒82 °F). The typical habitat is closed-canopy forest where it is dark on the forest floor and there is thick vegetation on the banks of the blackwater streams and peat swamps where this fish lives among submerged tree roots. Sometimes it may be forced to live temporarily among the wet leaf litter in periods when the peaty pools dry up.

== Ecology ==
In its natural habitat, Betta persephone feeds on insects and other small invertebrates. It is a bubble nester, creating a ball of bubbles among submerged vegetation in which to lay its eggs.

== Status ==
Betta persephone is listed as "Critically endangered" on the IUCN Red List, as its natural range is restricted to a very small and diminishing area of swampy water bodies in tropical forests. Its habitat is being diminished by the clearing of the forests to make way for oil palm cultivation. While a delicate species not easily kept in aquaria, it has been bred successfully in captivity.
