= Betta kuehnei =

Scientific classification
- Kingdom: Animalia
- Phylum: Chordata
- Class: Actinopterygii
- Division: Teleostei
- Order: Anabantiformes
- Family: Osphronemidae
- Genus: Betta
- Species: B. kuehnei

Binomial name
- Betta kuehnei I. Schindler & Schmidt, 2008

Species of fish

Betta kuehnei is a species of gourami. It is native to Asia, where it occurs in Malaysia and Thailand. It is typically found in shallow, shaded forest creeks among aquatic plants such as Cryptocoryne cordata and leaf litter. The water in which the species occurs is clear, with a pH of 7, a hardness of 3 dGH, and a temperature of 25 °C (77 °F). It is known to occur alongside the species Parosphromenus paludicola and Trichopsis vittata. The species reaches 8 cm (3.1 inches) in total length and is known to be a facultative air-breather. Males of the species exhibit mouthbrooding.
