= Betta rutilans =

Conservation status
- Critically Endangered (IUCN 3.1)

Scientific classification
- Kingdom: Animalia
- Phylum: Chordata
- Class: Actinopterygii
- Order: Anabantiformes
- Family: Osphronemidae
- Genus: Betta
- Species: B. rutilans

Binomial name
- Betta rutilans K. E. Witte & Kottelat, 1991

Species of fish

Betta rutilans is a species of gourami endemic to Indonesia. Their habitat is blackwater streams and peat swamp forests with very little sunlight. Their name rutilans is Latin for "reddish", "grow red", or "being red".

== Description ==
They typically grow up to 3–4 centimetres (1.2–1.6 in) TL in length. Like their name implies, they are typically solid red with males of the species being more intensely colored, but a few have green scales. Males have more pointed dorsal fins and longer pelvic fins. Females are generally rounder and have an egg tube. They will consume small invertebrates, like insects.

== Reproduction ==
Like most Betta fish, they breed in bubble-nests built to house the fry. Strangely enough, some have been seen to mouthbrood. The cause of this difference is unknown.

== Captivity ==
This species has been collected for use in aquariums for their intense red color. They can be housed in community tanks with proper hiding spots in place and tank adequately sized for the amount of fish and species. They are from blackwater environments and should be housed in warm water with filtering. In captivity, it lives up to 3 years.
