= Betta bellica =

Conservation status
- Least Concern (IUCN 3.1)

Scientific classification
- Kingdom: Animalia
- Phylum: Chordata
- Class: Actinopterygii
- Order: Anabantiformes
- Family: Osphronemidae
- Genus: Betta
- Species: B. bellica

Binomial name
- Betta bellica Sauvage, 1884

Synonyms
- Betta fasciata Regan, 1910

Species of fish

Betta bellica. the slim betta or slender betta, is a species of betta native to eastern Sumatra in Indonesia and Peninsular Malaysia. It is an inhabitant of swamp forests and peat swamps. This species grows to a length of 10 cm (3.9 in). It can also be found in the aquarium trade.
