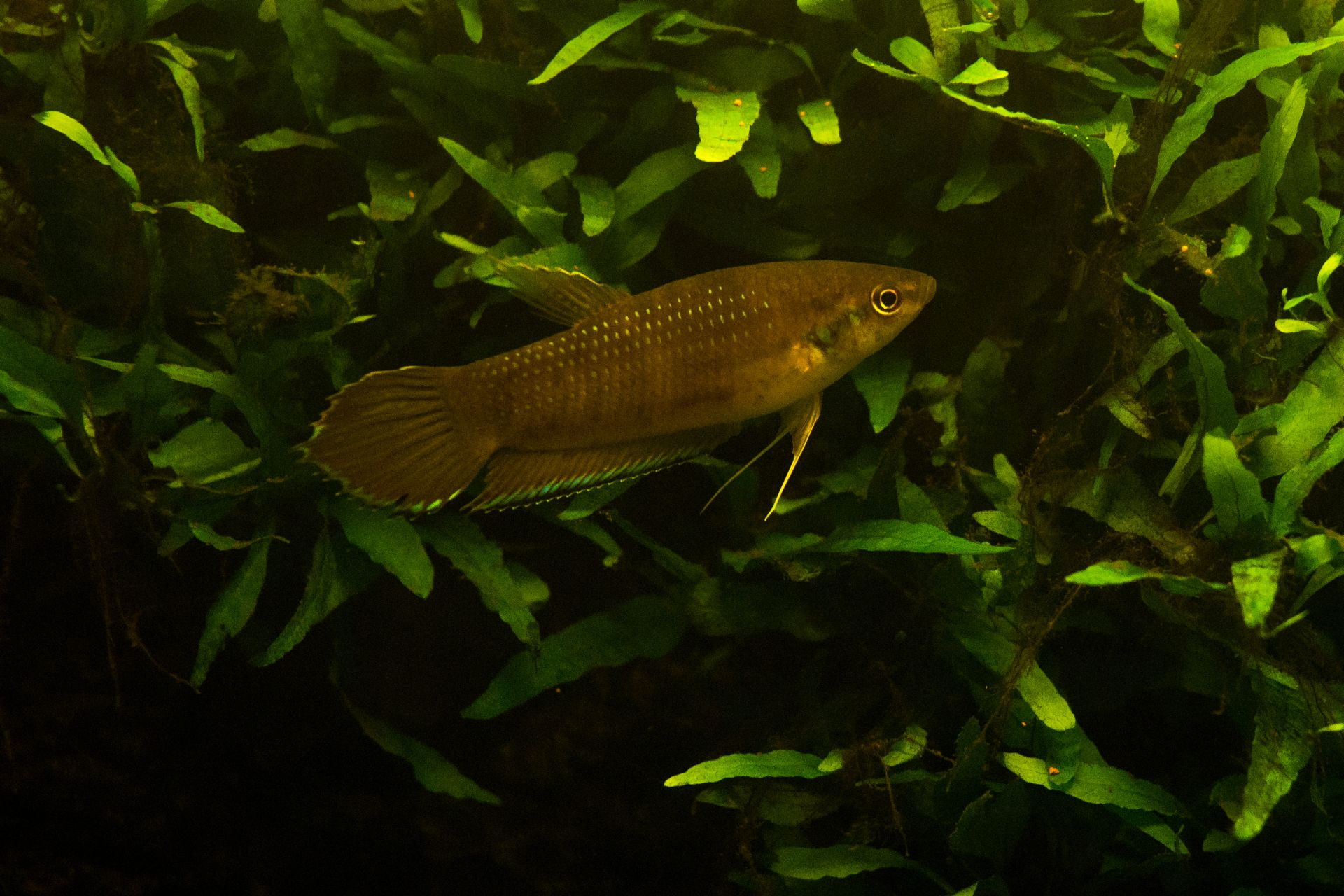

Conservation status
- Data Deficient (IUCN 3.1)

Scientific classification
- Kingdom: Animalia
- Phylum: Chordata
- Class: Actinopterygii
- Order: Anabantiformes
- Family: Osphronemidae
- Genus: Betta
- Species: B. enisae

Binomial name
- Betta enisae Kottelat, 1995

= Betta enisae =

Species of fish

Betta enisae is a species of gourami endemic to the Kapuas River basin of Indonesia. It is an inhabitant of forest streams with slightly acidic waters, and can mostly be found in the shallows amongst the leaf litter. This species grows to a length of 5.9 cm (2.3 in). It is commonly used as bait by local fishermen and has been found in the aquarium trade. The specific name of this fish honours Enis Widjanarti who assisted Kottelat in his expedition to the Kapuas Lakes.
