= Betta apollon =

Scientific classification
- Kingdom: Animalia
- Phylum: Chordata
- Class: Actinopterygii
- Order: Anabantiformes
- Family: Osphronemidae
- Genus: Betta
- Species: B. apollon

Binomial name
- Betta apollon Schindler & Schmidt, 2006

Species of fish

Betta apollon is a species of gourami. It is a freshwater fish native to Asia, where it occurs only in shaded hillstreams in Thailand. It is typically found in shallow, close-to-shore portions of streams in the vicinity of roots, plants, or leaf litter, although it may also be found in fast-flowing areas between boulders. The water in which the species occurs is usually clear, with a pH of 6.2, a conductivity of 20 to 40 μS/cm, and a temperature of 24 to 26 °C (75.2 to 78.8 °F). The species reaches 5.1 cm (2 inches) in standard length and is known to be a facultative air-breather. Its specific name, apollon, refers to the god Apollo.
