= Betta ibanorum =

Iban Fightingfish

Conservation status
- Vulnerable (IUCN 3.1)

Scientific classification
- Kingdom: Animalia
- Phylum: Chordata
- Class: Actinopterygii
- Order: Anabantiformes
- Family: Osphronemidae
- Genus: Betta
- Species: B. ibanorum

Binomial name
- Betta ibanorum H. H. Tan & P. K. L. Ng, 2004

Synonyms
- Betta climacura Vierke, 1988

Species of fish

Betta ibanorum (commonly known as the Iban fightingfish) is a species of gourami endemic to southern Sarawak in Malaysia. The species name ibanorum was named after the Iban people, the largest group of people in the Sarawak (it means "of the Iban"). This species is a mouthbrooder, and grows to a length of 8.1 centimetres (3.2 in) SL.
