= Betta krataios =

Conservation status
- Data Deficient (IUCN 3.1)

Scientific classification
- Domain: Eukaryota
- Kingdom: Animalia
- Phylum: Chordata
- Class: Actinopterygii
- Order: Anabantiformes
- Family: Osphronemidae
- Genus: Betta
- Species: B. krataios

Binomial name
- Betta krataios Tan & Ng, 2006

Species of fish

Betta krataios is a species of gourami. It is native to Asia, where it occurs in the lower Kapuas River basin in West Kalimantan on the island of Borneo in Indonesia. The species reaches 4.5 cm (1.8 inches) in standard length and is known to be a facultative air-breather. Its specific name, krataios, is derived from Greek and means "strong", referring to the relatively robust build of the species.
