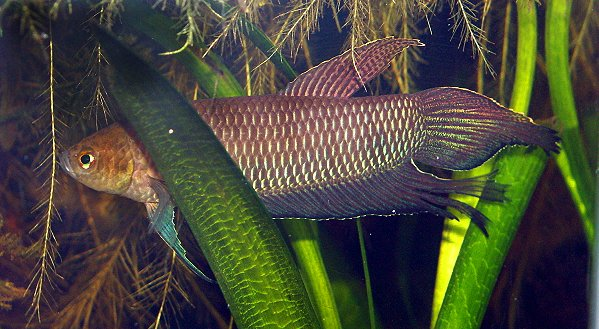

Conservation status
- Vulnerable (IUCN 3.1)

Scientific classification
- Kingdom: Animalia
- Phylum: Chordata
- Class: Actinopterygii
- Order: Anabantiformes
- Family: Osphronemidae
- Genus: Betta
- Species: B. simorum

Binomial name
- Betta simorum H. H. Tan & P. K. L. Ng, 1996

= Betta simorum =

Species of fish

Betta simorum is a species of gourami endemic to Indonesia. This species grows to a length of 6.4 centimetres (2.5 in) SL. This species can also be found in the aquarium trade. The species was named simorum and uses the Latin genitive plural "of the Sims", named so in honour of Thomas G. K. Sim and his wife Farrah, of Sindo Aquarium in Jambi, Sumatra.
