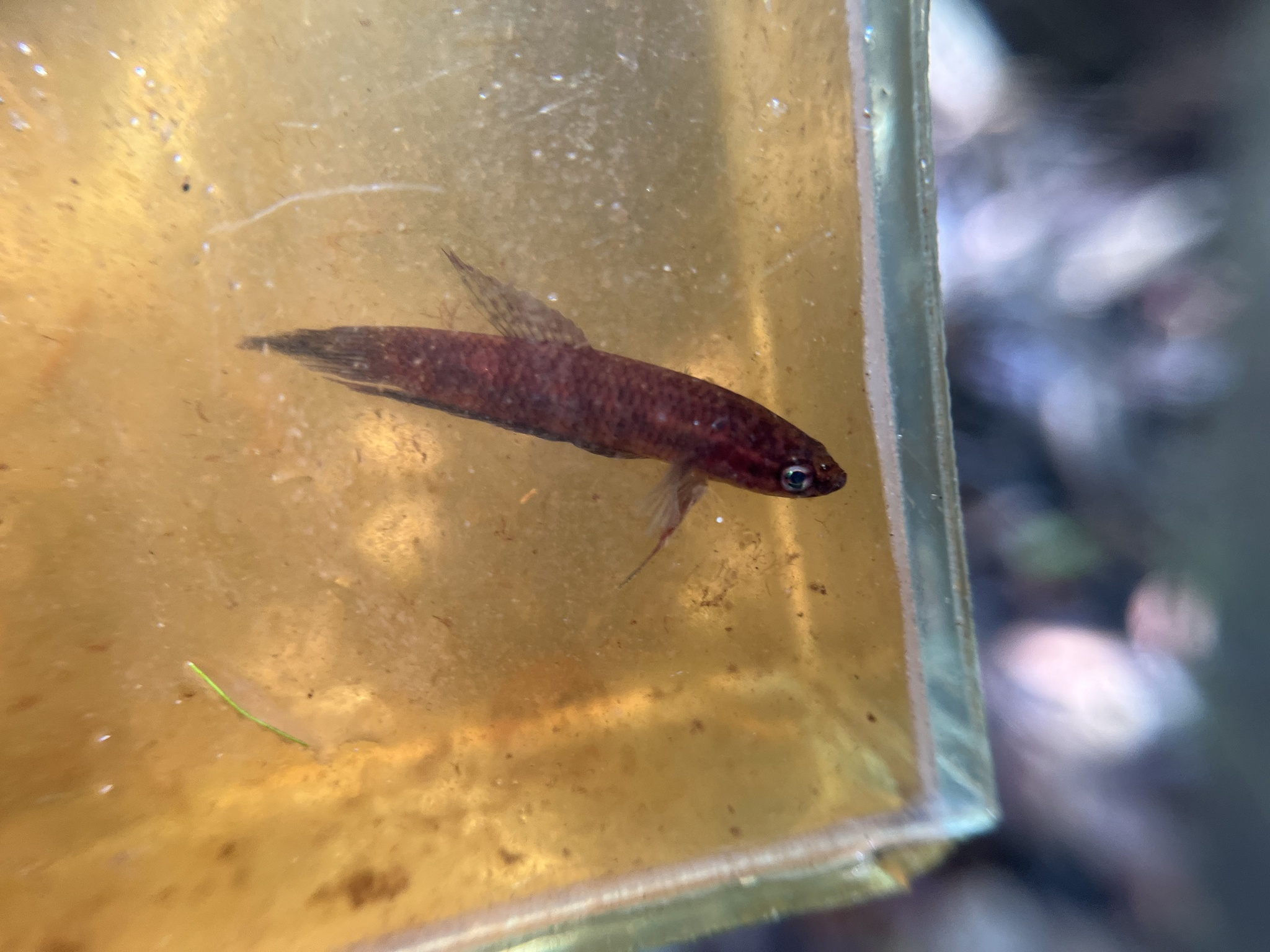

Conservation status
- Endangered (IUCN 3.1)

Scientific classification
- Kingdom: Animalia
- Phylum: Chordata
- Class: Actinopterygii
- Order: Anabantiformes
- Family: Osphronemidae
- Genus: Betta
- Species: B. livida

Binomial name
- Betta livida P. K. L. Ng & Kottelat, 1992

= Betta livida =

Species of fish

Betta livida is a species of gourami endemic to Malaysia, where it is only found in the state of Selangor. An inhabitant of peat swamps, it grows to a length of 3.6 cm (1.4 in).
