= Betta patoti =

Conservation status
- Endangered (IUCN 3.1)

Scientific classification
- Kingdom: Animalia
- Phylum: Chordata
- Class: Actinopterygii
- Order: Anabantiformes
- Family: Osphronemidae
- Genus: Betta
- Species: B. patoti

Binomial name
- Betta patoti Weber & de Beaufort, 1922

Species of fish

Betta patoti, sometimes known as the tiger betta or zebra betta, is a species of gourami. It is a freshwater fish native to Asia, where it occurs in the southern part of East Kalimantan on the island of Borneo in Indonesia. The species reaches 10.7 cm (4.2 in) in total length and is known to be a facultative air-breather.
