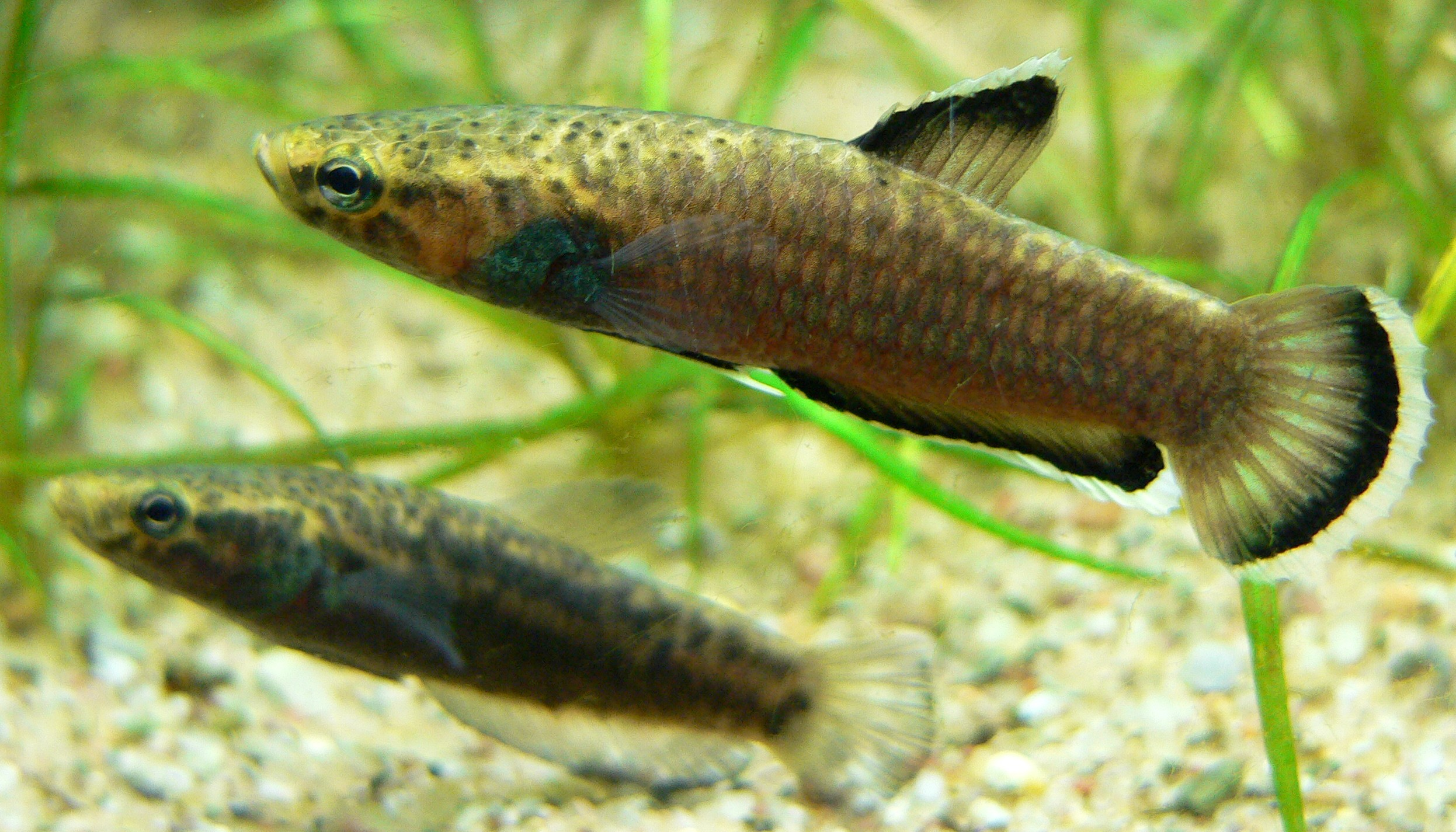
- Betta albimarginata

Scientific classification
- Kingdom: Animalia
- Phylum: Chordata
- Class: Actinopterygii
- Order: Anabantiformes
- Family: Osphronemidae
- Subfamily: Macropodusinae
- Genus: Betta; Bleeker, 1850

Type species
- Betta trifasciata Bleeker, 1850

Synonyms
- Anostoma van Hasselt, 1859; Micracanthus Sauvage, 1879; Parophiocephalus Popta, 1905; Oshimia D. S. Jordan, 1919; Pseudobetta Richter, 1981

= Betta =

Genus of fish

Betta (/ˈbɛtə/, BET-tə) is a large genus of small, active, often colorful, freshwater ray-finned fishes, in the gourami family (Osphronemidae). The best known Betta species is B. splendens, commonly known as the Siamese fighting fish and often kept as an aquarium pet.

== Characteristics ==
All Betta species are small fishes, but they vary considerably in size, ranging from under 2.5 cm (1 in) total length in B. chanoides to 14 cm (5.5 in) in the Akar betta (B. akarensis).

Bettas are anabantoids, which means they can breathe atmospheric air using a unique organ called the labyrinth. This accounts for their ability to thrive in low-oxygen water conditions that would kill most other fish, such as rice paddies, slow-moving streams, drainage ditches, and large puddles.

The bettas exhibit two kinds of spawning behaviour: some build bubble nests, such as B. splendens, while others are mouthbrooders, such as B. picta. The mouthbrooding species are sometimes called "pseudo bettas", and are sometimes speculated to have evolved from the nest-builders in an adaptation to their fast-moving stream habitats.

A phylogenetic study published in 2004 concluded tentatively that bubble-nesting was the ancestral condition in Betta, and that mouthbrooding has evolved on more than one occasion in the history of the genus. However, it was unable to establish a correlation with any of three habitat variables studied: whether a species was found in lowland or highland streams, whether it was found in peat swamp forests, and whether it was found in water with fast or slow currents. Mouthbrooding species tend to exhibit less sexual dimorphism, perhaps because they do not need to defend a territory as the bubble-nesters do.

== Name ==
Siamese fighting fish (B. splendens) are frequently sold in the United States simply as "bettas". As of 2017, around 73 species are classified within the genus Betta. A useful distinction is that, while the generic name Betta is italicized and capitalized, when used as a common name it is usually neither italicized nor capitalized.The common name of B. pugnax, for example, is thus Penang betta.

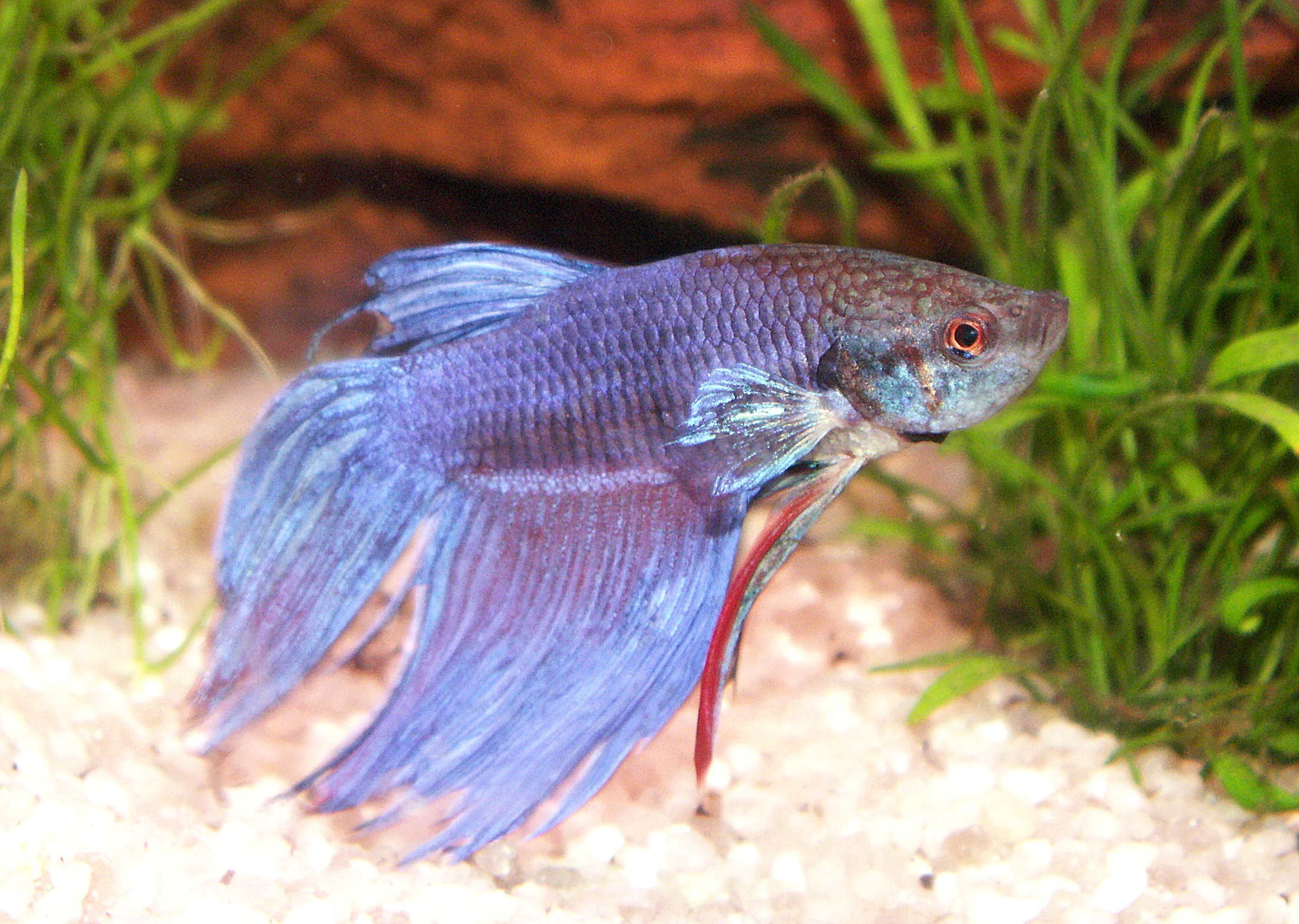
Betta splendens, the Siamese fighting fish, is often referred to simply as a "betta" in the U.S.

The name Betta (or betta) is pronounced /ˈbɛtə/; the first part is the same as the English word bet. The name is often pronounced /ˈbeɪtə/ in American English, and may be spelled with one 't'. The name of the genus is derived from the Malay term ikan betah ("persistent fish").

The vernacular name "plakat", often applied to the short-finned ornamental strains, derived from pla kad which means "fighting fish", is the Thai name for all members of the B. splendens species complex (All have aggressive tendencies in the wild and all are extensively line-bred for aggression in eastern Thailand). The Thai phrase is not restricted to one specific strain. The term "fighting fish" is generalized to all members of the B. splendens species complex, including the Siamese fighting fish.

== Diet ==
Wild Betta fish are hardy and eat almost any animal small enough to consume. This includes worms, larvae of mosquitoes or other insects, and smaller fish. Their natural environment is often resource-limited, so many Betta species are generalist feeders.

== Bettas as pets ==
Bettas are commonly kept as pet fish, especially Siamese fighting fish. Bettas are popular fish due to their color variety and ease to care for, although the males must be kept separated from other bettas.

== Conservation ==
While many Betta species are common and B. splendens is ubiquitous in the aquarium trade, other bettas are threatened. The IUCN Red List classifies several Betta species as Vulnerable. In addition, B. livida is Endangered, and B. miniopinna, B. persephone, and B. spilotogena are Critically Endangered.

The United Nations Environment Programme lists an unconfirmed species, Betta cf. tomi, as having become extinct in Singapore between 1970 and 1994. This likely refers to the extirpated Singaporean population of B. tomi, which continues to exist in the wild in Indonesia and Malaysia, as well as in captivity; the Red List classifies it as Vulnerable.

== Species ==
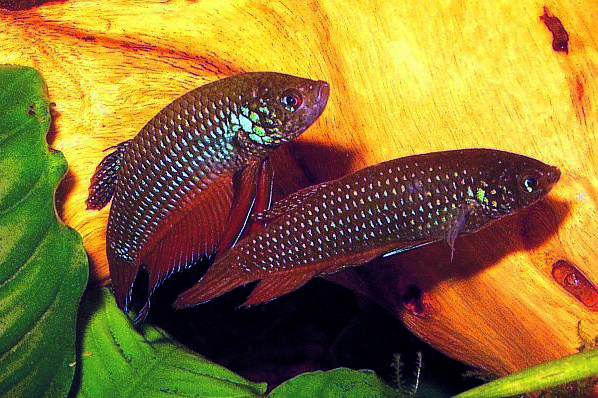
A pair of Betta smaragdina

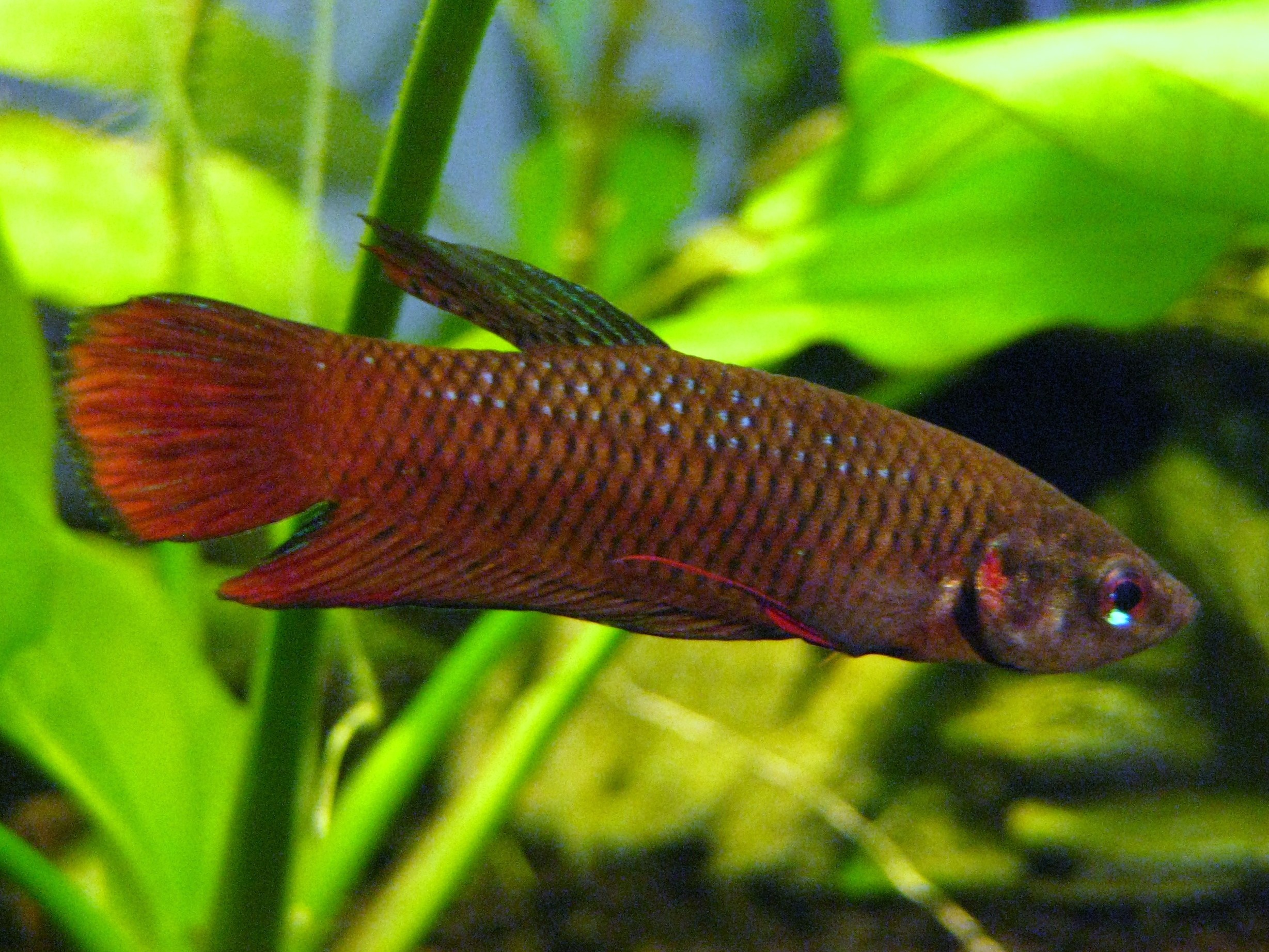
Male Betta tussyae

There are currently 78 recognized species in this genus. The currently described Betta species can be grouped into species complexes:

- B. akarensis complex:
  - Betta akarensis Regan, 1910 (Akar betta)
  - Betta antoni H. H. Tan & P. K. L. Ng, 2006
  - Betta aurigans H. H. Tan & K. K. P. Lim, 2004
  - Betta balunga Herre, 1940
  - Betta chini P. K. L. Ng, 1993
  - Betta ibanorum H. H. Tan & P. K. L. Ng, 2004
  - Betta nuluhon N. S. S. Kamal, H. H. Tan & Casey K. C. Ng, 2020
  - Betta obscura H. H. Tan & P. K. L. Ng, 2005
  - Betta pinguis H. H. Tan & Kottelat, 1998
- B. albimarginata complex:
  - Betta albimarginata Kottelat & P. K. L. Ng, 1994
  - Betta channoides Kottelat & P. K. L. Ng, 1994
- B. anabatoides complex:
  - Betta anabatoides Bleeker, 1851 (giant betta)
  - Betta midas H. H. Tan, 2009
- B. bellica complex:
  - Betta bellica Sauvage, 1884 (slim betta)
  - Betta simorum H. H. Tan & P. K. L. Ng, 1996
- B. coccina complex:
  - Betta brownorum K. E. Witte & J. Schmidt, 1992 (brown's betta)
  - Betta burdigala Kottelat & P. K. L. Ng, 1994
  - Betta coccina Vierke, 1979
  - Betta hendra I. Schindler & Linke, 2013
  - Betta iaspis Ding, Lei, Haryono, Shi, & Zhang, 2025
  - Betta livida P. K. L. Ng & Kottelat, 1992
  - Betta miniopinna H. H. Tan & S. H. Tan, 1994
  - Betta mulyadii Ding, Lei, Haryono, Shi, & Zhang, 2025
  - Betta persephone Schaller, 1986
  - Betta rutilans K. E. Witte & Kottelat, 1991
  - Betta tussyae Schaller, 1985
  - Betta uberis H. H. Tan & P. K. L. Ng, 2006
- B. dimidiata complex:
  - Betta dimidiata T. R. Roberts, 1989
  - Betta krataios H. H. Tan & P. K. L. Ng, 2006
- B. edithae complex:
  - Betta edithae Vierke, 1984
- B. foerschi complex:
  - Betta dennisyongi H. H. Tan, 2013
  - Betta foerschi Vierke, 1979
  - Betta mandor H. H. Tan & P. K. L. Ng, 2006
  - Betta rubra Perugia, 1893 (Toba betta)
  - Betta strohi Schaller & Kottelat, 1989
- B. picta complex:
  - Betta falx H. H. Tan & Kottelat, 1998
  - Betta picta (Valenciennes, 1846) (spotted betta)
  - Betta simplex Kottelat, 1994
  - Betta taeniata Regan, 1910 (Borneo betta)
- B. pugnax complex:
  - Betta apollon I. Schindler & J. Schmidt, 2006
  - Betta breviobesa H. H. Tan & Kottelat, 1998
  - Betta cracens H. H. Tan & P. K. L. Ng, 2005
  - Betta enisae Kottelat, 1995
  - Betta ferox I. Schindler & J. Schmidt, 2006
  - Betta fusca Regan, 1910 (dusky betta)
  - Betta kuehnei I. Schindler & J. Schmidt, 2008
  - Betta lehi H. H. Tan & P. K. L. Ng, 2005
  - Betta pallida I. Schindler & J. Schmidt, 2004
  - Betta prima Kottelat, 1994
  - Betta pugnax (Cantor, 1849) (Penang betta)
  - Betta pulchra H. H. Tan & S. H. Tan, 1996
  - Betta raja H. H. Tan & P. K. L. Ng, 2005
  - Betta schalleri Kottelat & P. K. L. Ng, 1994
  - Betta stigmosa H. H. Tan & P. K. L. Ng, 2005
- B. splendens complex (fighting fish):
  - Betta imbellis Ladiges, 1975 (crescent betta)
  - Betta mahachaiensis Kowasupat, Panijpan, Ruenwongsa & Sriwattanarothai, 2012
  - Betta siamorientalis Kowasupat, Panijpan, Ruenwongsa & Jeenthong, 2012
  - Betta smaragdina Ladiges, 1972 (Blue betta)
  - Betta splendens Regan, 1910 (Siamese fighting fish)
  - Betta stiktos H. H. Tan & P. K. L. Ng, 2005
- B. unimaculata complex:
  - Betta compuncta H. H. Tan & P. K. L. Ng, 2006
  - Betta gladiator H. H. Tan & P. K. L. Ng, 2005
  - Betta ideii H. H. Tan & P. K. L. Ng, 2006
  - Betta macrostoma Regan, 1910 (spotfin betta)
  - Betta ocellata de Beaufort, 1933
  - Betta pallifina H. H. Tan & P. K. L. Ng, 2005
  - Betta patoti M. C. W. Weber & de Beaufort, 1922
  - Betta unimaculata (Popta, 1905) (Howong betta)
- B. waseri complex:
  - Betta andrei H. H. Tan, 2023
  - Betta chloropharynx Kottelat & P. K. L. Ng, 1994
  - Betta hipposideros P. K. L. Ng & Kottelat, 1994
  - Betta omega H. H. Tan & Ahmad, 2018
  - Betta pardalotos H. H. Tan, 2009
  - Betta pi H. H. Tan, 1998
  - Betta renata H. H. Tan, 1998
  - Betta spilotogena P. K. L. Ng & Kottelat, 1994
  - Betta tomi P. K. L. Ng & Kottelat, 1994
  - Betta waseri Krummenacher, 1986
