= Betta prima =

Conservation status
- Least Concern (IUCN 3.1)

Scientific classification
- Kingdom: Animalia
- Phylum: Chordata
- Class: Actinopterygii
- Order: Anabantiformes
- Family: Osphronemidae
- Genus: Betta
- Species: B. prima

Binomial name
- Betta prima Kottelat, 1994

Species of fish

Betta prima is a species of gourami. It is native to Asia, where it occurs in southeastern Thailand, Laos and Vietnam. It is typically found among plants in marshes and slow-flowing streams. The water that the species occurs in is typically clear, with a pH of 6.6, a conductivity of 180 μS/cm, and a temperature of 25.8 °C (78.4 °F). The species reaches 5 cm (2 inches) in standard length and is known to be a facultative air-breather.
