= Betta ocellata =

Conservation status
- Least Concern (IUCN 3.1)

Scientific classification
- Kingdom: Animalia
- Phylum: Chordata
- Class: Actinopterygii
- Order: Anabantiformes
- Family: Osphronemidae
- Genus: Betta
- Species: B. ocellata

Binomial name
- Betta ocellata de Beaufort, 1933

Species of fish

Betta ocellata, sometimes known as the eyespot mouthbrooder, is a species of gourami. It is native to Asia, where it occurs in north-eastern Borneo, specifically Sabah and East Kalimantan, in the countries of Malaysia and Indonesia respectively. It is typically found in slow-flowing areas such as ravines and isolated pools in the vicinity of floating leaves and submerged leaf litter. Individuals of the species are excellent jumpers, feeding primarily on terrestrial insects, although aquatic invertebrates are also consumed. The species reaches 8 cm (3.1 in) in standard length and is known to be a facultative air-breather.
