= Betta chloropharynx =

Conservation status
- Critically Endangered (IUCN 3.1)

Scientific classification
- Kingdom: Animalia
- Phylum: Chordata
- Class: Actinopterygii
- Order: Anabantiformes
- Family: Osphronemidae
- Genus: Betta
- Species: B. chloropharynx

Binomial name
- Betta chloropharynx Kottelat & P. K. L. Ng, 1994

Species of fish

Betta chloropharynx or the green-throated mouthbrooding betta is a species of gourami endemic to Bangka Island, Indonesia. It inhabits the leaf litter in a single pool in a secondary forest. This species grows to a length of 5.9 cm (2.3 in).
