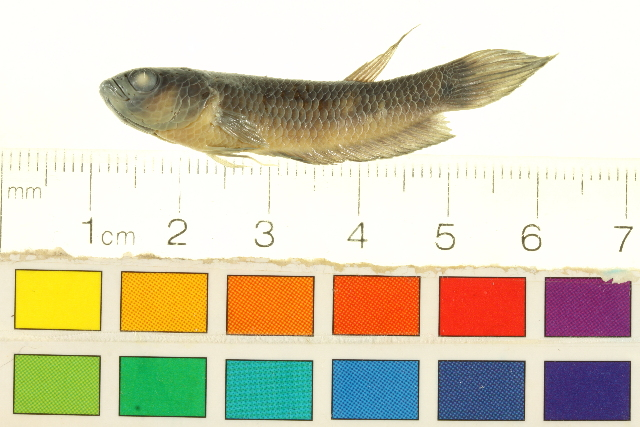

Conservation status
- Data Deficient (IUCN 3.1)

Scientific classification
- Kingdom: Animalia
- Phylum: Chordata
- Class: Actinopterygii
- Order: Anabantiformes
- Family: Osphronemidae
- Genus: Betta
- Species: B. compuncta

Binomial name
- Betta compuncta Tan & Ng, 2006

= Betta compuncta =

Species of ray-finned fish

Betta compuncta is a species of ray-finned fish in the family Osphronemidae. It reaches 6.2 cm (2.4 inches) in standard length.

Betta compuncta is a freshwater fish that occurs in small, slow-flowing streams in swampy areas, although it can also be found in fast-flowing streams. The species is known from East Kalimantan on the island of Borneo in Indonesia.

Betta compuncta reproduces sexually and is a paternal mouthbrooder, with males of the species incubating eggs for about 12 to 18 days, although incubation time can vary with water temperature.

Male individuals of Betta compuncta tend to have broader heads than females. The ovaries of female individuals can be seen under a spotlight.
