= Betta hipposideros =

Conservation status
- Endangered (IUCN 3.1)

Scientific classification
- Kingdom: Animalia
- Phylum: Chordata
- Class: Actinopterygii
- Order: Anabantiformes
- Family: Osphronemidae
- Genus: Betta
- Species: B. hipposideros

Binomial name
- Betta hipposideros P. K. L. Ng & Kottelat, 1994

Species of fish

Betta hipposideros is a species of gourami native to Malaysia; its range extends southwards to the Riau Archipelago. It is an inhabitant of blackwater swamps. This species grows to a length of 7.8 cm (3.1 in).
