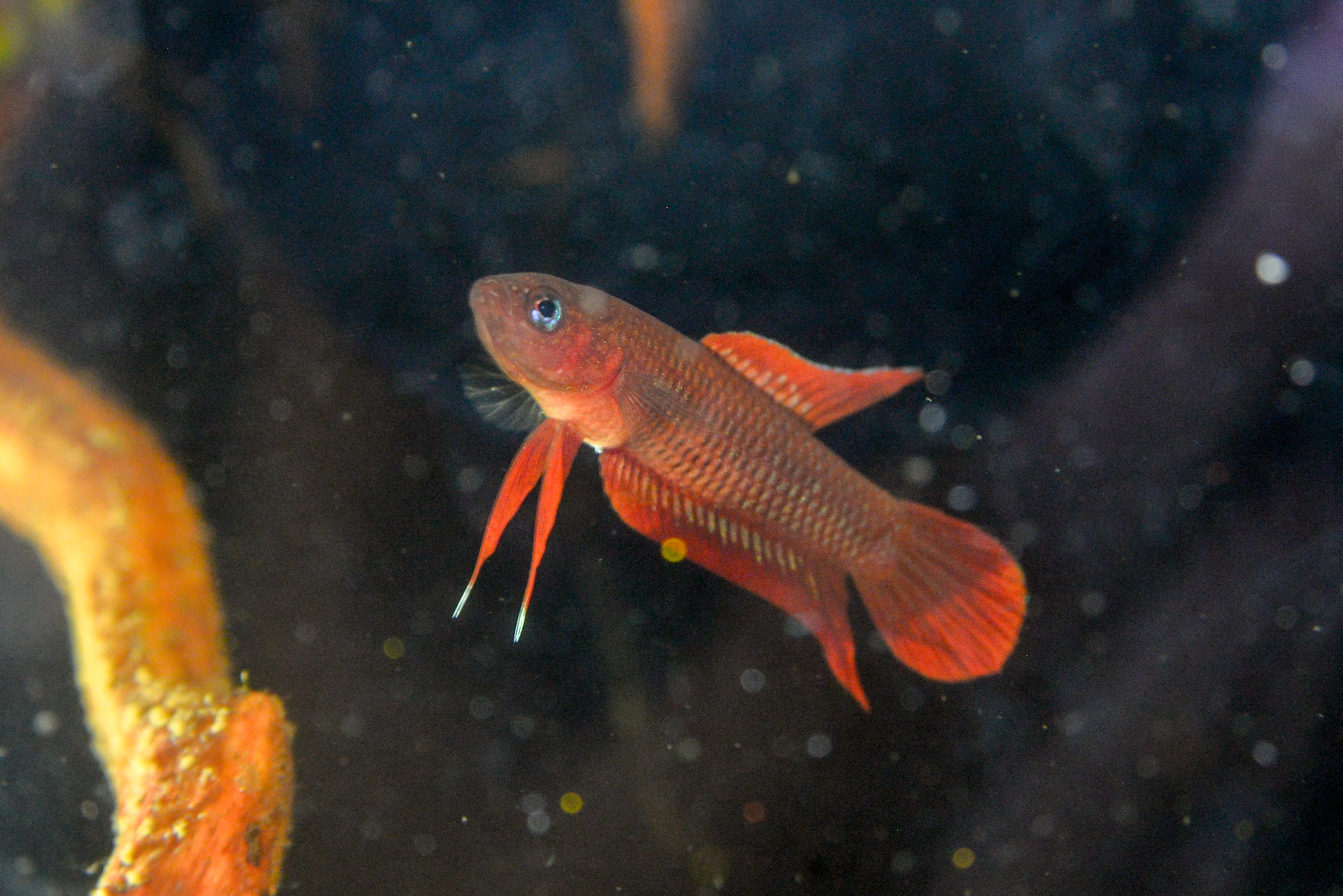

Conservation status
- Critically Endangered (IUCN 3.1)

Scientific classification
- Kingdom: Animalia
- Phylum: Chordata
- Class: Actinopterygii
- Order: Anabantiformes
- Family: Osphronemidae
- Genus: Betta
- Species: B. burdigala

Binomial name
- Betta burdigala Kottelat & P. K. L. Ng, 1994

= Betta burdigala =

Species of fish

Betta burdigala is a species of gourami endemic to Bangka Island in Indonesia. It is an inhabitant of peat swamps. This species grows to a length of 2.5 cm (0.98 in).
