= Betta renata =

Conservation status
- Vulnerable (IUCN 3.1)

Scientific classification
- Kingdom: Animalia
- Phylum: Chordata
- Class: Actinopterygii
- Order: Anabantiformes
- Family: Osphronemidae
- Genus: Betta
- Species: B. renata

Binomial name
- Betta renata Tan, 1998

Species of fish

Betta renata is a species of gourami. It is native to Asia, where it occurs in blackwater rivers in the vicinity of peat swamp forests on the island of Sumatra in Indonesia. The environments in which the species occurs are characterized by acidic water with a pH of 4.1, as well as abundant plant debris and logs. The species reaches 8.5 cm (3.3 inches) in standard length and is known to be a facultative air-breather.
