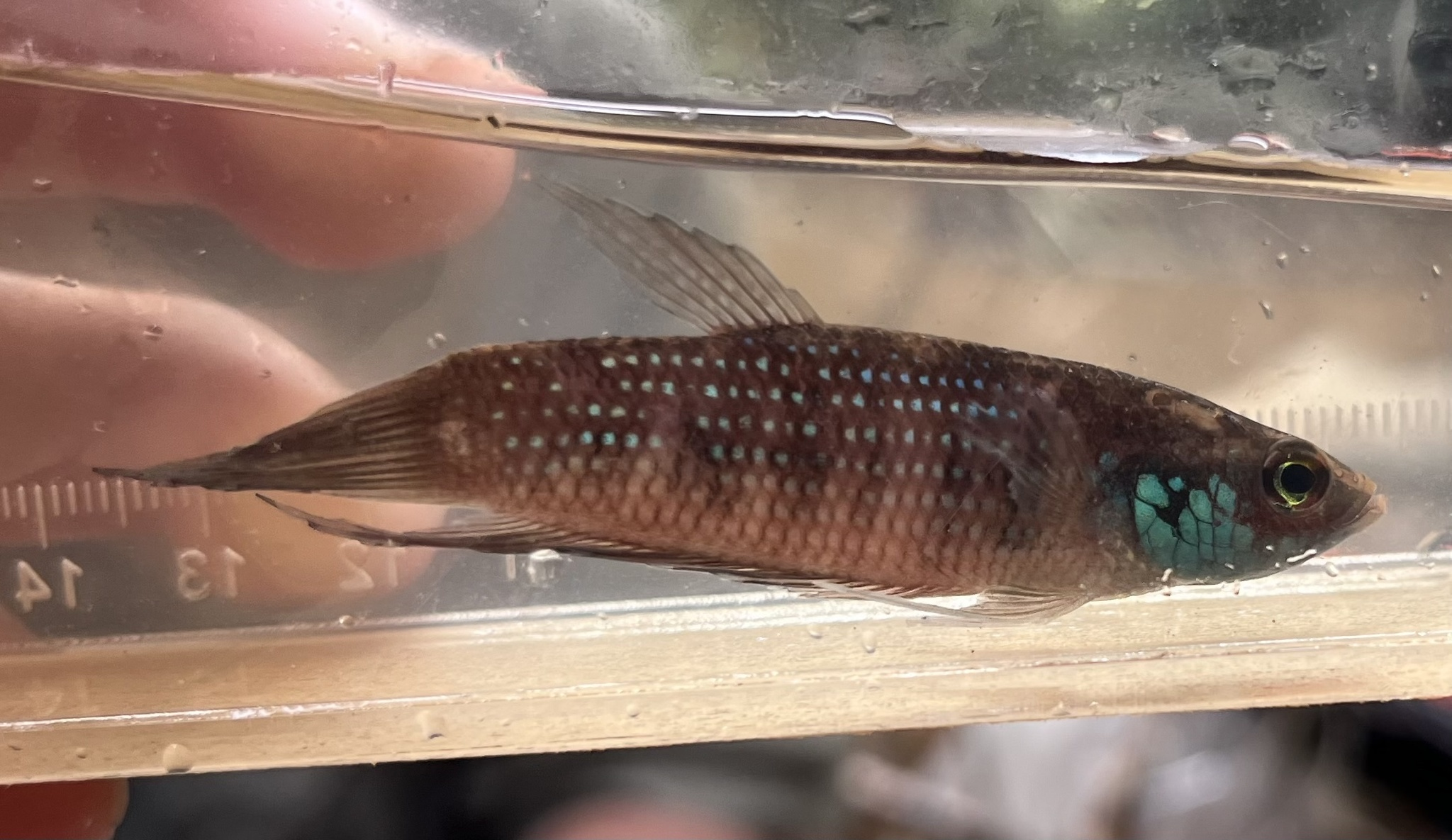

Conservation status
- Data Deficient (IUCN 3.1)

Scientific classification
- Kingdom: Animalia
- Phylum: Chordata
- Class: Actinopterygii
- Division: Teleostei
- Order: Anabantiformes
- Family: Osphronemidae
- Genus: Betta
- Species: B. stigmosa

Binomial name
- Betta stigmosa Tan & Ng, 2005

= Betta stigmosa =

Species of fish

Betta stigmosa is a species of gourami. It is a freshwater fish native to Asia, where it occurs only in the state of Terengganu in Malaysia. It is typically found in hillstreams. The species reaches 4.1 cm (1.6 inches) in standard length and is known to be a facultative air-breather.
