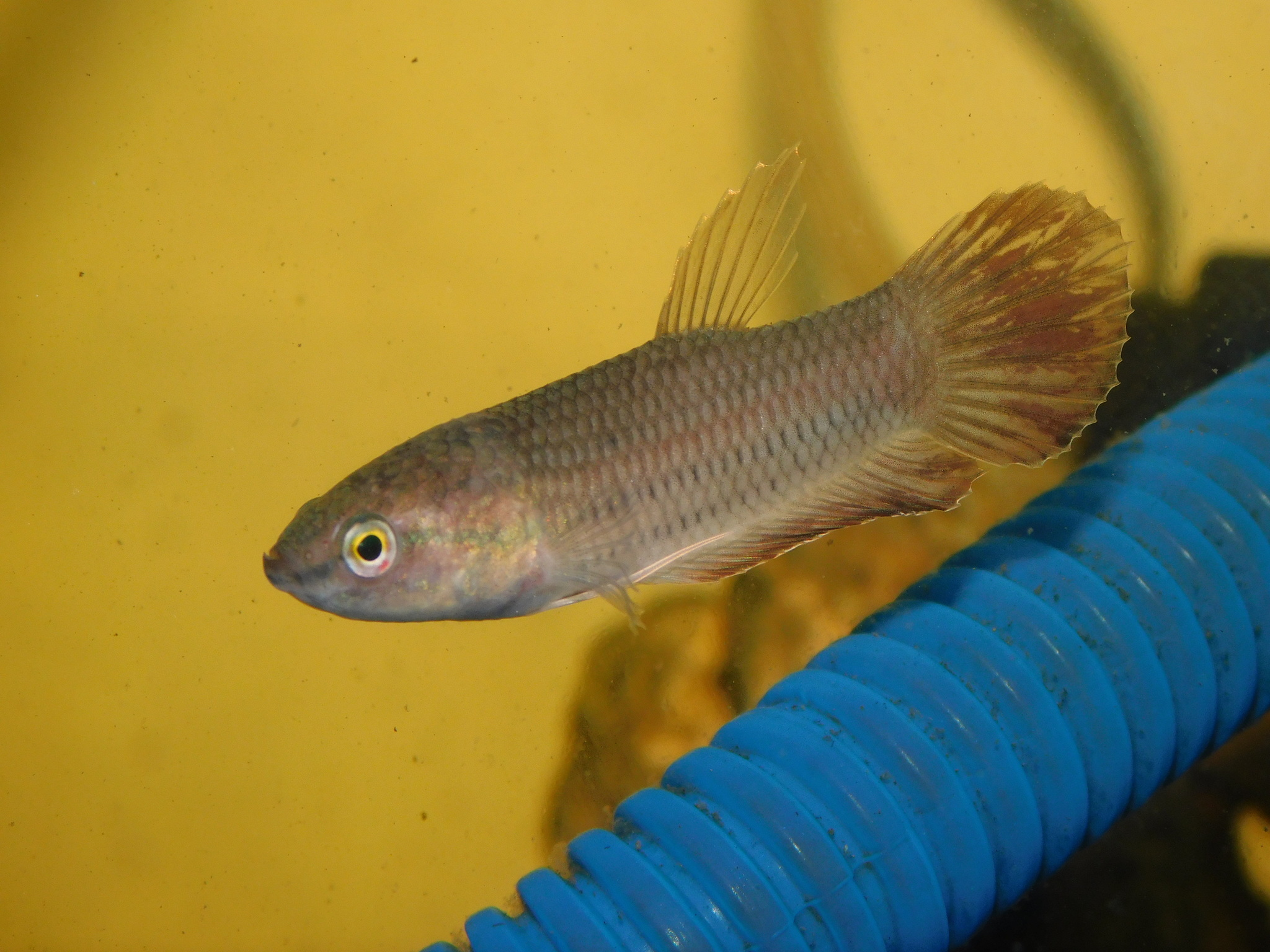

Conservation status
- Near Threatened (IUCN 3.1)

Scientific classification
- Kingdom: Animalia
- Phylum: Chordata
- Class: Actinopterygii
- Order: Anabantiformes
- Family: Osphronemidae
- Genus: Betta
- Species: B. picta

Binomial name
- Betta picta (Valenciennes, 1846)

Synonyms
- Panchax pictum Valenciennes, 1846; Betta trifasciata Bleeker, 1850

= Spotted betta =

Species of fish

The spotted betta or Java fighting fish (Betta picta) is a species of gourami endemic to Indonesia where it inhabits relatively cool, 22‒25 °C (72‒75 °F), highland streams of Java. In 1967, D. S. Johnson reported the species to be common in blackwaters of southern Malaya.

Of largely unremarkable Betta appearance, B. picta attains an overall length of 6 cm (2.4 in). It is noted for the pale bars on the male's back, absent in other similar Betta species.

Mouthbrooders, spotted bettas spawn en masse when triggered by water changes; this is likely to be an adaptation to reduce the chances, by saturating the environment with young, of individual fry falling prey to predators. This betta spawns readily and prolifically in captivity, producing easily raised fry. Even though it is easily kept and bred, it is not one of the more popular Betta species among hobbyists, likely because, in the words of one B. picta keeper, "many just can not get excited by watching a drab colored fish that spends most of its time hiding away under the rocks and behind the plants."

Originally described by Valenciennes and assigned to genus Panchax (as P. pictum). It was found that Bleeker's Betta trifasciata, described in 1850 and used as the type species of his genus Betta, was identical to P. pictum. As the original type specimens are now lost, H. H. Tan and Kottelat redescribed the species in 1998.
