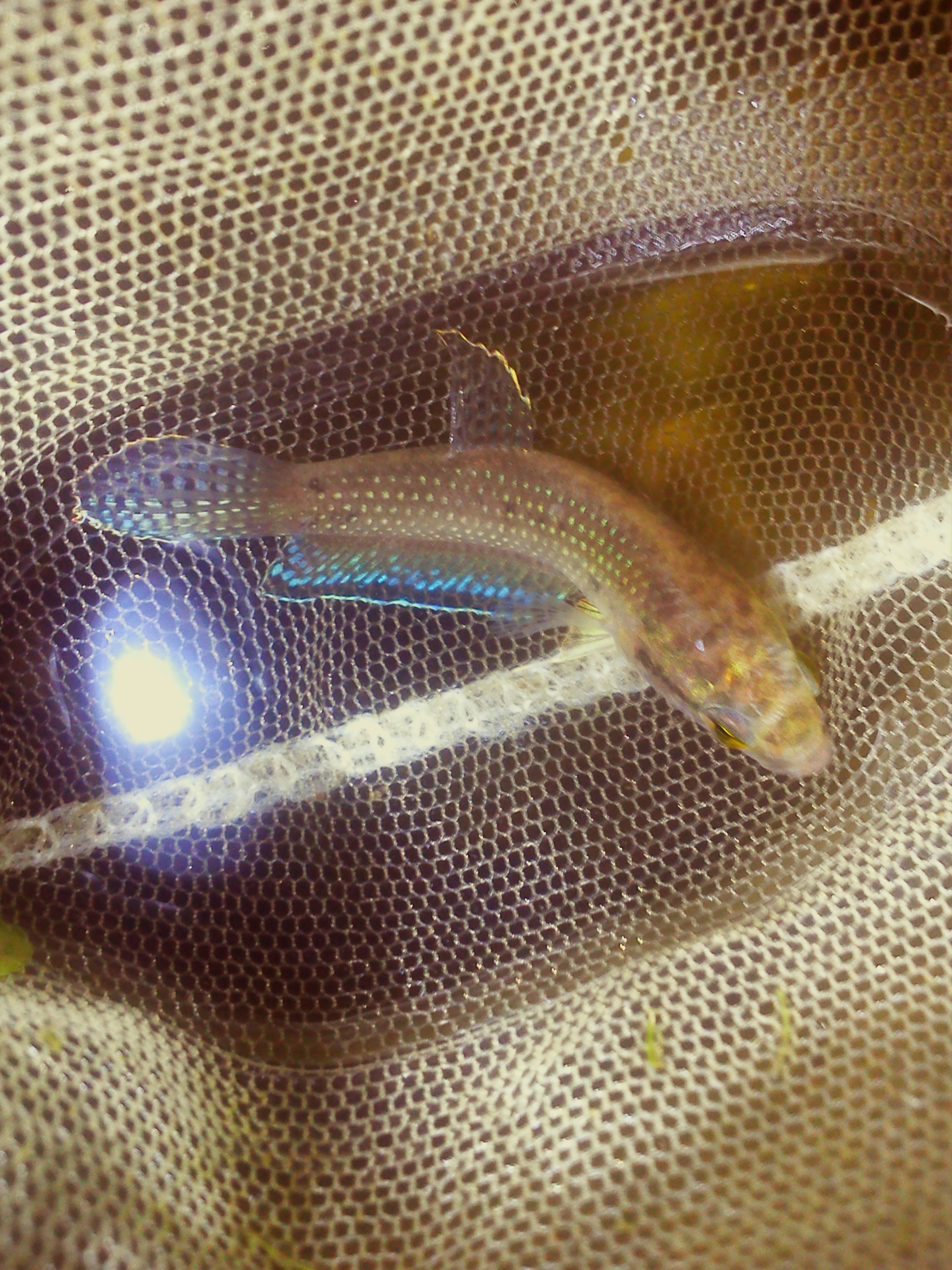

Conservation status
- Least Concern (IUCN 3.1)

Scientific classification
- Kingdom: Animalia
- Phylum: Chordata
- Class: Actinopterygii
- Order: Anabantiformes
- Family: Osphronemidae
- Genus: Betta
- Species: B. falx

Binomial name
- Betta falx H. H. Tan & Kottelat, 1998

= Betta falx =

Species of fish

Betta falx is a species of betta endemic to the island of Sumatra in Indonesia. It is an inhabitant of acidic, nearly stagnant water, where it can be found amongst the vegetation along the banks. This species grows to a length of 3.5 cm (1.4 in).
