= Betta cracens =

Conservation status
- Critically Endangered (IUCN 3.1)

Scientific classification
- Kingdom: Animalia
- Phylum: Chordata
- Class: Actinopterygii
- Order: Anabantiformes
- Family: Osphronemidae
- Genus: Betta
- Species: B. cracens

Binomial name
- Betta cracens H. H. Tan & P. K. L. Ng, 2005

Species of fish

Betta cracens is a species of gourami endemic to the island of Sumatra in Indonesia. It is an inhabitant of freshwater swamp forest. This species grows to a length of 5.7 cm (2.2 in), typically inhabits blackwaters that have very soft and very acidic water and is a bubble nest brooder. The Latin term cracens means "slender" or "elegant" and is so named because of the fish's slender body. It was first described in 1996 by Heok Hui Tan and Peter K. L. Ng in The Raffles Bulletin of Zoology.

The Betta Cracens have a Labyrinth Organ, a morpho-physiological adaptation that allows them to respirate in air. The Labyrinth Organ is a folded suprabranchial accessory breathing organ and a defining characteristic of fish in the suborder Anabantoidei. It is formed by vascularized expansion of the epibranchial bone of the first gill arch. This adaptation allows these fish to thrive in their harsh habitats.
