= Betta lehi =

Conservation status
- Vulnerable (IUCN 3.1)

Scientific classification
- Domain: Eukaryota
- Kingdom: Animalia
- Phylum: Chordata
- Class: Actinopterygii
- Order: Anabantiformes
- Family: Osphronemidae
- Genus: Betta
- Species: B. lehi

Binomial name
- Betta lehi Tan & Ng, 2005

Species of fish

Betta lehi is a species of gourami. It is native to Asia, where it occurs in the area southwest of Kuching in Sarawak in Malaysia, as well as the lower Kapuas River basin in West Kalimantan in Indonesia. It is typically found among vegetation in quiet streams in peat swamp forests and other acidic wetland environments. The species reaches 6.1 cm (2.4 inches) in standard length and is known to be a facultative air-breather.
