= Betta schalleri =

Conservation status
- Endangered (IUCN 3.1)

Scientific classification
- Kingdom: Animalia
- Phylum: Chordata
- Class: Actinopterygii
- Order: Anabantiformes
- Family: Osphronemidae
- Genus: Betta
- Species: B. schalleri

Binomial name
- Betta schalleri Kottelat & Ng, 1994

Species of fish

Betta schalleri, sometimes known as Schaller's mouthbrooder, is a species of gourami. It is a freshwater fish native to Asia, where it is known only from Bangka Island in Indonesia. It is typically found in hillstreams and peat swamp forests. The species reaches 4.5 cm (1.8 inches) in standard length and is known to be a facultative air-breather.
