= Betta pinguis =

Conservation status
- Critically Endangered (IUCN 3.1)

Scientific classification
- Kingdom: Animalia
- Phylum: Chordata
- Class: Actinopterygii
- Order: Anabantiformes
- Family: Osphronemidae
- Genus: Betta
- Species: B. pinguis

Binomial name
- Betta pinguis H. H. Tan & Kottelat, 1998

Species of fish

Betta pinguis is a species of gourami endemic to Indonesia. It is an inhabitant of forest streams. This species grows to a length of 7.9 centimetres (3.1 in) SL. This fish is used by local peoples as bait.
