= Betta waseri =

Conservation status
- Endangered (IUCN 3.1)

Scientific classification
- Kingdom: Animalia
- Phylum: Chordata
- Class: Actinopterygii
- Order: Anabantiformes
- Family: Osphronemidae
- Genus: Betta
- Species: B. waseri

Binomial name
- Betta waseri Krummenacher, 1986

Species of fish

Betta waseri is a species of gourami endemic to Peninsular Malaysia. It is an inhabitant of well shaded blackwater streams and in peat forests with plentiful organic debris and root growth. This species grows to a length of 9.8 centimetres (3.9 in) SL. The specific name honours the leader of the expedition on which the type of this species, the German aquarist Alfred Waser.
