= Betta spilotogena =

Conservation status
- Endangered (IUCN 3.1)

Scientific classification
- Kingdom: Animalia
- Phylum: Chordata
- Class: Actinopterygii
- Order: Anabantiformes
- Family: Osphronemidae
- Genus: Betta
- Species: B. spilotogena

Binomial name
- Betta spilotogena P. K. L. Ng & Kottelat, 1994

Species of fish

Betta spilotogena is a species of gourami endemic to Indonesia where it is only known from the islands of Bintan and Singkep. It inhabits swamps and nearby streams preferring areas with plentiful vegetation and 0.5 metres (1.6 ft) or less in depth. This species grows to a length of 7 centimetres (2.8 in) SL.
