= Betta hendra =

Conservation status
- Critically Endangered (IUCN 3.1)

Scientific classification
- Kingdom: Animalia
- Phylum: Chordata
- Class: Actinopterygii
- Order: Anabantiformes
- Family: Osphronemidae
- Genus: Betta
- Species: B. hendra

Binomial name
- Betta hendra I. Schindler & Linke, 2013

Species of fish

Betta hendra is a species of labyrinth fish native to Asia, endemic to the Sabangau River basin in Central Kalimantan of Borneo, Indonesia. It is typically found among plants in peat swamp forests, shaded by trees and bushes with a depth of 5 to 50 cm (2 to 19.7 inches) and no water current. The species typically reaches 4.2 cm (1.7 inches) in length and is known to be a facultative air-breather.

== Breeding ==
A captive breeding report in 2025 conducted by Priyadi et al. found the following information on Betta hendra breeding:

Conditioning adults for breeding consisted of daily live feedings for 30 days. Water temperature was kept between 28.0 - 28.6°C (82.5 - 83.5°F) and pH between 6.35 - 6.40. Males and females were kept separate at this time.

After the 30 day period, the fish can be paired up, and within ~2 days, Betta hendra males form bubble nests and spawn. Bubble nests are typically built under dried leaves or corners of the aquarium. After hatching, it takes ~4 days for the yolk sack to be fully absorbed, and for feeding to begin. Freshly hatched Artemia are a highly recommended food source. After around 3 weeks, fry become independent from their father.

Fry reared without males had a lower hatching rate with a higher survivability. Fry reared with males had a higher hatching rate with a lower survivability.
