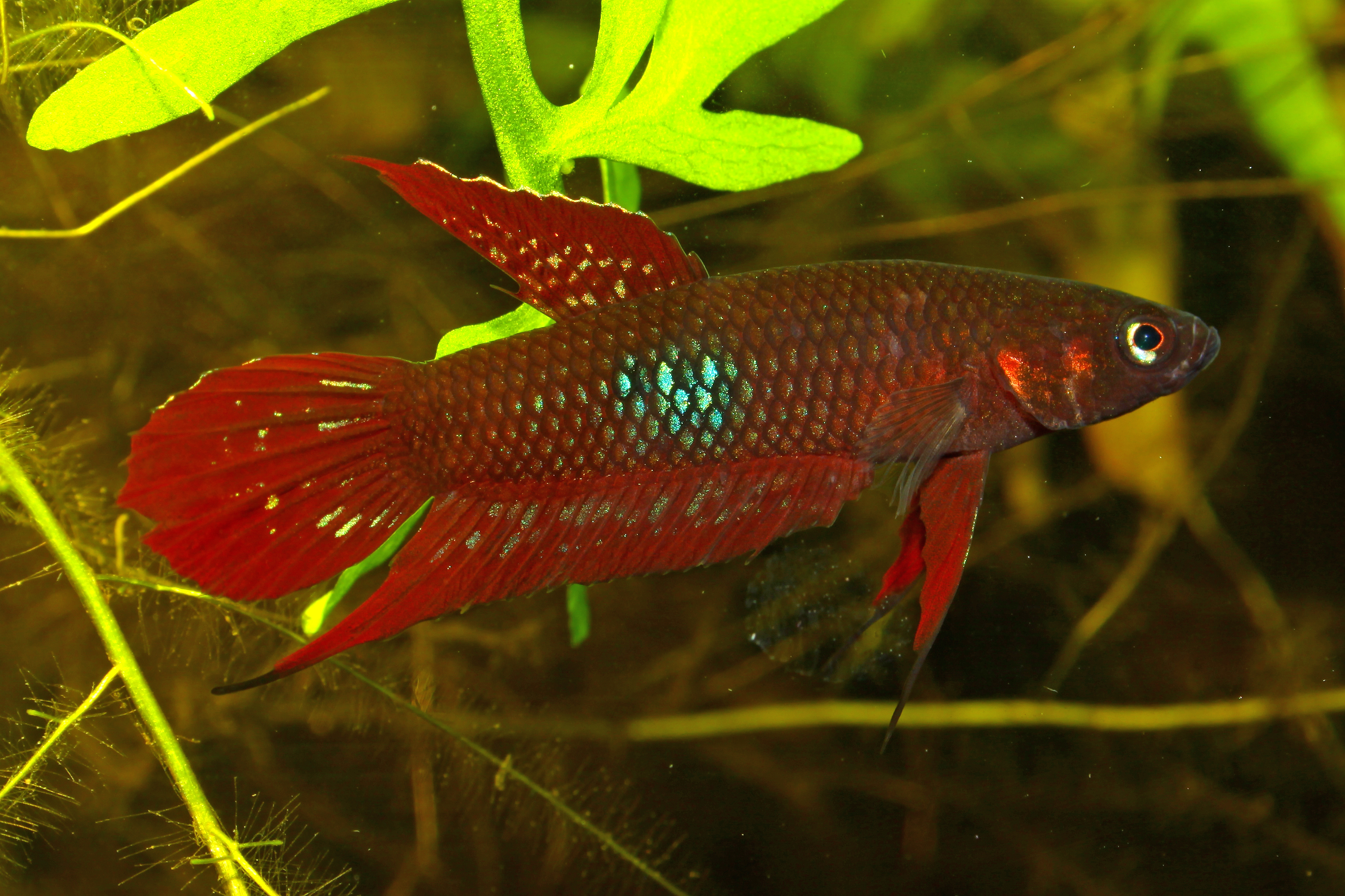

Conservation status
- Vulnerable (IUCN 3.1)

Scientific classification
- Kingdom: Animalia
- Phylum: Chordata
- Class: Actinopterygii
- Division: Teleostei
- Order: Anabantiformes
- Family: Osphronemidae
- Genus: Betta
- Species: B. coccina

Binomial name
- Betta coccina Vierke, 1979

= Betta coccina =

Species of fish

Betta coccina, commonly known as the wine red betta or red fighting fish, is a species of freshwater fish in the family Osphronemidae. It is endemic to the peat swamps of Indonesia and Malaysia, where it inhabits acidic, slow-moving waters. The species is known for its striking red coloration and relatively peaceful temperament compared to other Betta species.

== Taxonomy ==
Betta coccina was first described by Jörg Vierke in 1979. It belongs to the Betta genus, which comprises over 70 species known for their ability to breathe atmospheric oxygen through a labyrinth organ.

== Distribution & Habitat ==
Betta coccina is native to the peat swamp forests of Southeast Asia, particularly in Sumatra and the Malay Peninsula. These habitats are characterized by soft, acidic waters with a high concentration of humic substances,and is native to Peninsular Malaysia and Sumatra, Indonesia.

== Physical Description ==
It grows to a length of 5.6 cm (2.2 in). It can be found in the aquarium trade.Betta coccina exhibits a deep red coloration with iridescent scales and blue or green highlights on the fins. Males are typically more vibrant than females and possess longer fins. The average size of Betta coccina is around 5 cm (2 inches) in length.

== Behaviour ==
Unlike the well-known Betta splendens, Betta coccina is less aggressive and can be kept in small groups if provided with ample space and hiding spots. They exhibit bubble-nesting behavior, where males build floating nests out of bubbles for egg incubation.

== Diet ==
In the wild, Betta coccina feeds on small invertebrates, zooplankton, and insect larvae. In captivity, they accept a variety of foods, including live, frozen, and prepared diets designed for carnivorous fish.

== Breeding ==
Betta coccina can be bred in captivity with proper care. Breeding involves conditioning the fish with high-quality foods, followed by providing a suitable environment for the male to construct a bubble nest. Females lay eggs in the nest, and males guard and tend to the eggs until they hatch.

== Conservation status ==
Betta coccina is currently listed as Vulnerable on the IUCN Red List. Its natural habitats are under threat due to deforestation, pollution, and habitat conversion for agricultural use. Conservation efforts are needed to protect the remaining peat swamp forests and the biodiversity they support.
