= List of Indonesian endemic freshwater fishes =

Indonesia is a country with vast amount of freshwater fish species; it is the country with the third-largest number of freshwater fish species in the world, with a total of 1155 species. And about 440 species are endemic to Indonesia. This makes Indonesia as the 4th country with the largest endemic freshwater fish species, with Brazil (1716 species) in the 1st place, China (888) in the 2nd place and USA (593 species) in the 3rd place. (Dody94 2011)

Species name	Family	Vernacular name	Other name	Year found
Acrochordonichthys chamaeleon	Akysidae	N/A	N/A	N/A
Acrochordonichthys guttatus	Akysidae	N/A	N/A	N/A
Acrochordonichthys mahakamensis	Akysidae	N/A	N/A	N/A
Acrochordonichthys pleurostigma	Akysidae	N/A	N/A	N/A
Acrochordonichthys strigosus	Akysidae	N/A	N/A	N/A
Adrianichthys kruyti	Adrianichthyidae	Duckbilled Buntingi	N/A	N/A
Adrianichthys roseni	Adrianichthyidae	Rosen's Butingi	N/A	2004
Akysis fuscus	Akysidae	N/A	N/A	N/A
Akysis galeatus	Akysidae	N/A	N/A	2007
Akysis heterurus	Akysidae	N/A	N/A	N/A
Akysis macronemus	Akysidae	N/A	N/A	N/A
Akysis pseudobagarius	Akysidae	N/A	N/A	N/A
Akysis scorteus	Akysidae	N/A	N/A	2007
Allomogurnda sampricei	Eleotridae	N/A	N/A	2003
Arius goniaspis OC	Ariidae	Blacktip Sea Catfish	N/A	N/A
Arius macronotacanthus OC	Ariidae	N/A	N/A	N/A
Arius nudidens	Ariidae	N/A	N/A	N/A
Auriglobus amabilis	Tetraodontidae	N/A	N/A	N/A
Awaous personatus OC	Gobiidae	N/A	N/A	N/A
Bagrichthys micranodus	Bagridae	N/A	N/A	N/A
Bagrichthys vaillantii	Bagridae	N/A	N/A	N/A
Barbodes mahakkamensis	Cyprinidae	N/A	N/A	N/A
Barbodes platysoma	Cyprinidae	N/A	N/A	N/A
Barilius borneensis	Cyprinidae	N/A	N/A	N/A
Betta albimarginata	Osphronemidae	White-edged Betta	N/A	N/A
Betta antoni	Osphronemidae	N/A	N/A	2006
Betta aurigans	Osphronemidae	N/A	N/A	2004
Betta breviobesus	Osphronemidae	N/A	N/A	N/A
Betta burdigala	Osphronemidae	Red Brown Dwarf Fighter	N/A	N/A
Betta channoides	Osphronemidae	Snakehead Betta	N/A	N/A
Betta chloropharynx	Osphronemidae	Greenthroat Mouthbrooder	N/A	N/A
Betta coccina	Osphronemidae	Wine Red Betta	N/A	N/A
Betta compuncta	Osphronemidae	N/A	N/A	2006
Betta cracens	Osphronemidae	Clownface Betta	N/A	2005
Betta dimidiata	Osphronemidae	Dwarf Mouthbrooder	N/A	N/A
Betta edithae	Osphronemidae	Edith's Mouthbrooder	N/A	N/A
Betta enisae	Osphronemidae	Longfin Betta	N/A	N/A
Betta falx	Osphronemidae	Sumatra Betta	N/A	N/A
Betta foerschi	Osphronemidae	Foersch's Mouthbrooder	N/A	N/A
Betta ideii	Osphronemidae	Sakura Betta	N/A	2006
Betta krataios	Osphronemidae	Kapuas Betta	N/A	2006
Betta mandor	Osphronemidae	N/A	N/A	2006
Betta miniopinna	Osphronemidae	Smallfin Fighter	N/A	N/A
Betta obscura	Osphronemidae	N/A	N/A	2005
Betta pallifina	Osphronemidae	Barito Betta	N/A	2005
Betta patoti	Osphronemidae	Black Betta	N/A	N/A
Betta picta OC	Osphronemidae	Spotted Betta	N/A	N/A
Betta pinguis	Osphronemidae	N/A	N/A	N/A
Betta raja	Osphronemidae	Raja Betta	N/A	2005
Betta renata	Osphronemidae	N/A	N/A	N/A
Betta rubra	Osphronemidae	Toba Betta	N/A	N/A
Betta rutilans	Osphronemidae	Reddish Dwarf Fighter	N/A	N/A
Betta schalleri	Osphronemidae	Schaller's Mouthbrooder	N/A	N/A
Betta simorum	Osphronemidae	Simor Fighter	N/A	N/A
Betta spilotogena	Osphronemidae	Double Lipspot Mouthbrooder	N/A	N/A
Betta strohi	Osphronemidae	Father Stroh's Mouthbrooder	N/A	N/A
Betta uberis	Osphronemidae	N/A	N/A	2006
Boraras brigittae	Cyprinidae	Redfin Dwarf Rasbora	N/A	N/A
Boraras merah	Cyprinidae	N/A	N/A	N/A
Bostrichthys aruensis	Eleotridae	Island Gudgeon	N/A	N/A
Bostrychus microphthalmus	Eleotridae	N/A	N/A	2005
Botia macracanthus OC	Cobitidae	Clown Loach	N/A	N/A
Brachygobius xanthozona	Gobiidae	Bumblebee Goby	N/A	N/A
Breitensteinia cessator	Akysidae	N/A	N/A	N/A
Breitensteinia hypselurus	Akysidae	N/A	N/A	N/A
Breitensteinia insignis	Akysidae	N/A	N/A	N/A
Callogobius stellatus	Gobiidae	N/A	N/A	N/A
Carinotetraodon irrubesco	Tetraodontidae	Redtailed Redeye Puffer		
Channa cyanospilos	Channidae	Bluespotted Snakehead		
Channa melanoptera OC	Channidae	Blackfinned Snakehead		
Channa pleurophthalmus	Channidae	Ocellated Snakehead		
Chendol lubricus	Chaudhuriidae	N/A		
Chilatherina alleni	Melanotaeniidae	Allen's Rainbowfish		
Chilatherina bleheri	Melanotaeniidae	Bleher's Rainbowfish		
Chilatherina pricei	Melanotaeniidae	Price's Rainbowfish		
Chilatherina sentaniensis	Melanotaeniidae	Sentani Rainbowfish		
Chitala hypselonotus	Notopteridae	N/A		
Clarias insolitus	Clariidae	N/A	N/A	2003
Clarias intermedius	Clariidae	N/A		
Clarias kapuasensis	Clariidae	N/A		
Clarias leiacanthus OC	Clariidae	N/A		
Clarias microstomus	Clariidae	N/A		
Clarias nigricans	Clariidae	N/A	N/A	2003
Clarias olivaceus	Clariidae	N/A		
Clarias pseudoleiacanthus	Clariidae	N/A		
Clarias pseudonieuhofii	Clariidae	N/A	N/A	2004
Clupeichthys bleekeri	Clupeidae	Kapuas River Sprat		
Clupeoides hypselosoma	Clupeidae	Kalimantan River Sprat		
Craterocephalus fistularis	Atherinidae	Lake Triton Hardyhead		
Crossocheilus gnathopogon	Cyprinidae	N/A		
Cyclocheilichthys janthochir	Cyprinidae	Redfin River Barb		
Dermogenys ontana	Hemiramphidae	Mountain Halfbeak		
Dermogenys orientalis	Hemiramphidae	N/A		
Dermogenys sumatrana OC	Hemiramphidae	Sumatra Halfbeak		
Dermogenys vogti	Hemiramphidae	N/A		
Diplocheilichthys jentinkii	Cyprinidae	N/A		
Doryichthys heterosoma	Syngnathidae	N/A		
Eirmotus furvus	Cyprinidae	N/A	N/A	2008
Eirmotus insignis	Cyprinidae	N/A	N/A	2008
Eirmotus isthmus	Cyprinidae	N/A	N/A	2008
Eleotris brachyurus	Eleotridae	N/A		
Eleotris melanura	Eleotridae	N/A		
Eleotris pseudacanthopomus	Eleotridae	N/A		
Encheloclarias baculum	Clariidae	N/A		
Encheloclarias tapeinopterus	Clariidae	N/A		
Encheloclarias velatus	Clariidae	N/A		
Gastromyzon contractus	Balitoridae	N/A		
Gastromyzon embalohensis	Balitoridae	N/A		
Gastromyzon praestans	Balitoridae	N/A	N/A	2006
Gastromyzon psiloetron	Balitoridae	N/A	N/A	2006
Gastromyzon russulus	Balitoridae	N/A	N/A	2006
Gastromyzon zebrinus	Balitoridae	N/A	N/A	2006
Glossamia beauforti OC	Apogonidae	Beaufort's Mouth Almighty		
Glossamia heurni	Apogonidae	N/A		
Glossogobius flavipinnis	Gobiidae	N/A		
Glossogobius hoesei	Gobiidae	Hoese's Goby	N/A	N/A
Glossogobius intermedius	Gobiidae	N/A		
Glossogobius matanensis	Gobiidae	N/A		
Glossolepis dorityi	Melanotaeniidae	Grime Rainbowfish		
Glossolepis incisus OC	Melanotaeniidae	Salmon-red Rainbowfish		
Glossolepis leggetti	Melanotaeniidae	Leggett's Rainbowfish		
Glossolepis pseudoincisus	Melanotaeniidae	Tami River Rainbowfish		
Glyptothorax exodon	Sisoridae	N/A	N/A	2005
Glyptothorax nieuwenhuisi	Sisoridae	N/A		
Glyptothorax platypogon OC	Sisoridae	Brown Hillstream Catfish	N/A	N/A
Glyptothorax plectilis	Sisoridae	N/A	N/A	2008
Glyptothorax schmidti	Sisoridae	N/A		
Glyptothorax tiong	Sisoridae	N/A		
Gobius tigrellus	Gobiidae	Tiger Goby		
Gymnochanda flamea	Ambassidae	N/A		
Gymnochanda limi	Ambassidae	N/A		
Gyrinocheilus pustulosus	Gyrinocheilidae	N/A		
Helicophagus typus	Pangasiidae	N/A		
Hemibagrus bongan OC	Bagridae	N/A		
Hemibagrus caveatus	Bagridae	N/A		
Hemibagrus olyroides	Bagridae	N/A		
Hemibagrus velox	Bagridae	N/A		
Hemileiocassis panjang	Bagridae	N/A		
Hemirhamphodon chrysopunctatus	Hemiramphidae	Gold-spot Halfbeak		
Hemirhamphodon kapuasensis	Hemiramphidae	Red-striped Halfbeak		
Hemirhamphodon phaiosoma	Hemiramphidae	Long-finned Halfbeak		
Hemirhamphodon tengah	Hemiramphidae	Oviparous Halfbeak		
Hemisilurus moolenburghi	Siluridae	N/A		
Hephaestus lineatus	Terapontidae	Lined grunter		
Homaloptera gymnogaster	Balitoridae	N/A		
Homaloptera heterolepis	Balitoridae	N/A		
Homaloptera ocellata	Balitoridae	N/A		
Homaloptera ripleyi	Balitoridae	N/A		
Homaloptera vanderbilti	Balitoridae	N/A		
Homaloptera yuwonoi	Balitoridae	N/A		
Hyalobagrus flavus	Bagridae	Shadow Catfish		
Hyalobagrus leiacanthus	Bagridae	N/A		
Hypergastromyzon humilis	Balitoridae	N/A		
Ilisha pristigastroides OC	Pristigasteridae	N/A		
Kalimantania lawak	Cyprinidae	N/A		
Kalyptatherina helodes	Telmatherinidae	Marine Sailfin Silverside		
Kottelatlimia hipporhynchos	Cobitidae	N/A	N/A	2008
Kryptopterus lumholtzi	Siluridae	N/A		
Kryptopterus minor	Siluridae	Ghost Catfish		
Kryptopterus mononema	Siluridae	N/A		
Kryptopterus piperatus	Siluridae	N/A	N/A	2004
Labeo moszkowskii	Cyprinidae	N/A		
Labeo pietschmanni	Cyprinidae	N/A		
Labiobarbus lamellifer	Cyprinidae	N/A		
Lagusia micracanthus	Terapontidae	N/A		
Leiocassis aculeatus	Bagridae	N/A	N/A	2005
Leiocassis macropterus	Bagridae	N/A		
Leiocassis tenebricus	Bagridae	N/A	N/A	2006
Lentipes adelphizonus	Gobiidae	N/A	N/A	2006
Lentipes crittersius	Gobiidae	N/A		
Lentipes dimetrodon	Gobiidae	N/A		
Lentipes multiradiatus	Gobiidae	N/A		
Lentipes whittenorum	Gobiidae	N/A		
Lepidocephalichthys lorentzi	Cobitidae	N/A		
Lepidocephalus spectrum	Cobitidae	N/A		
Leptachirus lorentz	Soleidae	N/A	N/A	2007
Leptobarbus hoevenii	Cyprinidae	N/A		
Leptobarbus melanopterus	Cyprinidae	N/A		
Lobocheilos ixocheilos	Cyprinidae	N/A	N/A	2008
Lobocheilos lehat	Cyprinidae	N/A		
Lobocheilos schwanenfeldii OC	Cyprinidae	N/A		
Lobocheilos tenura	Cyprinidae	N/A	N/A	2008
Luciocephalus aura	Osphronemidae	N/A	N/A	2005
Marosatherina ladigesi OC	Telmatherinidae	Celebes Rainbowfish		
Melanotaenia ajamaruensis	Melanotaeniidae	Ajamaru Lakes Rainbowfish		
Melanotaenia ammeri	Melanotaeniidae	N/A	N/A	2008
Melanotaenia angfa	Melanotaeniidae	Yakati Rainbowfish	Angfa Rainbowfish	
Melanotaenia arfakensis	Melanotaeniidae	Arfak Rainbowfish		
Melanotaenia batanta	Melanotaeniidae	Batanta Rainbowfish		
Melanotaenia boesemani	Melanotaeniidae	Boeseman's Rainbowfish		
Melanotaenia catherinae	Melanotaeniidae	Waigeo Rainbowfish		
Melanotaenia corona	Melanotaeniidae	Corona Rainbowfish		
Melanotaenia fredericki	Melanotaeniidae	Sorong Rainbowfish		
Melanotaenia irianjaya	Melanotaeniidae	Irian Jaya Rainbowfish		
Melanotaenia japenensis	Melanotaeniidae	Japen Rainbowfish		
Melanotaenia kamaka	Melanotaeniidae	Kamaka Rainbowfish		
Melanotaenia kokasensis	Melanotaeniidae	N/A	N/A	2008
Melanotaenia lakamora	Melanotaeniidae	Lakamora Rainbowfish		
Melanotaenia maylandi	Melanotaeniidae	Mayland's Rainbowfish		
Melanotaenia misoolensis	Melanotaeniidae	Misool Rainbowfish		
Melanotaenia ogilbyi OC	Melanotaeniidae	Ogilby's Rainbowfish		
Melanotaenia parva	Melanotaeniidae	Lake Kurumoi Rainbowfish		
Melanotaenia pierucciae	Melanotaeniidae	Pierucci's Rainbowfish		
Melanotaenia praecox OC	Melanotaeniidae	Neon Rainbowfish		
Melanotaenia rubripinnis	Melanotaeniidae	Red-finned Rainbowfish		
Melanotaenia synergos	Melanotaeniidae	N/A	N/A	2008
Melanotaenia vanheurni	Melanotaeniidae	Van Heurn's Rainbowfish	N/A	N/A
Microphis caudocarinatus	Syngnathidae	Slender Pipefish	N/A	N/A
Mogurnda aiwasoensis	Eleotridae	N/A	N/A	N/A
Mogurnda kaifayama	Eleotridae	N/A	N/A	N/A
Mogurnda magna	Eleotridae	N/A	N/A	N/A
Mogurnda mbuta	Eleotridae	N/A	N/A	N/A
Mogurnda pardalis	Eleotridae	N/A	N/A	N/A
Mogurnda wapoga	Eleotridae	N/A	N/A	N/A
Mugilogobius adeia	Gobiidae	N/A	N/A	N/A
Mugilogobius amadi	Gobiidae	N/A	N/A	N/A
Mugilogobius karatunensis	Gobiidae	N/A	N/A	N/A
Mugilogobius latifrons	Gobiidae	N/A	N/A	N/A
Mugilogobius lepidotus	Gobiidae	N/A	N/A	N/A
Mugilogobius rexi	Gobiidae	N/A	N/A	N/A
Mugilogobius sarasinorum	Gobiidae	Sarasin's Goby	N/A	N/A
Mugilogobius zebra OC	Gobiidae	N/A	N/A	N/A
Mystacoleucus padangensis	Cyprinidae	N/A	N/A	N/A
Mystus abbreviatus	Bagridae	N/A	N/A	N/A
Mystus alasensis	Bagridae	N/A	N/A	2005
Mystus bimaculatus OC	Bagridae	N/A	N/A	
Mystus impluviatus	Bagridae	N/A	N/A	2003
Mystus punctifer	Bagridae	N/A	N/A	N/A
Nandus mercatus	Nandidae	N/A	N/A	2008
Nanobagrus armatus	Bagridae	N/A	N/A	N/A
Nanobagrus immaculatus	Bagridae	N/A	N/A	2008
Nanobagrus stellatus	Bagridae	N/A	N/A	N/A
Nanobagrus torquatus	Bagridae	N/A	N/A	2008
Nemacheilus chrysolaimos	Balitoridae	N/A	N/A	N/A
Nemacheilus lactogeneus	Balitoridae	N/A	N/A	N/A
Nemacheilus longipinnis	Balitoridae	N/A	N/A	N/A
Nemacheilus pfeifferae	Balitoridae	N/A	N/A	N/A
Nemacheilus tuberigum	Balitoridae	N/A	N/A	N/A
Neogastromyzon kottelati	Balitoridae	N/A	N/A	2006
Neolissochilus longipinnis	Cyprinidae	N/A	N/A	N/A
Neolissochilus sumatranus OC	Cyprinidae	Large-scaled Barb	N/A	N/A
Neolissochilus thienemanni	Cyprinidae	N/A	N/A	N/A
Neostethus djajaorum	Phallostethidae	N/A	N/A	N/A
Nomorhamphus australis	Hemiramphidae	Hooked Halfbeak	N/A	N/A
Nomorhamphus brembachi	Hemiramphidae	N/A	N/A	N/A
Nomorhamphus celebensis	Hemiramphidae	Northern Harlequin Halfbeak	N/A	N/A
Nomorhamphus ebrardtii	Hemiramphidae	Orange Finned Halfbeak	N/A	N/A
Nomorhamphus hageni	Hemiramphidae	N/A	N/A	N/A
Nomorhamphus kolonodalensis	Hemiramphidae	N/A	N/A	N/A
Nomorhamphus liemi	Hemiramphidae	Southern Harlequin Halfbeak	N/A	N/A
Nomorhamphus megarrhamphus	Hemiramphidae	N/A	N/A	N/A
Nomorhamphus ravnaki	Hemiramphidae	Turquoise Halfbeak	N/A	N/A
Nomorhamphus sanussii	Hemiramphidae	N/A	N/A	N/A
Nomorhamphus towoetii	Hemiramphidae	Towoeti Halfbeak	N/A	N/A
Nomorhamphus weberi	Hemiramphidae	N/A	N/A	N/A
Ompok binotatus	Siluridae	N/A	N/A	N/A
Ompok javanensis	Siluridae	N/A	N/A	N/A
Ompok miostoma	Siluridae	N/A	N/A	N/A
Ompok pluriradiatus	Siluridae	N/A	N/A	N/A
Ompok supernus	Siluridae	N/A	N/A	2008
Ompok weberi	Siluridae	N/A	N/A	N/A
Oryzias bonneorum	Adrianichthyidae	Bonnes’ Butingi	N/A	2008
Oryzias celebensis	Adrianichthyidae	Celebes Medaka	N/A	N/A
Oryzias hubbsi	Adrianichthyidae	Hubbs's Medaka	N/A	N/A
Oryzias marmoratus	Adrianichthyidae	Javanese Ricefish	N/A	N/A
Oryzias matanensis	Adrianichthyidae	Matano Medaka	N/A	N/A
Oryzias nebulosus	Adrianichthyidae	Nebulous Ricefish	N/A	2004
Oryzias nigrimas	Adrianichthyidae	Black Buntingi	N/A	N/A
Oryzias orthognathus	Adrianichthyidae	Sharpjawed Buntingi	N/A	N/A
Oryzias profundicola	Adrianichthyidae	Yellow-finned Medaka	N/A	N/A
Osteochilus bellus	Cyprinidae	N/A	N/A	N/A
Osteochilus bleekeri	Cyprinidae	N/A	N/A	2008
Osteochilus borneensis	Cyprinidae	N/A	N/A	N/A
Osteochilus intermedius	Cyprinidae	N/A	N/A	N/A
Osteochilus jeruk	Cyprinidae	N/A	N/A	N/A
Osteochilus kappenii	Cyprinidae	N/A	N/A	N/A
Osteochilus kelabau	Cyprinidae	N/A	N/A	N/A
Osteochilus kuekenthali	Cyprinidae	N/A	N/A	N/A
Osteochilus partilineatus	Cyprinidae	N/A	N/A	N/A
Osteochilus pentalineatus	Cyprinidae	N/A	N/A	N/A
Osteochilus pleurotaenia OC	Cyprinidae	N/A	N/A	N/A
Osteochilus repang	Cyprinidae	N/A	N/A	N/A
Osteochilus serokan	Cyprinidae	N/A	N/A	N/A
Oxyeleotris altipinna	Eleotridae	N/A	N/A	N/A
Oxyeleotris urophthalmoides OC	Eleotridae	N/A	N/A	N/A
Oxyeleotris wisselensis	Eleotridae	Paniai Gudgeon	N/A	N/A
Paedocypris carbunculus	Cyprinidae	N/A	N/A	2008
Paedocypris progenetica	Cyprinidae	N/A	N/A	2006
Pandaka rouxi	Gobiidae	N/A	N/A	N/A
Pangasius bedado	Pangasiidae	N/A	N/A	N/A
Pangasius humeralis	Pangasiidae	N/A	N/A	N/A
Pangasius lithostoma	Pangasiidae	N/A	N/A	N/A
Pangasius mahakamensis	Pangasiidae	N/A	N/A	N/A
Pangasius nieuwenhuisii	Pangasiidae	N/A	N/A	N/A
Pangasius rheophilus	Pangasiidae	N/A	N/A	N/A
Pangio alternans	Cobitidae	Borneo Kuhli Loach	N/A	N/A
Pangio pulla	Cobitidae	Red Giant Kuhli Loach	N/A	N/A
Pangio robiginosa	Cobitidae	N/A	N/A	N/A
Pangio superba	Cobitidae	N/A	N/A	N/A
Parachela cyanea	Cyprinidae	N/A	N/A	N/A
Parachela ingerkongi	Cyprinidae	N/A	N/A	N/A
Paradoxodacna piratica	Ambassidae	N/A	N/A	N/A
Parakysis anomalopteryx	Parakysidae	N/A	N/A	N/A
Parakysis notialis	Parakysidae	N/A	N/A	N/A
Parambassis altipinnis	Ambassidae	High-finned Glass Perchlet	N/A	N/A
Parambassis macrolepis	Ambassidae	N/A	N/A	N/A
Paratherina cyanea	Telmatherinidae	N/A	N/A	N/A
Paratherina labiosa	Telmatherinidae	N/A	N/A	N/A
Paratherina striata	Telmatherinidae	N/A	N/A	N/A
Paratherina wolterecki	Telmatherinidae	N/A	N/A	N/A
Parosphromenus anjunganensis	Osphronemidae	Anjungan Licorice Gourami	N/A	N/A
Parosphromenus bintan	Osphronemidae	Bintan Licorice Gourami	N/A	N/A
Parosphromenus deissneri OC	Osphronemidae	Licorice Gourami	N/A	N/A
Parosphromenus filamentosus	Osphronemidae	Spiketail Licorice Gourami	N/A	N/A
Parosphromenus linkei	Osphronemidae	Linke's Licorice Gourami	N/A	N/A
Parosphromenus opallios	Osphronemidae	N/A	N/A	2005
Parosphromenus ornaticauda	Osphronemidae	Redtail Licorice Gourami	N/A	N/A
Parosphromenus pahuensis	Osphronemidae	N/A	N/A	2005
Parosphromenus parvulus	Osphronemidae	Small Licorice Gourami	N/A	N/A
Parosphromenus quindecim	Osphronemidae	N/A	N/A	2005
Parosphromenus sumatranus	Osphronemidae	Fire Red Licorice Gourami	N/A	N/A
Pectenocypris balaena	Cyprinidae	N/A	N/A	N/A
Pectenocypris korthausae	Cyprinidae	Orange Doublespotted Rasbora	N/A	N/A
Pelangia mbutaensis	Melanotaeniidae	Lake Mbuta Rainbowfish	N/A	N/A
Pisodonophis hypselopterus	Ophichthidae	N/A	N/A	N/A
Polydactylus macrophthalmus	Polynemidae	River Threadfin	N/A	N/A
Polynemus kapuasensis	Polynemidae	N/A	N/A	2003
Poropuntius tawarensis	Cyprinidae	N/A	N/A	N/A
Pristolepis grootii OC	Nandidae	Indonesian Leaffish	N/A	N/A
Pseudeutropius brachypopterus	Schilbeidae	N/A	N/A	N/A
Pseudeutropius moolenburghae	Schilbeidae	N/A	N/A	N/A
Pseudobagarius meridionalis	Akysidae	N/A	N/A	2004
Pseudogobiopsis penango	Gobiidae	N/A	N/A	N/A
Pseudomugil ivantsoffi	Pseudomugilidae	N/A	N/A	N/A
Pseudomugil pellucidus	Pseudomugilidae	Transparent Blue-eye	N/A	N/A
Pseudomugil reticulatus	Pseudomugilidae	Vogelkop Blue-eye	N/A	N/A
Pseudomystus breviceps	Bagridae	N/A	N/A	N/A
Pseudomystus carnosus	Bagridae	N/A	N/A	2005
Pseudomystus flavipinnis	Bagridae	N/A	N/A	N/A
Pseudomystus heokhuii	Bagridae	N/A	N/A	2008
Pseudomystus mahakamensis	Bagridae	N/A	N/A	N/A
Pseudomystus moeschii	Bagridae	N/A	N/A	N/A
Pseudomystus myersi	Bagridae	N/A	N/A	N/A
Pseudomystus rugosus OC	Bagridae	N/A	N/A	N/A
Pseudomystus stenogrammus	Bagridae	N/A	N/A	2005
Pseudomystus vaillanti	Bagridae	N/A	N/A	N/A
Puntius anchisporus	Cyprinidae	N/A	N/A	N/A
Puntius aphya	Cyprinidae	N/A	N/A	N/A
Puntius bunau	Cyprinidae	N/A	N/A	2005
Puntius dorsimaculatus	Cyprinidae	Blackline Barb	N/A	N/A
Puntius endecanalis	Cyprinidae	N/A	N/A	N/A
Puntius foerschi	Cyprinidae	N/A	N/A	N/A
Puntius gemellus	Cyprinidae	N/A	N/A	N/A
Puntius microps	Cyprinidae	N/A	N/A	N/A
Puntius oligolepis IN	Cyprinidae	Checkered Barb	N/A	N/A
Puntius rhomboocellatus OC	Cyprinidae	Round-banded Barb	N/A	N/A
Puntius trifasciatus	Cyprinidae	N/A	N/A	N/A
Rasbora aprotaenia	Cyprinidae	N/A	N/A	N/A
Rasbora baliensis	Cyprinidae	N/A	N/A	N/A
Rasbora beauforti	Cyprinidae	Spotlight Rasbora	N/A	N/A
Rasbora borneensis	Cyprinidae	N/A	N/A	N/A
Rasbora bunguranensis OC	Cyprinidae	N/A	N/A	N/A
Rasbora dies	Cyprinidae	N/A	N/A	2008
Rasbora ennealepis	Cyprinidae	N/A	N/A	N/A
Rasbora jacobsoni	Cyprinidae	N/A	N/A	N/A
Rasbora johannae	Cyprinidae	N/A	N/A	N/A
Rasbora kalbarensis	Cyprinidae	Kalbar Rasbora	N/A	N/A
Rasbora laticlavia	Cyprinidae	N/A	N/A	N/A
Rasbora leptosoma	Cyprinidae	Copperstripe Rasbora	N/A	N/A
Rasbora reticulata	Cyprinidae	Reticulate Rasbora	N/A	N/A
Rasbora spilotaenia	Cyprinidae	N/A	N/A	N/A
Rasbora subtilis	Cyprinidae	N/A	N/A	N/A
Rasbora tawarensis	Cyprinidae	N/A	N/A	N/A
Rasbora tobana	Cyprinidae	N/A	N/A	N/A
Rasbora vulcanus	Cyprinidae	N/A	N/A	N/A
Redigobius amblyrhynchus	Gobiidae	N/A	N/A	N/A
Redigobius leptochilus	Gobiidae	N/A	N/A	N/A
Schismatorhynchos endecarhapis	Cyprinidae	N/A	N/A	N/A
Schismatorhynchos heterorhynchos OC	Cyprinidae	Dolphin Barb	N/A	N/A
Schistura maculiceps	Balitoridae	N/A	N/A	N/A
Scleropages aureus	Osteoglossidae	Gold Arowana	N/A	2003
Scleropages legendrei	Osteoglossidae	Red Arowana	N/A	2003
Scleropages macrocephalus	Osteoglossidae	Silver Asian Arowana	N/A	2003
Sicyopterus hageni	Gobiidae	Hagen's Goby	N/A	N/A
Sicyopterus parvei	Gobiidae	N/A	N/A	N/A
Sicyopus exallisquamulus	Gobiidae	N/A	N/A	2006
Sicyopus multisquamatus	Gobiidae	N/A	N/A	N/A
Sicyopus mystax	Gobiidae	N/A	N/A	N/A
Silurichthys citatus	Siluridae	N/A	N/A	N/A
Silurichthys gibbiceps	Siluridae	N/A	N/A	N/A
Silurichthys sanguineus	Siluridae	N/A	N/A	N/A
Sphaerichthys acrostoma	Osphronemidae	Large Chocolate Gourami	N/A	N/A
Sphaerichthys selatanensis	Osphronemidae	Selatan Chocolate Gourami	N/A	N/A
Sphaerichthys vaillanti	Osphronemidae	Vaillant's Chocolate Gourami	N/A	N/A
Stenogobius blokzeyli OC	Gobiidae	N/A	N/A	N/A
Stenogobius lachneri	Gobiidae	Bintuni Goby	N/A	N/A
Stenogobius zurstrassenii	Gobiidae	N/A	N/A	N/A
Stigmatogobius signifer	Gobiidae	N/A	N/A	2005
Stiphodon carisa	Gobiidae	N/A	N/A	2008
Stiphodon ornatus	Gobiidae	N/A	N/A	N/A
Stiphodon weberi	Gobiidae	N/A	N/A	N/A
Stiphodon zebrinus	Gobiidae	N/A	N/A	N/A
Sundadanio axelrodi	Cyprinidae	Axelrod's Fire Rasbora	N/A	N/A
Sundagagata robusta	Sisoridae	N/A	N/A	N/A
Sundasalanx malleti	Sundasalangidae	N/A	N/A	N/A
Sundasalanx megalops	Sundasalangidae	N/A	N/A	N/A
Sundasalanx mesops	Sundasalangidae	N/A	N/A	N/A
Sundasalanx microps OC	Sundasalangidae	N/A	N/A	N/A
Sundasalanx platyrhynchus	Sundasalangidae	N/A	N/A	N/A
Sundoreonectes obesus	Balitoridae	N/A	N/A	N/A
Telmatherina abendanoni	Telmatherinidae	Matano Celebes Rainbowfish	N/A	N/A
Telmatherina antoniae	Telmatherinidae	N/A	N/A	N/A
Telmatherina bonti	Telmatherinidae	Lake Towuti Rainbowfish	N/A	N/A
Telmatherina celebensis	Telmatherinidae	N/A	N/A	N/A
Telmatherina obscura	Telmatherinidae	N/A	N/A	N/A
Telmatherina opudi	Telmatherinidae	N/A	N/A	N/A
Telmatherina prognatha	Telmatherinidae	N/A	N/A	N/A
Telmatherina sarasinorum	Telmatherinidae	N/A	N/A	N/A
Telmatherina wahjui	Telmatherinidae	N/A	N/A	N/A
Tetranesodon conorhynchus	Ariidae	Lorentz Catfish	N/A	N/A
Tetraodon waandersii	Tetraodontidae	N/A	N/A	N/A
Thryssocypris ornithostoma	Cyprinidae	N/A	N/A	N/A
Thryssocypris smaragdinus	Cyprinidae	N/A	N/A	N/A
Thynnichthys polylepis	Cyprinidae	N/A	N/A	N/A
Thynnichthys vaillanti	Cyprinidae	N/A	N/A	N/A
Tominanga aurea	Telmatherinidae	N/A	N/A	N/A
Tominanga sanguicauda	Telmatherinidae	Blood-tail Rainbowfish	N/A	N/A
Tondanichthys kottelati	Hemiramphidae	Kottelat's Halfbeak	N/A	N/A
Trigonostigma hengeli OC	Cyprinidae	Glowlight Rasbora	N/A	N/A
Tryphauchenopsis intermedius	Gobiidae	N/A	N/A	N/A
Vaillantella cinnamomea	Balitoridae	Brown Forktail Loach	N/A	N/A
Variichthys jamoerensis	Terapontidae	Jamur Lake grunter	Yamur Lake grunter	N/A
Xenopoecilus oophorus	Adrianichthyidae	Eggcarrying Butingi	N/A	N/A
Xenopoecilus poptae	Adrianichthyidae	Popta's Butingi	N/A	N/A
Xenopoecilus sarasinorum	Adrianichthyidae	Sarasin's Minnow	N/A	N/A
Yirrkala gjellerupi	Ophichthidae	N/A	N/A	N/A
Zenarchopterus alleni	Hemiramphidae	Allen's River Garfish	N/A	N/A
Zenarchopterus ornithocephala	Hemiramphidae	Vogelkop River Garfish	N/A	N/A
Zenarchopterus xiphophorus	Hemiramphidae	N/A	N/A	N/A
Species name	Family	Vernacular name	Other name	Year found
