= Osteochilus sarawakensis =

Conservation status
- Data Deficient (IUCN 3.1)

Scientific classification
- Kingdom: Animalia
- Phylum: Chordata
- Class: Actinopterygii
- Order: Cypriniformes
- Family: Cyprinidae
- Subfamily: Labeoninae
- Genus: Osteochilus
- Species: O. sarawakensis

Binomial name
- Osteochilus sarawakensis Karnasuta, 1993

Species of fish

Osteochilus sarawakensis is a species of cyprinid fish. It is endemic to northern Borneo and occurs in Malaysia (Sarawak and Sabah) and in Brunei. It occurs in mountain streams in the upper reaches of river basins with forested vegetation, clear water, and rapid current.
