= Osteochilus lini =

Conservation status
- Least Concern (IUCN 3.1)

Scientific classification
- Kingdom: Animalia
- Phylum: Chordata
- Class: Actinopterygii
- Order: Cypriniformes
- Family: Cyprinidae
- Subfamily: Labeoninae
- Genus: Osteochilus
- Species: O. lini

Binomial name
- Osteochilus lini Fowler, 1935

Species of fish

Osteochilus lini is a freshwater fish from Southeast Asia. It is found in the lower Mekong River basin, the Chao Phraya River basin, and some coastal drainages; it occurs in Laos, Vietnam, Cambodia, and Thailand. Its common name is dusky face carp.

Osteochilus lini grows to 15 cm (5.9 in) SL. It inhabits marshlands and swamps, but also uses streams and river as passage routes, and can move into flooded forests and fields. It is locally common in the Mekong basin and captured as a foodfish, together with the very common Osteochilus vittatus.

Named in honor of ichthyologist Lin Shu-Yen (1903–1974).
