= Osteochilus ingeri =

Scientific classification
- Kingdom: Animalia
- Phylum: Chordata
- Class: Actinopterygii
- Order: Cypriniformes
- Family: Cyprinidae
- Subfamily: Labeoninae
- Genus: Osteochilus
- Species: O. ingeri

Binomial name
- Osteochilus ingeri Karnasuta, 1993

Species of fish

Osteochilus ingeri is a species of cyprinid fish endemic to Sabah.

== Etymology ==
It was named in honor of Robert F. Inger (1920-2019), from the Field Museum of Natural History (Chicago), who collected type.
