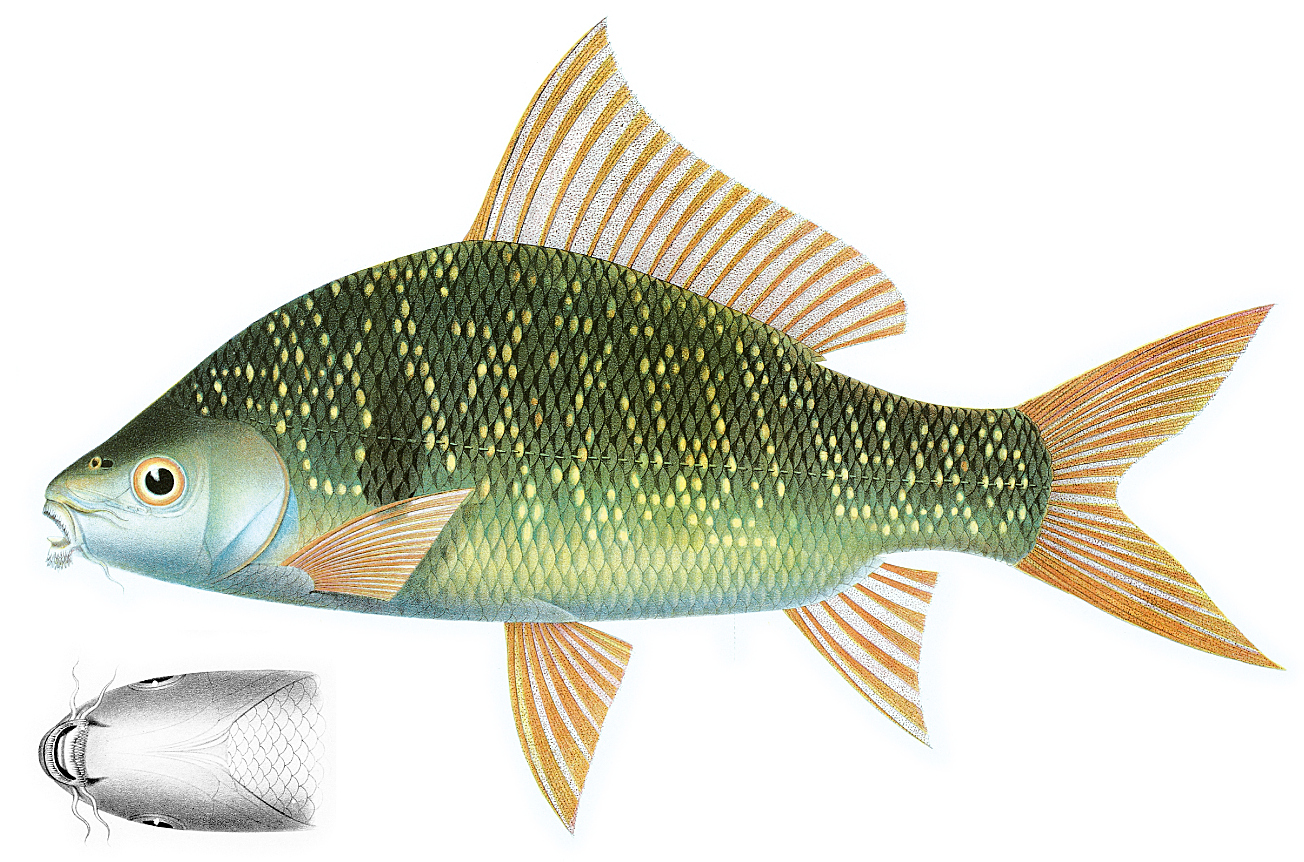
- Osteochilus melanopleura

Scientific classification
- Kingdom: Animalia
- Phylum: Chordata
- Class: Actinopterygii
- Order: Cypriniformes
- Family: Cyprinidae
- Subfamily: Labeoninae
- Genus: Osteochilus; Günther, 1868

Type species
- Rohita melanopleura Bleeker 1852

Synonyms
- Neorohita Fowler, 1937

= Osteochilus =

Genus of fishes

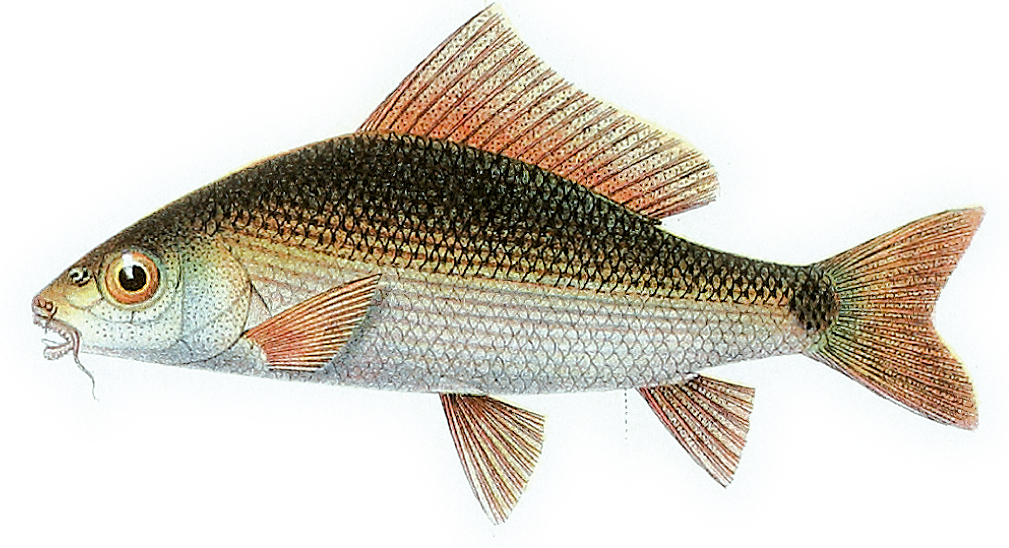
Osteochilus borneensis

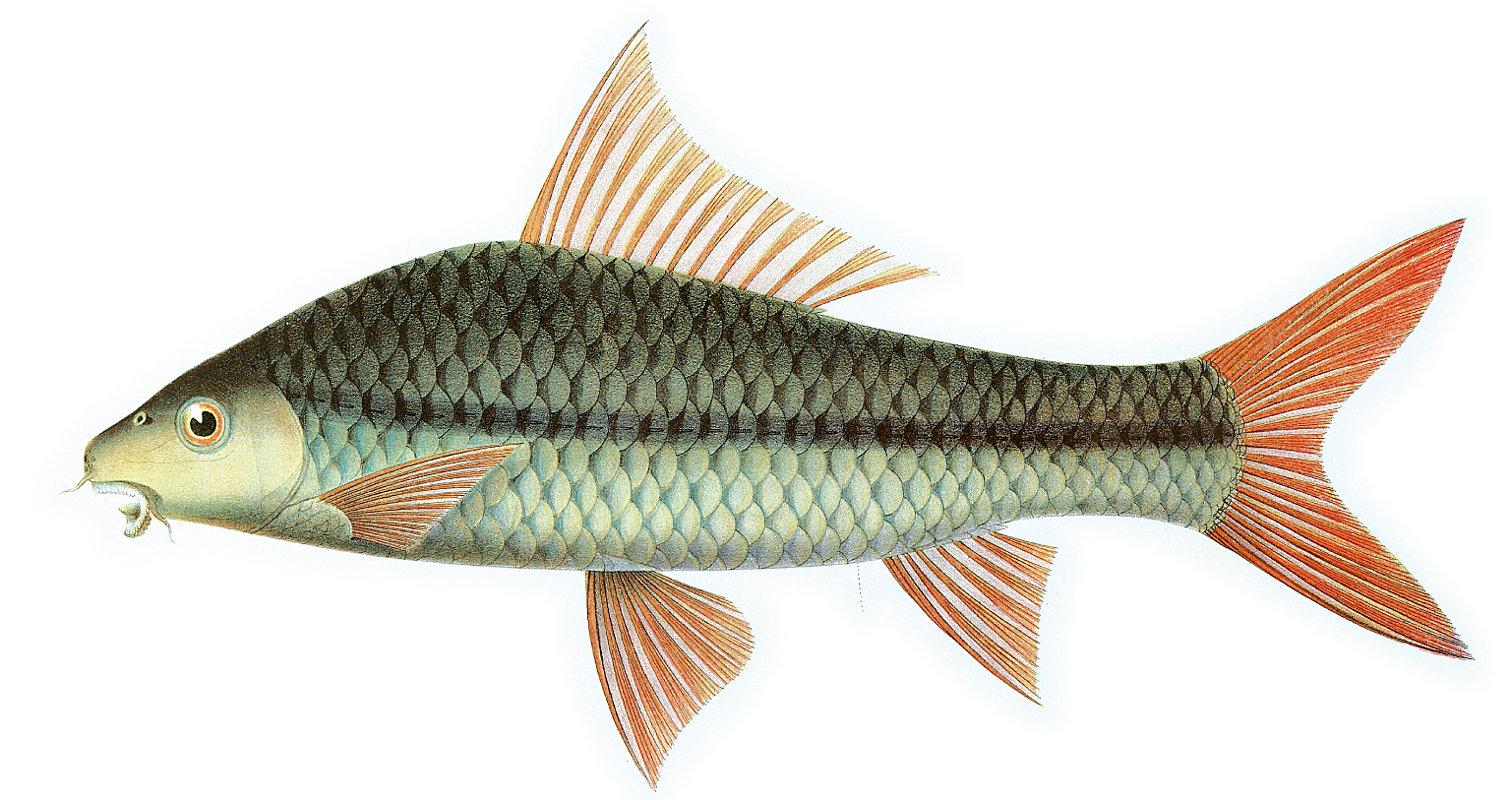
Osteochilus enneaporos

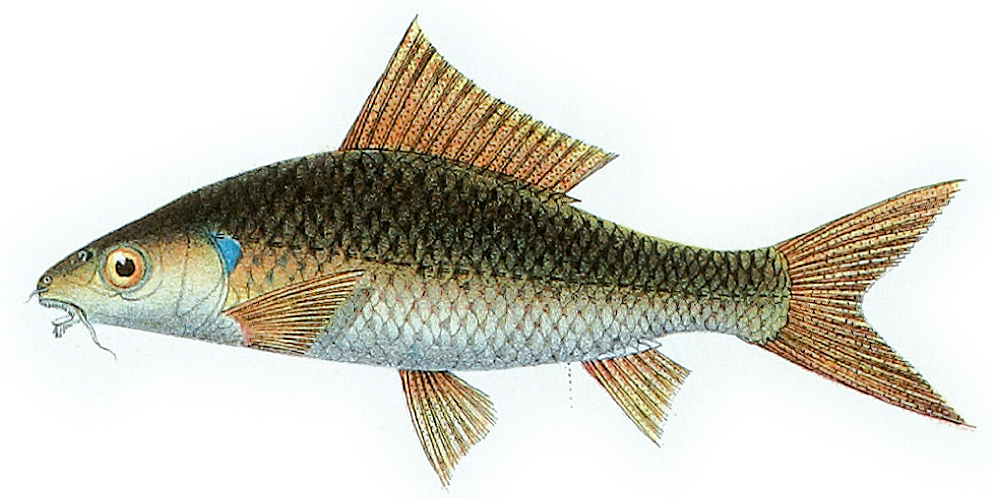
Osteochilus kahajanensis

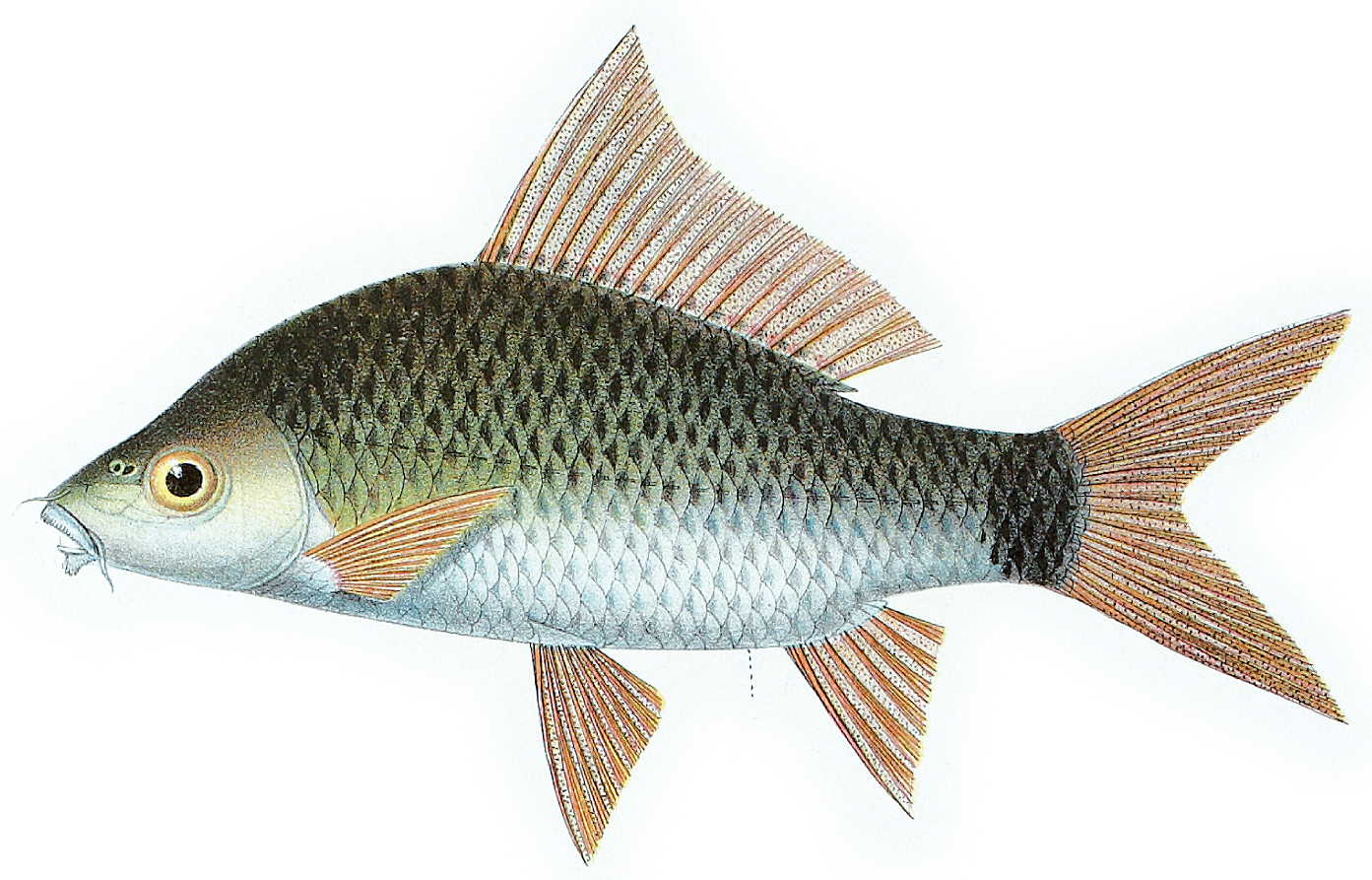
Osteochilus kappenii

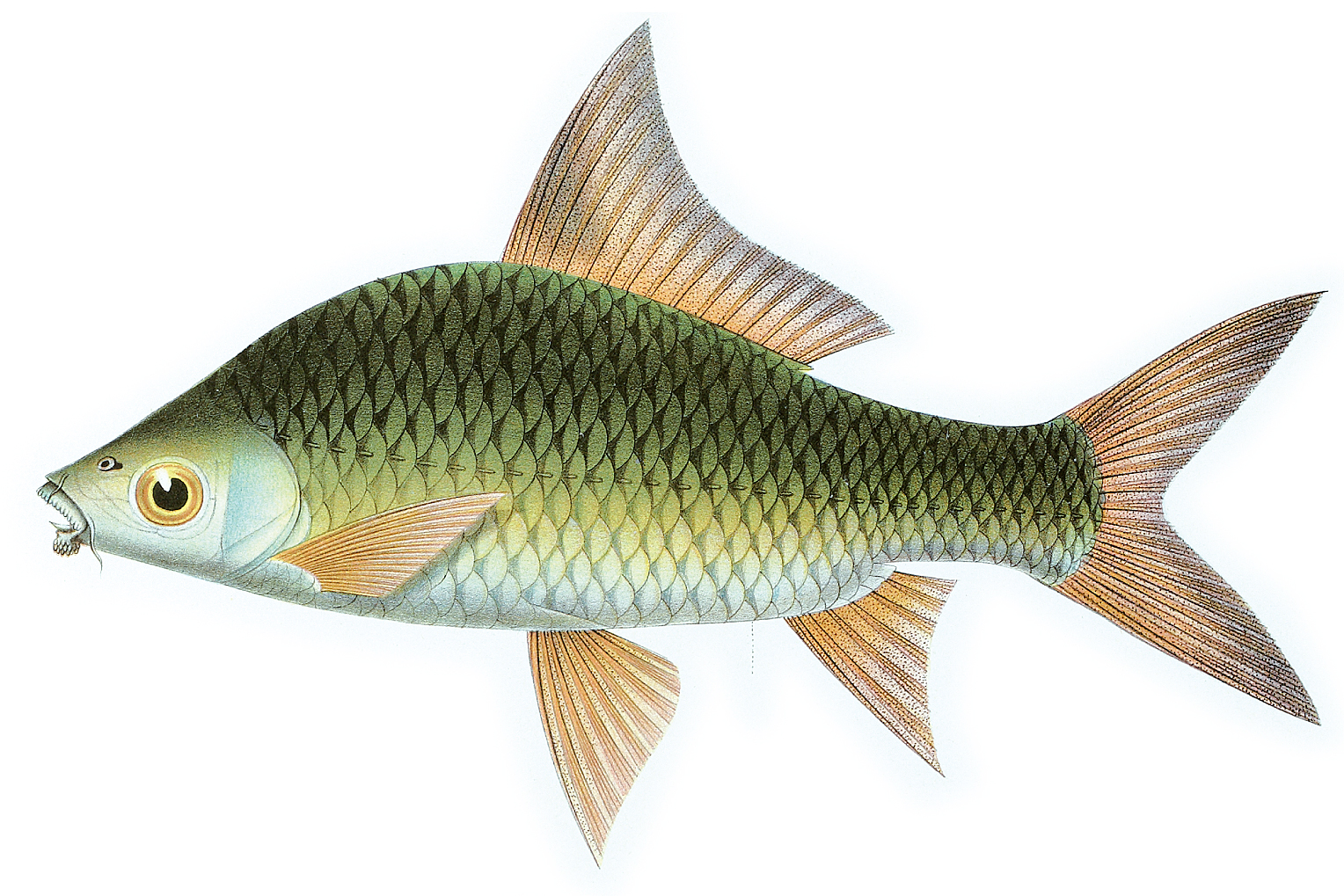
Osteochilus schlegelii

Osteochilus is a genus of freshwater ray-finned fish belonging to the family Cyprinidae, the family which includes the carps, barbs, minnows and related fishes. The fishes in this genus are mainly found in Southeast Asia with a few extending into adjacent parts of China.

== Species ==
These are the currently recognized species in this genus:

- Osteochilus bellus Popta, 1904
- Osteochilus bleekeri Kottelat, 2008
- Osteochilus borneensis (Bleeker, 1857)
- Osteochilus brachynotopteroides Chevey, 1934
- Osteochilus chini Karnasuta, 1993
- Osteochilus enneaporos (Bleeker, 1852)
- Osteochilus flavicauda Kottelat & H. H. Tan, 2009
- Osteochilus harrisoni Fowler, 1905
- Osteochilus ingeri Karnasuta, 1993
- Osteochilus intermedius M. C. W. Weber & de Beaufort, 1916
- Osteochilus jeruk Hadiaty & Siebert, 1998
- Osteochilus kahajanensis (Bleeker, 1856)
- Osteochilus kappenii (Bleeker, 1856)
- Osteochilus kelabau Popta, 1904
- Osteochilus kerinciensis H. H. Tan & Kottelat, 2009
- Osteochilus lini Fowler, 1935
- Osteochilus melanopleura (Bleeker, 1852)
- Osteochilus microcephalus (Valenciennes, 1842)
- Osteochilus partilineatus Kottelat, 1995
- Osteochilus pentalineatus Kottelat, 1982
- Osteochilus repang Popta, 1904
- Osteochilus salsburyi Nichols & C. H. Pope, 1927
- Osteochilus sarawakensis Karnasuta, 1993
- Osteochilus scapularis Fowler, 1939
- Osteochilus schlegelii (Bleeker, 1851) (Giant sharkminnow)
- Osteochilus serokan Hadiaty & Siebert, 1998
- Osteochilus spilurus (Bleeker, 1851)
- Osteochilus striatus Kottelat, 1998
- Osteochilus vittatoides Popta, 1904
- Osteochilus vittatus (Valenciennes, 1842) (Bonylip barb)
- Osteochilus waandersii (Bleeker, 1852)
