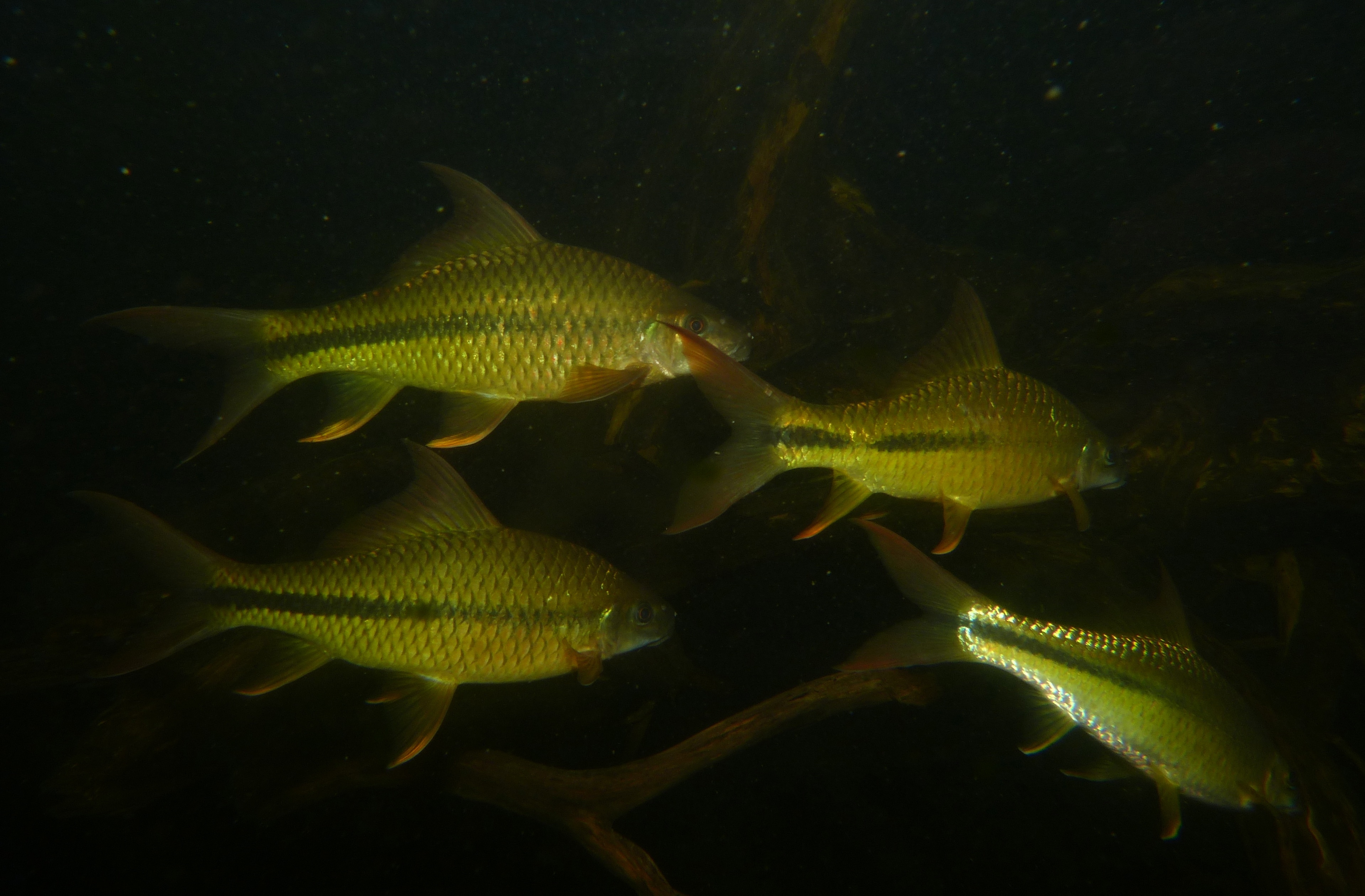

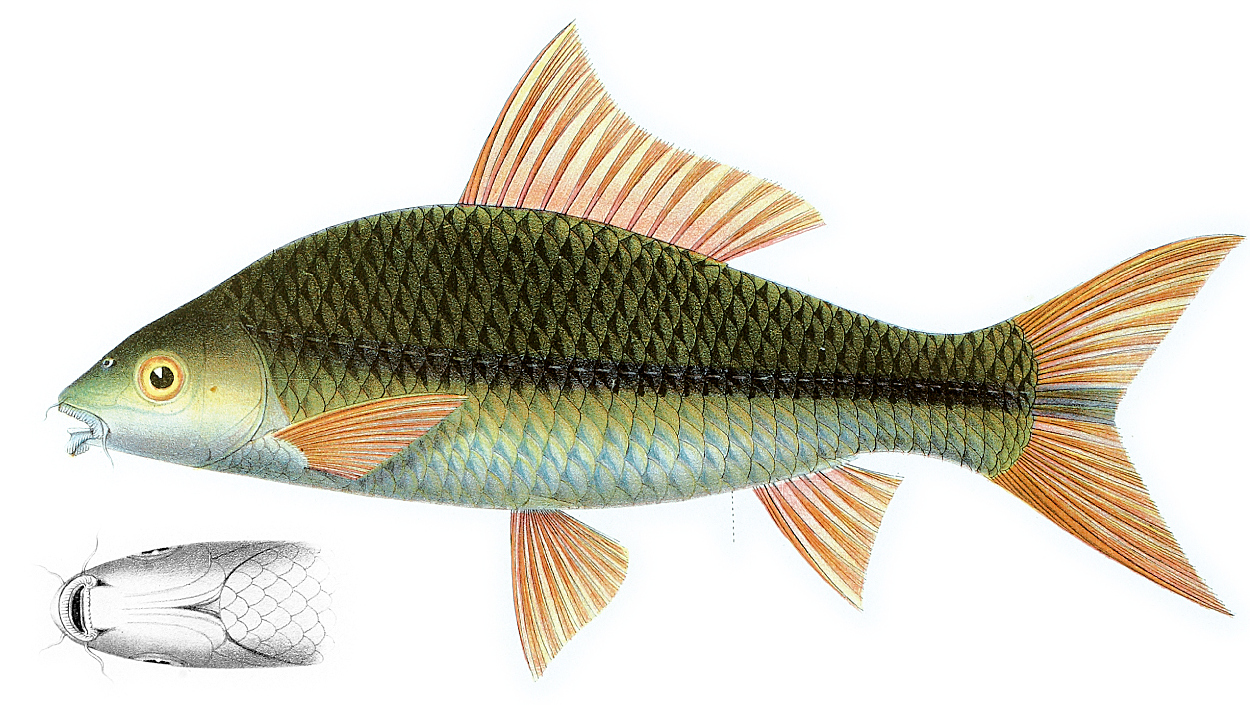
- in Bleeker's Fishes of the Indian Archipelago

Conservation status
- Least Concern (IUCN 3.1)

Scientific classification
- Kingdom: Animalia
- Phylum: Chordata
- Class: Actinopterygii
- Division: Teleostei
- Order: Cypriniformes
- Family: Cyprinidae
- Genus: Osteochilus
- Species: O. waandersii

Binomial name
- Osteochilus waandersii (Bleeker, 1853)

Synonyms
- Rohita waandersii Bleeker, 1853; Labeo soplaoensis Fowler, 1934

= Osteochilus waandersii =

Waanders's hard-lipped barb

Species of fish

Osteochilus waandersii is a cyprinid freshwater fish from Southeast Asia. It is found in Indochina (including the lower Mekong River and Chao Phraya River) as well as in Sumatra and Borneo. Its common name is Waandersii's bony-lipped barb or Waanders's hard-lipped barb.

== Etymology ==
The specific name waandersii honours Henri Louis van Bloemen Waanders (1821–1883), administrator of the tin mines of Bangka Island, off Sumatra.

== Habitat ==
It inhabits submontane streams to highland waterfalls. It is migratory in larger river systems. It can move into flooded forests adjacent to upland streams.

== Description ==
Osteochilus waandersii has a well-defined black stripe along the sides, running from the gill opening to the end of the median caudal fin rays. Caudal, dorsal, anal, and pelvic fins are bright orange or red. It grows to 27.6 cm (10.9 in) TL.

== Utilization ==
Osteochilus waandersii is present in local small-scale fisheries and occasionally in aquarium trade.
