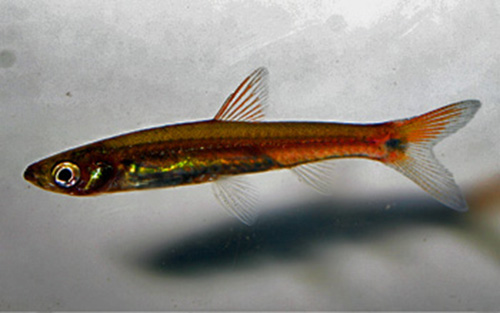
- Pectenocypris korthausae

Scientific classification
- Kingdom: Animalia
- Phylum: Chordata
- Class: Actinopterygii
- Order: Cypriniformes
- Family: Danionidae
- Subfamily: Rasborinae
- Genus: Pectenocypris; Kottelat, 1982

Type species
- Pectenocypris korthhausae Kottelat, 1982

= Pectenocypris =

Genus of fishes

Pectenocypris is a genus of small fish in the family Danionidae endemic to freshwater habitats in Borneo and Sumatra in Indonesia.

== Species ==
There are currently 4 recognized species in this genus:

- Pectenocypris balaena T. R. Roberts, 1989
- Pectenocypris korthausae Kottelat, 1982
- Pectenocypris micromysticetus H. H. Tan & Kottelat, 2009
- Pectenocypris nigra Wibowo, Ahnelt & Kertamihardja, 2016
- Pectenocypris rubra Ahnelt, Wibowo & Prianto, 2020
