= Osteochilus striatus =

Conservation status
- Data Deficient (IUCN 3.1)

Scientific classification
- Kingdom: Animalia
- Phylum: Chordata
- Class: Actinopterygii
- Order: Cypriniformes
- Family: Cyprinidae
- Subfamily: Labeoninae
- Genus: Osteochilus
- Species: O. striatus

Binomial name
- Osteochilus striatus Kottelat, 1998

Species of fish

Osteochilus striatus is a species of cyprinid fish endemic to Laos.
