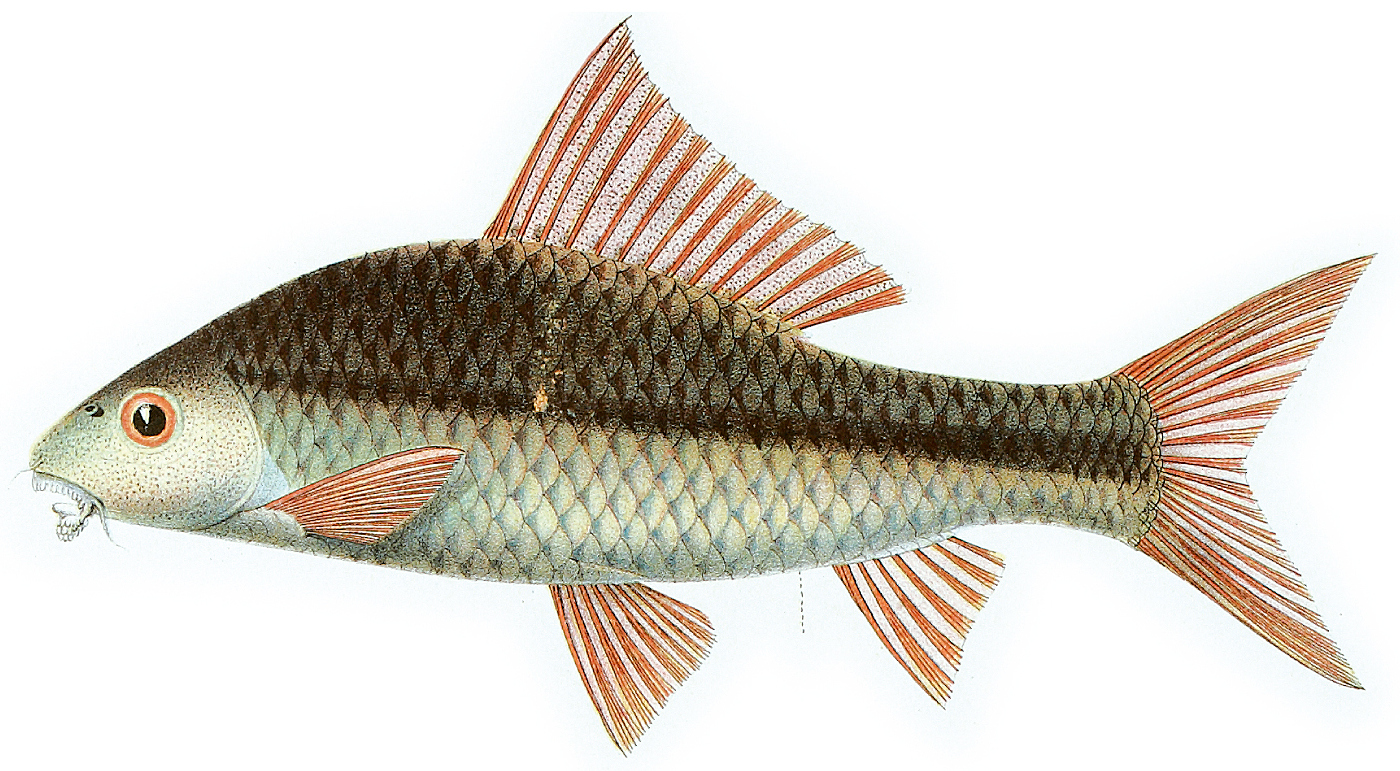
- in Bleeker's Fishes of the Indian Archipelago

Conservation status
- Least Concern (IUCN 3.1)

Scientific classification
- Kingdom: Animalia
- Phylum: Chordata
- Class: Actinopterygii
- Order: Cypriniformes
- Family: Cyprinidae
- Genus: Osteochilus
- Species: O. microcephalus

Binomial name
- Osteochilus microcephalus (Valenciennes, 1842)

= Osteochilus microcephalus =

Species of fish

Osteochilus microcephalus is a cyprinid freshwater fish from Southeast Asia.

== Distribution and habitat ==
Osteochilus microcephalus is found in the Salween, Mae Klong, Chao Phraya, and Mekong River basins, as well as in Peninsular Malaysia, Sumatra, and Borneo. It inhabits lowland freshwater wetlands, canals, and other artificial habitats, and also moves into flooded forests, grasslands, and fields. It is locally common and fished in small-scale fisheries.

== Description ==
Osteochilus microcephalus has a broad black mid-lateral stripe running to the caudal fin base. It grows to 24 cm (9.4 in) SL.
