= Pectenocypris nigra =

Scientific classification
- Domain: Eukaryota
- Kingdom: Animalia
- Phylum: Chordata
- Class: Actinopterygii
- Order: Cypriniformes
- Family: Danionidae
- Subfamily: Rasborinae
- Genus: Pectenocypris
- Species: P. nigra

Binomial name
- Pectenocypris nigra Wibowo, Ahnelt & Kertamihardja, 2016

Species of fish

Pectenocypris nigra is a species of small ray-finned fish from the minnow and carp family, Cyprinidae. It is known only from the very acidic, peaty swamps in central Sumatra. It has a blackish strip along the flanks of its body which is unique in the genus Pectenocypris.
