= Osteochilus salsburyi =

Conservation status
- Least Concern (IUCN 3.1)

Scientific classification
- Kingdom: Animalia
- Phylum: Chordata
- Class: Actinopterygii
- Order: Cypriniformes
- Family: Cyprinidae
- Subfamily: Labeoninae
- Genus: Osteochilus
- Species: O. salsburyi

Binomial name
- Osteochilus salsburyi Nichols & Pope, 1927

Species of fish

Osteochilus salsburyi is a species of cyprinid fish found in Laos, northern Vietnam, and southern China.

Named in honor of physician Clarence G. Salsbury (1885-1980), American Presbyterian Mission of Hainan, for his interest and aid in Nichols' work.
