= Osteochilus harrisoni =

Scientific classification
- Kingdom: Animalia
- Phylum: Chordata
- Class: Actinopterygii
- Order: Cypriniformes
- Family: Cyprinidae
- Subfamily: Labeoninae
- Genus: Osteochilus
- Species: O. harrisoni

Binomial name
- Osteochilus harrisoni Fowler, 1905

Species of fish

Osteochilus harrisoni is a species of cyprinid fish endemic to northern Borneo.

Named in honor of Alfred C. Harrison, Jr. (1869-1925), explorer of Borneo and Sumatra, who collected type.
