= Pectenocypris micromysticetus =

Conservation status
- Near Threatened (IUCN 3.1)

Scientific classification
- Kingdom: Animalia
- Phylum: Chordata
- Class: Actinopterygii
- Order: Cypriniformes
- Family: Danionidae
- Subfamily: Rasborinae
- Genus: Pectenocypris
- Species: P. micromysticetus

Binomial name
- Pectenocypris micromysticetus Tan & Kottelat, 2009

Species of fish

Pectenocypris micromysticetus is a species of cyprinid fish. It is endemic to Sumatra (Indonesia). It is known only from the Batang Hari River basin. It is common in oxbow lakes and still pools in open or recently flooded areas.

Pectenocypris micromysticetus grows to 4.3 cm (1.7 in) standard length.
