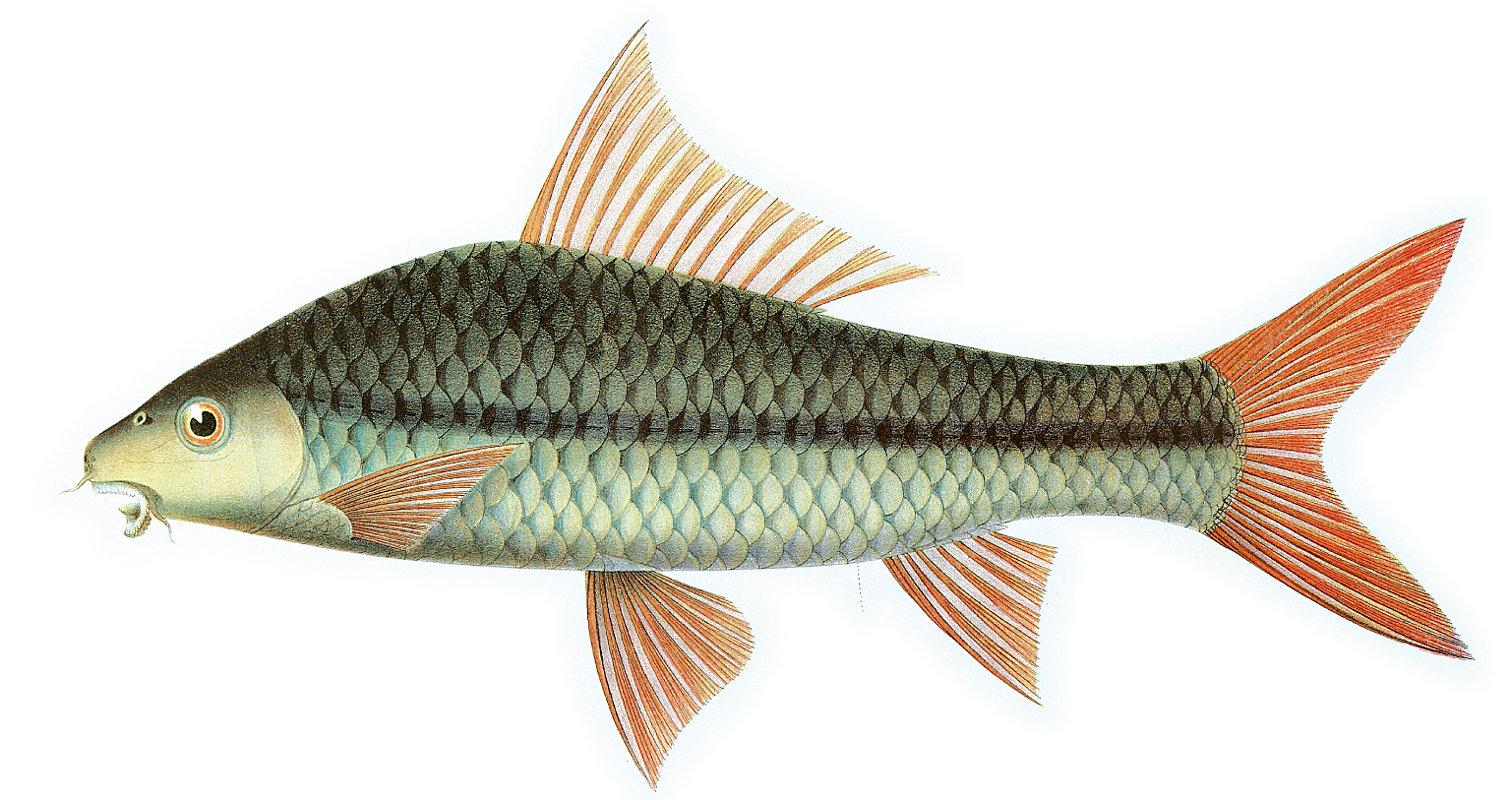

Conservation status
- Data Deficient (IUCN 3.1)

Scientific classification
- Kingdom: Animalia
- Phylum: Chordata
- Class: Actinopterygii
- Order: Cypriniformes
- Family: Cyprinidae
- Subfamily: Labeoninae
- Genus: Osteochilus
- Species: O. enneaporos

Binomial name
- Osteochilus enneaporos Bleeker, 1852)

Synonyms
- Rohita enneaporos

= Osteochilus enneaporos =

Species of fish

Osteochilus enneaporos is a species of cyprinid fish found from Thailand to Indonesia.
