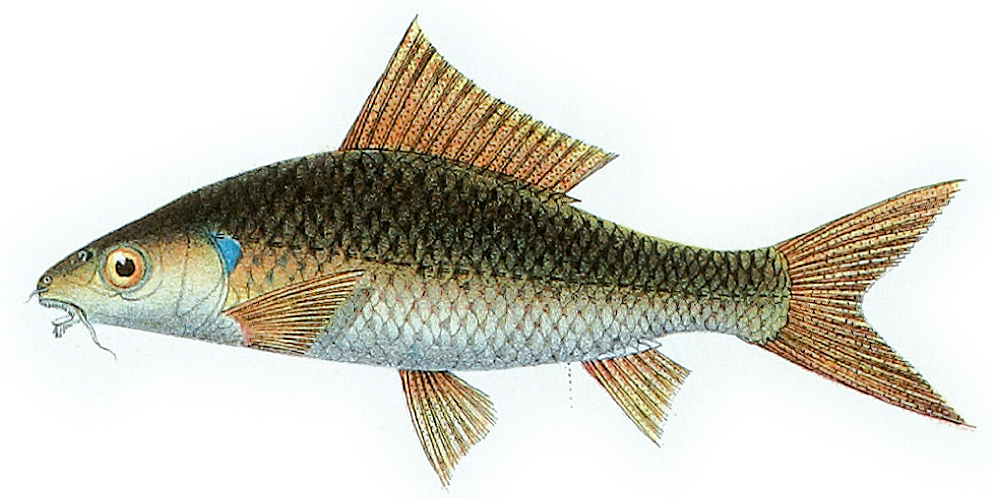

Scientific classification
- Kingdom: Animalia
- Phylum: Chordata
- Class: Actinopterygii
- Order: Cypriniformes
- Family: Cyprinidae
- Subfamily: Labeoninae
- Genus: Osteochilus
- Species: O. kahajanensis

Binomial name
- Osteochilus kahajanensis (Bleeker, 1856)

Synonyms
- Rohita kahajanensis

= Osteochilus kahajanensis =

Species of fish

Osteochilus kahajanensis is a species of cyprinid fish endemic to the southern tip of the Malay Peninsula.

Named after the Kahajan River, Borneo, the type locality.
