= Hermann Schlegel =

German ornithologist, herpetologist and ichthyologist

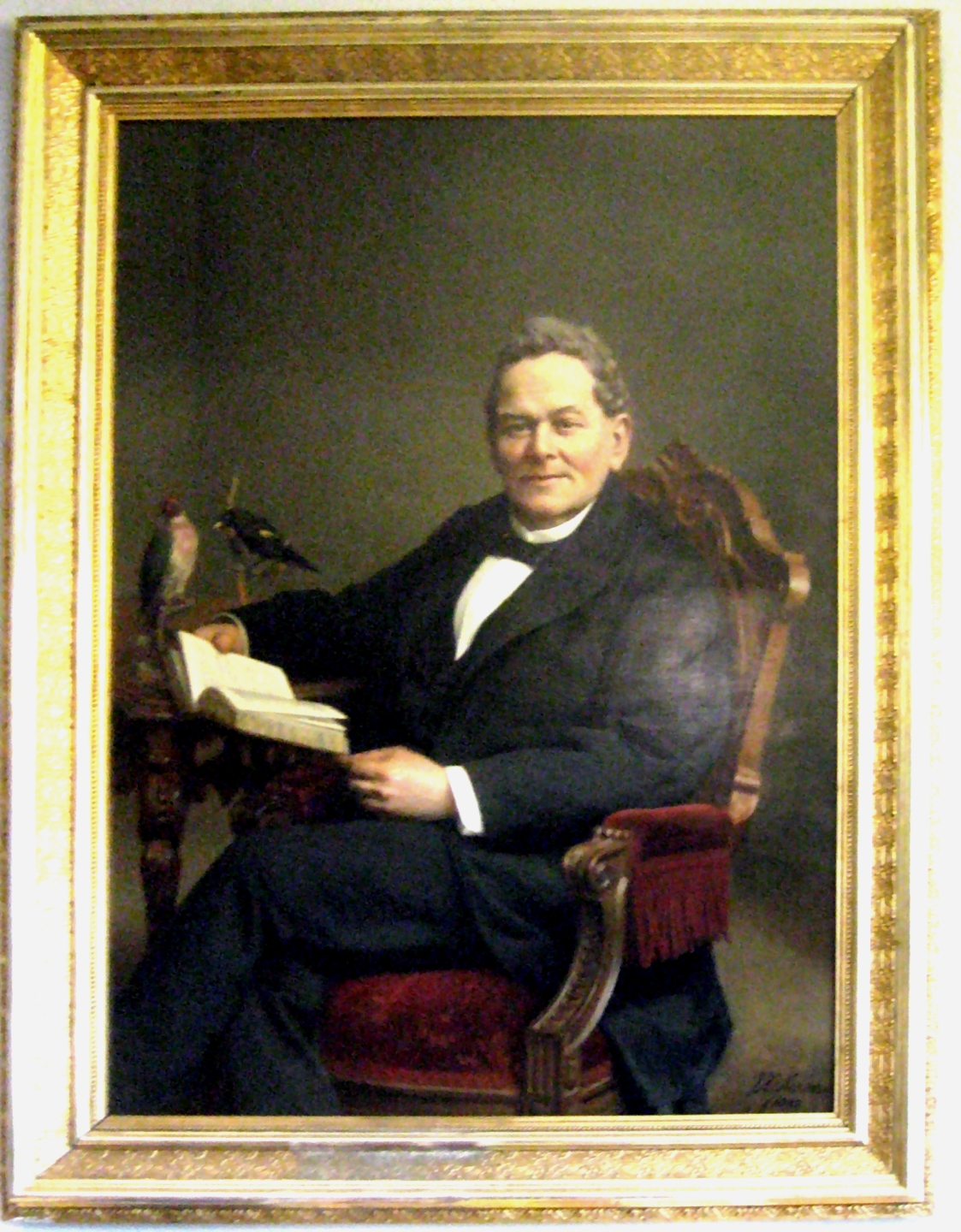
- Born: 10 June 1804; Altenburg, Holy Roman Empire
- Died: 17 January 1884 (aged 79); Leiden, Kingdom of the Netherlands
- Scientific career
- Fields: Ornithology, Herpetology
- Workplaces: Natural history museum of Leiden
- Author abbrev. (zoology): Schlegel

Hermann Schlegel (10 June 1804 – 17 January 1884) was a German ornithologist, herpetologist and ichthyologist.

== Early life and education ==
Schlegel was born at Altenburg, the son of a brassfounder. His father collected butterflies, which stimulated Schlegel's interest in natural history. The discovery, by chance, of a buzzard's nest led him to the study of birds, and a meeting with Christian Ludwig Brehm.

Schlegel started to work for his father, but soon tired of it. He travelled to Vienna in 1824, where, at the university, he attended the lectures of Leopold Fitzinger and Johann Jacob Heckel. A letter of introduction from Brehm to Joseph Natterer gained him a position at the Naturhistorisches Museum.

== Ornithological career ==
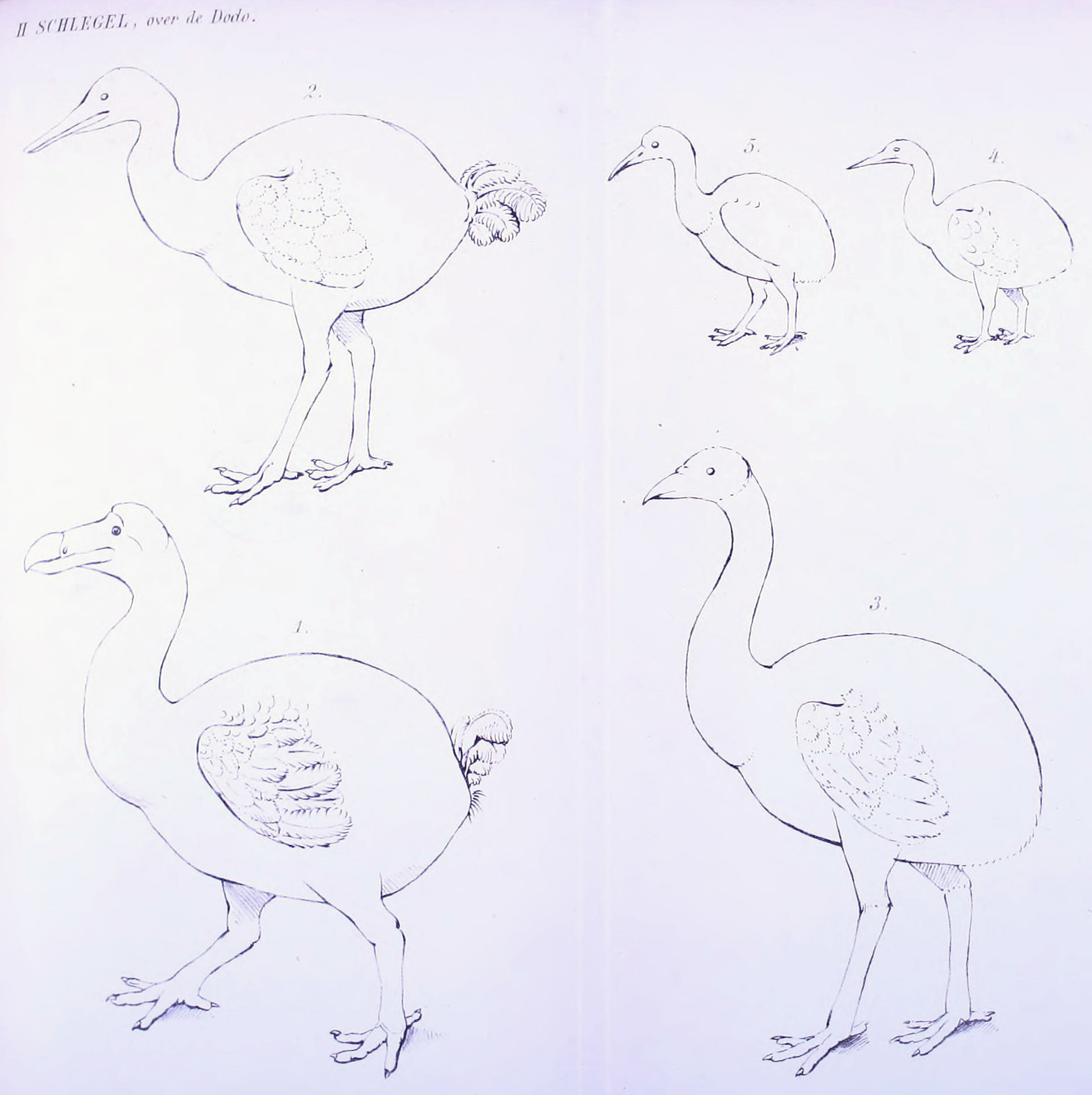
Schlegel's 1854 illustrations of the dodo, the Rodrigues solitaire, and what he thought to be their relatives.

One year after his arrival, the director of this natural history museum, Carl Franz Anton Ritter von Schreibers, recommended him to Coenraad Jacob Temminck, director of the natural history museum of Leiden, who was seeking an assistant. At first Schlegel worked mainly on the reptile collection and wrote Essai sur la Physionomie des Serpens (1837), but soon his field of activity extended to other zoological groups. It had been intended that Schlegel be sent to Java to join the Natural History Commission, but the untimely death of Temminck's intended successor, Heinrich Boie, prevented the realization of this project.

It was at this time that Schlegel met Philipp Franz von Siebold. They became firm friends and collaborated on Fauna Japonica (1845-1850).

In 1847 he became correspondent of the Royal Institute of the Netherlands, when that became the Royal Netherlands Academy of Arts and Sciences in 1851 he became member.

Schlegel considered species as fixed, and consequently from the publication of On the Origin of Species until his death was strongly opposed to Darwin's theory. The English naturalist Charles Darwin knew of Schlegel's opinions on species and evolution from remarks by his close friend, the British botanist and explorer Joseph Dalton Hooker: ‘I talked much with Schlegel, he is strongly in favour of a multiple creation & against migration’.

== Director of the natural history museum ==
When Temminck died at the beginning of 1858, Schlegel succeeded him as director of the natural history museum, after having spent 33 years under his direction. Schlegel was particularly interested in Southeast Asia, and in 1857 sent his son Gustav to collect birds in China. Gustav arrived to find that Robert Swinhoe had gotten there first. In 1859, Schlegel sent Heinrich Agathon Bernstein to collect birds in New Guinea. After the death of Bernstein in 1865, he was succeeded by Hermann von Rosenberg.

Schlegel took on a young assistant, Otto Finsch. At the same time, he started to publish a scientific magazine, Notes from the Leyden Museum, as well as a vast work of 14 volumes, Muséum d'histoire naturelle des Pays-Bas (1862-1880). He employed three talented illustrators: John Gerrard Keulemans, Joseph Smit and Joseph Wolf.

The end of Schlegel's life was difficult: his wife died in 1864, Finsch moved to the natural history museum at Bremen, and the collections of the British Museum started to eclipse those of Leiden.

Schlegel died on 17 January 1884 in Leiden.

His sons are the sinologist and field naturalist Gustaaf Schlegel (1840-1903) and the composer and pianist Leander Schlegel (1844-1913).

== Animal species named for Schlegel ==
In alphabetical order by common name:

- Eyelash viper (Bothriechis schlegelii), a pit viper
- False gharial (Tomistoma schlegelii), a crocodilian
- The Giant sharkminnow (Osteochilus schlegelii), a fish
- Red-headed reed snake (Calamaria schlegeli), a nonvenomous snake
- Royal Penguin (Eudyptes schlegeli), a crested penguin
- Schlegel's adder (Aspidomorphus schlegelii), a venomous elapid snake
- Schlegel’s asity (Philepitta schlegeli), a bird endemic to Madagascar
- Schlegel's beaked blind snake (Afrotyphlops schlegelii), a nonvenomous burrowing snake
- Schlegel's forest skink (Sphenomorphus schlegeli), a lizard
- Schlegel's green tree frog (Rhacophorus schlegelii), a shrub frog

== See also ==
- Category:Taxa named by Hermann Schlegel
