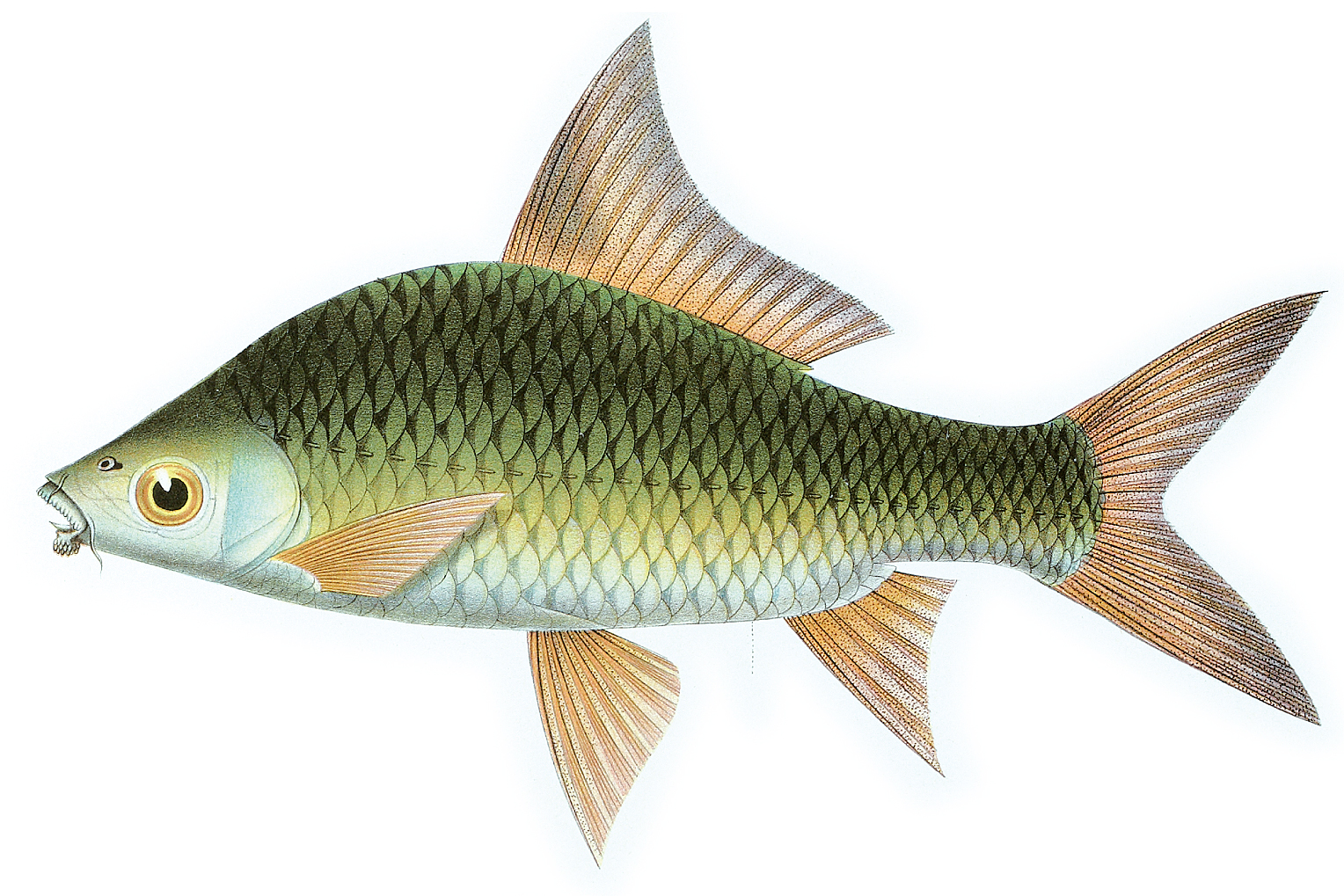

Conservation status
- Data Deficient (IUCN 3.1)

Scientific classification
- Kingdom: Animalia
- Phylum: Chordata
- Class: Actinopterygii
- Order: Cypriniformes
- Family: Cyprinidae
- Subfamily: Labeoninae
- Genus: Osteochilus
- Species: O. schlegelii

Binomial name
- Osteochilus schlegelii (Bleeker, 1851)

Synonyms
- Osteochilus schlegeli; Rohita schlegelii

= Giant sharkminnow =

Species of fish

The giant sharkminnow (Osteochilus schlegelii) a species of cyprinid fish found in southeast Asia.

The name honors Hermann Schlegel (10 June 1804 – 17 January 1884) who was a German ornithologist, herpetologist and ichthyologist.
