= Thryssocypris tonlesapensis =

Conservation status
- Least Concern (IUCN 3.1)

Scientific classification
- Kingdom: Animalia
- Phylum: Chordata
- Class: Actinopterygii
- Order: Cypriniformes
- Family: Danionidae
- Genus: Thryssocypris
- Species: T. tonlesapensis

Binomial name
- Thryssocypris tonlesapensis Roberts & Kottelat, 1984

Species of fish

Thryssocypris tonlesapensis, the anchovy rasbora, is a species of freshwater ray-finned fishes belonging to the family Danionidae, the danios or danionins. This species was described in 1984. It has a maximum length of 6.4 centimetres (2.5 in) among unsexed males and is endemic to the Mekong basin, inhabiting Cambodia and Laos. It has 9-10 dorsal soft rays, 15-16 anal soft rays and 43-44 vertebrae. It is considered harmless to humans and is classified as "least concern" on the IUCN Red List.
