= Thryssocypris wongrati =

Scientific classification
- Kingdom: Animalia
- Phylum: Chordata
- Class: Actinopterygii
- Order: Cypriniformes
- Family: Danionidae
- Genus: Thryssocypris
- Species: T. wongrati

Binomial name
- Thryssocypris wongrati C. Grudpan & J. Grudpan, 2012

Species of fish

Thryssocypris wongrati is a species of freshwater ray-finned fishes belonging to the family Danionidae, the danios or danionins. It inhabits the Chao Phraya River and irrigation canals in its basin in Thailand. Described by Grudpan & Grudpan in 2012, it has not been evaluated on the IUCN Red List as of July 2021. It has a maximum length among unsexed males of 5.2 centimetres (2.0 in), and has 9-10 dorsal soft rays, 14-16 anal soft rays and 39-41 vertebrae. It is considered harmless to humans.

== Etymology ==
The fish is named in honor of Prachit Wongrat, of the Kasetsart University in Bangkok, Thailand, he was the authors’ first teacher in ichthyology.
