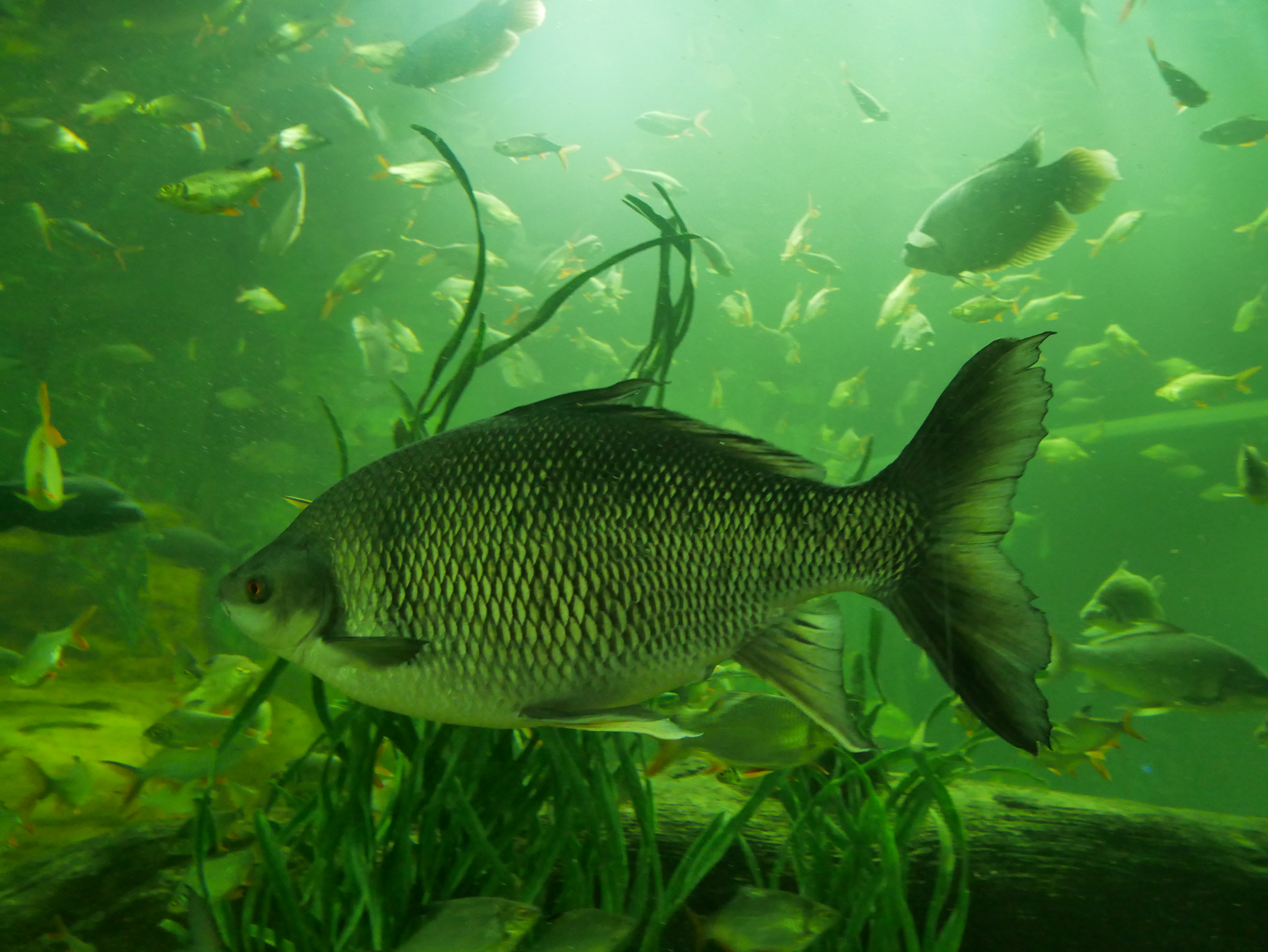
- Captive in Chiang Mai Zoo and Aquarium

Conservation status
- Least Concern (IUCN 3.1)

Scientific classification
- Kingdom: Animalia
- Phylum: Chordata
- Class: Actinopterygii
- Order: Cypriniformes
- Family: Cyprinidae
- Genus: Osteochilus
- Species: O. melanopleura

Binomial name
- Osteochilus melanopleura (Bleeker, 1852)

Synonyms
- Rohita melanopleura Bleeker, 1852; Osteochilus melanopleurus (Bleeker, 1852)

= Osteochilus melanopleura =

Species of fish

Osteochilus melanopleura is a cyprinid freshwater fish from Southeast Asia. It inhabits rivers, swamps, and marshlands, and is adapted to impounded waters and seasonally flooded habitats. It is found in the Mekong River and Chao Phraya River and elsewhere in most countries in Indochina as well as in Sumatra and Borneo. It is eaten as a foodfish and is often processed into fermented products. It grows to 60 cm (24 in) SL.
