= Osteochilus brachynotopteroides =

Conservation status
- Data Deficient (IUCN 3.1)

Scientific classification
- Kingdom: Animalia
- Phylum: Chordata
- Class: Actinopterygii
- Order: Cypriniformes
- Family: Cyprinidae
- Genus: Osteochilus
- Species: O. brachynotopteroides

Binomial name
- Osteochilus brachynotopteroides Chevey, 1934

Species of fish

Osteochilus brachynotopteroides is a fresh water fish in the family Cyprinidae from Southeast Asia. It occurs in the lower Mekong Basin and is present in Laos, Thailand, and Vietnam; it is expected to occur in Cambodia but has not been found there.

Osteochilus brachynotopteroides grows to 15 cm (5.9 in) TL. It is a rare species that seems to prefer hill streams and highland lakes. It is probably present, although not documented, in local subsistence fisheries.
