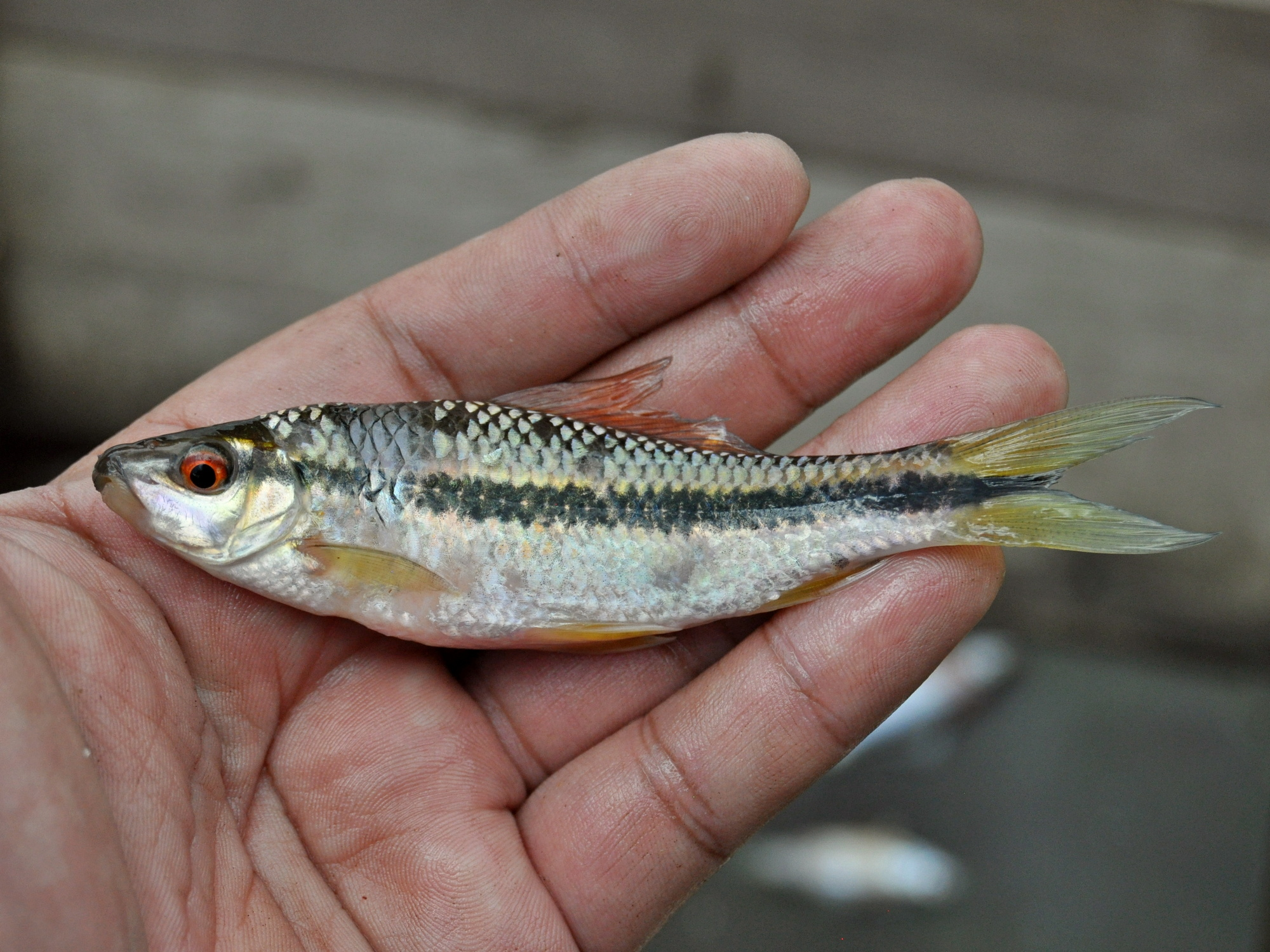

Scientific classification
- Kingdom: Animalia
- Phylum: Chordata
- Class: Actinopterygii
- Order: Cypriniformes
- Family: Cyprinidae
- Subfamily: Labeoninae
- Genus: Osteochilus
- Species: O. flavicauda

Binomial name
- Osteochilus flavicauda Kottelat & Tan, 2009

= Osteochilus flavicauda =

Species of fish

Osteochilus flavicauda is a species of cyprinid fish endemic to the Malay Peninsula.
