= Thryssocypris =

Scientific classification
- Kingdom: Animalia
- Phylum: Chordata
- Class: Actinopterygii
- Order: Cypriniformes
- Family: Danionidae
- Subfamily: Chedrinae
- Genus: Thryssocypris; T. R. Roberts & Kottelat, 1984

Type species
- Thryssocypris smaragdinus Roberts & Kottelat 1984

Genus of fishes

Thryssocypris is a genus of freshwater ray-finned fish belonging to the family Danionidae, the danios or danionins. The fish in this genus are found in Southeast Asia.

== Species ==
There are currently four recognized species in this genus:

- Thryssocypris ornithostoma Kottelat, 1991
- Thryssocypris smaragdinus T. R. Roberts & Kottelat, 1984
- Thryssocypris tonlesapensis T. R. Roberts & Kottelat, 1984
- Thryssocypris wongrati C. Grudpan & J. Grudpan, 2012
