= Osteochilus scapularis =

Scientific classification
- Domain: Eukaryota
- Kingdom: Animalia
- Phylum: Chordata
- Class: Actinopterygii
- Order: Cypriniformes
- Family: Cyprinidae
- Subfamily: Labeoninae
- Genus: Osteochilus
- Species: O. scapularis

Binomial name
- Osteochilus scapularis Fowler, 1939

Species of fish

Osteochilus scapularis is a species of cyprinid fish found in the Malay Peninsula, Borneo, and Sumatra.
