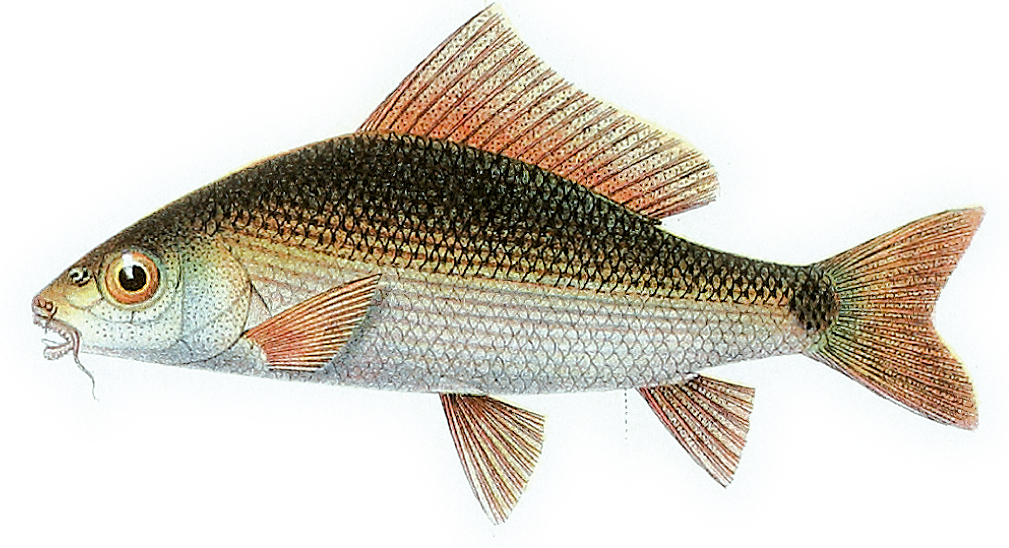

Scientific classification
- Domain: Eukaryota
- Kingdom: Animalia
- Phylum: Chordata
- Class: Actinopterygii
- Order: Cypriniformes
- Family: Cyprinidae
- Subfamily: Labeoninae
- Genus: Osteochilus
- Species: O. borneensis

Binomial name
- Osteochilus borneensis (Bleeker, 1856)

Synonyms
- Rohita borneensis

= Osteochilus borneensis =

Species of fish

Osteochilus borneensis is a species of cyprinid fish endemic to Borneo and Sumatra.
