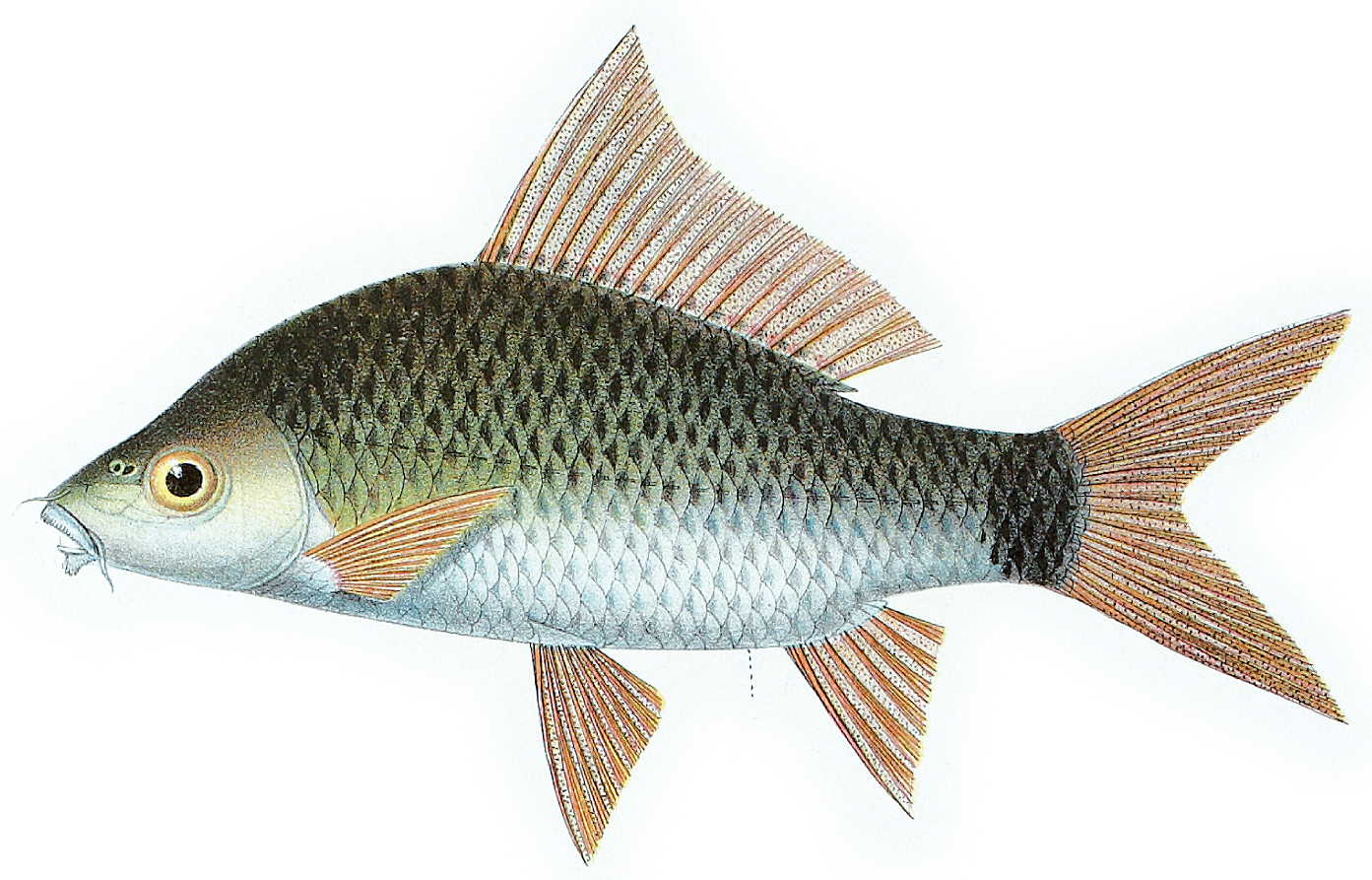

Scientific classification
- Kingdom: Animalia
- Phylum: Chordata
- Class: Actinopterygii
- Order: Cypriniformes
- Family: Cyprinidae
- Subfamily: Labeoninae
- Genus: Osteochilus
- Species: O. kappenii

Binomial name
- Osteochilus kappenii (Bleeker, 1856)

Synonyms
- Rohita kappenii; Osteochilus brevicauda

= Osteochilus kappenii =

Species of fish

Osteochilus kappenii is a species of cyprinid fish endemic to the Kapuas, western Borneo.

Named in honor of Dutch health officer E. F. J. Van Kappen, who collected Bornean fishes for Bleeker.
