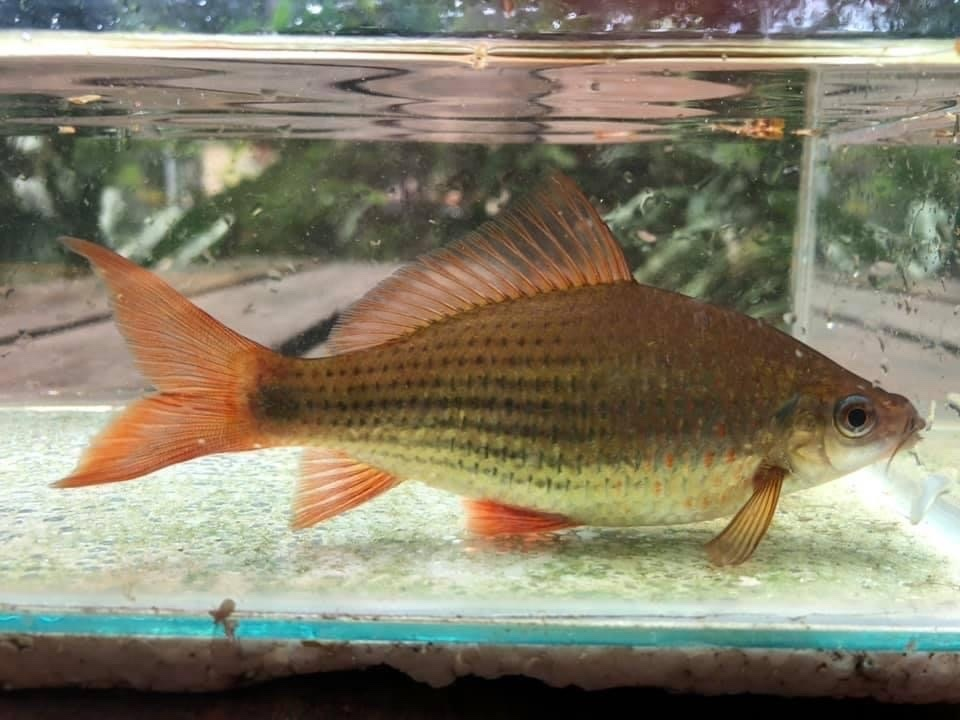

Conservation status
- Least Concern (IUCN 3.1)

Scientific classification
- Kingdom: Animalia
- Phylum: Chordata
- Class: Actinopterygii
- Order: Cypriniformes
- Family: Cyprinidae
- Genus: Osteochilus
- Species: O. vittatus

Binomial name
- Osteochilus vittatus (Valenciennes, 1842)

Synonyms
- Osteochilus hasseltii; Rohita hasseltii; Rohita rostellatus; Rohita vittata

= Osteochilus vittatus =

Species of fish

Osteochilus vittatus is a species of cyprinid fish from Southeast Asia. Its common name is bonylip barb,Hasselt's bony-lipped barb, hard-lipped barb, or silver sharkminnow. It grows to 32 cm (13 in) SL.

== Distribution ==
The species is widely distributed in the Malay Peninsular and Indochina as well as southern China (Yunnan), Java, Sumatra, and Borneo. It occurs in the Salween, Mekong and Chao Phraya basins, as well as in many smaller drainages.

== Habitat ==
It inhabits a wide range of freshwater habitats: lowland marshlands, lakes, peat swamps, rivers, and hill streams. It is usually associated with slow-flowing large streams with muddy to sandy rocky bottom.

== Diet ==
Adults feed on aquatic plants and particularly the roots of the plants (Hydrilla verticillata), unicellular algae and some crustaceans. Young are reported to feed on detritus.

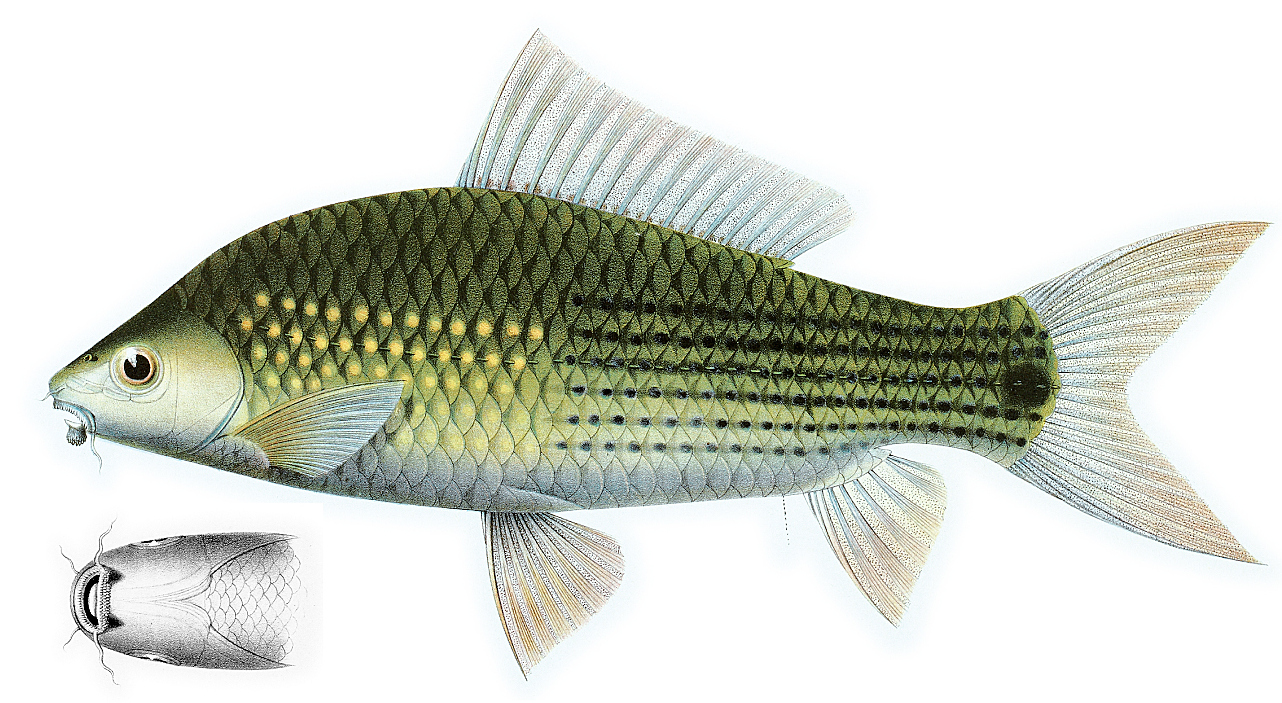
Osteochilus vittatus Bleeker.

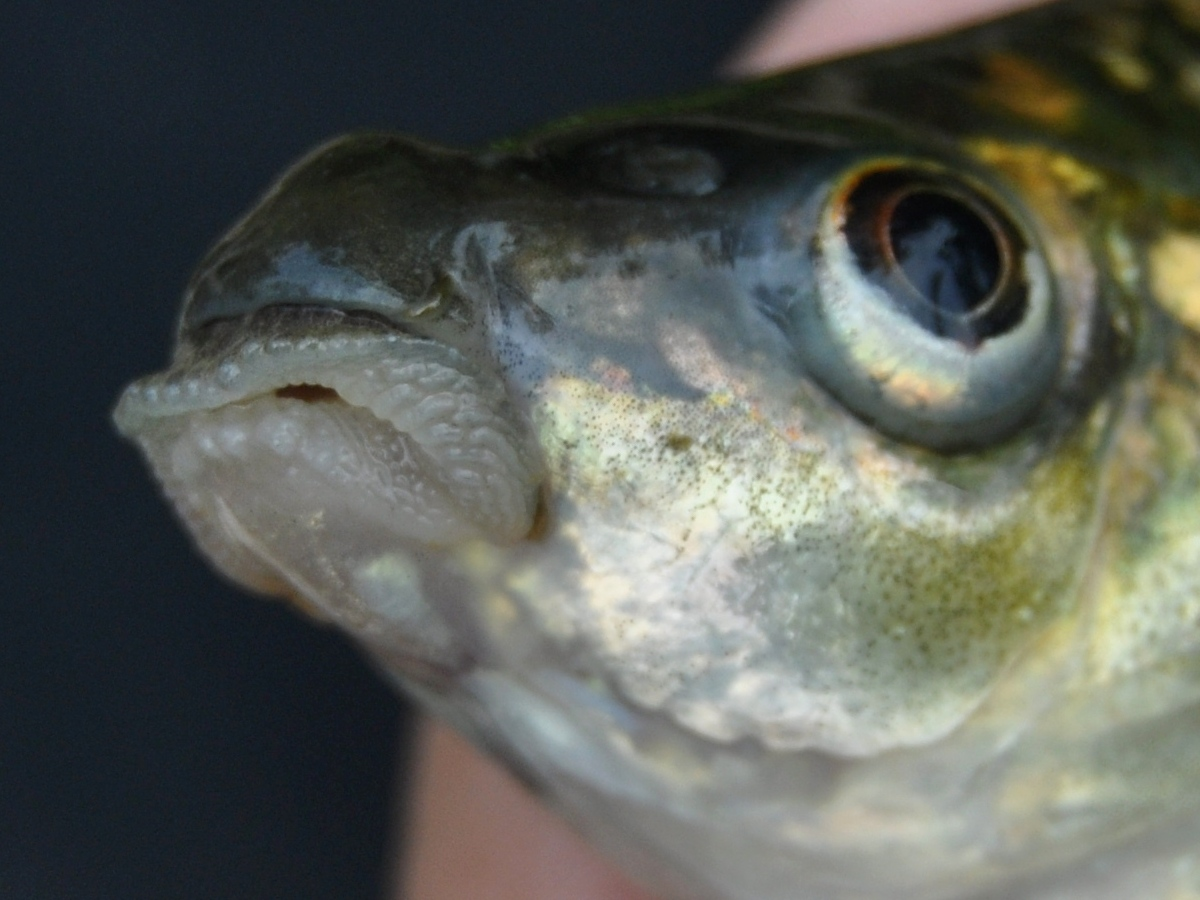
Snout and lip of Osteochilus vittatus

== Utilization ==
Osteochilus vittatus is an important fishery species in the Mekong and Chao Phraya basins. It is occasionally present in aquarium trade.
