= Pectenocypris balaena =

Conservation status
- Least Concern (IUCN 3.1)

Scientific classification
- Kingdom: Animalia
- Phylum: Chordata
- Class: Actinopterygii
- Order: Cypriniformes
- Family: Danionidae
- Subfamily: Rasborinae
- Genus: Pectenocypris
- Species: P. balaena

Binomial name
- Pectenocypris balaena T. R. Roberts, 1989

Species of fish

Pectenocypris balaena is a fish species in the genus Pectenocypris from Borneo.
