= Osteochilus jeruk =

Scientific classification
- Domain: Eukaryota
- Kingdom: Animalia
- Phylum: Chordata
- Class: Actinopterygii
- Order: Cypriniformes
- Family: Cyprinidae
- Subfamily: Labeoninae
- Genus: Osteochilus
- Species: O. jeruk

Binomial name
- Osteochilus jeruk Hadiaty & Siebert, 1998

Species of fish

Osteochilus jeruk is a species of cyprinid fish endemic to Sumatra.
