= Betta foerschi =

Conservation status
- Endangered (IUCN 3.1)

Scientific classification
- Kingdom: Animalia
- Phylum: Chordata
- Class: Actinopterygii
- Order: Anabantiformes
- Family: Osphronemidae
- Genus: Betta
- Species: B. foerschi

Binomial name
- Betta foerschi Vierke, 1979

Species of fish

Betta foerschi is a species of gourami endemic to the island of Borneo, where it is only known from the southern portion. It inhabits creeks in the rain forest. This species grows to a length of 7 cm (2.8 in). It can be found in the aquarium trade. The specific name of this fish honours the German physician and aquarist Walter Foersch (1932–1993), who collected the type with his wife Edith Korthaus. Edith is honoured in the specific name of another species they discovered, Betta edithae. It is a paternal mouthbrooder and it is diurnal.
