= Thryssocypris smaragdinus =

Conservation status
- Data Deficient (IUCN 3.1)

Scientific classification
- Kingdom: Animalia
- Phylum: Chordata
- Class: Actinopterygii
- Order: Cypriniformes
- Family: Danionidae
- Genus: Thryssocypris
- Species: T. smaragdinus

Binomial name
- Thryssocypris smaragdinus Roberts & Kottelat, 1984

Species of fish

Thryssocypris smaragdinus is a species of freshwater ray-finned fishes belonging to the family Danionidae, the danios or danionins. It inhabits western Borneo in Indonesia. It was described in 1984 and is considered harmless to humans. Its maximum length among unsexed males is 5.4 centimetres (2.1 in). It has 9 to 10 dorsal soft rays, 12 to 14 anal soft rays and 38 to 39 vertebrae.
