= Nemacheilus longipinnis =

Scientific classification
- Kingdom: Animalia
- Phylum: Chordata
- Class: Actinopterygii
- Order: Cypriniformes
- Family: Nemacheilidae
- Genus: Nemacheilus
- Species: N. longipinnis

Binomial name
- Nemacheilus longipinnis C. G. E. Ahl, 1922

Synonyms
- Nemacheilus lactogeneus T. R. Roberts, 1989

Species of fish

Nemacheilus longipinnis is a species of ray-finned fish in the genus Nemacheilus.

== Footnotes ==
- Froese, Rainer; Pauly, Daniel (eds.). "Nemacheilus longipinnis". FishBase.
