= Osteochilus intermedius =

Scientific classification
- Domain: Eukaryota
- Kingdom: Animalia
- Phylum: Chordata
- Class: Actinopterygii
- Order: Cypriniformes
- Family: Cyprinidae
- Subfamily: Labeoninae
- Genus: Osteochilus
- Species: O. intermedius

Binomial name
- Osteochilus intermedius Weber & de Beaufort, 1916

Species of fish

Osteochilus intermedius is a species of cyprinid fish endemic to Sumatra and Borneo.
