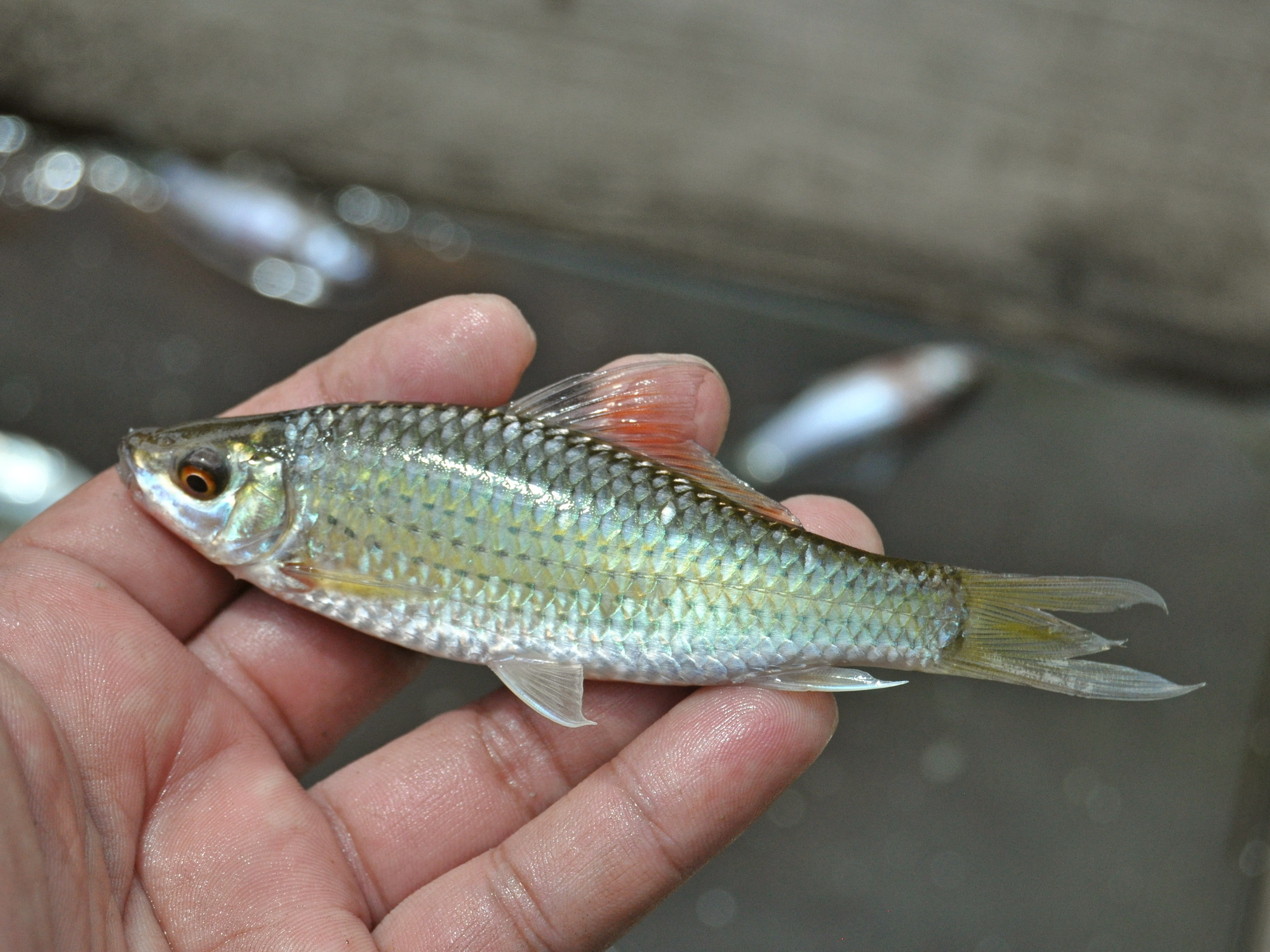

Scientific classification
- Kingdom: Animalia
- Phylum: Chordata
- Class: Actinopterygii
- Order: Cypriniformes
- Family: Cyprinidae
- Subfamily: Labeoninae
- Genus: Osteochilus
- Species: O. bleekeri

Binomial name
- Osteochilus bleekeri Kottelat, 2008

= Osteochilus bleekeri =

Species of fish

Osteochilus bleekeri is a species of cyprinid fish endemic to Borneo and Sumatra.

== Etymology ==
Named in honor of Dutch medical doctor and ichthyologist Pieter Bleeker (1819-1878), who reported this species as Rohita triporos (=O. [Neorohita] microcephalus) in 1852.
