= Osteochilus bellus =

Scientific classification
- Domain: Eukaryota
- Kingdom: Animalia
- Phylum: Chordata
- Class: Actinopterygii
- Order: Cypriniformes
- Family: Cyprinidae
- Subfamily: Labeoninae
- Genus: Osteochilus
- Species: O. bellus

Binomial name
- Osteochilus bellus Popta, 1904

Species of fish

Osteochilus bellus is a species of cyprinid fish endemic to eastern Borneo.
