= Osteochilus pentalineatus =

Scientific classification
- Domain: Eukaryota
- Kingdom: Animalia
- Phylum: Chordata
- Class: Actinopterygii
- Order: Cypriniformes
- Family: Cyprinidae
- Subfamily: Labeoninae
- Genus: Osteochilus
- Species: O. pentalineatus

Binomial name
- Osteochilus pentalineatus Kottelat, 1982

Species of fish

Osteochilus pentalineatus is a species of cyprinid fish endemic to southern Borneo.
