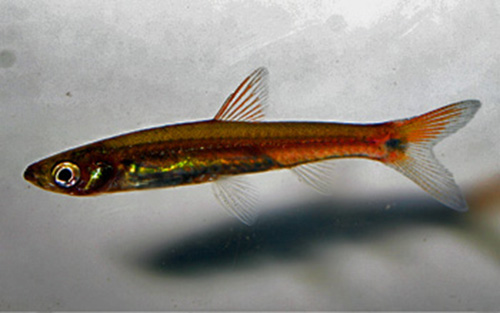

Conservation status
- Near Threatened (IUCN 3.1)

Scientific classification
- Kingdom: Animalia
- Phylum: Chordata
- Class: Actinopterygii
- Order: Cypriniformes
- Family: Danionidae
- Subfamily: Rasborinae
- Genus: Pectenocypris
- Species: P. korthausae

Binomial name
- Pectenocypris korthausae Kottelat, 1982

= Pectenocypris korthausae =

Species of fish

Pectenocypris korthausae is a fish species in the genus Pectenocypris from Sumatra and Borneo.
