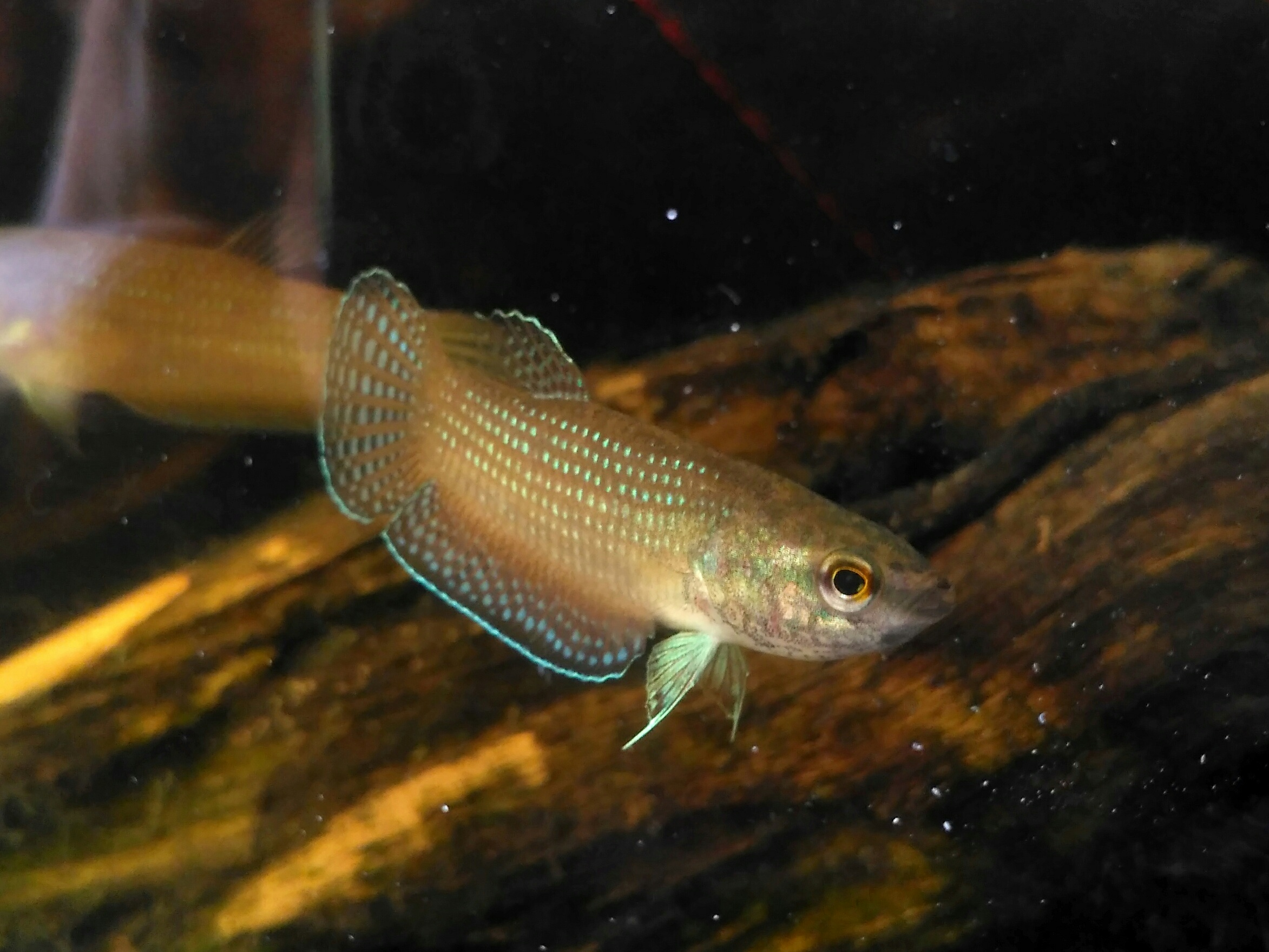

Conservation status
- Least Concern (IUCN 3.1)

Scientific classification
- Kingdom: Animalia
- Phylum: Chordata
- Class: Actinopterygii
- Order: Anabantiformes
- Family: Osphronemidae
- Genus: Betta
- Species: B. edithae

Binomial name
- Betta edithae Vierke, 1984

= Betta edithae =

Species of fish

Betta edithae is a species of gourami endemic to Indonesia where it occurs in Kalimantan, Sumatra and the Riau Archipelago. This species grows to a length of 8.2 cm (3.2 in), and can be found in the aquarium trade. The specific name honours the German aquarist Edith Korthaus (1923-1987), who co-discovered this species with her husband Walter Foersch . Walter is honoured in the specific name of another species they discovered, Betta foerschi.
