= Schistura maculiceps =

Scientific classification
- Kingdom: Animalia
- Phylum: Chordata
- Class: Actinopterygii
- Order: Cypriniformes
- Family: Nemacheilidae
- Genus: Schistura
- Species: S. maculiceps

Binomial name
- Schistura maculiceps (T. R. Roberts, 1989)

Species of fish

Schistura maculiceps is a species of ray-finned fish, a stone loach, in the genus Schistura from Borneo.
