= Thryssocypris ornithostoma =

Conservation status
- Data Deficient (IUCN 3.1)

Scientific classification
- Kingdom: Animalia
- Phylum: Chordata
- Class: Actinopterygii
- Order: Cypriniformes
- Family: Danionidae
- Genus: Thryssocypris
- Species: T. ornithostoma

Binomial name
- Thryssocypris ornithostoma Kottelat, 1991

Species of fish

Thryssocypris ornithostoma of freshwater ray-finned fishes belonging to the family Danionidae, the danios or danionins. The maximum length of an unsexed male is 9.0 centimetres (3.5 in). It feeds on insects and is considered harmless to humans.
