= Osteochilus partilineatus =

Scientific classification
- Domain: Eukaryota
- Kingdom: Animalia
- Phylum: Chordata
- Class: Actinopterygii
- Order: Cypriniformes
- Family: Cyprinidae
- Subfamily: Labeoninae
- Genus: Osteochilus
- Species: O. partilineatus

Binomial name
- Osteochilus partilineatus Kottelat, 1995

Species of fish

Osteochilus partilineatus is a species of cyprinid fish endemic to West Kalimantan, Indonesia.
