= Osteochilus repang =

Scientific classification
- Domain: Eukaryota
- Kingdom: Animalia
- Phylum: Chordata
- Class: Actinopterygii
- Order: Cypriniformes
- Family: Cyprinidae
- Subfamily: Labeoninae
- Genus: Osteochilus
- Species: O. repang

Binomial name
- Osteochilus repang Popta, 1904

Species of fish

Osteochilus repang is a species of cyprinid fish endemic to eastern Borneo, Southeast Asia.
