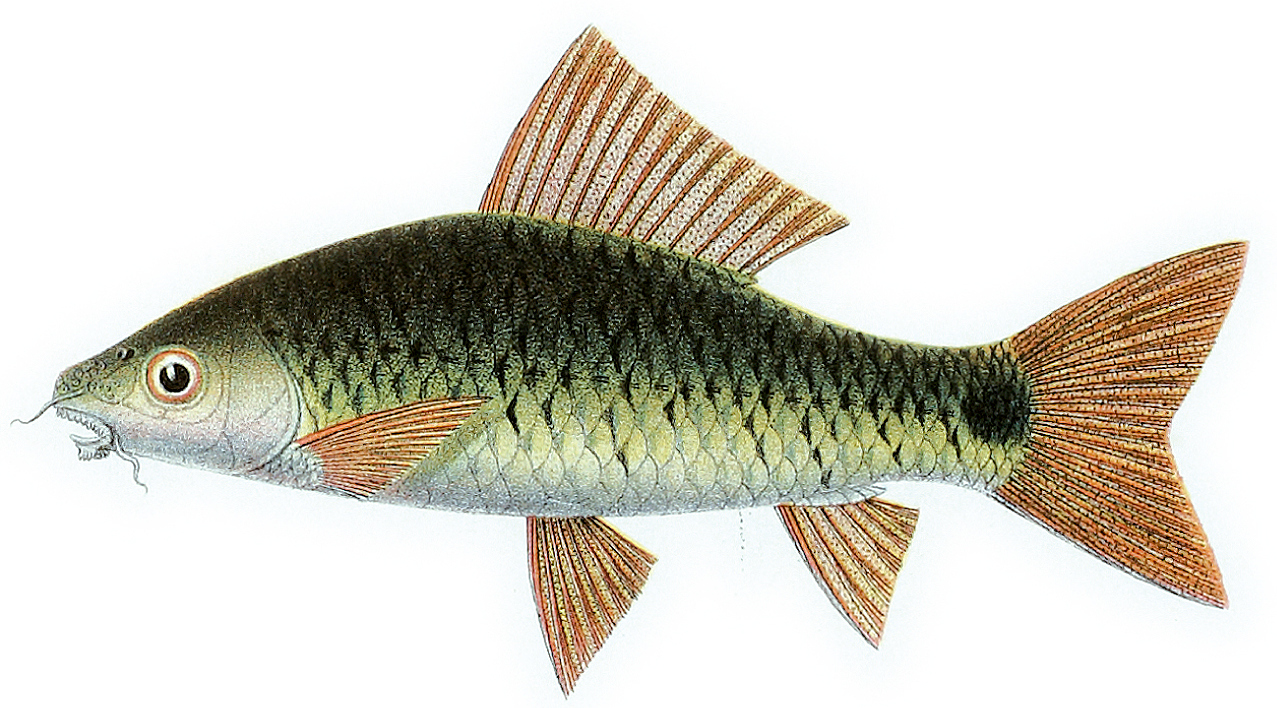
- Osteochilus spilurus (as Rohita oligolepis) in Bleeker's Fishes of the Indian Archipelago

Conservation status
- Least Concern (IUCN 3.1)

Scientific classification
- Kingdom: Animalia
- Phylum: Chordata
- Class: Actinopterygii
- Order: Cypriniformes
- Family: Cyprinidae
- Genus: Osteochilus
- Species: O. spilurus

Binomial name
- Osteochilus spilurus (Bleeker, 1851)

Synonyms
- Dangila spilurus Bleeker, 1851; Rohita oligolepis Bleeker, 1853; Osteochilus oligolepis (Bleeker, 1853)

= Osteochilus spilurus =

Species of fish

Osteochilus spilurus is a cyprinid freshwater fish from Southeast Asia. It is found in Thailand, Peninsular Malaysia, Sumatra, Java, and Borneo. It grows to 7.5 cm (3.0 in) SL.

== Habitat ==
Osteochilus spilurus is common and abundant in creeks and small water bodies in forests. It also occurs in peatswamp forest.
