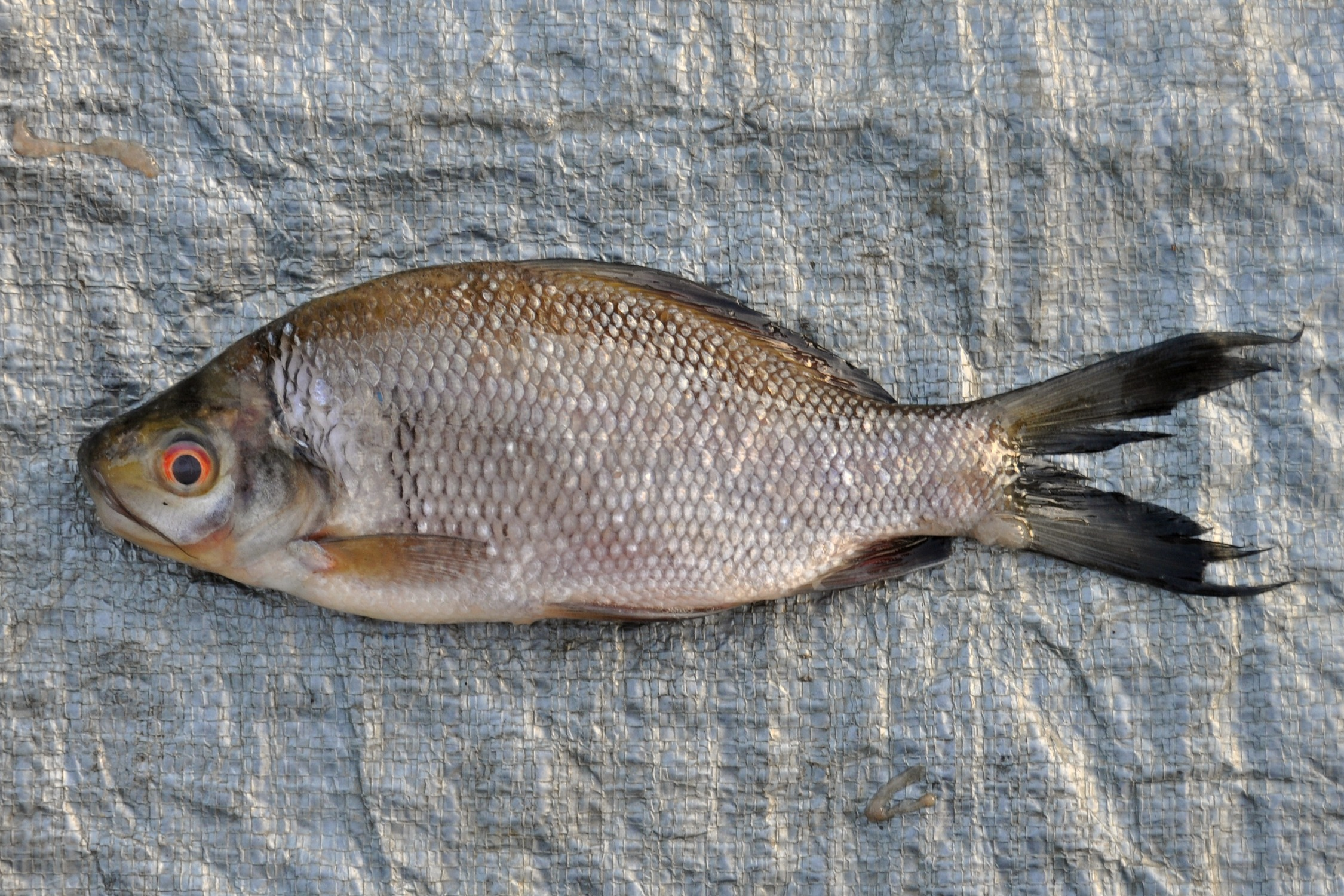
- Osteoc melanop

Scientific classification
- Domain: Eukaryota
- Kingdom: Animalia
- Phylum: Chordata
- Class: Actinopterygii
- Order: Cypriniformes
- Family: Cyprinidae
- Subfamily: Labeoninae
- Genus: Osteochilus
- Species: O. kelabau

Binomial name
- Osteochilus kelabau Popta, 1904

= Osteochilus kelabau =

Species of fish

Osteochilus kelabau is a species of cyprinid fish endemic to eastern Borneo.
