= Jaranthada Karnasuta =

Thai politician (1949–2026)

- จรัลธาดา กรรณสูต
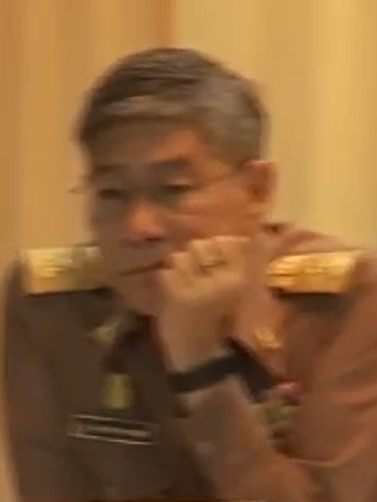
- Karnasuta in 2019

Member of the Privy Council of Thailand
- In office 12 December 2016 – 19 February 2026

Personal details
- Born: 22 August 1949
- Died: 19 February 2026 (aged 76) King Chulalongkorn Memorial Hospital, Bangkok, Thailand
- Education: Kasetsart University (BS)
- Occupation: Civil servant

Jaranthada Karnasuta (Thai: จรัลธาดา กรรณสูต; 22 August 1949 – 19 February 2026) was a Thai civil servant. He graduated from the Faculty of Fisheries, Kasetsart University, and has served in the Department of Fisheries ever since. He served as Director-General of the Department of Fisheries from 2005 to 2007. After retirement, he served on the Privy Council from 2016 to 2026.

Karnasuta died in Bangkok on 19 February 2026, at the age of 76.
