= Acrochordonichthys falcifer =

Scientific classification
- Kingdom: Animalia
- Phylum: Chordata
- Class: Actinopterygii
- Division: Teleostei
- Order: Siluriformes
- Family: Akysidae
- Genus: Acrochordonichthys
- Species: A. falcifer

Binomial name
- Acrochordonichthys falcifer Ng & Ng, 2001

Species of fish

Acrochordonichthys falcifer is a species of catfish of the family Akysidae. It is known only from the Kinabatangan and Segama River drainages, and possibly from the Kayan River drainage, in north-eastern Borneo. A. falcifer falls into the second species group of its genus—the A. rugosus section. It includes A. falcifer, A. chamaeleon, A. pachyderma, and A. rugosus.

== Description ==
A. falcifer can be differentiated from other members of the species group by an adipose fin with a rounded (vs. angular) posterior margin and a longer dorsal-fin base (10.8–13.1% standard length vs. 7.9–10.5); generally the colour pattern of A. falcifer is also different in having many small blotches (vs. few large blotches) of various shades of brown, with many small dark brown spots (vs. no spots) on the dorsal surfaces of the head. Both A. falcifer and A. pachyderma lack serrations on the pectoral spine, but the two species can be separated based on their colouration (cream with numerous small blotches of various shades of brown in A. falcifer vs. overall cream in A. pachyderma) and the shape of the posterior margin of the adipose fin.
