= Acrochordonichthys strigosus =

Conservation status
- Data Deficient (IUCN 3.1)

Scientific classification
- Kingdom: Animalia
- Phylum: Chordata
- Class: Actinopterygii
- Order: Siluriformes
- Family: Akysidae
- Genus: Acrochordonichthys
- Species: A. strigosus

Binomial name
- Acrochordonichthys strigosus Ng & Ng, 2001

Species of fish

Acrochordonichthys strigosus is a species of catfish of the family Akysidae. It is a freshwater fish only known from the Kapuas River drainage in Kalimantan, in the Indonesian part of Borneo. It grows to 8.4 cm (3.3 in) standard length. A detailed discussion of this species's relationship with the other members of its genus can be found on Acrochordonichthys.
