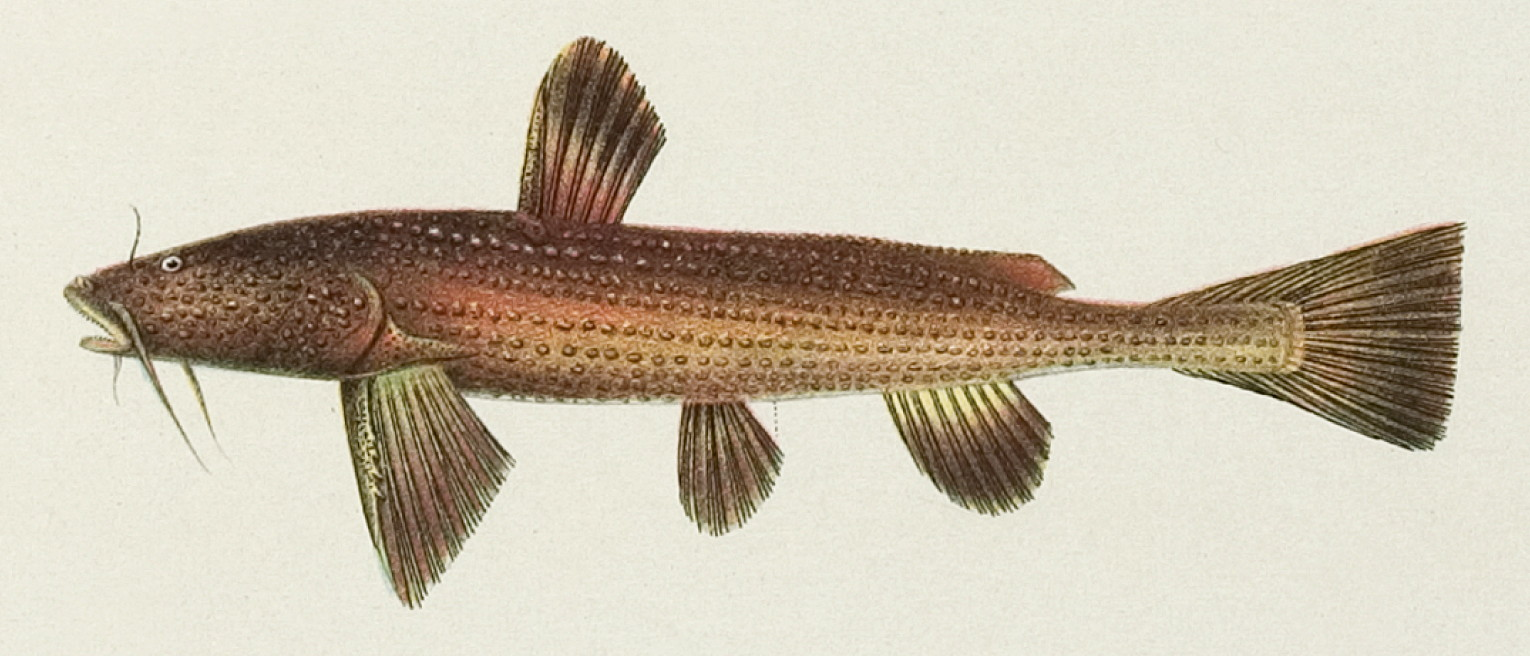
- Acrochordonichthys rugosus

Scientific classification
- Kingdom: Animalia
- Phylum: Chordata
- Class: Actinopterygii
- Order: Siluriformes
- Family: Akysidae
- Subfamily: Parakysinae
- Genus: Acrochordonichthys; Bleeker, 1857

Type species
- Pimelodus melanogaster Bleeker, 1854

Species
- 10, See text

Synonyms
- Sosia Vaillant, 1902

= Acrochordonichthys =

Genus of catfish

Acrochordonichthys is a genus of catfishes (order Siluriformes) of the family Akysidae. It includes ten species.

== Distribution and habitat ==
Acrochordonichthys species are generally found at the bottoms of rivers throughout Southeast Asia. Many of the species are only known from Borneo. A. guttatus is known only from the Barito River drainage in southern Borneo. A. mahakamensis is known only from the Mahakam River drainage in eastern Borneo it is named for. A. chamaeleon and A. strigosus are known only from the Kapuas River drainage in western Borneo. A. falcifer is known only from the Kinabatangan and Segama River drainages, and possibly from the Kayan River drainage, in north-eastern Borneo. A. pachyderma is known only from the Kapuas, Mahakam, and Kinabatangan River drainages in western, eastern, and north-eastern Borneo, respectively.

A. septentrionalis is known only from the Mae Klong River drainage in Thailand and the Pahang River drainage in Peninsular Malaysia; it may be found in the Bernam River drainage in Peninsular Malaysia. A. rugosus is known from the Solo, Ciliwung, and Citarum River drainages in Java; the Barito, Kapuas, Mahakam, and Rajang River drainages in Borneo; the Bernam, Terengganu, Mae Nam Sungai Kolok, and Pattani River drainages in Peninsular Malaysia and southern Thailand; and the Musi and Tulangbawan River drainages in Sumatra. A. ischnosoma is known from the Citarum River drainage in western Java and the Musi River drainage in southern Sumatra. A. gyrinus, from the Yom River of the Chao Phraya basin in Thailand, represents the northernmost distribution of this genus.

== Description ==
Acrochordonichthys is characterized by a highly rugose skin with tubercles arranged in longitudinal rows along the side of the body, the presence of a long, low adipose fin, and a truncate caudal fin. The tubercles on Acrochordonichthys may become either greatly hypertrophied or greatly reduced at different stages of the moulting cycle; moulting is known to occur in the related genus Breitensteinia. When they are most developed, the tubercles appear more rounded and tightly packed, but are more squamous (flattened) and further apart when least developed.

The head is broad and depressed, while the body is moderately compressed. The dorsal profile rises evenly but not steeply from tip of snout to the origin of the dorsal fin, then slopes gently ventrally from there to end of caudal peduncle. The ventral profile is horizontal to origin of the anal fin, then slopes dorsally to end of the caudal peduncle. The head is covered with small tubercles with poorly demarcated and indistinct margins, and the body with such tubercles arranged in 5–6 longitudinal rows on each side. The dorsal fin origin is nearer the tip of the snout than caudal flexure. The pectoral spine is stout, with or without serrations on the posterior edge. The caudal fin is weakly emarginate.

Sexual dimorphism has been reported in Acrochordonichthys. Males have the anus situated immediately in front of a genital papilla, which is located posterior to the pelvic fin base. The genital opening is situated at the tip of the papilla, covered by a fleshy flap. In females, the anus is situated more posteriorly and the genital opening is located at the tip of a short genital appendage. In A. ischnosoma, males have a long genital papilla located immediately posterior to anus, while females have a conical genital papilla located immediately posterior to anus.

=== Species groups ===
Based on external morphology, two groups of species can be distinguished easily, both of which may be artificial. The first group, the A. ischnosoma species group, includes A. ischnosoma, A. guttatus, A. gyrinus, A. mahakamensis, A. septentrionalis, and A. strigosus; these species have a narrower head, a more slender caudal peduncle, and 39–41 vertebrae. The second group, the A. rugosus species group, includes A. chameleon, A. falcifer, A. pachyderma, and A. rugosus, in which the fish have a deeper caudal peduncle, a broader head, and 35–37 vertebrae.

Acrochordonichthys species are cryptically colored. The colouration is extremely variable, particularly in the A. rugosus group; colouration is less variable in the A. ischnosoma species group. Most have a light-brown saddle extending for the length of the adipose fin and some have spots on the side of the body in place of the saddle. Variation in colouration may be due to moulting of the skin. However, even though the colouration is highly variable, some general patterns are evident that allows colour to be a useful diagnostic character when variation is taken into account.

In the A. ischnosoma species group, variation in colouration is restricted to the dorsal surface of the head, which ranges from light to chocolate brown. The body colouration is less variable. In A. ischnosoma, a series of longitudinal chocolate brown patches arranged to form a faintly reticulate pattern is present in all specimens observed.

A. guttatus is easily differentiated from other members of the A. ischnosoma group by a slender (vs. moderately thick) humeral process (maximum width 10.0–11.8% its length vs. 13.2–18.4). A. mahakamensis is differentiated from other members of its group by a rounded (vs. angular) anterior margin of the anal fin, and a more slender body. A. septentrionalis can be differentiated by members of the A. ischnoma group by a smaller dorsal to adipose distance (4.4–5.7% standard length vs. 6.2–9.8), fewer branchiostegal rays (4 vs. 5–6) and an almost uniformly cream colour pattern with few very small brown spots (vs. a variegated colour pattern with numerous brown patches). A. strigosus can be differentiated from members of the A. ischnosoma species group by a rounded (vs. angular) posterior margin of the adipose fin and a more slender body; the genital papilla in male A. strigosus is also morphologically different from other members of its species group (short and thick vs. long and thin). A. ischnosoma is distinguished from other members of the A. ischnosoma group by a greater distance between the dorsal fin and adipose fin (9.0–10.1% SL vs. 4.4–8.7) and a greater exposure of the premaxillary teeth when the mouth is closed (one-third vs. less than one-fifth to none). A. gyrinus can be distinguished from its congeners by a concave posterior margin of the pectoral fin.

A. chamaeleon can be differentiated from other members of the A. rugosus species group by shorter nasal barbels (1.0–6.0% length of the head vs. 6.5–23.9), wide-set eyes (distance between eyes 38.9–47·5% length of the head), and a head with gently sloping lateral margins and a broadly rounded snout when viewed dorsally. A. falcifer can be differentiated from other members of the species group by an adipose fin with a rounded (vs. angular) posterior margin and a longer dorsal-fin base (10.8–13.1% standard length vs. 7.9–10.5); generally the colour pattern of A. falcifer is also different in having many small blotches (vs. few large blotches) of various shades of brown, with many small dark brown spots (vs. no spots) on the dorsal surfaces of the head. Both A. falcifer and A. pachyderma lack serrations on the pectoral spine, but the two species can be separated based on their colouration (cream with numerous small blotches of various shades of brown in A. falcifer vs. overall cream in A. pachyderma) and the shape of the posterior margin of the adipose fin. A. pachyderma can be differentiated by its colouration (overall cream vs. generally dark brown with many irregular patches of light brown) and, except for A. falcifer, lack (vs. presence) of serrations on the posterior edge of the pectoral spine. A. rugosus differs from A. chamaeleon in having longer nasal barbels (6.5–15.6% head length vs. 1.0–6.0) and a head with steeply sloping (vs. gentlysloping) lateral margins and a convex (vs. broadly rounded) snout when viewed dorsally; from A. falcifer in having an adipose fin with an angular (vs. rounded) posterior margin; from A. pachyderma in its colouration (generally dark brown with many irregular patches of light brown vs. overall cream) and the presence (vs. lack) of serrations on the posterior edge of the pectoral spine.

== Species ==
- Acrochordonichthys chamaeleon (Vaillant, 1902)
- Acrochordonichthys falcifer Ng & Ng, 2001
- Acrochordonichthys guttatus Ng & Ng, 2001
- Acrochordonichthys gyrinus Vidthayanon & Ng, 2003 (Falcate chameleon catfish)
- Acrochordonichthys ischnosoma Bleeker, 1858
- Acrochordonichthys mahakamensis Ng & Ng, 2001
- Acrochordonichthys pachyderma Vaillant, 1902
- Acrochordonichthys rugosus (Bleeker, 1846)
- Acrochordonichthys septentrionalis Ng & Ng, 2001 (Maeklong chameleon catfish)
- Acrochordonichthys strigosus Ng & Ng, 2001

== Ecology ==
The axillary pore (or porus pectoralis) lying just below the humeral process in Acrochordonichthys is unusually large, and produces a milky-white mucus-like secretion when the fish is severely disturbed. The exact function of this secretion is unknown, but it has ichthyocidal properties. This secretion may therefore be defensive in nature.
