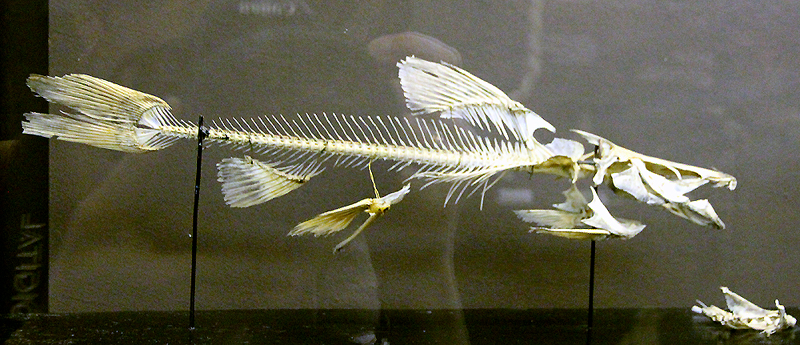
- Akysis skeleton

Scientific classification
- Kingdom: Animalia
- Phylum: Chordata
- Class: Actinopterygii
- Order: Siluriformes
- Family: Akysidae
- Subfamily: Akysinae
- Genus: Akysis; Bleeker, 1858

Type species
- Pimelodus variegatus Bleeker, 1846

= Akysis =

Genus of catfish

Akysis is the largest genus of catfishes (order Siluriformes) of the family Akysidae.

== Taxonomy ==
In 1996, it was determined that Akysis is the sister group to all other akysids, then only including Parakysis, Acrochordonichthys, and Breitensteinia. However, it was acknowledged that the genus Akysis was poorly sampled at the time and may be deemed non-monophyletic in the future.

In 1998, it was recognized that the large genus Akysis includes two species groups. The first species group was the Akysis variegatus group, for species more closely related to the type species; the other group was the pseudobagarius group for species more closely related to the formerly-named Akysis pseudobagarius; the authors recognized it as conceivable that the groups represented two genera, but tentatively retained the species in a single genus. Since then, the genus Pseudobagarius was erected for this species group, leaving only members of the A. variegatus group in the genus Akysis.

In 2007, Laguvia manipurensis was redescribed to the genus Akysis as part of the A. variegatus group.

== Distribution ==
These fish are found in fast-flowing streams in Southeast Asia. This area is bordered by the Irrawaddy River drainage to the west, the Barito River drainage to the east, the Lancangjiang (upper Mekong) drainage to the north, and the Citarum River drainage to the south. Akysis have been reported from Java, Sumatra, Borneo, Tenasserim, Thailand, Myanmar, and, most recently, the distribution of Akysis has been discovered to include India.

== Description ==
These small catfish can be distinguished by their general colouring of yellow markings on a brown background. Fishes of the genus Akysis are diagnosed by having tough leathery skin covered with tubercles which are arranged in longitudinal rows along the sides, the anterior margin of the pectoral spine with a notch visible dorsally, the nasals with expansions beyond the canal-bearing teeth, and no palatal teeth. These fish are distinguished from the members of the genus Pseudobagarius by a number of characteristics: these species have a terminal mouth; the posterior and anterior nostrils being smaller and located further apart with a distance between the base of the nasal barbel and anterior nostril; the anterior nostrils are situated at the tip of a short tube; and the caudal fin is truncate or emarginate rather that forked.

The maximum adult size of Akysis species is less than 70 millimetres (2.8 in) SL.

== Ecology ==
Catfishes of the genus Akysis are small cryptically-coloured species. Akysis are small secretive fishes that occupy a variety of habitats. Most species typically inhabit clear swift-flowing upland streams with sandy or rocky substrates. Some species are reported from the muddy side and main channels and deltas of large rivers. In smaller streams they may be found hiding in leaf litter and woody debris, in patches of live vegetation such as Cryptocoryne affinis, or in shallow riffle areas under coarse gravel or larger stones. Species of Akysis also are reported from the shallow margins to the bottom depths of large rivers where they are usually taken in trawls together with decaying vegetation.

== Species ==
These are the currently recognized species in this genus:

- Akysis bilustris H. H. Ng, 2011
- Akysis brachybarbatus Chen, 1981
- Akysis clavulus H. H. Ng & Freyhof, 2003
- Akysis clinatus H. H. Ng & Rainboth, 2005
- Akysis ephippifer H. H. Ng & Kottelat, 1998
- Akysis fontaneus H. H. Ng, 2009
- Akysis fuliginatus H. H. Ng & Rainboth, 2005
- Akysis galeatus Page, Rachmatika & Robins, 2007
- Akysis hendricksoni Alfred, 1966
- Akysis heterurus H. H. Ng, 1996
- Akysis longifilis H. H. Ng, 2006
- Akysis maculipinnis Fowler, 1934
- Akysis manipurensis (Arunkumar, 2000)
- Akysis microps H. H. Ng & Tan, 1999
- Akysis patrator H. H. Ng, Pawangkhanant & Suwannapoom, 2022.
- Akysis pictus Günther, 1883 (Burmese stream catfish)
- Akysis portellus H. H. Ng, 2009
- Akysis prashadi Hora, 1936 (Indawgyi stream catfish)
- Akysis pulvinatus H. H. Ng, 2007
- Akysis recavus H. H. Ng & Kottelat, 1998
- Akysis scorteus Page, Hadiaty & López, 2007
- Akysis variegatus (Bleeker, 1846)
- Akysis varius H. H. Ng & Kottelat, 1998
- Akysis vespa H. H. Ng & Kottelat, 2004
- Akysis vespertinus H. H. Ng, 2008
