= Acrochordonichthys guttatus =

Scientific classification
- Kingdom: Animalia
- Phylum: Chordata
- Class: Actinopterygii
- Division: Teleostei
- Order: Siluriformes
- Family: Akysidae
- Genus: Acrochordonichthys
- Species: A. guttatus

Binomial name
- Acrochordonichthys guttatus Ng & Ng, 2001

Species of fish

Acrochordonichthys guttatus is a species of catfish of the family Akysidae. It is endemic to Borneo and only known from the Barito River drainage.

Acrochordonichthys guttatus grows to 9.8 cm (3.9 in) standard length.
