= Acrochordonichthys septentrionalis =

Conservation status
- Data Deficient (IUCN 3.1)

Scientific classification
- Kingdom: Animalia
- Phylum: Chordata
- Class: Actinopterygii
- Order: Siluriformes
- Family: Akysidae
- Genus: Acrochordonichthys
- Species: A. septentrionalis

Binomial name
- Acrochordonichthys septentrionalis Ng & Ng, 2001

Species of catfish

Acrochordonichthys septentrionalis, the Maeklong chameleon catfish, is a species of catfish of the family Akysidae. A detailed discussion of this species's relationship with the other members of its genus can be found on Acrochordonichthys.

This species is known from Thailand and from Peninsular Malaysia.
