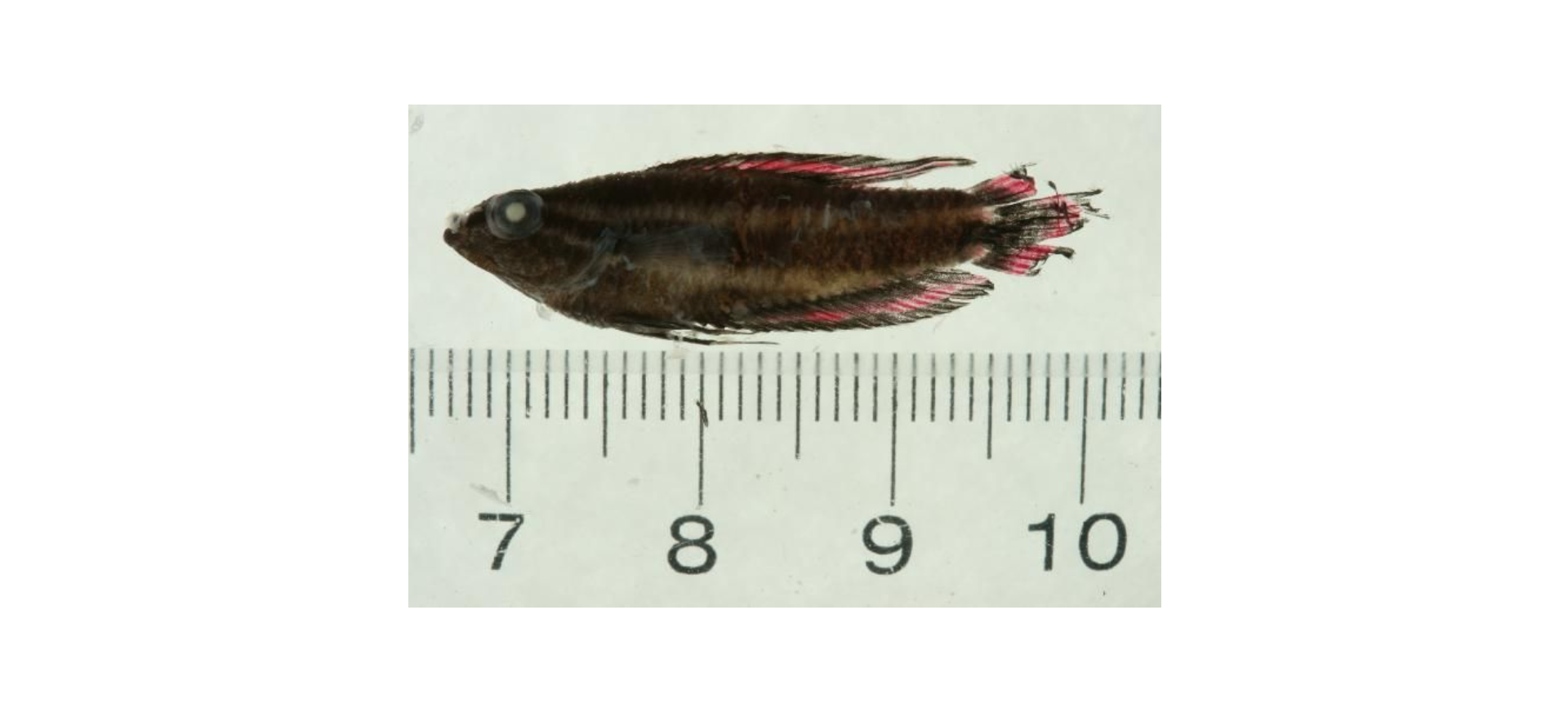

Conservation status
- Endangered (IUCN 3.1)

Scientific classification
- Kingdom: Animalia
- Phylum: Chordata
- Class: Actinopterygii
- Order: Anabantiformes
- Family: Osphronemidae
- Genus: Parosphromenus
- Species: P. tweediei

Binomial name
- Parosphromenus tweediei Kottelat & P. K. L. Ng, 2005

= Parosphromenus tweediei =

Species of fish

Parosphromenus tweediei is a species of gourami. It is native to Asia, where it is known only from the state of Johor in Malaysia. The species reaches 2.5 cm (1 in) in standard length and is known to be a facultative air-breather. It may occur in waters with a pH of as low as 4. Its specific epithet honors Michael Tweedie of the National Museum of Singapore, a naturalist known for his work on the fishes of the Malay Peninsula. It has been present in the aquarium trade since the mid-twentieth century, although it is frequently confused with its more well-known congener P. deissneri.
