= Acrochordonichthys mahakamensis =

Scientific classification
- Kingdom: Animalia
- Phylum: Chordata
- Class: Actinopterygii
- Order: Siluriformes
- Family: Akysidae
- Genus: Acrochordonichthys
- Species: A. mahakamensis

Binomial name
- Acrochordonichthys mahakamensis Ng & Ng, 2001

Species of fish

Acrochordonichthys mahakamensis is a species of catfish of the family Akysidae. A detailed discussion of this species's relationship with the other members of its genus can be found on Acrochordonichthys.
