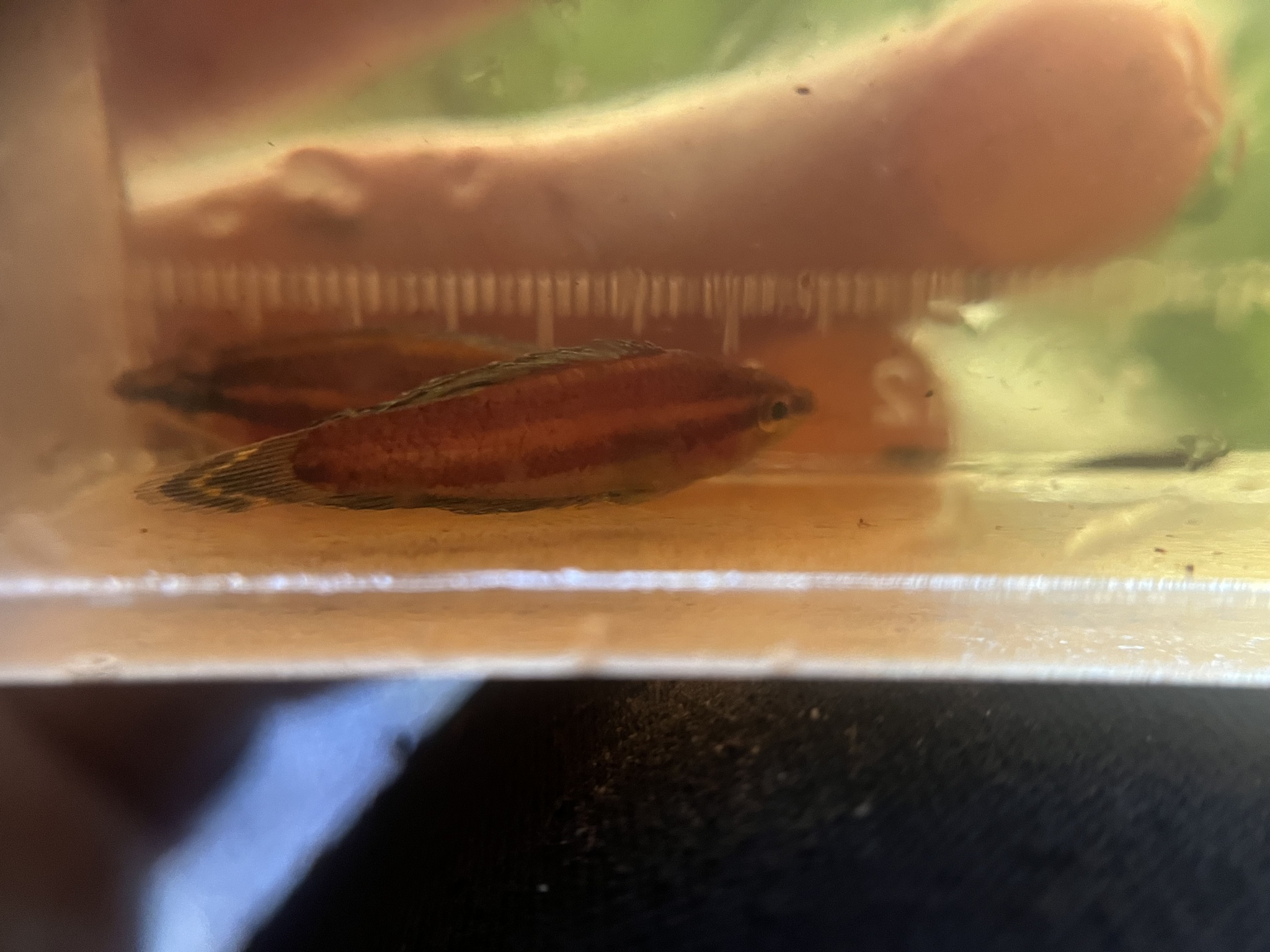

Conservation status
- Critically Endangered (IUCN 3.1)

Scientific classification
- Kingdom: Animalia
- Phylum: Chordata
- Class: Actinopterygii
- Order: Anabantiformes
- Family: Osphronemidae
- Genus: Parosphromenus
- Species: P. alfredi

Binomial name
- Parosphromenus alfredi Kottelat & P. K. L. Ng, 2005

= Parosphromenus alfredi =

Species of fish

Parosphromenus alfredi is a species of gourami. It is native to Asia, where it is known only from freshwater habitats with a pH range of 4.5 to 5.0, including peat swamps, in the state of Johor in Malaysia. The species reaches 2.6 cm (1.0 in) in standard length and is known to be a facultative air-breather. Its specific epithet honors Eric R. Alfred, an ichthyologist and former curator of the National Museum of Singapore noted for his work on the fishes of the Malay Peninsula. It is sometimes kept as an aquarium fish, where it is commonly known as Alfred's licorice gourami.
