= Breitensteinia cessator =

Scientific classification
- Domain: Eukaryota
- Kingdom: Animalia
- Phylum: Chordata
- Class: Actinopterygii
- Order: Siluriformes
- Family: Akysidae
- Genus: Breitensteinia
- Species: B. cessator

Binomial name
- Breitensteinia cessator Ng & Siebert, 1998

Species of fish

Breitensteinia cessator is a species of catfish of the family Akysidae. A detailed discussion of this species's relationship with the other species in the genus can be found at Breitensteinia.
