= Parosphromenus sumatranus =

Conservation status
- Near Threatened (IUCN 3.1)

Scientific classification
- Kingdom: Animalia
- Phylum: Chordata
- Class: Actinopterygii
- Order: Anabantiformes
- Family: Osphronemidae
- Genus: Parosphromenus
- Species: P. sumatranus

Binomial name
- Parosphromenus sumatranus Klausewitz, 1955

Species of fish

Parosphromenus sumatranus is a species of gourami. It is native to Asia, where it is known only from the island of Sumatra in Indonesia. The species reaches 2.3 cm (0.91 in) in standard length and is known to be a facultative air-breather. It is occasionally collected for the aquarium trade, although it is frequently misidentified as its more well-known congener P. deissneri. If correctly identified, it is sometimes referred to as the fire red licorice gourami.
