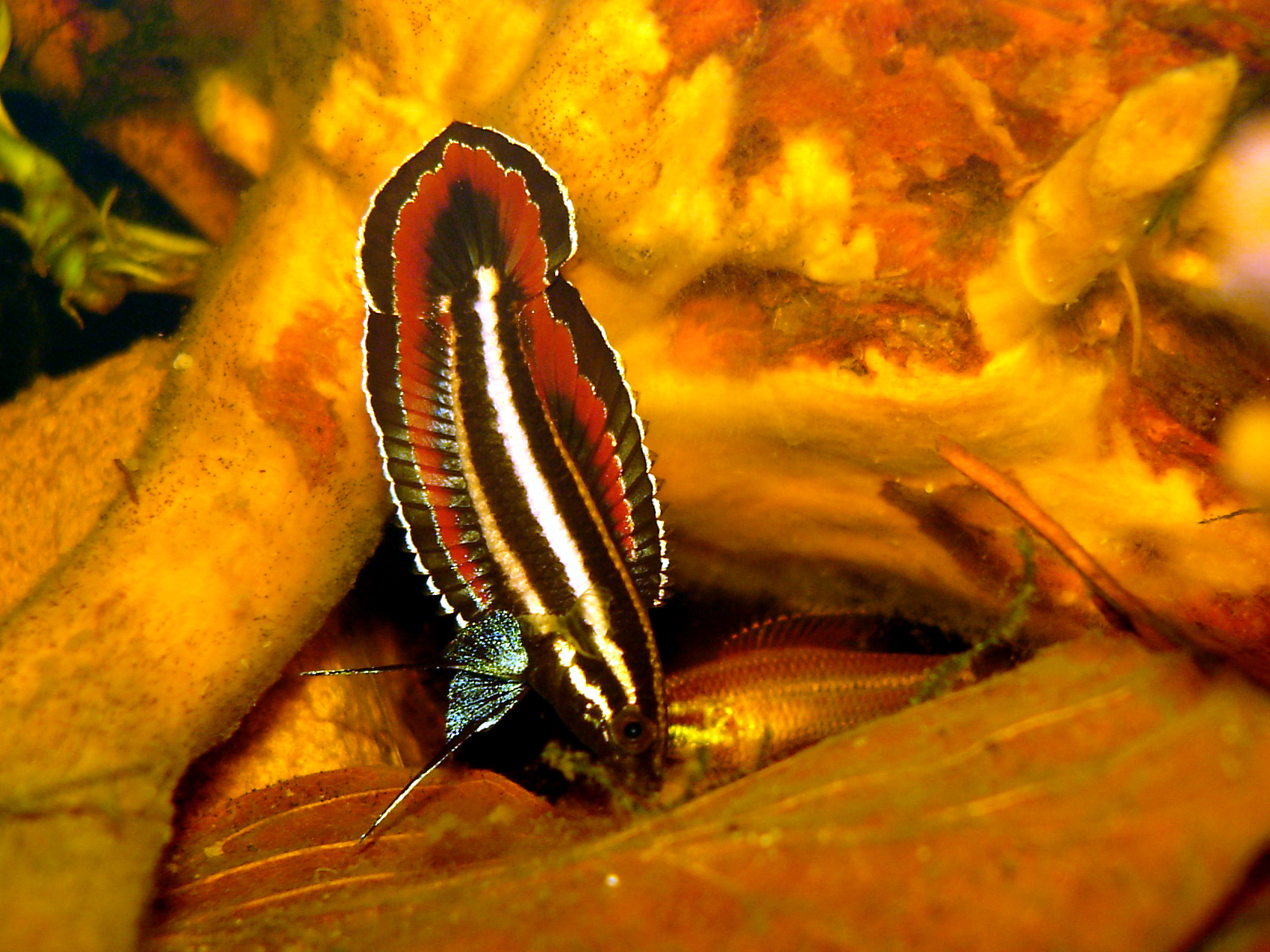
- P. phoenicurus

Scientific classification
- Kingdom: Animalia
- Phylum: Chordata
- Class: Actinopterygii
- Order: Anabantiformes
- Family: Osphronemidae
- Subfamily: Macropodusinae
- Genus: Parosphromenus; Bleeker, 1877

Type species
- Osphromenus deissneri Bleeker, 1859

= Parosphromenus =

Genus of fishes

Parosphromenus is a genus of gouramies native to freshwater in Southeast Asia. All species are highly specialized peat swamp inhabitants native to southeast Asia, and the males are usually brightly colored in breeding dress; however, their need for soft, acidic water and live food prohibits the genus from becoming popular aquarium fish.

== Conservation status ==
In the present day, almost all species of licorice gouramis are endangered. Aquarist-run programs exist to ensure the survival of the many species of licorice gouramis. Trade from specialist breeders is the only way to obtain these rare fish, and specimen must be monitored closely for a species census to check the total population.

== Species ==
The currently recognized species are:

- Parosphromenus alfredi Kottelat & P. K. L. Ng, 2005
- Parosphromenus allani B. Brown, 1987
- Parosphromenus anjunganensis Kottelat, 1991
- Parosphromenus barbarae Tan & Grinang, 2020
- Parosphromenus bintan Kottelat & P. K. L. Ng, 1998
- Parosphromenus deissneri (Bleeker, 1859) (licorice gourami)
- Parosphromenus filamentosus Vierke, 1981 (spiketail gourami)
- Parosphromenus gunawani I. Schindler & Linke, 2012
- Parosphromenus harveyi B. Brown, 1987
- Parosphromenus juelinae Shi, Guo, Haryono, Hong, & Zhang, 2021
- Parosphromenus kishii Shi, Guo, Haryono, Hong, & Zhang, 2021
- Parosphromenus linkei Kottelat, 1991
- Parosphromenus nagyi Schaller, 1985
- Parosphromenus opallios Kottelat & P. K. L. Ng, 2005
- Parosphromenus ornaticauda Kottelat, 1991
- Parosphromenus pahuensis Kottelat & P. K. L. Ng, 2005
- Parosphromenus paludicola Tweedie, 1952
- Parosphromenus parvulus Vierke, 1979
- Parosphromenus phoenicurus I. Schindler & Linke, 2012
- Parosphromenus quindecim Kottelat & P. K. L. Ng, 2005
- Parosphromenus rubrimontis Kottelat & P. K. L. Ng, 2005
- Parosphromenus sumatranus Klausewitz, 1955
- Parosphromenus tweediei Kottelat & P. K. L. Ng, 2005
