= Akysis variegatus =

Conservation status
- Data Deficient (IUCN 3.1)

Scientific classification
- Kingdom: Animalia
- Phylum: Chordata
- Class: Actinopterygii
- Order: Siluriformes
- Family: Akysidae
- Genus: Akysis
- Species: A. variegatus

Binomial name
- Akysis variegatus (Bleeker, 1846)

Species of fish

Akysis clavulus is a species of fish belonging to the family Akysidae. The fish is found in northern Borneo and the Mekong River.
