= Parakysis grandis =

Scientific classification
- Kingdom: Animalia
- Phylum: Chordata
- Class: Actinopterygii
- Order: Siluriformes
- Family: Akysidae
- Genus: Parakysis
- Species: P. grandis

Binomial name
- Parakysis grandis Ng & Lim, 1995

Species of fish

Parakysis grandis is a species of catfish of the family Akysidae. A detailed discussion of this species's relationship with the other member of its genus can be found at Parakysis.
