= Akysis microps =

Conservation status
- Data Deficient (IUCN 3.1)

Scientific classification
- Kingdom: Animalia
- Phylum: Chordata
- Class: Actinopterygii
- Order: Siluriformes
- Family: Akysidae
- Genus: Akysis
- Species: A. microps

Binomial name
- Akysis microps H. H. Ng & H. H. Tan, 1999

Species of fish

Akysis microps is a species of catfish belonging to the family Akysidae. The fish is endemic to Malaysia, specifically Johor. The length of Akysis microps is 2.9 centimeters SL (Standard Length) long. Akysis microps is found in large streams with sandy bottoms 50 centimeters deep.

== Status ==
As of 2019, the IUCN has listed Akysis microps as Data Deficient.
