= Parakysis verrucosus =

Scientific classification
- Kingdom: Animalia
- Phylum: Chordata
- Class: Actinopterygii
- Order: Siluriformes
- Family: Akysidae
- Genus: Parakysis
- Species: P. verrucosus

Binomial name
- Parakysis verrucosus Herre, 1940

Species of fish

Parakysis verrucosus is a species of catfish of the family Akysidae. A detailed discussion of this species's relationship with the other member of its genus can be found at Parakysis.
