= Akysis pulvinatus =

Conservation status
- Data Deficient (IUCN 3.1)

Scientific classification
- Kingdom: Animalia
- Phylum: Chordata
- Class: Actinopterygii
- Order: Siluriformes
- Family: Akysidae
- Genus: Akysis
- Species: A. pulvinatus

Binomial name
- Akysis pulvinatus H. H. Ng, 2007

Species of stream catfish

Akysis pulvinatus is a species of stream catfish. It is known only from the western half of the Kra Isthmus (i.e. in streams flowing into the Andaman Sea), in southern Thailand.

This is a small catfish, where none of the type specimens exceeding 30 mm standard length. Like most Akysis species. it is brown with yellowish patches but can be distinguished from its congeners by a combination of characters including a yellowish snout, an adipose fin with a long base, a relatively deep caudal peduncle and a forked caudal fin with the lower lobe longer than the upper. Not much is known about this species including the population, threats and conservation actions, except that it may be caught as a bycatch in artisanal fisheries.
