= Pseudobagarius meridionalis =

Scientific classification
- Domain: Eukaryota
- Kingdom: Animalia
- Phylum: Chordata
- Class: Actinopterygii
- Order: Siluriformes
- Family: Akysidae
- Genus: Pseudobagarius
- Species: P. meridionalis

Binomial name
- Pseudobagarius meridionalis (Ng & Siebert, 2004)

Synonyms
- Akysis meridionalis Ng & Siebert, 2004

Species of fish

Pseudobagarius meridionalis is a species of catfish belonging to the family Akysidae (the stream catfishes). It is only known from the Barito River basin in southern Borneo.

This is a very small catfish, up to 32 mm standard length, with a body dark brown above with a few scattered pale spots and white below, with a strongly projected upper jaw so that the premaxillary teeth are clearly visible even when the mouth is closed.
