= Parosphromenus pahuensis =

Conservation status
- Endangered (IUCN 3.1)

Scientific classification
- Kingdom: Animalia
- Phylum: Chordata
- Class: Actinopterygii
- Order: Anabantiformes
- Family: Osphronemidae
- Genus: Parosphromenus
- Species: P. pahuensis

Binomial name
- Parosphromenus pahuensis Kottelat & P. K. L. Ng, 2005

Species of fish

Parosphromenus pahuensis is a species of gourami. It is native to Asia, where it is known only from blackwater forested streams in the Kalimantan region of Indonesia. The species reaches 2.2 cm (0.9 in) in standard length and is known to be a facultative air-breather. Its specific epithet references the Muara Pahu district of East Kalimantan, which includes its type locality. It is sometimes kept as an aquarium fish, where it is commonly known as the Melak licorice gourami.
