= Akysis vespa =

Conservation status
- Data Deficient (IUCN 3.1)

Scientific classification
- Domain: Eukaryota
- Kingdom: Animalia
- Phylum: Chordata
- Class: Actinopterygii
- Order: Siluriformes
- Family: Akysidae
- Genus: Akysis
- Species: A. vespa

Binomial name
- Akysis vespa H. H. Ng & Kottelat, 2004

Species of fish

Akysis vespa is a species of fish in the family Akysidae, the stream catfishes. It is endemic to Burma, where it occurs in the Ataran River drainage. This species was described to science in 2004.

This fish reaches up to about 3.1 centimeters in maximum length. The species name vespa ("wasp") refers to its pattern of yellow-orange and brown stripes and the sting it can inflict with its spines.

Little is known about the biology of the species. It is sometimes collected for ornamental use in aquaria.
