= Akysis recavus =

Conservation status
- Data Deficient (IUCN 3.1)

Scientific classification
- Domain: Eukaryota
- Kingdom: Animalia
- Phylum: Chordata
- Class: Actinopterygii
- Order: Siluriformes
- Family: Akysidae
- Genus: Akysis
- Species: A. recavus

Binomial name
- Akysis recavus H. H. Ng & Kottelat, 1998

Species of fish

Akysis recavus is a species of fish in the family Akysidae, the stream catfishes. It is native to Thailand, where it occurs in the Chao Phraya River. It has also been reported from the Mekong basin in Laos.

Akysis recavus is a small catfish, reaching 4 cm (1.6 inches) in standard length.

This fish was described to science by H. H. Ng and M. Kottelat in 1998. Little is known about the biology of the species.
