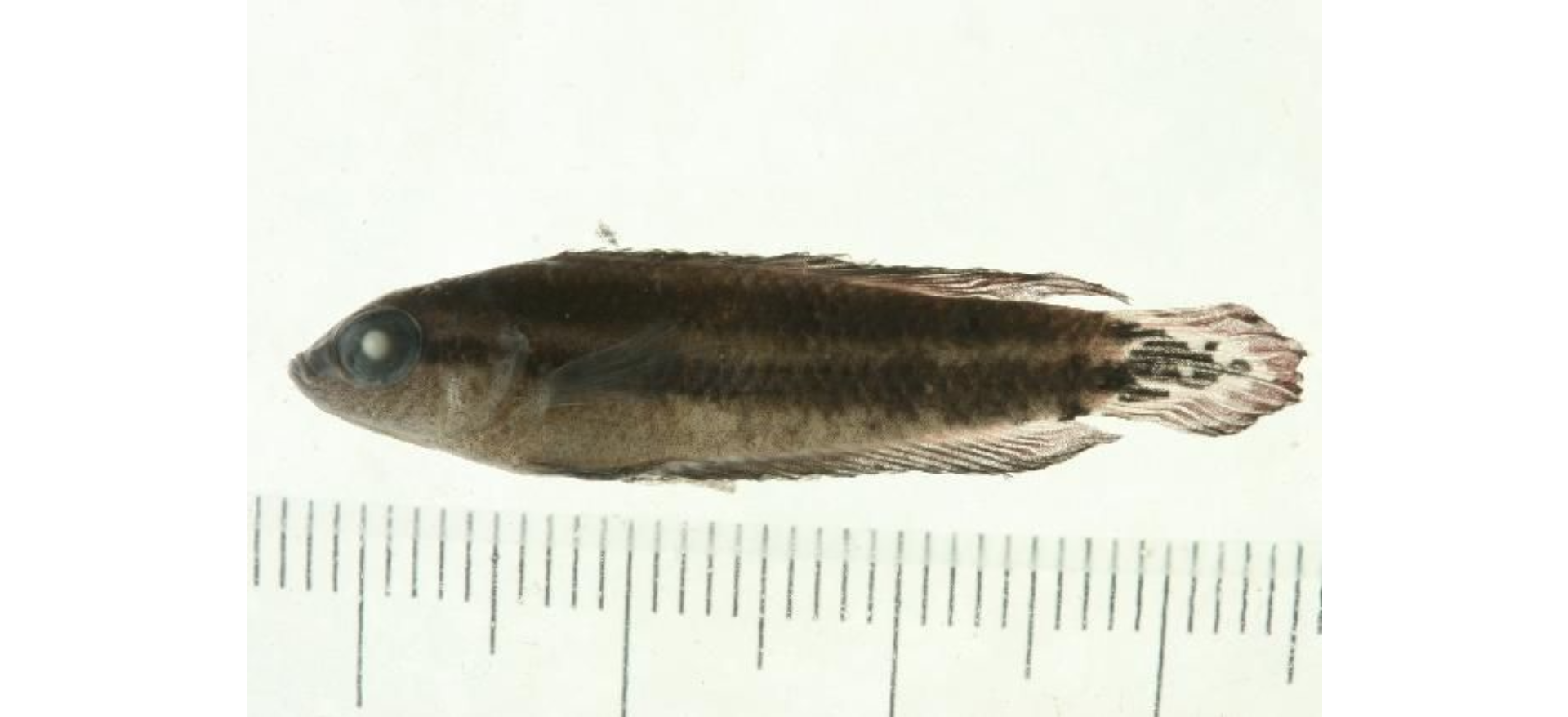

Conservation status
- Critically Endangered (IUCN 3.1)

Scientific classification
- Kingdom: Animalia
- Phylum: Chordata
- Class: Actinopterygii
- Order: Anabantiformes
- Family: Osphronemidae
- Genus: Parosphromenus
- Species: P. quindecim

Binomial name
- Parosphromenus quindecim Kottelat & P. K. L. Ng, 2005

= Parosphromenus quindecim =

Species of fish

Parosphromenus quindecim is a species of gourami. It is native to Asia, where it is known only from the Pawan River basin in Indonesia. The species reaches 2.9 cm (1.1 in) in standard length and is known to be a facultative air-breather. Its specific epithet is derived from the Latin word for the number fifteen, referencing the number of dorsal fin spines, which is distinct from other species in the genus. Although present in the aquarium trade, it is noted to be uncommon.
