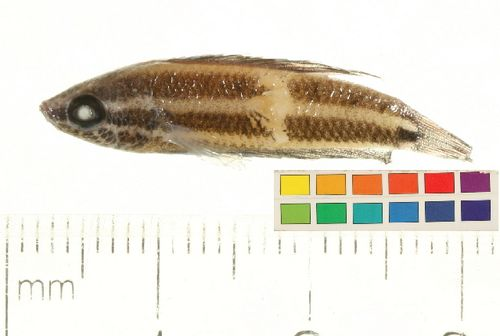

Conservation status
- Endangered (IUCN 3.1)

Scientific classification
- Kingdom: Animalia
- Phylum: Chordata
- Class: Actinopterygii
- Order: Anabantiformes
- Family: Osphronemidae
- Genus: Parosphromenus
- Species: P. rubrimontis

Binomial name
- Parosphromenus rubrimontis Kottelat & P. K. L. Ng, 2005

= Parosphromenus rubrimontis =

Species of fish

Parosphromenus rubrimontis is a species of gourami. It is native to Asia, where it is known only from Malaysia. The species reaches 2.5 cm (1 in) in standard length and is known to be a facultative air-breather. Its specific epithet is derived from Latin and translates to "red mountain", referencing the town of Bukit Merah (in the state of Perak and located near the species' type locality), the name of which has the same approximate meaning. The species sometimes appears in the aquarium trade, where it is commonly known as the red-finned licorice gourami.
