= Akysis clavulus =

Conservation status
- Data Deficient (IUCN 3.1)

Scientific classification
- Kingdom: Animalia
- Phylum: Chordata
- Class: Actinopterygii
- Order: Siluriformes
- Family: Akysidae
- Genus: Akysis
- Species: A. clavulus

Binomial name
- Akysis clavulus H. H. Ng & Freyhof, 2003

Species of fish

Akysis clavulus is a species of catfish belonging to the family Akysidae. The fish is endemic to Vietnam. The fish is able to grow up to 3.5 centimeters (SL).

== Status ==
As of 2012, the IUCN has listed Akysis clavulus as data deficient.
