= Akysis longifilis =

Scientific classification
- Domain: Eukaryota
- Kingdom: Animalia
- Phylum: Chordata
- Class: Actinopterygii
- Order: Siluriformes
- Family: Akysidae
- Genus: Akysis
- Species: A. longifilis

Binomial name
- Akysis longifilis H. H. Ng, 2006

Species of fish

Akysis longifilis is a species of catfish belonging to the family Akysidae, the stream catfishes. It is only known to inhabit the Sittang River basin in southern Myanmar.

As a small catfish, it is up to 55 mm (2.2 in) standard length, with a dark brown body marked with yellowish saddle-shaped markings, very long barbels, and a forked caudal fin.
