= Parakysis anomalopteryx =

Scientific classification
- Kingdom: Animalia
- Phylum: Chordata
- Class: Actinopterygii
- Order: Siluriformes
- Family: Akysidae
- Genus: Parakysis
- Species: P. anomalopteryx

Binomial name
- Parakysis anomalopteryx Roberts, 1989

Species of fish

Parakysis anomalopteryx is a species of catfish of the family Akysidae. A detailed discussion of this species's relationship with the other five members of its genus can be found at Parakysis.
