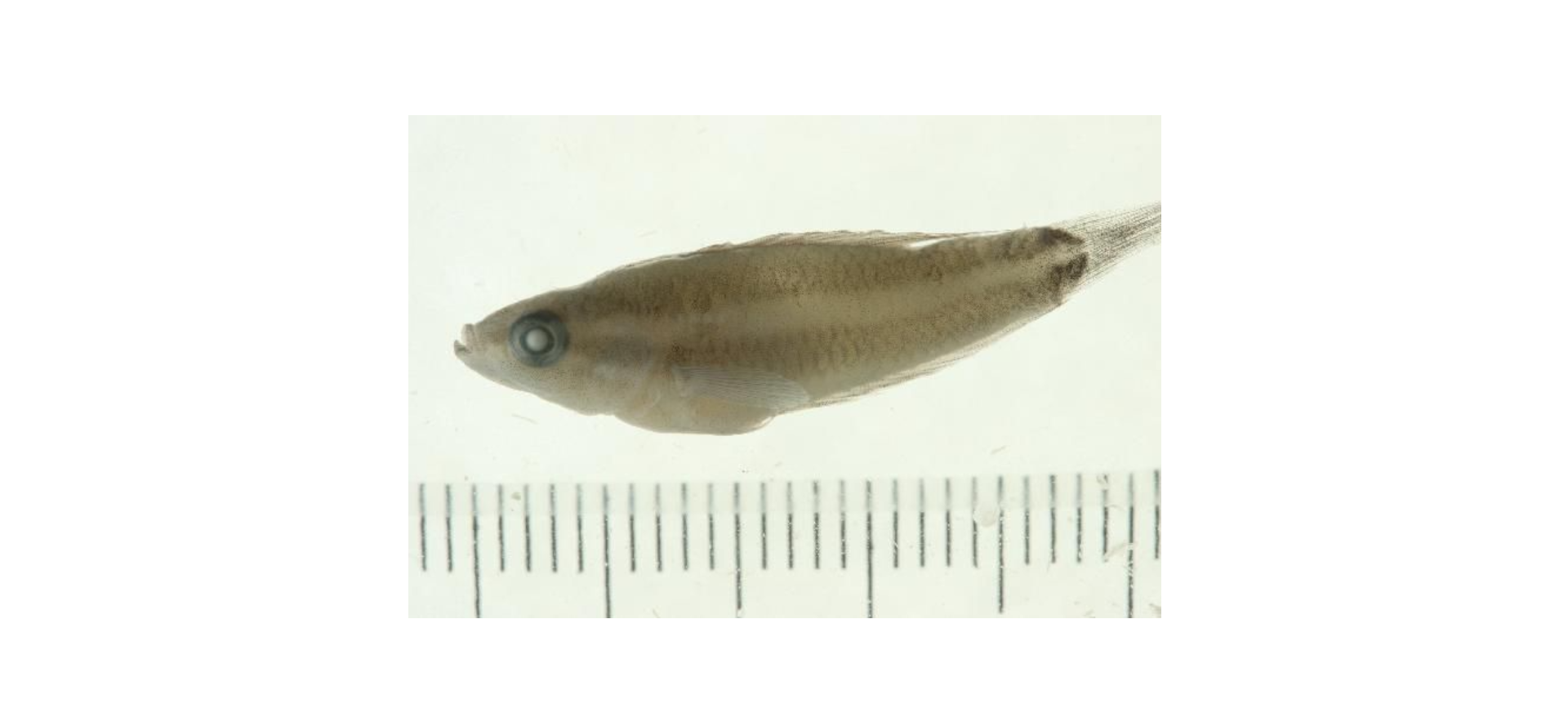

Conservation status
- Endangered (IUCN 3.1)

Scientific classification
- Kingdom: Animalia
- Phylum: Chordata
- Class: Actinopterygii
- Order: Anabantiformes
- Family: Osphronemidae
- Genus: Parosphromenus
- Species: P. opallios

Binomial name
- Parosphromenus opallios Kottelat & P. K. L. Ng, 2005

= Parosphromenus opallios =

Species of fish

Parosphromenus opallios is a species of gourami. It is native to Asia, where it is known only from the Kalimantan region of Indonesia. The species reaches 2.5 cm (1.0 in) in standard length and is known to be a facultative air-breather. Its specific epithet is derived from Greek and references the gemstone opal. Although present in the aquarium trade, it is noted to be uncommon.
