= Parakysis notialis =

Scientific classification
- Domain: Eukaryota
- Kingdom: Animalia
- Phylum: Chordata
- Class: Actinopterygii
- Order: Siluriformes
- Family: Akysidae
- Genus: Parakysis
- Species: P. notialis

Binomial name
- Parakysis notialis Ng & Kottelat, 2003

Species of fish

Parakysis notialis is a species of catfish of the family Akysidae. It was described in 2003. A detailed discussion of this species's relationship with the other five members of its genus can be found at Parakysis.
