= Acrochordonichthys gyrinus =

Conservation status
- Data Deficient (IUCN 3.1)

Scientific classification
- Domain: Eukaryota
- Kingdom: Animalia
- Phylum: Chordata
- Class: Actinopterygii
- Order: Siluriformes
- Family: Akysidae
- Genus: Acrochordonichthys
- Species: A. gyrinus

Binomial name
- Acrochordonichthys gyrinus Vidthayanon & Ng, 2003

Species of catfish

Acrochordonichthys gyrinus, the Falcate chameleon catfish, is a species of catfish of the family Akysidae. A detailed discussion of this species's relationship with the other members of its genus can be found on Acrochordonichthys.

This species is endemic to Thailand and is only known from the Yom River in the upper Chao Phraya River drainage. It is known to live in tropical, freshwater areas.
