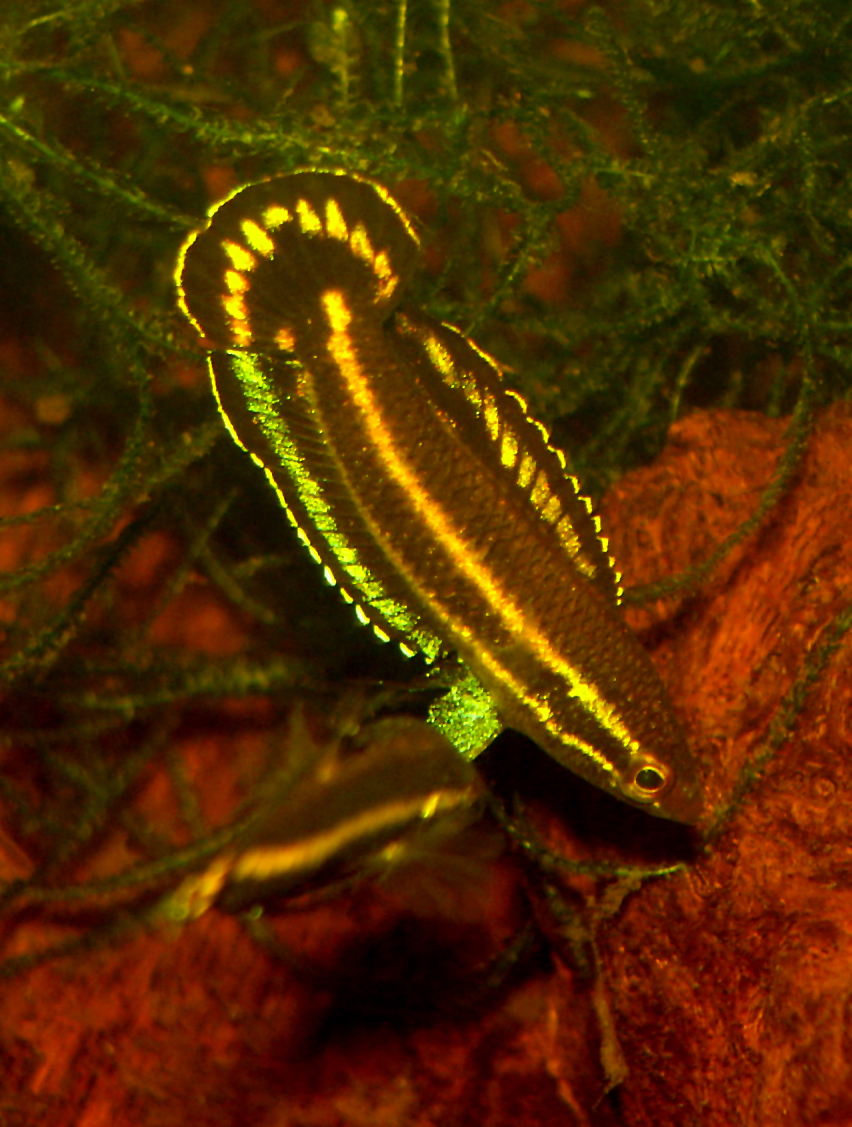

Conservation status
- Endangered (IUCN 3.1)

Scientific classification
- Kingdom: Animalia
- Phylum: Chordata
- Class: Actinopterygii
- Order: Anabantiformes
- Family: Osphronemidae
- Genus: Parosphromenus
- Species: P. harveyi

Binomial name
- Parosphromenus harveyi B. Brown, 1987
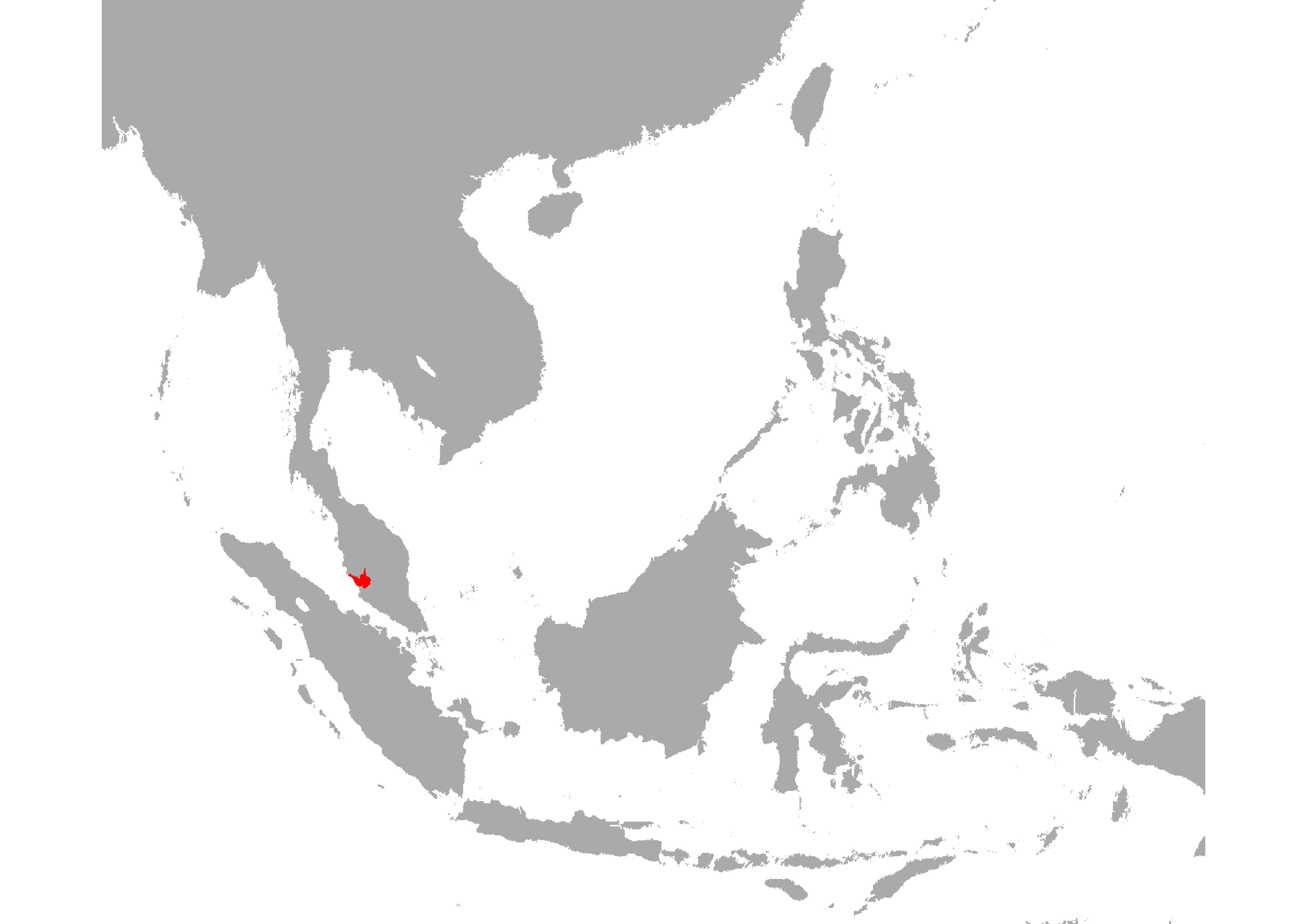

= Parosphromenus harveyi =

Species of freshwater fish

Parosphromenus harveyi is a species of gourami endemic to Malaysia, where it is known from Selangor. The most extreme freshwater habitats in Peninsular Malaysia are the peat swamp forests that consist of dark-coloured, highly acidic waters. Parosphromenus harveyi, commonly referred to as a "licorice gourami" alongside its congeners, is a small labyrinth fish native to peat swamp forests in the Tanjong Malim area within the state of Perak, with populations of the species exhibiting a wide variety of morphological and behavioural traits. Species of the genus Parosphromenus, usually less than 3.0 cm (1.2 in) in standard length, are stenotypic inhabitants of peat swamp forests and associated blackwater streams with limited light penetration. The species was described by Barbara Brown in 1987, alongside its congener P. allani. Since the 1950s, additional species in the genus have been described on a sporadic basis and there are 23 recognised members at present.

== Etymology ==
The generic name is a compound of para meaning "near", "similar to" and Osphronemus, a name coined by Philibert Commerson meaning "olfactory", a reference to its labyrinth organ, which Commerson thought was an olfactory organ. The person honoured in the specific name is thought to be the German born aquarist Will Harvey (1916-2013) who settled in Scotland after World War II and whose obituary Brown wrote.

== Discovery and importation ==
The initial discovery and importation of the species into Europe took place in 1984 and 1985, prior to its official description.

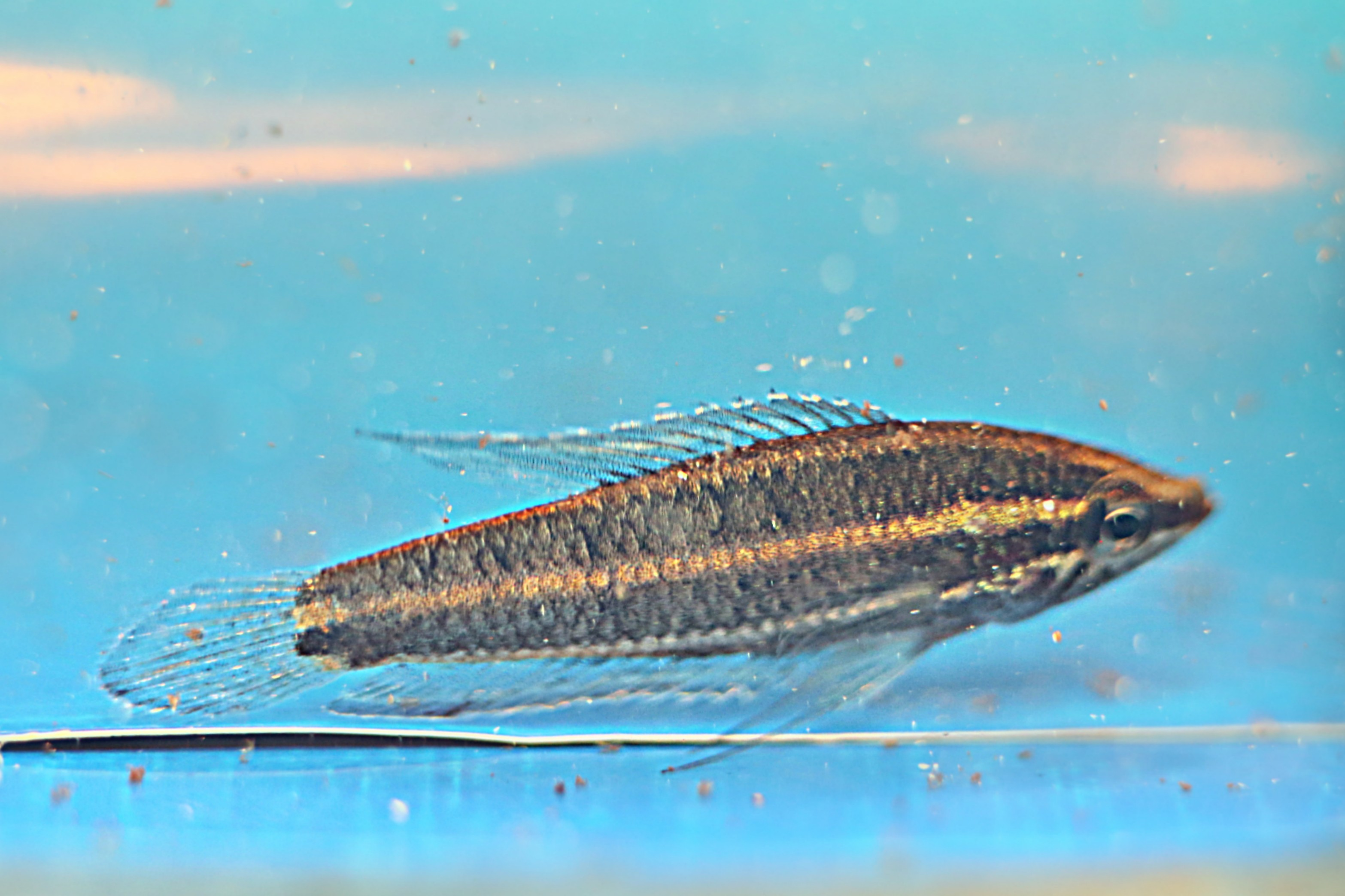
Source: Zoo Negara Malaysia

== Common names ==
In Finnish, the species is known as "turkoosigurami". It is also known, somewhat ambiguously, as the "ornate paradisefish" (not to be confused with Malpulutta kretseri) and Harvey's licorice gourami.

== Physical description ==
The species is characterized by 11 to 13 dorsal spines, 5 to 7 dorsal soft rays, 11 to 13 anal spines, and 8 to 11 anal soft rays. It is typically around 3.0 to 3.5 cm (1.2 to 1.4 in) in length, with an elongated body and a round caudal fin. In nuptial colouration, the male is distinguished from most of the other round-tailed Parosphromenus species (with the exception of the P. bintan complex) by the absence of any red portions in its colour and its striking iridescent blue-green luminescent bands on the unpaired fins. Another characteristic for this species is also the black band at the edge of its caudal fin that is wider than in most similar types. The differentiation of the female from the other round-tailed species is noted to be problematic. During courtship, the female adopts the species-typical pale colour while the otherwise glass-clear transparent unpaired fins take on a brownish colour.

== Ecology and habitat ==
Parosphromenus harveyi is a tropical, freshwater, pelagic, non-migratory fish and a known inhabitant of peat swamp forests and associated blackwater streams. It typically occurs at a depth of 0.3 to 1.6 m (1.0 to 5.2 ft), although this fluctuates based on rainfall.

== Distribution ==
The species is native to Asia, occurring in Selangor and the vicinity of Tanjong Malim in Perak in Malaysia. This region is considered to be part of the Indomalayan biogeographic realm. The species has been recorded from peat swamp forests and blackwater streams in northern Selangor, along the on-trunk road between Kampung Sungai Besar and Tanjung Malim, and in wetlands near Batu Arang - an ecosystem that is now largely destroyed. The species still exists in suitable remnants of marshes of the formerly large jungle of Selangor about 100 km (62 mi) north of Batu Arang.

== Mating ==
Mating behaviour of the true Parosphromenus harveyi is characterized by distinctive "head-down" courtship. Compatible pairs mate, spawn and care for broods almost continuously if the conditions are suitable, with medium-sized clutches of eggs. Many males seen in August and September are in full breeding colouration, suggesting that there is likely a greater incidence of breeding in this species during low water.

== Reproduction ==
Parosphromenus spp. have been grouped arbitrarily based on courtship behaviour in males which adopt a "head-down", "head-up", or "horizontal" position depending on species. The species normally spawns in small caves or among leaf litter, forming temporary pair bonds with the male solely responsible for egg and brood-care. P. harveyi belongs to the former, more speciose, assemblage, in which the male assumes a near-vertical position with the head lowered and fins splayed during nuptial displays. Sexually-active males form small territories, at the centre of which is a small cave normally formed from leaf litter in natural settings, with males then attempting to attract females in the vicinity to enter the cave via courtship displays. Eggs and milt are released in batches during a series of embraces in which the male wraps its body around that of the female. Some males construct a rudimentary bubble nest inside the cave while others do not, but both males and females attempt to attach the eggs to the ceiling after they are released. Subsequent spawning embraces may dislodge eggs from the roof of the cave, and inexperienced adults sometimes simply eat them, so a degree of patience may be required until the fish successfully reproduce in captivity. Following a successful spawn, the female leaves the cave and proceeds to defend the surrounding area while the male tends to the brood. Incubation is normally 24–36 hours with fry mobile around 4–6 days later. They initially swim without direction and the male will collect and return them to the 'nest' but, after 3–5 additional days, they are fully free-swimming and leave the cave at which point parental care ceases.

== Diet ==
In captivity, this particular species eats live food such as mosquito larvae, grindal worm, Daphnia, benthic copepods, ostracods, and other annelids. According to observations of captured P. harveyi, this fish only eats live food and most of the dried food items given were refused. This species is chiefly a micropredator feeding on tiny aquatic invertebrates, therefore, in an aquarium setting, it must be offered a variety of small live foods such as Artemia nauplii, Daphnia, Moina, mosquito larvae, microworms, etc. Frozen foods are sometimes accepted but not considered sufficiently nutritious, while the majority of dried products are normally refused.

== Care and breeding ==
This species is very sensitive to the air. They cannot be exposed to the air directly (which may occur during transportation) because the surface of their body will get scalded. The requirements for breeding pairs are that the tank must be at least 25.4 cm (10 in), with the addition of some dried leaves and hidden pipes for their hiding places. Water changing is recommended to be done at around 10–20%, or once every one or two weeks.

Water conditions should include a temperature between 22 and 28 °C (72 and 82 °F), a pH between 3.0 and 3.8, a conductivity of less than 100 microSiemens/cm, and a carbonate hardness that is not detectable. Clutches often have more than 40 eggs, and they are laid in a foam nest usually consisting of only a few bubbles. This species is not recommended for beginners.

== Economic and ecological value ==
P. harveyi is an important component of the ichthyofauna in blackwater streams and peat swamps. It is also considered a desirable candidate for the aquarium trade due to its rarity and conventionally appealing appearance, despite its endangered status. The international trade of endangered species such as P. harveyi could reportedly raise awareness of their conservation concerns. The species is harmless to humans.

== Conservation threats ==
Due to the type locality becoming dried up and deforested, the species appears to have adjourned into the formerly extended nature protection area known as the "Selangor Forest". Despite its protected status, this area too has been drained in large parts and has partially been converted to plantation land. P. harveyi still occurs in some drainage canals and in remaining blackwater streams of the relict jungle.

== Aquarium trade ==
The species appeared very rarely in trade prior to the destruction of its habitat, and appears even less frequently now. Most of the fish distributed among hobbyists can be traced back to a few private imports. Because of the risk of confusion with the frequently traded specie of the P. bintan group (spec. "blue line", etc.), fish labelled as "P. harveyi" should be examined more closely. On the other hand, genuine P. harveyi may have been traded under the incorrect appellation "P. deissneri", possibly due to captive breeding in the hobby.

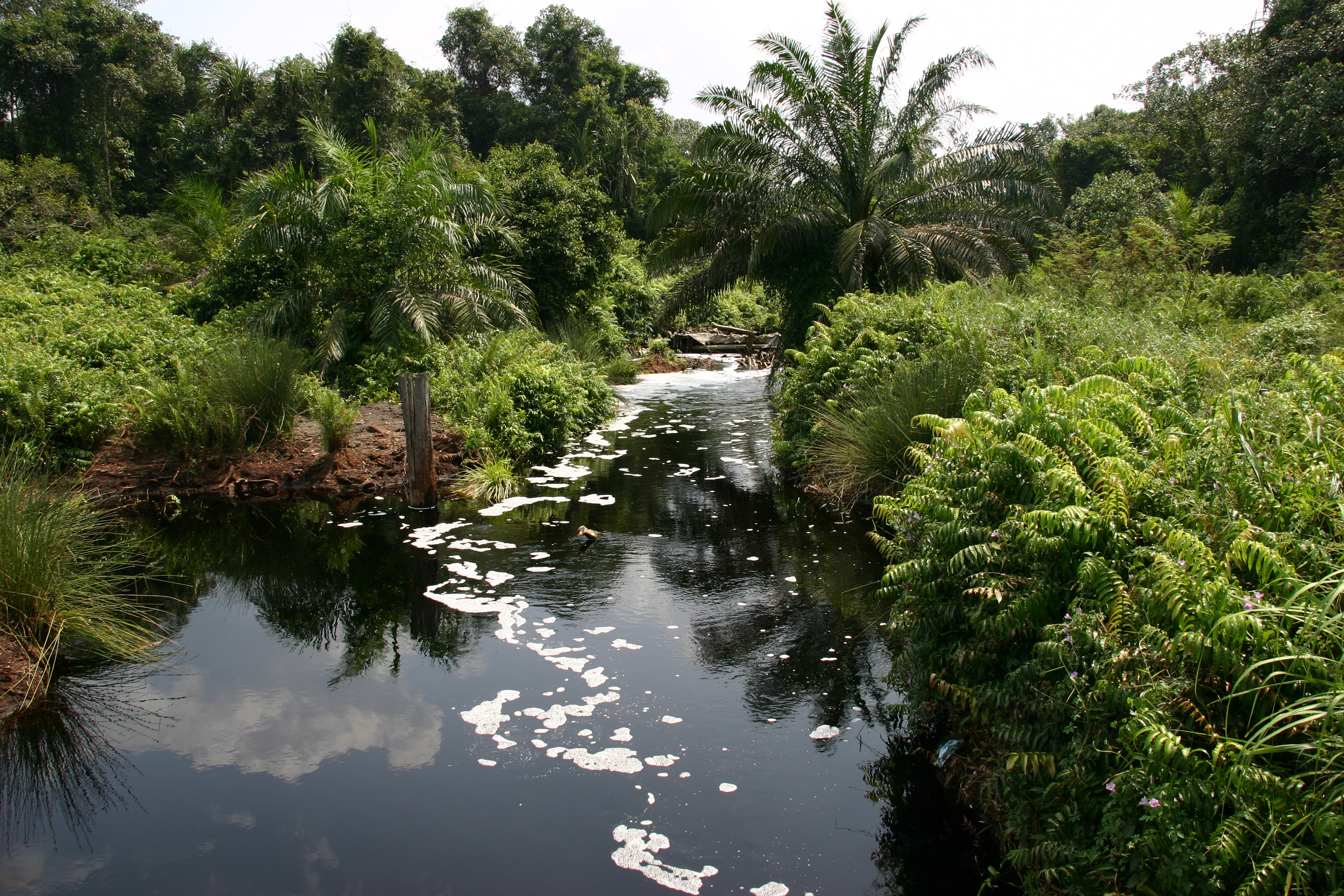
Blackwater habitats can be found in peat swamp forests, such as those found in North Selangor, Malaysia.
