= Akysis bilustris =

Conservation status
- Data Deficient (IUCN 3.1)

Scientific classification
- Kingdom: Animalia
- Phylum: Chordata
- Class: Actinopterygii
- Order: Siluriformes
- Family: Akysidae
- Genus: Akysis
- Species: A. bilustris

Binomial name
- Akysis bilustris H. H. Ng, 2011

Species of fish

Akysis bilustris is a species of catfish belonging to the family Akysidae (the stream catfishes), known only from two geographically proximate localities in the Xe Kong drainage, a major subdrainage of the Mekong River, in Laos and Cambodia. This species grows to a length of 2.57 centimetres (1.01 in) SL.

== Habitat and ecology ==
A. bilustris occurs in streams and rivers, on sandy to muddy substrates with submerged vegetation and/or debris.

== Relationship to humans ==
A. bilustris is a component of local subsistence fisheries.
