= Acrochordonichthys ischnosoma =

Scientific classification
- Kingdom: Animalia
- Phylum: Chordata
- Class: Actinopterygii
- Order: Siluriformes
- Family: Akysidae
- Genus: Acrochordonichthys
- Species: A. ischnosoma

Binomial name
- Acrochordonichthys ischnosoma Bleeker, 1858

Species of fish

Acrochordonichthys ischnosoma is a species of catfish of the family Akysidae. A detailed discussion of this species's relationship with the other members of its genus can be found on Acrochordonichthys. A. ischnosoma is known from the Citarum River drainage in western Java and the Musi River drainage in southern Sumatra.
