= Parakysis longirostris =

Conservation status
- Near Threatened (IUCN 3.1)

Scientific classification
- Kingdom: Animalia
- Phylum: Chordata
- Class: Actinopterygii
- Order: Siluriformes
- Family: Akysidae
- Genus: Parakysis
- Species: P. longirostris

Binomial name
- Parakysis longirostris Ng & Lim, 1995

Species of fish

Parakysis longirostris is a species of catfish of the family Akysidae. It goes under common names longnose little warty catfish and Singapore little warty catfish. It is found in the south end of the Malay Peninsula (Malaysia, Singapore) and Bintan Island, Indonesia. A detailed discussion of this species's relationship with the other member of its genus can be found at Parakysis.
