= Breitensteinia insignis =

Scientific classification
- Kingdom: Animalia
- Phylum: Chordata
- Class: Actinopterygii
- Order: Siluriformes
- Family: Akysidae
- Genus: Breitensteinia
- Species: B. insignis

Binomial name
- Breitensteinia insignis Steindachner, 1881

Species of fish

Breitensteinia insignis is a species of catfish of the family Akysidae. A detailed discussion of this species's relationship with the other species in the genus can be found at Breitensteinia.
