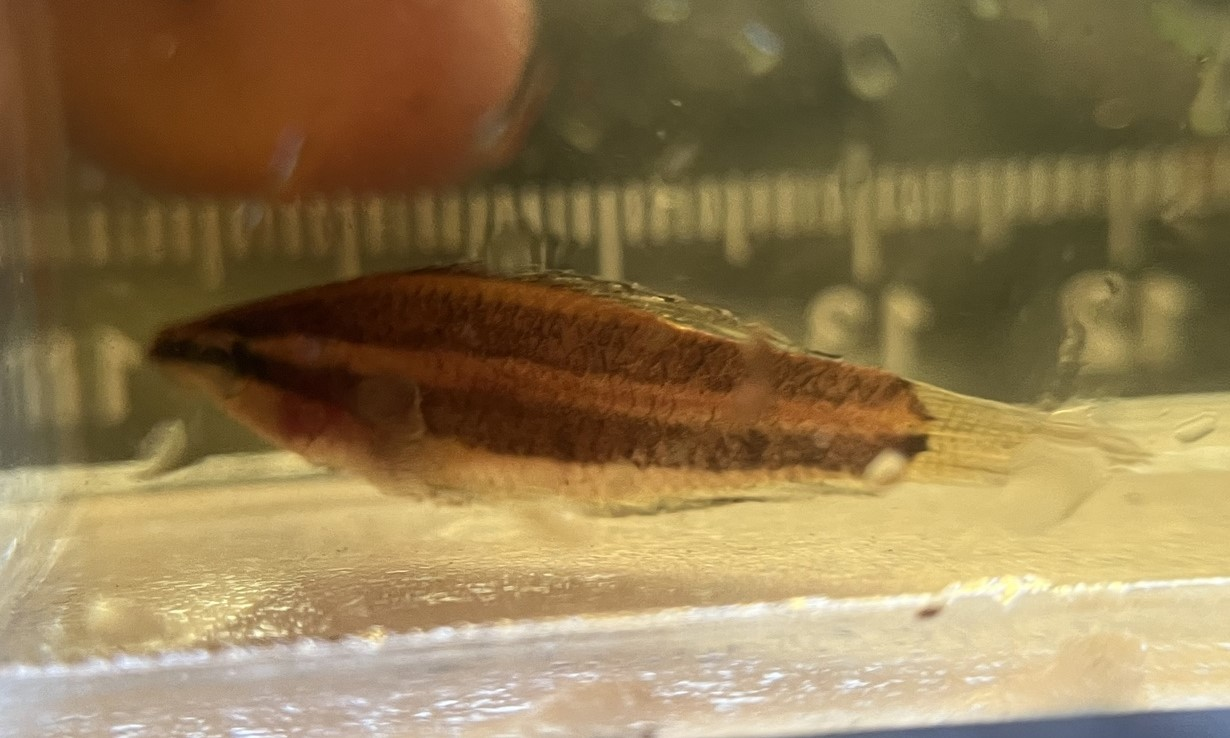

Conservation status
- Vulnerable (IUCN 3.1)

Scientific classification
- Kingdom: Animalia
- Phylum: Chordata
- Class: Actinopterygii
- Order: Anabantiformes
- Family: Osphronemidae
- Genus: Parosphromenus
- Species: P. nagyi

Binomial name
- Parosphromenus nagyi Schaller, 1985

= Parosphromenus nagyi =

Species of fish

Parosphromenus nagyi is a species of gourami. It is native to Asia, where it is known only from the vicinity of Kuantan District in the state of Pahang in Malaysia.

It is typically found in the deeper portions of creeks flowing through peat swamp forests. The species reaches 4.0 cm (1.6 in) in total length and is known to be a facultative air-breather. During reproduction, males use atmospheric air to construct bubble nests in caves.

Its specific epithet honors the Austrian aquarist Peter Nagy, who first imported the species to Europe after collecting it in its native range.

The species sometimes occurs in the aquarium trade, where it is commonly known as the strawberry licorice gourami.
