= Parakysis =

Scientific classification
- Kingdom: Animalia
- Phylum: Chordata
- Class: Actinopterygii
- Division: Teleostei
- Order: Siluriformes
- Family: Akysidae
- Subfamily: Parakysinae
- Genus: Parakysis; Herre, 1940

Type species
- Parakysis verrucosa Herre, 1940

Genus of fishes

Parakysis is a genus of catfishes (order Siluriformes) of the family Akysidae. It includes six species.

== Distribution ==
Parakysis species are found in small forest streams of Sundaic Southeast Asia. P. anomalopteryx originates from the Kapuas River basin in western Borneo. P. grandis inhabits the Kapuas and Kuching River basins in Borneo and Deli, Indragiri, and Batang Hari basins in Sumatra. P. longirostris is distributed in Singapore, Peninsular Malaysia, and the Riau Archipelago. P. verrucosus is known from Peninsular Malaysia and the Riau Archipelago. The discovery of P. notialis in 2003 expanded the known range of Parakysis species to the Barito River basin in southern Borneo.

== Description ==
They are cryptically colored fishes that have a highly rugose skin with tubercles all over the body, branched mandibular barbels, a long, low adipose ridge, and a forked caudal fin. Parakysis species characteristically have pigmented tubercles and lateral lobes of the lower lip. They are also distinguished from Akysis by well-developed barbels, absence of teeth on the palatine, non-serrated pectoral and dorsal spines, and the apparent absent of the lateral line. They range in size from 2.0–6.2 centimetres (.8–2.4 in) SL.

== Ecology ==
P. anomalopteryx is found in small forest streams. P. longirostris is nocturnal and occurs in clumps of vegetation in streams with flowing waters. It is sympatric with P. verrucosus. P. verrucosus is found in primary peat streams with dense litter falls.

== Species ==
- Parakysis anomalopteryx Roberts, 1989
- Parakysis grandis Ng & Lim, 1995
- Parakysis hystriculus Ng, 2009
- Parakysis longirostris Ng & Lim, 1995 (Longnose little warty catfish)
- Parakysis notialis Ng & Kottelat, 2003
- Parakysis verrucosus Herre, 1940
