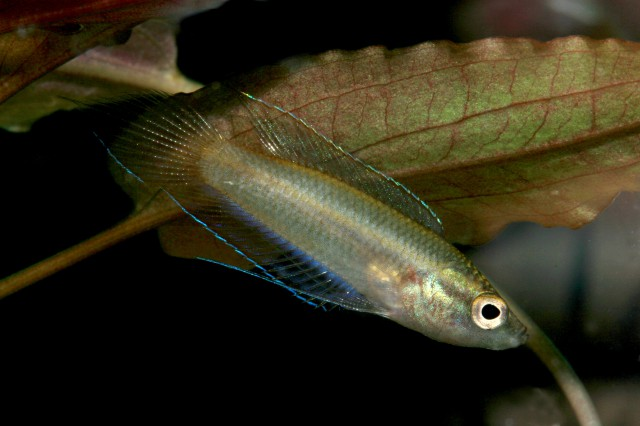

Conservation status
- Endangered (IUCN 3.1)

Scientific classification
- Kingdom: Animalia
- Phylum: Chordata
- Class: Actinopterygii
- Order: Anabantiformes
- Family: Osphronemidae
- Genus: Parosphromenus
- Species: P. paludicola

Binomial name
- Parosphromenus paludicola Tweedie, 1952

= Parosphromenus paludicola =

Species of fish

Parosphromenus paludicola is a species of gourami. It is native to Asia, where it ranges from the eastern Malay Peninsula northwards into southern Thailand. The species reaches 3.7 cm (1.5 in) in total length and is known to be a facultative air-breather. It is typically found in small creeks in swamp forests with a pH of less than 5.5 and a temperature between 25 and 27 °C (77 and 81 °F). The species reproduces by laying eggs that sink to the substrate and are then collected by one or both parents and embedded in a bubble nest. It sometimes appears in the aquarium trade, where it is commonly known as the swamp licorice gourami.
