= Pseudobagarius =

Scientific classification
- Kingdom: Animalia
- Phylum: Chordata
- Class: Actinopterygii
- Order: Siluriformes
- Family: Akysidae
- Subfamily: Akysinae
- Genus: Pseudobagarius; Ferraris, 2007

Type species
- Akysis pseudobagarius Roberts, 1989

Genus of fishes

Pseudobagarius is a genus of catfishes (order Siluriformes) of the family Akysidae.

== Taxonomy ==
Pseudobagarius includes species that were originally part of the pseudobagarius group of the genus Akysis. This group was first recognized in 1998; the authors recognized it as conceivable that this group and the Akysis variegatus represented two genera, but tentatively retained the species in a single genus. The genus was erected for these species in 2007.

== Distribution and habitat ==
Pseudobagarius species are from Southeast Asia, including Borneo, Cambodia, China, Laos, Thailand, and Vietnam. Pseudobagarius species typically inhabit clear, swiftly flowing upland streams with sandy or rocky substrates. However, P. similis is known to occur in brackish water.

== Description ==
Pseudobagarius species are akysids with the snout extending well anterior of the margin of lower jaw (which renders the mouth subterminal), the anterior and posterior nostrils relatively large and closely set (separated only by the base of the nasal barbel), and the caudal fin deeply forked.

== Species ==
- Pseudobagarius alfredi (H. H. Ng & Kottelat, 1998)
- Pseudobagarius baramensis (Fowler, 1905)
- Pseudobagarius filifer (H. H. Ng & Rainboth, 2005)
- Pseudobagarius fuscus (H. H. Ng & Kottelat, 1996)
- Pseudobagarius hardmani (H. H. Ng & Sabaj Pérez, 2005)
- Pseudobagarius inermis (H. H. Ng & Kottelat, 2000)
- Pseudobagarius leucorhynchus (Fowler, 1934)
- Pseudobagarius macronemus (Bleeker, 1860)
- Pseudobagarius meridionalis (H. H. Ng & Siebert, 2004)
- Pseudobagarius nitidus (H. H. Ng & Rainboth, 2005)
- Pseudobagarius pseudobagarius (Roberts, 1989)
- Pseudobagarius similis (H. H. Ng & Kottelat, 1998)
- Pseudobagarius sinensis (He, 1981)
- Pseudobagarius subtilis (H. H. Ng & Kottelat, 1998)
