= Acrochordonichthys chamaeleon =

Conservation status
- Data Deficient (IUCN 3.1)

Scientific classification
- Kingdom: Animalia
- Phylum: Chordata
- Class: Actinopterygii
- Order: Siluriformes
- Family: Akysidae
- Genus: Acrochordonichthys
- Species: A. chamaeleon

Binomial name
- Acrochordonichthys chamaeleon (Vaillant, 1902)

Species of fish

Acrochordonichthys chamaeleon is a species of catfish of the family Akysidae.

This species is endemic to Indonesia and is only known from the Kapuas River drainage, West Kalimantan (Borneo).
