= Parosphromenus filamentosus =

Conservation status
- Endangered (IUCN 3.1)

Scientific classification
- Kingdom: Animalia
- Phylum: Chordata
- Class: Actinopterygii
- Order: Anabantiformes
- Family: Osphronemidae
- Genus: Parosphromenus
- Species: P. filamentosus

Binomial name
- Parosphromenus filamentosus Vierke, 1981

Species of fish

Parosphromenus filamentosus, also known as the spiketail gourami or the filament licorice gourami, is a species of gourami. It is native to Asia, where it is known only from freshwater habitats in southeastern Borneo. The species reaches 4.0 cm (1.6 in) in standard length and is known to be a facultative air-breather. During reproduction, males of the species construct bubble nests.
