= Parosphromenus parvulus =

Conservation status
- Vulnerable (IUCN 3.1)

Scientific classification
- Kingdom: Animalia
- Phylum: Chordata
- Class: Actinopterygii
- Order: Anabantiformes
- Family: Osphronemidae
- Genus: Parosphromenus
- Species: P. parvulus

Binomial name
- Parosphromenus parvulus Vierke, 1979

Species of fish

Parosphromenus parvulus is a species of gourami. It is native to Asia, where it is known only from Indonesia. It is typically found in heavily vegetated acidic creeks along rainforest edges. The species reaches 2.7 cm (1.1 in) in total length and is known to be a facultative air-breather. It sometimes appears in the aquarium trade, where it is commonly known as the cherry-spotted pygmy licorice gourami.
