= Acrochordonichthys pachyderma =

Scientific classification
- Kingdom: Animalia
- Phylum: Chordata
- Class: Actinopterygii
- Order: Siluriformes
- Family: Akysidae
- Genus: Acrochordonichthys
- Species: A. pachyderma

Binomial name
- Acrochordonichthys pachyderma Vaillant, 1902

Species of fish

Acrochordonichthys pachyderma is a species of catfish of the family Akysidae. It is found in Borneo. A detailed discussion of this species's relationship with the other members of its genus can be found on Acrochordonichthys.
