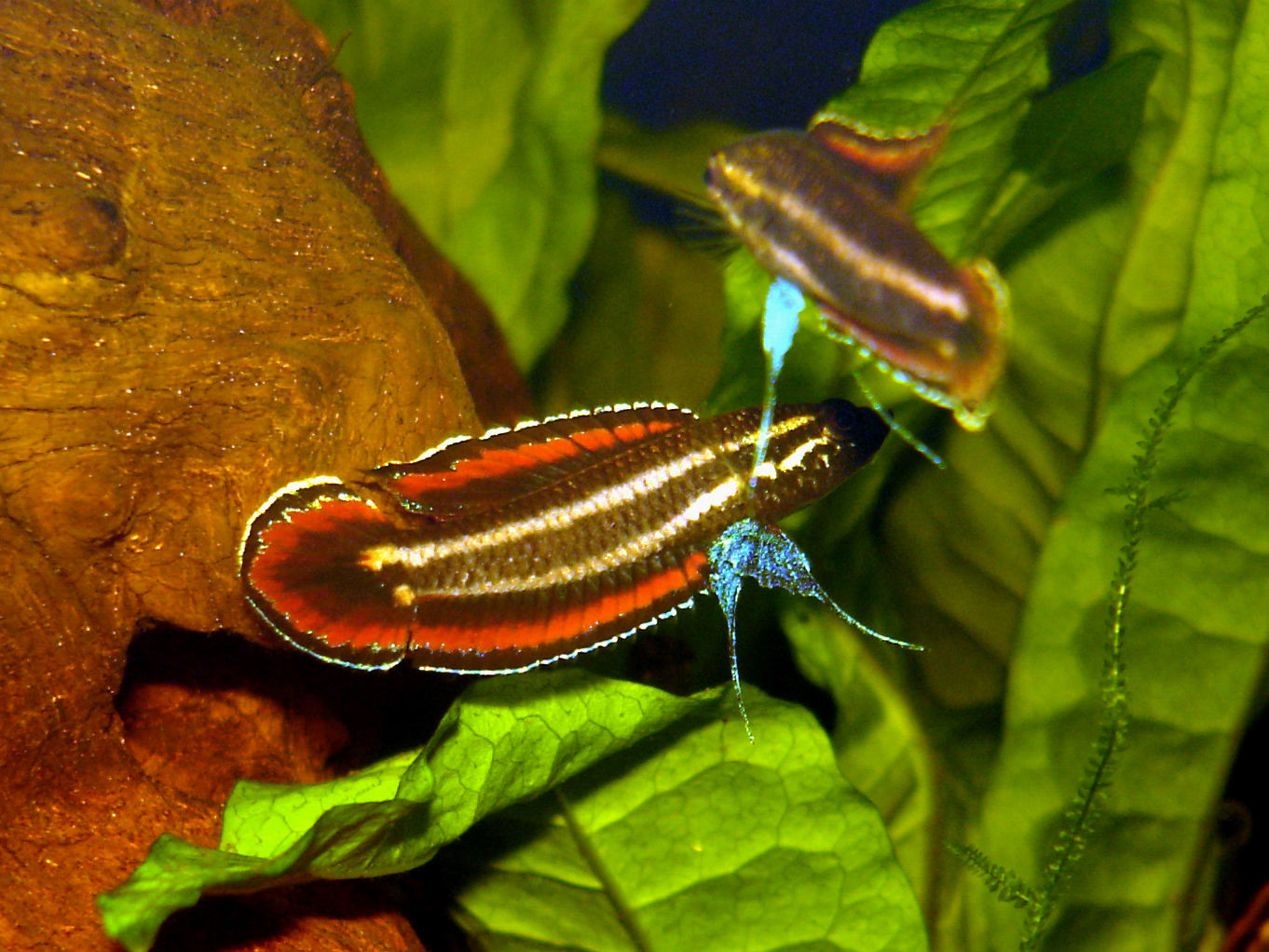

Scientific classification
- Kingdom: Animalia
- Phylum: Chordata
- Class: Actinopterygii
- Order: Anabantiformes
- Family: Osphronemidae
- Genus: Parosphromenus
- Species: P. kishii

Binomial name
- Parosphromenus kishii Shi et al., 2021

= Parosphromenus kishii =

Species of ray-finned fish

Parosphromenus kishii is a species of fish in the Osphronemidae family that was recorded as early as 1999, and formally described in 2021.

== Habitat ==
Parosphromenus kishii can be found in a single river system and swampy forest in the Central Kalimantan province of Indonesia.

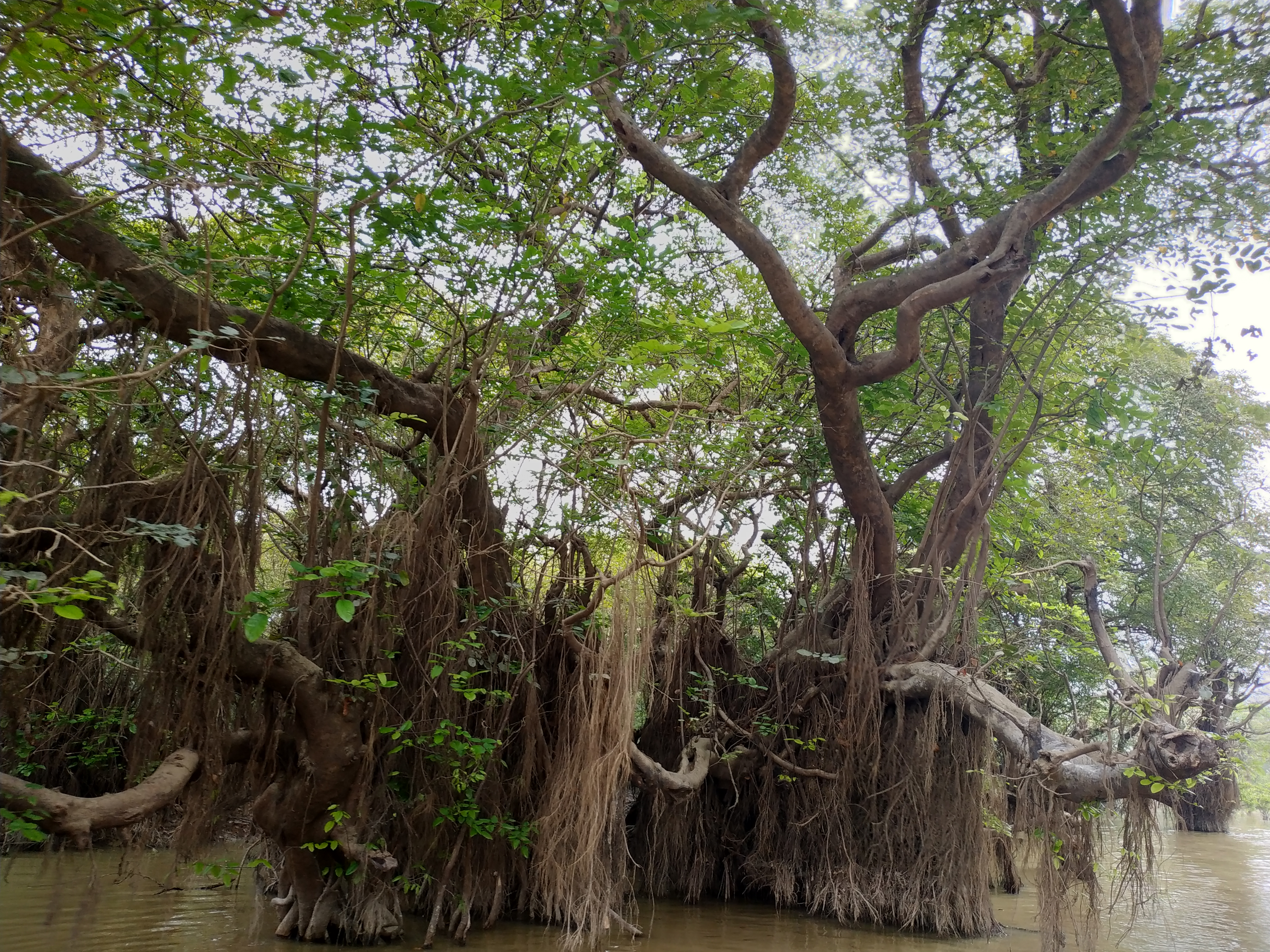
Swamp forest, habitat of Parosphromenus kishii

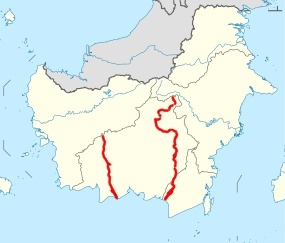
Parosphromenus kishii map
