= Breitensteinia =

Scientific classification
- Kingdom: Animalia
- Phylum: Chordata
- Class: Actinopterygii
- Order: Siluriformes
- Family: Akysidae
- Subfamily: Parakysinae
- Genus: Breitensteinia; Steindachner, 1881

Type species
- Breitensteinia insignis Steindachner, 1881

Genus of fishes

Breitensteinia is a genus of catfishes (order Siluriformes) of the family Akysidae. It includes three species.

== Taxonomy ==
B. insignis was first described for an unusual akysid by Franz Steindachner in 1881. The genus had been monotypic since its description until a revision in 1998, along with the description of the two species B. cessator and B. hypselurus.

This genus stands out as derived among the akysids due to the large increase in vertebrae count. B. insignis and B. cessator are more closely related to one another than to B. hypselurus, the sister group to the clade formed by the former two species.

== Species ==
- Breitensteinia cessator Ng & Siebert, 1998
- Breitensteinia hypselurus Ng & Siebert, 1998
- Breitensteinia insignis Steindachner, 1881

== Distribution and habitat ==
Breitensteinia species inhabit the middle and upper reaches of rivers in Borneo and Sumatra. B. cessator is known from the Batang Hari and Tulangbawan drainages in Sumatra and the Kapuas River drainage in western Borneo. B. hypselurus is known only from the Kapuas River basin in western Borneo. B. insignis comes from the Barito River drainage of southern Borneo.

== Description ==
Breitensteinia is a genus of akysid catfish lacking an adipose fin but having a long low adipose ridge, with a very long and slender caudal peduncle, with the gill openings not extending above the base of the pectoral spine, with 11–12 principal caudal-fin rays, and with 42–45 vertebrae. Like other akysids and unusually among catfish, they have a low principal caudal fin ray count and more rays in the upper caudal fin lobe than the lower. They have an elongate body, reflected by their high number of vertebrae which is eight to twelve more than in other akysid species, a clear sign of monophyly.

Breitensteinia species have a head that is depressed, broad, and covered with small tubercles, a tubular anterior nostril, a narrow occipital process with its tip tapering and reaching predorsal plate, a body with tubercles arranged in five to six longitudinal rows on each side, a dorsal profile rising evenly but not steeply from the tip of snout to the origin of dorsal fin and then sloping gently ventrally from there to the caudal peduncle, a horizontal ventral profile to the origin of the anal fin and then rising to the caudal peduncle, a dorsal fin origin nearer to the tip of the snout than caudal flexure, and a truncate caudal fin.

B. hypselurus has a smooth posterior edge to its dorsal fin spine, relatively tall neural spines on the caudal vertebrae, a shorter caudal peduncle, a longer snout, greater distance between the eyes, and fewer vertebrae than the other two species. Between B. insignis and B. cessator, B. cessator has larger eyes, greater distance between the eyes, and evenly scattered brown spots on the dorsal and pectoral fins, while B. insignis has smaller eyes, less distance between the eyes, and the brown spots on dorsal and pectoral fins concentrated in a dark band near the edges. B. cessator grows to about 7.5 centimetres (3.0 in) SL. B. hypselurus grows to about 12.2 cm (4.8 in) SL. B. insignis grows to about 22.0 cm (8.7 in) SL.

The dorsal surface of the head is brown, with dark-brown spots scattered randomly throughout. The dorsolateral and lateral surfaces of the body are dark brown with spots on the dorsolateral surface extending from the predorsal area to the base of the caudal fin. The adipose ridge is light brown. In B. cessator and B. insignis, a small patch of light brown is occasionally present on the predorsal area. The belly, chest, and ventral surface of the head is cream or light brown, with a few scattered brown spots in B. insignis. In B. cessator, the dorsal and pectoral fins are cream with numerous brown spots scattered throughout and the pelvic and anal fins are cream with one or two dark-brown bands, one present occasionally at the base of the fins and another in the distal half of the fins; in B. hypselurus and B. insignis, the dorsal, pectoral, pelvic, and anal fins are cream with a dark-brown band in the distal half of the fins. The caudal fin is cream with a dark brown band in the distal half and with a narrow midlateral prolongation. The barbels and pectoral spines are cream or light brown, with dark-brown spots, only present sometimes on the dorsal surfaces in B. cessator and B. insignis.

Sexual dimorphism is exhibited by B. insignis. Males have the anus situated immediately in front of a genital papilla, which is located immediately posterior to the pelvic-fin base. The genital opening is situated at the tip of the papilla, covered by a fleshy flap. In females, the anus is situated more posteriorly and the genital opening is located at the tip of a short genital appendage. The pelvic fins of females are also more closely set.

== Ecology ==
Prawns are included in the diet of these fish.

Breitensteinia species may moult their skin. This is accompanied by a temporary loss of pigmentation.
