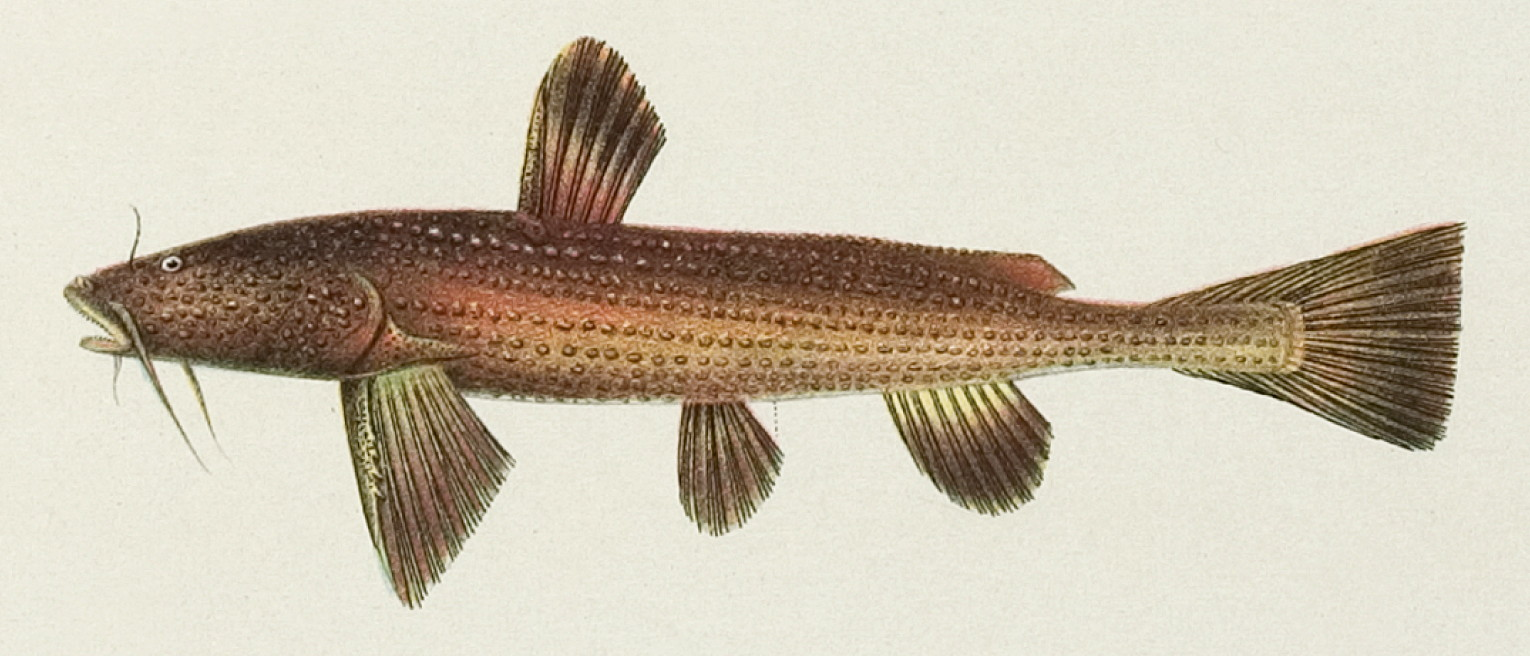

Scientific classification
- Kingdom: Animalia
- Phylum: Chordata
- Class: Actinopterygii
- Order: Siluriformes
- Family: Akysidae
- Genus: Acrochordonichthys
- Species: A. rugosus

Binomial name
- Acrochordonichthys rugosus (Bleeker, 1846)

Synonyms
- Pimelodus rugosus Bleeker, 1846; Acrochordonichthys melanogaster (Bleeker, 1854); Pimelodus pleurostigma Bleeker, 1855; Acrochordonichthys pleurostigma (Bleeker, 1855); Pimelodus zonatus Bleeker, 1855; Acrochordonichthys zonatus (Bleeker, 1855); Acrochordonichthys platycephalus Bleeker, 1858; Sosia chamaeleon pallida Vaillant, 1902; Acrochordonichthys obscurus Popta, 1904; Acrochordonichthys buettikoferi Popta, 1904; Acrochordonichthys varius Popta, 1904

= Acrochordonichthys rugosus =

Species of catfish

Acrochordonichthys rugosus is a species of catfish of the family Akysidae. It inhabits clear, swiftly flowing forested streams of Thailand, Malaysia and Indonesia. A detailed discussion of this species's relationship with the other members of its genus can be found on Acrochordonichthys.
