= Genital papilla =

Anatomical feature

The genital papilla is an anatomical feature of the external genitalia of some animals.

== In mammals ==
In mammals, the genital papilla is a part of the vulva not present in humans, which appears as a small, fleshy flab of tissue. The papilla covers the opening of the vagina.

== In fish ==
The genital papilla (urogenital/genital pore) is a small, fleshy tube behind the anus present in most teleost fish, from which the sperm or eggs are released; the sex of a fish often can be determined by the shape of its papilla.
