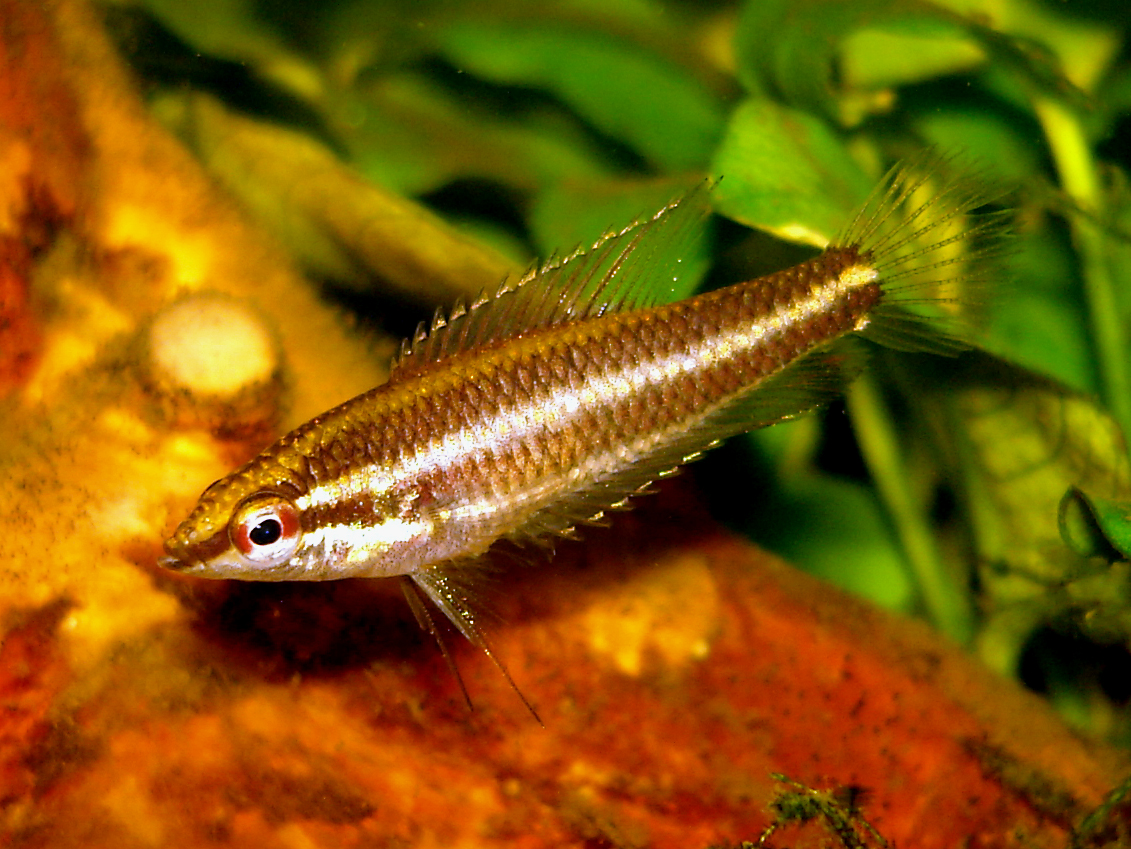

Conservation status
- Endangered (IUCN 3.1)

Scientific classification
- Kingdom: Animalia
- Phylum: Chordata
- Class: Actinopterygii
- Order: Anabantiformes
- Family: Osphronemidae
- Genus: Parosphromenus
- Species: P. deissneri

Binomial name
- Parosphromenus deissneri (Bleeker, 1859)
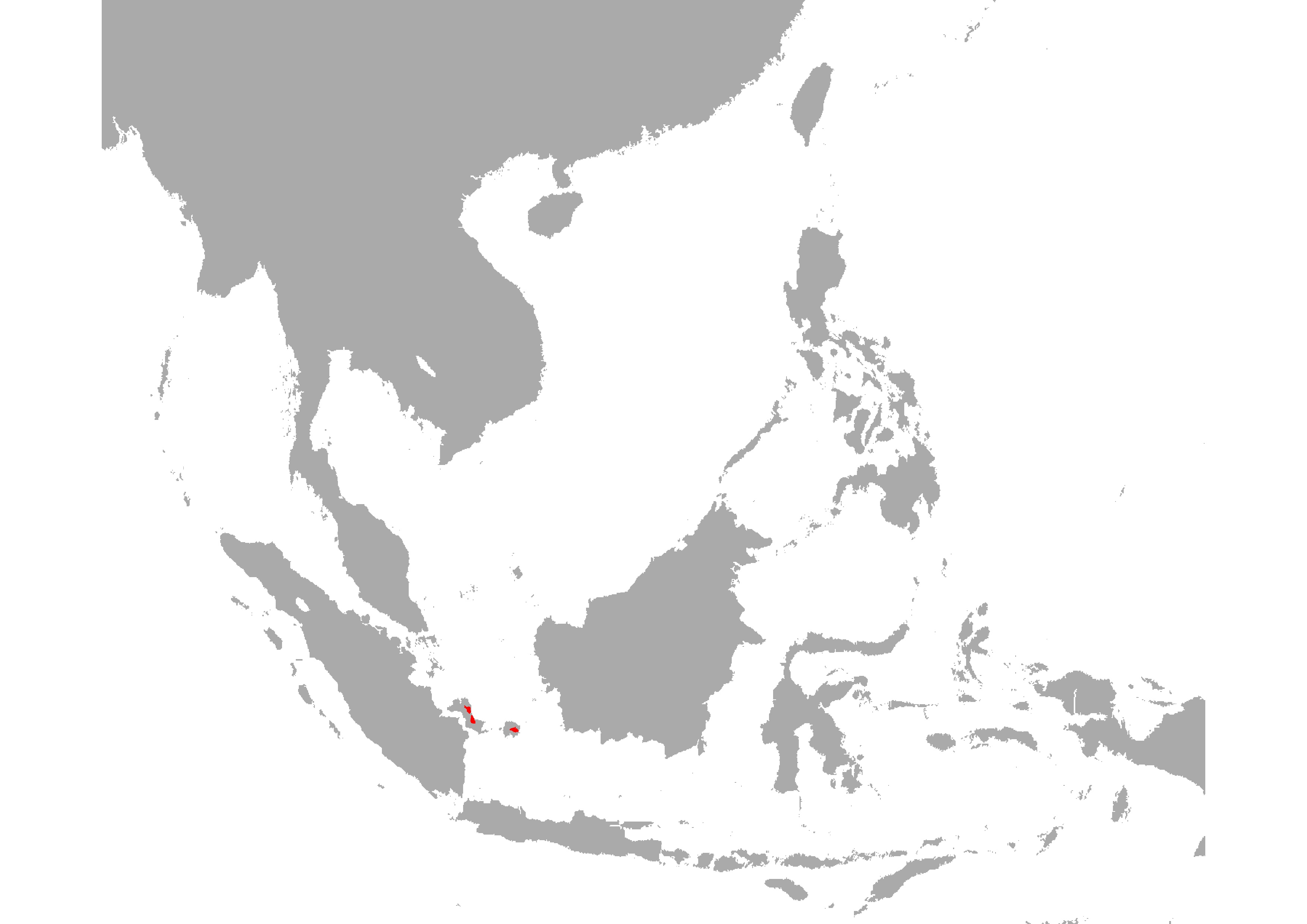

Synonyms
- Osphromenus deissneri Bleeker, 1859

= Licorice gourami =

Species of fish

The licorice gourami (Parosphromenus deissneri) is a species of freshwater ray-finned fish from the subfamily Macropodusinae, part of the family Osphronemidae, the gouramis. It is endemic to Bangka in Indonesia where it is found in the slow, flowing streams with black waters associated with peat swamp forests. This species was formally described by the Dutch ichthyologist Pieter Bleeker as Osphromenus deissneri in 1859 with the type locality given as Sungai Baturussa basin at 8 kilometres from Pudingbesar on the road to Kampong Simpan, Bangka. It is the type species of the genus Parosphromenus. The specific name honours F. H. Deissner, a military health officer, who sent a collection of specimens of fishes from Bangka to Bleeker which included the type of this species.
