= Peter Kee Lin Ng =

Singaporean carcinologist and ichthyologist

- Born: 1960 (age 65–66)
- Education: National University of Singapore; Nanyang Technological University
- Scientific career
- Fields: carcinology; ichthyology
- Workplaces: National University of Singapore
- Website: http://www.dbs.nus.edu.sg/staff/peterng.html

Peter Kee Lin Ng (born 1960) is a Singaporean carcinologist and ichthyologist at the National University of Singapore, concurrently working as Director of both the Lee Kong Chian Natural History Museum and the Tropical Marine Science Institute. He has written extensively with over 510 technical papers, mostly in international journals - his research is primarily on the diversity and biology of marine and freshwater crabs in the Indo-West Pacific. He has many awards, the Singapore National Youth Award (Excellence in Science and Technology), National Youth Movement, People's Association (1993); the National Science Award 1995, National Science & Technology Board, Ministry of Trade and Development; and the ASEAN Young Science and Technologist Award, ASEAN Science and Technology Ministers, 4th ASEAN Science Ministers Meeting, Bangkok (1995).

== Taxa described by him ==
- See Category:Taxa named by Peter Kee Lin Ng
