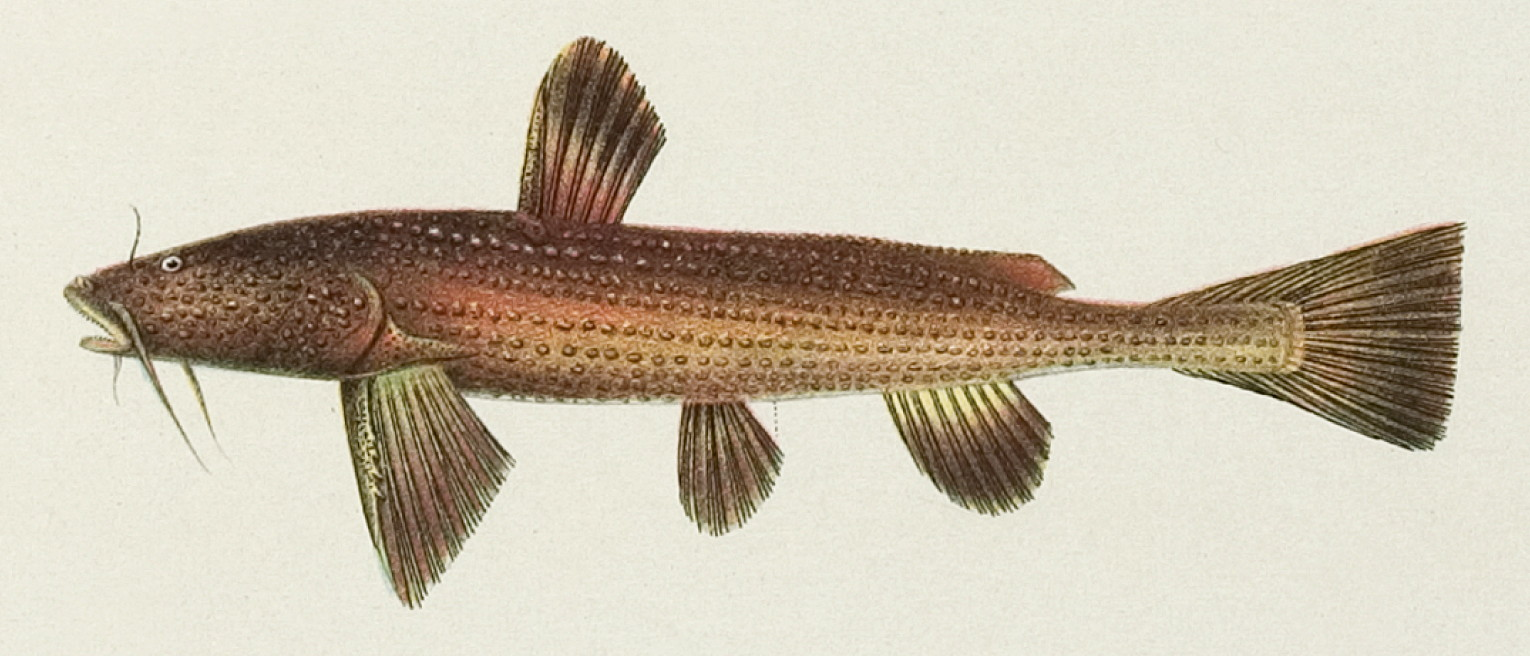
- Acrochordonichthys rugosus

Scientific classification
- Kingdom: Animalia
- Phylum: Chordata
- Class: Actinopterygii
- Order: Siluriformes
- Superfamily: Sisoroidea
- Family: Akysidae; Gill, 1861

Genera
- Subfamily Akysinae; Akysis; Pseudobagarius; Subfamily Parakysinae; Acrochordonichthys; Breitensteinia; Parakysis

= Stream catfish =

Stream catfishes

Family of fishes

The stream catfishes make up the family Akysidae of catfishes.

== Distribution and habitat ==
Akysids are known from across a large area in Southeast Asia. They are found in fresh water. Fish of the subfamily Parakysinae are primarily found in the Malay Peninsula, Sumatra, Sarawak, and western and southern Borneo. Most species are generally found in deeper parts of relatively swift rivers and forest streams.

== Taxonomy ==
It includes at least 57 species in five genera; many species are only recently described. The family is divided into two subfamilies, Akysinae and Parakysinae. The Parakysinae had previously been listed as an independent family.

This family is sister to a clade formed by Sisoridae, Erethistidae, and Aspredinidae.

== Description ==
Akysids are small to minute fishes with cryptic colouration, tiny eyes, and completely covered with unculiferous plaques or tubercles. In some genera, some of the tubercles on the body are enlarged and arranged in distinctive longitudinal rows, the number of which may be diagnostic. The dorsal fin has a strong spine and a short base, and usually four or five soft rays and four pairs of barbels are found. Unusually among catfish, they have a low principal caudal fin ray count and more rays in the upper caudal fin lobe than the lower.

In the Akysinae, the body has small unculiferous tubercles arranged in longitudinal rows, a median mid-dorsal row, usually in four lateral rows. The dorsal fin usually has five soft rays. An adipose fin is present and moderate. The pectoral fin has a strong spine, and the anterior margin has a notch visible dorsally and usually serrated posteriorly. The gill openings are relatively narrow and the eyes are small.

In the Parakysinae, the dorsal fin has four soft rays. The pectoral fin spine is not serrated. The anal fin has eight to 13 soft rays. The mandibular barbels usually have short accessory barbels. Gill rakers and lateral line pores are absent. The head and body are covered with rounded tubercles arranged in longitudinal rows in Acrochordontichthys and Breitensteinia or evenly distributed in Parakysis. The adipose fin is absent in Breitensteinia and Parakysis and is present as an adipose ridge; the fin is present and long in Acrochordontichthys. The eyes are minute. They have 30–32 vertebrae.
