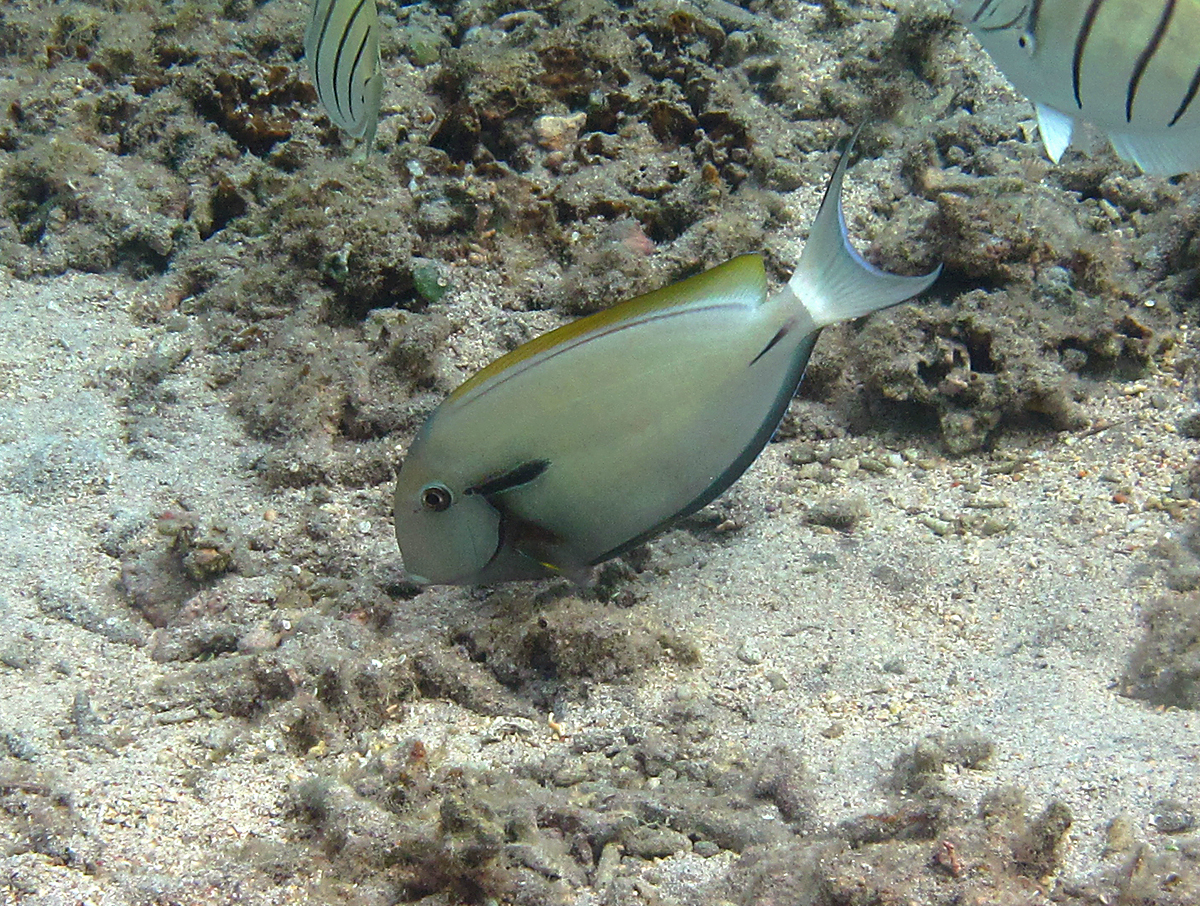

Conservation status
- Least Concern (IUCN 3.1)

Scientific classification
- Kingdom: Animalia
- Phylum: Chordata
- Class: Actinopterygii
- Order: Acanthuriformes
- Family: Acanthuridae
- Genus: Acanthurus
- Species: A. nigricauda

Binomial name
- Acanthurus nigricauda Duncker & Mohr, 1929

Synonyms
- Acanthurus gahhm nigricauda Duncker & Mohr, 1929

= Acanthurus nigricauda =

Species of fish

Acanthurus nigricauda, the epaulette surgeonfish, black-barred surgeonfish, eye-line surgeonfish, shoulderbar surgeonfish, white-tail surgeonfish or blackstreak surgeonfish, is a species of marine ray-finned fish belonging to the family Acanthuridae, the surgeonfishes, unicornfishes and tangs. It is native to the Indo-Pacific region.

== Taxonomy ==
Acanthurus nigricauda was first formally described as a subspecies of Acanthurus gahhm in 1929 by the German zoologists Georg Duncker and& Erna Mohr with its type locality given as Massau Island in the St Matthias Islands northeast of New Ireland in the Bismarck Archipelago in Papua New Guinea. It was confirmed as a separate valid species by John E. Randall in 1987. The genus Acanthurus is one of two genera in the tribe Acanthurini which is one of three tribes in the subfamily Acanthurinae which is one of two subfamilies in the family Acanthuridae.

== Etymology ==
Acanthuurus nigricauda was given the subspecific name, nigricauda meaning "black tail", because its dark brown caudal peduncle distinguished it from the nominate A. g. gahhm. Duncker and Mohr originally described this taxon as a subspecies of that species.

== Description ==
Acanthurus nigricauda is a laterally compressed, deep-bodied fish reaching a maximum length of 40 cm (16 in). The profile of the head is convex, the eyes are fairly prominent and there are two pairs of nostrils just in front of the eyes. The dorsal fin has 9 spines and 25 to 28 soft rays, and the anal fin has 3 spines and 23 to 26 soft rays. The caudal fin is crescent-shaped. The body is covered with tiny scales giving it a smooth appearance, and the lateral line is indistinct. The head is usually paler than the body, which is a uniform shade but varies in colour from pale grey to dark brown or nearly black, depending on the fish's mood. There is a bold black streak behind the eye, the "epaulette", which extends as far as the operculum, and a slender black line in front of the pair of sharp "scalpels" on the caudal peduncle. The dorsal fin is yellowish with a black line with blue edge at the margin, and the anal fin is grey with a blue margin. The pectoral fins have an orange base and are banded in grey, yellow and translucent, and the caudal fin has a white base and a dark outer portion bordered with blue. A. nigricauda can be distinguished from the similar doubleband surgeonfish (Acanthurus tennenti) by the single "epaulette" behind its head.

== Distribution and habitat ==
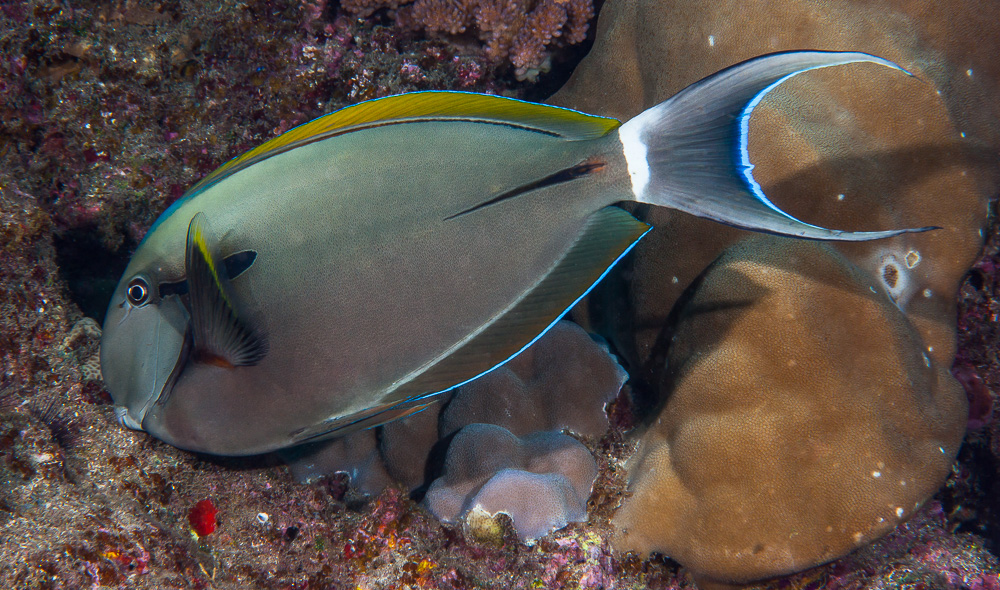
At Réunion

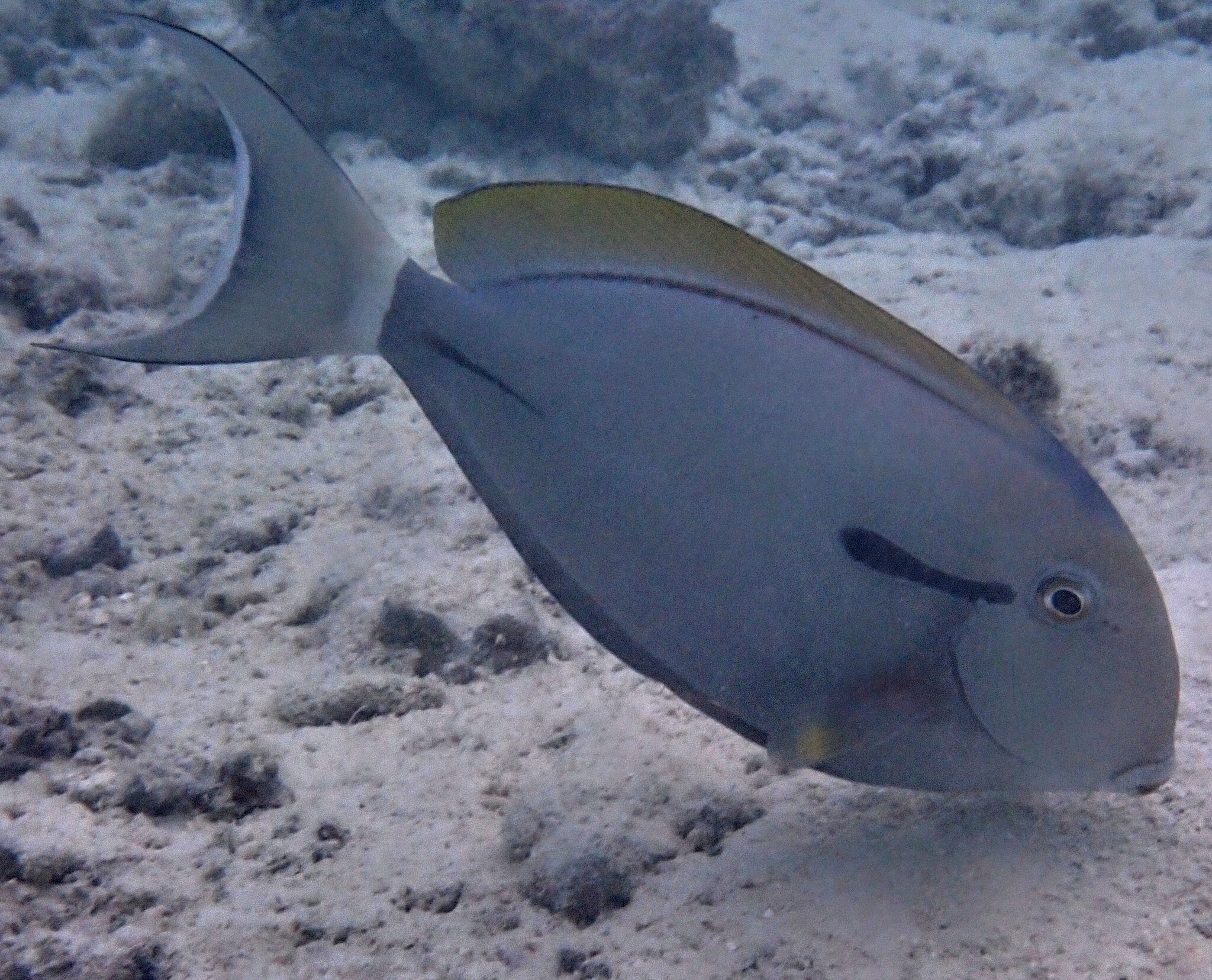
In the Maldives

Acanthurus nigricauda occurs in the tropical and subtropical Indian Ocean and the western and central Pacific Ocean. Its range extends from East Africa and Madagascar to the Tuamoto Islands, and from southern Japan to Northern and Eastern Australia and New Caledonia. It occurs over sandy and rocky bottoms, in bays, lagoons and on reef slopes, at depths down to about 30 m (100 ft). Unlike most other members of its genus, it is seldom found over coral.

== Ecology ==
Acanthurus nigricauda is a schooling fish and forms shoals, sometimes in association with the orange-band surgeonfish (Acanthurus olivaceus). It feeds by grazing on the algal film that grows over sandy areas in the vicinity of coral or rock substrates, but the proportion of algae in its stomach is low, and it mostly subsists on the organic detritus that gets trapped in the film.

The sexes are separate in this species, and both sexes become mature at a length of about 15 cm (6 in). Large aggregations of fish occur at breeding time, with both sexes liberating their gametes into the water column. The scalpels on the caudal peduncle are retractable and are very sharp; they are displayed when the tail is thrust to the side and are used to slash at rival fish and for protection against predators. Juvenile fish are shorter and more deep-bodied than adults. They are deep brown at first, with a yellowish, unnotched caudal fin, and gradually change colour as they reach a length of between 5 and 10 cm (2 and 4 in).
