= Hemirhamphodon kecil =

Conservation status
- Vulnerable (IUCN 3.1)

Scientific classification
- Kingdom: Animalia
- Phylum: Chordata
- Class: Actinopterygii
- Order: Beloniformes
- Family: Zenarchopteridae
- Genus: Hemirhamphodon
- Species: H. kecil

Binomial name
- Hemirhamphodon kecil H. H. Tan & K. K. P. Lim, 2013

Species of fish

Hemirhamphodon kecil is a species of fish belonging to the family Zenarchopteridae. The fish is found in the Mahakam Basin eastwards into the Makassar Strait in Indonesia.The fish grows up to 4.1 centimeters (SL).

== Etymology ==
The name kecil refers to the Malay word "kecil" which means "small" in Malay.

== Status ==
As of 2020, the IUCN has listed Hemirhamphodon kecil as Vulnerable.
