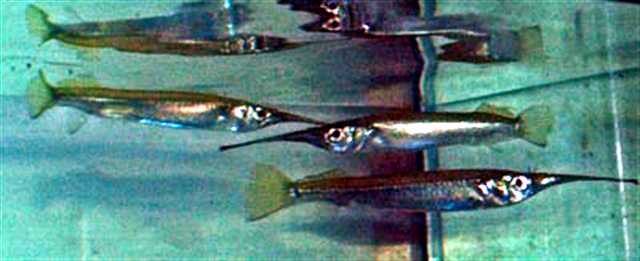
- Zenarchopterus dunckeri

Scientific classification
- Kingdom: Animalia
- Phylum: Chordata
- Class: Actinopterygii
- Order: Beloniformes
- Family: Zenarchopteridae
- Genus: Zenarchopterus; T. N. Gill, 1864

Type species
- Hemiramphus dispar Valenciennes, 1847

= Zenarchopterus =

Genus of fishes

Zenarchopterus is a genus of viviparous halfbeaks. These fish are found in marine, brackish and fresh water of the Indo-Pacific region. Despite being in the viviparous halfbeak family, Zenarchopterus species are oviparous.

They are commonly known as river garfish.

== Species ==
There are currently 19 recognized species in this genus:

- Zenarchopterus alleni (Collette, 1982) (Allen's river garfish)
- Zenarchopterus buffonis (Valenciennes, 1847) (Buffon's river garfish)
- Zenarchopterus caudovittatus (M. C. W. Weber, 1907) (Long-jawed river garfish)
- Zenarchopterus clarus (Mohr, 1926)
- Zenarchopterus dispar (Valenciennes, 1847) (Feathered river garfish)
- Zenarchopterus dunckeri (Mohr, 1926) (Duncker's river garfish)
- Zenarchopterus dux (Seale, 1910)
- Zenarchopterus ectuntio (F. Hamilton, 1822)
- Zenarchopterus gilli (H. M. Smith, 1945)
- Zenarchopterus kampeni (M. C. W. Weber, 1913) (Sepik River halfbeak)
- Zenarchopterus novaeguineae (M. C. W. Weber, 1913) (Fly River garfish)
- Zenarchopterus ornithocephala (Collette, 1985) (Vogelkop river garfish)
- Zenarchopterus pappenheimi (Mohr, 1926) (Bangkok halfbeak)
- Zenarchopterus philippinus (W. K. H. Peters, 1868)
- Zenarchopterus quadrimaculatus (Mohr, 1926)
- Zenarchopterus rasori (Popta, 1912) (Short river garfish)
- Zenarchopterus robertsi (Collette, 1982) (Robert's river garfish)
- Zenarchopterus striga (Blyth, 1858) (Hooghly halfbeak)
- Zenarchopterus takaoensis (Liao, Thiel, Chang, 2024) (Takao's garfish)
- Zenarchopterus xiphophorus (Mohr, 1934)
