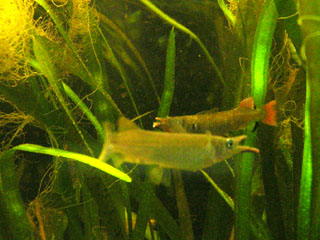

Conservation status
- Data Deficient (IUCN 3.1)

Scientific classification
- Kingdom: Animalia
- Phylum: Chordata
- Class: Actinopterygii
- Order: Beloniformes
- Family: Zenarchopteridae
- Genus: Nomorhamphus
- Species: N. ebrardtii

Binomial name
- Nomorhamphus ebrardtii (Popta, 1912)

Synonyms
- Dermogenys ebrardtii (Popta, 1912); Hemiramphus ebrardtii Popta, 1912

= Nomorhamphus ebrardtii =

Species of fish

Nomorhamphus ebrardtii is a species of viviparous halfbeak, a ray-finned fish in the family Zenarchopteridae, endemic to brackish and freshwater locations in Sulawesi and the neighbouring island of Kabaena in Indonesia. This species can reach a length of 9 cm (3.5 in) SL.

== Description ==
Nomorhamphus ebrardtii grows to a standard length of about 9 cm (3.5 in). It is an elongate, somewhat compressed fish with the lower mandible considerably longer than the upper mandible. Alongside this there is a fold of skin which projects sideways. The beak contains no teeth but there are small pointed teeth in both jaws. The dorsal fin has ten to twelve soft rays, the anal fin fifteen and the pectoral fins twelve. The dorsal fin is shorter than the anal fin, and its origin is posterior to the origin of the anal fin. The fifth ray of the dorsal fin is the longest but is not as long as the second ray of the anal fin. This is modified in males into an "andropodium", a movable intromittent organ used to deliver milt into the female's genital opening. The ventral fins are small and are slightly closer to the head than to the caudal fin (a diagnostic feature) and the caudal fin is rounded. The colour of preserved specimens is yellowish and there is a dark blotch at the base of the pectoral fins.

== Ecology ==
Members of the family Zenarchopteridae show a number of different viviparous breeding strategies. Nomorhamphus ebrardtii is unusual in that the developing embryos are retained in the oviduct where they receive their nourishment from oophagy and adelphophagy, oophagy being the feeding on unfertilised eggs, while adelphophagy is the feeding on fertilised eggs, developing embryos, and smaller siblings.
