= Nomorhamphus megarrhamphus =

Conservation status
- Near Threatened (IUCN 3.1)

Scientific classification
- Kingdom: Animalia
- Phylum: Chordata
- Class: Actinopterygii
- Order: Beloniformes
- Family: Zenarchopteridae
- Genus: Nomorhamphus
- Species: N. megarrhamphus

Binomial name
- Nomorhamphus megarrhamphus (Brembach, 1982)

Synonyms
- Dermogenys megarrhamphus Brembach, 1982

Species of fish

Nomorhamphus megarrhamphus is a species of viviparous halfbeak, a freshwater fish endemic to Lake Towuti in Sulawesi, Indonesia.

Nomorhamphus megarrhamphus has a pelagic life style. It grows up to 12 cm length. It has been called the Indonesian halfbeak.
