= Zenarchopterus takaoensis =

Scientific classification
- Domain: Eukaryota
- Kingdom: Animalia
- Phylum: Chordata
- Class: Actinopterygii
- Order: Beloniformes
- Family: Zenarchopteridae
- Genus: Zenarchopterus
- Species: Z. takaoensis

Binomial name
- Zenarchopterus takaoensis Liao, Thiel, Chang, 2024

Species of fish

Zenarchopterus takaoensis (Takao's garfish) is a species of fish in the family Hemiramphidae.

A specimen of Zenarchopterus takaoensis had been displayed at Museum der Natur Hamburg since 1907, with its origin labeled as "Takao, Formosa," referring to place names in use during the period of Japanese rule in Taiwan. Bruce Baden Collette and Jinxiang Su wrote about this specimen in 1986, but did not identify it as a new species at the time. Two Taiwanese researchers, Chang Chih-wei from the National Academy of Marine Research and Liao Yun-chih of the University of Taipei's Department of Earth and Life Science, captured seven live specimens at Dongshi Fishing Harbor in Chiayi County in 2023, and with Museum der Natur Hamburg curator Ralf Thiel, formally named the species in 2024.
