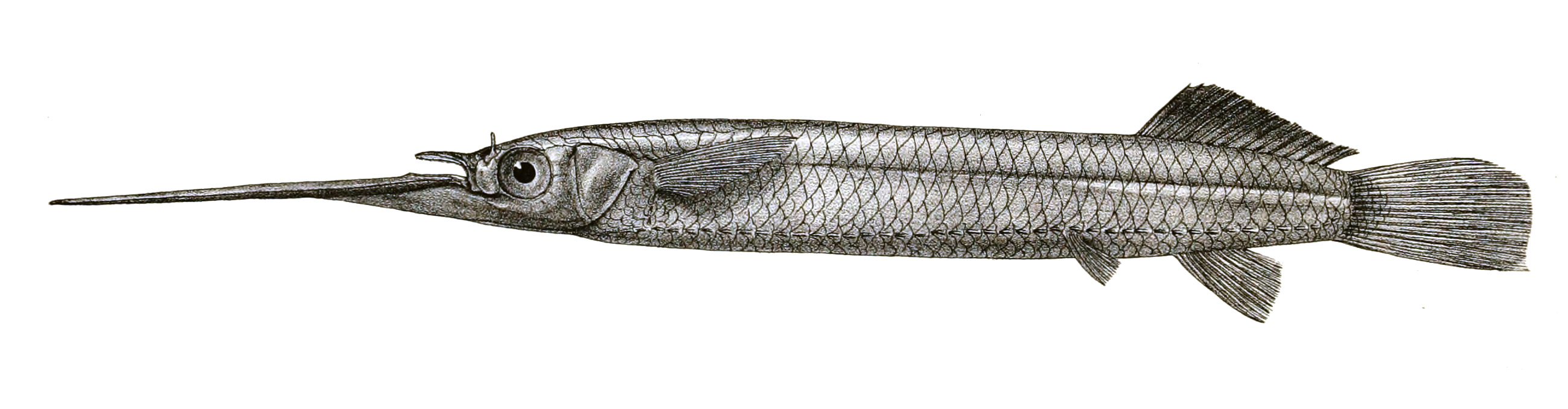
- Hemiramphus_buffonis_Mintern_119

Scientific classification
- Kingdom: Animalia
- Phylum: Chordata
- Class: Actinopterygii
- Order: Beloniformes
- Family: Zenarchopteridae
- Genus: Zenarchopterus
- Species: Z. buffonis

Binomial name
- Zenarchopterus buffonis (Valenciennes, 1847)

= Buffon's river garfish =

Species of fish

Buffon's river garfish (Zenarchopterus buffonis) is a species of fish in the family Hemiramphidae.

== Distribution and habitat ==
Buffon's river garfish is found at the surface levels of rivers, estuaries and coastal waters throughout the Indo-West Pacific region, extending from southern China to northern Australia. It feeds on terrestrial insects. It grows up to 23 cm in length and is not a commercially fished species.
