= Allen's river garfish =

Conservation status
- Data Deficient (IUCN 3.1)

Scientific classification
- Kingdom: Animalia
- Phylum: Chordata
- Class: Actinopterygii
- Order: Beloniformes
- Family: Zenarchopteridae
- Genus: Zenarchopterus
- Species: Z. alleni

Binomial name
- Zenarchopterus alleni Collette, 1982

Species of fish

Allen's river garfish (Zenarchopterus alleni) is a species of viviparous halfbeak endemic to West Papua in Indonesia.

The Allen's river garfish was first discovered in the Mamberamo River in Papua, Indonesia. It is known from only one specimen. The specimen recovered measured 13 centimetres (5.1 in) SL in length and had 14 dorsal soft rays and 13 anal soft rays. The specific name honours the American ichthyologist Gerald R. Allen.
