= Black surgeonfish =

Black surgeonfish is a common name for several fishes and may refer to:

- Acanthurus gahhm
- Ctenochaetus hawaiiensis
