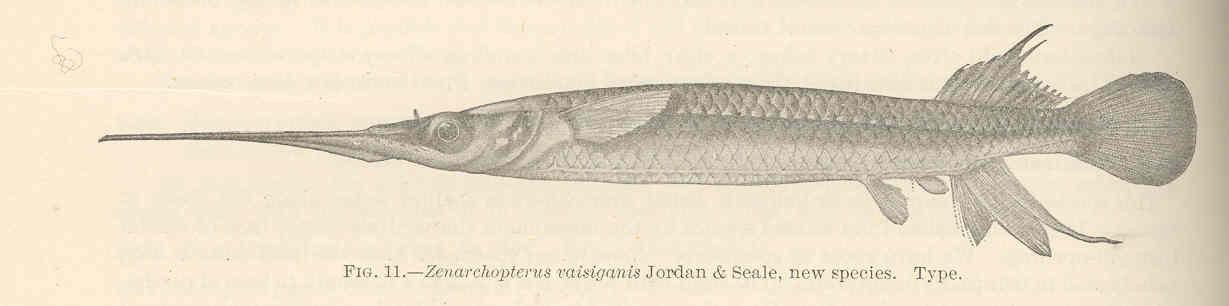

Conservation status
- Least Concern (IUCN 3.1)

Scientific classification
- Kingdom: Animalia
- Phylum: Chordata
- Class: Actinopterygii
- Order: Beloniformes
- Family: Zenarchopteridae
- Genus: Zenarchopterus
- Species: Z. dispar

Binomial name
- Zenarchopterus dispar (Valenciennes, 1847)

Synonyms
- Hemiramphus dispar Valenciennes, 1847; Zenarchopterus maculosus Garman, 1903; Zenarchopterus vaisiganus Jordan & Seale, 1906

= Zenarchopterus dispar =

Species of fish

The feathered river garfish (Zenarchopterus dispar), also known as the estuarine halfbeak, spoon-fin garfish, spoon-fin river garfish and viviparous half beak, is a species of marine, freshwater, brackish and reef-associated oceanodromous viviparous halfbeak found in Indo-Pacific regional countries, such as Kenya, Mozambique, Seychelles, Madagascar, New Guinea, Solomon Islands, Australia, New Caledonia, Fiji, Sri Lanka, India, Vanuatu, Malaysia, Thailand, Singapore and Samoa.

== Description ==
The species measured 19.0 centimetres (7.5 in) SL in length. The body shows a typical halfbeak shape with an elongated lower jaw and cylindrical elongated body. They have no spines on fins, but do have 11-12 rays of their dorsal fins and 12-13 rays on their anal fins. Pectoral fin is much shorter than head length. Snout is uniform and brown in color. The fish can be found in found around mangroves and sheltered shallow areas, where juveniles are neustonic and can be seen floating on the surface of the water.

== See also ==
- List of common commercial fish of Sri Lanka
