= Dermogenys bruneiensis =

Conservation status
- Near Threatened (IUCN 3.1)

Scientific classification
- Kingdom: Animalia
- Phylum: Chordata
- Class: Actinopterygii
- Order: Beloniformes
- Family: Zenarchopteridae
- Genus: Dermogenys
- Species: D. bruneiensis

Binomial name
- Dermogenys bruneiensis A. D. Meisner, 2001

Species of fish

Dermogenys bruneiensis is a species of fish belonging to the family Zenarchopteridae. The fish is endemic to Brunei. Males can reach up to 3.4 cm (1.3 in) SL long while females reach up to 5.5 cm (2.2 in) SL long.

== Etymology ==
The name bruneiensis is named after the country of Brunei in which the fish is endemic to.

== Status ==
As of 2020, IUCN has listed Dermogenys bruneiensis as Near Threatened.
