= Dermogenys collettei =

Scientific classification
- Kingdom: Animalia
- Phylum: Chordata
- Class: Actinopterygii
- Order: Beloniformes
- Family: Zenarchopteridae
- Genus: Dermogenys
- Species: D. collettei

Binomial name
- Dermogenys collettei A. D. Meisner, 2001

Species of fish

Dermogenys collettei is a species of viviparous halfbeak found in freshwater areas in Thailand, Malaysia, Singapore, and Indonesia. This species was described in 2001 by Amy Downing Meisner with the type locality given as Kuching in Sarawak. The specific name honours the American ichthyologist Bruce Baden Collette.

Dermogenys collettei have been shown to exhibit shoaling behavior. However, contrary to predictions, they exhibited this behavior in low predation scenarios, forest stream habitats in low predation, and more open stream habitats. They did not exhibit shoaling when faced with immediate predation risk. Their behavior suggests that adaptive responses to immediate predation risk are absent.
