= Dermogenys brachynotopterus =

Gangetic halfbeak

Conservation status
- Data Deficient (IUCN 3.1)

Scientific classification
- Kingdom: Animalia
- Phylum: Chordata
- Class: Actinopterygii
- Order: Beloniformes
- Family: Zenarchopteridae
- Genus: Dermogenys
- Species: D. brachynotopterus

Binomial name
- Dermogenys brachynotopterus (Bleeker, 1853)

Synonyms
- Hemirhamphus brachynotopterus Bleeker, 1853

Species of fish

Dermogenys brachynotopterus, the Gangetic halfbeak, is a species of viviparous halfbeak.

== Distribution ==
The Gangetic halfbeak is native to India and Bangladesh. Although IUCN] and FishBase state that it is only known from the holotype discovered in the Hooghly estuary in West Bengal, India,

IUCN postulates that Dermogenys brachynotopterus and Dermogenys burmanica could be the same species, with D. brachynotopterus having the taxonomic seniority.

== Habitat and biology ==
It is a pelagic species of fish, and inhabits the brackish waters of estuaries.
