= Nomorhamphus philippinus =

Conservation status
- Data Deficient (IUCN 3.1)

Scientific classification
- Kingdom: Animalia
- Phylum: Chordata
- Class: Actinopterygii
- Order: Beloniformes
- Family: Zenarchopteridae
- Genus: Nomorhamphus
- Species: N. philippinus

Binomial name
- Nomorhamphus philippinus (Ladiges, 1972)

Synonyms
- Dermogenys philippinius Ladiges, 1972; Dermogenys philippinus Ladiges, 1972; Nomorhamphus philippina (Ladiges, 1972)

Species of ray-finned fish

Nomorhamphus philippinus is a species of viviparous halfbeak endemic to the Philippines. It belongs to the family Zenarchopteridae, a group of freshwater and brackish water fishes known for their elongated jaws and live-bearing reproductive strategy.

== Description ==
N. philippinus is a deep-bodied viviparous halfbeak distinguished by several morphological features, particularly in the structure of the anal fin and jaw proportions. The species has 36–37 vertebrae, including 21 precaudal vertebrae and 16 caudal vertebrae. It possesses 33–39 predorsal scales and a relatively short lower jaw measuring approximately 10.4–18.8 times in standard length (SL). The upper jaw is longer than it is wide, with a ratio of approximately 1.3–1.8. Both upper and lower jaws contain biserial rows of conical teeth.

The pectoral fins are pointed and, in males, do not reach the pelvic fins. The caudal fin is truncate. The dorsal fin originates above the sixth or seventh anal-fin ray and typically contains 12 rays, while the anal fin contains 14–15 rays. The fifth hypural bone is separated from the dorsal hypural plate along most of its length.

This species is most similar to other Philippine members of its genus, including N. pectoralis, N. vivipara, N. pinnimaculata, and N. manifesta, due to the elongate structure of the spiculus in males. However, N. philippinus can be distinguished by the segmentation pattern of the second anal-fin ray, in which the segments are approximately equal in length. The spiculus contains 9–10 segments, with a terminal segment that curves ventrally and is shorter than the segmented region. The terminal segment is also shorter than that observed in N. vivipara. Additionally, the species exhibits distinctive black pigmentation at the distal tips of the dorsal and anal-fin rays.

== Habitat ==
This species is endemic to the Philippines. It is known from river basins in Cebu Island and in the provinces of Sultan Kudarat and Maguindanao on Mindanao Island.
