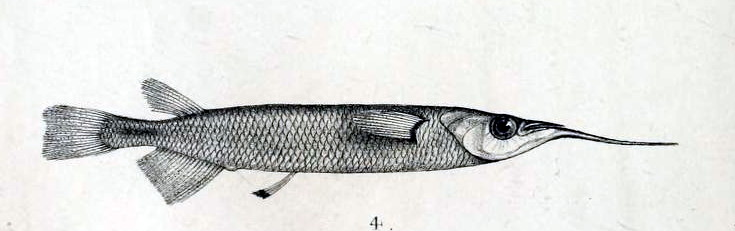

Conservation status
- Near Threatened (IUCN 3.1)

Scientific classification
- Kingdom: Animalia
- Phylum: Chordata
- Class: Actinopterygii
- Order: Beloniformes
- Family: Zenarchopteridae
- Genus: Nomorhamphus
- Species: N. weberi

Binomial name
- Nomorhamphus weberi (Boulenger, 1897)

Synonyms
- Hemirhamphus weberi Boulenger, 1897; Dermogenys weberi (Boulenger, 1897)

= Nomorhamphus weberi =

Species of fish

Nomorhamphus weberi is a species of viviparous halfbeak endemic to Lake Matano in Sulawesi, Indonesia. This species can reach a length of 7.5 centimetres (3.0 in) SL. The specific name honours the Dutch ichthyologist Max Carl Wilhelm Weber (1852-1937).
