= Dermogenys bispina =

Conservation status
- Least Concern (IUCN 3.1)

Scientific classification
- Kingdom: Animalia
- Phylum: Chordata
- Class: Actinopterygii
- Order: Beloniformes
- Family: Zenarchopteridae
- Genus: Dermogenys
- Species: D. bispina

Binomial name
- Dermogenys bispina A. D. Meisner & Collette, 1998

Species of fish

Dermogenys bispina is a species of fish belonging to the family Zenarchopteridae. The fish is found in Malaysia and the Philippines.
