= Poso halfbeak =

Conservation status
- Endangered (IUCN 3.1)

Scientific classification
- Kingdom: Animalia
- Phylum: Chordata
- Class: Actinopterygii
- Order: Beloniformes
- Family: Zenarchopteridae
- Genus: Nomorhamphus
- Species: N. celebensis

Binomial name
- Nomorhamphus celebensis M. C. W. Weber & de Beaufort, 1922

Species of fish

The Poso halfbeak (Nomorhamphus celebensis) is a species of viviparous halfbeak endemic to Lake Poso and its tributaries in Sulawesi, Indonesia.
