= Nomorhamphus aenigma =

Scientific classification
- Kingdom: Animalia
- Phylum: Chordata
- Class: Actinopterygii
- Order: Beloniformes
- Family: Zenarchopteridae
- Genus: Nomorhamphus
- Species: N. aenigma

Binomial name
- Nomorhamphus aenigma Kobayashi, Masengi & Yamahira, 2020

Species of fish

Nomorhamphus aenigma is a species of fish belonging to the family Zenarchopteridae. The species is found in Sulawesi, Indonesia. The fish grows up to 6.1 centimetres (2.4 in) long (SL).

== Etymology ==
The name aenigma comes from ancient Greek noun for "riddle".

== Status ==
As of 2024, the IUCN has not evaluated Nomorhamphus aenigma.
