= Hemirhamphodon tengah =

Conservation status
- Least Concern (IUCN 3.1)

Scientific classification
- Kingdom: Animalia
- Phylum: Chordata
- Class: Actinopterygii
- Order: Beloniformes
- Family: Zenarchopteridae
- Genus: Hemirhamphodon
- Species: H. tengah

Binomial name
- Hemirhamphodon tengah Collette, 1991

Species of fish

Hemirhamphodon tengah is a species of fish belonging to the family Zenarchopteridae. The fish is found the Indonesian part of Borneo. The fish reaches the maximum size of 33.5 millimeters (SL).

== Status ==
As of 2020, IUCN has listed Hemirhamphodon tengah as Least Concern.
