= Robert's river garfish =

Conservation status
- Critically Endangered (IUCN 3.1)

Scientific classification
- Kingdom: Animalia
- Phylum: Chordata
- Class: Actinopterygii
- Order: Beloniformes
- Family: Zenarchopteridae
- Genus: Zenarchopterus
- Species: Z. robertsi

Binomial name
- Zenarchopterus robertsi Collette, 1982

Species of fish

Robert's river garfish (Zenarchopterus robertsi) is a species of viviparous halfbeak endemic to Papua New Guinea where it is only known from the area around Kokoda. This species grows to a length of 13 centimetres (5.1 in) SL.

== Environment ==
The Robert's river garfish is known to be found in a freshwater environment within a pelagic depth range. This species lives in a tropical climate. They are known to be found in the biological area of rain forest streams. The Robert's river garfish lives in the oceania region.

== Size ==
The Robert's river garfish can reach the maximum length of 13 centimeters or about 5.11 inches as an unsexed male.

== Distribution ==
The distribution of the Robert's river garfish includes the areas of Kokoda in southeastern Papua New Guinea.

== Information ==
The Robert's river garfish serves as no threat to humans and they are considered to be harmless. This species does not have the ability to live in an aquarium or for commercial use. They can only live in freshwater and are unable to live in saltwater. The specific name honours the American ichthyologist Tyson R. Roberts.
