= Nomorhamphus towoetii =

Conservation status
- Vulnerable (IUCN 3.1)

Scientific classification
- Kingdom: Animalia
- Phylum: Chordata
- Class: Actinopterygii
- Order: Beloniformes
- Family: Zenarchopteridae
- Genus: Nomorhamphus
- Species: N. towoetii

Binomial name
- Nomorhamphus towoetii Ladiges, 1972

Species of fish

Nomorhamphus towoetii is a species of fish in the family Hemiramphidae.

== Information ==
Nomorhamphus towoetii is endemic to Indonesia. This species can be found in a freshwater system. Facts and information about the population trends about this species are limited and not details are lacking about population. This species is recorded to be found in the Lake Towuti system in central Sulawesi, Indonesia. It is considered to be an endangered species due to the fact that it has a limited and restricted extent of occurrence within five locations. There are major threats within a few of these locations as well.

== Threats ==
The threats to the population of Nomorhamphus towoetii include the following:

- expansion of human population
- pollution by nearby nickel mines
- disturbance from a hydro-electric power station
- exotic fish invasions in the lakes
- logging in the forests
- increase sediment in the lake
