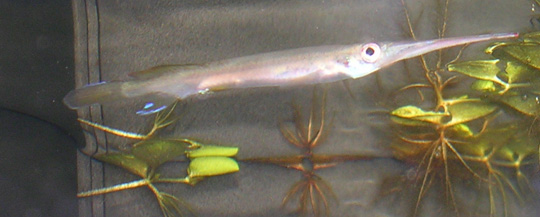
- Subadult female H. pogonognathus, about 4 cm (1.6 in) long. This species clearly shows the extended lower jaw that provides halfbeaks with their common name.

Scientific classification
- Kingdom: Animalia
- Phylum: Chordata
- Class: Actinopterygii
- Order: Beloniformes
- Family: Zenarchopteridae
- Genus: Hemirhamphodon; Bleeker, 1865

Type species
- Hemirhamphus phaiosoma Bleeker, 1852

= Hemirhamphodon =

Genus of fishes

Hemirhamphodon is a genus of viviparous halfbeak fish. Most recognized species are endemic to lowland forest streams, rivers and swamps in Borneo (often in areas with peat), but H. phaiosoma and H. pogonognathus are also found elsewhere in Southeast Asia. The largest species reaches about 10 cm (4 in) in length. These fish are viviparous (with the exception of oviparious H. tengah) and are sometimes kept as aquarium fish, but otherwise have no commercial value.

== Species ==
There are currently nine recognized species in this genus:

- Hemirhamphodon byssus H. H. Tan & K. K. P. Lim, 2013
- Hemirhamphodon chrysopunctatus Brembach, 1978
- Hemirhamphodon kapuasensis Collette, 1991
- Hemirhamphodon kecil H. H. Tan & K. K. P. Lim, 2013
- Hemirhamphodon kuekenthali Steindachner, 1901
- Hemirhamphodon phaiosoma (Bleeker, 1852)
- Hemirhamphodon pogonognathus (Bleeker, 1853)
- Hemirhamphodon sesamum H. H. Tan & K. K. P. Lim, 2013
- Hemirhamphodon tengah Collette, 1991

== See also ==
- Live-bearing aquarium fish
