= Tondanichthys kottelati =

Conservation status
- Critically Endangered (IUCN 3.1)

Scientific classification
- Kingdom: Animalia
- Phylum: Chordata
- Class: Actinopterygii
- Order: Beloniformes
- Family: Zenarchopteridae
- Genus: Tondanichthys; Collette, 1995
- Species: T. kottelati

Binomial name
- Tondanichthys kottelati Collette, 1995

Species of fish

Tondanichthys kottelati is a species of viviparous halfbeak endemic to Indonesia, where it is only known from Lake Tondano near Mount Tondano in the far north of the island of Sulawesi. It grows to a length of 6.4 centimetres (2.5 in) SL. Despite being a member of the viviparous halfbeak family, this species is believed to be oviparous. This species was described in 1995 by Bruce Baden Collette and its species name honours the Swiss ichthyologist Maurice Kottelat.
