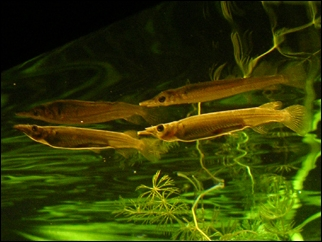
- Wrestling halfbeaks in an aquarium

Conservation status
- Data Deficient (IUCN 3.1)

Scientific classification
- Kingdom: Animalia
- Phylum: Chordata
- Class: Actinopterygii
- Order: Beloniformes
- Family: Zenarchopteridae
- Genus: Dermogenys
- Species: D. pusilla

Binomial name
- Dermogenys pusilla Kuhl & van Hasselt, 1823

Synonyms
- Hemiramphus fluviatilis Bleeker, 1850

= Wrestling halfbeak =

Species of fish

The wrestling halfbeak (Dermogenys pusilla) also known as Malayan halfbeak is a species of viviparous halfbeak native to the fresh and brackish waters of rivers and coastal regions in South-East Asia, in Singapore, Indonesia, Thailand, Malaysia, Borneo and Sumatra. It is a small, slender, livebearing fish, with the elongated lower jaw characteristic of its family. The colour of this species varies, depending on where the specimen is found. It is the type species of the genus Dermogenys.

Wrestling halfbeaks are surface-feeding fish and feed on a variety of small invertebrates including crustaceans and insect larvae, but especially mosquito larvae and flying insects that have fallen onto the surface of the water. As with all halfbeaks, the upper jaw lifts upwards when the fish is opening its mouth. Wrestling halfbeaks are livebearing fish, the females giving birth to around twenty offspring after a gestation period of about a month.

Wrestling halfbeaks are sexually dimorphic. The females are larger than the males and grow up to 7 cm (3 in) long; males only reach about 5.5 cm (2.2 in) and typically has red or yellow patches on the dorsal fin and the beak. The males of wrestling halfbeaks will fight among themselves by locking jaws, hence their name, for up to thirty minutes.

This species was described as Dermogenys pusillus by Heinrich Kuhl and Johan Coenraad van Hasselt in 1823 with the type locality given as Bogor, Java, the name was subsequently amended to the feminine form.

== Fish fighting ==
In the wild, and in large aquaria, the weaker male will quickly disengage and swim away, and fights therefore rarely result in serious injury to either party. However, in their native range, local people sometimes use wrestling halfbeaks as fighting fish for betting purposes (like fighting cocks or siamese fighting fish).

== Wrestling halfbeaks in aquaria ==
Wrestling halfbeaks, as well as other species in the genus Dermogenys, are quite widely traded as aquarium fish, sometimes under the "silver halfbeak" or "golden halfbeak" names, depending on the colouration of the fish. As with all freshwater halfbeaks, these fish are sensitive to sudden changes in pH and hardness, but they are otherwise adaptable, and can be maintained in anything from soft and acid freshwater through to slightly brackish water. When first introduced into the aquarium, wrestling halfbeaks are nervous fish that tend to be timid. They may swim frantically if suddenly frightened, even crashing into the walls. However, once they are used to their surroundings, they become lively, easy to care for fish.

== See also ==
- Halfbeak
- Live-bearing aquarium fish
