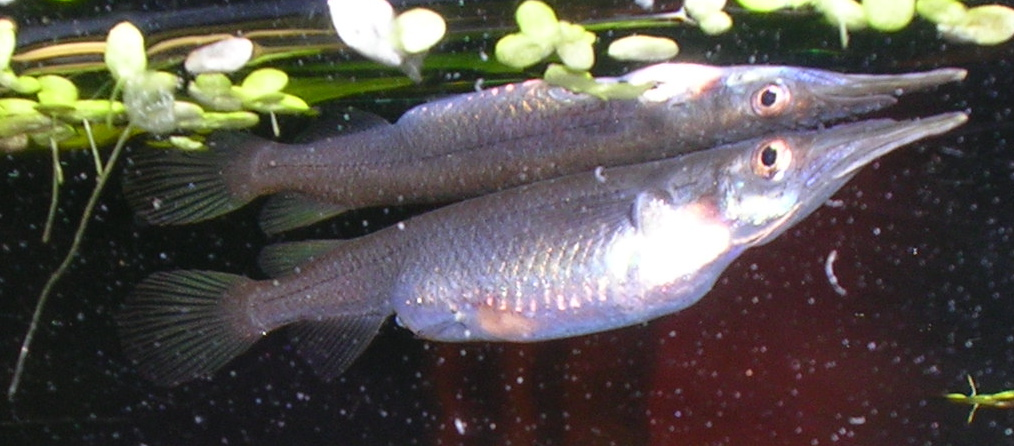
- Dermogenys sumatrana, pregnant female about 5 cm (2 in) long

Scientific classification
- Domain: Eukaryota
- Kingdom: Animalia
- Phylum: Chordata
- Class: Actinopterygii
- Order: Beloniformes
- Family: Zenarchopteridae
- Genus: Dermogenys; Kuhl & van Hasselt, 1823

Type species
- Dermogenys pusillus Kuhl & van Hasselt, 1823

= Dermogenys =

Genus of fishes

Dermogenys is a genus of viviparous halfbeaks. They are widely distributed in fresh and brackish water in South and Southeast Asia, ranging from India to the Philippines and Greater Sundas. They are all viviparous, producing small clutches of up to 30 fry that closely resemble the adults, except they are much smaller, around 1–1.5 cm (0.4–0.6 in) in length. Adults are typically around 6–7 cm (2.4–2.8 in) in length, with females being slightly larger than males. Males tend to be more brightly coloured and are well known for being aggressive towards one another. The wrestling halfbeak, D. pusilla, is widely used in Asia as fighting animals upon which wagers are placed (see Siamese fighting fish). Both sexes have lower jaws (mandibles) that are much longer than the upper ones, and from this comes the "halfbeak" name.

Dermogenys feed extensively on small insects, either in the form of aquatic larvae or as flying insects that have fallen onto the surface of the water. They are important predators on insects such as mosquitoes, so play a role in controlling malaria.

== Reproduction ==
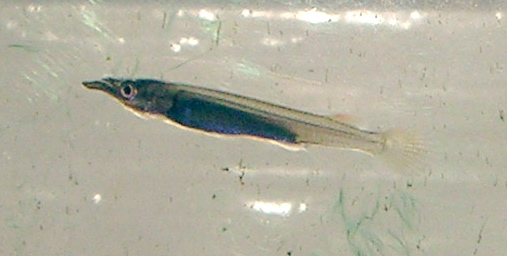
A three-week-old Dermogenys fry.

Dermogenys are live-bearing fish that practise internal fertilisation. The male is equipped with a gonopodium-like anal fin known as an andropodium that delivers sperm into the female. The gestation period is about one month. The exact mode of reproduction ranges from ovoviviparity through to viviparity (see section on reproduction in the Zenarchopteridae article). About ten embryos are developed at any one time, but at birth, these are fairly large (around 1 cm or 0.4 in) compared with other fish of this size. Dermogenys adults are around 4–7 cm (1.6–2.8 in) in length, depending on the species.

== Species ==
There are currently 12 recognized species in this genus:

- Dermogenys bispina A. D. Meisner & Collette, 1998
- Dermogenys brachynotopterus (Bleeker, 1853)
- Dermogenys bruneiensis A. D. Meisner, 2001
- Dermogenys burmanica Mukerji, 1935
- Dermogenys collettei A. D. Meisner, 2001
- Dermogenys orientalis (M. C. W. Weber, 1894)
- Dermogenys palawanensis A. D. Meisner, 2001
- Dermogenys pusilla Kuhl & van Hasselt, 1823 (Wrestling halfbeak)
- Dermogenys robertsi A. D. Meisner, 2001
- Dermogenys siamensis Fowler, 1934
- Dermogenys sumatrana (Bleeker, 1854)
- Dermogenys vogti Brembach, 1982

== See also ==
- Halfbeak
- Live-bearing aquarium fish
