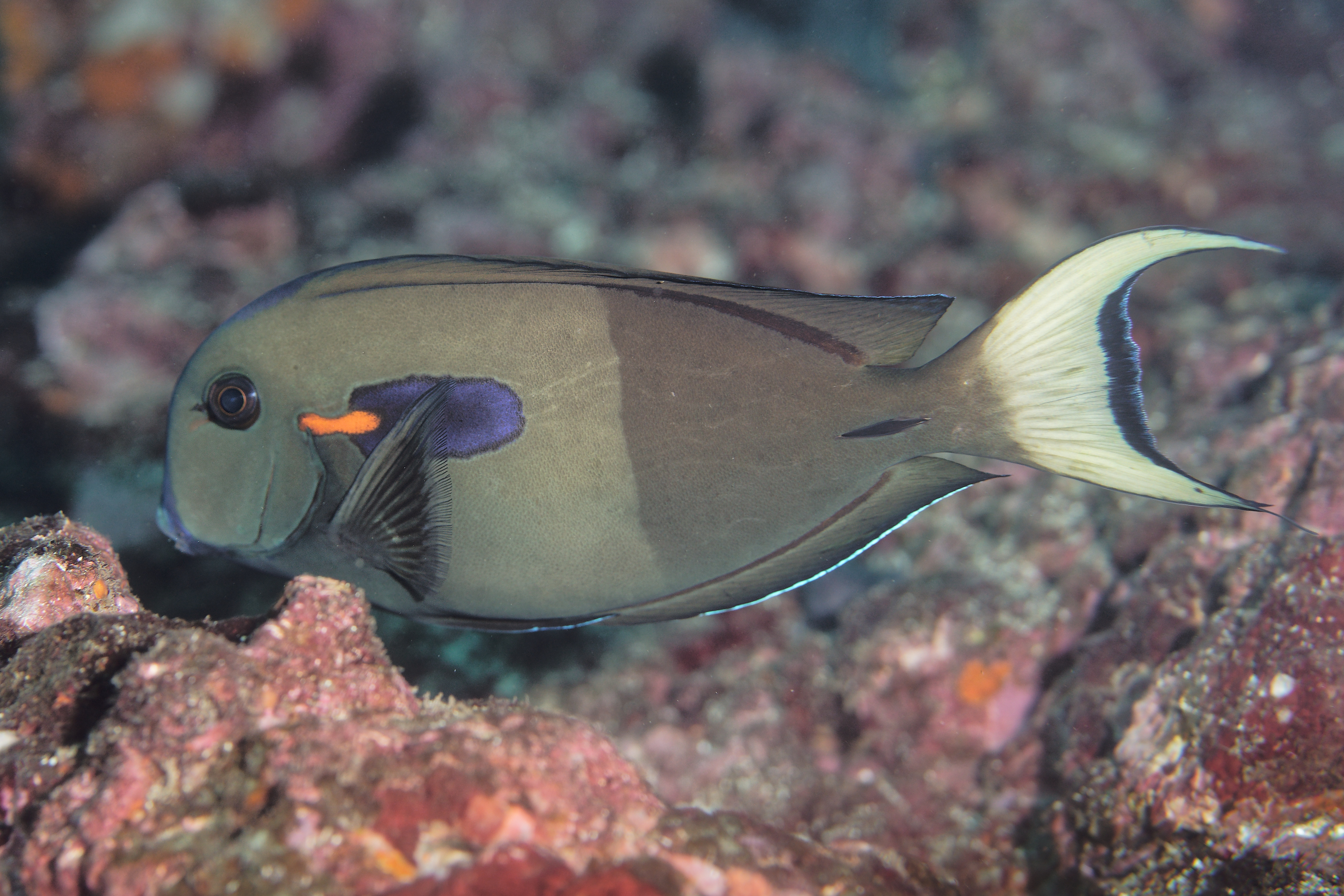
- In the Marquesas Islands

Conservation status
- Least Concern (IUCN 3.1)

Scientific classification
- Kingdom: Animalia
- Phylum: Chordata
- Class: Actinopterygii
- Order: Acanthuriformes
- Family: Acanthuridae
- Genus: Acanthurus
- Species: A. reversus

Binomial name
- Acanthurus reversus J. E. Randall & Earle, 1999

= Acanthurus reversus =

Species of fish

Acanthurus reversus is a marine species of ray-finned fish belonging to the family Acanthuridae, which includes the surgeonfishes, unicornfishes and tangs. This fish is endemic to French Polynesia.

== Taxonomy ==
Acanthurus reversus was first formally described in 1999 by the American ichthyologists John Ernest Randall and John L. Earle with its type locality given as off a point at the southern end of Marquisienne Bay, Nuku Hiva in the Marquesas Islands. This species is closely related to the widespread orangeband surgeonfish (A. olivaceus), and together these taxa form a species complex within the genus Acanthurus. The genus Acanthurus is one of two genera in the tribe Acanthurini which is one of three tribes in the subfamily Acanthurinae which is one of two subfamilies in the family Acanthuridae.

== Etymology ==
Acanthurus reversus was given the specific name reversus, this means "reversed" and refers to the reversed pattern if colours on the caudal fin of this species in comparison to the closely related A. olivaceus.

== Distribution and habitat ==
Acanthurus reversus Is endemic to the Marquesas Islands in French Polynesia. There is a record of an individual from Takaroa Atoll in the Tuamotu Archipelago but this is thought to have referred to a vagrant. The Marquesas surgeonfish is found singly or in small groups on inshore reefs at depths between 4 and 25 m (13 and 82 ft).

== Description ==
Acanthurus reversus has its dorsal fin supported by 9 spines and 24 or 25 soft rays while the anal fin is supported by 3 spines and 23 or 24 soft rays. Its overall colour is brown, although the posterior may be clearly paler than the anterior. There is an elongated orange spot running from the upper end of the gill slit With its, posterior have being surrounded by a blue band that reaches beyond the pectoral fin. There is an indistinct orange line at the base of both the dorsal and anal fins and the soft-rayed part of the dorsal fin has 3 dark horizontal bands while the anal fin has a blue margin. The caudal fin is light yellow with a wide black band to its rear, this narrows as it reaches the filamentous part of the lobes. Juveniles are yellow and have blue margins on their dorsal and anal fins. The maximum published total length of the Marquesas surgeonfish is 34 cm (13 in).
