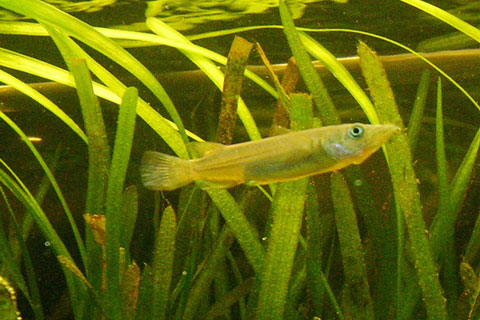
- Nomorhamphus sp. in aquarium

Scientific classification
- Kingdom: Animalia
- Phylum: Chordata
- Class: Actinopterygii
- Order: Beloniformes
- Family: Zenarchopteridae
- Genus: Nomorhamphus; M. C. W. Weber & de Beaufort, 1922

Type species
- Nomorhamphus celebensis Weber & de Beaufort, 1922

Species
- 20, see text

= Nomorhamphus =

Genus of fishes

Nomorhamphus is a southeast Asian genus of viviparous halfbeaks from streams, rivers and lakes in Sulawesi (Indonesia) and the Philippines. They are all viviparous, producing small clutches of around a dozen fry about 10 to 15 mm (0.39 to 0.59 in) long at birth. Females are generally larger than the males. In the largest species, such as Nomorhamphus liemi, the females typically reach about 10 centimetres (3.9 in) in length, whereas the males reach about 6–7 cm (2.4–2.8 in) in length. Males are also more brightly coloured than the females (often having red, black, or blue patches on their fins). Compared with many other halfbeaks, the lower mandible, or beak, is relatively short, on females in particular barely protruding beyond the length of the upper mandible. The males of some species (e.g., N. ebrardtii) have short, straight beaks, but those of others (e.g., N. liemi) have short beaks that curve downwards forming a shape often compared to a goatee beard by aquarists. N. aenigma is unique within Nomorhamphus because of its lack of lower jaw elongation.

Nomorhamphus feed extensively on small insects, either in the form of aquatic larvae or as flying insects that have fallen onto the surface of the water. They are important predators on insects such as mosquitoes, so play a role in controlling malaria. Nomorhamphus are too small to be of value as food, but they do have some value as aquarium fish.

== Reproduction ==
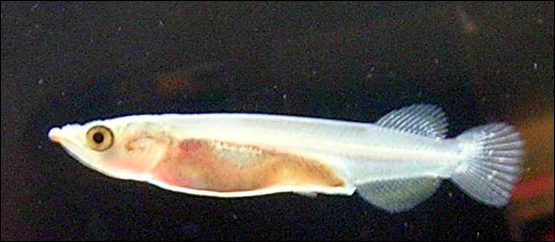
A young Nomorhamphus about seven days old and about 18 mm (0.7 in) in length, lacks the prominent beak of the adults.

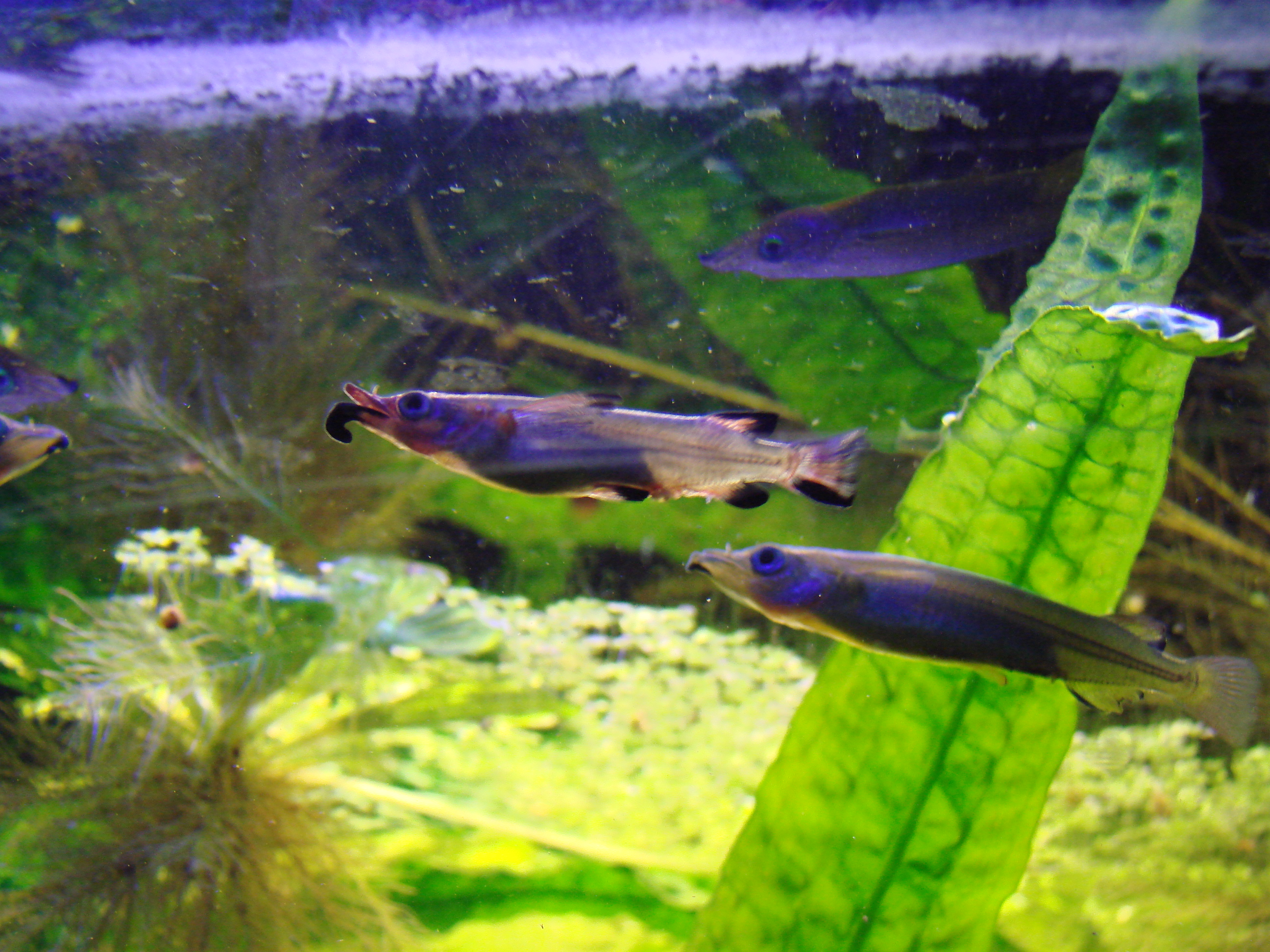
A pair of Nomorhamphus

Nomorhamphus species are livebearing fish that practise internal fertilisation. The male is equipped with a gonopodium-like anal fin known as a gonopodium that delivers sperm into the female. The gestation period is about six weeks. The exact mode of reproduction ranges from ovoviviparity through to viviparity, and in some species, oophagy is known, as well. Only around ten to twenty embryos are developed at a time, but at birth these are fairly large (around 13 millimetres or 0.5 inches) and well developed, able to take small prey, such as Daphnia, immediately after birth.

== Species ==
There are currently 22 recognized species in this genus:

- Nomorhamphus aenigma Kobayashi, Masengi & Yamahira, 2020
- Nomorhamphus bakeri Fowler & Bean, 1922
- Nomorhamphus brembachi Vogt, 1978
- Nomorhamphus celebensis Weber & de Beaufort, 1922 (Poso halfbeak)
- Nomorhamphus ebrardtii Popta, 1912
- Nomorhamphus hageni Popta, 1912
- Nomorhamphus kolonodalensis Meisner & Louie, 2000
- Nomorhamphus lanceolatus Huylebrouck, Hadiaty & Herder, 2014
- Nomorhamphus liemi Vogt, 1978
- Nomorhamphus manifesta Meisner, 2001
- Nomorhamphus megarrhamphus Brembach, 1982
- Nomorhamphus pectoralis Fowler, 1934
- Nomorhamphus philippinus Ladiges, 1972
- Nomorhamphus pinnimaculatus Meisner, 2001
- Nomorhamphus ravnaki Brembach, 1991
- Nomorhamphus rex Huylebrouck, Hadiaty & Herder, 2012
- Nomorhamphus rossi Meisner, 2001
- Nomorhamphus sagittarius Huylebrouck, Hadiaty & Herder, 2014
- Nomorhamphus sanussii Brembach, 1991
- Nomorhamphus towoetii Ladiges, 1972
- Nomorhamphus versicolor Kraemer, Hadiaty & Herder, 2019
- Nomorhamphus vivipara Peters, 1865
- Nomorhamphus weberi Boulenger, 1897
