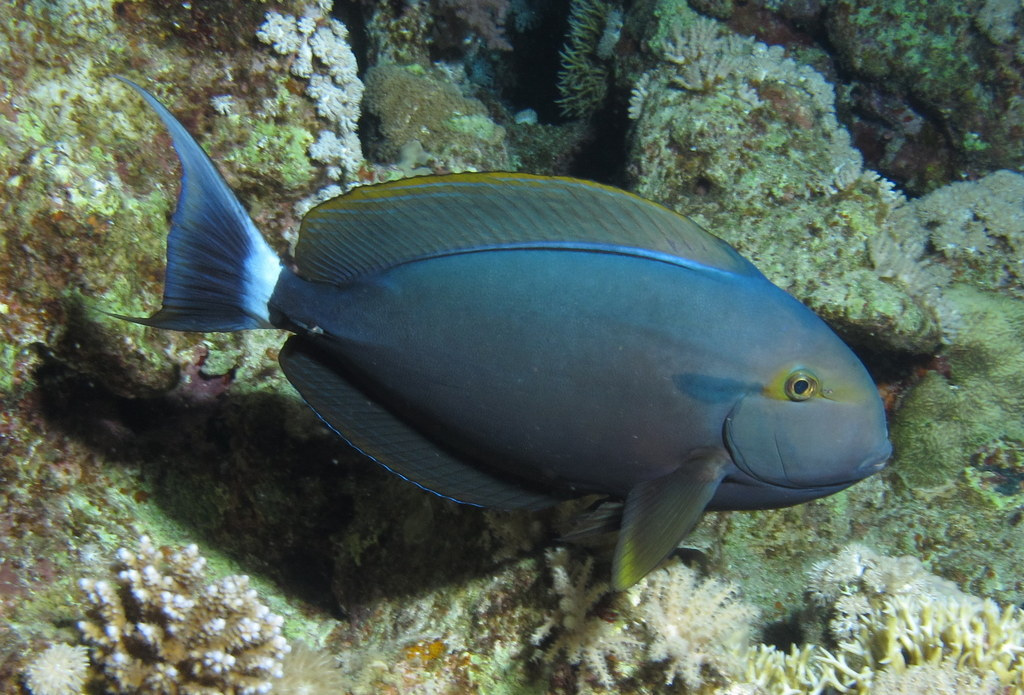

Conservation status
- Least Concern (IUCN 3.1)

Scientific classification
- Kingdom: Animalia
- Phylum: Chordata
- Class: Actinopterygii
- Division: Teleostei
- Order: Acanthuriformes
- Family: Acanthuridae
- Genus: Acanthurus
- Species: A. gahhm

Binomial name
- Acanthurus gahhm (Gmelin, 1789)

Synonyms
- Chaetodon nigrofuscus gahhm Gmelin, 1789

= Acanthurus gahhm =

Species of fish

Acanthurus gahhm, the black surgeonfish, monk surgeonfish or lined surgeonfish, is a species of marine ray-finned fish belonging to the family Acanthuridae, the surgeonfishes, unicornfishes or tangs. This fish is found in the western Indian Ocean.

== Taxonomy ==
Acanthurus gahhm was first formally described in 1789 by the German naturalist Johann Friedrich Gmelin with its type locality not being given but is thought to be the Red Sea. The genus Acanthurus is one of two genera in the tribe Acanthurini which is one of three tribes in the subfamily Acanthurinae which is one of two subfamilies in the family Acanthuridae.

== Etymology ==
Acanthurus gahhm has a specific name, gahhm, which is an Arabic word for surgeonfish in the Red Sea. It was thought to have been used by Peter Forsskål in 1755 but was described as an Arabic common name and not used as a valid specific name until Gmelin used it in 1789.

== Description ==
This fish reaches up to 50 centimeters in length. It is oval in shape and laterally compressed. Like other surgeonfishes, it swims with its pectoral fins. The caudal fin has a crescent shape. The mouth is small and pointed. The body is black to dark brown, with a white ring around the base of the tail and a yellow stripe around the eyes. The pectoral fins are tipped with yellow.

== Distribution ==
Acanthurus gahhm is found in the north-western Indian Ocean where it is endemic to the Red Sea and the Gulf of Aden, records farther east are likely to be misidentifications of A. nigricauda.

== Biology ==
This is a demersal fish. It lives on reefs and in lagoons and other sandy areas up to 40 meters deep.

This species is omnivorous, feeding on algae, zooplankton and other small invertebrates, and detritus. It is active during the day and may swim in groups or remain solitary.

== Uses ==
This species is kept in aquaria and harvested for food.
