= Erna Mohr =

German zoologist (1894–1968)

- Born: July 11, 1894; Hamburg, German Empire
- Died: September 10, 1968 (aged 74); Hamburg, West Germany
- Scientific career
- Fields: Mammalogy; Ichthyology
- Institutions: Zoological Museum Hamburg

Erna W. Mohr (July 11, 1894 – September 10, 1968) was a German zoologist who made contributions to ichthyology and mammalogy. Mohr was long associated with the Zoological Museum Hamburg, where she was successively head of the Fish Biology Department, Department of Higher Vertebrates, and Curator of the Vertebrate Department. She was a member of the Academy of Sciences Leopoldina and held an honorary doctorate from the Ludwig-Maximilians-Universität München.

Mohr was born in Hamburg, the daughter of a school teacher, and aside from some time in Schleswig-Holstein lived for most of her life in Hamburg. Between 1914 and 1934 she taught high school while volunteering at the Zoological Museum Hamburg and also published scholarly and popular scientific articles. At the Zoological Museum she began working with Ernst Ehrenbaum on age determination in fishes, where she is credited to have been the first to use ctenoid scales to estimate age. She later worked with Georg Duncker on fish taxonomy, including works on the viviparous halfbeaks (Zenarchopteridae), sand lances (Ammodytidae) and shrimpfish (Centriscidae). After Duncker's retirement in 1934, Mohr became head of the Fish Biology department, and in 1936 became head of the Department of Higher Vertebrates. She became Curator of the Vertebrate Department in 1946.

She also worked extensively with mammals, publishing on rodents, seals, hoofed-mammals, and other groups. She became a member of the American Society of Mammalogists in 1928, (Note: Mohr's membership was temporarily dropped in the late 1940s due to her inability to send membership dues during and following World War II.) and in 1959 she wrote a monograph on the endangered Przewalski's horse, a "pre-emininet compendium... that can never be surpassed for its firsthand accounts of the early history of the species". She compiled studbooks for the Przewalski's horse and European bison, and was active in reintroduction efforts for the latter.

Mohr produced over 400 publications during her career. She received an honorary doctorate from the Ludwig-Maximilians-Universität München in 1950. In 1966 she was elected an Honorary Member of the American Society of Mammalogists, the Society's most esteemed honor, and as of 1996 was the only woman to have been so rewarded.

Mohr died in Hamburg in 1968. She was buried in the Ohlsdorf Cemetery's Garden of Women, with a statue of a hutia (a large rodent) marking her grave.

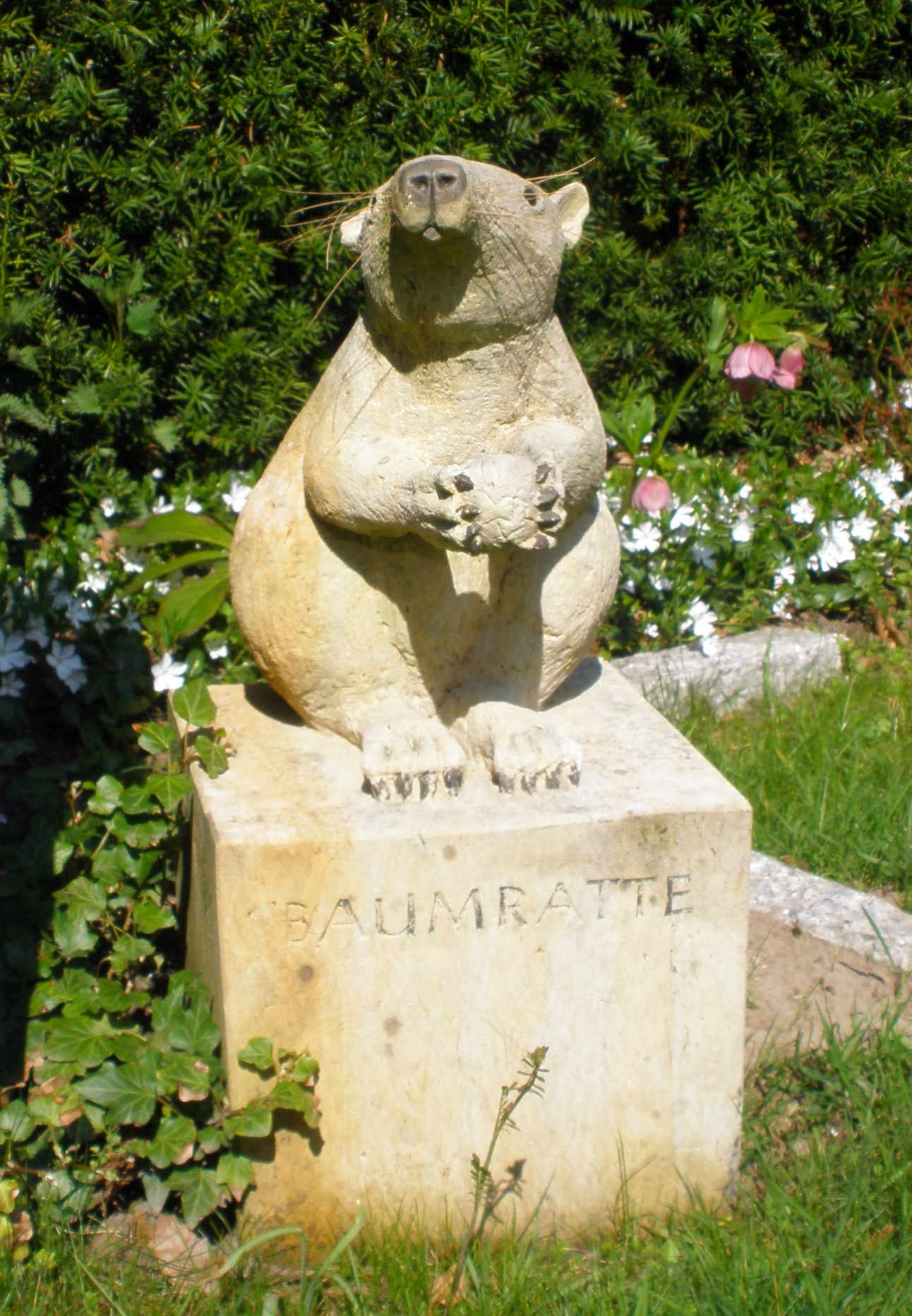
A hutia statue stands beside Mohr's grave in Ohlsdorf Cemetery.

== Legacy ==
A species of fossil salamander (Grippiella mohrae) and bat mite (Ichoronyssus mohrae) were named after Mohr. In 1984, on what would have been her 90th birthday, a street in Neuallermöhe, Hamburg, was named Erna Mohr Kehre ("Erna Mohr Turn").

Starting from the German Enzyklopädie der Tiere ("Encyclopedia of the animals") edited by Wilhelm Eigener and publisher by Westermann Verlag in 1971 for its first edition, Mohr wrote the mammal's section of the 2 Volumes Enciclopedia degli Animali (Capitol editions, Bologna, 1980).

== See also ==
- Category:Taxa named by Erna Mohr
