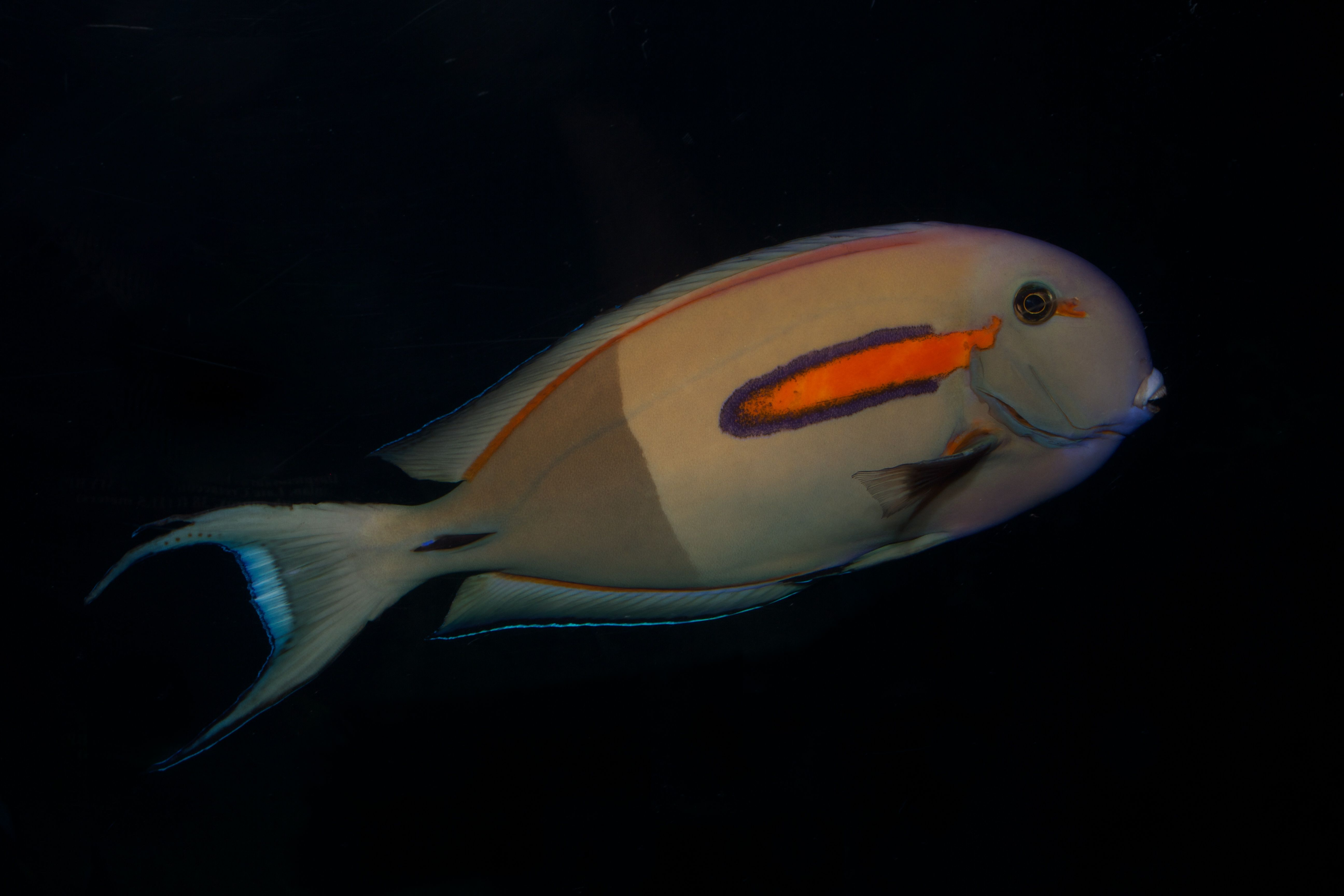

Conservation status
- Least Concern (IUCN 3.1)

Scientific classification
- Kingdom: Animalia
- Phylum: Chordata
- Class: Actinopterygii
- Order: Acanthuriformes
- Family: Acanthuridae
- Genus: Acanthurus
- Species: A. olivaceus

Binomial name
- Acanthurus olivaceus Bloch & Schneider, 1801

Synonyms
- List: Hepatus olivaceus (Bloch & Schneider, 1801); Rhombotides olivaceus (Bloch & Schneider, 1801); Teuthis olivaceus (Bloch & Schneider, 1801); Acanthurus chrysosoma Bleeker, 1857; Hepatus chrysosoma (Bleeker, 1857); Acanthurus eparai Lesson, 1831; Acanthurus erythromelas Swainson, 1839; Ctenodon erythromelas (Swainson, 1839); Acanthurus humeralis Valenciennes, 1835; Harpurus paroticus Forster, 1844; Rhombotides xanthosoma Bleeker, 1865

= Acanthurus olivaceus =

Species of fish

Acanthurus olivaceus, the orange-band surgeonfish, orange-shoulder surgeonfish or orangebar tang, is a species of marine ray-finned fish in the family Acanthuridae, the surgeonfishes, unicornfishes and tangs. It lives in the tropical waters of the Indo-Pacific.

== Taxonomy ==
Acanthurus olivaceus was first formally described in 1801 by the German naturalists Marcus Elieser Bloch and Johann Gottlob Theaenus Schneider with its type locality given as Tahiti in the Society Islands. This species is closely related with the range-restricted Marquesas surgeonfish (A. reversus), and together these taxa form a species complex within the genus Acanthurus. The genus Acanthurus is one of two genera in the tribe Acanthurini, which is one of three tribes in the subfamily Acanthurinae which, together with Nasinae, forms the family Acanthuridae.

== Description ==
Like most other surgeonfish species, the orange-band surgeonfish is a deep-bodied, laterally-compressed oval fish. It is over twice as long as it is deep, with a maximum length of 35 cm (14 in), although a more typical length is 25 cm (10 in). Both the dorsal and the anal fins are long and low, extending as far as the caudal peduncle. The dorsal fin has 9 spines and 23 to 25 soft rays while the anal fin has 3 spines and 22 to 24 soft rays. The tail fin is strongly lunate, with the tips growing longer as the fish gets older. The adult fish is greyish-brown, and the paler front half of the fish very abruptly changes to the darker hind portion. There is a distinctive orange bar with a purplish-black margin immediately behind the top of the operculum, and there are blue and orange lines at certain fin bases. Like all other surgeonfishes, this species has a pair of scalpel-like scales that project upward from the caudal peduncle. Larger males develop a convex snout which clearly differentiates them from females. Juvenile fish are yellow.

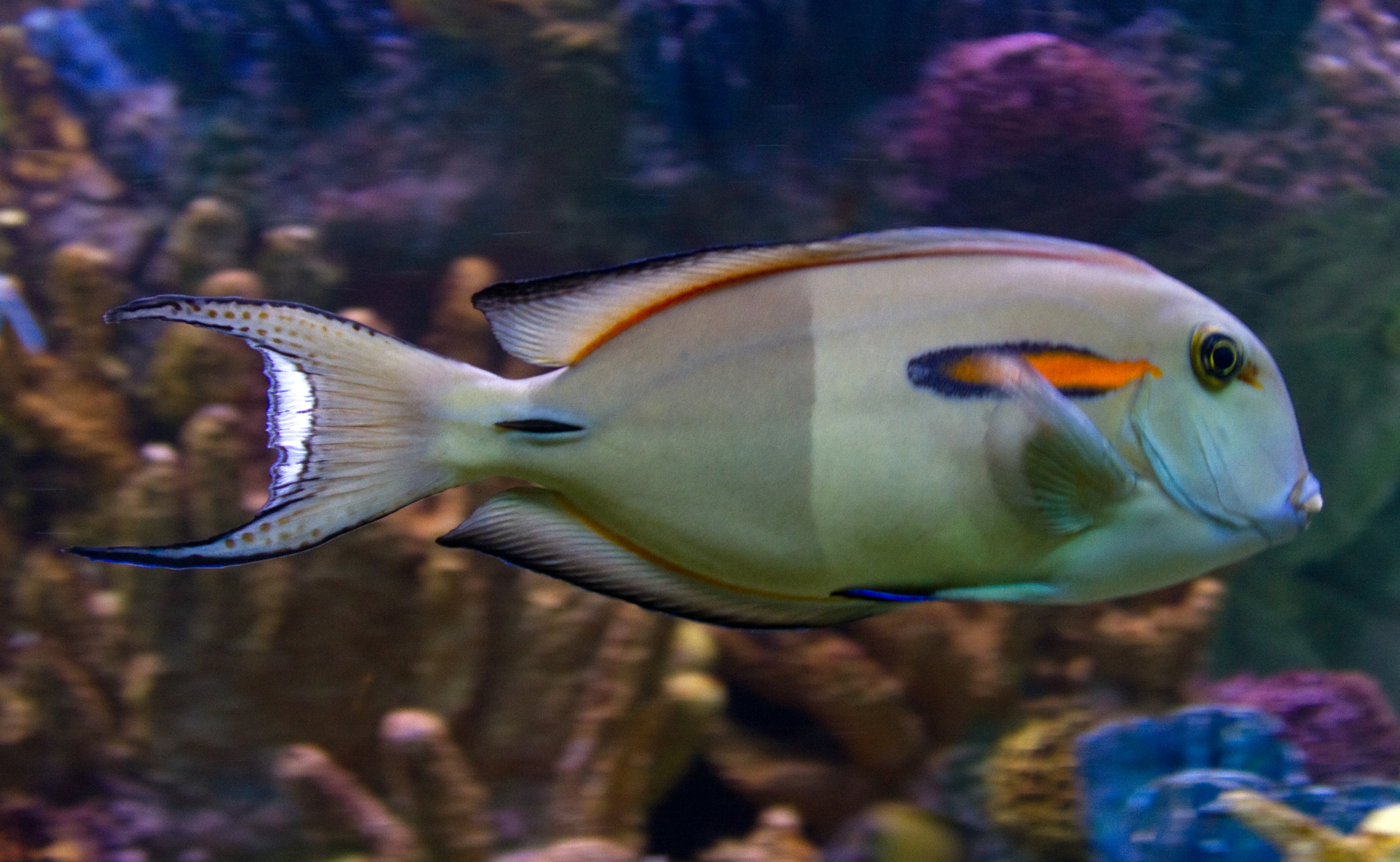
In captivity

== Distribution and habitat ==
The orange-band surgeonfish is found in the tropical eastern Indian Ocean and the western Pacific Ocean. Its range extends from Christmas Island and the Cocos Islands to southern Japan, Australia (except the southern coast), Indonesia, the Philippines and Hawaii. It is associated with reefs, often found on outer slopes and in more exposed locations. As adult, it is a solitary fish, but sometimes joins schools. The adult depth range is between about 9–46 m (30–151 ft), but juveniles are found in shallower water in sheltered locations in small groups.

== Ecology ==
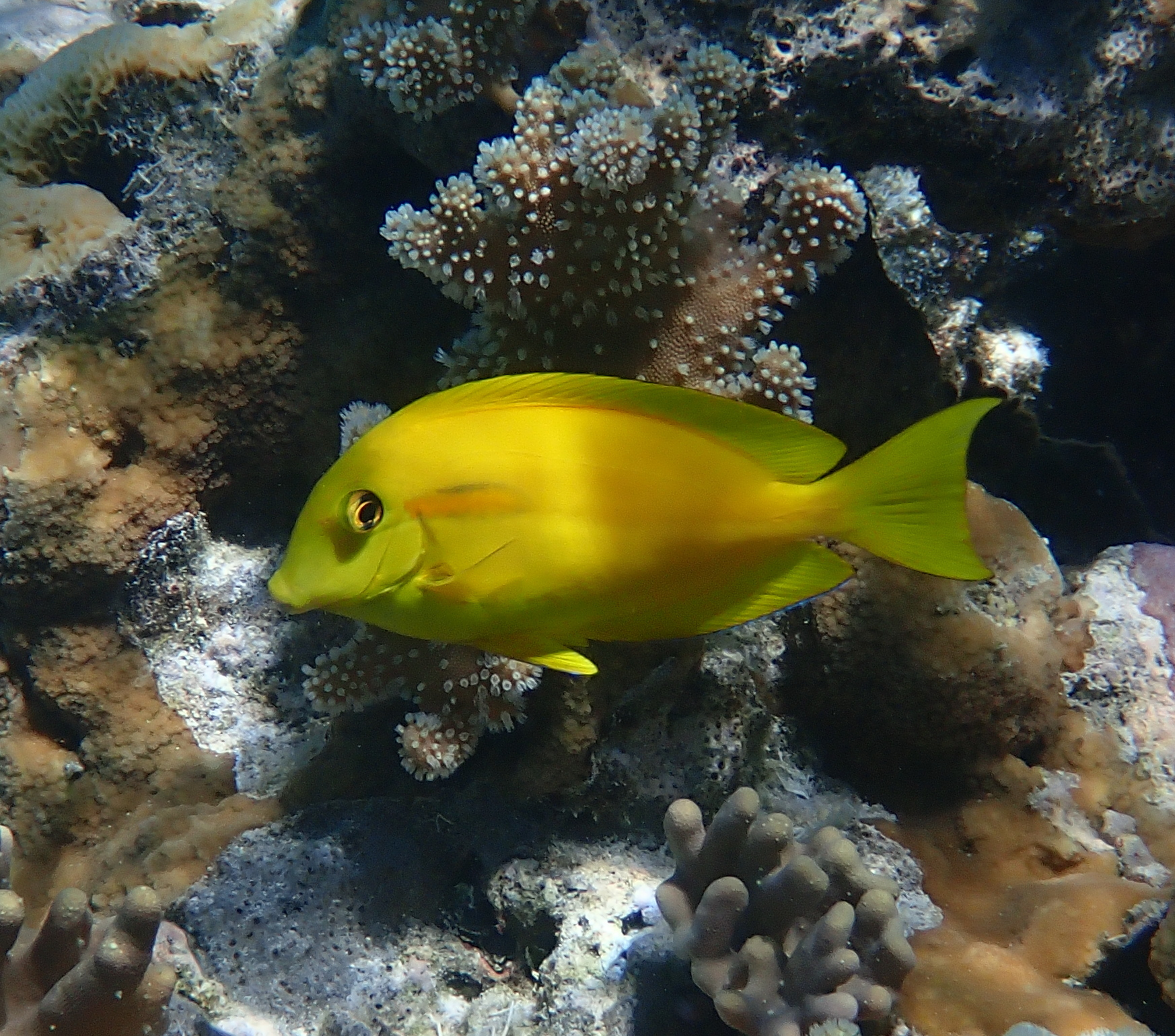
Young specimen in Vanuatu

The orange-band surgeonfish feeds on detritus and on algae growing on the seabed, as well as the film of diatoms and filamentous algae that grows on sand and other substrates. It often forms schools with parrotfish, tangs and other surgeonfishes with similar diets; their grazing is important in maintaining coral reef habitats, since it keeps rocks free from excessive growth of algae, so that coral larvae can find suitable place to settle.

== Status ==
The orange-band surgeonfish has a wide distribution in the tropical Indo-Pacific region and is moderately common. It is sometimes found in fish markets and in the aquarium trade, but is targeted by fisheries. No particular threat has been recognized, so the IUCN has listed its as a Least Concern species.
