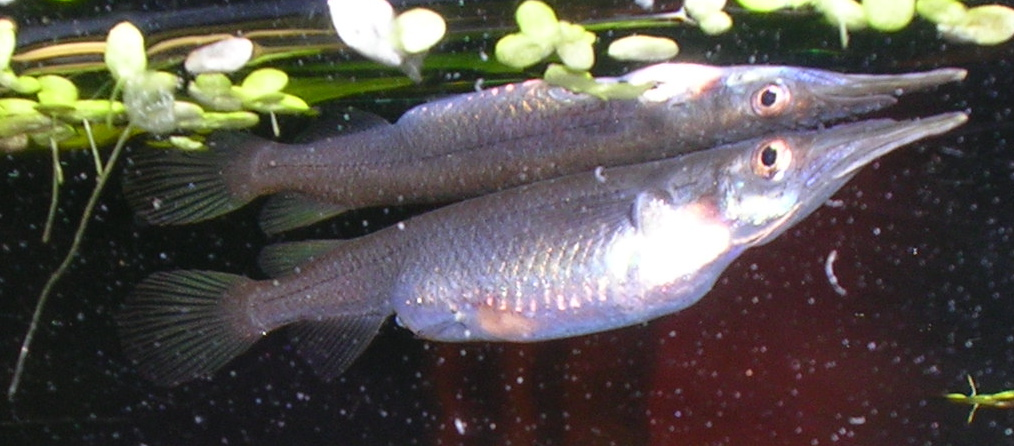
- Female Dermogenys sumatrana a day or so before giving birth.

Scientific classification
- Kingdom: Animalia
- Phylum: Chordata
- Class: Actinopterygii
- Order: Beloniformes
- Superfamily: Exocoetoidea
- Family: Zenarchopteridae; Fowler, 1934

Genera
- See text

= Zenarchopteridae =

Family of fishes

Zenarchopteridae, the viviparous halfbeaks, is a family of ray-finned fishes in the order Beloniformes. The Zenarchopteridae exhibit strong sexual dimorphism, practicing internal fertilisation, and in some cases ovoviviparous or viviparous (the family also includes oviparous species). The members in the family are mainly found in fresh and brackish water of tropical Asia and New Guinea, but the genus Zenarchopterus also includes marine species from the Indo-Pacific. Several, such as the wrestling halfbeak, have become commonly traded aquarium fish.

== Genera ==
The following genera are classified within the family Zenarchopteridae

- Dermogenys Kuhl & van Hasselt, 1823
- Hemirhamphodon Bleeker, 1865
- Nomorhamphus Weber & de Beaufort, 1922
- Tondanichthys Collette, 1995
- Zenarchopterus Gill, 1864

== Behaviour ==
Viviparous halfbeaks vary in social behavior from open water schooling fish similar to the marine halfbeaks (family Hemiramphidae), as with species of Zenarchopterus, through to much more aggressive and combative fishes, as is best known from the "wrestling" halfbeaks of genus Dermogenys. These non-schoolers prefer to lurk among aquatic plants such as reeds, dead trees, and artificial structures of various types; from where they wait for small prey animals to drift by or alight on the surface, before darting from their hiding place to hunt. Notably, they feed extensively on female mosquitoes that are laying their eggs in the water, making them much better at mosquito control that species like guppies and mosquitofish that only take mosquito larvae.

== Feeding ==
Viviparous halfbeaks are more predatory than the marine species, and typically orient themselves into the current and take aquatic insect larvae, such as midge larvae, and small insects, such as flies that have fallen on the surface of the water, particularly mosquitoes and spiders.

== Breeding ==
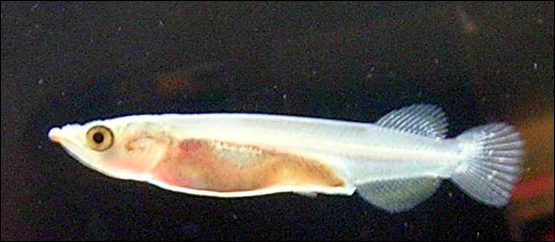
Young fresh water halfbeak, Nomorhamphus sp., aged 7 days, approximately 18 mm (0.71 in) in length. Captive bred specimen.

Members of the genus Zenarchopterus and presumably the poorly-known Tondanichthys are oviparous.

The fresh and brackish water halfbeaks of the genera Dermogenys, Hemirhamphodon, and Nomorhamphus are all livebearers (with the exception of the oviparous H. tengah), that is, they produce well-developed free-swimming young. However, there is a great deal of variation in the details. Meisner and Burns identified no fewer than five distinct modes of viviparity and ovoviviparity in fresh and brackish water halfbeaks:

Type	Egg location	Superfetation (sperm storage)	Yolk sac	Maternal connection	Broods per mating	Example	Notes
1	ovarian follicle	No	Large	None	-	Southeast Asian populations of Dermogenys pusilla	
2	ovarian follicle	Yes	Small	via the coelomic cavity and pericardial sac	3	Dermogenys pusilla from Sabah and Dermogenys orientalis	
3	ovarian follicle, briefly, then along full ovary length	Yes	Small	Via expanded belly sac	2	Dermogenys viviparus	
4	ovarian follicle, briefly, then along full ovary length	No	Large	No		Nomorhamphus megarrhamphus, Nomorhamphus weberi, and Nomorhamphus towoetii	
5	ovarian follicle, briefly, then along full ovary length	Yes	Small	Partial		Nomorhamphus ebrardtii	Late-stage embryos are oophagous (eating eggs and small embryos) like sharks and a few other fishes.

As with other livebearing fish, fresh and brackish water halfbeaks produce small broods of large offspring compared with egg-laying species of similar size, with broods of around ten to twenty, typically 10–15 millimeters (0.39–0.59 in) long.

=== Sexual dimorphism ===
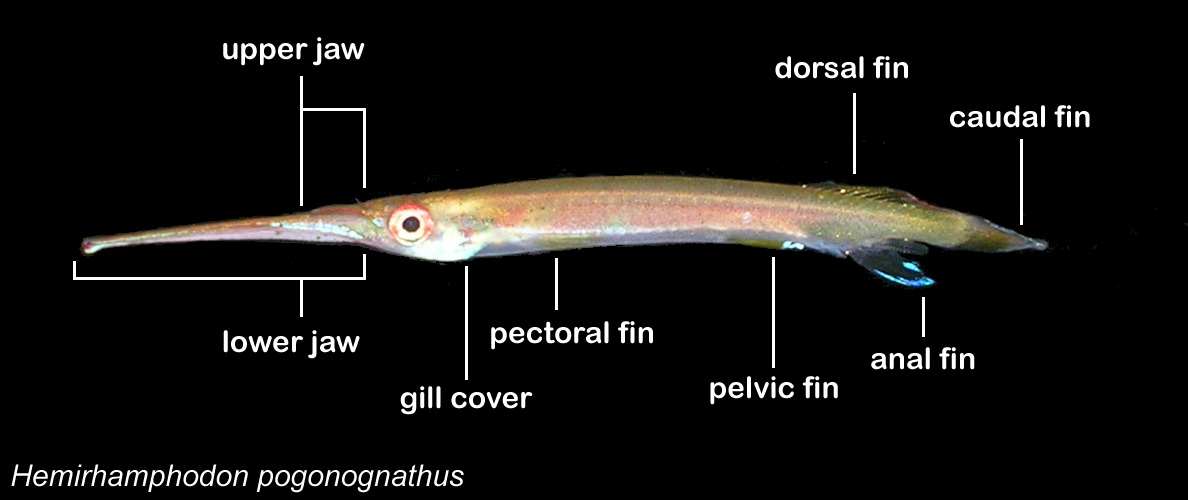
Hemirhamphodon pogonognathus with key morphological features labelled; note the great length of the lower jaw compared with the upper jaw.

Sexual dimorphism is apparent in some species. Males of the ovoviviparous and viviparous species all have a modified anal fin, the andropodium, similar to the gonopodium of poecilid livebearers, used to deliver sperm to the females. Although most egg laying species mate by shedding the milt externally, as is typical for bony fish, at least some practice internal fertilization: male Zenarchopterus use a modified anal fin to direct sperm into the genital opening of the female prior to spawning.

Besides modifications to the anal fin, other differences include size, coloration, and the beak's length or shape. Female Normorhamphus are much larger than males but aren't as brightly colored and have shorter beaks. By contrast, male Hemirhamphodon are larger than females, and some species, such as Hemirhamphodon pogonognathus, also have a long beard-like tassel on the end of the beak. Small colored patches, particularly among males, are only found on the fins and the tip of the beak.

=== Gambling ===
They are small and generally peaceful towards other species, although males can be aggressive to one another. Dermogenys pusillius, the wrestling halfbeak, in particular fight vigorously. Battles may end in injuries. In some Asian countries gamblers bet on the outcomes, as they do with Siamese fighting fish.

=== In the aquarium ===
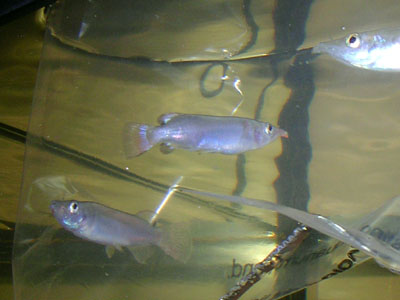
Nomorhamphus liemi liemi halfbeaks ready for introduction to a new aquarium.

Some of the fresh and brackish water species are kept as ornamental aquarium fish, particularly genera Dermogenys and Nomorhamphus, but also Hemirhamphodon and Zenarchopterus, less commonly.

To be kept successfully, halfbeaks require an aquarium with plenty of space at the surface. Depth is not critical, so a wide tank is better than a deep one. They are sensitive to low oxygen levels but are otherwise relatively hardy, except that they are intolerant of sudden changes in salinity, pH, hardness, or temperature. Consequently, they must be introduced to a new aquarium gently, and small but frequent water changes are best, so the water chemistry does not change suddenly. A few species, most notably Dermogenys pusillius, have traditionally been kept in slightly brackish water, though some authors aver that those found in brackish water are estuarine juveniles. Most traded species of Nomorhamphus and Hemirhamphodon prefer soft, neutral to slightly acidic, fresh water conditions.

Halfbeaks are sensitive and shocks like sudden changes in illumination can evoke frantic swimming activity. They may crash into the glass, injuring their beaks, or jump out of the tank. Such beak injuries usually heal within a few weeks. They will eat insect larvae such as bloodworms readily, as well as crustacean eggs, shrimp, fruit flies, and small pieces of chopped white fish. Halfbeaks sometimes eat flake foods as well. Some aquarists also offer them tiny pieces of algae wafer on the basis that most species are omnivorous in the wild, and so plant food probably suits them.

Halfbeaks breed in captivity, but despite being livebearers not easily. Miscarriages are common, particularly if the females are stressed (for example, by being moved to another aquarium). Once the fry have been born, the large babies eat newly hatched brine shrimp, small live foods such as daphnia, and powdered flake.

== Conservation status ==
A number of fresh water halfbeaks are listed in various categories on the IUCN Red List assessing their risk of extinction. None of these species are traded as aquarium fish. Most are simply rare in the wild, and consequently at particular risk from habitat destruction. Several species are listed as Data Deficient (and many have not been rated at all), meaning that their present status is unclear based on available information.

- Nomorhamphus megarramphus – Near Threatened
- Nomorhamphus weberi – Near Threatened
- Nomorhamphus celebensis – Endangered
- Nomorhamphus towoeti – Vulnerable
- Tondanichthys kottelati – Critically Endangered
- Zenarchopterus alleni – Data Deficient
