= T. celebensis =

T. celebensis may refer to:

- Taeromys celebensis, the Celebes rat, a rodent species
- Telmatherina celebensis, a fish species
- Tyspanodes celebensis, a moth species
