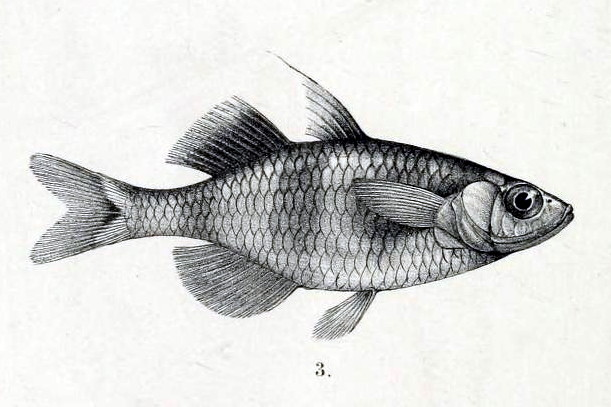
- Telmatherina celebensis

Scientific classification
- Kingdom: Animalia
- Phylum: Chordata
- Class: Actinopterygii
- Order: Atheriniformes
- Family: Telmatherinidae
- Genus: Telmatherina; Boulenger, 1897

Type species
- Telmatherina celebensis Boulenger, 1897

= Telmatherina =

Genus of fishes

Telmatherina is a genus of sailfin silversides endemic to the Indonesian island of Sulawesi. They are restricted to the Malili Lake system, consisting of the large Matano and Towuti, and the small Lontoa (Wawantoa), Mahalona and Masapi. They are also found in rivers and streams that are part of this lake system.

== Appearance and feeding ==
Telmatherina are fairly small fish, with a maximum length of 4.7–8.4 cm (1.9–3.3 in) depending on the exact species. Several of the species are highly variable, occurring in morphs that differ in morphology or colour. The various Telmatherina can be slender or high-bodied, may have rounded or pointed anal fin and second dorsal fin, and can be overall yellow, overall bluish, overall brownish, bluish with yellow fins or greenish with yellow fins.

Telmatherina typically feed on various small animals, with some species (e.g. T. sp. "thicklip") mostly eating Caridina shrimp, some species (e.g., T. antoniae small morph) mostly eating copepods, some (e.g., T. antoniae large morph) mostly eating small freshwater snails and land-living insects that end up in the water, and some (e.g., T. prognatha) mostly eating small fish and land-living insects that end up in the water. T. sarasinorum mainly feeds on eggs of fish. It may cannibalize eggs of its own species (especially male T. sarasinorum will do this if it is unclear if he has fertilized the eggs), follow spawning pairs of other Telmatherina species (especially T. antoniae) to eat their eggs, or pretend to be a male partner of a female of another Telmatherina species (especially T. antoniae) to entice her to spawn, only to eat the eggs. Two additional species, T. abendanoni and T. opudi, frequently feed on fish eggs. However, no species take only one type of prey. For example, the fish egg-eating T. sarasinorum also frequently take snails, insects and shrimp, while the fish-eating T. sp. "elongate" also frequently take shrimp, the shrimp-eating T. sp. "thicklip" also frequently eat small fish, and the snail-eating T. wahjui also take shrimp.

In general, species that mainly feed on other fish reach the greatest length and are relatively slender, while species that mainly feed on fish eggs or shrimp have a relatively high body, likely allowing them to make faster turns (necessary to catch relatively mobile shrimp, or outmaneuver fish parents when stealing their eggs). Species feeding mainly on insects or snails tend to have an intermediate body shape, being neither as slender as fish-eaters, nor as high-bodied as egg- and shrimp-eaters. Shrimp-specialists also tend to have conspicuously fleshy lips.

== Species ==
In addition to the species listed below, Marosatherina ladigesi was formerly included in Telmatherina. There are currently 10 recognized species in this genus:

- Telmatherina abendanoni M. C. W. Weber, 1913
- Telmatherina albolabiosus Tantu & Nilawati, 2008
- Telmatherina antoniae Kottelat, 1991
- Telmatherina bonti M. C. W. Weber & de Beaufort, 1922
- Telmatherina celebensis Boulenger, 1897 (Celebes Rainbow)
- Telmatherina obscura Kottelat, 1991
- Telmatherina opudi Kottelat, 1991
- Telmatherina prognatha Kottelat, 1991
- Telmatherina sarasinorum Kottelat, 1991
- Telmatherina wahjui Kottelat, 1991
