= Telmatherina antoniae =

Conservation status
- Near Threatened (IUCN 3.1)

Scientific classification
- Kingdom: Animalia
- Phylum: Chordata
- Class: Actinopterygii
- Order: Atheriniformes
- Family: Telmatherinidae
- Genus: Telmatherina
- Species: T. antoniae

Binomial name
- Telmatherina antoniae Kottelat, 1991

Species of fish

Telmatherina antoniae is a species of fish in the subfamily Telmatherininae part of the family Melanotaeniidae, the rainbowfishes. It is endemic to Indonesia where it occurs only in Lake Matano on Sulawesi.

== Etymology ==
The species was described in 1991 by Maurice Kottelat and its specific name honours his wife, Antonia.
