= Telmatherina wahjui =

Conservation status
- Endangered (IUCN 3.1)

Scientific classification
- Kingdom: Animalia
- Phylum: Chordata
- Class: Actinopterygii
- Division: Teleostei
- Order: Atheriniformes
- Family: Telmatherinidae
- Genus: Telmatherina
- Species: T. wahjui

Binomial name
- Telmatherina wahjui Kottelat, 1991

Species of fish

Telmatherina wahjui is a species of fish in the subfamily Telmatherininae, which is part of the family Melanotaeniidae; the rainbowfishes. It is endemic to Indonesia, where it occurs only in Lake Matano on the island of Sulawesi. It can reach a maximum length of around 5 centimetres (2.0 in). This species was described in 1991 by Maurice Kottelat with a type locality of Alaponkepi which is situated at the outlet of Lake Matano.

== Etymology ==
The specific name honours Beni N. Wahju who was Vice President and Secretary of P. T. Inco Industries. Mr Wahju's support was vital in ensuring that the ichthyological survey of the Malili Lakes, in which the type of this species was collected, was possible.
