= Telmatherina prognatha =

Conservation status
- Near Threatened (IUCN 3.1)

Scientific classification
- Kingdom: Animalia
- Phylum: Chordata
- Class: Actinopterygii
- Order: Atheriniformes
- Family: Telmatherinidae
- Genus: Telmatherina
- Species: T. prognatha

Binomial name
- Telmatherina prognatha Kottelat, 1991

Species of fish

Telmatherina prognatha is a species of fish in the subfamily Telmatherininae part of the family Melanotaeniidae, the rainbowfishes. It is endemic to Indonesia, where it occurs only in Lake Matano on the island of Sulawesi.

== Size ==
This species reaches a length of 8.4 cm (3.3 in).
