= Telmatherina opudi =

Conservation status
- Near Threatened (IUCN 3.1)

Scientific classification
- Kingdom: Animalia
- Phylum: Chordata
- Class: Actinopterygii
- Order: Atheriniformes
- Family: Telmatherinidae
- Genus: Telmatherina
- Species: T. opudi

Binomial name
- Telmatherina opudi Kottelat, 1991

Species of fish

Telmatherina opudi is a species of fish in the subfamily Telmatherininae part of the family Melanotaeniidae, the rainbowfishes. It is endemic to Indonesia. his species was described in 1991 by Maurice Kottelat from a type locality of Lake Matano.

== Etymology ==
Kottelat gave the species the specific name of opudi which is the local name for all the species of Telmatherina found in Lake Matano.
