= Paratherina striata =

Conservation status
- Near Threatened (IUCN 3.1)

Scientific classification
- Kingdom: Animalia
- Phylum: Chordata
- Class: Actinopterygii
- Order: Atheriniformes
- Family: Telmatherinidae
- Genus: Paratherina
- Species: P. striata

Binomial name
- Paratherina striata Aurich, 1935

Species of fish

Paratherina striata is a species of fish in the subfamily Telmatherininae, part of the rainbowfish family Melanotaeniidae. It is endemic to Indonesia where it occurs in Lakes Towuti, Wawontoa and Matano on the island of Sulawesi.
