= Telmatherina abendanoni =

Conservation status
- Near Threatened (IUCN 3.1)

Scientific classification
- Kingdom: Animalia
- Phylum: Chordata
- Class: Actinopterygii
- Order: Atheriniformes
- Family: Telmatherinidae
- Genus: Telmatherina
- Species: T. abendanoni

Binomial name
- Telmatherina abendanoni M. C. W. Weber, 1913

Species of fish

Telmatherina abendanoni is a species of fish in the subfamily Telmatherininae part of the family Melanotaeniidae, the rainbowfishes. It is endemic to Indonesia where it occurs only in Lake Matano on the island of Sulawesi.

== Etymology ==
The specific name honours the Dutch malacologist and mining engineer Eduard Cornelius Abendanon (1878-1962), who was the leader of the Central Celebes Expedition of 1907–1918, on which the type was collected.
