= Telmatherina sarasinorum =

Conservation status
- Near Threatened (IUCN 3.1)

Scientific classification
- Kingdom: Animalia
- Phylum: Chordata
- Class: Actinopterygii
- Order: Atheriniformes
- Family: Telmatherinidae
- Genus: Telmatherina
- Species: T. sarasinorum

Binomial name
- Telmatherina sarasinorum Kottelat, 1991

Species of fish

Telmatherina sarasinorum is a species of fish in the subfamily Telmatherininae part of the family Melanotaeniidae, the rainbowfishes. It is endemic to Indonesia, where it occurs only in Lake Matano on the island of Sulawesi. This species was described in 1991 by Maurice Kottelat, the types being collected at Mengonuwai on Lake Matano.

== Etymology ==
Kottelat gave the species the specific name sarasinorum in honour of the Swiss second cousins, naturalists and ethnographers Paul (1856-1929) and Fritz Sarasin (1859-1942). The Sarasins discovered Lake Matano and collected the first specimens of fishes in the genus Telmatherina.
