= Telmatherina obscura =

Conservation status
- Near Threatened (IUCN 3.1)

Scientific classification
- Kingdom: Animalia
- Phylum: Chordata
- Class: Actinopterygii
- Order: Atheriniformes
- Family: Telmatherinidae
- Genus: Telmatherina
- Species: T. obscura

Binomial name
- Telmatherina obscura Kottelat, 1991

Species of fish

Telmatherina obscura is a species of fish in the subfamily Telmatherininae part of the family Melanotaeniidae, the rainbowfishes. It is endemic to Indonesia. The species was described in 1991 by Maurice Kottelat with a type locality of Mengonuwai on Lake Matano on the island of Sulawesi.
