= Telmatherina albolabiosa =

Conservation status
- Data Deficient (IUCN 3.1)

Scientific classification
- Kingdom: Animalia
- Phylum: Chordata
- Class: Actinopterygii
- Order: Atheriniformes
- Family: Telmatherinidae
- Genus: Telmatherina
- Species: T. albolabiosa

Binomial name
- Telmatherina albolabiosa Tantu & Nilawati, 2008

Synonyms
- Telmatherina albolabiosus

Species of fish

Telmatherina albolabiosa is a species of fish in the subfamily Telmatherininae part of the family Melanotaeniidae, the rainbowfishes. It is endemic to Indonesia where it occurs only in Lake Matano on the island of Sulawesi.
