= Paratherina wolterecki =

Conservation status
- Near Threatened (IUCN 3.1)

Scientific classification
- Kingdom: Animalia
- Phylum: Chordata
- Class: Actinopterygii
- Order: Atheriniformes
- Family: Telmatherinidae
- Genus: Paratherina
- Species: P. wolterecki

Binomial name
- Paratherina wolterecki Aurich, 1935

Species of fish

Paratherina wolterecki is a species of fish in the subfamily Telmatherininae, part of the rainbowfish family Melanotaeniidae. This species is endemic to Lakes Towuti and Mahalona on the Indonesian island of Sulawesi. It reaches up to 15 cm (5.9 in) in total length. Their environment is pelagic and they live in tropical climates. It has the characteristic of having a mouth pointed upward. The specific name honours the hydrologist and biologist Richard Woltereck (1877-1944), who collected specimens of all four species in the genus Paratherina and who sketched them from life.
