= T. aurea =

T. aurea may refer to:

- Tabebuia aurea, a plant species native to South America in Suriname, Brazil, eastern Bolivia, Peru, Paraguay and northern Argentina
- Tominanga aurea, a fish species endemic to Indonesia

== See also ==
- Aurea (disambiguation)
