= Paratherina labiosa =

Conservation status
- Critically Endangered (IUCN 3.1)

Scientific classification
- Kingdom: Animalia
- Phylum: Chordata
- Class: Actinopterygii
- Order: Atheriniformes
- Family: Telmatherinidae
- Genus: Paratherina
- Species: P. labiosa

Binomial name
- Paratherina labiosa Aurich, 1935

Species of fish

Paratherina labiosa is a species of fish in the subfamily Telmatherininae, part of the rainbowfish family Melanotaeniidae. It is endemic to Lake Wawontoa on Sulawesi in Indonesia.
