= Paratherina cyanea =

Conservation status
- Near Threatened (IUCN 3.1)

Scientific classification
- Kingdom: Animalia
- Phylum: Chordata
- Class: Actinopterygii
- Order: Atheriniformes
- Family: Telmatherinidae
- Genus: Paratherina
- Species: P. cyanea

Binomial name
- Paratherina cyanea Aurich, 1935

Species of fish

Paratherina cyanea is a species of fish in the subfamily Telmatherininae, part of the rainbowfish family Melanotaeniidae. It is endemic to Indonesia where it occurs in Lakes Towuti and Mahalona on the island of Sulawesi.
