= Telmatherina bonti =

Conservation status
- Endangered (IUCN 3.1)

Scientific classification
- Kingdom: Animalia
- Phylum: Chordata
- Class: Actinopterygii
- Order: Atheriniformes
- Family: Telmatherinidae
- Genus: Telmatherina
- Species: T. bonti

Binomial name
- Telmatherina bonti M. C. W. Weber & de Beaufort, 1922

Species of fish

Telmatherina bonti is a species of fish in the subfamily Telmatherininae part of the family Melanotaeniidae, the rainbowfishes. It is endemic to Indonesia where it is found in Lake Towuti, near Malili and in Lake Mahalona all on Sulawesi.

== Etymology ==
The fish is named from "Bonti-bonti", the local name for this species at Lake Towuti, in Sulawesi, Indonesia, which is the type locality.
