= Tominanga sanguicauda =

Conservation status
- Near Threatened (IUCN 3.1)

Scientific classification
- Kingdom: Animalia
- Phylum: Chordata
- Class: Actinopterygii
- Order: Atheriniformes
- Family: Telmatherinidae
- Genus: Tominanga
- Species: T. sanguicauda

Binomial name
- Tominanga sanguicauda Kottelat, 1990

Species of fish

Tominanga sanguicauda is a species of fish in the subfamily Telmatherininae part of the family Melanotaeniidae, the rainbowfishes. It is endemic to Lake Towuti in Sulawesi, Indonesia.
