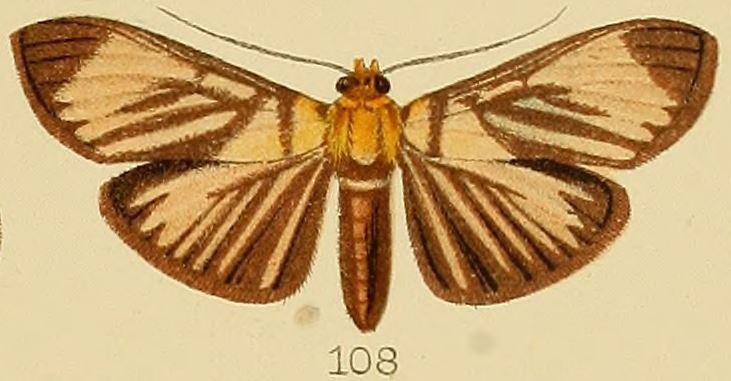

Scientific classification
- Kingdom: Animalia
- Phylum: Arthropoda
- Class: Insecta
- Order: Lepidoptera
- Family: Crambidae
- Genus: Tyspanodes
- Species: T. radiata

Binomial name
- Tyspanodes radiata Kenrick, 1907

= Tyspanodes radiata =

Species of moth

Tyspanodes radiata is a moth in the family Crambidae. It was described by George Hamilton Kenrick in 1907. It is found on New Guinea.

The wingspan is about 44 mm. The forewings are grey with whitish-hyaline patches and streaks. There is a dark spot at the base of the costa followed by pale orange, then a transverse narrow black band, after this a triangular white patch from the costa to the inner margin, veins 1 and 2 showing on this. Beyond is an irregular white patch. The apex is broadly dark grey. The hindwings are dark with whitish veins and an oval white patch beyond the middle.
