= Tyspanodes fascialis =

Scientific classification
- Kingdom: Animalia
- Phylum: Arthropoda
- Class: Insecta
- Order: Lepidoptera
- Family: Crambidae
- Genus: Tyspanodes
- Species: T. fascialis

Binomial name
- Tyspanodes fascialis (Moore, 1867)

Synonyms
- Propachys fascialis Moore, 1867

Species of moth

Tyspanodes fascialis is a moth in the family Crambidae. It was described by Frederic Moore in 1867. It is found in India (Sikkim, Bengal).

The wingspan is about 28 mm. The interspaces below and beyond the cell on the forewings are streaked with black and there is a large black patch on the middle of the outer area. The hindwings are black.
