= Tyspanodes gracilis =

Scientific classification
- Kingdom: Animalia
- Phylum: Arthropoda
- Class: Insecta
- Order: Lepidoptera
- Family: Crambidae
- Genus: Tyspanodes
- Species: T. gracilis

Binomial name
- Tyspanodes gracilis Inoue, 1982

Species of moth

Tyspanodes gracilis is a moth in the family Crambidae. It was described by Hiroshi Inoue in 1982. It is found in Japan.
