= Tyspanodes exathesalis =

Scientific classification
- Kingdom: Animalia
- Phylum: Arthropoda
- Class: Insecta
- Order: Lepidoptera
- Family: Crambidae
- Genus: Tyspanodes
- Species: T. exathesalis

Binomial name
- Tyspanodes exathesalis (Walker, 1859)

Synonyms
- Euglyphis exathesalis Walker, 1859

Species of moth

Tyspanodes exathesalis is a moth in the family Crambidae. It was described by Francis Walker in 1859. It is found on Borneo.
