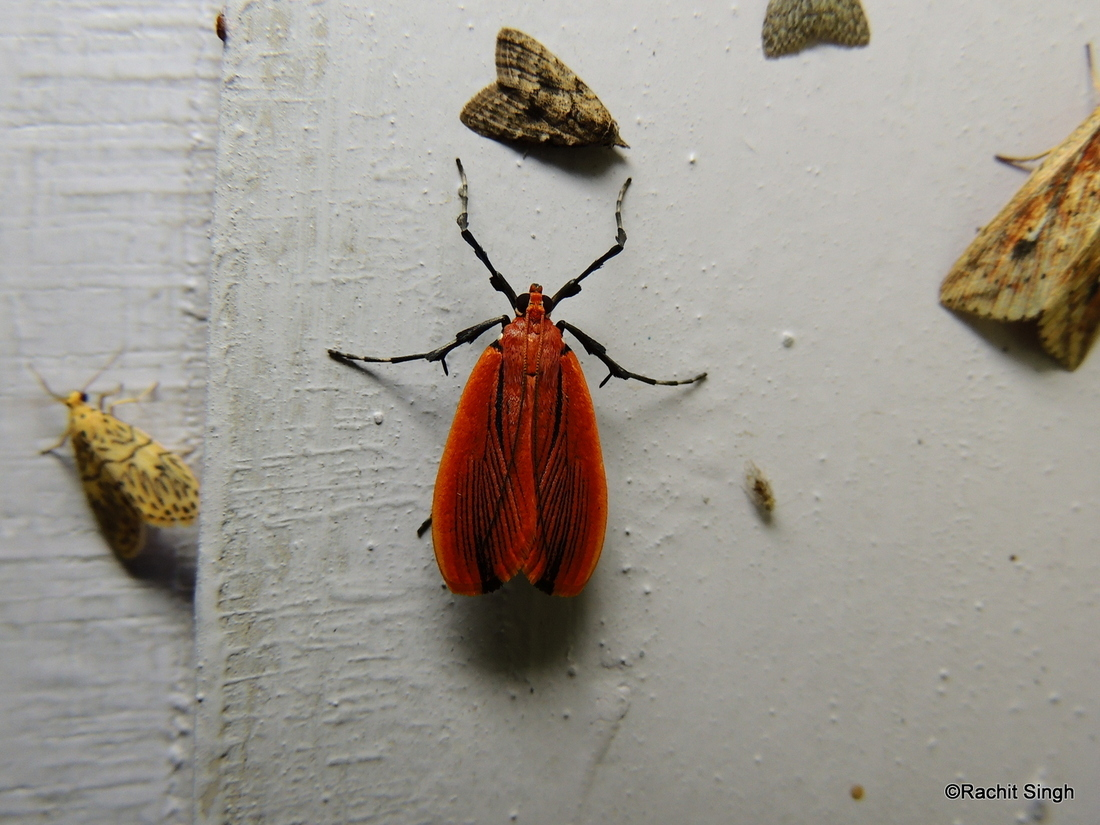

Scientific classification
- Kingdom: Animalia
- Phylum: Arthropoda
- Class: Insecta
- Order: Lepidoptera
- Family: Crambidae
- Genus: Tyspanodes
- Species: T. nigrolinealis

Binomial name
- Tyspanodes nigrolinealis Moore, 1867

Synonyms
- Filodes nigrolinealis Moore, 1867

= Tyspanodes nigrolinealis =

Species of moth

Tyspanodes nigrolinealis is a moth in the family Crambidae. It was described by Frederic Moore in 1867. It is found in Sikkim, India and Cambodia.

The wingspan is about 34 mm. The forewings are orange, with a black spot at the base and two in the end of the cell. There are black streaks in all the interspaces. The hindwings are black.
