= Tyspanodes cardinalis =

Scientific classification
- Kingdom: Animalia
- Phylum: Arthropoda
- Class: Insecta
- Order: Lepidoptera
- Family: Crambidae
- Genus: Tyspanodes
- Species: T. cardinalis

Binomial name
- Tyspanodes cardinalis Hampson, 1896

Species of moth

Tyspanodes cardinalis is a moth in the family Crambidae. It was described by George Hampson in 1896. It is found in India (Nagas).

The wingspan is about 42 mm. The forewings are crimson, with an orange costa and a black streak from the middle of the discocellulars widening to the outer margin. The hindwings are black.
