= Tyspanodes creaghi =

Scientific classification
- Kingdom: Animalia
- Phylum: Arthropoda
- Class: Insecta
- Order: Lepidoptera
- Family: Crambidae
- Genus: Tyspanodes
- Species: T. creaghi

Binomial name
- Tyspanodes creaghi Hampson, 1898

Synonyms
- Clupeosoma strigatalis Rothschild, 1915

Species of moth

Tyspanodes creaghi is a moth in the family Crambidae. It was described by George Hampson in 1898. It is found on Borneo and in Papua New Guinea and Australia, where it has been recorded from Queensland.

The wingspan is about 20 mm. Adults are ochreous yellow, the forewings with pale blue streaks below the base of the costa and the cell. There is some fuscous in and below the cell, as well as fuscous streaks at the base and on the medial part of the inner margin. The veins on the outer area are streaked with black and the interspaces above vein 2 are semihyaline, with short black streaks towards the termen. The hindwings are semihyaline yellow with a fuscous tinge.
