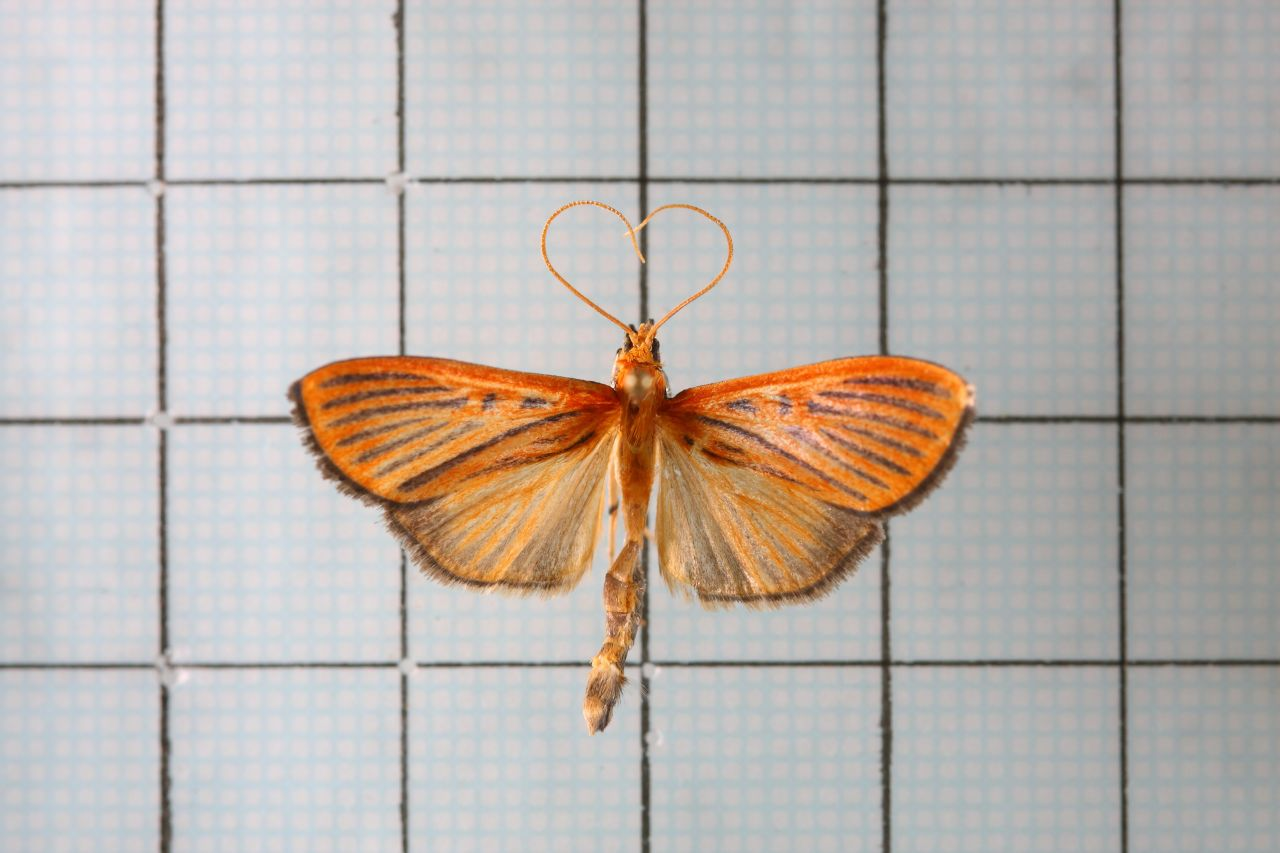

Scientific classification
- Kingdom: Animalia
- Phylum: Arthropoda
- Class: Insecta
- Order: Lepidoptera
- Family: Crambidae
- Tribe: Margaroniini
- Genus: Tyspanodes; Warren, 1891

= Tyspanodes =

Genus of moths

Tyspanodes is a genus of moths of the family Crambidae described by William Warren in 1891.

== Species ==
- Tyspanodes albidalis Hampson, 1912
- Tyspanodes cardinalis Hampson, 1896
- Tyspanodes celebensis Munroe, 1960
- Tyspanodes creaghi Hampson, 1898
- Tyspanodes exathesalis (Walker, 1859)
- Tyspanodes fascialis (Moore, 1867)
- Tyspanodes flaviventer Warren, 1891
- Tyspanodes flavolimbalis (Snellen, 1895)
- Tyspanodes gracilis Inoue, 1982
- Tyspanodes hemileucalis (Hampson, 1897)
- Tyspanodes hillalis (Schaus, 1927)
- Tyspanodes hypsalis Warren, 1891
- Tyspanodes linealis Moore, 1867
- Tyspanodes metachrysialis Lower, 1903
- Tyspanodes nigrolinealis Moore, 1867
- Tyspanodes obscuralis Caradja, 1925
- Tyspanodes piuralis Schaus, 1920
- Tyspanodes radiata (Kenrick, 1907)
- Tyspanodes striata (Butler, 1879)
- Tyspanodes suasalis Druce, 1899
