= Marine sailfin silverside =

Scientific classification
- Kingdom: Animalia
- Phylum: Chordata
- Class: Actinopterygii
- Order: Atheriniformes
- Suborder: Atherinoidei
- Family: Telmatherinidae
- Genus: Kalyptatherina; Saeed & Ivantsoff, 1991
- Species: K. helodes

Binomial name
- Kalyptatherina helodes (Ivantsoff & G. R. Allen, 1984)

Synonyms
- Pseudomugil helodes Ivantsoff & Allen, 1984

Species of fish

The marine sailfin silverside (Kalyptatherina helodes) is a species of sailfin silverside endemic to Indonesia, where it is only known from mangrove swamps around Misool and Batanta Islands. This species grows to 4.5 cm (1.8 in) total length. It is the only known member of its genus.
