= Paratherina =

Scientific classification
- Kingdom: Animalia
- Phylum: Chordata
- Class: Actinopterygii
- Order: Atheriniformes
- Family: Telmatherinidae
- Genus: Paratherina; Kottelat (ex Aurich), 1990

Type species
- Paratherina wolterecki Aurich, 1935

Genus of fishes

Paratherina is a genus of sailfin silversides in the family Melanotaeniidae which endemic to the Indonesian island of Sulawesi. There are four described species in this genus.

== Species ==
The currently recognized species in this genus are:

- Paratherina cyanea Aurich, 1935
- Paratherina labiosa Aurich, 1935
- Paratherina striata Aurich, 1935
- Paratherina wolterecki Aurich, 1935
