= Tyspanodes hillalis =

Scientific classification
- Kingdom: Animalia
- Phylum: Arthropoda
- Class: Insecta
- Order: Lepidoptera
- Family: Crambidae
- Genus: Tyspanodes
- Species: T. hillalis

Binomial name
- Tyspanodes hillalis (Schaus, 1927)

Synonyms
- Phostria hillalis Schaus, 1927

Species of moth

Tyspanodes hillalis is a moth in the family Crambidae. It was described by Schaus in 1927. It is found in the Philippines (Luzon).
