= Tyspanodes albidalis =

Scientific classification
- Kingdom: Animalia
- Phylum: Arthropoda
- Class: Insecta
- Order: Lepidoptera
- Family: Crambidae
- Genus: Tyspanodes
- Species: T. albidalis

Binomial name
- Tyspanodes albidalis Hampson, 1912

Species of moth

Tyspanodes albidalis is a moth in the family Crambidae. It was described by George Hampson in 1912. It is found on the Solomon Islands, where it has been recorded from Bougainville Island.

The wingspan is about 22 mm. The forewings are dirty white, the end of the cell and area just before the apex faintly tinged with yellow. There is a faint obliquely curved antemedial line, a slight discoidal lunule, and traces of a curved postmedial line. The hindwings are rather dirty white.
