= Tyspanodes metachrysialis =

Scientific classification
- Kingdom: Animalia
- Phylum: Arthropoda
- Class: Insecta
- Order: Lepidoptera
- Family: Crambidae
- Genus: Tyspanodes
- Species: T. metachrysialis

Binomial name
- Tyspanodes metachrysialis Lower, 1903

Synonyms
- Tyspanodes phaeosticha Turner, 1913

Species of moth

Tyspanodes metachrysialis is a moth in the family Crambidae. It was described by Oswald Bertram Lower in 1903. It is found in Australia, where it has been recorded from Queensland.
