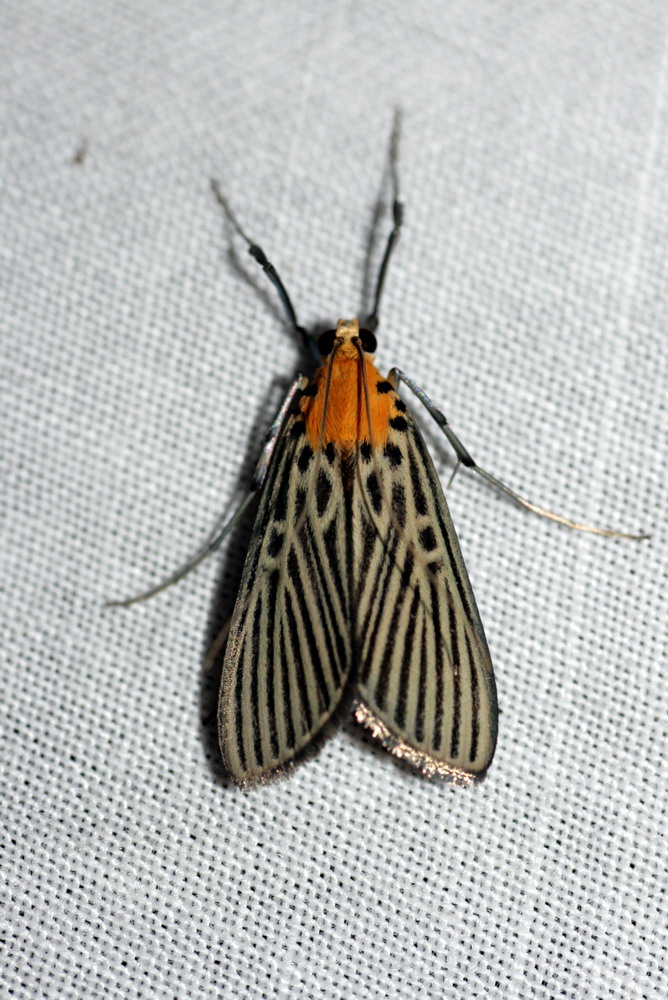
- Tyspanodes flavolimbalis

Scientific classification
- Kingdom: Animalia
- Phylum: Arthropoda
- Class: Insecta
- Order: Lepidoptera
- Family: Crambidae
- Genus: Tyspanodes
- Species: T. flavolimbalis

Binomial name
- Tyspanodes flavolimbalis (Snellen, 1895)

Synonyms
- Filodes flavolimbalis Snellen, 1895

= Tyspanodes flavolimbalis =

Species of moth

Tyspanodes flavolimbalis is a moth in the family Crambidae. It was described by Snellen in 1895. It is found in Indonesia (Sumatra, Java).
