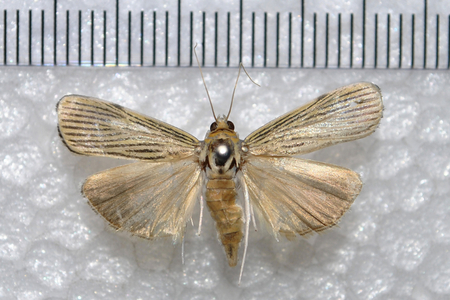

Scientific classification
- Kingdom: Animalia
- Phylum: Arthropoda
- Class: Insecta
- Order: Lepidoptera
- Family: Crambidae
- Genus: Tyspanodes
- Species: T. linealis

Binomial name
- Tyspanodes linealis (Moore, 1867)

Synonyms
- Propachys linealis Moore, [1868]

= Tyspanodes linealis =

Species of moth

Tyspanodes linealis is a moth in the family Crambidae. It was described by Frederic Moore in 1867. It is found in the Bhutan, the Himalayas, Sri Lanka, the Andamans, Thailand and Australia, where it has been recorded from Queensland.

The wingspan is about 28 mm. Adults are straw coloured, the forewings with the interspaces striped with fine black lines, as well as a fine marginal black line. The hindwings are suffused with fuscous.
