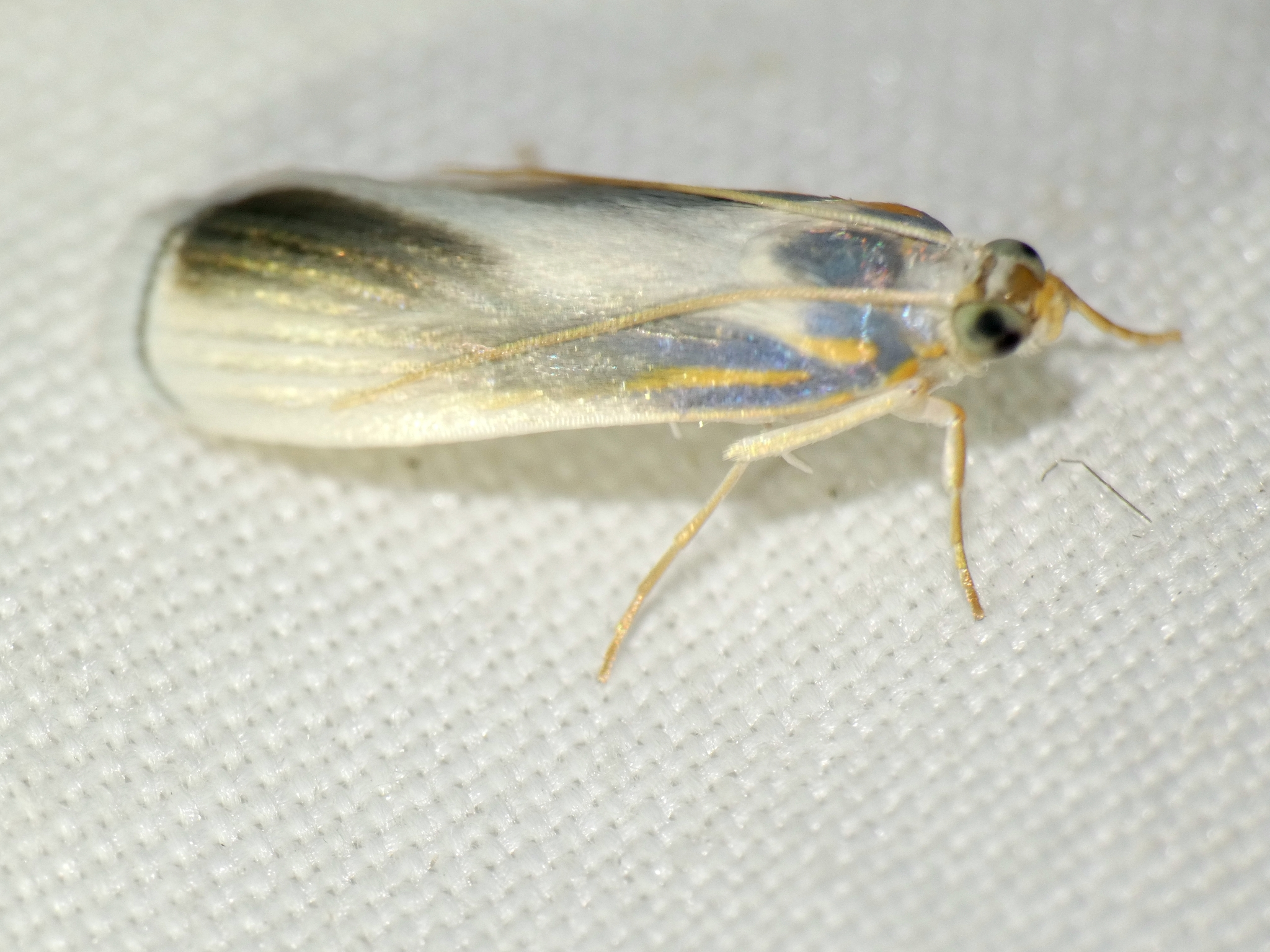

Scientific classification
- Kingdom: Animalia
- Phylum: Arthropoda
- Clade: Pancrustacea
- Class: Insecta
- Order: Lepidoptera
- Family: Crambidae
- Genus: Tyspanodes
- Species: T. hemileucalis

Binomial name
- Tyspanodes hemileucalis (Hampson, 1897)

Synonyms
- Diathraustodes hemileucalis Hampson, 1897

= Tyspanodes hemileucalis =

Species of moth

Tyspanodes hemileucalis is a species of moth in the family Crambidae. It was first described by George Hampson in 1897 and is found in Queensland, Australia.

== Description ==
The wingspan is about 18 mm. Adults are white, the forewings with basal streaks of metallic blue grey below the costa and in the cell. There are pale orange streaks on the costa and the subcostal nervure, as well as a wedge-shaped fuscous patch from the origin of vein 2 to the outer margin above the middle to near the outer angle. The hindwings are fuscous.
