= Tyspanodes obscuralis =

Scientific classification
- Kingdom: Animalia
- Phylum: Arthropoda
- Class: Insecta
- Order: Lepidoptera
- Family: Crambidae
- Genus: Tyspanodes
- Species: T. obscuralis

Binomial name
- Tyspanodes obscuralis Caradja, 1925

Species of moth

Tyspanodes obscuralis is a moth in the family Crambidae. It was described by Aristide Caradja in 1925. It is found in China.
