= Tyspanodes piuralis =

Scientific classification
- Kingdom: Animalia
- Phylum: Arthropoda
- Class: Insecta
- Order: Lepidoptera
- Family: Crambidae
- Genus: Tyspanodes
- Species: T. piuralis

Binomial name
- Tyspanodes piuralis Schaus, 1920

Species of moth

Tyspanodes piuralis is a moth in the family Crambidae. It was described by Schaus in 1920. It is found in Peru.

The wingspan is about 21 mm. The forewings are pale ochreous, thinly scaled, somewhat opalescent. There are small darker subbasal points on the median and vein 1 and a faint, fine, antemedial dark line outangled in the cell, deeply incurved below the cell, and outangled on vein 1. There are two dark points at the ends of the discocellular and the postmedial line is fine, dentate, well outcurved beyond the cell and preceded by a similar less distinct line. The termen is faintly tinged with brown and there are terminal dark points on the interspaces. The hindwings are hyaline opalescent white, with terminal black points on the interspaces.
