= Tyspanodes suasalis =

Scientific classification
- Kingdom: Animalia
- Phylum: Arthropoda
- Class: Insecta
- Order: Lepidoptera
- Family: Crambidae
- Genus: Tyspanodes
- Species: T. suasalis

Binomial name
- Tyspanodes suasalis H. Druce, 1899

Species of moth

Tyspanodes suasalis is a moth in the family Crambidae. It was described by Herbert Druce in 1899. It is found in Veracruz, Mexico.

The forewings and hindwings are semihyaline yellowish white, the former slightly darker near the apex.
