= Tyspanodes flaviventer =

Scientific classification
- Kingdom: Animalia
- Phylum: Arthropoda
- Class: Insecta
- Order: Lepidoptera
- Family: Crambidae
- Genus: Tyspanodes
- Species: T. flaviventer

Binomial name
- Tyspanodes flaviventer Warren, 1891

Species of moth

Tyspanodes flaviventer is a moth in the family Crambidae. It was described by Warren in 1891. It is found in India (West Bengal, Darjeeling).

The wingspan is about 32 mm. The forewings are grey, with a black spot at the base and two antemedial series of three black spots. There is a quadrate spot in the end of the cell and the interspaces are striped with black beyond the cell. The hindwings are orange, with black costal and apical areas.
