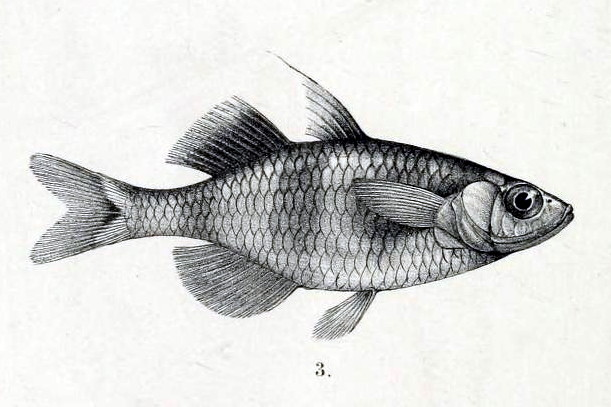

Conservation status
- Near Threatened (IUCN 3.1)

Scientific classification
- Kingdom: Animalia
- Phylum: Chordata
- Class: Actinopterygii
- Order: Atheriniformes
- Family: Telmatherinidae
- Genus: Telmatherina
- Species: T. celebensis

Binomial name
- Telmatherina celebensis Boulenger, 1897

= Telmatherina celebensis =

Species of fish

Telmatherina celebensis, also known as the Celebes rainbow, is a species of fish in the subfamily Telmatherininae part of the family Melanotaeniidae, the rainbowfishes. It is endemic to the island of Sulawesi in Indonesia where it has been found to occur in Lakes Towuti and Mahalona, and may also occur in Lake Wawontoa. This species was described in 1897 by George Albert Boulenger from a type locality of Lake Towuti.

== Etymology ==
The fish is named for Celebes which is now Sulawesi, Indonesia, where it is endemic.
