= Tominanga =

Scientific classification
- Kingdom: Animalia
- Phylum: Chordata
- Class: Actinopterygii
- Order: Atheriniformes
- Family: Telmatherinidae
- Genus: Tominanga; Kottelat, 1990

Type species
- Tominanga aurea Kottelat, 1990

Genus of fishes

Tominanga is a genus of sailfin silversides in the family Melanotaeniidae which endemic to the Indonesian island of Sulawesi.

== Species ==
There are currently two recognized species in this genus:

- Tominanga aurea Kottelat, 1990
- Tominanga sanguicauda Kottelat, 1990
