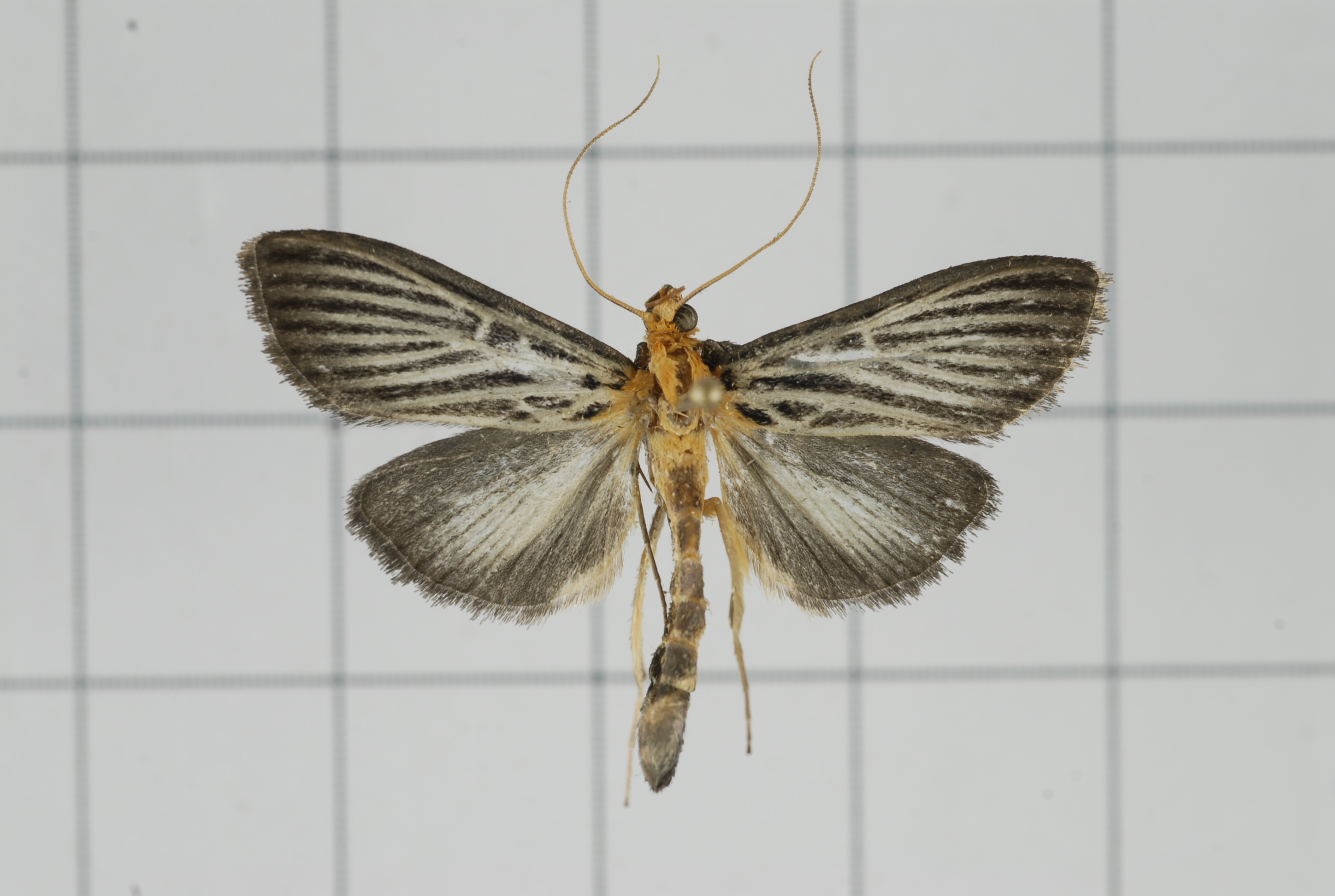

Scientific classification
- Kingdom: Animalia
- Phylum: Arthropoda
- Clade: Pancrustacea
- Class: Insecta
- Order: Lepidoptera
- Family: Crambidae
- Genus: Tyspanodes
- Species: T. hypsalis

Binomial name
- Tyspanodes hypsalis Warren, 1891

= Tyspanodes hypsalis =

Species of moth

Tyspanodes hypsalis is a moth in the family Crambidae. It was described by Warren in 1891. It is found in China, Korea and Taiwan.

The wingspan is 26–28 mm. The forewings are white, with the extreme base yellowish. The interspaces between the veins are marked with thick black lines. There are two subquadrate black spots in the cell and three more irregularly shaped towards the base. The hindwings are blackish, with the centre broadly whitish ochreous.
