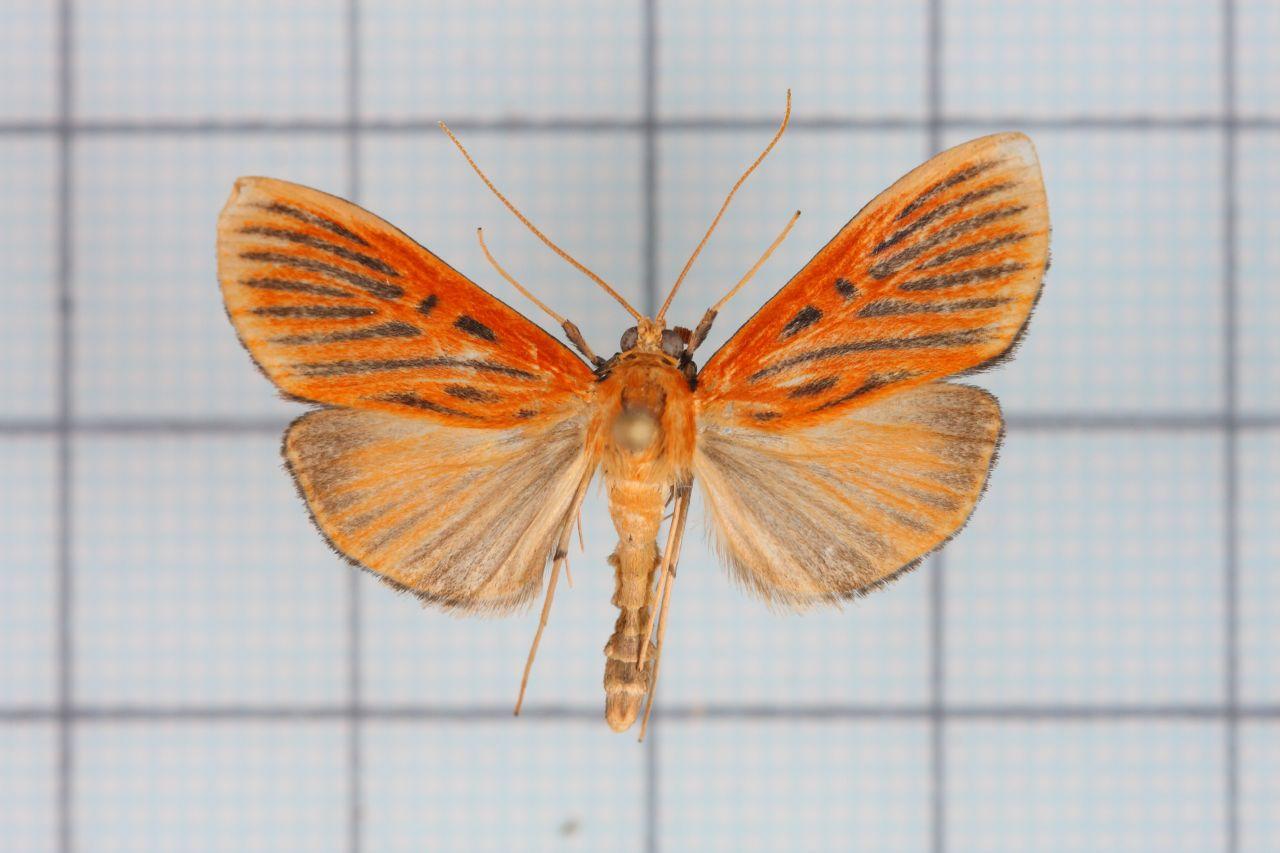

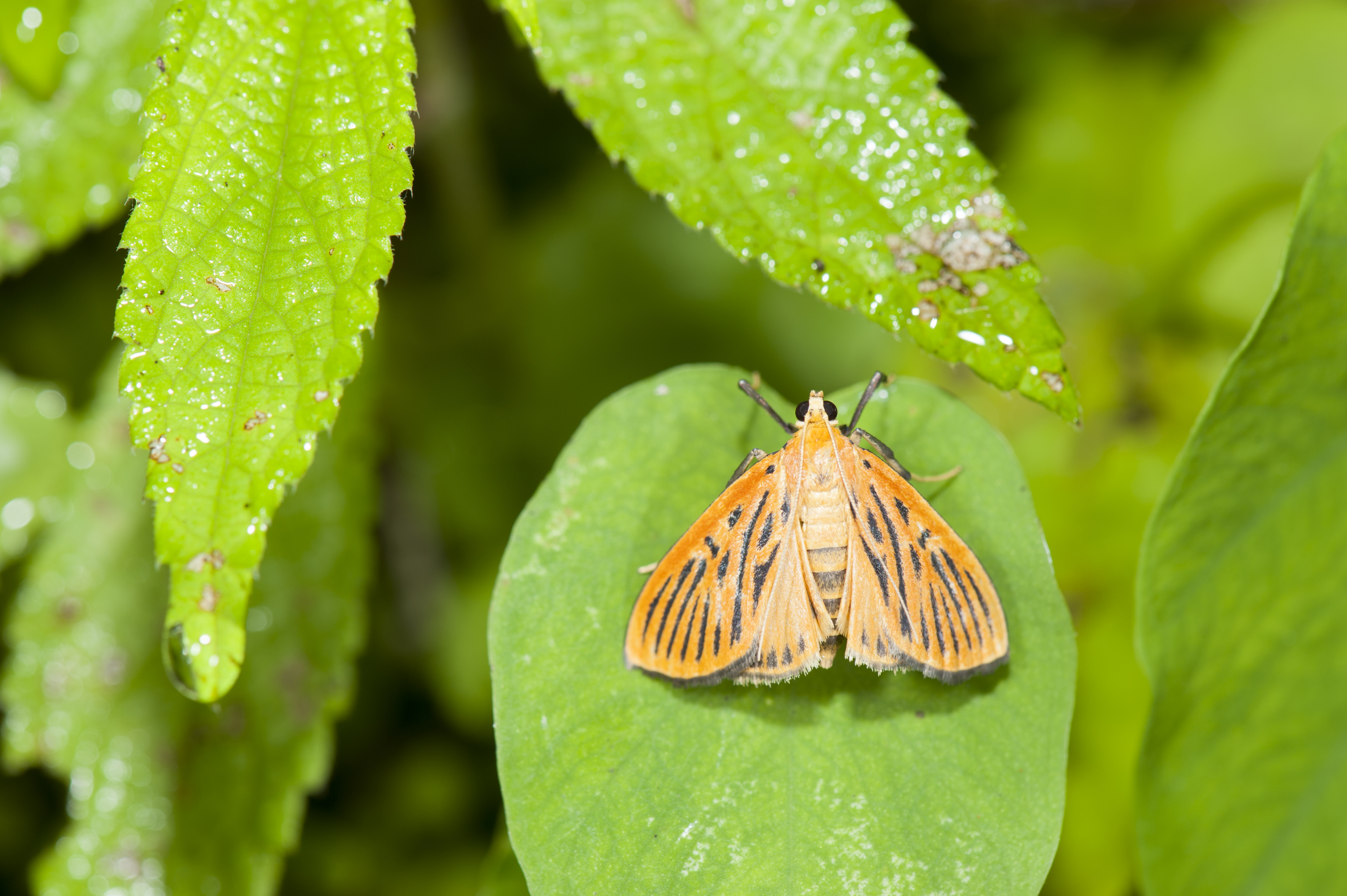

Scientific classification
- Kingdom: Animalia
- Phylum: Arthropoda
- Class: Insecta
- Order: Lepidoptera
- Family: Crambidae
- Genus: Tyspanodes
- Species: T. striata

Binomial name
- Tyspanodes striata (Butler, 1879)

Synonyms
- Astura striata Butler, 1879; Tyspanodes striatus

= Tyspanodes striata =

Species of moth

Tyspanodes striata is a species of moth of the family Crambidae described by Arthur Gardiner Butler in 1879. It is found in China, Taiwan and Japan.

The wingspan is 26–32 mm.
