= Tyspanodes celebensis =

Scientific classification
- Kingdom: Animalia
- Phylum: Arthropoda
- Class: Insecta
- Order: Lepidoptera
- Family: Crambidae
- Genus: Tyspanodes
- Species: T. celebensis

Binomial name
- Tyspanodes celebensis Munroe, 1960

Species of moth

Tyspanodes celebensis is a moth in the family Crambidae. It was described by Eugene G. Munroe in 1960. It is found in Indonesia (Sulawesi).
