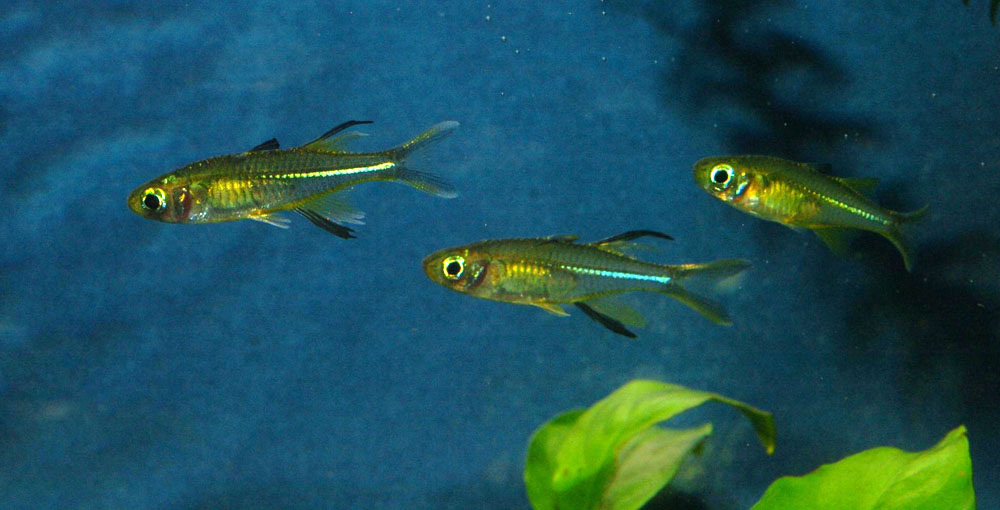

Conservation status
- Vulnerable (IUCN 2.3)

Scientific classification
- Kingdom: Animalia
- Phylum: Chordata
- Class: Actinopterygii
- Division: Teleostei
- Order: Atheriniformes
- Suborder: Atherinoidei
- Family: Telmatherinidae
- Genus: Marosatherina; Aarn, Ivantsoff & Kottelat, 1998
- Species: M. ladigesi

Binomial name
- Marosatherina ladigesi (C. G. E. Ahl, 1936)

Synonyms
- Telmatherina ladigesi C. G. E. Ahl, 1936

= Celebes rainbowfish =

Species of fish

The Celebes rainbowfish (Marosatherina ladigesi) is a species of sailfin silverside endemic to Sulawesi (formerly known as Celebes) in Indonesia. It is the only known member of its genus.

== Description ==
Males grow to 6–8 cm, and females to 5–7 cm in length. Their bodies are slender and almost fully transparent with a blue stripe along the sideline. The sexes can be easily distinguished, since males have elongated black dorsal and ventral fins, and are usually a little darker than females.

== Distribution and habitat ==
Marosatherina ladigesi is found only near the town of Maros from which the genus name Marosatherina is derived. Due to ornamental fish business and pollution, their numbers have been dramatically reduced.

These fish dwell in streams and estuaries, ranging from fresh to mildly brackish water. They are typically found in areas with high levels of dissolved oxygen. Most of their day is spent hiding among the leaves of plants, where they eat small worms, insects, or vegetable debris.

== In the aquarium ==
The Celebes rainbowfish is a peaceful aquarium fish. It grows to 7.5 cm (3 inches). It eats prepared foods and small livefoods. It prefers a temperature of 20–28 C (68–82 F), a pH of 7.0 to 7.5 and a hardness of 150 to 200 mg/L. These fish are sensitive to water quality.

If conditions are favorable spawning may occur nonstop for months, but they often eat their eggs. Eggs hatch after up to eleven days.

== Etymology ==
The name of the genus is a compound of Maros from the village near where the type was collected and Atherina, a genus of silverside while the specific name honours the German ichthyologist Werner Ladiges (1910–1984), who collected the type.
