= Lake Matano =

Lake in Sulawesi, Indonesia

Matano
- Danau Matano (Indonesian)
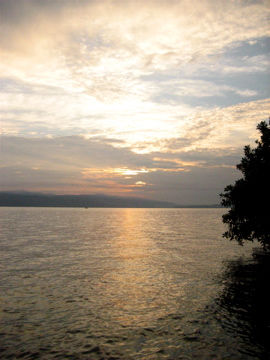
- Lake Matano at sunset

- Location within Indonesia Location within Sulawesi
- Location: South Sulawesi, Indonesia
- Coordinates: 2°29′7″S 121°20′0″E
- Type: Tectonic
- Primary outflows: Penten River
- Basin countries: Indonesia
- Max. length: 28 km (17 mi)
- Max. width: 8 km (5.0 mi)
- Surface area: 164.1 km^{2} (63.4 sq mi)
- Average depth: 240 m (790 ft)
- Max. depth: 590 m (1,940 ft)
- Water volume: 39.38 km^{3} (9.45 cu mi)
- Surface elevation: 382 m (1,253 ft)

Lake Matano (Indonesian: Danau Matano), also known as Matana, is a tropical lake in East Luwu Regency, South Sulawesi province, Indonesia, that is noteworthy for the unique environment in its deeper layers.

With a depth of 590 m (1,940 ft), it is the deepest lake in Indonesia (ranked by maximum depth), the 11th deepest lake in the world and the deepest lake on an island by maximum depth. The surface elevation from mean sea level is only 382 m (1,253 ft), which means that the deepest portion of the lake is below sea level (cryptodepression). It is one of the two major lakes (the other being Lake Towuti) in the Malili Lake system. Lake Matano is considered an ancient lake, and it formed in a tectonic graben around 1 to 2 million years ago.

Lake Matano and its catchment area have a large amount of endemic flora and fauna. The catchment area's soils and rocks make it have a relatively high amount of iron. Because the temperature on Sulawesi Island does not change much during the year, the epilimnion never gets cold enough to mix with the hypolimnion. The environment in the hypolimnion is noteworthy for its possible similarity to oceans in the Archean and Paleoproterozoic Eons, before the Great Oxidation Event (GOE). The biogeochemical activity in the hypolimnion has been studied as a model for these oceans.

== Environment ==
=== Catchment ===
The catchment of Lake Matano is around 436 square kilometers, or around 2.7 times the surface area of the lake. The catchment consists of soils with an iron oxide/hydroxide content that can exceed 20%, explaining the high iron content of Lake Matano. A noteworthy amount of carbonate rocks are present south of the lake. Every decade, around 2% of the catchment area of Lake Matano is deforested to generate new farmland. Farmland in the catchment could serve as a source of nutrients, possibly causing eutrophication. This could eventually disturb the unique environment of the lake and diminish endemic species. Lake Matano is already prone to receiving anthropogenic nitrogen from the atmosphere because of its geographic location.

=== Climate and water cycling ===
Lake Matano is located in a tropical climate zone, and experiences two seasons, a wet and a dry season, with an approximately constant temperature year-round. Because of the constant environmental temperature, the water in the epilimnion cannot cool sufficiently for exchange with the hypolimnion. The relatively high concentration of total dissolved solids in the deeper layers increases their density, further preventing mixing of the layers. The density of the epilimnion, which extends to around 100 m below the surface, has been observed to increase during the dry season (though not to a sufficient extent for mixing), and decrease during the wet season. Beneath the epilimnion, density is generally constant year-round. Because the hypolimnion does not receive water from the epilimnion, the physical and chemical environment in the hypolimnion differs greatly from the environment in the epilimnion.

== Flora and fauna ==
=== Flora ===
==== Fern ====
A wide variety of fern species are present in the basin of Lake Matano. These species come from several families, such as Adiantaceae, Davalliaceae, Dennstaedtiaceae, and Schizaeaceae. Some, such as Schizaeaceae, are usually only found below the Wallace Line in places such as New Guinea. Others, including Adiantaceae, are usually only found above the Wallace Line in places like Borneo. Some species, such as Lindsea pellaeiformis, are likely endemic to Sulawesi Island, where Lake Matano is located.

==== Diatoms ====
Roughly a fifth of taxa of diatoms in Lake Matano are endemic; the greatest number of diatom species in the Malali Lake System belongs to the genus Surirella. While water from Lake Matano does flow via rivers to Lake Mahalona and Lake Towuti, such flow does not appear to spread diatoms from Lake Matano to these lakes, as the proportion of taxa each of these two lakes that are also in Lake Matano (roughly half) is the same as it is for Lake Masapi, another lake on Sulawesi disconnected from Lake Matano. A few examples of taxa of diatom that are only in Lake Matano are Surirellla biseriata heteropolis, Surirella celebesiana matanensis, and Gomphonema matanensis, which serves as an example of gigantism of diatoms. Another endemic species is Cymbells distinguenda; it has been argued that this species may constitute a separate genus of diatoms.

=== Fauna ===
Lake Matano is home to many species of endemic fish and other animals (e.g. Caridina shrimps, Parathelphusid crabs and Tylomelania snails). The endemic fishes of Matano have been compared to the species swarms of the Rift Valley Lakes of Africa. While not as diverse, they are thought to have all arisen from a single ancestor species and diversified into numerous different species, which now fill many of the previously vacant ecological niches, as can be seen in the family Telmatherinidae. Endemic and near-endemic fishes from other families include Glossogobius matanensis, Mugilogobius adeia, Nomorhamphus weberi and Oryzias matanensis. Many of the endemics are seriously threatened due to pollution and predation/competition from a wide range of introduced fishes, including flowerhorn cichlids. The water snake Enhydris matannensis is only known from the vicinity of Lake Matano and on Muna Island.

== Microbial and biochemical activity ==
=== Banded iron formations ===
Molecular structure of bacteriochlorophyll e is shown. The bacterial family Chlorobiaceae, a type of green sulfur bacteria (GSB) utilize bacteriochlorophyll e for anoxygenic photosynthesis in the deeper anoxic zone.

The environment in Lake Matano in the hypolimnion is considered comparable to the environment in the ocean in the Archean Eon, as well as in the beginning of the Proterozoic Eon, before the Great Oxidation Event (GOE). This is because these oceans, like Lake Matano, probably lacked sulfate and oxygen, and likely had a relatively high amount of Fe(II). Banded iron formations (BIFs), which have both Fe(II) and Fe(III), were deposited in such environments. The method of formation of Fe(III) in such environments is unclear; one possibility is photoferrotrophy. As in the pre-GOE oceans, there was low phosphate availability, limiting the amount of life the epilimnion can support. Because of this, there is sufficient radiation from the Sun for photosynthesis by green sulfur bacteria with Bacteriochlorophyll e, even at depths greater than 100 m. In an environment like Lake Matano, the photoferrotrophy of such bacteria is described by this equation:

$\ce{{HCO3^-} + {4Fe^{II}} + {10H2O} ->[{light}][{}] {CH2O} + {4Fe(OH)3} + 7H+}$

The iron in the product would have an oxidation state of +3, potentially explaining the Fe(III) in BIFs. Most Fe(III) is thought to be covered with Fe(II) rather than exposed to organisms for use. However, a small amount of Fe(III), enough to consume a thirtieth of organic carbon, is reduced by microorganisms for respiration.

=== Methane cycling ===
Methane is virtually absent above roughly 105 m; its concentration then rises steadily until around 200 m before stabilizing at around 1.25 mmol/L. The amount of Carbon-14 in methane sampled from the lake suggests that the methane is only around 2 millennia old, and could not have been formed due to hydrothermal activity. The δ^{13}C-CH_{4} in Lake Matano is around -70 permil, suggesting that the carbon in the methane likely came from an organism. Methanogenesis in Lake Matano under 110 m is anaerobic, and likely occurs from acetate metabolism, or from carbon dioxide reduction with H_{2}. Any oxygen that would reach the anoxic zone would likely abiotically oxidize Fe(II), rather than methane. It is unclear how methane oxidation is able to occur at 122 m, as there is virtually no sulfate or nitrate. Coupling with catalyzed iron and manganese hydroxide reduction is one possibility.

δ^{13}C-CO_{2} is at around -8 permil below the epilimnion. The CO_{2} could be depleted to this extent because the carbon in this CO_{2} is coming from oxidation of the depleted CH_{4}, or because it has a hitherto unknown source. It is more depleted at 104 m and 122 m, possibly suggesting biotic methane oxidation. An area of less depleted δ^{13}C-CO_{2} at around 110 m may be due to CO_{2} metabolism by green sulfur bacteria.

In oxic environments, such as those present in most modern ecosystems, methanogens are outcompeted for organic carbon to metabolize such that, each year, over 99% of organic carbon is not metabolized to methane. Because most of these competing organisms are aerobic, it is likely that such competition did not exist in the anoxic environments that were present before the GOE, and that are present in places like the hypolimnion in Lake Matano, to the same extent. Because of this relative lack of competition, more organic carbon is metabolized to methane. The percent metabolized to methane is unclear; amounts from 5-10% to 80% have been suggested.

== See also ==
- List of lakes of Indonesia
- Ancient lake
- Green sulfur bacteria
- Banded iron formation
- Archean Eon
- Great Oxidation Event
- Anoxic waters
