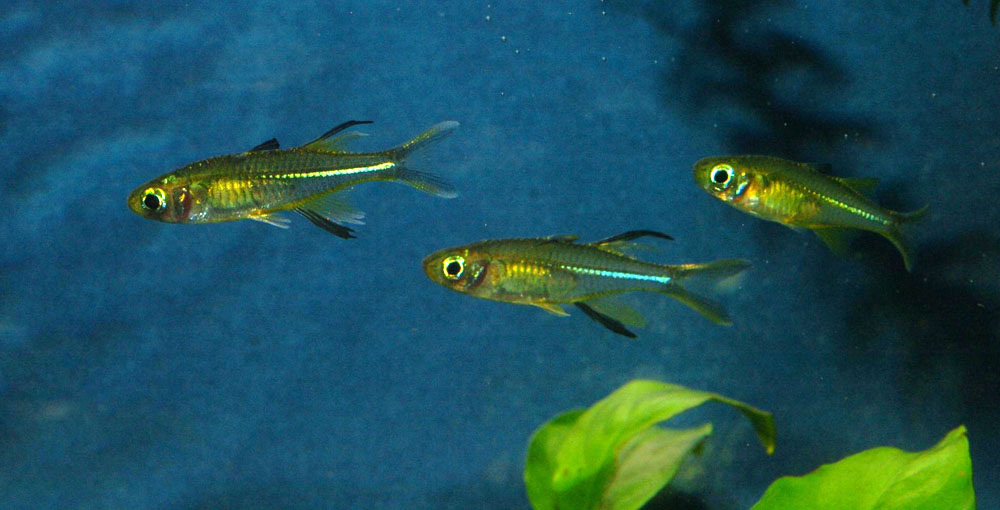
- Marosatherina ladigesi

Scientific classification
- Kingdom: Animalia
- Phylum: Chordata
- Class: Actinopterygii
- Order: Atheriniformes
- Suborder: Atherinoidei
- Family: Telmatherinidae; Munro, 1958

Genera
- Kalyptatherina; Marosatherina; Paratherina; Telmatherina; Tominanga

= Telmatherinidae =

Subfamily of fishes

The Telmatherinidae, the sail-fin silversides are a family of atheriniform fish, inhabiting fresh and brackish water. All but the species Kalyptatherina helodes are restricted to the Indonesian island of Sulawesi, and most are found solely in the Malili Lake system, consisting of Matano and Towuti, and the small Lontoa (Wawantoa), Mahalona and Masapi. They were formerly treated as a subfamily of the Melanotaeniidae.

They are small fish, typically ranging from 3 to 8 cm (1.2 to 3.1 in) in length, though the largest Paratherina can reach almost twice that size. They are named for the sail-like shape of their first dorsal fin in the males, which are also brightly coloured, compared with the females.
