= List of Corydoras species =

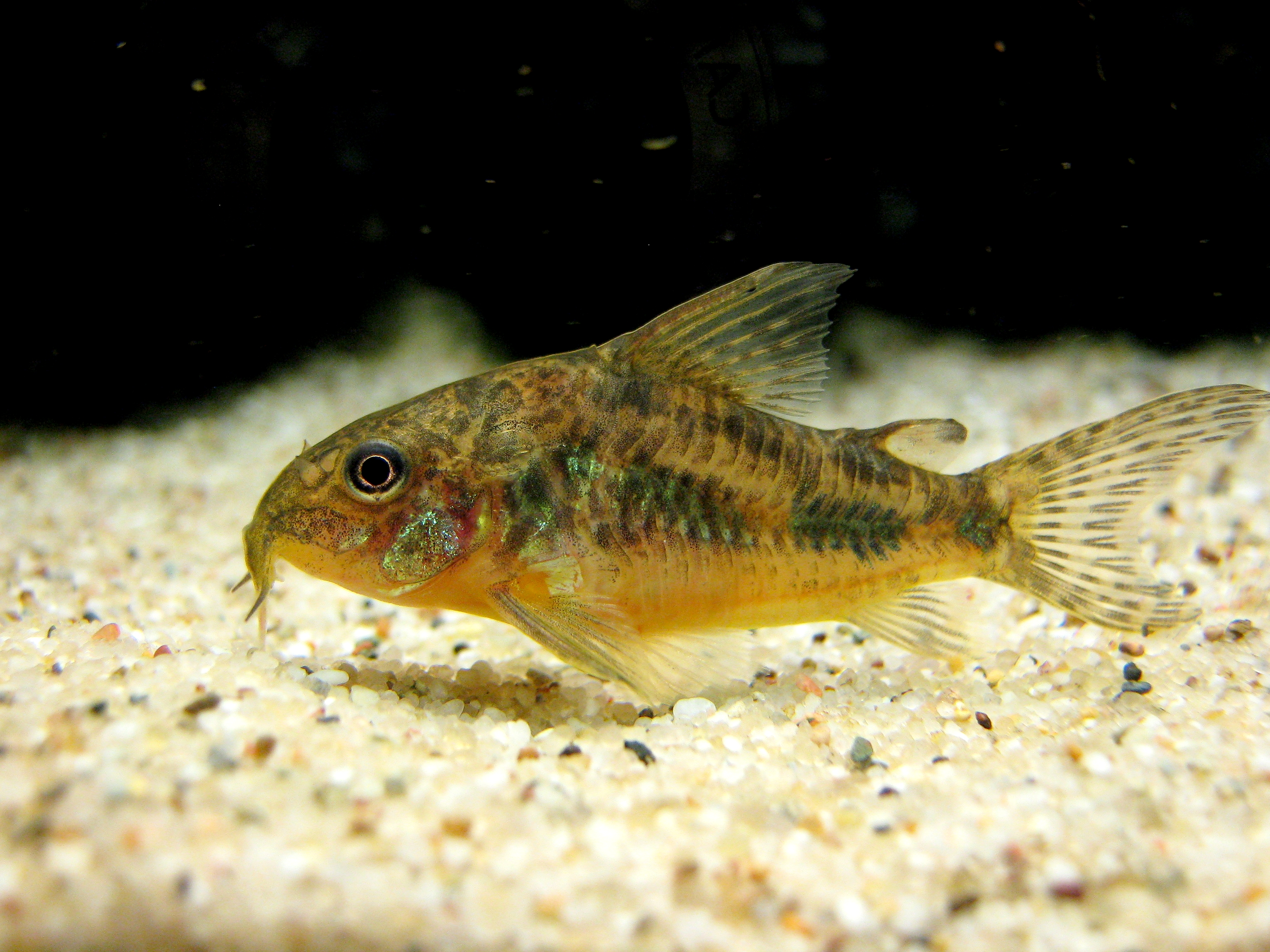
Cories are small catfish which are popular with aquarists - the Pepper cory is shown.

This is an alphabetically ordered list of Corydoras species. It includes those species subsequently re-allocated to other genera, such as Gastrodermus, Osteogaster, Brochis, and Hoplisoma. These genera were resurrected following a phylogenomic analysis in 2024.

Each entry includes: binomial scientific name, describer and year of publication.

Some entries are indicated with existing (common name) and synonyms.

== Species ==
There have been more than 200 species recognized in this genus:
Recent species

- Corydoras acrensis Nijssen, 1972 (Acre corydoras)
- Corydoras acutus Cope, 1872 (Blacktop corydoras)
- Corydoras adolfoi W. E. Burgess, 1982 (Adolfo's catfish)
- Corydoras aeneus (T. N. Gill, 1858) (Bronze corydoras) - Synonyms: Hoplosoma aeneum, C. microps, C. venezuelanus, C. macrosteus & C. schultzei
- Corydoras agassizii Steindachner, 1877 (Spotted corydoras)
- Corydoras albolineatus Knaack, 2004
- Corydoras amandajanea Sands, 1995
- Corydoras amapaensis Nijssen, 1972 (Amapa corydoras)
- Corydoras ambiacus Cope, 1872 (Spotted corydoras)
- Corydoras amphibelus Cope, 1872
- Corydoras apiaka Espindola, Spencer, L. R. Rocha & Britto, 2014
- Corydoras approuaguensis Nijssen & Isbrücker, 1983
- Corydoras araguaiaensis Sands, 1990
- Corydoras arcuatus Elwin, 1938 (Skunk corydoras)
- Corydoras areio Knaack, 2000
- Corydoras armatus (Günther, 1868)
- Corydoras atropersonatus S. H. Weitzman & Nijssen, 1970
- Corydoras aurofrenatus C. H. Eigenmann & C. H. Kennedy, 1903
- Corydoras australe Eigenmann & Ward in Eigenmann, McAtee & Ward, 1907 - Synonym: C. australis, C. hastatus
- Corydoras axelrodi Rössel, 1962 (Pink corydoras)
- Corydoras baderi Geisler, 1969 - Synonym: C. oelemariensis
- Corydoras bethanae (Bentley, Grant & Tencatt, 2021)
- Corydoras bertoni Eigenmann in Eigenmann & Allen, 1942
- Corydoras bicolor Nijssen & Isbrücker, 1967
- Corydoras bifasciatus Nijssen, 1972 (Twostripe corydoras)
- Corydoras bilineatus Knaack, 2002
- Corydoras blochi Nijssen, 1971 (Spotback corydoras)
- Corydoras boehlkei Nijssen & Isbrücker, 1982
- Corydoras boesemani Nijssen & Isbrücker, 1967
- Corydoras bondi Gosline, 1940 (Blackstripe corydoras)
- Corydoras breei Isbrücker & Nijssen, 1992
- Corydoras brevirostris Fraser-Brunner, 1947 - Synonym: C. melanistius brevirostris
- Corydoras britskii (Nijssen & Isbrücker, 1983) (Britski's Catfish)
- Corydoras brittoi Tencatt & Ohara, 2016
- Corydoras burgessi H. R. Axelrod, 1987
- Corydoras caramater Tencatt, Couto, Santos & Sousa, 2024
- Corydoras carlae Nijssen & Isbrücker, 1983
- Corydoras caudimaculatus Rössel, 1961 (Tailspot corydoras)
- Corydoras cervinus Rössel, 1962
- Corydoras cochui G. S. Myers & S. H. Weitzman, 1954 (Barredtail corydoras)
- Corydoras concolor S. H. Weitzman, 1961 (Concolor corydoras)
- Corydoras condiscipulus Nijssen & Isbrücker, 1980
- Corydoras copei Nijssen & Isbrücker, 1986
- Corydoras coppenamensis Nijssen, 1970 - Synonym: C. bondi coppenamensis
- Corydoras coriatae W. E. Burgess, 1997
- Corydoras cortesi Castro, 1987
- Corydoras costai Ottoni, Barbosa & Katz, 2016
- Corydoras crimmeni S. Grant, 1997
- Corydoras cruziensis Knaack, 2002
- Corydoras crypticus Sands, 1995
- Corydoras davidsandsi B. K. Black, 1987 (Sands's corydoras)
- Corydoras delphax Nijssen & Isbrücker, 1983 (False blochi catfish)
- Corydoras desana Lima & Sazima, 2017
- Corydoras deweyeri (Meinken, 1957)
- Corydoras difluviatilis Britto & R. M. C. Castro, 2002
- Corydoras diphyes Axenrot & S. O. Kullander, 2003
- Corydoras duplicareus Sands, 1995 (Duplicate corydoras)
- Corydoras ephippifera Nijssen, 1972 (Saddle corydoras)
- Corydoras ehrhardti Steindachner, 1910 - Synonym: C. meridionalis
- Corydoras eigenmanni R. von Ihering, 1907
- Corydoras elegans Steindachner, 1876 (Elegant corydoras) - Synonym: C. pestai
- Corydoras ellisae Gosline, 1940
- Corydoras ephippifer Nijssen, 1972 (Saddle corydoras)
- Corydoras eques Steindachner, 1876
- Corydoras esperanzae D. M. Castro, 1987
- Corydoras evelynae Rössel, 1963
- Corydoras eversi Tencatt & M. R. Britto, 2016 (Guarana cory)
- Corydoras filamentosus Nijssen & Isbrücker, 1983
- Corydoras flaveolus R. Ihering (pt), 1911
- Corydoras fowleri J. E. Böhlke, 1950
- Corydoras fulleri Tencatt, Evers, H-G & Britto 2021.
- Corydoras garbei R. Ihering (pt), 1911
- Corydoras geoffroy Lacépède, 1803 - Synonym: C. octocirrus
- Corydoras geryi Nijssen & Isbrücker, 1983 - Synonym: C. bolivianus
- Corydoras gladysae Calviño & Felipe Alonso, 2010
- Corydoras gomezi D. M. Castro, 1986
- Corydoras gossei Nijssen, 1972 (Palespotted corydoras)
- Corydoras gracilis Nijssen & Isbrücker, 1976
- Corydoras granti Tencatt, Lima & Britto, 2019
- Corydoras griseus Holly, 1940 (Grey corydoras)
- Corydoras gryphus Tencatt, Britto & Pavanelli, 2014
- Corydoras guapore Knaack, 1961 (Guapore corydoras)
- Corydoras guianensis Nijssen, 1970
- Corydoras habrosus S. H. Weitzman, 1960 (Salt and pepper catfish)
- Corydoras haraldschultzi Knaack, 1962 (Mosaic corydoras)
- Corydoras hastatus C. H. Eigenmann & R. S. Eigenmann, 1888 (Dwarf corydoras) - Synonym: C. australe
- Corydoras hephaestus Ohara, Tencatt & M. R. Britto, 2016 (Fireball cory)
- Corydoras heteromorphus Nijssen, 1970
- Corydoras iiap Tencatt, Ruiz-Tafur & Chuctaya, 2024
- Corydoras imitator Nijssen & Isbrücker, 1983 (Imitator corydoras)
- Corydoras incolicana W. E. Burgess, 1993
- Corydoras isbrueckeri Knaack, 2004
- Corydoras julii Steindachner, 1906 (Leopard corydoras)
- Corydoras kanei S. Grant, 1998
- Corydoras kronei de Miranda Ribeiro, 1907
- Corydoras lacerdai Hieronimus, 1995
- Corydoras lacrimostigmata Tencatt, Britto & Pavanelli, 2014
- Corydoras lamberti Nijssen & Isbrücker, 1986
- Corydoras latus N. E. Pearson, 1924
- Corydoras leopardus G. S. Myers, 1933 - Synonym: C. funnelli
- Corydoras leucomelas C. H. Eigenmann & W. R. Allen, 1942 (False spotted catfish) - Synonym: C. caquetae
- Corydoras longipinnis Knaack, 2007
- Corydoras loretoensis Nijssen & Isbrücker, 1986
- Corydoras loxozonus Nijssen & Isbrücker, 1983
- Corydoras lymnades Tencatt, Vera Alcaraz, Britto & Pavanelli, 2013
- Corydoras maclurei (Tencatt, Gomes & Evers, 2023)
- Corydoras macropterus Regan, 1913
- Corydoras maculifer Nijssen & Isbrücker, 1971 (Dotted corydoras)
- Corydoras mamore Knaack, 2002
- Corydoras melanistius Regan, 1912 (Bluespotted corydoras) - Synonym: C. wotroi
- Corydoras melanotaenia Regan, 1912 (Green gold catfish)
- Corydoras melini Lönnberg & Rendahl (de), 1930 (Bandit corydoras)
- Corydoras metae C. H. Eigenmann, 1914 (Masked corydoras)
- Corydoras micracanthus Regan, 1912
- Corydoras microcephalus Regan, 1912
- Corydoras multimaculatus Steindachner, 1907
- Corydoras multiradiatus (Orcés-V. (es), 1960) (Hognosed brochis)
- Corydoras nanus Nijssen & Isbrücker, 1967 (Little corydoras)
- Corydoras napoensis Nijssen & Isbrücker, 1986
- Corydoras narcissus Nijssen & Isbrücker, 1980
- Corydoras nattereri Steindachner, 1877 (Blue corydoras) - Synonyms: C. juquiaae & C. nattereri triseriatus
- Corydoras negro Knaack, 2004
- Corydoras nijsseni Sands, 1989 (Nijssen's corydoras) - Synonym: C. elegans nijsseni
- Corydoras noelkempffi Knaack, 2004
- Corydoras oharai Tencatt, Carvalho, Silva & Britto, 2025
- Corydoras oiapoquensis Nijssen, 1972
- Corydoras ornatus Nijssen & Isbrücker, 1976
- Corydoras orphnopterus S. H. Weitzman & Nijssen, 1970
- Corydoras ortegai Britto, F. C. T. Lima & Hidalgo, 2007
- Corydoras osteocarus J. E. Böhlke, 1951
- Corydoras ourastigma Nijssen, 1972
- Corydoras oxyrhynchus Nijssen & Isbrücker, 1967
- Corydoras paleatus (Jenyns, 1842) (Peppered corydoras) - Synonyms: C. maculatus, C. marmoratus, Silurus quadricostatus & Silurus 7-radiatus
- Corydoras panda Nijssen & Isbrücker, 1971 (Panda corydoras)
- Corydoras pantanalensis Knaack, 2001
- Corydoras paragua Knaack, 2004
- Corydoras parallelus W. E. Burgess, 1993
- Corydoras pastazensis S. H. Weitzman, 1963 (Pastaza corydoras) - Synonym: C. pastazensis orcesi
- Corydoras paucerna Knaack, 2004
- Corydoras pauciradiatus Weitzman & Nijssen, 1970 (Sixray corydoras) - Synonym: Aspidoras pauciradiatus
- Corydoras petracinii Calviño & Felipe Alonso, 2010
- Corydoras pinheiroi Dinkelmeyer, 1995
- Corydoras polystictus Regan, 1912 - Synonym: C. virescens
- Corydoras potaroensis G. S. Myers, 1927
- Corydoras prionotos Isbrücker & Nijssen, 1980
- Corydoras pulcher Isbrücker & Nijssen, 1973 (Pretty corydoras)
- Corydoras punctatus (Bloch, 1794) (Spotfin corydoras)
- Corydoras pygmaeus Knaack, 1966 (Pygmy corydoras)
- Corydoras rabauti La Monte, 1941 (Rusty corydoras) - Synonym: C. myersi
- Corydoras reticulatus Fraser-Brunner, 1938 (Reticulated corydoras)
- Corydoras reynoldsi G. S. Myers & S. H. Weitzman, 1960
- Corydoras robineae W. E. Burgess, 1983 (Bannertail corydoras)
- Corydoras robustus Nijssen & Isbrücker, 1980
- Corydoras sanchesi Nijssen & Isbrücker, 1967
- Corydoras saramaccensis Nijssen, 1970
- Corydoras sarareensis Dinkelmeyer, 1995
- Corydoras schwartzi Rössel, 1963 (Schwartz's catfish)
- Corydoras semiaquilus S. H. Weitzman, 1964
- Corydoras septentrionalis Gosline, 1940 - Synonym: C. cortesi
- Corydoras serratus Sands, 1995
- Corydoras seussi Dinkelmeyer, 1996
- Corydoras similis Hieronimus, 1991
- Corydoras simulatus S. H. Weitzman & Nijssen, 1970
- Corydoras sipaliwini Hoedeman, 1965
- Corydoras sodalis Nijssen & Isbrücker, 1986 (False network catfish)
- Corydoras solox Nijssen & Isbrücker, 1983
- Corydoras spectabilis Knaack, 1999
- Corydoras spilurus Norman, 1926 (Pinkthroat corydoras)
- Corydoras splendens (Castelnau, 1855) (Emerald corydoras)
- Corydoras steindachneri Isbrücker & Nijssen, 1973 (Paraná corydoras)
- Corydoras stenocephalus C. H. Eigenmann & W. R. Allen, 1942
- Corydoras sterbai Knaack, 1962 (Sterba's corydoras)
- Corydoras surinamensis Nijssen, 1970
- Corydoras sychri S. H. Weitzman, 1960 (Sychr's catfish)
- Corydoras treitlii Steindachner, 1906 (Longsnout corydoras)
- Corydoras trilineatus Cope, 1872 (Threestripe corydoras) - Synonyms: C. episcopi, C. dubius
- Corydoras tukano Britto & F. C. T. Lima, 2003
- Corydoras undulatus Regan, 1912
- Corydoras urucu Britto, Wosiacki & Montag, 2009
- Corydoras virginiae W. E. Burgess, 1993 (Miguelito corydoras)
- Corydoras vittatus Nijssen, 1971 - Synonym: C. blochi vittatus
- Corydoras weitzmani Nijssen, 1971 (Twosaddle corydoras)
- Corydoras xinguensis Nijssen, 1972 (Xingu corydoras)
- Corydoras zawadzkii Tencatt & Ohara, 2016
- Corydoras zygatus C. H. Eigenmann & W. R. Allen, 1942 (Black band catfish)

Fossil species

- †Corydoras revelatus Cockerell, 1925—fossil species from the Late Paleocene
