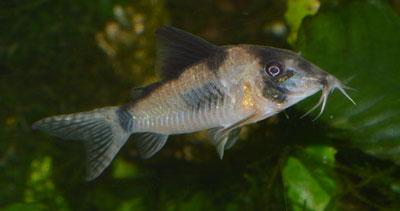

Conservation status
- Vulnerable (IUCN 3.1)

Scientific classification
- Kingdom: Animalia
- Phylum: Chordata
- Class: Actinopterygii
- Order: Siluriformes
- Family: Callichthyidae
- Genus: Corydoras
- Species: C. simulatus

Binomial name
- Corydoras simulatus S. H. Weitzman & Nijssen, 1970

= Corydoras simulatus =

Species of fish

Corydoras simulatus, the Olga cory, is a species of freshwater ray-finned fish belonging to the subfamily Corydoradinae, the corys, of the family Callichthyidae, the armoured catfishes. This species is found in the Upper Meta River basin in Colombia.

The fish prefers clean, clear water with a current. It will grow in length up to 1.9 inches (4.8 centimeters). It lives in a tropical climate in water with a 6.0 – 8.0 pH, a water hardness of 2 – 25 dGH, and a temperature range of 68–77 °F (20–25 °C). It feeds on worms, benthic crustaceans, insects, and plant matter. It lays eggs in dense vegetation, and adults do not guard the eggs.

== See also ==
- List of freshwater aquarium fish species
