= C105 =

C105 may refer to:

- Xingu corydoras, a species of South American Corydoras armoured catfish
- A subtype of Enterovirus C
