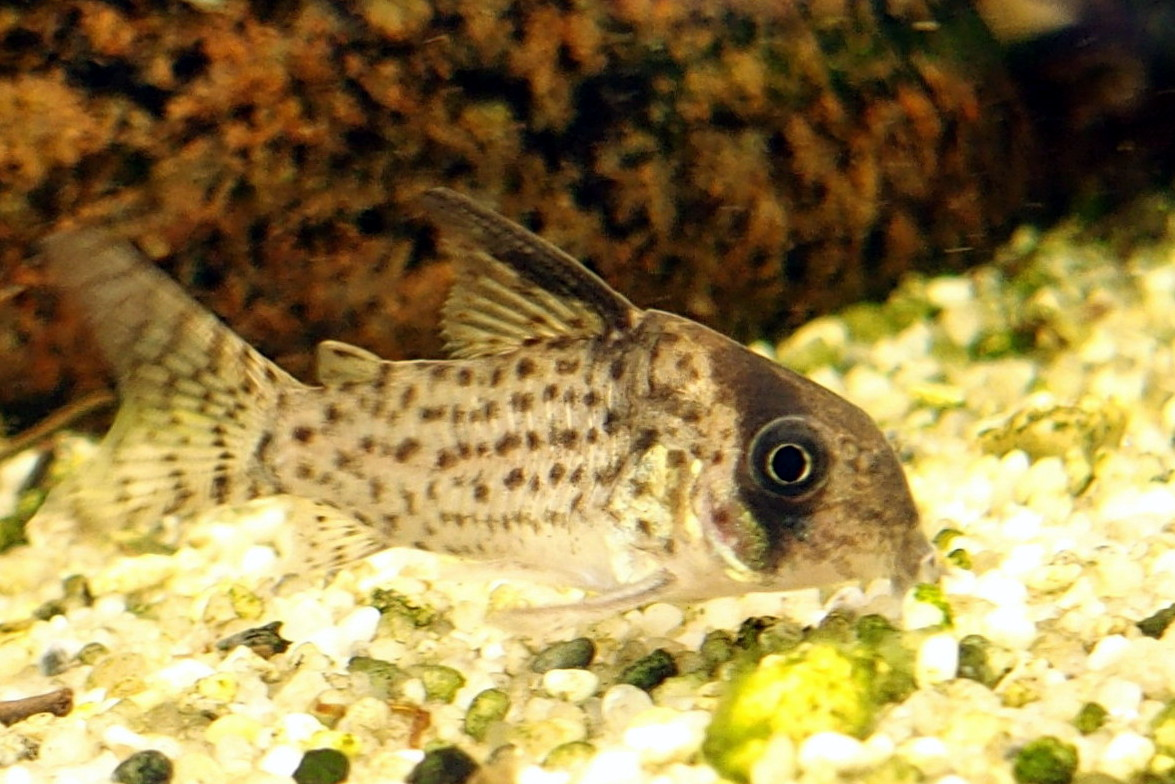

Conservation status
- Least Concern (IUCN 3.1)

Scientific classification
- Kingdom: Animalia
- Phylum: Chordata
- Class: Actinopterygii
- Order: Siluriformes
- Family: Callichthyidae
- Genus: Hoplisoma
- Species: H. kanei

Binomial name
- Hoplisoma kanei (S. Grant, 1998)

Synonyms
- Corydoras kanei Grant, 1998

= Hoplisoma kanei =

Species of fish

Hoplisoma kanei, Kane's cory, is a species of freshwater ray-finned fish belonging to the subfamily Corydoradinae, the corys, of the family Callichthyidae, the armoured catfishes. This catfish is endemic to Brazil where it is found in the Negros River basin. It is externally similar to H. atropersonatum, but its spots are denser and unlike the former, it has caudal markings - markings on its tail fins. Breeding can be accomplished by feeding a mixture of live foods and catfish pellets, after which frequent cold water changes can trigger them to spawn. A gravid female will lay around 60 eggs; heavy oxygenation of the water is likely to be more efficacious at saving fry than using methylene blue. Fry grow slowly and reach around 2 cm after 8 months. It is not recommended to add different fish into the fry rearing tank. They do not mind lower temperatures and can be kept with species of fish that are endemic to low-temperature habitats, such as Sewellia lineolata.
