= Hoplisoma osteocarum =

Conservation status
- Least Concern (IUCN 3.1)

Scientific classification
- Kingdom: Animalia
- Phylum: Chordata
- Class: Actinopterygii
- Division: Teleostei
- Order: Siluriformes
- Family: Callichthyidae
- Genus: Hoplisoma
- Species: H. osteocarum

Binomial name
- Hoplisoma osteocarum (J. E. Böhlke, 1951)

Synonyms
- Corydoras osteocarus J. E. Böhlke, 1951

Species of fish

Hoplisoma osteocarum, the bonehead cory or pepper cory, is a species of freshwater ray-finned fish belonging to the subfamily Corydoradinae, the corys, of the family Callichthyidae, the armoured catfishes. This catfish is found in the Orinoco River basin in Colombia and Venezuela. In the system of "C-Numbers" developed by the German fishkeeping magazine DATZ to identify undescribed species of Corydoras in the aquarium hobby, this fish had been assigned number "C60" until it was correctly identified.

The fish will grow in length up to 1.6 inches (4.1 centimeters). It lives in a tropical climate in water with a 6.0 – 8.0 pH, a water hardness of 2 – 25 dGH, and a temperature range of 70–77 °F (21–25 °C). It feeds on worms, benthic crustaceans, insects, and plant matter. It lays eggs in dense vegetation, and adults do not guard the eggs. In captivity, it produces up to 300 eggs, which it usually attaches to plants. Hatching occurs in about 3–4 days at 21.4 °C (70.5 °F).

== See also ==
- List of freshwater aquarium fish species
