= Corydoras negro =

Conservation status
- Data Deficient (IUCN 3.1)

Scientific classification
- Kingdom: Animalia
- Phylum: Chordata
- Class: Actinopterygii
- Order: Siluriformes
- Family: Callichthyidae
- Genus: Corydoras
- Species: C. negro

Binomial name
- Corydoras negro Knaack, 2004

Species of fish

Corydoras negro is a species of freshwater ray-finned fish belonging to the subfamily Corydoradinae, the corys, of the family Callichthyidae, the armoured catfishes. This catfish is found in Bolivia in the Iténez and Amazon river basins.
