= Hoplisoma albolineatum =

Conservation status
- Least Concern (IUCN 3.1)

Scientific classification
- Kingdom: Animalia
- Phylum: Chordata
- Class: Actinopterygii
- Order: Siluriformes
- Family: Callichthyidae
- Genus: Hoplisoma
- Species: H. albolineatum

Binomial name
- Hoplisoma albolineatum (Knaack, 2004)

Synonyms
- Corydoras albolineatus Knaack, 2004

Species of fish

Hoplisoma albolineatum, the white stripe cory, is a species of freshwater ray-finned fish belonging to the subfamily Corydoradinae, the corys, of the family Callichthyidae, the armoured catfishes. This species is found in the Itenez River in Bolivia and in the states of Rondônia and Mato Grosso in Brazil, although this river is called the Guaporé River there. This species reaches a maximum standard length of 3.7 cm (1.5 in).
