= Tailspot corydoras =

Conservation status
- Least Concern (IUCN 3.1)

Scientific classification
- Kingdom: Animalia
- Phylum: Chordata
- Class: Actinopterygii
- Order: Siluriformes
- Family: Callichthyidae
- Genus: Hoplisoma
- Species: H. caudimaculatum

Binomial name
- Hoplisoma caudimaculatum (Rössel, 1961)

Synonyms
- Corydoras caudimaculatus Rössel, 1961

Species of fish

The tailspot corydoras (Hoplisoma caudimaculatum) is a species of freshwater ray-finned fish belonging to the subfamily Corydoradinae, the corys, of the family Callichthyidae, the armoured catfishes. This species is found in the Guaporé River basin in Bolivia and Brazil.

The tailspot corydoras attains a maximum standard length of 4.2 cm (1.7 in). It lives in a tropical climate in water with a 6.0 – 8.0 pH, a water hardness of 2 – 25 dGH, and a temperature range of 22–26 °C (72–79 °F). Corys are ominivorous and will eat both plant and animal matter. It lays eggs in dense vegetation and adults do not guard the eggs. The female carries the eggs in a pouch formed by the pelvic fins.

The tailspot corydoras is of commercial importance in the aquarium trade industry.

== See also ==
- List of freshwater aquarium fish species
