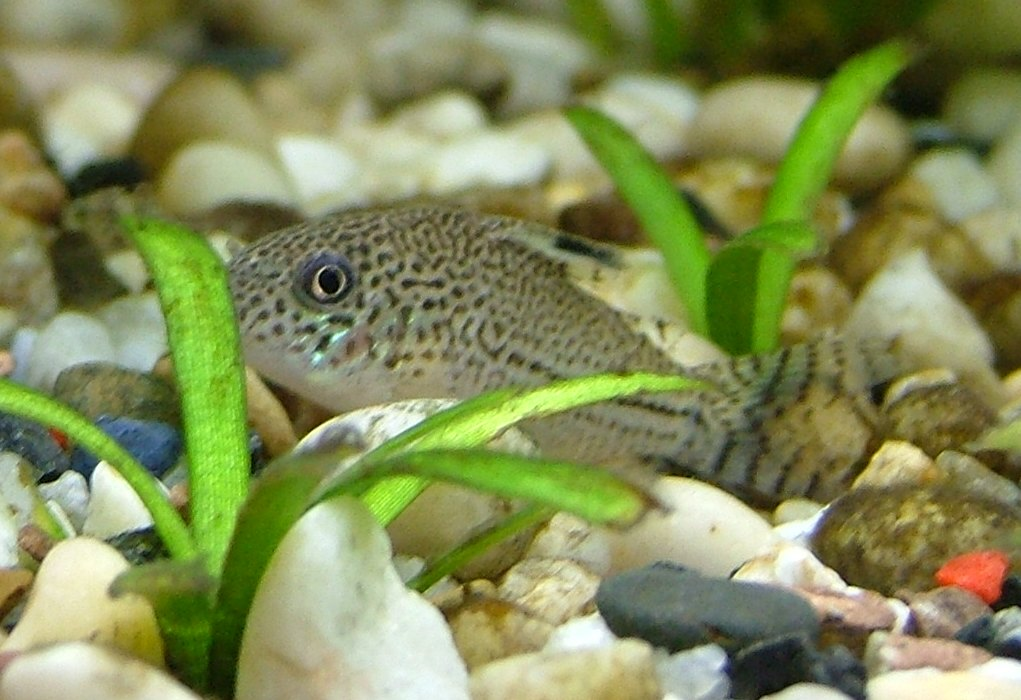

Conservation status
- Least Concern (IUCN 3.1)

Scientific classification
- Kingdom: Animalia
- Phylum: Chordata
- Class: Actinopterygii
- Order: Siluriformes
- Family: Callichthyidae
- Genus: Hoplisoma
- Species: H. julii

Binomial name
- Hoplisoma julii (Steindachner, 1906)

Synonyms
- Corydoras julii Steindachner, 1906

= Hoplisoma julii =

Species of fish

Hoplisoma julii, the julii cory or leopard catfish, is a species of freshwater ray-finned fish belonging to the subfamily Corydoradinae, the corys, of the family Callichthyidae, the armoured catfishes. This catfish is found in the Parnaíba River basin, in the states of Ceará, Piauí and Maranhão, as well as in the coastal basins of Maranhão and the lower Amazon River. This species may be endemic to the Maranhão-Piauí ecoregion. However, there are records of the species in streams of northeastern Pará, in the Maracanã and Marapanim River basins. Other records of this species are from the Marañón, Tigre, Huallaga and Ucayali rivers and their tributaries in Peru, as well as in the Leticia region, in the Amazon River basin of Colombia.

Hoplisoma julii is often confused with Hoplisoma trilineatum, the three stripe corydoras. Hoplisoma julii are small, peaceful shoaling fish, and are typically kept in groups in captivity.

== Physical appearance ==
Hoplisoma julii is a relatively small species of fish, growing to be no more than 5.2 centimetres (2.0 in) in length. Its skin is a translucent whitish-gray, with fine black spotting across the body and a horizontal stripe which reaches up the mid-body until it is equal with the front base of the dorsal fin. This spotting pattern is the primary visual difference between H. julii and threestripe corydoras (H. trilineatum), which have larger reticulations, as opposed to spots, and a longer mid-body stripe. H. julii might be further distinguished from H. trilineatum by the spotted pattern on its head; however, H. trilineatum can also show this pattern on occasion. Females are typically larger and rounder than males.

== Behavior ==
=== Diet ===
Hoplisoma julii, like almost all Hoplisoma species, are bottom-feeding scavengers. Their diet consists primarily of small invertebrates which they sift from the substrate, expelling the particles of sand and sediment through their gill openings.

In captivity, their diet is frequently sinking pellets rich in insect and other invertebrate proteins, as well as live or frozen invertebrates like bloodworms, daphnia, brine shrimp, and California blackworms (Lumbriculus variegatus).

=== Breeding ===
After sexual maturity, Hoplisoma spawning appears to be triggered by storms. During this storm, the fish eat increased amounts of insects. The water gradually decreases temperature over the course of a few days.

Hoplisoma, and related fishes, breed in a position resembling a "T formation". In this formation, the female swims up to the male's abdomen, and consumes sperm released by the male. The sperm rapidly travels though the female's intestinal tract and fertilizes the eggs in the cloaca. Small, white, sturdy eggs are laid on plant leaves in the wild. Adults have been known to eat their own eggs.
