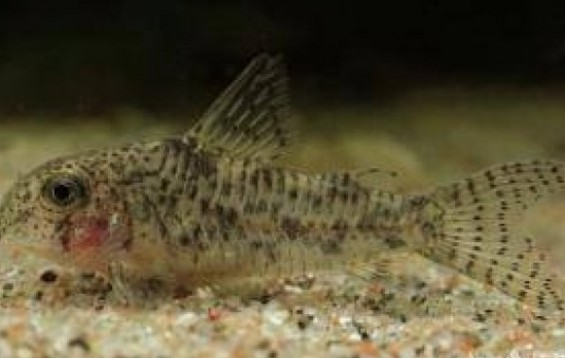

Conservation status
- Least Concern (IUCN 3.1)

Scientific classification
- Kingdom: Animalia
- Phylum: Chordata
- Class: Actinopterygii
- Order: Siluriformes
- Family: Callichthyidae
- Genus: Hoplisoma
- Species: H. cochui

Binomial name
- Hoplisoma cochui (Myers & Weitzman, 1954)

Synonyms
- Corydoras cochui Myers & Weitzman, 1954

= Barredtail corydoras =

Species of fish

The barredtail corydoras (Hoplisoma cochui), or Cochu's catfish, is a species of freshwater ray-finned fish belonging to the subfamily Corydoradinae, the corys, of the family Callichthyidae, the armored catfishes. This species is found in the Upper Araguaia River basin and in the Xingu River in Brazil. In the system of "C-Numbers" developed by the German fishkeeping magazine DATZ to identify undescribed species of Corydoras in the aquarium hobby, this fish had been assigned number "C22" until it was correctly identified.

The barredtail corydoras has a specific name that honors the tropical fish importer Ferdinand "Fred" Cochu of the Paramount Aquarium, who collected the type species.

== See also ==
- List of freshwater aquarium fish species
