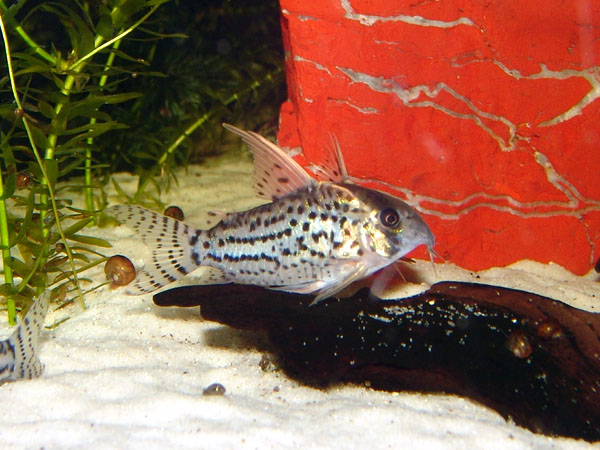

Conservation status
- Least Concern (IUCN 3.1)

Scientific classification
- Kingdom: Animalia
- Phylum: Chordata
- Class: Actinopterygii
- Order: Siluriformes
- Family: Callichthyidae
- Genus: Hoplisoma
- Species: H. schwartzi

Binomial name
- Hoplisoma schwartzi (Rössel, 1963)

Synonyms
- Corydoras schwartzi Rössel, 1963

= Schwartz's catfish =

Species of fish

Schwartz's catfish (Hoplisoma schwartzi) is a species of freshwater ray-finned fish belonging to the subfamily Corydoradinae, the corys, of the family Callichthyidae, the armoured catfishes. This catfish is found in the Purus River basin in Brazil.

The fish will grow in length up to 1.5 inches (3.9 centimeters). It lives in a tropical climate in water with a 6.0 – 8.0 pH, a water hardness of 2 – 25 dGH, and a temperature range of 72 – 79 °F (22 – 26 °C). It feeds on worms, benthic crustaceans, insects, and plant matter. It lays eggs in dense vegetation and adults do not guard the eggs. The female holds 2–4 eggs between her pelvic fins, where the male fertilizes them for about 30 seconds. Only then does the female swim to a suitable spot, where she attaches the very sticky eggs. The pair repeats this process until about 100 eggs have been fertilized and attached.

The fish is named in honor of Hans-Willi Schwartz (1909–1981), an aquarium-fish exporter in Manaus, Brazil, who helped collect the type specimen.

Schwartz's catfish is of commercial importance in the aquarium trade industry.

== See also ==
- List of freshwater aquarium fish species
