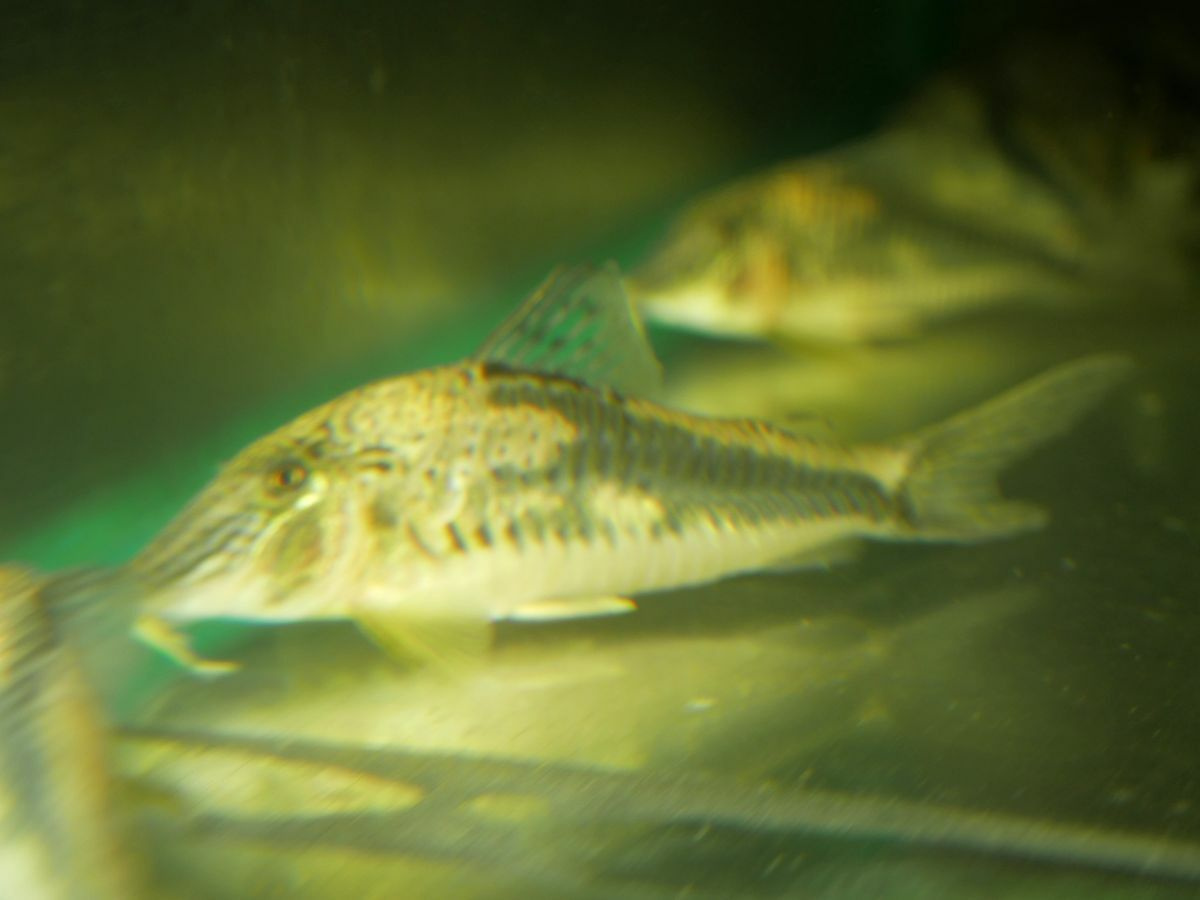

Conservation status
- Least Concern (IUCN 3.1)

Scientific classification
- Kingdom: Animalia
- Phylum: Chordata
- Class: Actinopterygii
- Order: Siluriformes
- Family: Callichthyidae
- Genus: Corydoras
- Species: C. fowleri

Binomial name
- Corydoras fowleri Böhlke, 1950

= Corydoras fowleri =

Species of fish

Corydoras fowleri, Fowler's cory, is a species of freshwater ray-finned fish belonging to the subfamily Corydoradinae, the corys, of the family Callichthyidae, the armoured catfishes. This species is found in the western part of the Amazon Basin in Colombia and Peru. This species has a maximum standard length of 6.5 cm (2.6 in).
