= Hoplisoma paragua =

Conservation status
- Data Deficient (IUCN 3.1)

Scientific classification
- Kingdom: Animalia
- Phylum: Chordata
- Class: Actinopterygii
- Order: Siluriformes
- Family: Callichthyidae
- Genus: Hoplisoma
- Species: H. paragua

Binomial name
- Hoplisoma paragua (Knaack, 2004)

Synonyms
- Corydoras paragua Knaack, 2004

Species of fish

Hoplisoma paragua, the Paragua cory, is a species of freshwater ray-finned fish belonging to the subfamily Corydoradinae, the corys, of the family Callichthyidae, the armoured catfishes. This catfish is endemic to Bolivia, where it is found in the drainage system of the Itenez River .
