= Hoplisoma parallelum =

Conservation status
- Data Deficient (IUCN 3.1)

Scientific classification
- Kingdom: Animalia
- Phylum: Chordata
- Class: Actinopterygii
- Order: Siluriformes
- Family: Callichthyidae
- Genus: Hoplisoma
- Species: H. parallelum

Binomial name
- Hoplisoma parallelum (Burgess, 1993)

Synonyms
- Corydoras parallelus Burgess, 1993

Species of fish

Hoplisoma parallelum, the two line cory, is a species of freshwater ray-finned fish belonging to the subfamily Corydoradinae, the corys, of the family Callichthyidae, the armoured catfishes. This catfish is known only from the Upper Rio Negro basin in Brazil.
