= Hoplisoma evelynae =

Conservation status
- Data Deficient (IUCN 3.1)

Scientific classification
- Kingdom: Animalia
- Phylum: Chordata
- Class: Actinopterygii
- Order: Siluriformes
- Family: Callichthyidae
- Genus: Hoplisoma
- Species: H. evelynae

Binomial name
- Hoplisoma evelynae (Rössel, 1963)

Synonyms
- Corydoras evelynae Rössel, 1963

Species of fish

Hoplisoma evelynae, Evelyn's cory, is a species of freshwater ray-finned fish belonging to the subfamily Corydoradinae, the corys, of the family Callichthyidae, the armoured catfishes. This catfish is found in Colombia, being known to occur in the upper Solimões River, and probably in eastern Brazil as well.

Hoplisoma evelynae is oviparous. The female holds a batch of between 2 and 4 eggs between her pelvic fins, and the male takes around 30 seconds to fertilise each batch. The female then swims to a suitable spot, where she attaches the very sticky eggs. They repeat this process until around 100 eggs have been fertilised and stuck to a substrate.

This species has a maximum standard length of 4 cm (1.6 in).

Hoplisoma evelynae is traded in the aquarium industry.

Hoplisoma evelynae has a specific name which was not explained by the author, Fritz Rössel, but which almost certainly honours Evelyn Axelrod, the wife of Herbert R. Axelrod.

== See also ==
- List of freshwater aquarium fish species
