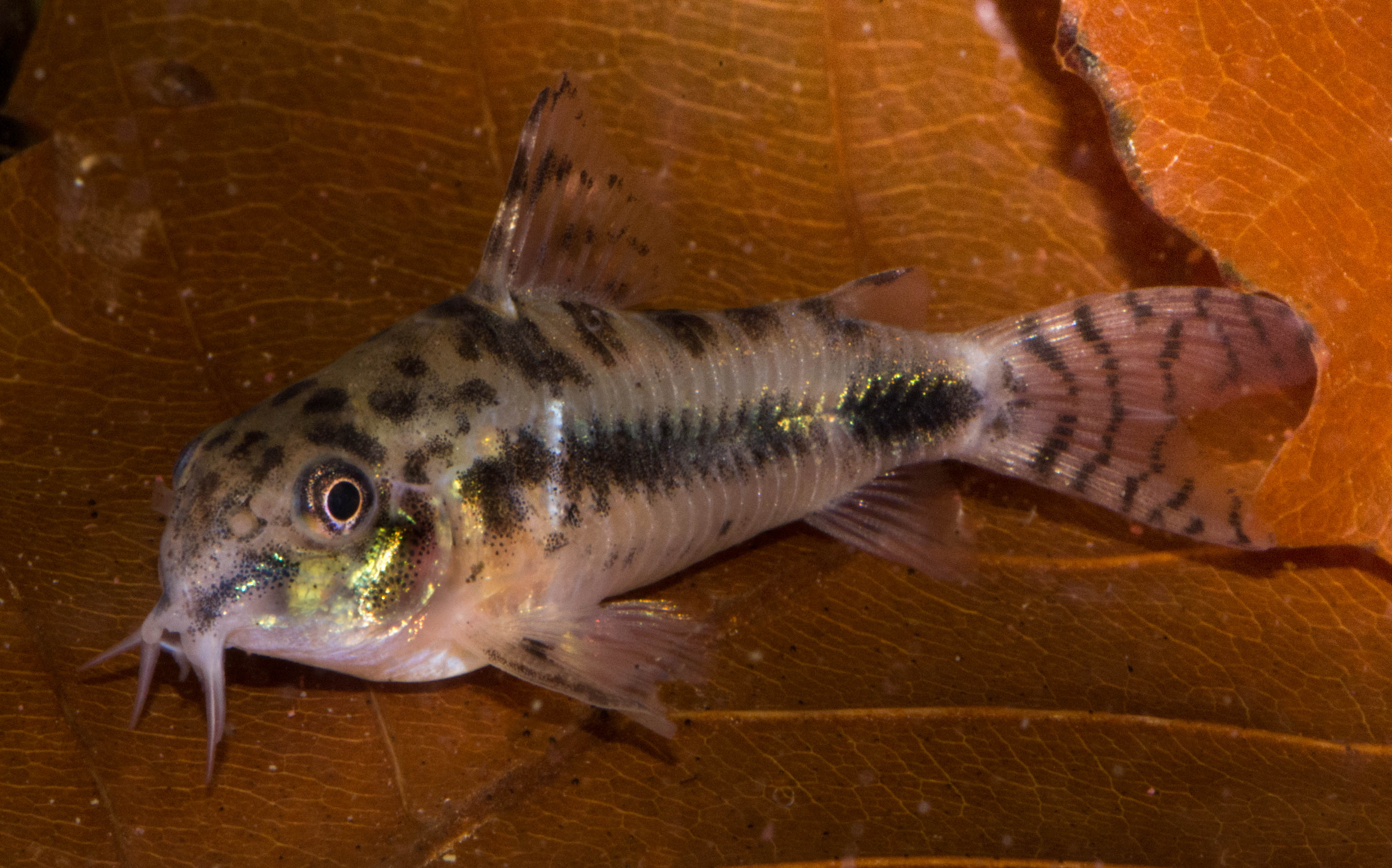
- female Corydoras habrosus

Conservation status
- Near Threatened (IUCN 3.1)

Scientific classification
- Kingdom: Animalia
- Phylum: Chordata
- Class: Actinopterygii
- Order: Siluriformes
- Family: Callichthyidae
- Genus: Hoplisoma
- Species: H. habrosum

Binomial name
- Hoplisoma habrosum (S. H. Weitzman, 1960)

Synonyms
- Corydoras habrosus S. H. Weitzman, 1960

= Salt and pepper catfish =

Species of fish

The salt and pepper catfish (Hoplisoma habrosum), or dwarf cory, is a species of freshwater ray-finned fish belonging to the subfamily Corydoradinae, the corys, of the family Callichthyidae, the armored catfishes. This catfish is found in the Upper Orinoco River basin in Venezuela and Colombia.

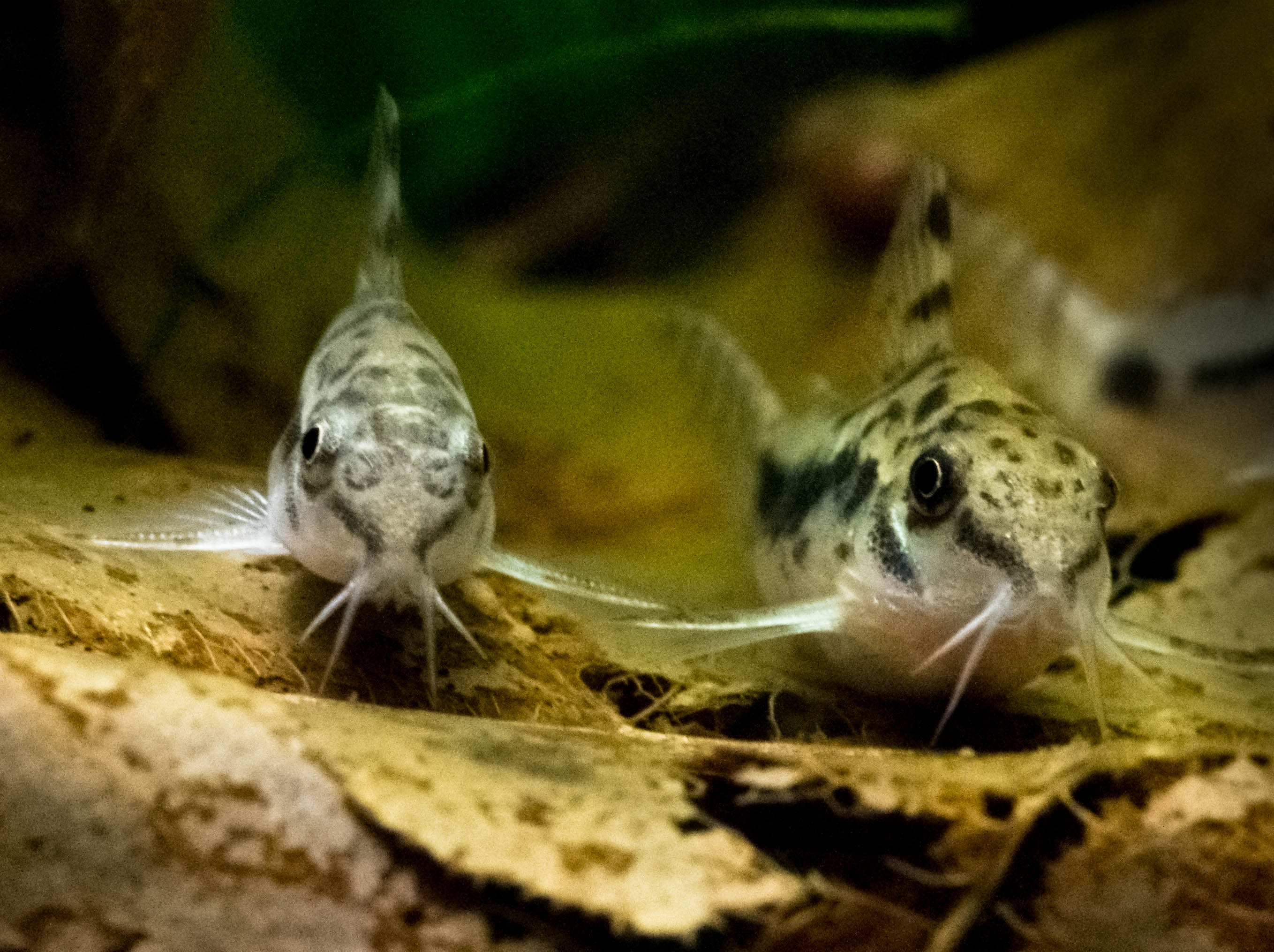
Corydoras habrosus – male on the left, female on the right

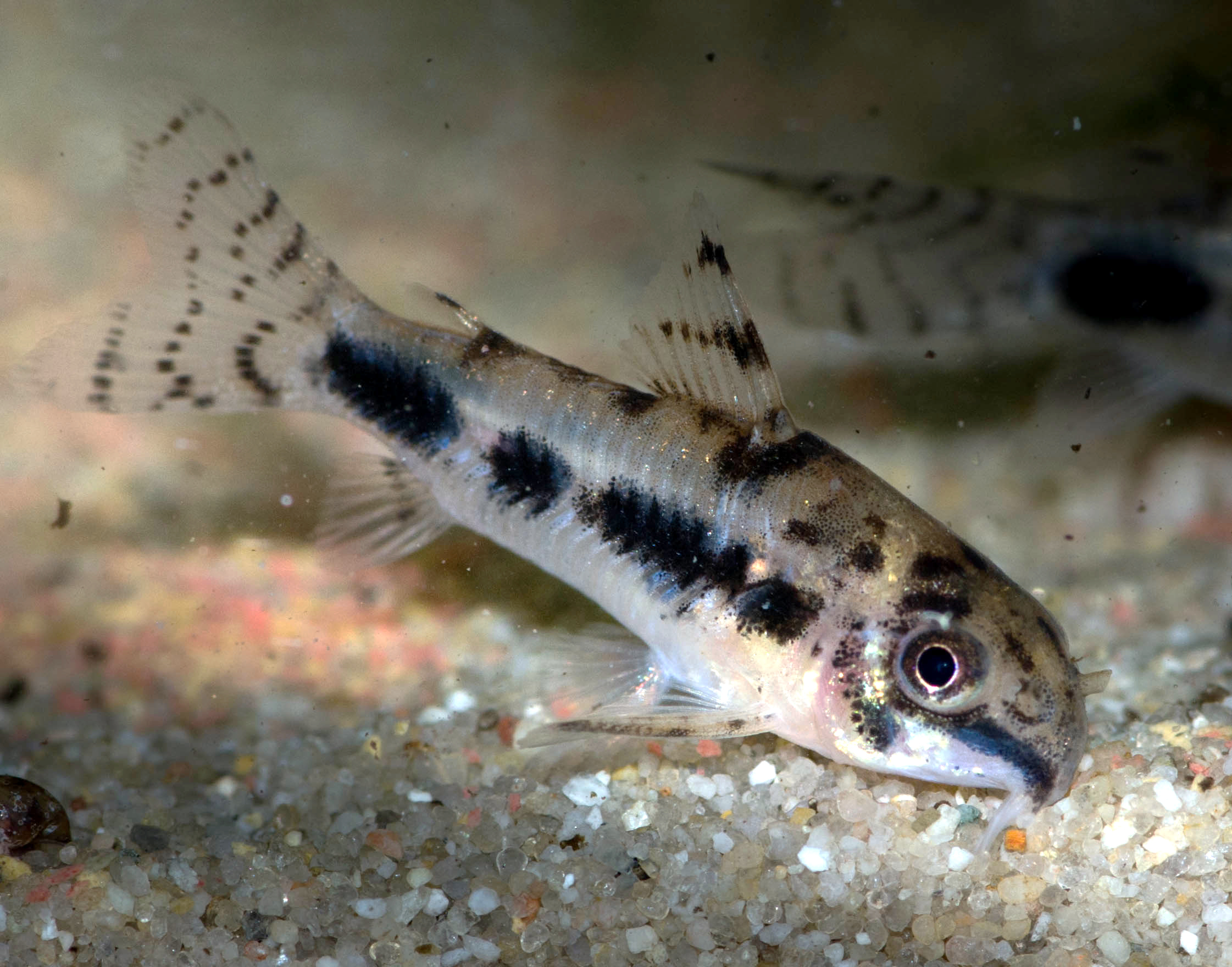
Male Corydoras habrosus

== In the wild ==
Hoplisoma habrosum is often found in periodic wetlands, large floodplains to where other species migrate seasonally. These small corydoras are prone to entrapment in receding waters, and populations can suffer during the dry season. Their natural habitat tends to be abundant in leaf litter and plant life, providing ample cover to allow these fish to roam moderately freely. As a bottom dwelling species, C. habrosus tends to stick to the lower regions of the river; however, on occasion, corydoras will dart up to the water surface to take in air. They use their intestines as an air breathing organ to absorb oxygen, and expel the remnant air out of the anus.

The fish will grow in length up to 1.4 inches (3.5 centimeters). It lives in a tropical climate in water with a 5.5 – 7.5 pH, a water hardness of 2 – 10 dGH, and a temperature of about 77 °F (25 °C). Their diet consists of worms, benthic crustaceans, insects, and plant matter.

== In the aquarium ==
It is a peaceful fish and can be kept in a community aquarium of smaller fish species such as ember tetras, clown panchax, endler guppies and small species of rasbora. It should be kept in groups of at least 6 individuals, ideally 10 or more. A shoal should be kept in a tank that is at least 14 gallons in size. Salt and pepper catfish can be fed most small sinking foods including pellets, flake food and preserved baby brine shrimp. Frozen foods such as baby brine shrimp, rotifers and cyclops can also be fed either regularly or exclusively.

=== Breeding ===
In captivity, breeding can be difficult to achieve. Some aquarists report that large water changes with relatively cold water can stimulate habrosus into spawning.

Spawning is marked by obvious behaviours; males will swim close to the female, and if multiple males are present they will surround the female, swimming from side to side quickly. The female holds an egg visibly under her ventral fin ready for fertilising. The female can then be seen to 'massage' the male's belly. The female will then choose an appropriate place to deposit her egg, usually on plants near the substrate, particularly on the underside of the leaves, but they can also be found on the aquarium glass and decor. Eggs are rarely placed on the top of the leaves or close to the water surface. The spawning male will protect the female from other males attempting to spawn with her.

== See also ==
- List of freshwater aquarium fish species
