= Corydoras cortesi =

Conservation status
- Data Deficient (IUCN 3.1)

Scientific classification
- Kingdom: Animalia
- Phylum: Chordata
- Class: Actinopterygii
- Order: Siluriformes
- Family: Callichthyidae
- Genus: Corydoras
- Species: C. cortesi

Binomial name
- Corydoras cortesi D. M. Castro, 1987

Species of fish

Corydoras cortesi is a species of freshwater ray-finned fish belonging to the subfamily Corydoradinae, the corys, of the family Callichthyidae, the armoured catfishes. This species is endemic to Colombia where it is found in the Meta and Arauca rivers.
