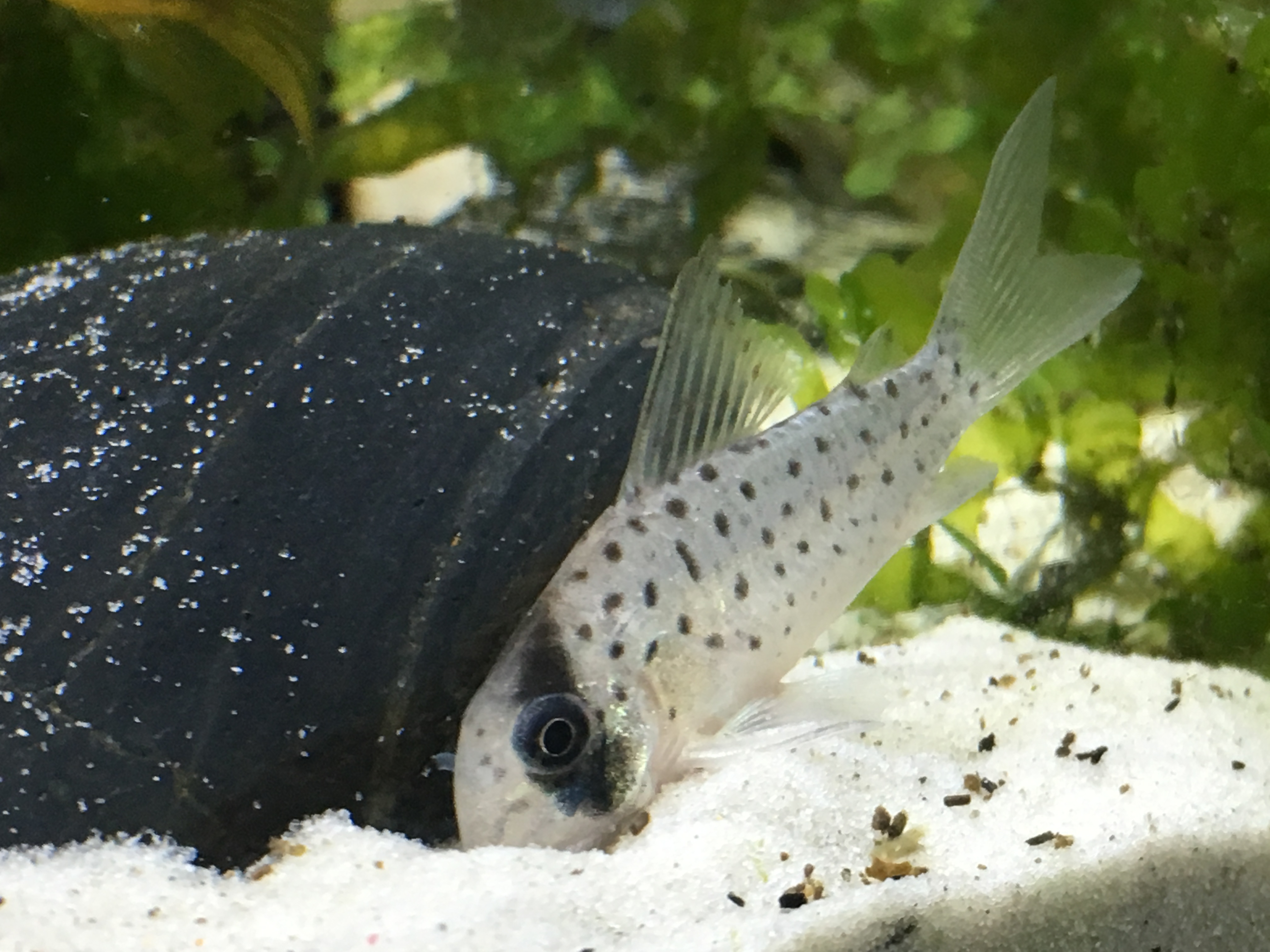

Conservation status
- Data Deficient (IUCN 3.1)

Scientific classification
- Kingdom: Animalia
- Phylum: Chordata
- Class: Actinopterygii
- Order: Siluriformes
- Family: Callichthyidae
- Genus: Hoplisoma
- Species: H. atropersonatum

Binomial name
- Hoplisoma atropersonatum (S. H. Weitzman & Nijssen, 1970)

Synonyms
- Corydoras atropersonatus S. H. Weitzman & Nijssen, 1970

= Hoplisoma atropersonatum =

Species of fish

Hoplisoma atropersonatum, the fairy catfish, is a species of freshwater ray-finned fish belonging to the subfamily Corydoradinae, the corys, of the family Callichthyidae, the armoured catfishes. This species is found in the upper Amazon River basin in Ecuador and Peru.

The fish will grow in length up to 1.8 in (4.6 cm). It lives in a tropical climate in water with a pH of 6.0–8.0, a water hardness of 2.0–25 dGH, and a temperature range of 70–75 °F (21–24 °C). It feeds on worms, benthic crustaceans, insects, and plant matter.

Hoplisoma atropersonatum is traded in the aquarium trade industry.

== See also ==
- List of freshwater aquarium fish species
