= Bluespotted corydoras =

Scientific classification
- Kingdom: Animalia
- Phylum: Chordata
- Class: Actinopterygii
- Order: Siluriformes
- Family: Callichthyidae
- Genus: Corydoras
- Species: C. melanistius

Binomial name
- Corydoras melanistius Regan, 1912

Species of fish

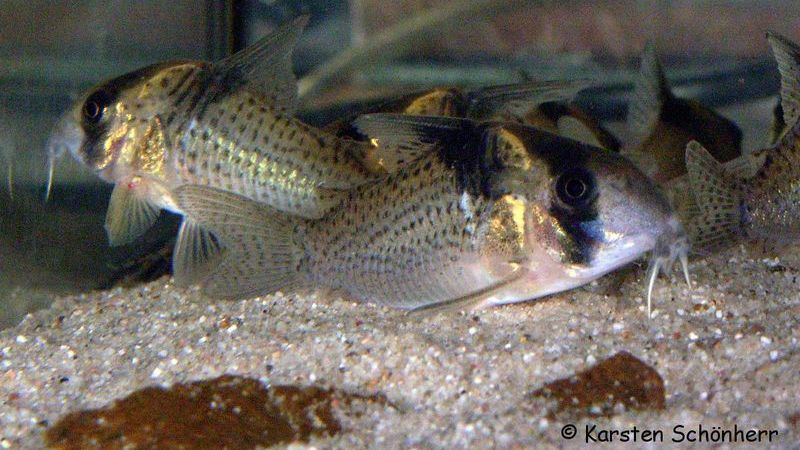
Photograph of Bluespotted Corydoras

The bluespotted corydoras, blacksail corydoras, blackspotted corydoras, dotted corydoras, Guiana cat or Guiana corydoras (Corydoras melanistius) is a tropical freshwater fish belonging to the Corydoradinae sub-family of the family Callichthyidae. It originates in inland waters in South America, and is found in the coastal rivers of Brazil, French Guiana, Guyana, and Suriname. The specific epithet melanistius means black sail, referring to the dorsal fin.

The fish will grow in length up to 5.1 centimetres (2.0 inches). It lives in a tropical climate in water with pH 6.0 - 8.0, a water hardness of 2 – 25 dGH, and a temperature range of 22–26 °C (72–79 °F). It feeds on worms, benthic crustaceans, insects, and plant matter. It lays eggs in dense vegetation and adults do not guard the eggs. The female holds 2–4 eggs between her pelvic fins, where the male fertilizes them for about 30 seconds. Only then does the female swim to a suitable spot, where she attaches the very sticky eggs. The pair repeats this process until about 100 eggs have been fertilized and attached.

The bluespotted corydoras is of commercial importance in the aquarium trade industry.

== See also ==
- List of freshwater aquarium fish species
