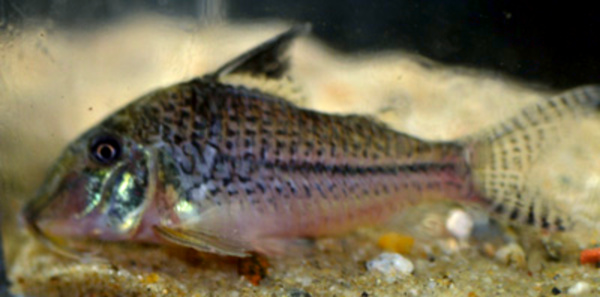

Conservation status
- Least Concern (IUCN 3.1)

Scientific classification
- Kingdom: Animalia
- Phylum: Chordata
- Class: Actinopterygii
- Order: Siluriformes
- Family: Callichthyidae
- Genus: Corydoras
- Species: C. acutus

Binomial name
- Corydoras acutus Cope, 1872

= Blacktop corydoras =

Species of fish

The blacktop corydoras (Corydoras acutus) is a tropical freshwater ray-finned fish belonging to the subfamily Corydoradinae, the corys, of the family Callichthyidae, the armoured catfishes. It originates in inland waters in South America, and is found in the Amazon River basin in Ecuador and Northern Peru. It was described by Edward Drinker Cope in 1872.

The fish will grow in length up to 1.7 inches (4.3 centimeters). It lives in a tropical climate in water with a 6.0–8.0 pH, a water hardness of 2–25 dGH, and a temperature range of 77–83 °F (25–28 °C). It feeds on worms, benthic crustaceans, insects, and plant matter. It lays eggs in dense vegetation and adults do not guard the eggs. The female holds 2–4 eggs between her pelvic fins, where the male fertilizes them for about 30 seconds. Only then does the female swim to a suitable spot, where she attaches the very sticky eggs. The pair repeats this process until about 100 eggs have been fertilized and attached.

The blacktop corydoras is of commercial importance in the aquarium trade industry.

== See also ==
- List of freshwater aquarium fish species
