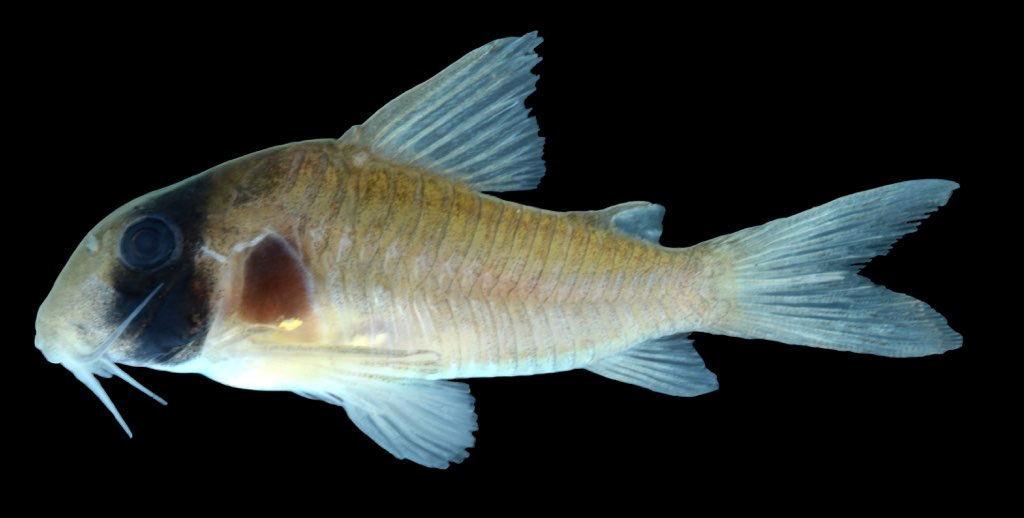

Conservation status
- Endangered (IUCN 3.1)

Scientific classification
- Kingdom: Animalia
- Phylum: Chordata
- Class: Actinopterygii
- Order: Siluriformes
- Family: Callichthyidae
- Genus: Hoplisoma
- Species: H. griseum

Binomial name
- Hoplisoma griseum (Holly, 1940)

Synonyms
- Corydoras griseus Holly, 1940

= Hoplisoma griseum =

Species of fish

Hoplisoma griseum, the gray corydoras, is a species of freshwater ray-finned fish belonging to the subfamily Corydoradinae, the corys, of the family Callichthyidae, the armoured catfishes. This catfish is only known from the Kuribrong River, a tributary of the Potaro River, in the Essequibo River basin, in the Potaro-Siparuni region of Guyana.

Hoplisoma griseum is oviparous. The female holds a batch of between 2 and 4 eggs between her pelvic fins, and the male takes around 30 seconds to fertilise each batch. The female then swims to a suitable spot, where she attaches the very sticky eggs. They repeat this process until around 100 eggs have been fertilised and stuck to a substrate.

This species has a maximum standard length of 4.2 cm (1.7 in). This species is a benthic feeder, preying on small invertebrates that live on the bottom. The gray corydoras is a facultative air breather.

Hoplisoma griseum is threatened by encroachment on its habitat by gold mining activities which use jets of water to wash away the river banks, as well as dredging the riverbed.
