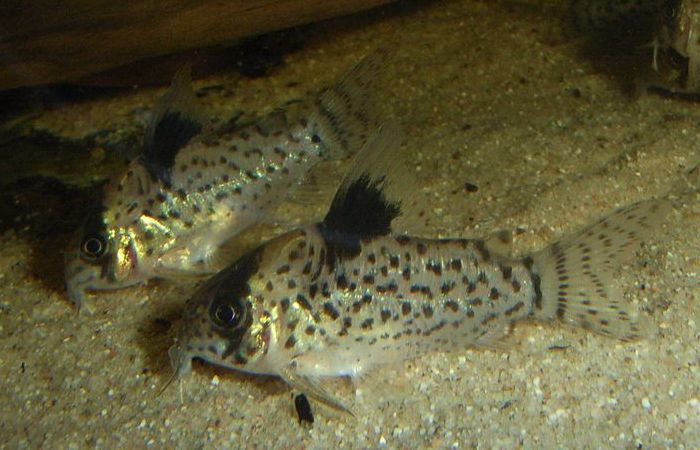

Conservation status
- Least Concern (IUCN 3.1)

Scientific classification
- Kingdom: Animalia
- Phylum: Chordata
- Class: Actinopterygii
- Order: Siluriformes
- Family: Callichthyidae
- Genus: Hoplisoma
- Species: H. leucomelas

Binomial name
- Hoplisoma leucomelas (C. H. Eigenmann & W. R. Allen, 1942)

Synonyms
- Corydoras leucomelas C. H. Eigenmann & W. R. Allen, 1942

= False spotted catfish =

Species of fish

The false spotted catfish (Hoplisoma leucomelas) is a species of freshwater ray-finned fish belonging to the subfamily Corydoradinae, the corys, of the family Callichthyidae, the armoured catfishes. This catfish is found in the Upper Amazon River basin in Bolivia, Brazil, Colombia, Ecuador and Peru.

The false spotted catfish reaches a maximum standard length of 4.5 cm (1.8 in). It is found in blackwater rivers and is a detritivore, and it is able to facultatively breathe air.

This species is known to be exported from Peru in the aquarium trade.

== See also ==
- List of freshwater aquarium fish species
