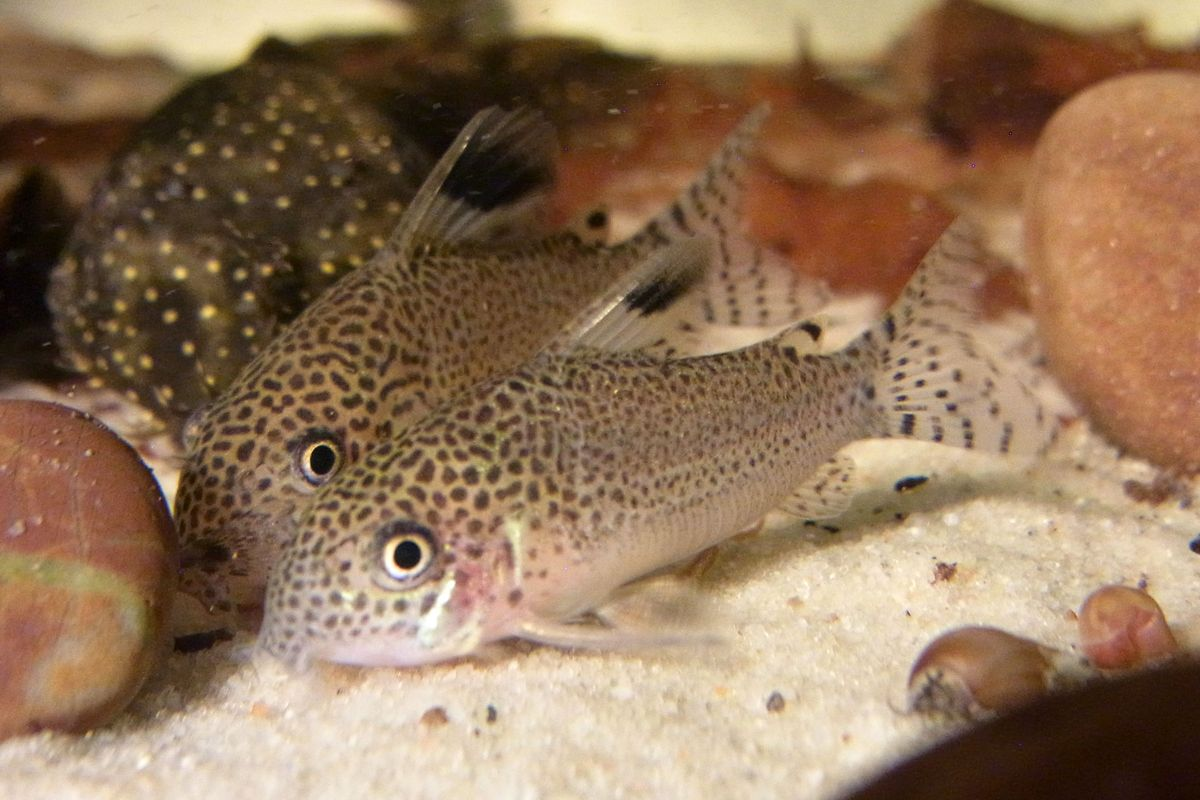

Conservation status
- Least Concern (IUCN 3.1)

Scientific classification
- Kingdom: Animalia
- Phylum: Chordata
- Class: Actinopterygii
- Order: Siluriformes
- Family: Callichthyidae
- Genus: Hoplisoma
- Species: H. punctatum

Binomial name
- Hoplisoma punctatum (Bloch, 1794)

Synonyms
- Cataphractus punctatus Bloch, 1794; Corydoras punctatus (Bloch 1794)

= Hoplisoma punctatum =

Species of fish

Hoplisoma punctatum, the spotfin corydoras, is a species of freshwater ray-finned fish belonging to the subfamily Corydoradinae, the corys, of the family Callichthyidae, the armoured catfishes. This catfish is found in the Suriname river basin and Iracoubo river basin in Suriname and French Guiana. The species is rarely seen. It is hard to tell the sex of the fish until they are an adult. The species can breed easily. The species eats many foods including shrimp pellets, blood worms, brine shrimp, and pre-soaked flake food. H. punctatum is a social fish.

== See also ==
- List of freshwater aquarium fish species
