= Corydoras microcephalus =

Scientific classification
- Domain: Eukaryota
- Kingdom: Animalia
- Phylum: Chordata
- Class: Actinopterygii
- Order: Siluriformes
- Family: Callichthyidae
- Genus: Corydoras
- Species: C. microcephalus

Binomial name
- Corydoras microcephalus Regan, 1912

Species of fish

Corydoras microcephalus is a species of callichthyid armored catfish native to Argentina.
