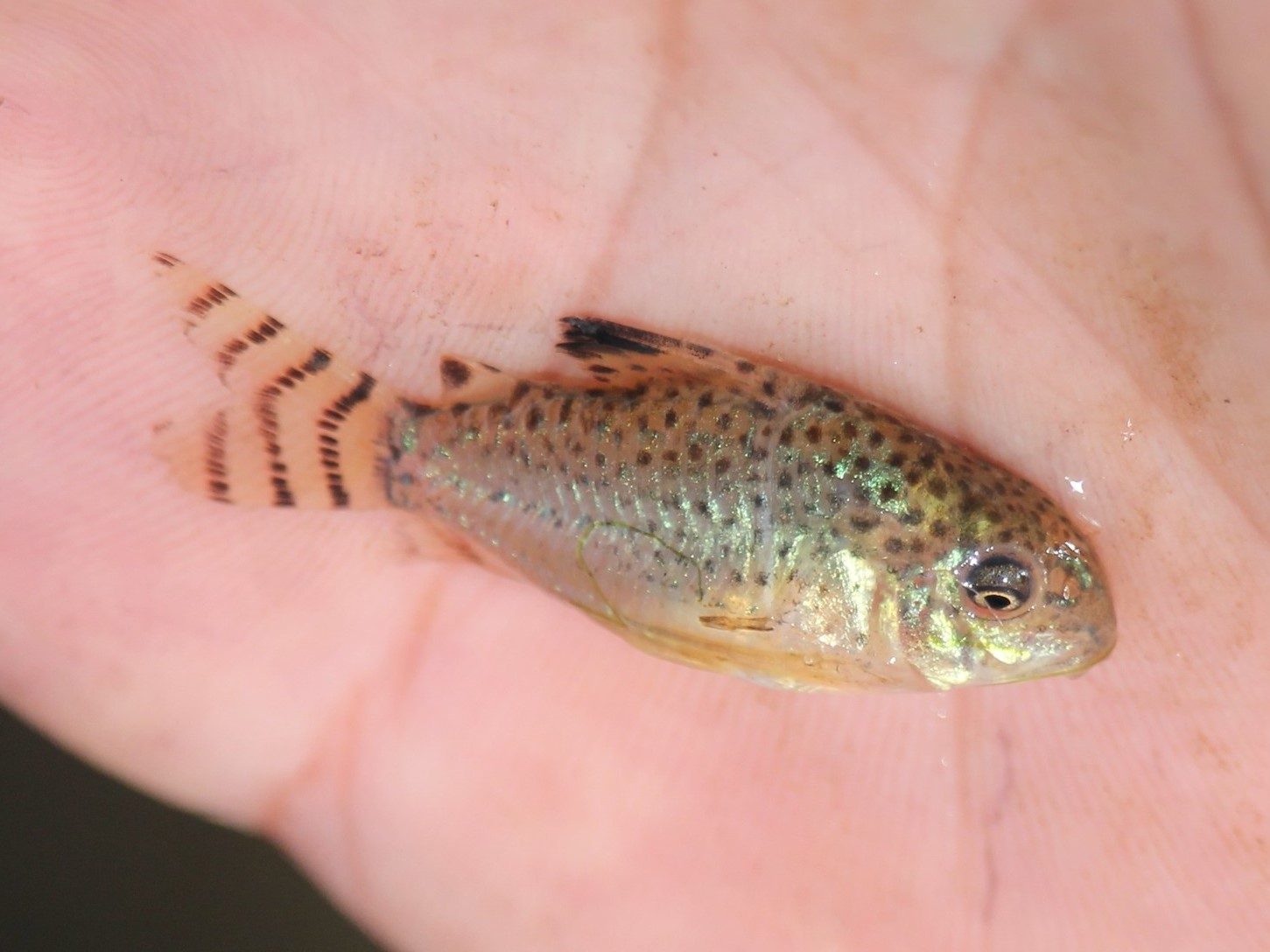

Conservation status
- Data Deficient (IUCN 3.1)

Scientific classification
- Kingdom: Animalia
- Phylum: Chordata
- Class: Actinopterygii
- Order: Siluriformes
- Family: Callichthyidae
- Genus: Hoplisoma
- Species: H. cruziense

Binomial name
- Hoplisoma cruziense (Knaack, 2002)

Synonyms
- Corydoras cruziensis Knaack, 2002

= Hoplisoma cruziense =

Species of fish

Hoplisoma cruziense, the Santa Cruz cory, is a species of freshwater ray-finned fish belonging to the subfamily Corydoradinae, the corys, of the family Callichthyidae, the armoured catfishes. This species is found in the Mamoré and Amazon river basins in Bolivia.
