= Corydoras areio =

Conservation status
- Least Concern (IUCN 3.1)

Scientific classification
- Kingdom: Animalia
- Phylum: Chordata
- Class: Actinopterygii
- Order: Siluriformes
- Family: Callichthyidae
- Genus: Corydoras
- Species: C. areio

Binomial name
- Corydoras areio Knaack, 2000

Species of fish

Corydoras areio, the hump cory, is a species of freshwater ray-finned fish belonging to the subfamily Corydoradinae, the corys, of the family Callichthyidae, the armoured catfishes. This species is found in South America where it occurs in upper basin of the Paraguay River in the Mato Grosso and Mato Grosso do Sul states of Brazil. This species reaches a standard length of 5 cm (2.0 in).
