= Corydoras coriatae =

Conservation status
- Least Concern (IUCN 3.1)

Scientific classification
- Kingdom: Animalia
- Phylum: Chordata
- Class: Actinopterygii
- Order: Siluriformes
- Family: Callichthyidae
- Genus: Corydoras
- Species: C. coriatae

Binomial name
- Corydoras coriatae W. E. Burgess, 1997

Species of fish

Corydoras coriatae the hermit cory, is a species of freshwater ray-finned fish belonging to the subfamily Corydoradinae, the corys, of the family Callichthyidae, the armoured catfishes. This species is restricted to Peru.

== Distribution ==
It is endemic to the Ucayali River basin in Peru.

== Etymology ==
The fish is named in honor of Nery Coriat, a supplier of aquarium fishes from Peru who has worked in the Peruvian fish business for the past 25 years and has contributed a great deal to the business.
