= Hoplisoma ehrhardti =

Conservation status
- Least Concern (IUCN 3.1)

Scientific classification
- Kingdom: Animalia
- Phylum: Chordata
- Class: Actinopterygii
- Order: Siluriformes
- Family: Callichthyidae
- Genus: Hoplisoma
- Species: H. ehrhardti

Binomial name
- Hoplisoma ehrhardti (Steindachner, 1910)

Synonyms
- Corydoras ehrhardti Steindachner, 1910

Species of fish

Hoplisoma ehrhardti, the olive cory, is a species of freshwater ray-finned fish belonging to the subfamily Corydoradinae, the corys, of the family Callichthyidae, the armoured catfishes. This catfish is endemic to Brazil where it occurs in the Iguaçu and Paranapanema river basins and in coastal rivers from the Ribeira de Iguape River to the Itajaí-Mirim River, in the states of São Paulo, Paraná, and Santa Catarina.

Hoplisoma ehrhardti is a demersal fish found in small streams and shallow rivers with soft substrates. It is found in small shoals and can be encountered in habitats subject to moderate amounts of human disturbance. This catfish is a facultative air breather which feeds on insect larvae. The olive cory attains a maximum standard length of 4.7 cm (1.9 in).

== See also ==
- List of freshwater aquarium fish species
