= Hoplisoma polystictum =

Conservation status
- Least Concern (IUCN 3.1)

Scientific classification
- Kingdom: Animalia
- Phylum: Chordata
- Class: Actinopterygii
- Order: Siluriformes
- Family: Callichthyidae
- Genus: Hoplisoma
- Species: H. polystictum

Binomial name
- Hoplisoma polystictum (Regan, 1912)

Synonyms
- Corydoras polystctus Regan, 1912; Corydoras virescens A. Miranda-Ribeiro, 1912

Species of fish

Hoplisoma polystictum, the fine spotted cory, is a species of freshwater ray-finned fish belonging to the subfamily Corydoradinae, the corys, of the family Callichthyidae, the armoured catfishes. This catfish is found in the Paraguay River basin in Argentina and Brazil.

The fish will grow in length up to 3.5 cm (1.4 in). It lives in a tropical climate in water with a 6.0 – 8.0 pH, a water hardness of 2 – 25 dGH, and a temperature range of 22–28 °C (72–82 °F). It feeds on worms, benthic crustaceans, insects, and plant matter. It lays eggs in dense vegetation and adults do not guard the eggs.

Astyanax bimaculatus have been found to follow C. polystictus to eat insects, crustaceans, plant debris and algae that is flushed out by the catfish's foraging.

== See also ==
- List of freshwater aquarium fish species
