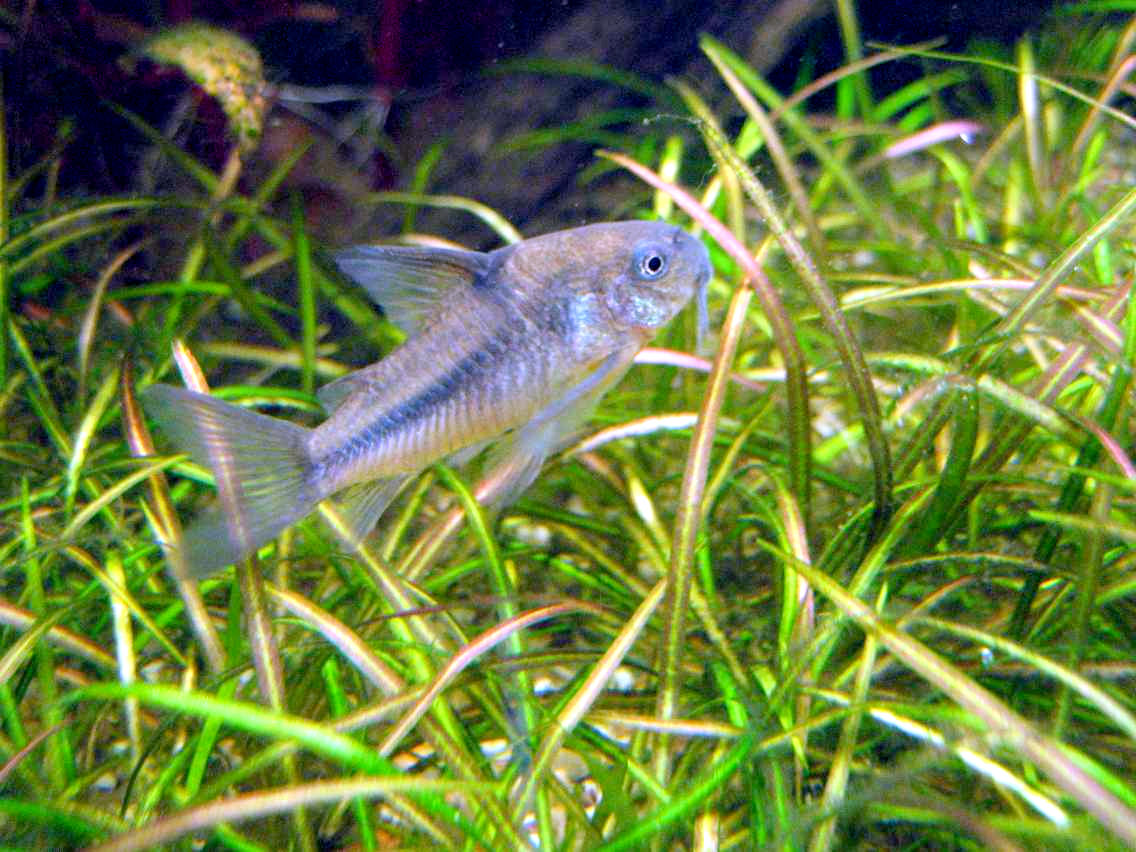

Conservation status
- Least Concern (IUCN 3.1)

Scientific classification
- Kingdom: Animalia
- Phylum: Chordata
- Class: Actinopterygii
- Division: Teleostei
- Order: Siluriformes
- Family: Callichthyidae
- Genus: Hoplisoma
- Species: H. nattereri

Binomial name
- Hoplisoma nattereri (Steindachner, 1876)

Synonyms
- Corydoras nattereri Steindachner, 1876

= Blue corydoras =

Species of fish

The blue corydoras or Natterer's catfish (Hoplisoma nattereri) is a species of freshwater ray-finned fish belonging to the subfamily Corydoradinae, the corys, of the family Callichthyidae, the armoured catfishes. This catfish is endemic to eastern Brazil, where it is found from Espírito Santo to Paraná.

== Etymology ==
The blue corydoras has a specific name, nattereri, which honours Franz Steindachner's fellow Austrian, the naturalist and explorer Johann Natterer, who collected the holotype of this species.

== Description ==
The fish has clear fins with no pattern. The ventrals are light, opaque yellow. Highlights seen about the gill plates are green. The belly is yellowish. It has a pronounced dark stripe along the length of the body. The general color of the body is light, tending towards yellow. Its eyes are gold. It will grow in length up to 5.4 centimetres (2.1 inches).

== Habitat ==
It lives in a tropical climate in water with a 6.0 – 8.0 pH, a water hardness of 2 – 25 dGH, and a temperature range of 20–23 °C (68–73 °F). It feeds on worms, benthic crustaceans, insects, and plant matter. It lays eggs in dense vegetation, and adults do not guard the eggs.

== Aquarium trade ==
The blue corydoras is of commercial importance in the aquarium trade industry.

== See also ==
- List of freshwater aquarium fish species
