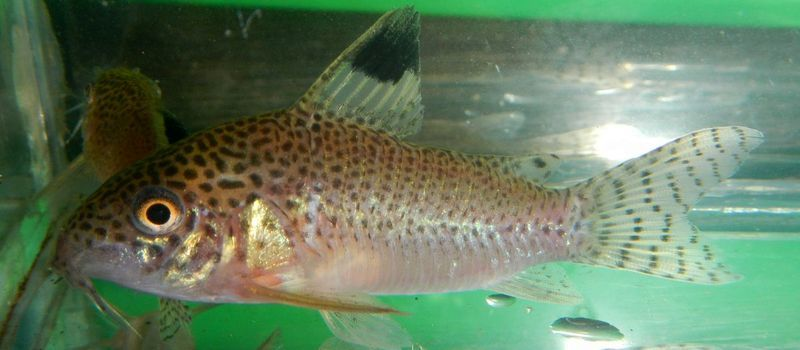
- Spotfin corydoras (Hoplisoma punctatum)

Scientific classification
- Kingdom: Animalia
- Phylum: Chordata
- Class: Actinopterygii
- Division: Teleostei
- Order: Siluriformes
- Family: Callichthyidae
- Subfamily: Corydoradinae
- Genus: Hoplisoma; Swainson, 1838

Type species
- Cataphractus punctatus Bloch, 1794

Synonyms
- Urkumayu Alonso, Terán, Aguilera, Montes, Serra Alanís, Calviño, Vera-Alcaraz, Cardoso, Koerber & Mirande, 2024

= Hoplisoma =

Hoplisoma Temporal range: Late Paleocene–present

Genus of fishes

Hoplisoma is a genus of freshwater ray-finned fishes belonging to the subfamily Corydoradinae, the corys, of the family Callichthyidae, the armoured catfishes. The catfishes in this genus are found in South America.

== Taxonomy ==
Hoplisoma was first proposed as a genus in 1838 by the English naturalist William Swainson with Cataphractus punctatus, a species described in 1784 by Marcus Elieser Bloch from Suriname, as its only species and designated as its type species by Swainson. For a long period this taxon was regarded as a synonym of Corydoras but it was resurrected as a valid genus by a phylogenomic analysis published in 2025. This genus is classified in the subfamily Corydoradinae of the armoured catfish family Callichtyidae in the suborder Loricarioidei in the catfish order Siluriformes.

== Etymology ==
Hoplisoma combines hoplon, meaning "shield" or "armour", with soma, which means "body", a reference to the bony scutes on the flanks of these fishes.

== Species ==
Hoplisoma contains the following valid species:

- Hoplisoma acrense (Nijssen, 1972)
- Hoplisoma adolfoi (Burgess, 1982)
- Hoplisoma albolineatum (Knaack, 2004)
- Hoplisoma amphibelum (Cope, 1872)
- Hoplisoma apiaka (Espíndola, Spencer, Rocha & Britto, 2014)
- Hoplisoma araguaiaense (Sands, 1990)
- Hoplisoma armatum (Günther, 1868)
- Hoplisoma atropersonatum (Weitzman & Nijssen, 1970)
- Hoplisoma axelrodi (Rössel, 1962)
- Hoplisoma baderi (Geisler, 1969)
- Hoplisoma benattii (Espíndola, Tencatt, Pupo, Villa-Verde & Britto, 2018)
- Hoplisoma bicolor (Nijssen & Isbrücker, 1967)
- Hoplisoma boehlkei (Nijssen & Isbrücker, 1982)
- Hoplisoma boesemani (Nijssen & Isbrücker, 1967)
- Hoplisoma bondi (Gosline, 1940)
- Hoplisoma breei (Isbrücker & Nijssen, 1992)
- Hoplisoma brevirostre (Fraser-Brunner, 1947)
- Hoplisoma burgessi (Axelrod, 1987)
- Hoplisoma carlae (Nijssen & Isbrücker, 1983)
- Hoplisoma caudimaculatum (Rössel, 1961)
- Hoplisoma cochui (Myers & Weitzman, 1954)
- Hoplisoma colossus (Tencatt, Grant & Bentley, 2023)
- Hoplisoma concolor (Weitzman, 1961)
- Hoplisoma copei (Nijssen & Isbrücker, 1986)
- Hoplisoma coppenamense (Nijssen, 1970)
- Hoplisoma cruziense (Knaack, 2002)
- Hoplisoma davidsandsi (B. Black, 1987)
- Hoplisoma diphyes (Axenrot & S. Kullander, 2003)
- Hoplisoma duplicareum (Sands, 1995)
- Hoplisoma ehrhardti (Steindachner, 1910)
- Hoplisoma esperanzae (Castro, 1987)
- Hoplisoma evelynae (Rössel, 1963)
- Hoplisoma eversi (Tencatt & Britto, 2016)
- Hoplisoma flaveolum (Ihering, 1911)
- Hoplisoma froehlichi (Tencatt, Britto & Pavanelli, 2016)
- Hoplisoma gladysae (Calviño & Alonso, 2010)
- Hoplisoma gossei (Nijssen, 1972)
- Hoplisoma granti (Tencatt, Lima & Britto, 2019)
- Hoplisoma griseum (Holly, 1940)
- Hoplisoma gryphus (Tencatt, Britto & Pavanelli, 2014)
- Hoplisoma guianensis (Nijssen, 1970)
- Hoplisoma habrosum (Weitzman. 1960)
- Hoplisoma hypnos (Tencatt, Ohara, Sousa & Britto, 2022)
- Hoplisoma julii (Steindachner, 1906)
- Hoplisoma kanei (Grant, 1998)
- Hoplisoma knaacki (Tencatt & Evers, 2016)
- Hoplisoma lacrimostigmata (Tencatt, Britto & Pavanelli, 2014)
- Hoplisoma leucomelas (C. H. Eigenmann & W. Allen, 1942)
- Hoplisoma longipinne (Knaack, 2007)
- Hoplisoma loretoense (Nijssen & Isbrücker, 1986)
- Hoplisoma loxozonum (Nijssen & Isbrücker, 1983)
- Hoplisoma lymnades (Tencatt, Vera-Alcaraz, Britto & Pavanelli, 2013)
- Hoplisoma melanistium (Regan, 1912)
- Hoplisoma melini (Lönnberg & Rendahl, 1930)
- Hoplisoma metae (C. H. Eigenmann, 1914)
- Hoplisoma micracanthus (Regan, 1912)
- Hoplisoma multimaculatum (Steindachner, 1907)
- Hoplisoma nattereri (Steindachner, 1876)
- Hoplisoma noxium Tencatt, Ohara, Carvalho, Grant & Britto, 2025
- Hoplisoma oiapoquense (Nijssen, 1972)
- Hoplisoma ortegai (Britto, Lima & Hidalgo, 2007)
- Hoplisoma osteocarum (Böhlke, 1951)
- Hoplisoma osvaldoi Alonso, Terán, Aguilera, Montes, Serra Alanís, Calviño, Vera-Alcaraz, Cardoso, Koerber & Mirande, 2024
- Hoplisoma paleatum (Jenyns, 1842)
- Hoplisoma panda (Nijssen & Isbrücker, 1971)
- Hoplisoma paragua (Knaack, 2004)
- Hoplisoma parallelum (Burgess 1993)
- Hoplisoma pavanelliae (Tencatt & Ohara 2016)
- Hoplisoma petracinii (Calviño & Alonso, 2010)
- Hoplisoma polystictum (Regan, 1912)
- Hoplisoma potaroense (Myers, 1927)
- Hoplisoma psamathos (Tencatt, Ohara, Sousa & Britto, 2022)
- Hoplisoma punctatum (Bloch, 1794)
- Hoplisoma reynoldsi (Myers & Weitzman, 1960)
- Hoplisoma rikbaktsa (Lima & Britto, 2020)
- Hoplisoma sanchesi (Nijssen & Isbrücker, 1967)
- Hoplisoma schwartzi (Rössel, 1963)
- Hoplisoma simile (Hieronimus, 1991)
- Hoplisoma sipaliwini (Hoedeman, 1965)
- Hoplisoma steindachneri (Isbrücker & Nijssen, 1973)
- Hoplisoma sterbai (Knaack, 1962)
- Hoplisoma surinamense (Nijssen, 1970)
- Hoplisoma tenebrosum Tencatt, Ohara, Carvalho, Grant & Britto, 2025
- Hoplisoma tenharim Lam, Cassaro, Ohara & Pastana, 2026
- Hoplisoma thanatos (Tencatt, Ohara, Sousa & Britto, 2022)
- Hoplisoma trilineatum (Cope, 1872)
- Hoplisoma tukano (Britto & Lima, 2003)
- Hoplisoma urucu (Britto, Wosiacki & Montag, 2009)
- Hoplisoma weitzmani (Nijssen, 1971)
- Hoplisoma xinguense (Nijssen, 1972)

In addition, the fossil species †Hoplisoma revelatum (Cockerell, 1925) is known from the Late Paleocene of Argentina, making it the oldest known confirmed loricarioid from the fossil record.
