= Hoplisoma longipinne =

Scientific classification
- Kingdom: Animalia
- Phylum: Chordata
- Class: Actinopterygii
- Order: Siluriformes
- Family: Callichthyidae
- Genus: Hoplisoma
- Species: H. longipinne

Binomial name
- Hoplisoma longipinne (Knaack, 2007)

Synonyms
- Corydoras longipinnis Knaack, 2007

Species of tropical freshwater fish

Hoplisoma longipinne, the long-finned cory, is a species of freshwater ray-finned fish belonging to the subfamily Corydoradinae, the corys, of the family Callichthyidae, the armoured catfishes. This catfish is found in the Río Dulce in Argentina.
