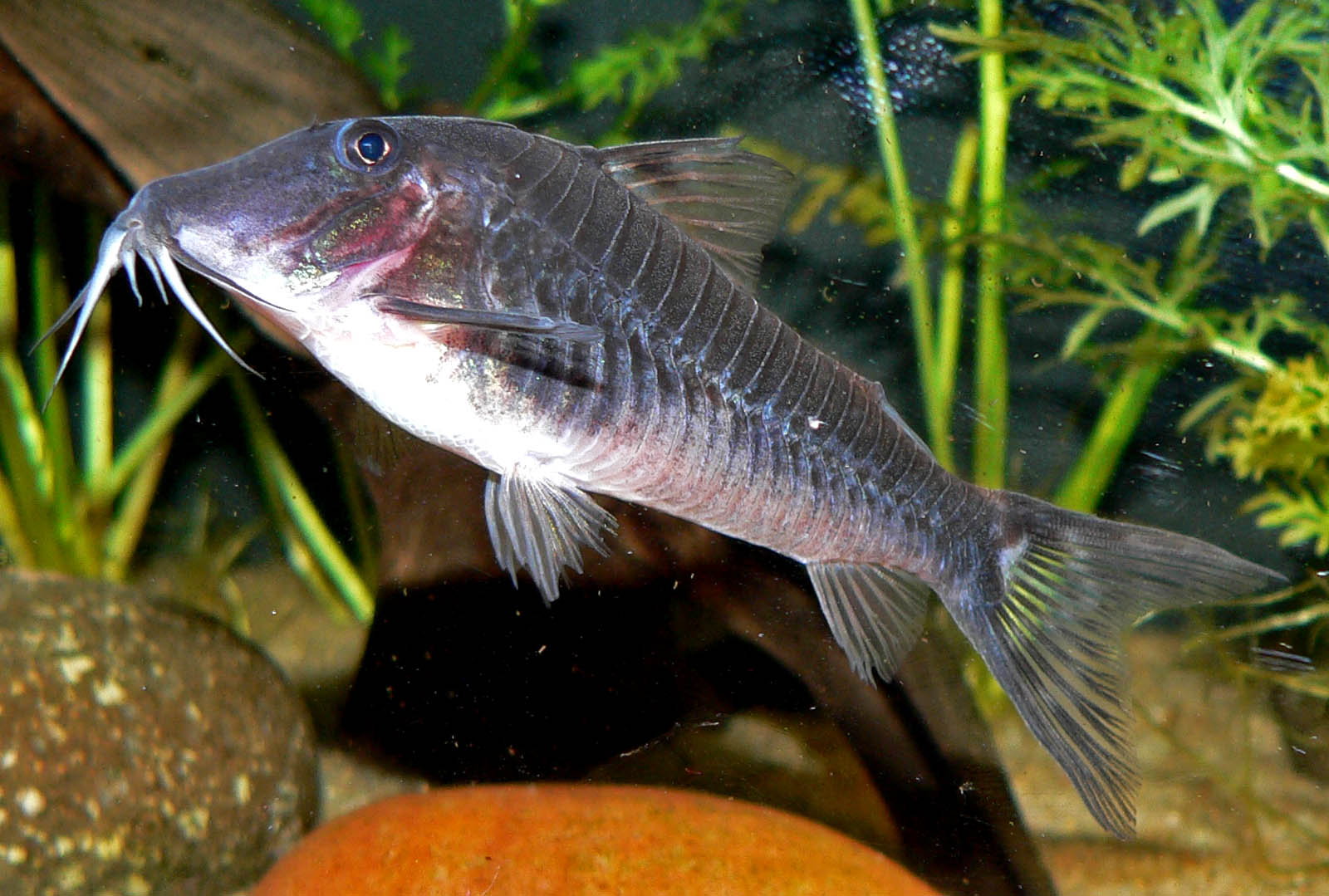
- Captive C. semiaquilus

Conservation status
- Least Concern (IUCN 3.1)

Scientific classification
- Kingdom: Animalia
- Phylum: Chordata
- Class: Actinopterygii
- Order: Siluriformes
- Family: Callichthyidae
- Genus: Corydoras
- Species: C. semiaquilus

Binomial name
- Corydoras semiaquilus S. H. Weitzman, 1964

= Corydoras semiaquilus =

Species of fish

Corydoras semiaquilus, the Peru black cory, is a species of freshwater ray-finned fish belonging to the subfamily Corydoradinae, the corys, of the family Callichthyidae, the armoured catfishes. It is endemic to the Amazon Basin in South America.

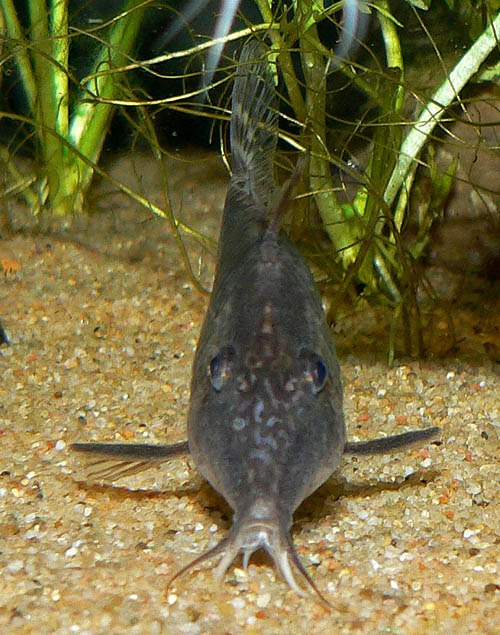

This species has been recorded as growing to 6 cm (2.4 in) in length. It inhabits water within the range of 6.0–8.0 pH, a water hardness of 2.0–25 dGH, and a temperature range of 22–26 °C (72–79 °F). It feeds on worms, benthic crustaceans, insects, and plant matter. It lays eggs in dense vegetation; adults do not guard the eggs.

== See also ==
- List of freshwater aquarium fish species
