= Pink corydoras =

Conservation status
- Vulnerable (IUCN 3.1)

Scientific classification
- Kingdom: Animalia
- Phylum: Chordata
- Class: Actinopterygii
- Order: Siluriformes
- Family: Callichthyidae
- Genus: Hoplisoma
- Species: H. axelrodi

Binomial name
- Hoplisoma axelrodi (Rössel, 1962)

Synonyms
- Corydoras axelrodi Rössel, 1962

Species of fish

The pink corydoras (Hoplisoma axelrodi) is a species of freshwater ray-finned fish belonging to the subfamily Corydoradinae, the corys, of the family Callichthyidae, the armoured catfishes. This species is found in the Meta River basin in Colombia. A maximum body length of 4.2 cm has been reported. It was named in honor of pet-book publisher Herbert R. Axelrod (1927–2017), who helped collect type series and sent it to the Senckenberg Museum in Frankfurt, Germany.

== See also ==
- List of freshwater aquarium fish species
