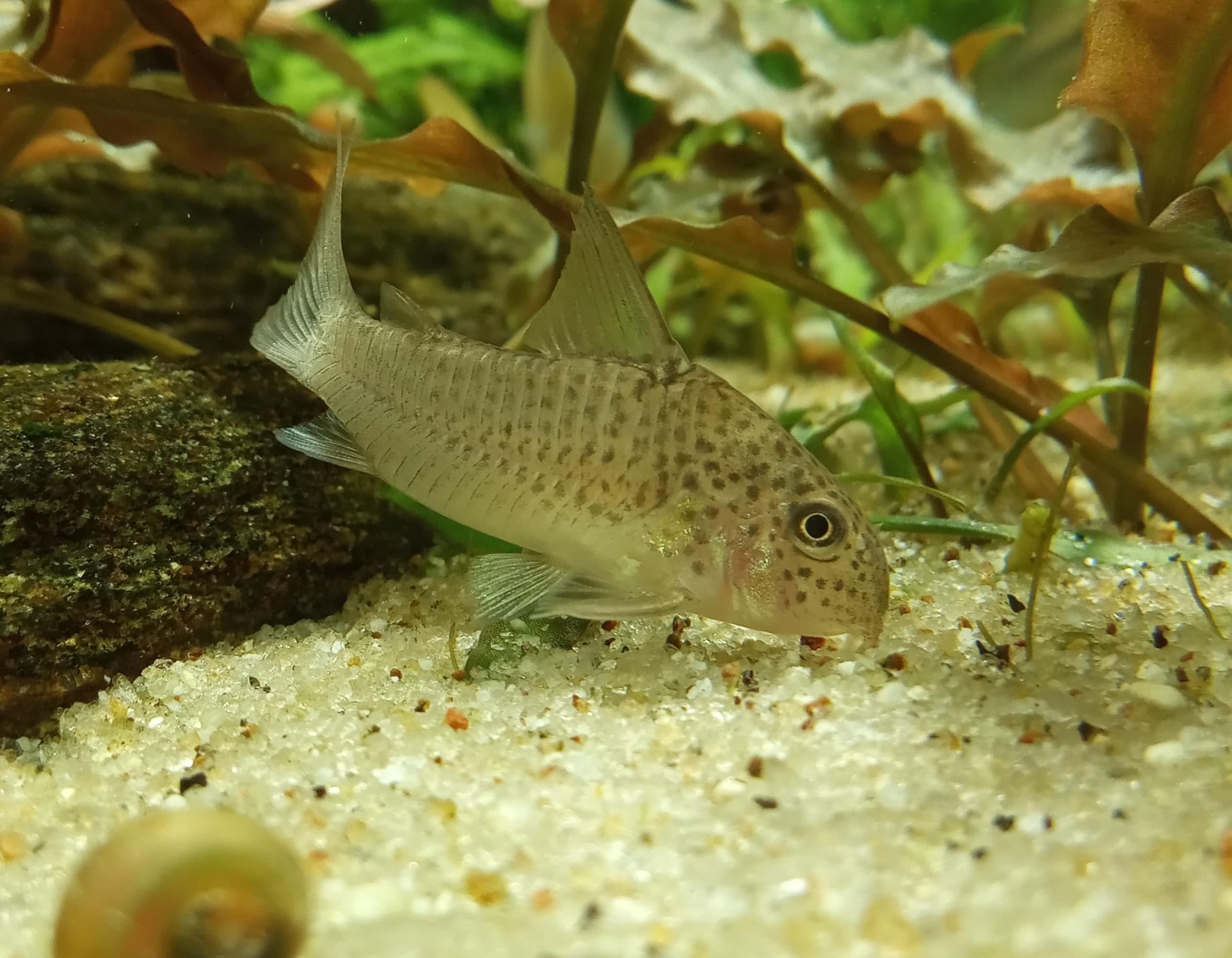

Conservation status
- Least Concern (IUCN 3.1)

Scientific classification
- Kingdom: Animalia
- Phylum: Chordata
- Class: Actinopterygii
- Order: Siluriformes
- Family: Callichthyidae
- Genus: Hoplisoma
- Species: H. xinguense

Binomial name
- Hoplisoma xinguense (Nijssen, 1972)

Synonyms
- Corydoras xinguensis Nijssen, 1972

= Xingu corydoras =

Species of fish

The Xingu corydoras (Hoplisoma xinguense) is a species of freshwater ray-finned fish belonging to the subfamily Corydoradinae, the corys, of the family Callichthyidae, the armoured catfishes. This catfish is endemic to Brazil, where it is found in the Xingu drainage system in Pará and Mato Grosso.

== Taxonomy ==
The Xingu corydoras was first formally described as Corydoras xinguensis in 1972 by the Dutch ichthyologist Han Nijssen, with its type locality given as Suia Missú Creek, a tributary of the upper Rio Xingu near Posto Diauarum, around 11°15'S, 53°00'W in Mato Grosso. It had been known in the aquarium trade as C055, C056, C105, C106, C107 and C108, the c-numbers being allocated to different colour variants according to the system oroiginally devised for Corydoras catfishes by the German fishkeeping magazine DATZ. In 2025, a phylogenetic study placed this species in lineage 9 in its former genus, and the genus name was revised to Hoplisoma.

== Description ==
Xingu corydoras are grey with dark spots over the upper body above the lateral line; the lower body and underside are uniform grey. There are spots on the dorsal and pectoral fin spines with faint spotting on the caudal fin. As they mature, they develop a pinkish tinge to their main body colouration, which is broken by brown speckles. This species attains a maximum standard length of 3.7 cm (1.5 in), and it is a facultative air breather.

== Distribution ==
The Xingu corydoras is endemic to Brazil, where it is known with certainty only from the basin of the Xingu River. Records from the basin of the Tocantins River are thought to be misidentifications.

== Utilisation ==
The Xingu corydoras is allowed to be exported from Brazil for the aquarium trade.

== See also ==
- List of freshwater aquarium fish species
