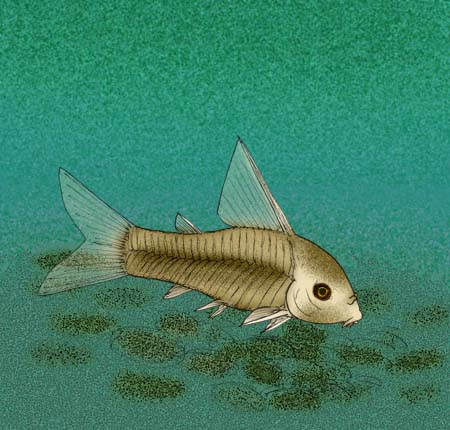
- Life restoration

Scientific classification
- Kingdom: Animalia
- Phylum: Chordata
- Class: Actinopterygii
- Division: Teleostei
- Order: Siluriformes
- Family: Callichthyidae
- Genus: Hoplisoma
- Species: †H. revelatum

Binomial name
- †Hoplisoma revelatum (Cockerell, 1925)

Synonyms
- Corydoras revelatus Cockerell, 1925

= Hoplisoma revelatum =

Hoplisoma revelatum Temporal range: Late Paleocene, ~58.5–58.2 Ma

Extinct species of fish

Hoplisoma revelatum is an extinct species of the genus Hoplisoma from the Late Paleocene Maíz Gordo Formation of Argentina, making it the oldest member of Callichthyidae. The fish is overall similar to living members of the species though it had a more dorsoventrally flattened body and shorter snout. When originally being described, the fish was originally placed within the genus Corydoras only to be formally placed in Hoplisoma a century later. H. revelatum would have most likely either lived in a braided river system or an alkaline lake. During this time, the region was transitioning between a more arid to a more humid though seasonal climate

== History ==
The holotype of Hoplisoma revelatum (BMNH P.13679) was originally found by Theodore D. A. Cockerell while collecting insect fossils from green shales in the Jujuy Province of Argentina. Though at the time these strata were known as either the Sunchal or Margas Verdes formation, more recent literature refer them to the Late Paleocene Maíz Gordo Formation. This specimen was later described by Cockerell under the name Corydoras revelatus in 1925 though this original description lacks any photos of the specimen. Two more specimens were described by David Bardack in 1961 from a locality along the Cañas River in the Salta Province. A portion of the book Phylogeny and classification of neotropical fishes focused on Callichthyidae was written by Roberto E. Reis in 1998. The species was covered in this section along with the exact placement of the fish within Callichthyidae. The placement out of Corydoras was discussed more in a 2024 paper by Angelica C Dias and coauthors. Within this paper they moved the species into Hoplisoma.

== Description ==
Similar to the living members of the genus, Hoplisoma revelatum is a very small fish with a total body length of between 31–38 millimetres (1.2–1.5 in). Compared to living genera, H. revelatumis notably more dorsoventrally flattened than in living species. The deepest part of the body on this specimens is about 9 millimetres (0.35 in) with this being located at the dorsal fin. Though the holotype and later specimens slightly differ in body length, the body depth stays consistent. The skull of the fish is slightly different from modern relatives with the eyes being slightly more forward on the skull. The frontal fontanel of the fish is also longer than in living species. As seen in living species of the genus, the sutures of the dermocranium slightly differ between the three specimens.

A total of twenty three dorsal and twenty two ventral lateral scutes are found along the body of H. revelatum. Both of the unpaired fins are made up of six fin rays. The fin spines of the dorsal and anal fins differ with the dorsal fin spine being thicker than the spine on the anal fin. There is also slight variation in the thickness of the dorsal fin spine between specimens. Though seen in living species, none of the specimens of H. revelatum preserve an adipose fin. The caudal fin is made up of twenty eight fin rays with the five on dorsal and ventral-most fin rays being unbranched.

== Classification ==
Though placed within the genus by Cockerell, the exact reasoning for the placement of Hoplisoma revelatum wasn't given. Bardack's description of new material allowed for a more confident assignment to Corydoras based on the characters given by Gosline in 1940. The section of the book by Reis went even more in depth with skull characters, placing the species in a clade containing Corydoras and Brochis. Based on the fact that the supraoccipital and nuchal plate are in contact with one another, it has been suggested that the species should instead by placed within Scleromystax. The species is considered the earliest member of Callichthyidae along with Corydoradinae. This placement shows that the two subfamilies split off from one another by the Late Paleocene. Due to this placement, H. revelatum has been used to calibrate phylogenies such as the one done by Tatiane C. Mariguela and coauthors in 2013. In 2024, Dias and coauthors formally placed the species within the genus Hoplisoma due to its shorter mesethmoid.

== Paleoenvironment ==
The Maíz Gordo Formation was deposited within two environments, being both a braided floodplain and a brackish alkaline lake. This lake would have been disconnected from the surrounding rivers most of the time though there were short periods of time where the rivers empty into it. Based on pollen, the area surrounding the lake would have been covered in a large amount of vegetation and periodically flooded. This pollen has been found to belong to evening primroses, palms, and members of Pandanaceae. Based on the minerals within the strata, the area most likely went from a more arid climate to a more humid but seasonal climate. A large amount of the other fossils found at the formation are insects with these representing eleven orders though only odonates, hemipterans, and mecopterans have been described. Notoungulates, side-necked turtles, and sebecids are also known from the formation though they are much less well known.
