= Han Nijssen =

Dutch ichthyologist

Han Nijssen (Amsterdam, October 28, 1935 – June 25, 2013) was a Dutch ichthyologist.

Nijssen was born in Amsterdam and obtained his PhD at the University of Amsterdam in May 1970 with the dissertation Revision of the Surinam catfishes of the genus Corydoras. Later he was a curator at Zoölogisch Museum in Amsterdam. Nijssen worked extensively with fish from South America, and was the author of several species, e.g. Corydoras weitzmani and Corydoras xinguensis. Collaborating with Isaäc Isbrücker he described, among others, the group Hypancistrus and the species Hypancistrus zebra and Corydoras panda. He also collaborated with Sven O. Kullander.

== Taxa named in his honor ==
- The species Corydoras nijsseni and Apistogramma nijsseni are named after him.
- Metaloricaria nijsseni is named after him.
- Hypomasticus nijsseni

== Publications (incomplete) ==
- Han Nijssen & S.J. de Groot, De vissen van Nederland. (1987)
- Sven O. Kullander & Han Nijssen, The Cichlids of Surinam: Teleostei: Labroidei (1989)
- Han Nijssen, Veldgids Zeevissen ("Field guide for saltwater fish"), KNNV 2009, ISBN 9789050111393

== See also ==
- Category:Taxa named by Han Nijssen
