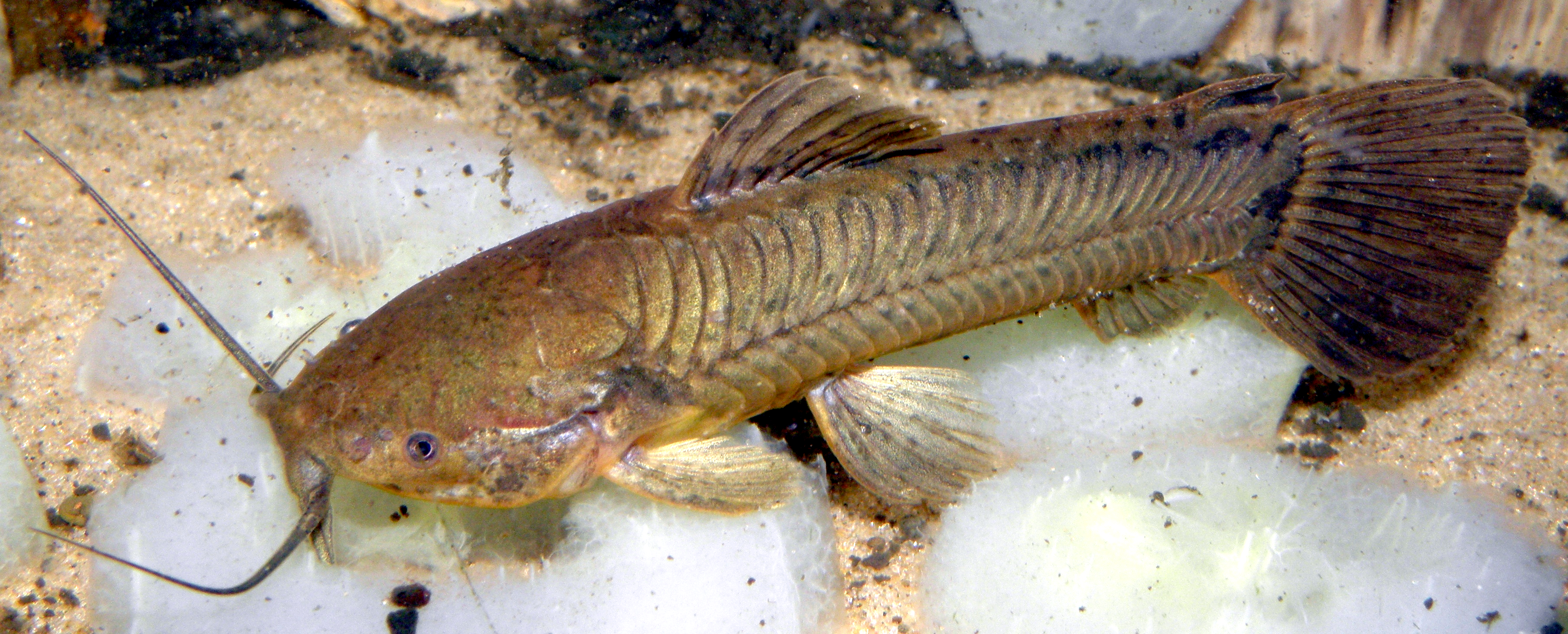
- Callichthys callichthys

Scientific classification
- Kingdom: Animalia
- Phylum: Chordata
- Class: Actinopterygii
- Division: Teleostei
- Order: Siluriformes
- Suborder: Loricarioidei
- Family: Callichthyidae; Bonaparte, 1838

Type genus
- Callichthys Scopoli, 1777

Genera
- see text

= Callichthyidae =

Callichthyidae Temporal range: 58.5–0 Ma Late Paleocene–Present

Family of fishes

Callichthyidae is a family of catfishes (order Siluriformes), called armored catfishes due to the two rows of bony plates (or scutes) along the lengths of their bodies. It contains some of the most popular freshwater aquarium fish, such as many species in the genus Corydoras.

== Taxonomy ==
The family derives its name from the Greek words kalli- (καλλι-, 'beautiful') and ichthys (ἰχθύς, 'fish'). Callichthyidae is one of six families in the superfamily Loricarioidea, and is sister to a clade formed by Scoloplacidae, Astroblepidae, and Loricariidae. Within the family Callichthyidae, the two subfamilies have eight genera and about 177 species, accounting for about 7% of all catfish. Most of these species are in the genus Corydoras, the largest catfish genus.

=== Subdivisions ===
Callichthyidae is divided into two subfamilues and the following genera:

- Subfamily Callichthyinae Bonaparte 1835
  - Callichthys Scopoli 1777
  - Dianema Cope, 1871
  - Hoplosternum Gill, 1858
  - Lepthoplosternum R. Reis, 1997
  - Megalechis R. Reis, 1997
- Subfamily Corydoradinae Hoedeman, 1952
  - Aspidoras Ihering, 1907
  - Brochis Cope, 1871
  - Corydoras Lacépède, 1803
  - Gastrodermus Cope, 1878
  - Hoplisoma Swainson, 1838
  - Osteogaster Cope, 1894
  - Scleromystax Günther, 1864

The subfamily Corydoradinae includes about 90% of the species in the family Callichthyidae and is one of the most diverse siluriform assemblages in the Neotropics, with about 170 valid species.

The following cladogram shows the position of the genera within the subfamily Corydoradinae, as well as the clade possessing venom glands on their pectoral spines:

- Corydoradinae
  - Corydoras
  - - - Aspidoras
      - Scleromystax
    - - Gastrodermus
      - Venom glands
        - Hoplisoma
        - - Brochis
          - Osteogaster

The subfamily Callichthyinae contains Callichthys, Dianema, Hoplosternum, Lepthoplosternum, and Megalechis. According to a 1997 paper, Callichthys is the most basal member of the subfamily. In a 2004 study, different relationships among the callichthyines were found: Dianema and Hoplosternum form the most basal clade, and Callichthys is sister to Lepthoplosternum and Megalechis. In a 2013 study, Dianema is the sister group of all the remaining genera.

== Fossil record ==
The first known fossil species of callichthyid is Corydoras revelatus from Salta, Argentina, of the late Paleocene. This species is tentatively placed in Corydoras, but is unambiguously a member of the subfamily Corydoradinae. It indicates that the lineages leading to the two callichthyid subfamilies occurred at least by the late Paleocene. It also suggests an earlier differentiation of loricarioids in comparison to other catfishes, or a lack of older fossils of other Neotropical groups.

A fossil identified as a Hoplosternum species has also been identified from the middle Miocene in the La Venta formation, Magdalena River basin, Colombia.

== Distribution ==
The Neotropical family Callichthyidae is found in most South American river drainages (Paraná-Paraguay, São Francisco, Atlantic Coastal basins in Brazil, Amazon, Orinoco, Maracaibo, Magdalena). Hoplosternum punctatum is the only species in Central America, as it occurs in a few rivers in Panama. Callichthyidae present the highest species richness in the headwaters of the Amazonas drainage and those rivers draining the Guiana Shield.

The subfamily Corydoradinae is found east of the Andes and north of the Rio de La Plata system. Representatives of the Corydoradinae are found in several freshwater environments, ranging from fast-flowing piedmont streams with sandy or rocky bottoms to lowland pools with muddy bottoms. A single species, Aspidoras mephisto, is a cavefish.

== Description ==
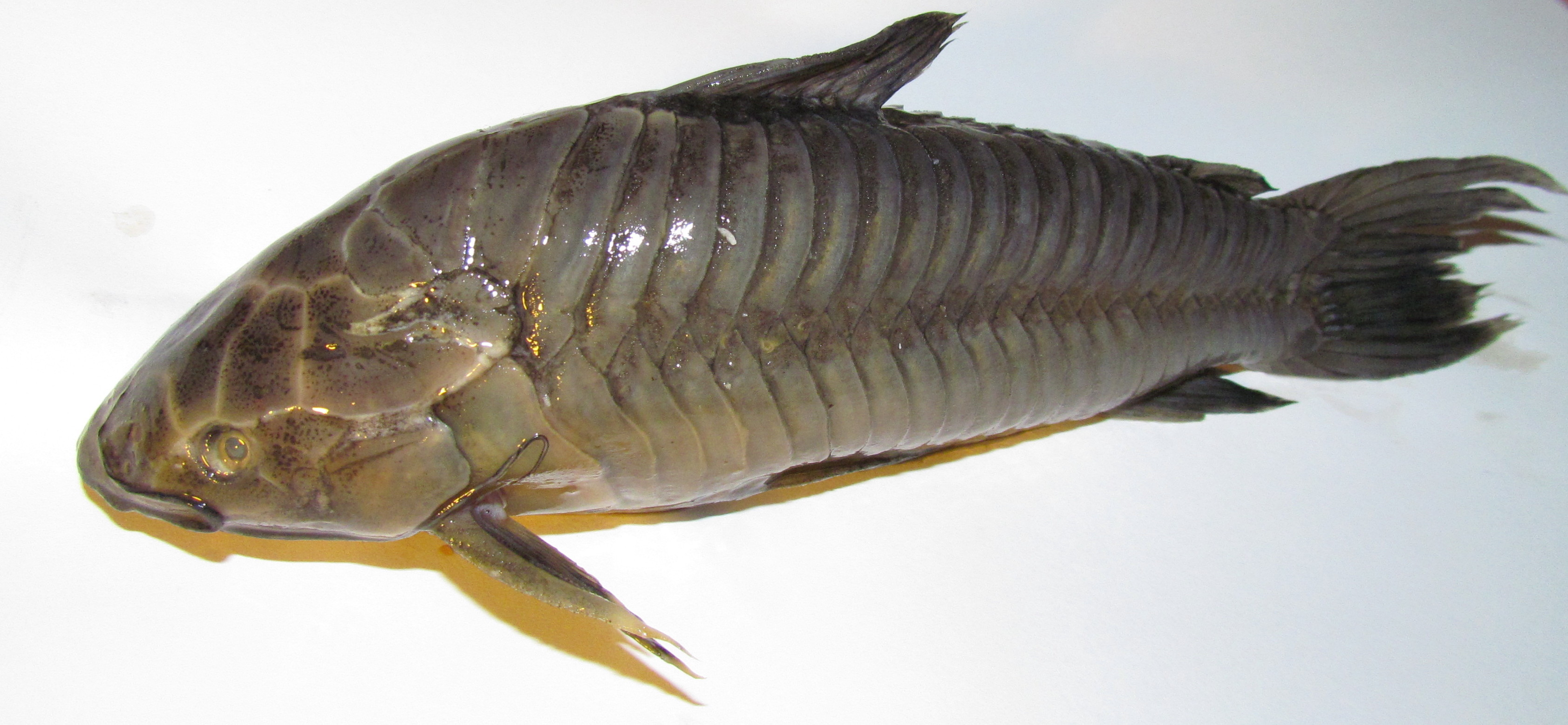
Closeup photograph of Hoplosternum littorale showing overlapping bony plates

Callichthyids are fairly small catfish, and range in size from some tiny Corydoras species that do not exceed 2 cm (0.79 in) to Hoplosternum littorale, which some sources list as growing to a length of up to 24 cm (9.4 in) TL. The mouth is small and ventral with one or two pairs of well-developed barbels. The dorsal and pectoral fins have strong spines, and a spine is found at the anterior border of the adipose fin. In many species of this family, these spines are also venomous as an added deterrent to predators.

The scutes that give these fish their name are one of their most prominent characteristics. The body has two rows of overlapping bony plates on each side. The plates are arranged so they overlap along the rows as well as between the rows, providing protection but also allowing some freedom of movement. These scutes connect with the solid bones of the head, and the head itself may be covered with bony plates. The upper row of lateral scutes may either meet on the back or a narrow bare area may be filled with small oval or roundish bony platelets.

Species of the Corydoradinae are of small size (maximum about 9 cm (3.5 in) in standard length) and are easily distinguished from other callichthyids by their deep bodies and short maxillary barbels.

== Ecology ==
Living habits are varied; the family includes both bottom-foraging and midwater species. Callichthyids inhabit a wide range of habitats, from small, swift, oxygen-rich creeks to big rivers and flooded areas. Their habitats may even include swampy and muddy ones where oxygen may be virtually absent. Callichthyids survive in these conditions by breathing air, collecting and swallowing it at the water's surface. The intestines are used to absorb oxygen, and the air is expelled from the anus. The anterior digestive intestine packages digesta into a string of slightly compressed boluses, creating an air channel in the digestive intestine, thus allowing air to pass unimpeded. The posterior intestine is modified for respiration into a thin-walled and highly vascularized structure by reduction of the thickness of the epithelium, submucosa, and muscle layers; though highly modified to absorb air, it is inefficient for digestive purposes. Air moving through the digestive tract facilitates the movement of digesta to the rectum. Unlike other catfish such as loricariids or trichomycterids that may breathe air only under hypoxic conditions, callichthyids breathe air under all water conditions. Some callichthyids are able to absorb air through their hind guts to move short distances on land. Air stored in their digestive tracts also accounts for 75% of the necessary air for neutral buoyancy.

Some corydoradines possess venom glands, and it is thought that the similar coloration in multiple species may be a complex system of mimicry (involving Müllerian, quasi-Batesian, and Batesian mimics) across multiple genera.

Breeding habits are also variable. Corydoradines breed over the substrate (such as rocks, logs, or leaves) as most catfish. However, the members of the subfamily Callichthyinae are known for building and guarding floating foam bubble nests; Hoplosternum littorale is reported to have the most complex nest structure. These floating nests are made of foam and plant debris. Spawning and caring for the eggs and larvae takes place in these nests. Parental care in callichthyines is by the male. In Corydoras and Hoplosternum, fertilization of eggs involves 'sperm drinking'; the female and male form the "T-position" with the female's mouth over the male's genital opening, and then the female drinks the sperm, releasing the sperm and eggs simultaneously.

== Relationship to humans ==
Some species are quite common in South America and are fished commercially. They are usually cooked in their bony armor. Some callichthyids, especially species of Corydoras, are popular as ornamental fish in the fishkeeping hobby.
