= List of aquarium fish by scientific name =

This article lists fish commonly kept in aquariums and ponds.

== Anguilliformes ==
=== Muraenidae ===
==== Echidna (fish) ====
- Echidna nebulosa
- Echidna polyzona

==== Muraena ====
- Muraena lentiginosa

==== Rhinomuraena ====
- Rhinomuraena amboinensis

== Atheriniformes ==
=== Atherinidae ===
==== Bedotia ====
- Bedotia geayi

==== Brachygobius ====
- Brachygobius doriae

==== Telmatherina ====
- Telmatherina ladigesi

=== Melanotaeniidae ===
==== Glossolepis ====
- Glossolepis incisus

==== Iriatherina ====
- Iriatherina werneri

==== Melanotaenia ====
- Melanotaenia boesemani
- Melanotaenia fluviatilis
- Melanotaenia herbertaxelrodi
- Melanotaenia lacustris
- Melanotaenia maccullochi
- Melanotaenia splendida

== Beloniformes ==
=== Adrianichthyidae ===
==== Oryzias ====
- Oryzias melastigma

=== Belonidae ===
==== Xenentodon ====
- Xenentodon cancila

=== Hemiramphidae ===
==== Dermogenys ====
- Dermogenys pusillus

== Beryciformes ==
=== Holocentridae ===
==== Holocentrus ====
- Holocentrus diadema

==== Myripristis ====
- Myripristis murdjan

== Characiformes ==
=== Alestidae ===
==== Lepidarchus ====
- Lepidarchus adonis

==== Phenacogrammus ====
- Phenacogrammus interruptus

=== Anostomidae ===
==== Abramites ====
- Abramites hypselonotus

==== Anostomus ====
- Anostomus anostomus
- Anostomus ternetzi

==== Leporinus ====
- Leporinus desmotes
- Leporinus frederici
- Leporinus octofasciatum
- Leporinus arcus

=== Chalceidae ===
==== Chalceus ====
- Chalceus macrolepidotus

=== Characidae ===
==== Aphyocharax ====
- Aphyocharax anisitsi

==== Arnoldichthys ====
- Arnoldichthys spilopterus

==== Astyanax ====
- Astyanax mexicanus

==== Boehlkea ====
- Boehlkea fredcochui

==== Brachychalcinus ====
- Brachychalcinus orbicularis

==== Exodon ====
- Exodon paradoxus

==== Gnathocharax ====
- Gnathocharax steindachneri

==== Gymnocorymbus ====
- Gymnocorymbus ternetzi

==== Hasemania ====
- Hasemania nana

==== Hemigrammus ====
- Hemigrammus erythrozonus
- Hemigrammus ocellifer
- Hemigrammus pulcher
- Hemigrammus rhodostomus

==== Hyphessobrycon ====
- Hyphessobrycon anisitsi
- Hyphessobrycon bifasciatus
- Hyphessobrycon columbianus
- Hyphessobrycon erythrostigma
- Hyphessobrycon eques
- Hyphessobrycon flammeus
- Hyphessobrycon herbertaxelrodi
- Hyphessobrycon heterorhabdus
- Hyphessobrycon megalopterus
- Hyphessobrycon pulchripinnis
- Hyphessobrycon rosaceus
- Hyphessobrycon sweglesi

==== Knodus ====
- Knodus borki

==== Moenkhausia ====
- Moenkhausia oligolepis
- Moenkhausia pittieri
- Moenkhausia sanctaefilomenae

==== Nematobrycon ====
- Nematobrycon palmeri

==== Paracheirodon ====
- Paracheirodon axelrodi
- Paracheirodon innesi

==== Prionobrama ====
- Prionobrama filigera

==== Pristella ====
- Pristella maxillaris

==== Pseudocorynopoma ====
- Pseudocorynopoma doriae

==== Tetragonopterus ====
- Tetragonopterus chalceus

==== Thayeria ====
- Thayeria boehlkei

=== Curimatidae ===
==== Chilodus ====
- Chilodus punctatus

=== Distichodontidae ===
==== Distichodus ====
- Distichodus affinis
- Distichodus lussoso
- Distichodus noboli
- Distichodus sexfasciatus

==== Nannaethiops ====
- Nannaethiops unitaeniatus

=== Gasteropelecidae ===
==== Carnegiella ====
- Carnegiella marthae
- Carnegiella strigata
- Carnegiella myersi

==== Gasteropelecus ====
- Gasteropelecus sternicla
- Grape Scissors Fish

==== Thoracocharax ====
- Thoracocharax stellatus

=== Lebiasinidae ===
==== Copeina ====
- Copeina guttata

==== Copella ====
- Copella arnoldi

==== Nannostomus ====
- Nannostomus beckfordi
- Nannostomus eques
- Nannostomus trifasciatus
- Nannostomus unifasciatus

==== Pyrrhulina ====
- Pyrrhulina beni
- Pyrrhulina filamentosa

=== Serrasalminae ===
==== Colossoma ====
- Colossoma bidens

==== Metynnis ====
- Metynnis hypsauchen

==== Mylossoma ====
- Mylossoma pluriventre

==== Pygocentrus ====
- Pygocentrus nattereri

== Cypriniformes ==
=== Botiidae ===
==== Ambastaia ====
- Ambastaia sidthimunki

==== Botia ====
- Botia almorhae
- Botia striata

==== Chromobotia ====
- Chromobotia macracanthus

==== Yasuhikotakia ====
- Yasuhikotakia modesta
- Yasuhikotakia mortlei

=== Cyprinidae ===
==== Acanthorhodeus ====
- Acanthorhodeus chankaensis

==== Barbus ====
- Barbus oligolepis
- Barbus peloponnesius
- Barbus roloffi
- Barbus walkerie

==== Balantiocheilos ====
- Balantiocheilos melanopterus

==== Boraras ====
- Boraras brigittae
- Boraras maculata
- Boraras merah
- Boraras micros
- Boraras naevus
- Boraras urophthalmoides

==== Carassius ====
- Carassius auratus

==== Crossocheilus ====
- Crossocheilus oblongus

==== Cyprinus ====
- Cyprinus carpio
- Cyprinus rubrofuscus

==== Cyprinella ====
- Cyprinella lutrensis

==== Danio ====
- Danio albolineatus
- Danio kyathit
- Danio kerri
- Danio rerio

==== Devario ====
- Devario aequipinnatus

==== Epalzeorhynchos ====
- Epalzeorhynchos bicolor
- Epalzeorhynchos frenatum

==== Labeo ====
- Labeo chrysophekadion

==== Leptobarbus ====
- Leptobarbus hoevenii

==== Luciosoma ====
- Luciosoma setigerum

==== Osteochilus ====
- Osteochilus vittatus

==== Pethia ====
- Pethia conchonius

==== Phoxinus ====
- Phoxinus phoxinus

==== Pimephales ====
- Pimephales promelas

==== Puntigrus ====
- Puntigrus tetrazona

==== Puntius ====
- Puntius titteya

==== Rasbora ====
- Rasbora borapetensis
- Rasbora caudimaculata
- Rasbora daniconius
- Rasbora einthovenii
- Rasbora elegans
- Rasbora kalochroma
- Rasbora trilineata

==== Rhodeus ====
- Rhodeus ocellatus
- Rhodeus sericeus

==== Sarcocheilichthys ====
- Sarcocheilichthys sinensis

==== Scardinius ====
- Scardinius erythrophthalmus

==== Tanichthys ====
- Tanichthys micagemmae
- Tanichthys albonubes

==== Trigonostigma ====
- Trigonostigma heteromorpha

=== Gyrinocheilidae ===
==== Gyrinocheilus ====
- Gyrinocheilus aymonieri

=== Cobitidae ===
==== Acantopsis ====
- Acantopsis dialuzona

==== Cobitis ====
- Cobitis biwae

==== Misgurnus ====
- Misgurnus anguillicaudatus

==== Pangio ====
- Pangio oblonga
- Pangio kuhlii

=== Catostomidae ===
==== Myxocyprinus ====
- Myxocyprinus asiaticus sinensis

== Cyprinodontiformes ==
=== Cyprinodontidae ===
==== Aphaniops ====
- Aphaniops dispar

==== Aphyosemion ====
- Aphyosemion amieti
- Aphyosemion australe
- Aphyosemion bivittatum
- Aphyosemion gardneri
- Aphyosemion sjoestedti
- Aphyosemion striatum
- Aphyosemion walkeri

==== Aplocheilus ====
- Aplocheilus dayi

==== Cynolebias ====
- Cynolebias bokermani
- Cynolebias nigripinnis

==== Epiplatys ====
- Epiplatys fasciolatus

==== Jordanella ====
- Jordanella floridae

==== Pachypanchax ====
- Pachypanchax playfairii

==== Pseudoepiplatys ====
- Pseudoepiplatys annulatus

=== Poeciliidae ===
==== Alfaro ====
- Alfaro cultratus

==== Brachyrgaphis ====
- Brachyrhaphis roseni

==== Gambusia ====
- Gambusia affinis

==== Heterandria ====
- Heterandria bimaculata
- Heterandria formosa

==== Poecilia ====
- Poecilia nigrofasciata
- Poecilia reticulata
- Poecilia sphenops
- Poecilia latipinna

==== Xiphophorus ====
- Xiphophorus helleri
- Xiphophorus maculatus
- Xiphophorus nezahualcoyotl
- Xiphophorus variatus

=== Goodeidae ===
==== Allotoca ====
- Allotoca dugesi

==== Amecca ====
- Amecca splendens

==== Characodon ====
- Characodon audax

==== Skiffia ====
- Skiffia francesae x multipunctatus

==== Xenotoca ====
- Xenotoca eiseni

== Gasterosteiformes ==
=== Gasterosteidae ===
==== Gasterosteus ====
- Gasterosteus aculeatus

==== Spinachia ====
- Spinachia spinachia

== Lepisosteiformes ==
=== Lepisosteidae ===
==== Lepisosteus ====
- Lepisosteus osseus

== Mugiliformes ==
=== Mugilidae ===
==== Chelon ====
- Chelon labrosus

== Osteoglossiformes ==
=== Mormyridae ===
==== Gnathonemus ====
- Gnathonemus petersi

=== Notopteridae ===
==== Notopterus ====
- Notopterus chitala

=== Pantodontidae ===
==== Pantodon ====
- Pantodon buchholzi

=== Osteoglossidae ===
==== Scleropages ====
- Scleropages jardinii

== Perciformes ==
=== Cichlidae ===
==== Amatitlania ====
- Amatitlania nigrofasciata

==== Anomalachromis ====
- Anomalachromis thomasi

==== Apistogramma ====
- Apistogramma agassizii
- Apistogramma bitaeniata
- Apistogramma cacatuoides
- Apistogramma macmasteri
- Apistogramma nijsseni
- Apistogramma trifasciatum

==== Crenicara ====
- Crenicara filamentosa

==== Dimidiochromis ====
- Dimidiochromis compressiceps

==== Labidochromis ====
- Labidochromis caeruleus

==== Mikrogeophagus ====
- Mikrogeophagus ramirezi

==== Nannacara ====
- Nannacara anomala

==== Nanochromis ====
- Nanochromis nudiceps

==== Papiliochromis ====
- Papiliochromis ramirezi

==== Pelvicachromis ====
- Pelvicachromis pulcher

==== Aequidens ====
- Aequidens maronii
- Aequidens pulcher
- Aequidens rivulatus
- Aequidens curviceps

==== Astronotus ====
- Astronotus ocellatus

==== Cichlasoma ====
- Cichlasoma citrinellum
- Cichlasoma dovii
- Cichlasoma maculicauda
- Cichlasoma cyanoguttatum
- Cichlasoma managuense
- Cichlasoma nigrofasciatum
- Cichlasoma severum
- Cichlasoma festivum

==== Crenicichla ====
- Crenicichla lepidota

==== Etroplus ====
- Etroplus maculatus

==== Geophagus ====
- Geophagus daemon

==== Hemichromis ====
- Hemichromis bimaculatus

==== Rocio ====
- Rocio octofasciata

==== Parapetenia ====
- Parapetenia festae

==== Pterophyllum ====
- Pterophyllum altum
- Pterophyllum scalare

==== Symphysodon ====
- Symphysodon aequifasciatus
- Symphysodon discus
- Symphysodon tarzoo

==== Thorichthys ====
- Thorichthys meeki

==== Tilapia ====
- Tilapia mariae

==== Aulonacara ====
- Aulonacara nyassae

==== Cyprichromis ====
- Cyprichromis leptosoma

==== Cyrtocara ====
- Cyrtocara ahli
- Cyrtocara polystigma

==== Julidochromis ====
- Julidochromis dickfeldi
- Julidochromis marlierie
- Julidochromis transcriptus
- Julidochromis regani

==== Labeotropheus ====
- Labeotropheus fuelleborni

==== Lethrinops ====
- Lethrinops furcifer

==== Melanochromis ====
- Melanochromis auratus
- Melanochromis chipokae
- Melanochromis johanni

==== Neolamprologus ====
- Neolamprologus brichardi
- Neolamprologus leleupi

==== Pseudotropheus ====
- Pseudotropheus elongatus
- Pseudotropheus lombardoi
- Pseudotropheus tropheops
- Pseudotropheus zebra

==== Tropheus ====
- Tropheus moorii

==== Haplochromis ====
- Haplochromis macrostoma

=== Anabantidae ===
==== Anabas ====
- Anabas testudineus

==== Ctenopoma ====
- Ctenopoma acutirostre
- Ctenopoma ansorgei
- Ctenopoma fasciolatum
- Ctenopoma oxyrhynchus

=== Osphronemidae ===
==== Belontia ====
- Belontia signata

==== Betta ====
- Betta bellica
- Betta imbellis
- Betta splendens
- Betta pugnax
- Betta coccina

==== Colisa ====
- Colisa fasciata
- Colisa labiosa
- Colisa lalia

==== Macropodus ====
- Macropodus cupanus

==== Osphronemus ====
- Osphronemus goramy

==== Sphaerichthys ====
- Sphaerichthys osphromenoides

==== Trichogaster ====
- Trichogaster lalius

==== Trichopodus ====
- Trichopodus cantoris
- Trichopodus leerii
- Trichopodus microlepis
- Trichopodus pectoralis
- Trichopodus trichopterus

==== Trichopsis ====
- Trichopsis vittatus

=== Helostomatidae ===
==== Helostoma ====
- Helostoma temminckii

=== Nandidae ===
==== Badis ====
- Badis badis

=== Centropomidae ===
==== Chanda ====
- Chanda ranga

=== Channidae ===
==== Channa ====
- Channa asiatica

=== Lobotidae ===
==== Datnioides ====
- Datnioides microlepis

=== Dario ===
- Dario dario
- Dario tigris
- Dario hysginon

=== Eleotridae ===
==== Hypseleotris ====
- Hypseleotris compressus

=== Nandidae ===
==== Monocirrhus ====
- Monocirrhus polyacanthus

=== Monodactylidae ===
==== Monodactylus ====
- Monodactylus argenteus

=== Scatophagidae ===
==== Scatophagus ====
- Scatophagus argus

=== Gobiidae ===
==== Stigmatogobius ====
- Stigmatogobius sadanundio

==== Brachygobius ====
- Brachygobius doriae

==== Cryptocentrus ====
- Cryptocentrus cinctus

==== Lythrypnus ====
- Lythrypnus dalli

==== Nemateleotris ====
- Nemateleotris decora
- Nemateleotris magnifica

==== Thorogobius ====
- Thorogobius ephippiatus

=== Toxotidae ===
==== Toxotes ====
- Toxotes jaculator

=== Centrarchidae ===
==== Lepomis ====
- Lepomis cyanellus
- Lepomis gibbosus
- Lepomis humilis
- Lepomis macrochirus
- Lepomis punctatus

=== Pomacentridae ===
==== Amphiprion ====
- Amphiprion argenteus
- Amphiprion frenatus
- Amphiprion matejuelo
- Amphiprion ocellaris
- Amphiprion perideraion

==== Premnas ====
- Premnas biaculeatus

=== Pomacanthidae ===
==== Centropyge ====
- Centropyge argi
- Centropyge bicolor
- Centropyge bispinosa
- Centropyge eibli
- Centropyge loricula

==== Euxiphipops ====
- Euxiphipops navarchus

==== Holacanthus ====
- Holacanthus ciliaris
- Holacanthus tricolor
- Holacanthus trimaculatus

==== Pomacanthus ====
- Pomacanthus annularis
- Pomacanthus maculosus
- Pomacanthus imperator
- Pomacanthus paru
- Pomacanthus semicirculatus

==== Pygoplites ====
- Pygoplites diacanthus

=== Chaetodontidae ===
==== Chaetodon ====
- Chaetodon auriga
- Chaetodon lunula
- Chaetodon quadrimaculatus
- Chaetodon unimaculatus
- Chaetodon decussatus

==== Chelmon ====
- Chelmon rostratus

==== Forcipiger ====
- Forcipiger longriostris

==== Heniochus ====
- Heniochus acuminatus

=== Pomacentridae ===
==== Neoglyphidodon ====
- Neoglyphidodon oxyodon

==== Abudefduf ====
- Abudefduf saxatilis

==== Chromis ====
- Chromis cyaneae
- Chromis chromis
- Chromis viridis

==== Chrysiptera ====
- Chrysiptera parasema

==== Dascyllus ====
- Dascyllus aruanus
- Dascyllus carneus
- Dascyllus melanurus
- Dascyllus trimaculatus

==== Microspathodon ====
- Microspathodon chrysurus

==== Pomacentrus ====
- Pomacentrus alleni
- Pomacentrus caeruleus

==== Stegastes ====
- Stegastes planifrons

=== Acanthuridae ===
==== Acanthurus ====
- Acanthurus achilles
- Acanthurus glaucopareius
- Acanthurus leucosternon
- Acanthurus triostegus

==== Ctenochaetus ====
- Ctenochaetus strigosus

==== Naso ====
- Naso literatus

==== Paracanthurus ====
- Paracanthurus hepatus

==== Zebrasoma ====
- Zebrasoma flavescens
- Zebrasoma xanthurum

=== Labridae ===
==== Bodianus ====
- Bodianus rufus
- Bodianus puchellus

==== Coris ====
- Coris aygula
- Coris gaimard

==== Gomphosus ====
- Gomphosus varius

==== Labroides ====
- Labroides phthirophagus
- Labroides dimidiatus

==== Choerodon ====
- Choerodon fasciatus

==== Thalassoma ====
- Thalassoma lunare

==== Centrolabrus ====
- Centrolabrus exoleta
- Centrolabrus melops

==== Labrus ====
- Labrus bergylta

=== Serranidae ===
==== Anthias ====
- Anthias squamipinnis

==== Chromileptes ====
- Chromileptes altivelis

==== Gramma ====
- Gramma loreto

=== Ephippidae ===
==== Platax ====
- Platax orbicularis

=== Apogonidae ===
==== Apogon ====
- Apogon notopterus

==== Pterapogon ====
- Pterapogon kauderni

==== Sphaeramia ====
- Sphaeramia nematoptera

=== Blenniidae ===
==== Escenius ====
- Escenius bicolor

==== Meiacanthus ====
- Meiacanthus smithii

==== Blennius ====
- Blennius gattorugine

==== Lipophrys ====
- Lipophrys pholis

=== Pomadasyidae ===
==== Anisotremus ====
- Anisotremus virginicus

=== Cirrhitidae ===
==== Oxycirrhites ====
- Oxycirrhites typus

=== Opisthognathidae ===
==== Opisthognathus ====
- Opistognathus aurifrons

=== Callionymidae ===
==== Synchiropus ====
- Synchiropus splendidus

=== Siganidae ===
==== Siganus ====
- Siganus vulpinus

=== Haemulidae ===
==== Plectorhynchus ====
- Plectorhinchus chaetodonoides
- Plectorhinchus orientalis

=== Zanclidae ===
==== Zanclus ====
- Zanclus canescens

=== Stichaeidae ===
==== Chirolophis ====
- Chirolophis ascanii

=== Gobiesocidae ===
==== Lepadogaster ====
- Lepadogaster candollei

=== Pholidae ===
==== Pholis ====
- Pholis gunnellus

== Scorpaeniformes ==
=== Scorpaenidae ===
==== Pterois ====
- Pterois radiata
- Pterois volitans

==== Scorpaena ====
- Scorpaena species

=== Triglidae ===
==== Enophrys ====
- Enophrys bubalis

=== Agonidae ===
==== Agonus ====
- Agonus cataphractus

=== Cyclopteridae ===
==== Cyclopterus ====
- Cyclopterus lumpus

== Siluriformes ==
=== Doradidae ===
==== Acanthodoras ====
- Acanthodoras spinosissimus

==== Agamyxis ====
- Agamyxis pectinifrons

==== Amblydoras ====
- Amblydoras hancocki

=== Loricariidae ===
==== Acanthicus ====
- Acanthicus adonis

==== Ancistrus ====
- Ancistrus dolichopterus
- Ancistrus temmincki

==== Farlowella ====
- Farlowella acus

==== Hypostomus ====
- Hypostomus multiradiatus
- Hypostomus plecostomus

==== Otocinclus ====
- Otocinclus affinis
- Otocinclus cocama
- Otocinclus macrospilus

==== Panaque ====
- Panaque suttoni

==== Peckoltia ====
- Peckoltia pulcher

==== Pseudorinelepis ====
- Pseudorinelepis genibarbis

==== Pterygoplichthys ====
- Pterygoplichthys gibbiceps
- Pterygoplichthys pardalis

==== Rineloricaria ====
- Rineloricaria species

==== Scobinancistrus ====
- Scobinancistrus aureatus

=== Auchenipteridae ===
==== Auchenipterichthys ====
- Auchenipterichthys coracoideus
- Auchenipterichthys thoracatus

=== Aspredinidae ===
==== Bunocephalus ====
- Bunocephalus coracoideus
- Bunocephalus kneri

=== Callichthyidae ===
==== Aspidoras ====
- Aspidoras fuscoguttatus
- Aspidoras lakoi
- Aspidoras pauciradiatus
- Aspidoras rochai

==== Brochis ====
- Brochis britskii
- Brochis multiradiatus
- Brochis splendens

==== Callichthys ====
- Callichthys callichthys

==== Corydoras ====
- Corydoras acutus
- Corydoras adolfoi
- Corydoras aeneus
- Corydoras agassizii
- Corydoras ambiacus
- Corydoras atropersonatus
- Corydoras axelrodi
- Corydoras barbatus
- Corydoras bondi
- Corydoras caudimaculatus
- Corydoras cochui
- Corydoras delphax
- Corydoras ehrhardti
- Corydoras elegans
- Corydoras eques
- Corydoras evelynae
- Corydoras geoffroy
- Corydoras granti
- Corydoras guapore
- Corydoras habrosus
- Corydoras haraldshultzi
- Corydoras hastatus
- Corydoras julii
- Corydoras latus
- Corydoras leucomelas
- Corydoras loxozonus
- Corydoras melanistius
- Corydoras melanotaenia
- Corydoras metae
- Corydoras nanus
- Corydoras napoensis
- Corydoras narcissus
- Corydoras nattereri
- Corydoras ornatus
- Corydoras osteocarus
- Corydoras paleatus
- Corydoras panda
- Corydoras pastazensis
- Corydoras polystictus
- Corydoras pygmaeus
- Corydoras rabauti
- Corydoras reticulatus
- Corydoras robineae
- Corydoras schwartzi
- Corydoras semiaquilus
- Corydoras septentrionalis
- Corydoras simulatus
- Corydoras sodalis
- Corydoras sterbai
- Corydoras sychri
- Corydoras trilineatus
- Corydoras undulatus
- Corydoras xinguensis

==== Dianema ====
- Dianema longibarbis
- Dianema urostriatum

==== Hoplosternum ====
- Hoplosternum thoracatum

==== Megalechis ====
- Megalechis thoracata

==== Scleromystax ====
- Scleromystax barbatus
- Scleromystax macropterus
- Scleromystax prionotos

=== Claroteidae ===
==== Auchenoglanis ====
- Auchenoglanis occidentalis

==== Chrysichthys ====
- Chrysichthys ornatus

==== Leiocassis ====
- Leiocassis siamensis

==== Mystus ====
- Mystus bimaculatus
- Mystus leucophasis
- Mystus tengara

=== Clariidae ===
==== Channallabes ====
- Channallabes apus

==== Clarias ====
- Clarias batrachus

=== Schilbeidae ===
==== Pareutropius ====
- Pareutropius buffei
- Pareutropius debauwi

=== Siluridae ===
==== Kryptopterus ====
- Kryptopterus bicirrhis
- Kryptopterus macrocephalus
- Kryptopterus vitreolus

=== Pimelodidae ===
==== Aguarunichthys ====
- Aguarunichthys torosus

==== Brachyplatystoma ====
- Brachyplatystoma juruense
- Brachyplatystoma tigrinum

==== Calophysus ====
- Calophysus macropterus

==== Leiarius ====
- Leiarius marmoratus
- Leiarius pictus

==== Phractocephalus ====
- Phractocephalus hemioliopterus

==== Pimelodus ====
- Pimelodus ornatus
- Pimelodus pictus

==== Platystomatichthys ====
- Platystomatichthys sturio

==== Pseudopimelodus ====
- Pseudopimelodus raninus raninus

==== Pseudoplatystoma ====
- Pseudoplatystoma fasciata
- Pseudoplatystoma tigrinum

==== Sorubim ====
- Sorubim lima

==== Sorubimichthys ====
- Sorubimichthys planiceps

=== Malapteruridae ===
==== Malapterurus ====
- Malapterurus electricus

=== Mochokidae ===
==== Synodontis ====
- Synodontis angelicus
- Synodontis brichardi
- Synodontis contractus
- Synodontis decorus
- Synodontis eupterus
- Synodontis flavitaeniatus
- Synodontis multipunctatus
- Synodontis nigriventris
- Synodontis njassae
- Synodontis petricola
- Synodontis schoutedeni

== Synbranchiformes ==
=== Mastacembelidae ===
==== Mastacembelus ====
- Mastacembelus armatus
- Mastacembelus circumcinctus
- Mastacembelus erythrotaenia

== Syngnathiformes ==
=== Syngnathidae ===
==== Dunckerocampus ====
- Dunckerocampus dactyliophorus

==== Syngnathoides ====
- Syngnathoides biaculeatus

==== Hippocampus ====
- Hippocampus kuda
- Hippocampus erectus

=== Centriscidae ===
==== Aeoliscus ====
- Aeoliscus strigatus

== Tetraodontiformes ==
=== Balistidae ===
==== Balistoides ====
- Balistoides conspicillum

==== Balistes ====
- Balistes vetula

==== Odonus ====
- Odonus niger

==== Pseudobalistes ====
- Pseudobalistes fuscus

==== Rhinecanthus ====
- Rhinecanthus aculeatus

=== Ostraciidae ===
==== Lactoria ====
- Lactoria cornuta

==== Ostracion ====
- Ostracion meleagris

=== Monacanthidae ===
==== Chaetoderma ====
- Chaetoderma penicilligera

==== Pervagor ====
- Pervagor melanocephalus

=== Diodontidae ===
==== Diodon ====
- Diodon holocanthus

=== Tetraodontidae ===
==== Canthigaster ====
- Canthigaster margaritata
- Canthigaster valentini
