= Leopard cory =

Leopard cory refers to two species of fish in the Corydoras genus:

- Corydoras leopardus
- Corydoras trilineatus
