= Mosaic corydoras =

Mosaic corydoras is a common name shared by two similar but distinct members of the fish genus Corydoras:

- Corydoras haraldschultzi, known by the common names mosaic corydoras and reticulated corydoras
- Corydoras reticulatus, known by the common names mosaic corydoras, reticulated corydoras, network corydoras, and network catfish
