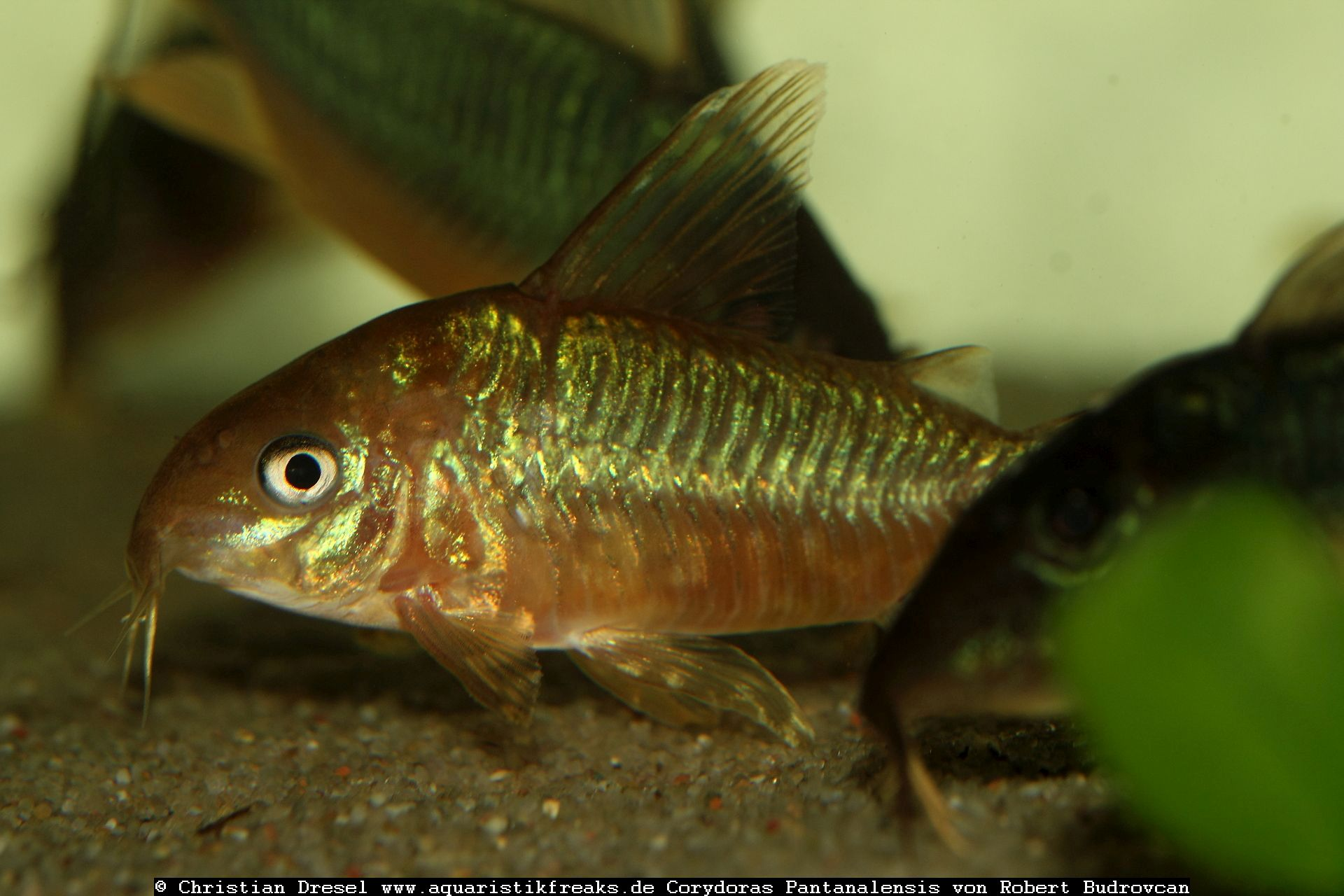

Conservation status
- Least Concern (IUCN 3.1)

Scientific classification
- Kingdom: Animalia
- Phylum: Chordata
- Class: Actinopterygii
- Order: Siluriformes
- Family: Callichthyidae
- Genus: Brochis
- Species: B. pantanalensis

Binomial name
- Brochis pantanalensis (Knaack, 2001)

Synonyms
- Corydoras pantanalensis Knaack, 2001

= Brochis pantanalensis =

Species of fish

Brochis pantanalensis is a species of freshwater ray-finned fish belonging the family Callichthyidae, the armored catfishes, and the subfamily Corydoradinae, the corys. This fish is found in the Cusis and Las Petas River basins, in the Paraguay River system in Bolivia and in the Miranda River in Mato Grosso do Sul in Brazil.
