= False network catfish =

Conservation status
- Least Concern (IUCN 3.1)

Scientific classification
- Kingdom: Animalia
- Phylum: Chordata
- Class: Actinopterygii
- Order: Siluriformes
- Family: Callichthyidae
- Genus: Brochis
- Species: B. sodalis

Binomial name
- Brochis sodalis (Nijssen & Isbrücker, 1986)

Synonyms
- Corydoras sodalis Nijssen & Isbrücker, 1986

Species of fish

The false network catfish (Brochis sodalis) is a species of freshwater ray-finned fish belonging the family Callichthyidae, the armored catfishes, and the subfamily Corydoradinae, the corys. This catfish is found in the Amazon River in Loreto, Peru, and Amazonas, Brazil.

The fish will grow up to 1.9 in (4.8 cm) long. It lives in a tropical climate in water with a 6.0–8.0 pH, a water hardness of 2 – 25 dGH, and a temperature range of 72–79 °F (22–26 °C). It feeds on worms, benthic crustaceans, insects, and plant matter. It lays eggs in dense vegetation and adults do not guard the eggs.

== See also ==
- List of freshwater aquarium fish species
