= Slender catfish =

Slender catfish may refer to two different species of fish:

- Slender catfish, an alternative name for the porthole catfish (Dianema longibarbis), a species of fish found in the Amazon River basin of Brazil and Peru
- Slender catfish (Silurus microdorsalis), a species of fish found in the Yalu River in Korea and China
