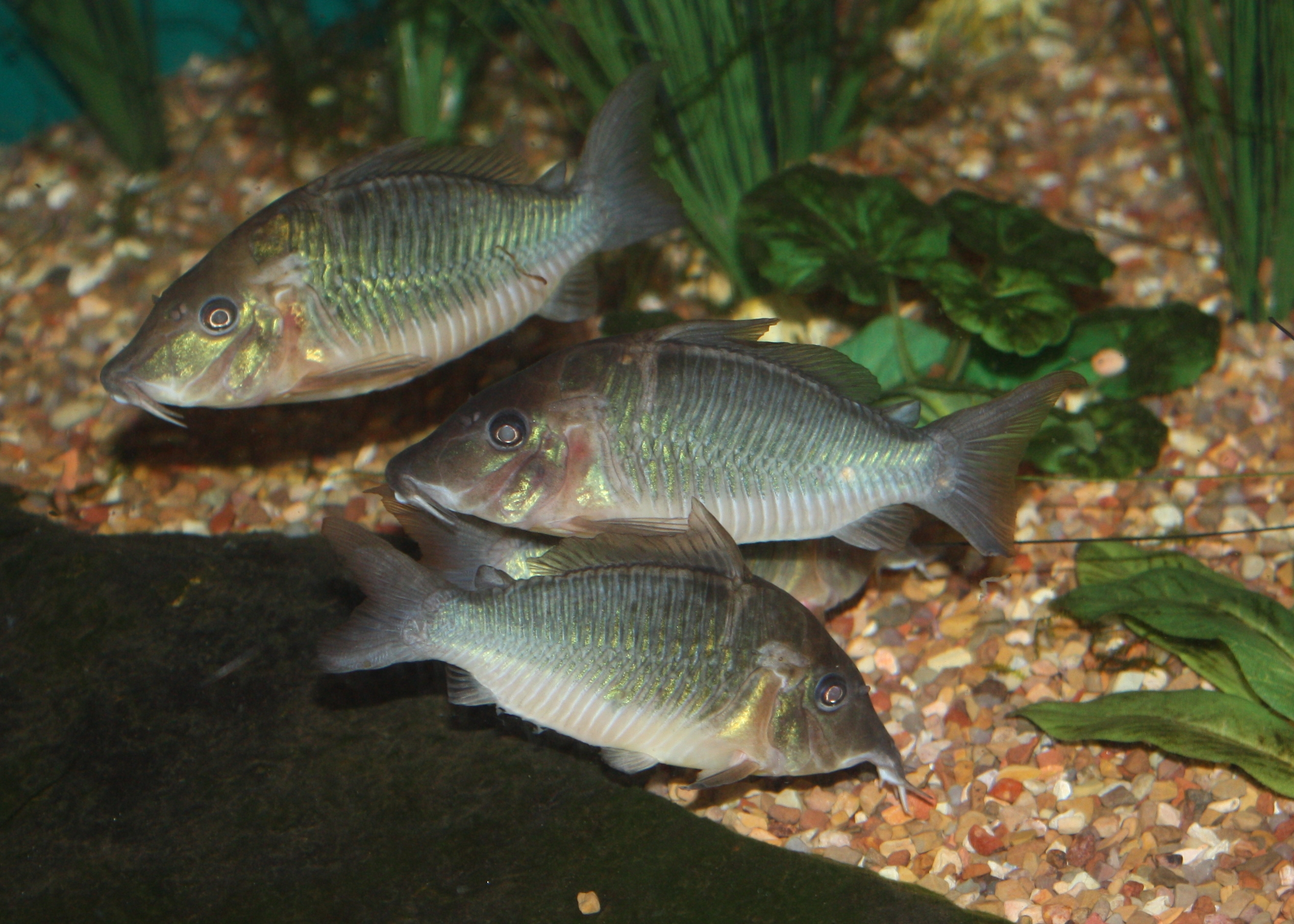

Conservation status
- Least Concern (IUCN 3.1)

Scientific classification
- Kingdom: Animalia
- Phylum: Chordata
- Class: Actinopterygii
- Order: Siluriformes
- Family: Callichthyidae
- Genus: Brochis
- Species: B. multiradiata

Binomial name
- Brochis multiradiata (Orcés-V. (es), 1960)

Synonyms
- Chaenothorax multiradiatus Orcés V., 1960; Corydoras multiradiatus (Orcés V. 1960)

= Hog-nosed catfish =

Species of fish

The hog-nosed catfish (Brochis multiradiata) is a species of freshwater ray-finned fish belonging to the family Callichthyidae, the armored catfishes, and the subfamily Corydoradinae, the corys. This fish is found in South America in the western Amazon basin in Ecuador and Peru. This species is traditionally placed in Corydoras. FishBase continues to recognize this species under Corydoras.

The fish has about 17 dorsal fin rays, compared with the 11 or 12 commonly seen in Brochis splendens. The snout is considerably longer than other species in the genus, which explains the common name. The fish will grow in length up to 6.7 centimetres (2.6 in).

The hog-nosed catfish lives in a tropical climate in water with a 6.0–7.2 pH, a water hardness of 15 dGH, and a temperature range of 21–24 °C (70–75 °F). It feeds on worms, benthic crustaceans, insects, and plant matter.

The hog-nosed catfish likely spawns in a similar fashion to Corydoras. It lays eggs in dense vegetation, and adults do not guard the eggs.

The hog-nosed catfish is of commercial importance in the aquarium trade industry, although it is relatively rare or confused with B. splendens. Care is virtually identical to B. splendens.

== See also ==
- List of freshwater aquarium fish species
