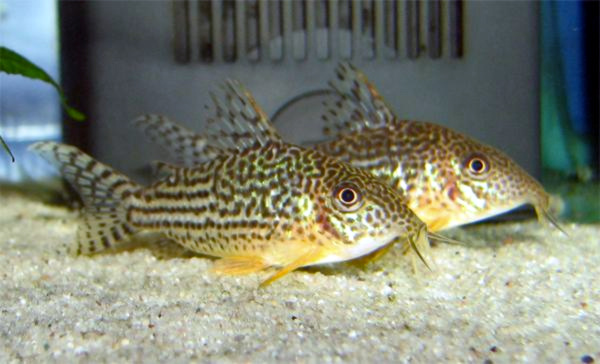

Conservation status
- Least Concern (IUCN 3.1)

Scientific classification
- Kingdom: Animalia
- Phylum: Chordata
- Class: Actinopterygii
- Order: Siluriformes
- Family: Callichthyidae
- Genus: Brochis
- Species: B. haraldschultzi

Binomial name
- Brochis haraldschultzi (Knaack, 1962)

Synonyms
- Corydoras haraldschultzi Knaack, 1962

= Brochis haraldschultzi =

Species of fish

Brochis haraldschultzi, the mosaic cory,, mosaic corydoras or reticulated corydoras, is a tropical freshwater ray-finned fish belonging to the subfamily Corydoradinae, the corys, of the family Callichthyidae, the armoured catfishes. It is found in Brazil and Bolivia.

The fish will grow to 7 centimetres (2.8 in). It lives in a tropical climate in water with a 6.0 – 8.0 pH, a water hardness of 2 – 25 dGH, and a temperature range of 75–83 °F (24–28 °C). It feeds on worms, benthic crustaceans, insects, and plant matter. It lays eggs in dense vegetation and adults do not guard the eggs. During each spawning in captivity, eggs are dropped by the female into her ventral fin pouch which are then taken by the female and placed at a previously cleaned site where they adhere to the substrate. Eggs, 2 mm in diameter, are laid mainly on the underside of fern leaves in close proximity to each other.

Brochis haraldschultzi is of commercial importance in the aquarium trade industry. It is occasionally confused with Hoplisoma sterbai: the difference is that Brochis haraldschultzi has a pattern of black dots on a gold background on the head, whereas H. sterbai has a pattern of gold dots on a black background.

The fish is named in honor of ethnographer and fish collector Harald Schultz who collected the holotype.

== See also ==
- List of freshwater aquarium fish species
