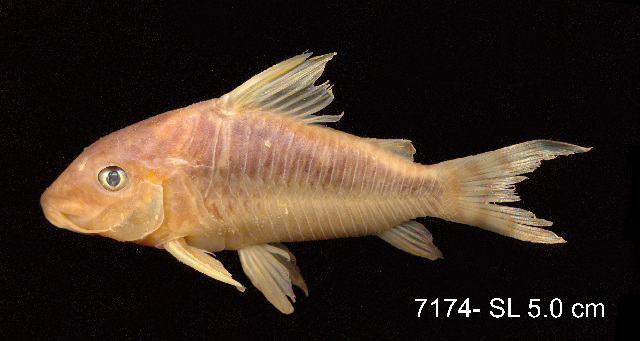

Conservation status
- Least Concern (IUCN 3.1)

Scientific classification
- Kingdom: Animalia
- Phylum: Chordata
- Class: Actinopterygii
- Order: Siluriformes
- Family: Callichthyidae
- Genus: Brochis
- Species: B. seussi

Binomial name
- Brochis seussi (Dinkelmeyer, 1996)

Synonyms
- Corydoras seussi Dinkelmeyer, 1996

= Brochis seussi =

Species of fish

Brochis seussi is a species of freshwater ray-finned fish belonging the family Callichthyidae, the armored catfishes, and the subfamily Corydoradinae, the corys. This species is found in the basin of the Mamoré River in Brazil and Bolivia. It was named after German ichthyologist Dr Werner Seuss. It quite strongly resembles Hoplisoma gossei. However, it can be differentiated by its longer snout; nonetheless, it is not a 'true' longnose corydoras in the manner of, for example, Corydoras septentrionalis. The captive spawning of this catfish has not been documented.
