= Brochis noelkempffi =

Conservation status
- Data Deficient (IUCN 3.1)

Scientific classification
- Kingdom: Animalia
- Phylum: Chordata
- Class: Actinopterygii
- Order: Siluriformes
- Family: Callichthyidae
- Genus: Brochis
- Species: B. noelkempffi

Binomial name
- Brochis noelkempffi (Knaack, 2004)

Synonyms
- Corydoras noelkempffi Knaack, 2004

Species of fish

Brochis noelkempffi, the meander cory, is a species of freshwater ray-finned fish belonging the family Callichthyidae, the armored catfishes, and the subfamily Corydoradinae, the corys. This species is found in Bolivia.

The fish is named in honor of conservation biologist Noel Kempff Mercado, for his efforts to protect 750,000 hectares (2,900 mi^{2}) of biologically rich and geologically significant land in Bolivia, which led to his murder by drug traffickers in 1986. In 1988, the land became Noel Kempff Mercado National Park.
