= Brochis ornata =

Conservation status
- Least Concern (IUCN 3.1)

Scientific classification
- Kingdom: Animalia
- Phylum: Chordata
- Class: Actinopterygii
- Order: Siluriformes
- Family: Callichthyidae
- Genus: Brochis
- Species: B. ornata

Binomial name
- Brochis ornata (Nijssen & Isbrücker, 1976)

Synonyms
- Corydoras ornatus Nijssen & Isbrücker, 1976

Species of fish

Brochis ornata, the ornate corydoras, is a species of freshwater ray-finned fish belonging the family Callichthyidae, the armored catfishes, and the subfamily Corydoradinae, the corys. This species is found in South America where its range includes the Lower Tapajós River and Trombetas River basin in Brazil.

The fish will grow in length up to 1.9 inches (4.8 centimeters). It lives in a tropical climate in water with a pH of 6.0 – 8.0, a water hardness of 2 – 25 dGH, and a temperature range of 74–79 °F (23–26 °C). It feeds on worms, benthic crustaceans, insects, and plant matter. It lays eggs in dense vegetation and adults do not guard the eggs. The female holds 2–4 eggs between her pelvic fins, where the male fertilizes them for about 30 seconds. Only then does the female swim to a suitable spot, where she attaches the very sticky eggs. The pair repeats this process until about 100 eggs have been fertilized and attached.

Brochis ornata is of commercial importance in the aquarium trade industry.

== See also ==
- List of freshwater aquarium fish species
