= Brochis spectabilis =

Conservation status
- Data Deficient (IUCN 3.1)

Scientific classification
- Kingdom: Animalia
- Phylum: Chordata
- Class: Actinopterygii
- Order: Siluriformes
- Family: Callichthyidae
- Genus: Brochis
- Species: B. spectabilis

Binomial name
- Brochis spectabilis Knaack, 1999

Synonyms
- Corydoras spectabilis Knaack, 1999

Species of fish

Brochis spectabilis is a species of freshwater ray-finned fish belonging the family Callichthyidae, the armored catfishes, and the subfamily Corydoradinae, the corys. This species is found in the Guaporé River basin in Brazil.
