= Brochis isbrueckeri =

Conservation status
- Data Deficient (IUCN 3.1)

Scientific classification
- Kingdom: Animalia
- Phylum: Chordata
- Class: Actinopterygii
- Order: Siluriformes
- Family: Callichthyidae
- Genus: Brochis
- Species: B. isbrueckeri

Binomial name
- Brochis isbrueckeri (Knaack, 2004)

Synonyms
- Corydoras isbrueckeri Knaack, 2004

Species of fish

Brochis isbrueckeri is a species of freshwater ray-finned fish belonging the family Callichthyidae, the armored catfishes, and the subfamily Corydoradinae, the corys. This species is found in South America where it is known only from Itenez River basin in Bolivia.

The fish is named in honor of Isaäc J. H. Isbrücker (b. 1944), in honor of his 60th birthday, for building and maintaining the fish collection at Zoölogisch Museums Amsterdam, and for his many publications on the taxonomy of catfishes in the families Callichthyidae and Loricariidae.
