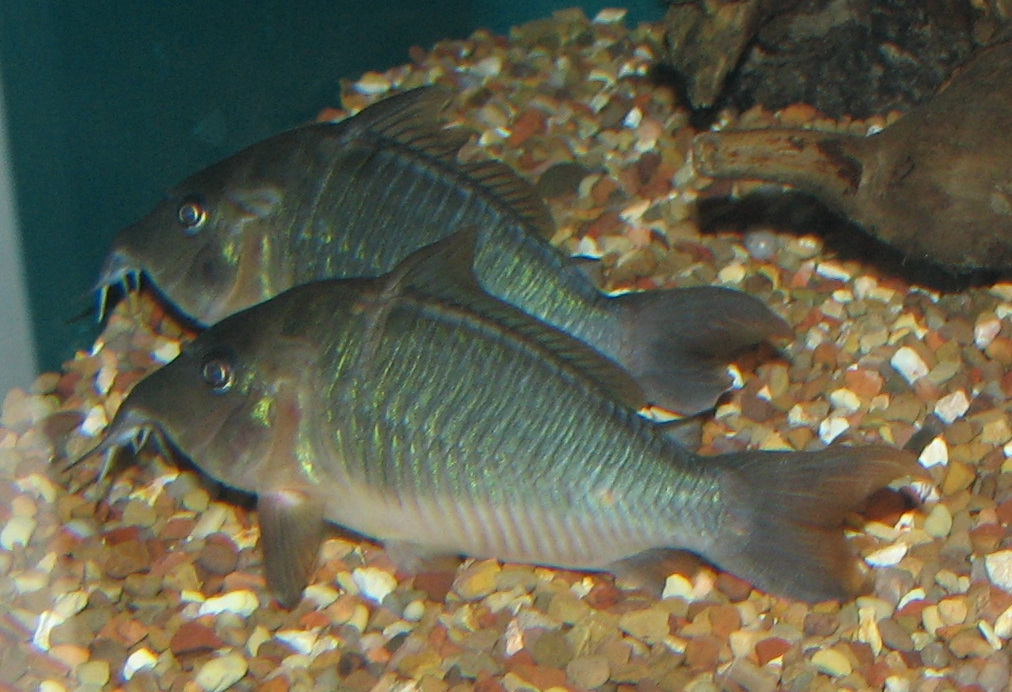
- Brochis multiradiatus

Scientific classification
- Kingdom: Animalia
- Phylum: Chordata
- Class: Actinopterygii
- Division: Teleostei
- Order: Siluriformes
- Family: Callichthyidae
- Subfamily: Corydoradinae
- Genus: Brochis; Cope, 1871

Type species
- Callichthys splendens Castelnau, 1855

Species
- See text

Synonyms
- Chaenothorax Cope, 1878

= Brochis =

Genus of fishes

Brochis is a genus of freshwater ray-finned fish belonging to the family Callichthyidae, the armoured catfishes, and the subfamily Corydoradinae, the corys. Before the recent resurrection of the genus, these species were grouped in the genus Corydoras. The catfishes in this genus are found in South America.

== Taxonomy ==
Brochis was erected by Edward Drinker Cope on 1871. Before 2024, it was in a limbo and considered defunct by most scientific authorities, being considered as a junior synonym or subgenus of Corydoras. It was formally resurrected and revalidated in a phylogenomic analysis carried out in 2024. B. difluviatilis is recognized as the basalmost species of Corydoradini, exhibiting several plesiomorphic features compared to the other species of Corydoras.

== Etymology ==
The generic name, Brochis, is derived from the Greek βρόχος meaning "loop", referring to the diagnostic arrangement of the barbels around the mouth.

== Morphology ==
There are several morphological features that validate the usage of Brochis as a genus, such as a more lyre-like tail, and more decisively, the extended dorsal fins that have more rays than those of Corydoras. Corydoras have 7-10 rays on their dorsal fins, while Brochis have 10–18. The three species traditionally kept in the genus Brochis before its resurrection (B. splendens,B. britskii, and B. multiradiatus) are very large for their family, as several species can breach 8 centimetres (3.1 in) in length. Brochis splendens is the largest, attaining a maximum size of 9.9 centimetres (3.9 in) and 40 g (1.4 oz).

== Species ==
As of August 2025, there are 43 extant species in this genus (as recognized by Eschmeyer's Catalog of Fishes):

- Brochis agassizii (Steindachner, 1876) (Agassiz's or Spotted corydoras)
- Brochis amandajanea (Sands, 1995) (Amanda Jane's cory)
- Brochis ambiacus (Cope, 1872) (Spotted corydoras)
- Brochis approuaguensis (Nijssen & Isbrücker, 1983) (Zebratail cory)
- Brochis arcuata (Elwin, 1938) (Skunk corydoras)
- Brochis bethanae (Bentley, S. Grant & Tencatt, 2021)
- Brochis bifasciata (Nijssen, 1972) (Two-stripe corydoras)
- Brochis britskii Nijssen & Isbrücker, 1983 (Britski's catfish)
- Brochis brittoi (Tencatt & Ohara, 2016)
- Brochis condiscipulus (Nijssen & Isbrücker, 1980) (Schoolmate cory)
- Brochis costai (Ottoni, Barbosa & Katz, 2016)
- Brochis crimmeni (S. Grant, 1997) (Blackwater cory)
- Brochis cryptica Sands, 1995) (Yellow head cory)
- Brochis delphax (Nijssen & Isbrücker, 1983) (False blochi catfish)
- Brochis deweyeri (Meinken, 1957)
- Brochis difluviatilis (Britto & R. M. C. Castro, 2002)
- Brochis ephippifera (Nijssen, 1972) (Saddle corydoras)
- Brochis garbei (R. Ihering, 1911) (Bahia cory)
- Brochis geryi (Nijssen & Isbrücker, 1983) (Bolivian cory)
- Brochis gomezi (D. M. Castro, 1986) (Leticia cory)
- Brochis haraldschultzi (Knaack, 1962) (Mosaic corydoras)
- Brochis heteromorpha (Nijssen, 1970) (White cory)
- Brochis imitator (Nijssen & Isbrücker, 1983) (Imitator cory)
- Brochis incolicana (W. E. Burgess, 1993) (Icana cory)
- Brochis isbrueckeri (Knaack, 2004) (Brazil longnose cory)
- Brochis lamberti (Nijssen & Isbrücker, 1986) (Lambert's cory)
- Brochis leopardus (G. S. Myers, 1933) (Leopard corydoras)
- Brochis multiradiata (Orcés-V. (es), 1960) (Hognosed brochis)
- Brochis noelkempffi (Knaack, 2004) (Meander cory)
- Brochis ornata (Nijssen & Isbrücker, 1976) (Ornate cory)
- Brochis orphnopterus (S. H. Weitzman & Nijssen, 1970)
- Brochis pantanalensis (Knaack, 2001) (Pantanal cory)
- Brochis pinheiroi (Dinkelmeyer, 1995) (Mario's cory)
- Brochis pulchra (Nijssen & Isbrücker, 1973) (Pretty corydoras)
- Brochis reticulata (Fraser-Brunner, 1938) (Reticulated corydoras)
- Brochis robineae (W. E. Burgess, 1983) (Banner-tail corydoras)
- Brochis robusta (Nijssen & Isbrücker, 1980) (Robust cory)
- Brochis seussi (Dinkelmeyer, 1996)
- Brochis sodalis (Nijssen & Isbrücker, 1986) (False network catfish)
- Brochis spectabilis (Knaack, 1999) (Millennium cory)
- Brochis splendens (Castelnau, 1855) (Emerald catfish)
- Brochis sychri (S. H. Weitzman, 1960) (Sychr's catfish)
- Brochis virginiae (W. E. Burgess, 1993) (Miguelito corydoras)
