= Brochis condiscipulus =

Conservation status
- Least Concern (IUCN 3.1)

Scientific classification
- Kingdom: Animalia
- Phylum: Chordata
- Class: Actinopterygii
- Order: Siluriformes
- Family: Callichthyidae
- Genus: Brochis
- Species: B. condiscipulus

Binomial name
- Brochis condiscipulus (Nijssen & Isbrücker, 1980)

Synonyms
- Corydoras condiscipulus (Nijssen & Isbrücker, 1983)

Species of fish

Brochis condiscipulus, the schoolmate cory, is a tropical freshwater ray-finned fish belonging to the subfamily Corydoradinae, the corys, of the family Callichthyidae, the armoured catfishes. This catfish is found in the Oyapock River of French Guiana and Brazil. It is found in the whole river, much of which is blackwater and covered by rainforest. B. condiscipulus grows to a length of 5.1 cm (2.0 in).
