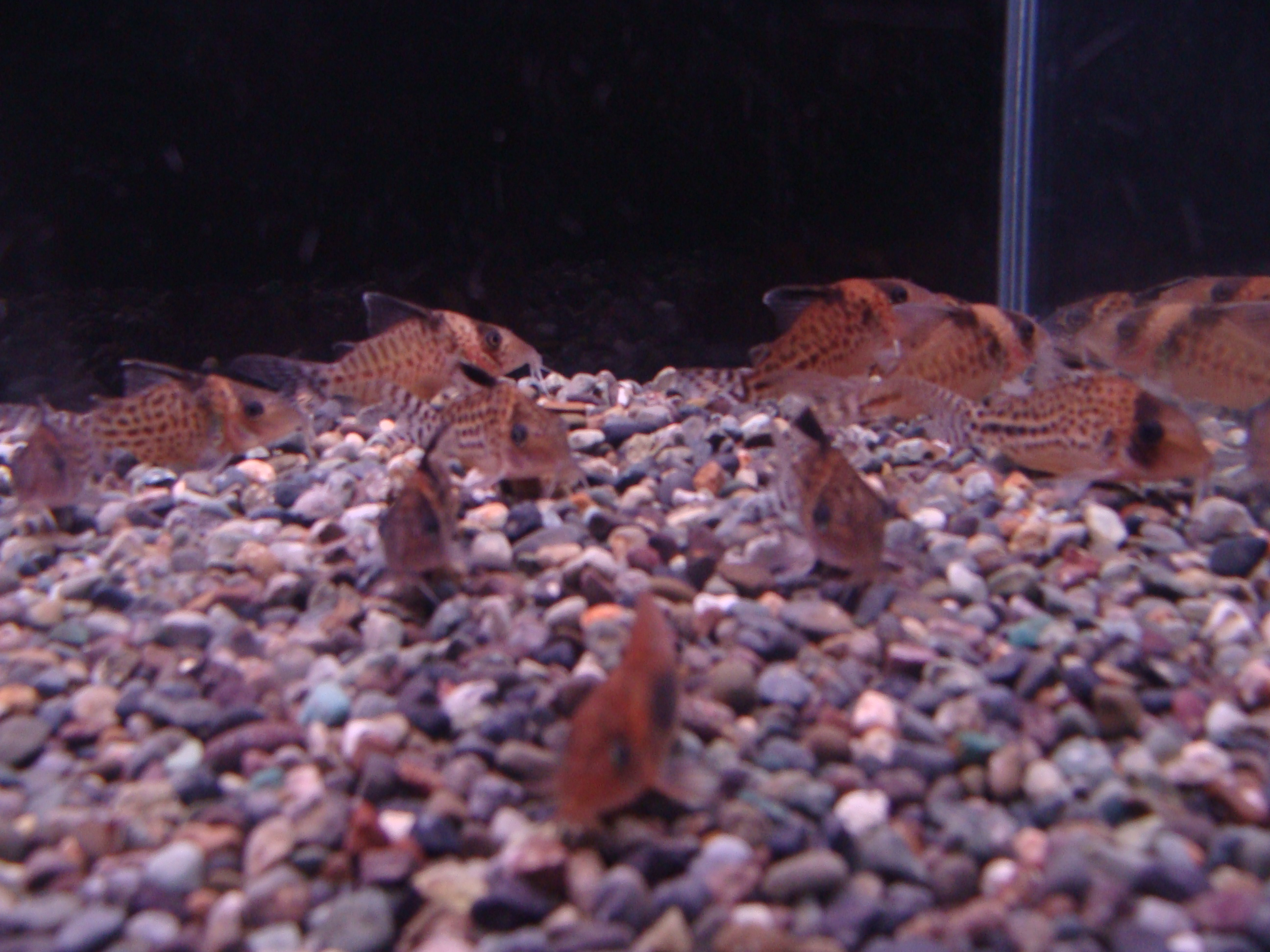

Conservation status
- Least Concern (IUCN 3.1)

Scientific classification
- Kingdom: Animalia
- Phylum: Chordata
- Class: Actinopterygii
- Order: Siluriformes
- Family: Callichthyidae
- Genus: Brochis
- Species: B. ambiacus

Binomial name
- Brochis ambiacus Cope, 1872

Synonyms
- Corydoras ambiacus Cope, 1872; Corydoras grafi Holly, 1940; Corydoras melanistius longirostris Hoedeman, 1953

= Spotted corydoras =

Species of fish

The spotted corydoras (Brochis ambiacus) is a species of freshwater ray-finned fish belonging the family Callichthyidae, the armoured catfishes, and the subfamily Corydoradinae, the corys. It originates in inland waters in South America, and is found in the upper Amazon River basin in Brazil, Colombia and Peru. It is named for the Rio Ampiyacu in Peru, where it was first described.

The fish will grow in length up to 1.9 inches (4.8 centimeters). It lives in a tropical climate in water with a 6.0 – 8.0 pH, a water hardness of 2 – 25 dGH, and a temperature range of 70–75 °F (21–24 °C). It feeds on worms, benthic crustaceans, insects, and plant matter.

The spotted corydoras is of commercial importance in the aquarium trade industry.

== See also ==
- List of freshwater aquarium fish species
