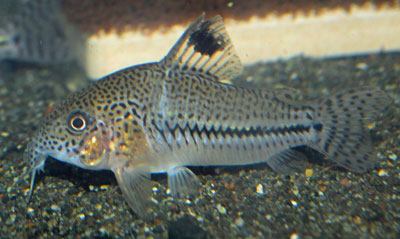

Conservation status
- Least Concern (IUCN 3.1)

Scientific classification
- Kingdom: Animalia
- Phylum: Chordata
- Class: Actinopterygii
- Order: Siluriformes
- Family: Callichthyidae
- Genus: Brochis
- Species: B. leopardus

Binomial name
- Brochis leopardus (Myers, 1933)

Synonyms
- Corydoras leopardus Myers, 1933; Corydoras funnelli Fraser-Brunner, 1947

= Brochis leopardus =

Species of fish

Brochis leopardus, the leopard cory, is a species of freshwater ray-finned fish belonging the family Callichthyidae, the armored catfishes, and the subfamily Corydoradinae, the corys. This catfish is very similar to, and often confused with, the three line cory, Hoplisoma trilineatum. The most obvious differences are that B. leopardus has a longer, more pointed snout than H. trilineatum, and B. leopardus grows larger than H. trilineatum.
