= Brochis incolicana =

Conservation status
- Data Deficient (IUCN 3.1)

Scientific classification
- Kingdom: Animalia
- Phylum: Chordata
- Class: Actinopterygii
- Order: Siluriformes
- Family: Callichthyidae
- Genus: Brochis
- Species: B. incolicana

Binomial name
- Brochis incolicana (Burgess, 1993)

Synonyms
- Corydoras incolicana Burgess, 1993

Species of fish

Brochis incolicana, the Icana cory, is a species of freshwater ray-finned fish belonging the family Callichthyidae, the armored catfishes, and the subfamily Corydoradinae, the corys. It is endemic to the Upper Rio Negro basin in Brazil.
