= Synodontis contractus =

Conservation status
- Least Concern (IUCN 3.1)

Scientific classification
- Kingdom: Animalia
- Phylum: Chordata
- Class: Actinopterygii
- Order: Siluriformes
- Family: Mochokidae
- Genus: Synodontis
- Species: S. contractus

Binomial name
- Synodontis contractus Vinciguerra, 1928

Species of fish

Synodontis contractus, the bugeye squeaker, is a species of upside-down catfish native to the Congo Basin of the Democratic Republic of the Congo and the Republic of the Congo. This species can be found in the aquarium trade.

== Appearance ==
Synodontis contractus grows to a length of 9.7 centimetres (3.8 in) TL. Its body is rounded, modified torpedo-shaped and appears contracted relative to its height. Head is stocky, but streamlined and features a hardened head cap that attaches at the humeral process just behind the gills. Fins are moderately long relative to body length. The first ray of the dorsal and pectoral fins is a stiffened and serrated spine capable of inflicting wounds. Caudal fin is forked. Its ventrally located mouth is wide and has a plate of fused, cone-shaped teeth in the upper jaw used for rasping. The teeth in the lower jaw are moveable. Two pair of long, stiff barbels extend from either side of the mouth and may have additional branches or nodes. The colour pattern is very similar to the Synodontis nigriventris. The main differences being that this species has a bigger head, broader mouth and far larger eyes.

Synodontis contractus is one of those catfish which can produce squeaking sounds by brushing the base of their pectoral spine against their pectoral girdle.

== In aquarium ==
Suitable water conditions are near-neutral pH (6.2 - 7.6) and temperature in range of 22.0–26.0 °C (71.6–78.8 °F). Bugeye squeakers can be fed with live and frozen food, including some vegetable matter.

This species is best kept in a dimly lit aquarium with a soft bottom substrate and rocks, pieces of driftwood and twisted roots arranged to form hiding places. Broad-leaved plants, such as Anubias or Echinodorus and floating vegetation are also recommended, as the fish like to roost under these.
