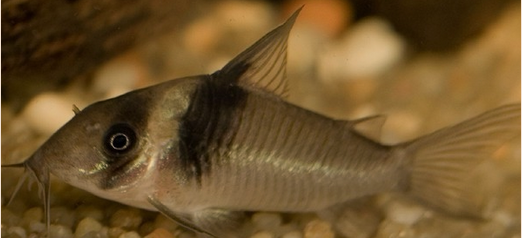

Conservation status
- Least Concern (IUCN 3.1)

Scientific classification
- Kingdom: Animalia
- Phylum: Chordata
- Class: Actinopterygii
- Order: Siluriformes
- Family: Callichthyidae
- Genus: Brochis
- Species: B. virginiae

Binomial name
- Brochis virginiae (Burgess, 1993)

Synonyms
- Corydoras virginiae Burgess, 1993

= Brochis virginiae =

Species of fish

Brochis virginiae, the Miguelito cory, is a species of freshwater ray-finned fish belonging the family Callichthyidae, the armored catfishes, and the subfamily Corydoradinae, the corys. This species is found in Peru.

== Etymology ==
The fish is named in honor of Virginia Schwartz, the wife of aquarium-fish exporter Adolfo Schwartz, who collected the type specimen.
