= Britski's catfish =

Conservation status
- Least Concern (IUCN 3.1)

Scientific classification
- Kingdom: Animalia
- Phylum: Chordata
- Class: Actinopterygii
- Order: Siluriformes
- Family: Callichthyidae
- Genus: Brochis
- Species: B. britskii

Binomial name
- Brochis britskii Nijssen & Isbrücker, 1983

Synonyms
- Corydoras britskii (Nijssen & Isbrücker, 1983)

Species of fish

Britski's catfish (Brochis britskii) is a tropical freshwater ray-finned fish belonging to the subfamily Corydoradinae, the corys, of the family Callichthyidae, the armoured catfishes. It is native to South America, where it is found in the upper Paraguay River basin in Brazil. This species was formerly classified as Corydoras britskii.

The fish has a high number of dorsal fin rays (15–18) when compared with other Corydoras species. It has a shorter snout than C. splendens, has a larger eye, grows to a larger size, and has its head covered ventrally by a large shield extending beyond the tip of the mental barbels. It will grow in length up to 8.8 centimetres (3.5 inches).

It lives in a tropical climate in water with a temperature range of 20–24 °C (68–75 °F). It feeds on worms, benthic crustaceans, insects, and plant matter. It lays eggs in dense vegetation, and the adults do not guard the eggs.

== Etymology ==
The fish is named in honor of Heraldo A. Britski, the curator of fishes at the Museu de Zoologia da Universidade de São Paulo (Brazil), who brought the species to the describers' attention and allowed them to scientifically describe it.

== See also ==
- List of freshwater aquarium fish species
