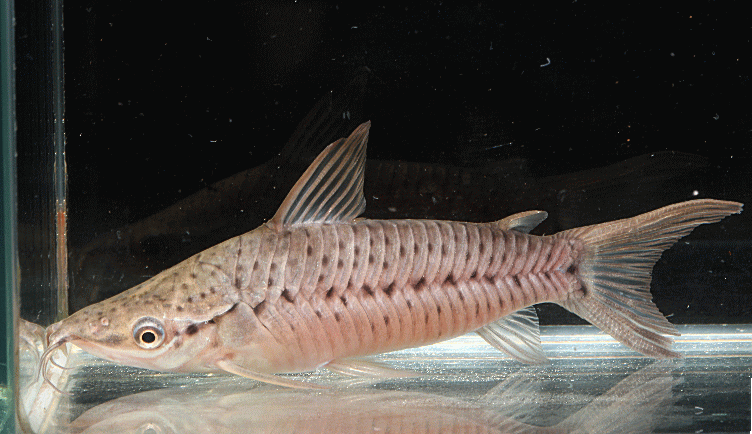
- Dianema longibarbis

Scientific classification
- Kingdom: Animalia
- Phylum: Chordata
- Class: Actinopterygii
- Order: Siluriformes
- Family: Callichthyidae
- Subfamily: Callichthyinae
- Genus: Dianema; Cope, 1871

Type species
- Dianema longibarbis Cope, 1872

Synonyms
- Decapogon C. H. Eigenmann & R. S. Eigenmann, 1888

= Dianema =

Genus of fishes

Dianema is a small genus of is a genus of freshwater ray-finned fish belonging to the family Callichthyidae and the subfamily Callichthyinae, the armored catfishes. Dianema was first formally recorded as a genus name in a meeting abtract in 1871 but no formally described species was named until Edward Drinker Cope described the type species, Dianema longibarbis, by monotypy the following year. The genus name is derived from the Greek di, meaning "two", and nema, meaning "filament", an allusion to the two long barbels on the maxilla. The two species of Dianema share approximately the same distribution, and are found in the Amazon River and lower courses of its tributaries. Dianema species have the habit of swimming midwater, as opposed to the bottom as in most callichthyids.

== Species ==
Dianema contains the following valid species:

- Dianema longibarbis Cope, 1872 (Porthole catfish)
- Dianema urostriatum (A. Miranda-Ribeiro, 1912) (Flagtail catfish)
