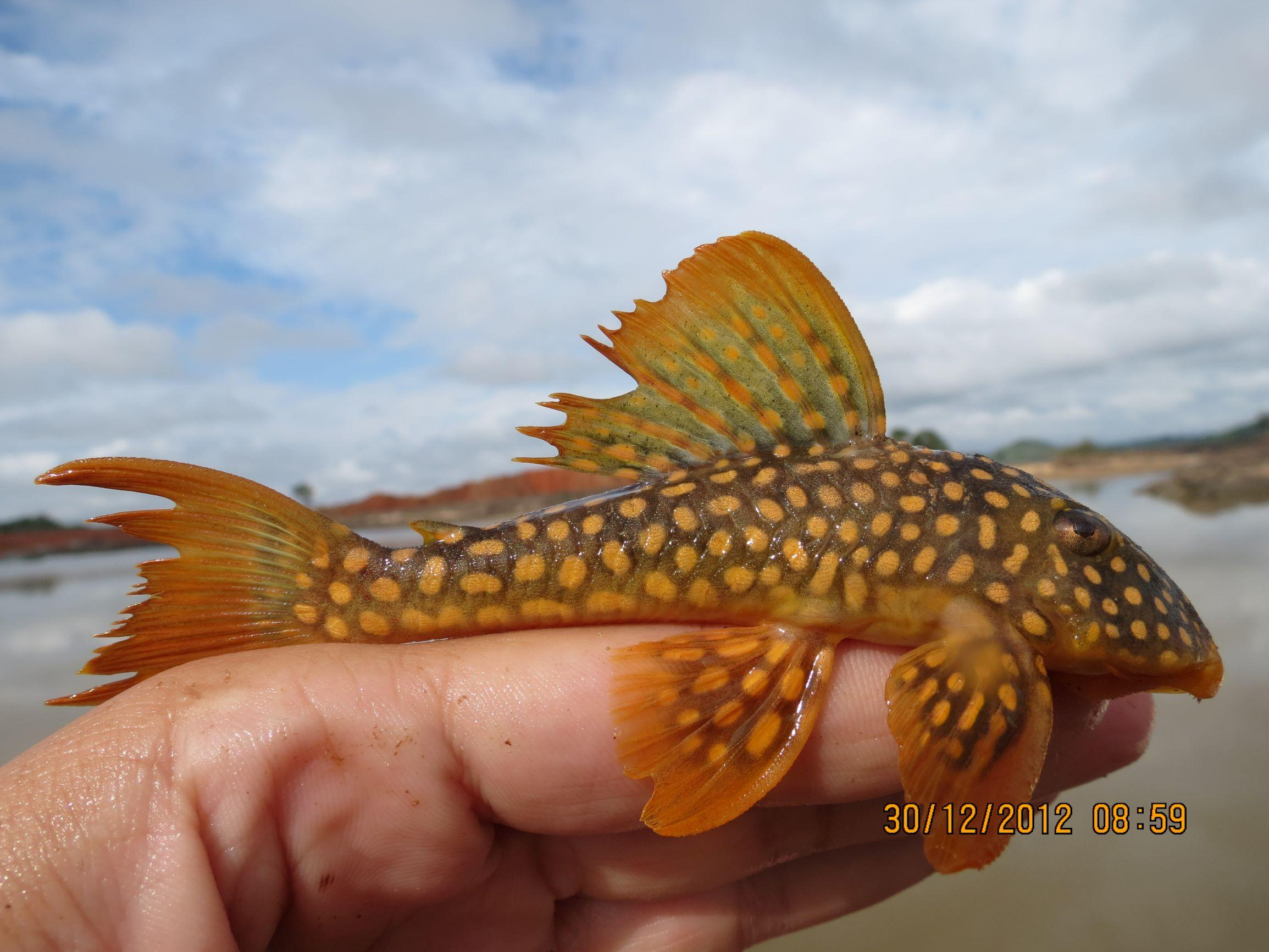

Conservation status
- Vulnerable (IUCN 3.1)

Scientific classification
- Kingdom: Animalia
- Phylum: Chordata
- Class: Actinopterygii
- Division: Teleostei
- Order: Siluriformes
- Family: Loricariidae
- Genus: Scobinancistrus
- Species: S. aureatus

Binomial name
- Scobinancistrus aureatus Burgess, 1994

= Scobinancistrus aureatus =

Species of fish

Scobinancistrus aureatus is a species of freshwater ray-finned fish belonging to the family Loricariidae, the suckermouth armoured catfishes, and the subfamily Hypostominae, the suckermouth catfishes. This catfish is found throughout the Xingu River basin in the Brazilian state of Pará, mainly in the Volta Grande do Xingu region, but records extend from São Félix do Xingu and in the lower Iriri region up to Cachoeira Grande do Iriri. This species reaches a total length of 26 cm (10 in).

S. aureatus appears in the aquarium trade, where it is typically referred to either as the sunshine pleco, as the goldie pleco, or by its associated L-number, which is L-014.
