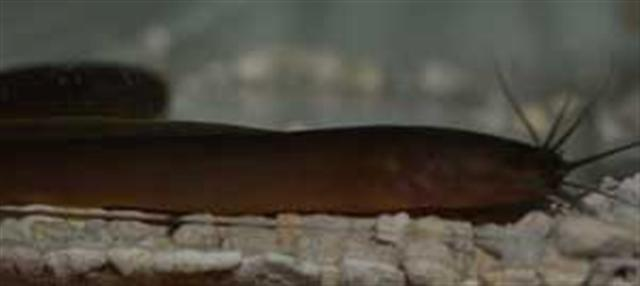
- Channallabes apus

Scientific classification
- Domain: Eukaryota
- Kingdom: Animalia
- Phylum: Chordata
- Class: Actinopterygii
- Order: Siluriformes
- Family: Clariidae
- Genus: Channallabes; Günther, 1873

Type species
- Gymnallabes apus Günther 1873

Species
- See text.

= Channallabes =

Genus of fishes

Channallabes is a genus of airbreathing catfishes found in Africa.

== Species ==
Six species in this genus are recognized:

- Channallabes alvarezi (Román, 1970)
- Channallabes apus (Günther, 1873) (eel catfish)
- Channallabes longicaudatus (Pappenheim, 1911)
- Channallabes ogooensis Devaere, Adriaens & Verraes, 2007
- Channallabes sanghaensis Devaere, Adriaens & Verraes, 2007
- Channallabes teugelsi Devaere, Adriaens & Verraes, 2007
