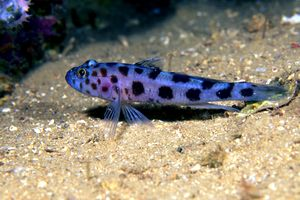
- Thorogobius ephippiatus

Scientific classification
- Kingdom: Animalia
- Phylum: Chordata
- Class: Actinopterygii
- Order: Gobiiformes
- Family: Gobiidae
- Genus: Thorogobius; P. J. Miller, 1969

Type species
- Gobius ephippiatus R. T. Lowe, 1839

= Thorogobius =

Genus of fishes

Thorogobius is a genus of gobies native to the eastern Atlantic Ocean and the Mediterranean Sea.

== Species ==
There are currently six recognized species in this genus:

- Thorogobius alvheimi Sauberer, Iwamoto & Ahnelt, 2018 (Alvheim's goby)
- Thorogobius angolensis (Norman, 1935)
- Thorogobius ephippiatus (R. T. Lowe, 1839) (Leopard-spotted goby)
- Thorogobius laureatus Sauberer, Iwamoto & Ahnelt, 2018 (Laurelled goby)
- Thorogobius macrolepis (Kolombatović, 1891) (Large-scaled goby)
- Thorogobius rofeni P. J. Miller, 1988
