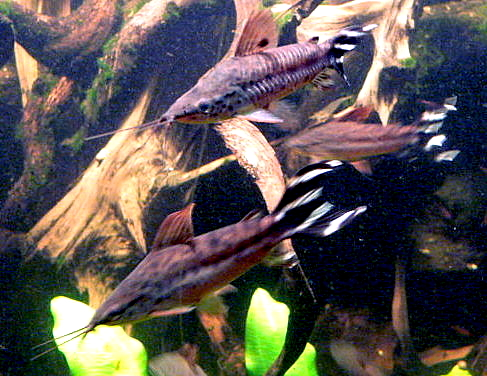

Conservation status
- Least Concern (IUCN 3.1)

Scientific classification
- Kingdom: Animalia
- Phylum: Chordata
- Class: Actinopterygii
- Order: Siluriformes
- Family: Callichthyidae
- Genus: Dianema
- Species: D. urostriatum

Binomial name
- Dianema urostriatum (A. Miranda-Ribeiro, 1912)

Synonyms
- Decapogon urostriatum A. Miranda-Ribeiro, 1912

= Flagtail catfish =

Species of fish

The flagtail catfish (Dianema urostriatum), or stripedtail catfish, is a species of freshwater ray-finned fish belonging to the family Callichthyidae and the subfamily Callichthyinae, the armored catfishes. This species is found in South America where it is found in the Amazon River basin of Brazil.

The fish will grow in length up to 12.5 cm (4.9 in). It natively inhabits waters with a pH range of 6.0 to 8.0, a hardness of 5 – 19 DH, and a temperature of 25–28 °C (77–82 °F).
