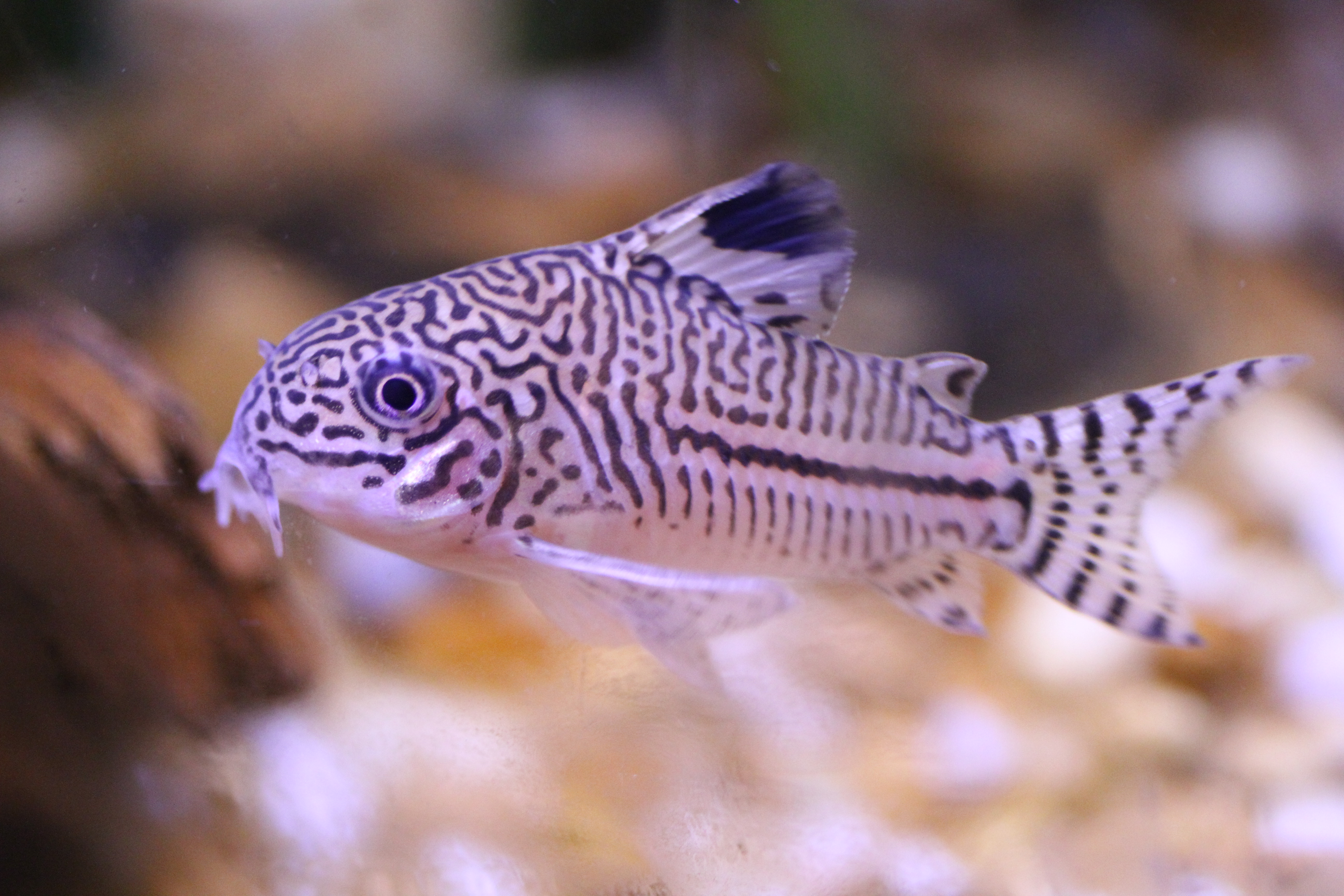

Conservation status
- Least Concern (IUCN 3.1)

Scientific classification
- Kingdom: Animalia
- Phylum: Chordata
- Class: Actinopterygii
- Order: Siluriformes
- Family: Callichthyidae
- Genus: Hoplisoma
- Species: H. trilineatum

Binomial name
- Hoplisoma trilineatum (Cope, 1872)

Synonyms
- Corydoras trilineatus Cope, 1872; Corydoras episcopi C. H. Eigenmann & Allen, 1942; Corydoras dubius Nijssen & Isbrücker, 1967

= Threestripe corydoras =

Species of fish

The threestripe corydoras (Hoplisoma trilineatum), leopard catfish, false julii corydoras, or three line catfish, is a species of freshwater ray-finned fish belonging to the subfamily Corydoradinae, the corys, of the family Callichthyidae, the armoured catfishes. This catfish is found in the central Amazon River basin in Brazil and Colombia, the Peruvian Amazon, and coastal rivers in Suriname.

The fish will grow in length up to 2.5 inches (64 mm). It lives in a tropical climate in water with a 6.0–8.0 pH, a water hardness of 5–19 dGH, and a temperature range of 72 to 79 °F (22 to 26 °C). It feeds on worms, benthic crustaceans, insects, and plant matter.

It lays eggs in dense vegetation, and adults do not guard the eggs. The female holds two to four eggs between her pelvic fins, where the male fertilizes them for about 30 seconds. Only then does the female swim to a suitable spot, where she attaches the very sticky eggs. The pair repeats this process until about 100 eggs have been fertilized and attached.

The three-stripe corydoras is of commercial importance in the aquarium trade industry. It is often mistakenly sold as Hoplisoma julii, since H. julii also has a horizontal stripe running along the sides of its body. The distinct difference between H. trilineatum and H. julii is in their markings. The hardier and more adaptable H. trilineatum has reticulations, while H. julii is distinguished by its "leopard" spots, although there is also a spotted form of H. trilineatum. They are best differentiated by the stripes on the side. In H. trilineatum, the stripes are much more pronounced and solid than in H. julii.

== See also ==
- List of freshwater aquarium fish species
