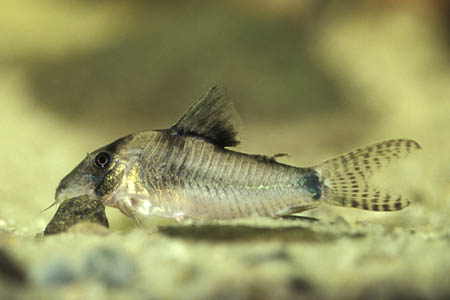

Conservation status
- Least Concern (IUCN 3.1)

Scientific classification
- Kingdom: Animalia
- Phylum: Chordata
- Class: Actinopterygii
- Order: Siluriformes
- Family: Callichthyidae
- Genus: Corydoras
- Species: C. septentrionalis

Binomial name
- Corydoras septentrionalis Gosline, 1940

= Corydoras septentrionalis =

Species of fish

Corydoras septentrionalis, the Northern kongnose cory, is a species of freshwater ray-finned fish belonging to the subfamily Corydoradinae, the corys, of the family Callichthyidae, the armoured catfishes. It originates in inland waters in South America, and is found in the Orinoco River basin in Colombia and Venezuela.

The fish is typically found in streams with water current. It will grow in length up to 1.9 inches (4.8 centimeters). It lives in a tropical climate in water with a 6.0 – 8.0 pH, a water hardness of 2 – 25 dGH, and a temperature range of 68–77 °F (20–25 °C). It feeds on worms, benthic crustaceans, insects, and plant matter. It lays eggs in dense vegetation and adults do not guard the eggs. The female holds 2–4 eggs between her pelvic fins, where the male fertilizes them for about 30 seconds. Only then does the female swim to a suitable spot, where she attaches the very sticky eggs. The pair repeats this process until about 100 eggs have been fertilized and attached.

== See also ==
- List of freshwater aquarium fish species
