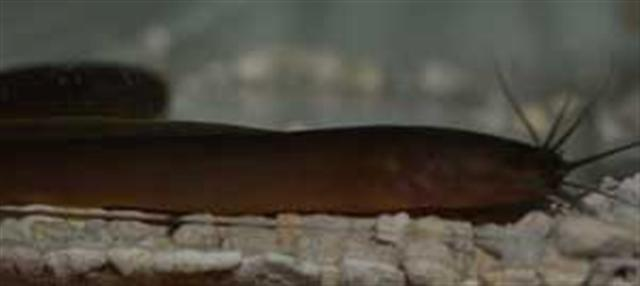

Conservation status
- Least Concern (IUCN 3.1)

Scientific classification
- Kingdom: Animalia
- Phylum: Chordata
- Class: Actinopterygii
- Order: Siluriformes
- Family: Clariidae
- Genus: Channallabes
- Species: C. apus

Binomial name
- Channallabes apus Günther, 1873

= Eel catfish =

Species of fish

The eel catfish (Channallabes apus) is an airbreathing catfish found in the muddy swamps of the tropics of Central Africa. It grows up to 32.7 cm (12.9 in) in total length, and is notable for its ability to propel itself out of the water to catch prey.

The thin, eel-shaped body of C. apus is black or dark brown, with widely spaced spines. A suprabranchial organ, formed by tree-like structures from the second and fourth gill arches, allows the eel catfish to take in oxygen directly from the air for short periods. Its eyes are small and hidden, and it lacks pectoral fins entirely. Like many anguilliform clariids, its jaw muscles are hypertrophied, a modification that has been linked to increased bite force.

The eel catfish hunts both in and out of the water, having a different method for each. In water, C. apus sucks water and food into its mouth. To catch food on land, the eel catfish lifts the front of its body up, and bends its mouth down on the prey. Its specially adapted spine allows it to do so without weight-bearing pectoral fins.
