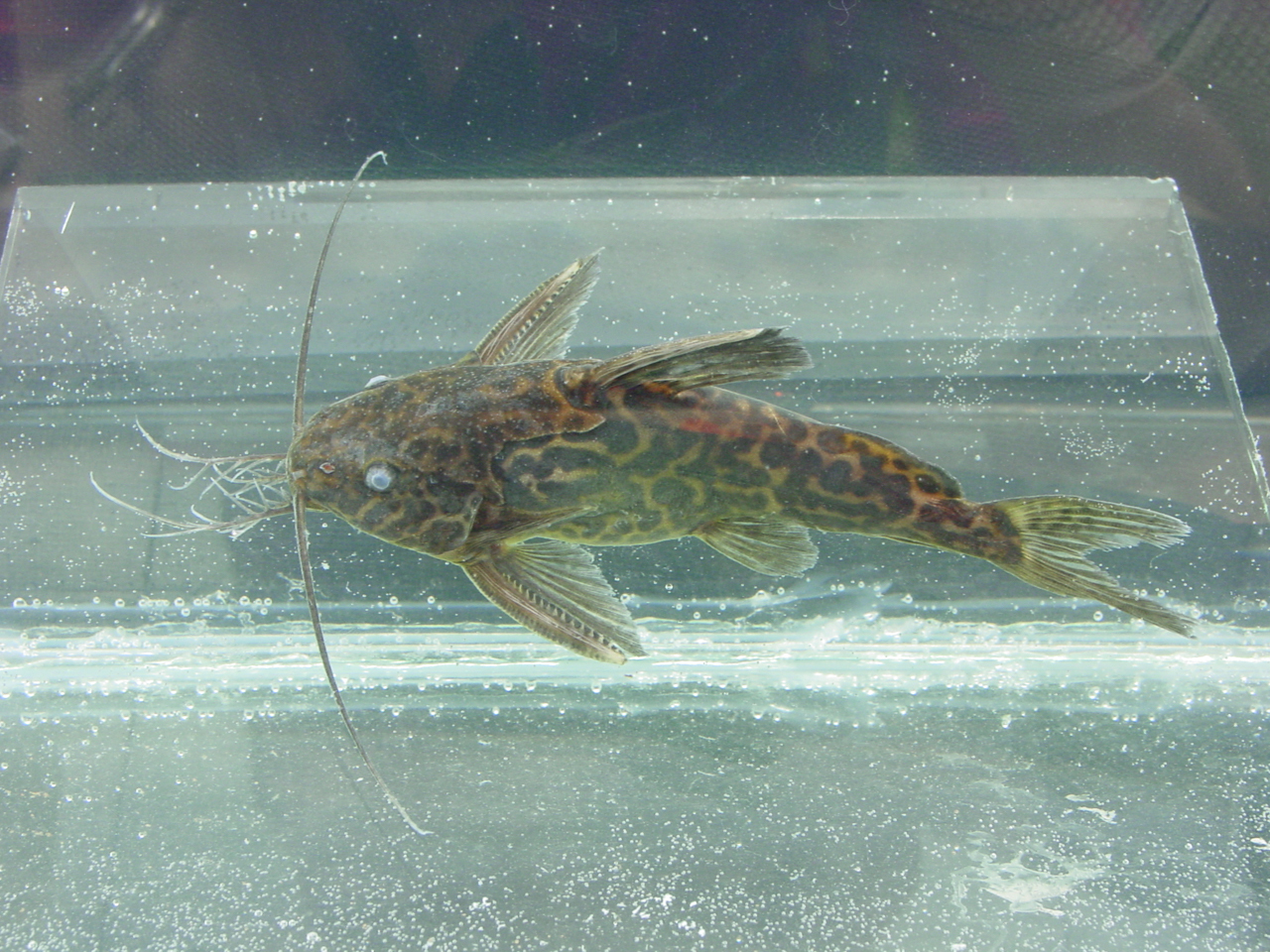

Conservation status
- Least Concern (IUCN 3.1)

Scientific classification
- Domain: Eukaryota
- Kingdom: Animalia
- Phylum: Chordata
- Class: Actinopterygii
- Order: Siluriformes
- Family: Mochokidae
- Genus: Synodontis
- Species: S. schoutedeni

Binomial name
- Synodontis schoutedeni David, 1936

= Synodontis schoutedeni =

Species of fish

Synodontis schoutedeni, known as the yellow marbled Synodontis, is a species of upside-down catfish native to the Congo Basin of the Democratic Republic of the Congo and the Republic of the Congo. It was first described by Belgian ichthyologist Lore Rose David in 1936, based upon a holotype discovered in Basongo, in what is now the Democratic Republic of the Congo. The specific name "schoutedeni" is named after the Belgian zoologist Henri Schouteden.

== Description ==
The fish is cream-colored with a brownish-mauve marbled pattern on the head, body, and adipose fin. Other fins are clear with dark spots. The color patterns on the fish tend to become more pronounced in older individuals.

Like other members of the genus, this fish has a humeral process, which is a bony spike that is attached to a hardened head cap on the fish and can be seen extending beyond the gill opening. The first ray of the dorsal fin and the pectoral fins have a hardened first ray which is serrated. The caudal fin is forked. It has short, cone-shaped teeth in the upper jaw. In the lower jaw, the teeth are s-shaped and movable. The fish has one pair of long, dark-colored maxillary barbels, that reach as far as the base of the ventral fins, and two pairs of mandibular barbels that are often branched. The pectoral fin spine is finely serrated on the outer edge, and heavily serrated on the inner edge.

This species grows to a standard length of 12.7 centimetres (5.0 in) although specimens up to 17.1 centimetres (6.7 in) total length have been recorded in the wild.

== Habitat ==
In the wild, the species inhabits tropical waters with a temperature range of 22 to 26 °C (72 to 79 °F), a pH of 6.0 – 7.5, and dH range of 4–15. It has been found in the central Congo River basin and in Pool Malebo. It is harvested for human consumption.
