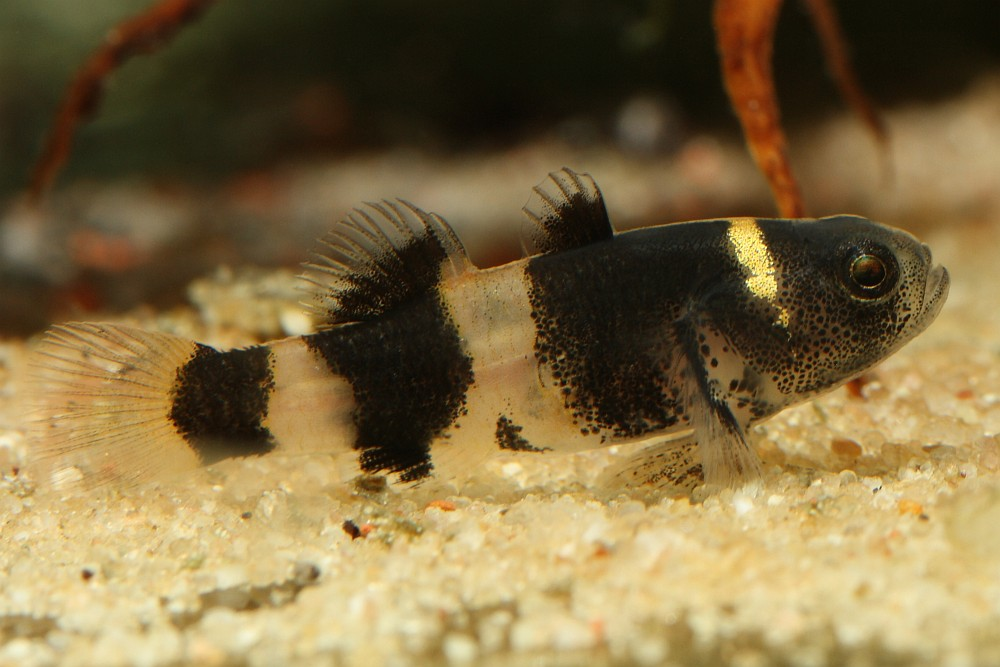

Conservation status
- Least Concern (IUCN 3.1)

Scientific classification
- Kingdom: Animalia
- Phylum: Chordata
- Class: Actinopterygii
- Order: Gobiiformes
- Family: Oxudercidae
- Genus: Brachygobius
- Species: B. doriae

Binomial name
- Brachygobius doriae (Günther, 1868)

Synonyms
- Gobius doriae Günther, 1868; Hypogymnogobius doriae (Günther, 1868)

= Brachygobius doriae =

Species of fish

Brachygobius doriae, the bumblebee goby, is a species of goby native to fresh and brackish waters of Indonesia, Brunei, Singapore, Malaysia, Cambodia, Thailand and Vietnam. This species can reach 4.2 centimetres (1.7 in) TL. It may be found in the aquarium trade.

== Etymology ==
This fish is named in honor of zoologist Giacoma Doria (1840-1913), who was the president of the Italian Geographic Society, and who collected fish in Borneo and sent them to the Natural History Museum, including the type specimen of this species.
