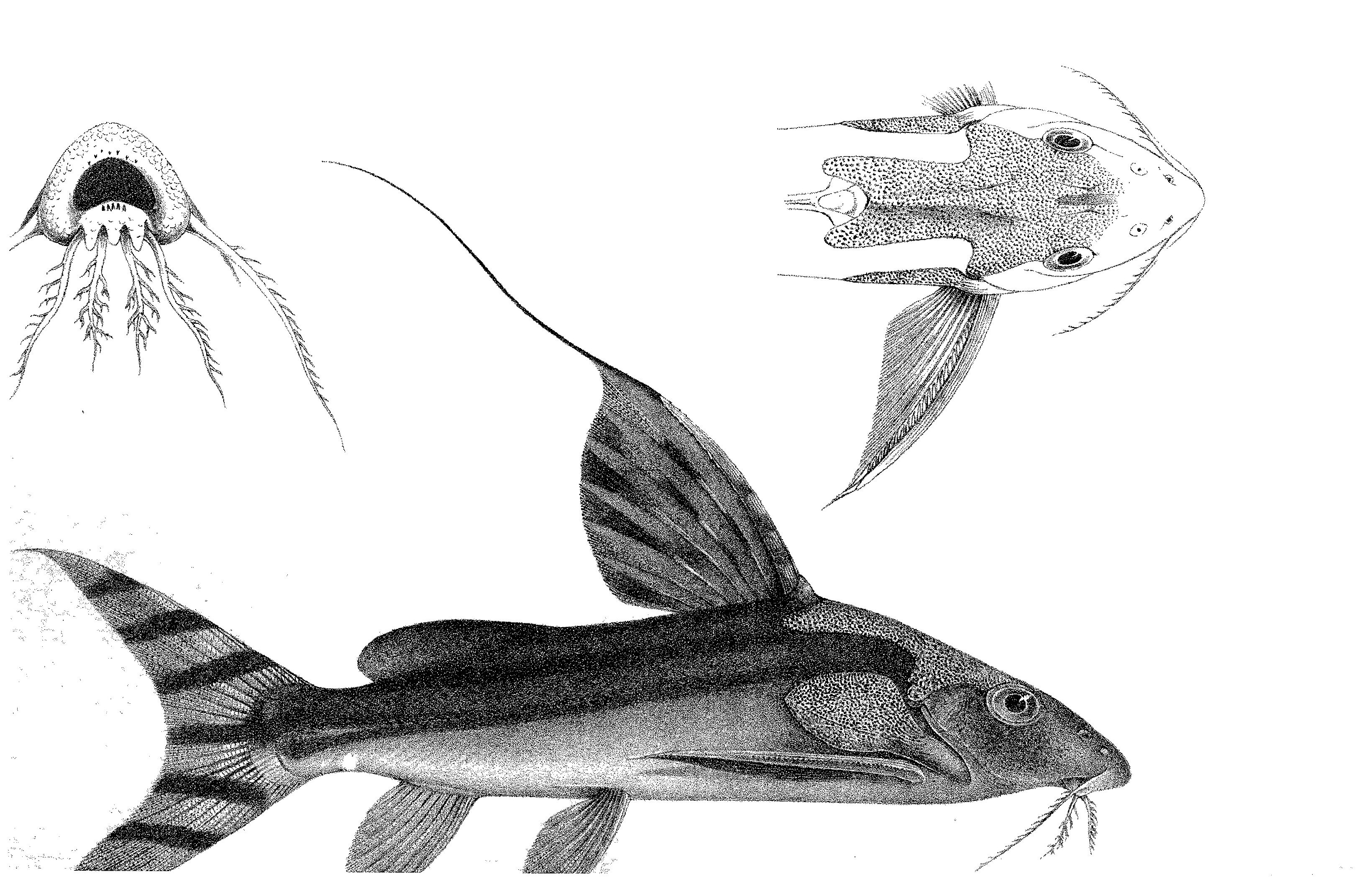

Conservation status
- Least Concern (IUCN 3.1)

Scientific classification
- Kingdom: Animalia
- Phylum: Chordata
- Class: Actinopterygii
- Order: Siluriformes
- Family: Mochokidae
- Genus: Synodontis
- Species: S. decorus

Binomial name
- Synodontis decorus Boulenger, 1899

= Synodontis decorus =

Species of fish

Synodontis decorus is a species of upside-down catfish. Common names include clown catfish, clown synodontis, clown syno, clown squeaker, and barredtail squeaker.

== Distribution ==
Synodontis decorus is native to Cameroon, the Democratic Republic of the Congo and the Republic of the Congo can be found anywhere in the Congo Basin except the Luapula River system. This is one of the many interesting Synodontis species found in Malebo Pool.

== Description ==
=== Size, age, and growth ===
This species grows to a length of 31.8 centimetres (12.5 in) TL.

== Parasites ==
As with other fish, Synodontis decorus harbours parasites, including species of the monogenean genus Synodontella.
