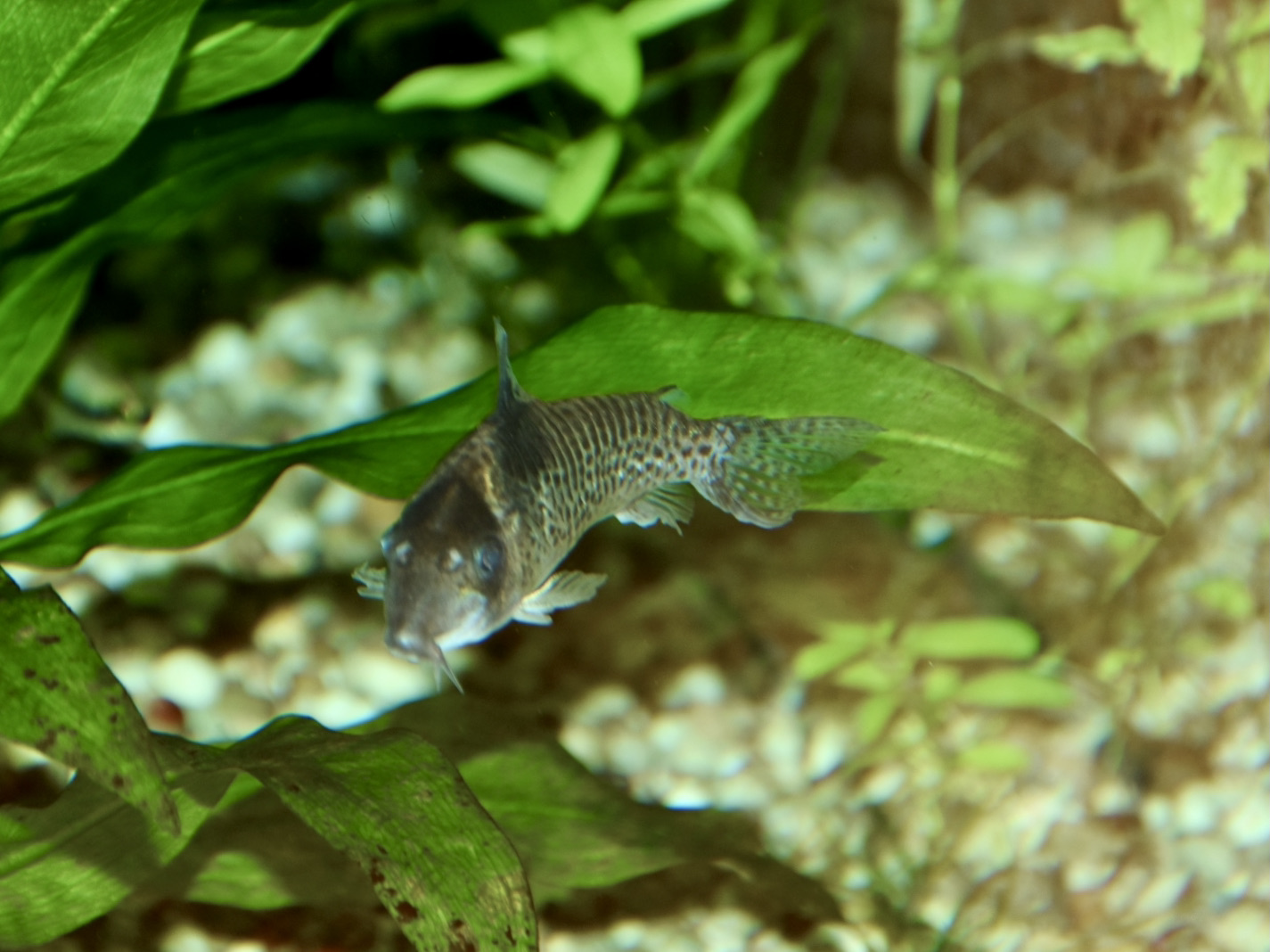

Conservation status
- Least Concern (IUCN 3.1)

Scientific classification
- Kingdom: Animalia
- Phylum: Chordata
- Class: Actinopterygii
- Order: Siluriformes
- Family: Callichthyidae
- Genus: Brochis
- Species: B. agassizii

Binomial name
- Brochis agassizii (Steindacher, 1876)

Synonyms
- Corydoras agassizii Steindachner, 1876

= Brochis agassizii =

Species of fish

Brochis agassizii is a species of freshwater ray-finned fish belonging the family Callichthyidae, the armored catfishes, and the subfamily Corydoradinae, the corys. This catfish is found in the Amazon basin. It can be found in the border area of Peru and Brazil. It lives in tropical waters with a water temperature of 22–26 °C (72–79 °F), a pH of 6.0 – 8.0 and a hardness of 2 – 25 dH.

According to FishBase, the fish has a standard length of 5.2 cm (2.0 in). Like other members of its genus, it is a bottom-dwelling and shoaling species. It has an omnivorous diet. Breeding occurs similarly as in other species. The female holds two to four eggs between her pelvic fins, which are then fertilized by the male. After fertilization, the female deposits the sticky eggs. This process is then repeated until about 100 eggs are laid. The species can be found in the aquarium trade.

It is named in honor of zoologist-geologist Louis Agassiz.

== See also ==
- List of freshwater aquarium fish species
