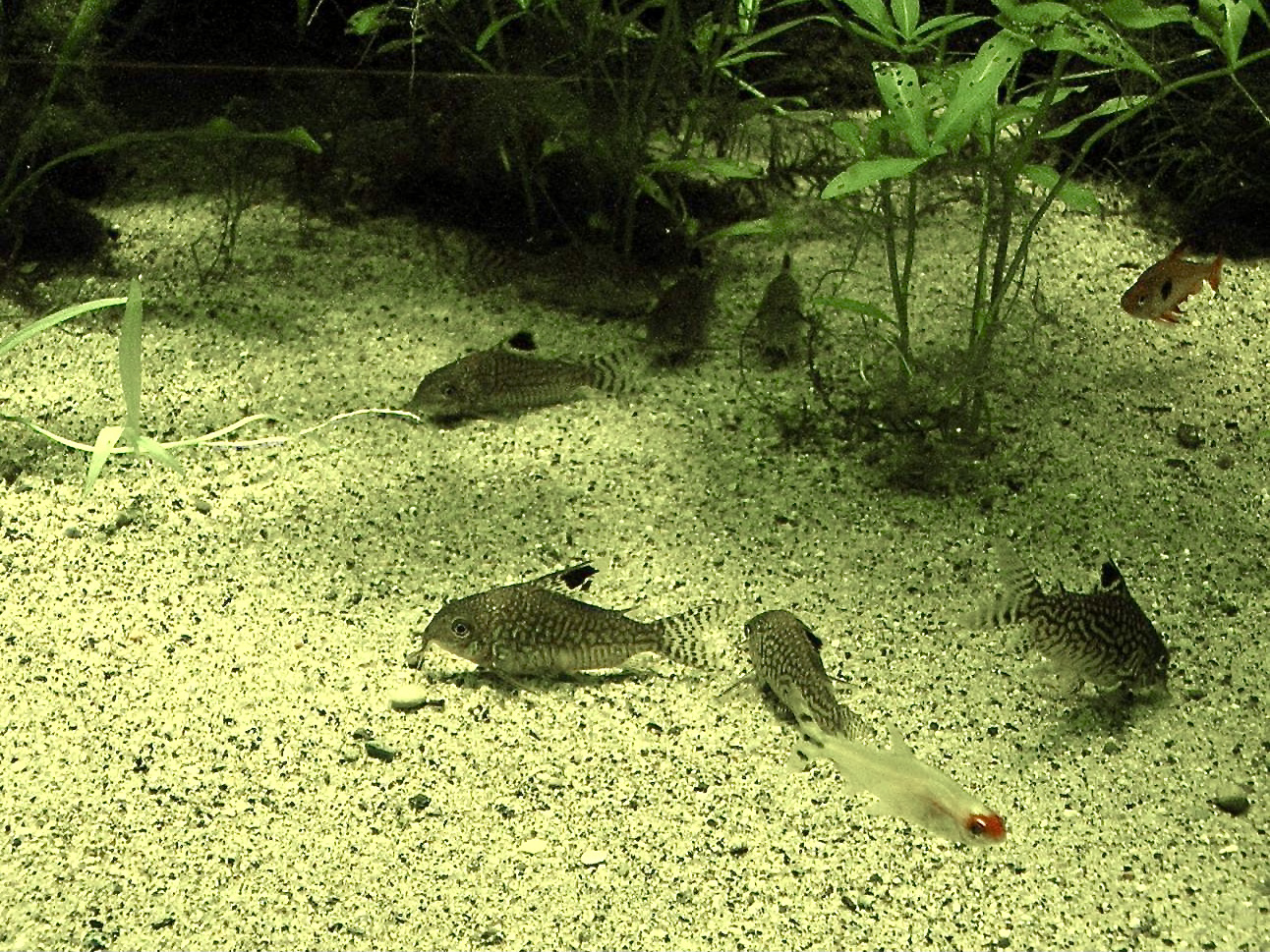

Conservation status
- Least Concern (IUCN 3.1)

Scientific classification
- Kingdom: Animalia
- Phylum: Chordata
- Class: Actinopterygii
- Order: Siluriformes
- Family: Callichthyidae
- Genus: Brochis
- Species: B. reticulata

Binomial name
- Brochis reticulata (Fraser-Brunner, 1938)

Synonyms
- Corydoras reticulatus Fraser-Brunner, 1938

= Brochis reticulata =

Reticulated corydoras

Species of fish

Brochis reticulata, also called the reticulated corydoras, mosaic corydoras, network catfish, or network corydoras, is a species of freshwater ray-finned fish belonging the family Callichthyidae, the armored catfishes, and the subfamily Corydoradinae, the corys. This species is found in the Lower Amazon River basin in Brazil.

The fish grows up to 2.4 inches (6.1 centimeters) in length. It lives in a tropical climate in water with a 6.0–8.0 pH, a water hardness of 2–25 dGH, and a temperature range of 72–79 °F (22–26 °C). It feeds on worms, benthic crustaceans, insects, and plant matter. It lays eggs in dense vegetation and adults do not guard the eggs. The female holds 2–4 eggs between her pelvic fins, where the male fertilizes them for about 30 seconds. Only then does the female swim to a suitable spot, where she attaches the very sticky eggs. The pair repeats this process until about 100 eggs have been fertilized and attached.

The reticulated corydoras is of commercial importance in the aquarium trade industry.

== See also ==
- List of freshwater aquarium fish species
