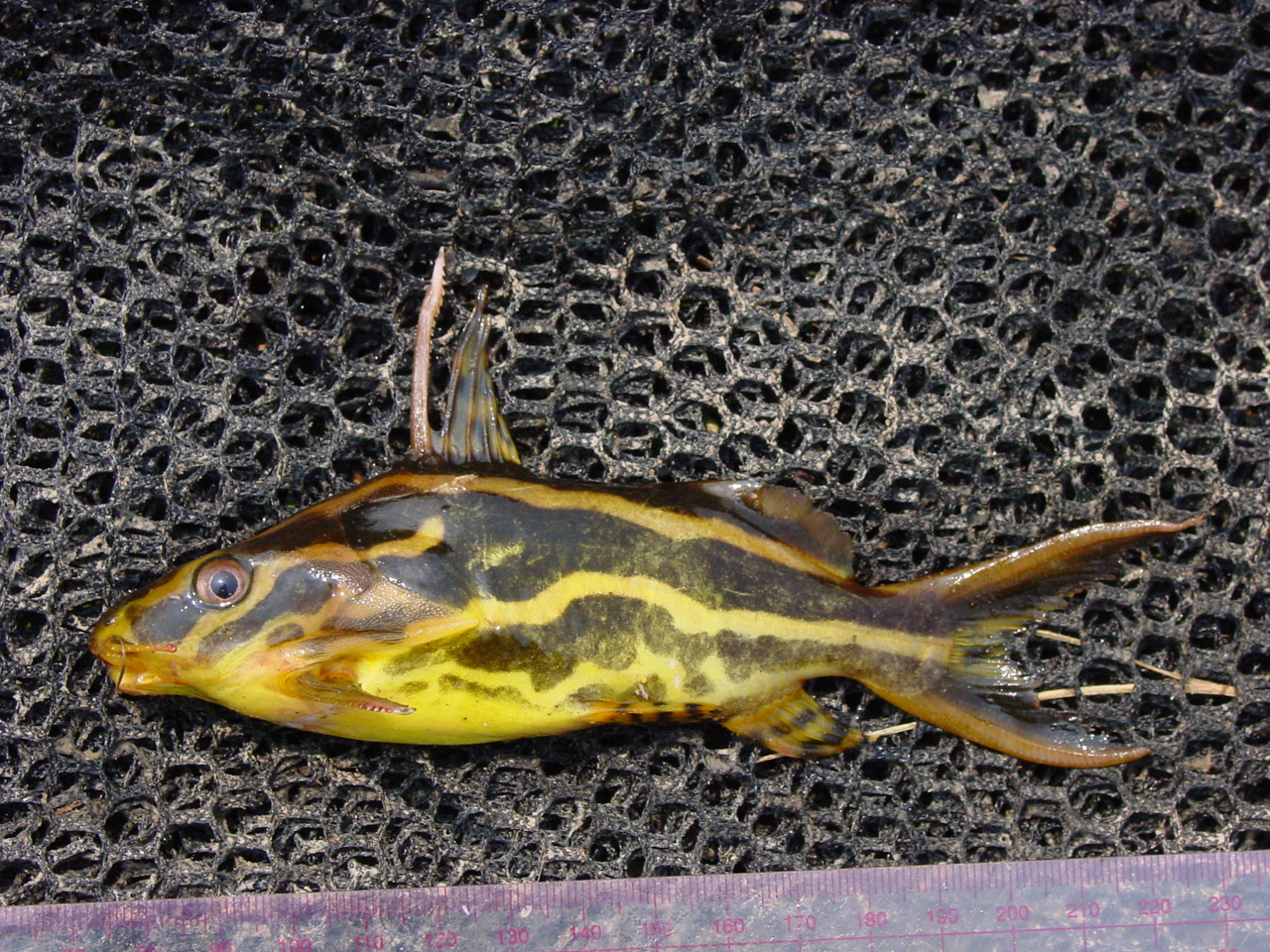

Conservation status
- Least Concern (IUCN 3.1)

Scientific classification
- Domain: Eukaryota
- Kingdom: Animalia
- Phylum: Chordata
- Class: Actinopterygii
- Order: Siluriformes
- Family: Mochokidae
- Genus: Synodontis
- Species: S. flavitaeniatus

Binomial name
- Synodontis flavitaeniatus Boulenger, 1919

= Synodontis flavitaeniatus =

Species of fish

Synodontis flavitaeniatus, known as the orangestriped squeaker, the chocolatestriped squeaker, the yellowstriped squeaker, and the pyjama Syno, is a species of upside-down catfish native to the Democratic Republic of the Congo and the Republic of the Congo where it is found in the lower and central Congo Basin. It was first described by Belgian-British zoologist George Albert Boulenger in 1919. The holotype was collected from the Ruki River at Eala, in the Democratic Republic of the Congo. The meaning of the specific name "flavitaeniatus" is "yellow stripes".

== Description ==
The body of the fish is brownish or orange-brown and is marked with yellow and dark brown horizontal bands. The underside of the fish is a lighter brown with small irregular blotches. The dorsal, pectoral, ventral, and anal fins are clear and marked with contrasting dark-colored spots. The adipose fin is dark except for the extreme tip which is lighter. The bands in the body extend through the strongly-forked caudal fin with light patches at the edges and center. When stressed, the brown coloration can be tinged with pink. Older individuals may be yellowish-brown.

Like other members of the genus, this fish has a humeral process, which is a bony spike that is attached to a hardened head cap on the fish and can be seen extending beyond the gill opening. The first ray of the dorsal fin and the pectoral fins have a hardened first ray which is serrated. The caudal fin is deeply forked with an extension on the top lobe. It has short, cone-shaped teeth in the upper jaw. In the lower jaw, the teeth are s-shaped and movable. The fish has one pair of short maxillary barbels, and two pairs of mandibular barbels that are often branched.

This species grows to a length of 15.5 centimetres (6.1 in) SL although specimens up to 19.5 centimetres (7.7 in) TL have been recorded in nature.

In the wild, the species inhabits tropical waters with a temperature range of 23 to 28 °C (73 to 82 °F), a pH of 6.5 – 8.0, and dH range of 4–25.
