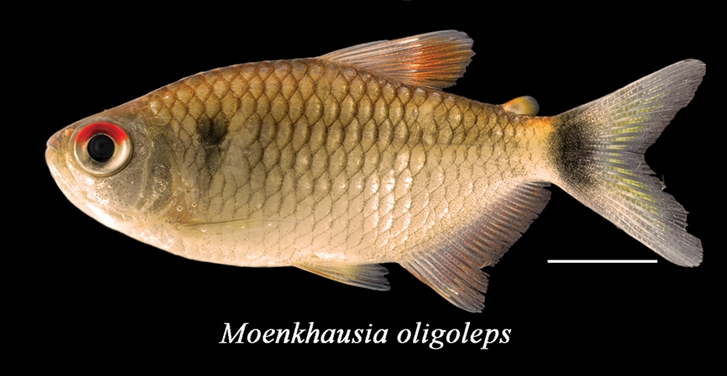

Scientific classification
- Kingdom: Animalia
- Phylum: Chordata
- Class: Actinopterygii
- Order: Characiformes
- Family: Acestrorhamphidae
- Genus: Moenkhausia
- Species: M. oligolepis

Binomial name
- Moenkhausia oligolepis (Günther, 1864)

Synonyms
- Tetragonopterus oligolepis Günther, 1864

= Moenkhausia oligolepis =

Species of ray-finned fish

Moenkhausia oligolepis, commonly known as the redeye tetra and the glass tetra, is a species of ray-finned fish in the family Acestrorhamphidae.
