= Brochis robineae =

Conservation status
- Least Concern (IUCN 3.1)

Scientific classification
- Kingdom: Animalia
- Phylum: Chordata
- Class: Actinopterygii
- Order: Siluriformes
- Family: Callichthyidae
- Genus: Brochis
- Species: B. robineae

Binomial name
- Brochis robineae (Burgess, 1983)

Synonyms
- Corydoras robineae Burgess, 1983

Species of fish

Brochis robineae, the banner-tail corydoras, is a species of freshwater ray-finned fish belonging the family Callichthyidae, the armored catfishes, and the subfamily Corydoradinae, the corys. This species is restricted to the Upper Rio Negro basin in Brazil.

== Etymology ==
The fish is named in honor of Robine Schwartz, mother of aquarium-fish collector and exporter Adolfo Schwartz, who supplied the type specimen and asked that his mother be honored with the fish's name.
