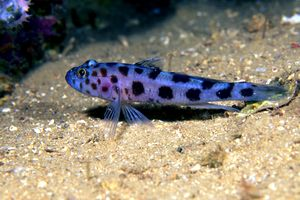

Conservation status
- Least Concern (IUCN 3.1)

Scientific classification
- Kingdom: Animalia
- Phylum: Chordata
- Class: Actinopterygii
- Order: Gobiiformes
- Family: Gobiidae
- Genus: Thorogobius
- Species: T. ephippiatus

Binomial name
- Thorogobius ephippiatus (R. T. Lowe, 1839)

Synonyms
- Gobius ephippiatus R. T. Lowe, 1839; Gobius thori F. de Buen, 1928; Gobius forsteri Corbin, 1958

= Leopard-spotted goby =

Species of fish

Thorogobius ephippiatus, the leopard-spotted goby, is a species of goby native to the eastern Atlantic Ocean and the Mediterranean Sea.

== Description ==
This species can reach a length of 13 centimetres (5.1 in) TL.

== Distribution and habitat ==
This species can be found along the Atlantic coasts from the Skagerrak to Madeira, extending into the Mediterranean. This species inhabits vertical rock faces with crevices in which to hide. Sometimes it can be found in deep tide pools. It occurs at depths of from 6 to 40 metres (20 to 131 ft) though usually no deeper than 12 metres (39 ft).
