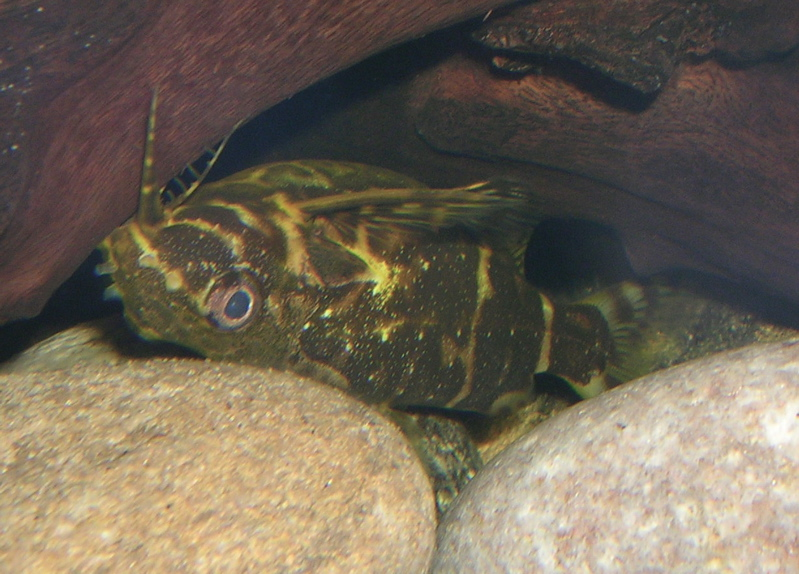

Conservation status
- Least Concern (IUCN 3.1)

Scientific classification
- Kingdom: Animalia
- Phylum: Chordata
- Class: Actinopterygii
- Division: Teleostei
- Order: Siluriformes
- Family: Mochokidae
- Genus: Synodontis
- Species: S. nigriventris

Binomial name
- Synodontis nigriventris David, 1936

= Synodontis nigriventris =

Species of fish

Synodontis nigriventris, common name the blotched upside-down catfish or back-swimming Congo Catfish is a species of upside-down catfish native to the Congo Basin of Cameroon, the Democratic Republic of the Congo and the Republic of the Congo.

== Appearance and anatomy ==
Blotched upside-down catfish are small, reaching a maximum of 9.6 centimetres (3.8 in) SL. Like other members of the family Mochokidae, they have large eyes, a large dorsal fin and three pair of barbels. These fish are adapted to spend most of their time upside-down. This is reflected in the fish's pigmentation – their bellies are darker than their backs, a form of countershading. These fish have lighter colors on the top of their bodies and darker colors below used for camouflage. The lighter colors on the top of them make it harder for predators to see the fish when looking up toward the sky but only when the fish are swimming upside-down.

== Ecology and behaviour ==
Synodontis nigriventris are mostly nocturnal, and feed on insects, crustaceans, and plant matter. These fish lay eggs. The young fish do not swim upside-down until they are about two months old. Adults swim and rest upside down in the water. They swim faster when upside down, and are more likely to be upside down around objects or at the water bottom. The more objects around the fish, the more they tend to swim upside down. When close to an object, the fish puts its ventral side closest to the object. It rarely swims in the middle of the water, preferring to swim either at the bottom or at the surface. By swimming upside down when it feeds, it can readily catch prey at the surface from beneath.

== In the aquarium ==
The blotched upside-down catfish is well suited to aquariums because of its small size (typically 9 or 10 cm or less) and peaceful demeanor.

== See also ==
- List of freshwater aquarium fish species
