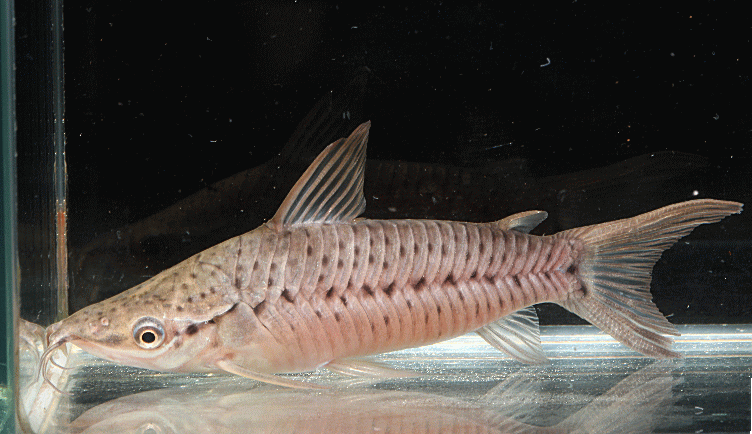

Conservation status
- Least Concern (IUCN 3.1)

Scientific classification
- Kingdom: Animalia
- Phylum: Chordata
- Class: Actinopterygii
- Order: Siluriformes
- Family: Callichthyidae
- Genus: Dianema
- Species: D. longibarbis

Binomial name
- Dianema longibarbis Cope, 1872

Synonyms
- Callichthys adspersus Steindachner, 1876; Decapogon verissimi A. Miranda-Ribeiro, 1911

= Porthole catfish =

Species of fish

The porthole catfish (Dianema longibarbis), or slender catfish, is a species of freshwater ray-finned fish belonging to the family Callichthyidae and the subfamily Callichthyinae, the armored catfishes. This species is found in South America where it is found in the Amazon River basin of Brazil, Ecuador, Colombia, Bolivia and Peru.

The fish will grow in length up to 8.2 centimetres (3.2 in). It natively inhabits waters with a pH range of 5.5 to 7.5, a hardness of 2–20 DH, and a temperature of 22–26 °C (72–79 °F).
