= Isaäc J. H. Isbrücker =

Dutch ichthyologist

Isaäc Jan Hendrik Isbrücker (born 1944) is a retired Dutch ichthyologist who specialised in the scientific classification of South American catfish (suborder Loricarioidei).

== Life and work ==
Between 1960 and 1985, Isbrücker was a keeper of the aquarium in the Amsterdam Zoo. He then became responsible for fish collection of the Zoological Museum in Amsterdam, which was transferred to the Naturalis Centre in Leiden in 2011. Between 1969 and 2006, Isbrücker appeared as author or co-author of more than 80 publications, in which he described roughly a dozen new fish species, including the genus Hypancistrus. His work focuses on the taxonomy of the armored catfish.

== Taxa named in his honor ==
- the cichlid Crenicichla isbrueckeri Ploeg, 1991
- the armored catfish Hypostomus isbrueckeri dos Reis, Weber & Malabarba, 1990
- the armored catfish Corydoras isbrueckeri Knaack, 2004

== Taxon described by him ==
- See Category:Taxa named by Isaäc J. H. Isbrücker
