= Joachim Knaack =

German biologist and hobby ichthyologist (1933–2012)

- Born: 2 January 1933; Potsdam, Germany
- Died: 5 December 2012 (aged 79); Neuglobsow, Germany
- Known for: Description of South American catfish species
- Scientific career
- Fields: Biology; ichthyology

Joachim Knaack (2 January 1933 – 5 December 2012) was a German biologist and physician. As a hobby ichthyologist and aquarist, he specialized from the 1950s in the scientific description of South American catfish species and in the care and breeding of ornamental fish.

== Biography ==
Knaack studied biology at the University of Leipzig and was the first student of Günther Sterba. He initially focused on the native fish fauna and received his doctorate in 1961 with a dissertation on the biology and parasitology of local loaches (Cobitidae).

In the early 1960s, he described several armored catfish from the Rio Guaporé in Brazil, including the popular aquarium species Corydoras sterbai. Although he was considered a leading authority on aquarium science in the German Democratic Republic, he was politically discouraged from publishing in Western journals. Only after German reunification and his retirement was he able to travel to Brazil to study the habitats of the fish he had described decades earlier. From 1999 to 2007, he described additional species on expeditions south of the Amazon River. Overall, Knaack described 17 new species of armored catfish and 5 species of suckermouth catfish (Loricariidae). He emphasized documenting both the external morphology of species and their care, breeding, and development.

During his time in the GDR, Knaack was also an accomplished sport diver. From 1953 until his retirement in 1993, he worked at the Bezirkshygieneinstitut Potsdam, eventually serving as director. He was married and had a son and a daughter.
