= DGH =

Unit of water hardness

Degrees of general hardness (dGH or °GH) is a unit of water hardness, specifically of general hardness. General hardness is a measure of the concentration of divalent metal ions such as calcium (Ca^{2+}) and magnesium (Mg^{2+}) per volume of water. Specifically, 1 dGH is defined as 10 milligrams (mg) of calcium oxide (CaO) per litre of water. Since CaO has a molar mass of 56.08 g/mol, 1 dGH is equivalent to 0.17832 mmol per litre of elemental calcium and/or magnesium ions.

In water testing hardness is often measured in parts per million (ppm), where one part per million is defined as one milligram of calcium carbonate (CaCO_{3}) per litre of water. Consequently, 1 dGH corresponds to 10 ppm CaO but 17.848 ppm CaCO_{3} which has a molar mass of 100.09 g/mol.

A degree of general hardness is equal to a German degree of hardness or Deutsche Härte (°dH).

The German 2007 Wasch- und Reinigungsmittelgesetz (WRMG) ("Detergent and Cleansing Agent Act") defines water hardness in terms of millimoles of calcium carbonate per litre according to the below table (one mmol of calcium carbonate corresponds to 5.60 °GH).

Water hardness	mmol CaCO_{3}/L	°GH
soft	less than 1.5	less than 8.4 °GH
medium	1.5 to 2.5	8.4 to 14 °GH
hard	more than 2.5	more than 14 °GH

== See also ==
- Carbonate hardness
- Hard water
- dKH
