= List of freshwater aquarium fish species =

A vast number of freshwater species have successfully adapted to live in aquariums. This list gives some examples of the most common species found in home aquariums organized by phylogeny.

== Rays (Batomorphi) ==
=== Stingrays (Order Myliobatiformes) ===
Note that the stingrays listed below are equipped with venomous barbs that contain a protein-based poison. An aquarist who gets stung should submerge their wound in very hot water in order to break down the poison.

Common name	Scientific name	Image	Size	Remarks	Tank size	Temperature range	pH range	Water hardness
Ocellate river stingray	Potamotrygon motoro		50 cm (19.5 in)					
Black devil stingray	Potamotrygon leopoldi		111 cm (43.5 in)					
Marbled whipray	Fluvitrygon oxyrhynchus		36 cm (14 in)					

== Lungfish (Dipnoi) ==
Common name	Scientific name	Image	Size	Remarks	Tank size	Temperature range	pH range	Water hardness
West African lungfish	Protopterus annectens		100 cm (39 in)					
Spotted lungfish	Protopterus dolloi		130 cm (51 in)					
South American lungfish	Lepidosiren paradoxa		125 cm (49 in)					
Australian lungfish	Neoceratodus forsteri		150 cm (59 in)					

== Bichirs and Reedfish (Polypteriformes) ==
Common name	Scientific name	Image	Size	Remarks	Tank size	Temperature range	pH range	Water hardness
Gray bichir, Senegal bichir, or dinosaur bichir	Polypterus senegalus		70.0 cm (27.6 in) maximum length40.0 centimetres (15.7 in) in captivity	Peaceful but preys on anything smaller than its mouth		25–28 °C (77–82 °F)	6.0-8.0	
Ornate bichir	Polypterus ornatipinnis		60 cm (24 in) maximum length	Peaceful but preys on anything smaller than its mouth		26–28 °C (79–82 °F)	6.0–8.0	
Retropinnis bichir	Polypterus retropinnis		34.0 cm (13.4 in)	Peaceful but preys on anything smaller than its mouth		26–28 °C (79–82 °F)	6.5–7.5	
Barred bichir	Polypterus delhezi		35 cm (14 in)	Peaceful but preys on anything smaller than its mouth		24–30 °C (75–86 °F)	6-8	
Saddled bichir	Polypterus endlicherii		63 cm (25 in)	Peaceful but preys on anything smaller than its mouth		22–27 °C (72–81 °F)	6-8	
Reedfish	Erpetoichthys calabaricus		31.4 cm (12.4 in) at maturity, 37 centimetres (15 in) maximum length			22–28 °C (72–82 °F)	6.0–8.0	

== Paddlefish and Sturgeons (Acipenseriformes) ==
Common name	Scientific name	Image	Size	Remarks	Tank size	Temperature range	pH range	Water hardness
Sterlet	Acipenser ruthenus		125 cm (49 in)					
Shovelnose Sturgeon	Scaphirhynchus platorynchus							
Sturddlefish(hybrid)	Polyodon spathula × Huso gueldenstaedtii							
American paddlefish	Polyodon spathula		150 cm (59 in)					

== Bowfins and gars (Holostei) ==
=== Bowfins (Order Amiiformes) ===
Common name	Scientific name	Image	Size	Remarks	Tank size	Temperature range	pH range	Water hardness
Bowfin	Amia calva		109 cm (43 in)					

=== Gars (Order Lepisosteiformes) ===
Common name	Scientific name	Image	Size	Remarks	Tank size	Temperature range	pH range	Water hardness
Spotted Gar	Lepisosteus oculatus		70 cm (27.5 in)					
Longnose Gar	Lepisosteus osseus		200 cm (78.5 in)					
Florida Gar	Lepisosteus platyrhincus		70 cm (27.5 in)					
Alligator Gar	Atractosteus spatula		300 cm (118 in)					
Cuban Gar	Atractosteus tristoechus		200 cm (78.5 in)					
Tropical Gar	Atractosteus tropicus		150 cm (59 in)					

== Basal freshwater fish ==
=== Osteoglossiformes ===
Common name	Scientific name	Image	Size	Remarks	Tank size	Temperature range	pH range	Water Hardness
Blunt-jawed elephantnose	Campylomormyrus tamandua		40 cm (16 in)					
Peters' elephant nose	Gnathonemus petersii		22.5 cm (8.9 in)					
African butterflyfish	Pantodon buchholzi		12 cm (4.7 in)					
Aba aba	Gymnarchus niloticus		120 cm (47 in)					
Reticulated knifefish	Papyrocranus afer		80 cm (31 in)					
African brown knifefish	Xenomystus nigri		30 cm (12 in)					
Royal knifefish	Chitala blanci		120 cm (47 in)					
Clown knifefish	Chitala ornata		100 cm (39 in)					
Asian arowana	Scleropages formosus		90 cm (35 in)	Preys on anything smaller than its mouth.				
Gulf saratoga	Scleropages jardinii		90 cm (35 in)					
Southern saratoga	Scleropages leichardti		90 cm (35 in)					
Silver arowana	Osteoglossum bicirrhosum		90 cm (35 in)	Preys on anything smaller than its mouth.				
Black arowana	Osteoglossum ferreirai		90 cm (35 in)	Preys on anything smaller than its mouth.				
Pirarucu	Arapaima gigas		200 cm (79 in)					
African arowana	Heterotis niloticus		100 cm (39 in)					

=== True Eels (Anguilliformes) ===
Common name	Scientific name	Image	Size	Remarks	Tank size	Temperature range	pH range	Water Hardness
Freshwater moray	Gymnothorax polyuranodon		150 cm (59 in)					
Fire eel	Mastacembelus erythrotaenia		100 cm (39 in)					
Tire track eel	Mastacembelus armatus		90 cm (35 in)					
Peacock eel	Macrognathus siamensis		30 cm (12 in)	They require clean water and are vulnerable to parasites, fungal diseases, and the copper-based drugs used to treat these conditions.		73-82 °F (23-28 °C)	6.0-8.0	
Zebra spiny eel	Macrognathus zebrinus		46 cm (18 in)					
Half-banded spiny eel	Macrognathus circumcinctus		20 cm (7.9 in)					
Lesser spiny eel	Macrognathus tapirus		38 cm (15 in)					

== Most freshwater fish (Otocephala) ==
=== Milkfish (Gonorynchiformes) ===
Common name	Scientific name	Image	Size	Remarks	Tank size	Temperature range	pH range	Water Hardness
Hingemouth	Phractolaemus ansorgii		25 cm (9.8 in)					

=== Tetras, hatchetfish, pencilfish, piranhas, etc (Characiformes) ===
==== Tetras ====
Common name	Scientific name	Image	Size	Remarks	Tank size	Temperature range	pH range	Water Hardness
Arowana tetra	Gnathocharax steindachneri		5 cm (2.0 in)					
Black phantom tetra	Hyphessobrycon megalopterus		3.6 cm (1.4 in)	The black phantom tetra enjoy being in groups of 6 or more and a slightly shaded tank. Males may claim small territories and occasionally minor battles may occur. The Phantom tetra goes well with other tetras of similar size. They also prefer floating plants.				
Black neon tetra	Hyphessobrycon herbertaxelrodi		3.2 cm (1.3 in)					
Black tetra, skirt tetra	Gymnocorymbus ternetzi		5 cm (2.0 in)	A highly spirited fish that may occasionally chase its own species as well as harass slow moving fish with long fins. This fish is very hardy and can stand a variety of water qualities. Disease is not a big problem with the black tetra. The black tetra is also known as the black skirt tetra. The female black tetra is more robust and larger than the male.				
Black morpho tetra	Poecilocharax weitzmani		4 cm (1.6 in)					
Bleeding heart tetra	Hyphessobrycon erythrostigma		6.5 cm (2.6 in)	The bleeding heart tetra is distinguished by the small red spot on both sides of the fish. This fish is very prone to diseases, and can grow larger than most tetra species.				
Bloodfin tetra	Aphyocharax anisitsi		5 cm (2.0 in)					
Blue tetra	Knodus borki		5 cm (2.0 in)					
Blueberry tetra	Hyphessobrycon wadai		3.5 cm (1.4 in)					
	Brittanichthys axelrodi		3 cm (1.2 in)					
Bucktooth tetra	Exodon paradoxus		5 cm (2.0 in)					
Buenos Aires tetra	Hyphessobrycon anisitsi		7.5 cm (3.0 in)					
Cardinal tetra	Paracheirodon axelrodi		5 cm (2.0 in)	Similar to the Neon Tetra, but slightly larger and doesn't prefer to school as much. They need much larger tanks, although their temperament is similar.				
Cave tetra, blind tetra	Astyanax mexicanus		12 cm (4.7 in)	The cave tetra is the blind cave form of the Mexican tetra. This tetra prefers low to moderate lighting.				
Cochu's blue tetra	Boehlkea fredcochui		6 cm (2.4 in)					
Colombian tetra	Hyphessobrycon columbianus		6.5 cm (2.6 in)					
Diamond tetra	Moenkhausia pittieri		6 cm (2.4 in)					
Dawn tetra	Aphyocharax paraguayensis		3.5 cm (1.4 in)					
Ember tetra	Hyphessobrycon amandae		2 cm (0.79 in)	Ember tetras have been known to live ten years or more. May become stressed by the presence of larger fish.	50 liters (13 U.S. gal)	24–28 °C (75–82 °F)	5 - 7 pH	
Emperor tetra	Nematobrycon palmeri		5 cm (2.0 in)					
Flame tetra	Hyphessobrycon flammeus		2.5 cm (0.98 in)					
Flame-back Bleeding heart tetra	Hyphessobrycon pyrrhonotus		4.5 cm (1.8 in)					
Garnet tetra, pretty tetra	Hemigrammus pulcher		6.5 cm (2.6 in)					
Glass bloodfin tetra	Prionobrama filigera		6 cm (2.4 in)					
Glowlight tetra	Hemigrammus erythrozonus		3.75 cm (1.48 in)					
Golden pristella tetra	Pristella maxillaris		5 cm (2.0 in)					
Green neon tetra	Paracheirodon simulans		2.5 cm (0.98 in)	Similar to Neon Tetras and Cardinal Tetras, they are the same to Neon Tetras beside having a green tiny near their top dorsal fin				
Head and tail light tetra	Hemigrammus ocellifer		4 cm (1.6 in)					
Hummingbird tetra	Trochilocharax ornatus		2 cm (0.79 in)					
January tetra	Hemigrammus hyanuary		4 cm (1.6 in)					
Lemon tetra	Hyphessobrycon pulchripinnis		5 cm (2.0 in)					
Neon tetra	Paracheirodon innesi		3.75 cm (1.48 in)	Neon tetras must be kept in groups of at least a half-dozen, as they are a shoaling species. With peaceful dispositions, they are also able to be kept with other species of non-aggressive fish.	38 L (10 gal)	68 to 79 F (20 to 26 C)	6.0–7.0	
Ornate tetra	Hyphessobrycon bentosi		4.5 cm (1.8 in)					
Penguin tetra, blackline penguinfish	Thayeria boehlkei		6.5 cm (2.6 in)					
Peruvian tetra	Hyphessobrycon peruvianus		4 cm (1.6 in)					
Rainbow tetra	Nematobrycon lacortei		4 cm (1.6 in)					
Red and Blue Peru tetra	Hyphessobrycon margitae		4 cm (1.6 in)					
Red eye tetra Lamp eye tetra	Moenkhausia sanctaefilomenae		4 cm (1.6 in)					
Red-line lizard tetra	Iguanodectes geisleri		5.5 cm (2.2 in)					
Red phantom tetra	Hyphessobrycon sweglesi		4.5 cm (1.8 in)					
Redflank bloodfin	Aphyocharax rathbuni		4.5 cm (1.8 in)					
Rosy tetra	Hyphessobrycon rosaceus		4 cm (1.6 in)					
Royal tetra	Inpaichthys kerri		3.5 cm (1.4 in)	Possesses an adipose fin allowing it to be differentiated from the Emperor tetra				
Ruby tetra	Axelrodia riesei		2 cm (0.79 in)					
Rummy-nose tetra	Hemigrammus rhodostomus		5 cm (2.0 in)	This common name is used for three different species of schooling fish with similar patterns: Hemigrammus rhodostomus, Hemigrammus bleheri, and Petitella georgiae.				
False rummy-nose tetra	Petitella georgiae		5 cm (2.0 in)	This common name is used for three different species of schooling fish with similar patterns: Hemigrammus rhodostomus, Hemigrammus bleheri, and Petitella georgiae.				
Splash tetra	Copella arnoldi		5.5 cm (2.2 in)					
Spotted splashing tetra	Copella meinkeni		4.5 cm (1.8 in)					
	Pyrrhulina spilota		7 cm (2.8 in)					
Serpae tetra	Hyphessobrycon serpae		4.5 cm (1.8 in)					
Silvertip tetra	Hasemania nana		3 cm (1.2 in)					
	Tucanoichthys tucano		2 cm (0.79 in)					
X-ray tetra	Pristella maxillaris		4.5 cm (1.8 in)	Also just called the X-ray fish.				
Yellow phantom tetra	Hyphessobrycon roseus		2 cm (0.79 in)					
African moon tetra	Bathyaethiops caudomaculatus		8 cm (3.1 in)					
Congo tetra	Phenacogrammus interruptus		7.5 cm (3.0 in)	Peaceful but may scare shy species with its active swimming and large adult size. Recommended for most community tanks however. Do not keep Congo tetras with fin-nipping species as the spectacular fins of the males will be destroyed.	108 L (28.5 gal)	73-82 °F (23-28 °C)	6.0-7.5	
	Phenacogrammus aurantiacus		10 cm (3.9 in)					
Jellybean tetra	Ladigesia roloffi		3 cm (1.2 in)					
Long-fin tetra	Brycinus longipinnis		12.5 cm (4.9 in)					
Niger tetra	Arnoldichthys spilopterus		10 cm (3.9 in)					
	Alestopetersius brichardi		8 cm (3.1 in)					
Yellow-tailed Congo tetra	Alestopetersius caudalis		6 cm (2.4 in)					

==== Hatchetfish ====
Common name	Scientific name	Image	Size	Remarks	Tank size	Temperature range	pH range	Water Hardness
Common hatchetfish	Gasteropelecus sternicla		4 cm (1.6 in)	Requires a varied diet including fruit flies				
Marbled hatchetfish	Carnegiella strigata		5 cm (2.0 in)	Requires a varied diet including fruit flies				
Black-winged hatchetfish	Carnegiella marthae		4 cm (1.6 in)					
Pygmy hatchetfish	Carnegiella myersi		2.2 cm (0.87 in)					

==== Pencil fishes ====
Common name	Scientific name	Image	Size	Remarks	Tank size	Temperature range	pH range	Water Hardness
Golden pencilfish	Nannostomus beckfordi		6 cm (2.4 in)					
Hockeystick pencilfish	Nannostomus eques		3.5 cm (1.4 in)					
Barred pencilfish	Nannostomus espei		3 cm (1.2 in)					
Dwarf pencilfish	Nannostomus marginatus		2.5 cm (0.98 in)					
Coral-red pencilfish	Nannostomus mortenthaleri		3 cm (1.2 in)					
	Nannostomus nigrotaeniatus		3 cm (1.2 in)					
Three-lined pencilfish	Nannostomus trifasciatus		3 cm (1.2 in)					
One-lined Pencilfish	Nannostomus unifasciatus		4 cm (1.6 in)					

==== Serrasalminae (pacus, piranhas, and silver dollars) ====
Common name	Scientific name	Image	Size	Remarks	Tank size	Temperature range	pH range	Water Hardness
Silver dollar	Metynnis argenteus		15 cm (5.9 in)	The name "silver dollar" may also refer to Metynnis hypsauchen, Metynnis maculatus, or other related fishes.				
Schreitmuller's metynnis	Metynnis hypsauchen		14 cm (5.5 in)					
Spotted silver dollar	Metynnis lippincottianus		13 cm (5.1 in)					
Red-bellied pacu	Colossoma bidens		120 cm (47 in)			78–82 °F (26–28 °C)		
Red piranha	Pygocentrus nattereri		33 cm (13 in)					
Redeye piranha, black piranha	Serrasalmus rhombeus		41.5 cm (16.3 in)					
Wimple piranha	Catoprion mento		15 cm (5.9 in)					
	Mylossoma aureum		30 cm (12 in)					
Disk tetra	Myleus schomburgkii		40 cm (16 in)			23 °C to 27 °C	5.0–7.0	

==== Other Characins ====
Common name	Scientific name	Image	Size	Remarks	Tank size	Temperature range	pH range	Water Hardness
African pike characin	Hepsetus odoe		44 cm (17 in)					
Goliath tigerfish	Hydrocynus goliath		133 cm (52 in)					
Spotted pike-characin	Boulengerella maculata		32 cm (13 in)					
Hujeta gar	Ctenolucius hujeta		25 cm (9.8 in)					
Slender hemiodus	Hemiodus gracilis		16 cm (6.3 in)					
Kissing prochilodus, flagtail Prochilodus	Semaprochilodus insignis		27.5 cm (10.8 in)					
Marbled headstander	Abramites hypselonotus		14 cm (5.5 in)					
Banded leporinus	Leporinus fasciatus		27 cm (11 in)					
Striped headstander	Anostomus anostomus		16 cm (6.3 in)					
	Synaptolaemus latofasciatus		11 cm (4.3 in)					
Siver distichodus	Distichodus affinis		20 cm (7.9 in)					
Six-banded distichodus	Distichodus sexfasciatus		75 cm (30 in)					
	Neolebias ansorgii		3.5 cm (1.4 in)					
Payara	Hydrolycus scomberoides		117 cm (46 in)					
Pink-tail chalceus	Chalceus macrolepidotus		25 cm (9.8 in)					
Red wolf fish	Erythrinus erythrinus		20 cm (7.9 in)					
Red tail barracuda	Acestrorhynchus falcatus		30 cm (12 in)					
Spotted headstander	Chilodus punctatus		8 cm (3.1 in)					

=== Knifefish and electric eels (Gymnotiformes) ===
Common name	Scientific name	Image	Size	Remarks	Tank size	Temperature range	pH range	Water hardness
Black ghost knifefish	Apteronotus albifrons		50 cm (19.5 in)	Not to be confused with the featherback "knifefish" of the Bonytongue group (see above)		23-28C (73-82F)	6.0-8.0	
Brown ghost knifefish	Apteronotus leptorhynchus		27 cm (10.5 in)					
Glass knifefish	Eigenmannia virescens		44 cm (17.5 in)					
Electric eel	Electrophorus electricus		200 cm (78.5 in)					

=== Catfish (Siluriformes) ===
==== Armored catfish including Aspidoras, Brochis, Callichthys, and Corydoras ====
Common name	Scientific name	Image	Size	Remarks	Tank size	Temperature range	pH range	Water hardness
Brown-Point Shield Skin	Aspidoras fuscoguttatus		3.8 cm (1.5 in)		30 Gallons	22–25 °C (72–77 °F)	5.5–6.8	
Aspidoras Cory-Cat Pygmy Aspidoras	Aspidoras lakoi		4 cm (1.6 in)		28 Gallons	22–25 °C (72–77 °F)	6.5-7.5	
Sixray corydoras, false corydoras	Aspidoras pauciradiatus		2.9 cm (1.1 in)		20 Gallons	73–82 °F (23–28 °C)	6.0-7.2	
Loach catfish	Aspidoras rochai		4 cm (1.6 in) maximum length		20 Gallons	21–25 °C	6.0-7.5	
Britski's catfish	Corydoras britskii		8.9 cm (3.5 in)			20–24 °C (68–75 °F)	6.5-7.2	
Hognosed brochis	Corydoras multiradiatus		6.6 cm (2.6 in)			70–75 °F (21–24 °C)	6.0–7.2	
Emerald catfish	Corydoras splendens		10 cm (3.9 in)	The Emerald Cory Catfish is a very hardy and resilient fish. Disease should not be a concern provided that you maintain the aquarium to standards.	20 Gallons	72 – 82 F (22 – 27.7 C)	5.8-8.0	
Cascarudo	Callichthys callichthys		20 cm (7.9 in)			64–83 °F (18–28 °C).	5.8–8.3	
Blacktop corydoras	Corydoras acutus		4.4 cm (1.7 in)			22–28 °C	6.0–7.5	
Adolfo's catfish/corydoras	Corydoras adolfoi		5.7 cm (2.2 in)			72–79 °F (22–26 °C)	6.0–7.0	
Bronze corydoras, Emerald green cory	Corydoras aeneus		6.35 cm (2.50 in)			77 to 82 °F (25 to 28 °C)	6.0–8.0	
Agassiz's corydoras	Corydoras agassizii		5 cm (2 in)			22–26 °C	6.0-8.0	
Spotted corydoras, longnose corydoras	Corydoras ambiacus		5.1–6.1 cm (2.0–2.4 in)		27 gal	22–25 °C	6.5–7.2	71.43 - 392.86ppm
Caracha Fairy Cory	Corydoras atropersonatus		4.5 cm (1.8 in)		20 gal	21–27 °C	5.0–7.0	36 – 179 ppm
Pink corydoras Axelrod's Cory	Corydoras axelrodi		4–5 cm (1.5–2 in)		21 gal	22–26 °C	6.0–8.0	
Masked corydoras, bandit corydoras	Corydoras metae		4.8 cm (1.9 in)			72–79 °F (22–26 °C)	6.0-7.0	
Blackstripe corydoras	Corydoras bondi		4.7 cm (1.9 in)			20–26 °C	6.0–7.5	
Tailspot corydoras	Corydoras caudimaculatus		4–5 cm (1.5–2 in)			20–26 °C	6.0–7.0	36 – 179 ppm
Barred-tail corydoras	Corydoras cochui		2.5 cm (0.98 in)			70–75 °F	6.0 – 7.0	
False blochi catfish	Corydoras delphax		5 cm (2 in)			22–27 °C	5.5–7.5	36 – 215 ppm
Ehrhardt's corydoras	Corydoras ehrhardti		4.1 cm (1.6 in)			18-23 °C	6.5–7.5	
Elegant corydoras	Corydoras elegans		5.1 cm (2.0 in)					
Horseman's cory	Corydoras eques		5 cm (2 in)					
Evelyn's cory	Corydoras evelynae		4 cm (1.6 in)			22–26 °C	6.0-8.0	
Geoffrey's Corydora	Corydoras geoffroy		7 cm (2.8 in)			22–26 °C	6.0-8.0	
Skunk corydoras	Corydoras granti		5.5 cm (2.2 in)					
Guapore corydoras	Corydoras guapore		4.1 cm (1.6 in)					
Salt and pepper catfish/corydoras	Corydoras habrosus		2.5–3.6 cm (0.98–1.42 in)					
Mosaic corydoras, reticulated corydoras	Corydoras haraldschultzi		5.9 cm (2.3 in)					
Dwarf corydoras	Corydoras hastatus		3.5 cm (1.4 in)					
Julii corydoras	Corydoras julii		5.1–6.4 cm (2.0–2.5 in)					
	Corydoras latus		5.2 cm (2.0 in)			22–26 °C	6.0-8.0	
False spotted catfish	Corydoras leucomelas		4.5 cm (1.8 in)					
Loxozonus cory	Corydoras loxozonus		4.9 cm (1.9 in)			21-24 °C	6.0-7.2	
Bluespotted corydoras spotted cory	Corydoras melanistius		5.1 cm (2.0 in)			22–26 °C	6.0-7.0	
Gold laser cory	Corydoras melanotaenia		5.8 cm (2.3 in)					
Long nosed arched cory Long-nosed Skunk Cory	Corydoras narcissus		6.5 cm (2.6 in)			23-45 °C	6.0-7.0	
Blue corydoras Natterer's Cory	Corydoras nattereri		5.4 cm (2.1 in)			20-23 °C	6.0-7.6	
	Corydoras ornatus		4.9 cm (1.9 in)			22–26 °C	6.0-7.2	
	Corydoras osteocarus		4 cm (1.6 in)					
Peppered corydoras, salt and pepper catfish	Corydoras paleatus		5.1–7.6 cm (2.0–3.0 in)					
Panda corydoras	Corydoras panda		3.8–5.1 cm (1.5–2.0 in)				6.0-8.0	
Pastaza corydoras	Corydoras pastazensis		6.4–7.1 cm (2.5–2.8 in)					
	Corydoras polystictus		3.2 cm (1.3 in)					
Pygmy corydoras	Corydoras pygmaeus		2.5–3.3 cm (0.98–1.30 in)	A very peaceful species, that does not make an ideal community fish due to its small adult size. It is easily intimidated by larger tank mates and will not compete well with them for food.	42.4 L (11 gal)	72 to 79 °F (22 to 26 °C)	6.4 to 7.4	
Rust corydoras	Corydoras rabauti		5 cm (2 in)					
Mosaic corydoras, reticulated corydoras	Corydoras reticulatus		5.1–6.1 cm (2.0–2.4 in)					
Banner-tail corydoras, flagtail corydoras	Corydoras robineae		4.4 cm (1.7 in)					
Schwartz's catfish	Corydoras schwartzi		3.8–5.1 cm (1.5–2.0 in)					
	Corydoras semiaquilus		6.0 cm (2.4 in)					
	Corydoras septentrionalis		4.9 cm (1.9 in)					
	Corydoras simulatus		4.9 cm (1.9 in)					
False network catfish	Corydoras sodalis		4.9 cm (1.9 in)					
Sterba's corydoras	Corydoras sterbai		6.8 cm (2.7 in)					
Sychr's catfish	Corydoras sychri		4.3 cm (1.7 in)					
Threestripe corydoras, leopard catfish, false julii cory	Corydoras trilineatus		6.1 cm (2.4 in)					
	Corydoras undulatus		4.4 cm (1.7 in)					
Xingu corydoras	Corydoras xinguensis		3.8–5.1 cm (1.5–2.0 in)					
Corydoras nain	Corydoras nanus		4.5 cm (1.8 in)			22–26 °C	6.0-8.0	
Flagtail catfish	Dianema urostriatum		12.5 cm (4.9 in)			77–82 °F (25–28 °C)	6.0-8.0	
Spotted hoplo	Megalechis thoracata		15 cm (5.9 in)			64–83 °F (18–28 °C).	6-8	
	Scleromystax prionotos		5.3 cm (2.1 in)					
Sailfin corydoras	Scleromystax macropterus		8.7 cm (3.4 in)				6.0 – 8.0	
Banded corydoras	Scleromystax barbatus		10 cm (3.9 in)			68-82 °F (20-28 °C)	6.0-8.0	

==== Armored suckermouth catfish (plecos, oto, and whiptail) ====
Common name	Scientific name	Image	Size	Remarks	Tank size	Temperature range	pH range	Water Hardness
Bristlenose pleco, bushynose pleco	Ancistrus spp.			The bristlenose genus has at least 59 identified species and many others yet to be named. Males and female both have long "bristles" on their nose, the males having distinctly longer ones.		72-84 F (20-27 C)		
Adonis pleco, polka dot lyre-tail pleco	Acanthicus adonis		100 cm (39 in)			77-86 F (25-30 C)		
	Ancistomus spp.							
Gold nugget pleco	Baryancistrus spp.			further information on species variation, L-Numbers, and naming at page for Baryancistrus genus		77-86 F (25-30 C)		
	Dekeyseria spp.							
	Hemiancistrus spp.							
Zebra pleco	Hypancistrus spp.							
	Hypostomus spp.					72-86 F (22-30 C)	6.5-7.5	
	Lasiancistrus spp.							
	Leporacanthicus spp.							
Panaque	Panaque spp.							
	Panaqolus spp.			genus includes popular aquarium species such as the Clown Pleco, Panaqolus maccus	20 gal	23.0-28.0 °C or 73.4-82.4 °F	6.8 - 7.6	
	Peckoltia spp.							
	Pseudacanthicus spp.							
Pineapple pleco, orange cheek pleco	Pseudorinelepis genibarbis		36 cm (14 in)					
Sunshine pleco	Scobinancistrus aureatus		25 cm (9.8 in)					
Whiptail catfish	Rineloricaria spp.			It is a peaceful fish that is best kept in good sized groups (6+) in a mature tank with plenty of shady hiding spots amongst plants, driftwood, slate caves, and PVC pipes.		75-82 F (24-28 C)	6.0-7.2	
Twig catfish	Farlowella spp.							
	Sturisomatichthys spp.							
	Hypoptopoma spp.							
Golden dwarf sucker, golden oto	Otocinclus macrospilus		3.5 cm (1.4 in)					
Zebra dwarf sucker, zebra oto	Otocinclus cocama		4.5 cm (1.8 in)					

==== Long-whiskered catfish ====
Common name	Scientific name	Image	Size	Remarks	Tank size	Temperature range	pH range	Water Hardness
Bolt catfish	Aguarunichthys torosus		35 cm (14 in)					
Gold Zebra catfish	Brachyplatystoma juruense		60 cm (24 in)					
Zebra shovelnose	Brachyplatystoma tigrinum		60 cm (24 in)					
Vulture Catfish, zamurito	Calophysus macropterus		40 cm (16 in)					
	Leiarius marmoratus		100 cm (39 in)					
	Leiarius pictus		60 cm (24 in)					
Redtail catfish	Phractocephalus hemioliopterus		120 cm (47 in)		Needs at least a 2,600 US gallons (9,800 L) tank when mature, even though this does not provide them with the space to show their natural behaviour.	70–79 °F (21–26 °C)	6.0–7.5	
Spotted pimelodus, pictus, pictus catfish	Pimelodus pictus		30 cm (12 in)					
Sturgeon catfish	Platystomatichthys sturio		40 cm (16 in)					
Barred sorubim	Pseudoplatystoma fasciatum		104 cm (41 in)					
Tiger sorubim	Pseudoplatystoma tigrinum		130 cm (51 in)					
Firewood catfish, (planiceps) shovelnose catfish	Sorubimichthys planiceps		178 cm (70 in)					
Lima shovelnose catfish	Sorubim lima		40 cm (16 in)					

==== Squeakers and upside-down catfish ====
Common name	Scientific name	Image	Size	Remarks	Tank size	Temperature range	pH range	Water Hardness
Brichard's syno	Synodontis brichardi		15 cm (5.9 in)					
Cuckoo squeaker	Synodontis multipunctatus		27.5 cm (10.8 in)					
Clown squeaker	Synodontis decorus		32 cm (13 in)					
Even-spotted squeaker, dwarf lake syno, false cuckoo syno	Synodontis petricola		10 cm (3.9 in)					
Featherfin squeaker	Synodontis eupterus		30 cm (12 in)					
Malawi squeaker	Synodontis njassae		19 cm (7.5 in)					
Polka dot squeaker, angel squeaker	Synodontis angelicus		55 cm (22 in)					
Orangestriped squeaker, pyjama syno	Synodontis flavitaeniata		19.5 cm (7.7 in)					
Upside-down catfish	Synodontis nigriventris		9.6 cm (3.8 in)	S. nigriventris prefers bottom feeding on Tubifex (or similar worms), but its main diet consists of algae. The blotched upside-down catfish is well suited to aquariums because of its small size (typically 9 or 10 cm or less) and peaceful demeanor.		72–82 °F (22–28 °C)	6.0 - 7.5	
Yellow marbled syno, vermiculated syno	Synodontis schoutedeni		17 cm (6.7 in)					

==== Other catfish ====
Common name	Scientific name	Image	Size	Remarks	Tank size	Temperature range	pH range	Water Hardness
Three-striped African catfish	Pareutropius buffei		11.5 cm (4.5 in)					
Giraffe catfish	Auchenoglanis occidentalis		70 cm (28 in)					
Electric catfish	Malapterurus electricus		122 cm (48 in)					
Eel catfish	Channallabes apus		33 cm (13 in)					
Black lancer catfish	Bagrichthys macracanthus		25 cm (9.8 in)					
Harlequin lancer catfish	Bagroides melapterus		30 cm (12 in)					
Crystal-eyed catfish	Hemibagrus wyckii		71 cm (28 in)					
Shadow catfish	Hyalobagrus flavus		4.5 cm (1.8 in)					
	Mystus bimaculatus		6.5 cm (2.6 in)					
Dwarf bumblebee catfish	Pseudomystus leiacanthus		6 cm (2.4 in)					
	Pseudeutropius moolenburghae		10 cm (3.9 in)					
Glass catfish	Kryptopterus vitreolus		8 cm (3.1 in).					
Striped glass catfish	Kryptopterus macrocephalus		10 cm (3.9 in).					
Goonch	Bagarius lica		200 cm (79 in)					
Chocolate frogmouth catfish	Chaca bankanensis		20 cm (7.9 in)					
Asian banjo catfish	Acrochordonichthys rugosus		11 cm (4.3 in)					
Walking catfish	Clarias batrachus		50 cm (19.5 in)	The albino form is common in the aquarium trade. This fish can survive out of the water and "walk" as long as kept wet, for a very long time.				
Black catfish, Narrowfront tandan	Neosilurus ater		47 cm (19 in)					
Stinging catfish	Heteropneustes fossilis		30 cm (12 in)					
Sun catfish	Horabagrus brachysoma		45 cm (18 in)					
Asian redtail catfish	Hemibagrus wyckioides		130 cm (51 in)					
Asian upside down catfish	Mystus leucophasis		30 cm (12 in)					
Asian bumblebee catfish	Pseudomystus siamensis		15 cm (5.9 in)					
Indawgyi stream catfish	Akysis prashadi		6 cm (2.4 in)					
Asian stone catfish	Hara jerdoni		4 cm (1.6 in)					
Iridescent shark	Pangasianodon hypophthalmus		130 cm (51 in)					
Chao Phraya giant shark, giant pangasius	Pangasius sanitwongsei		300 cm (120 in)					
Colombian shark catfish	Ariopsis seemanni		35 cm (14 in)					
Blue whale catfish	Cetopsis coecutiens		27 cm (11 in)					
Banjo catfish	Bunocephalus coracoideus		14 cm (5.5 in)					
Giant raphael catfish	Megalodoras uranoscopus		60 cm (24 in)					
Ripsaw catfish	Oxydoras niger		90 cm (35 in)					
Striped raphael catfish	Platydoras armatulus		43 cm (17 in)					
Spotted raphael catfish	Agamyxis pectinifrons		15 cm (5.9 in)					
Bottlenose catfish	Ageneiosus inermis		18.5 cm (7.3 in)					
Gulper catfish	Asterophysus batrachus		25 cm (9.8 in)					
Midnight catfish	Auchenipterichthys coracoideus		10 cm (3.9 in)					
Oil catfish	Duringlanis perugiae		5 cm (2.0 in)					
Jaguar catfish	Liosomadoras oncinus		17 cm (6.7 in)					
	Tatia intermedia		12 cm (4.7 in)					
Pygmy driftwood catfish	Trachelyichthys exilis		8 cm (3.1 in)					
	Trachelyopterus fisheri		28 cm (11 in)					

== Cichlids ==
Lake Malawi cichlids

Common name	Scientific name	Image	Size	Remarks	Tank size	Temperature range	pH range	Water Hardness
Sunshine peacock cichlid	Aulonocara baenschi		13 cm (5.1 in)					
Red shoulder peacock	Aulonocara hansbaenschi		8.5 cm (3.3 in)					
Eureka red peacock	Aulonocara jacobfreibergi		15 cm (5.9 in)					
Aulonocara chizumulu	Aulonocara korneliae		8 cm (3.1 in)					
Pale Usisya aulonocara	Aulonocara steveni		9 cm (3.5 in)					
Flavescent peacock	Aulonocara stuartgranti		12 cm (4.7 in)					
Spilo	Champsochromis spilorhynchus		40 cm (16 in)					
	Copadichromis azureus		14.5 cm (5.7 in)					
Red fin hap	Copadichromis borleyi		14 cm (5.5 in)					
Blue dolphin cichlid, lumphead cichlid	Cyrtocara moorii		25 cm (9.8 in)					
Afra cichlid, dogtooth cichild	Cynotilapia afra		10 cm (3.9 in)					
Malawi eyebiter	Dimidiochromis compressiceps		23 cm (9.1 in)					
Rusty cichlid, lavender cichild	Iodotropheus sprengerae		10 cm (3.9 in)					
Electric yellow cichlid	Labidochromis caeruleus		20 cm (7.9 in)					
Fuelleborn's cichlid, Blue mbuna	Labeotropheus fuelleborni		18 cm (7.1 in)					
Scrapermouth mbuna	Labeotropheus trewavasae		12 cm (4.7 in)					
Hongi, Red-top kimpumpa	Labidochromis sp. "Hongi"		13 cm (5.1 in)					
Yellow Top Mbamba	Labidochromis sp. "Mbamba Bay"		13 cm (5.1 in)					
Aurora	Maylandia aurora		9 cm (3.5 in)					
Cobalt blue cichlid, cobalt zebra cichlid	Maylandia callainos		10 cm (3.9 in)					
Red zebra cichlid	Maylandia estherae		8 cm (3.1 in)					
Kenyi cichlid	Maylandia lombardoi		13 cm (5.1 in)					
Zebra mbuna	Maylandia zebra		11 cm (4.3 in)					
Auratus cichlid, Malawi golden cichlid	Melanochromis auratus		10 cm (3.9 in)					
Chipokee cichlid	Melanochromis chipokae		12 cm (4.7 in)					
Blue johanni cichlid, Maingano	Melanochromis cyaneorhabdos		10 cm (3.9 in)					
Pearl of Likoma	Melanochromis joanjohnsonae		10 cm (3.9 in)					
Fusco	Nimbochromis fuscotaeniatus		25 cm (9.8 in)					
Livingston's cichlid	Nimbochromis livingstonii		25 cm (9.8 in)					
Kaligono	Nimbochromis polystigma		30 cm (12 in)					
Venustus cichlid, giraffe cichild	Nimbochromis venustus		25 cm (9.8 in)					
Deep-water hap	Placidochromis electra		12 cm (4.7 in)					
Fenestratus	Protomelas fenestratus		14 cm (5.5 in)					
Red empress cichlid	Protomelas taeniolatus		15 cm (5.9 in)					
Yellow-tail acei	Pseudotropheus sp. "acei"		10 cm (3.9 in)					
Bumblebee cichlid, hornet cichlid	Pseudotropheus crabro		15 cm (5.9 in)					
Dwarf Mbuna	Pseudotropheus demasoni		10 cm (3.9 in)					
Johanni cichlid	Pseudotropheus johannii		10 cm (3.9 in)					
Saulosi	Pseudotropheus saulosi		7.5 cm (3.0 in)					
Pindani	Chindongo socolofi		7 cm (2.8 in)					
Malawi barracuda	Rhamphochromis macrophthalmus		30 cm (12 in)	academic sources disagree on whether same as Rhamphochromis longiceps - one of several unrelated fish commonly called the "Tigerfish"				
Electric blue cichlid	Sciaenochromis fryeri		11.5 cm (4.5 in)					
Big-mouth hap	Tyrannochromis macrostoma		38 cm (15 in)					

Lake Tanganyika cichlids

Common name	Scientific name	Image	Size	Remarks	Tank size	Temperature range	pH range	Water Hardness
Calvus	Altolamprologus calvus		14 cm (5.5 in)					
Compressiceps	Altolamprologus compressiceps		12 cm (4.7 in)					
	Benthochromis tricoti		16.5 cm (6.5 in)					
	Boulengerochromis microlepis		90 cm (35 in)					
	Callochromis pleurospilus		10 cm (3.9 in)					
	Chalinochromis brichardi		12 cm (4.7 in)					
	Cyathopharynx furcifer		21 cm (8.3 in)					
Frontosa cichild	Cyphotilapia frontosa		40 cm (16 in)	Ongoing academic discussion currently specifies C. frontosa as Cyphotilapia from the northern half of Lake Tanganyika, while C. gibberosa are those from the south. Further tentative species are under review.				
Frontosa cichild	Cyphotilapia gibberosa		40 cm (16 in)	Since the relatively recent discovery of C. gibberosa (2003), the name "Frontosa Cichlid" has been applied by some to both members of the genus. Whether this trend will continue, or C. gibberosa will be given its own common name remains to be seen.				
Herring cichlid, sardine cichlid	Cyprichromis leptosoma		11 cm (4.3 in)					
Descamp's strange-tooth cichlid	Ectodus descampsii		10.5 cm (4.1 in)					
Brown julie	Julidochromis dickfeldi		11 cm (4.3 in)					
Marlier's julie	Julidochromis marlieri		15 cm (5.9 in) fem / 10 cm (3.9 in) male					
Golden julie	Julidochromis ornatus		8.5 cm (3.3 in)					
Convict julie	Julidochromis regani		15 cm (5.9 in) fem / 10 cm (3.9 in) male					
Masked julie	Julidochromis transcriptus		10 cm (3.9 in)					
	Lamprologus ocellatus		6 cm (2.4 in)					
	Lamprologus signatus		5.5 cm (2.2 in)					
	Neolamprologus brevis		6 cm (2.4 in)					
Lyretail cichlid, fairy cichlid	Neolamprologus brichardi		10 cm (3.9 in)					
Lemon cichlid	Neolamprologus leleupi		11.5 cm (4.5 in)					
	Neolamprologus multifasciatus		3.8 cm (1.5 in)					
	Neolamprologus similis		3.8 cm (1.5 in)	A small shell-dwelling cichlid from Lake Tanganyika. Very similar to N. multifsciatus but similis has striping from the body continue to the head				
Five-barred lamprologus	Neolamprologus tretocephalus		15 cm (5.9 in)					
Featherfin	Ophthalmotilapia ventralis		15 cm (5.9 in)					
	Petrochromis trewavasae		20 cm (7.9 in)					
	Simochromis pleurospilus		10 cm (3.9 in)					
	Tropheus duboisi		13 cm (5.1 in)					
	Tropheus moorii		14 cm (5.5 in)					
	Tropheus polli		14 cm (5.5 in)					
	Variabilichromis moorii		10 cm (3.9 in)					
Yellow sand cichlid	Xenotilapia flavipinnis		9 cm (3.5 in)					

Lake Victoria cichlids

Common name	Scientific name	Image	Size	Remarks	Tank size	Temperature range	pH range	Water Hardness
Allauad's haplo	Astatoreochromis alluaudi		19 cm (7.5 in)					
	Haplochromis aeneocolor		7.5 cm (3.0 in)					
Zebra obliquidens	Haplochromis latifasciatus		11 cm (4.3 in)					
Flameback	Haplochromis nyererei		8 cm (3.1 in)					
	Haplochromis thereuterion		8 cm (3.1 in)					
Hippo Point Salmon	Ptyochromis sp. "Hippo Point Salmon"		14 cm (5.5 in)					

Miscellaneous African cichlids (non-Rift Lake)

Common name	Scientific name	Image	Size	Remarks	Tank size	Temperature range	pH range	Water Hardness
African butterfly cichlid	Anomalochromis thomasi		5 cm (2.0 in)					
Dwarf Egyptian mouthbrooder	Pseudocrenilabrus multicolor		8 cm (3.1 in)					
Guenther's mouthbrooder	Chromidotilapia guntheri		10 cm (3.9 in)					
Jewel cichlid, two-spotted jewel cichlid	Rubricatochromis bimaculatus		14 cm (5.5 in)					
Lifalili jewel cichlid, blood-red jewel cichlid	Rubricatochromis lifalili		8 cm (3.1 in)					
Ocellated kribensis	Pelvicachromis subocellatus		5 cm (2.0 in)					
Rainbow krib	Pelvicachromis pulcher		11 cm (4.3 in)					
Striped kribensis	Pelvicachromis taeniatus		7 cm (2.8 in)					
Yellow kribensis	Wallaceochromis humilis		12.5 cm (4.9 in)					
Lionhead cichlid	Steatocranus casuarius		10 cm (3.9 in)					
	Nanochromis parilus		4.5 cm (1.8 in)					

Central American cichlids

Common name	Scientific name	Image	Size	Remarks	Tank size	Temperature range	pH range	Water Hardness
Bay snook	Petenia splendida		50 cm (20 in)					
Blackbelt cichlid	Vieja maculicauda		25 cm (9.8 in)					
Convict cichlid	Amatitlania nigrofasciata		10 cm (3.9 in)					
	Amatitlania myrnae		8 cm (3.1 in)					
Firemouth cichlid	Thorichthys meeki		17 cm (6.7 in)					
Jack Dempsey cichlid	Rocio octofasciata		25 cm (9.8 in)					
Jaguar cichlid, managuense cichlid	Parachromis managuensis		55 cm (22 in)					
Mayan cichlid	Mayaheros urophthalmus		39.5 cm (15.6 in)					
Midas cichlid	Amphilophus citrinellus		24.5 cm (9.6 in)	commonly confused with red devil cichlids, but it is an entirely different species				
Nicaraguan cichlid, moga	Hypsophrys nicaraguensis		20 cm (7.9 in)					
Poor man's tropheus	Neetroplus nematopus		14 cm (5.5 in)					
Rainbow cichlid	Herotilapia multispinosa		17 cm (6.7 in)					
Red terror, guayas cichlid	Mesoheros festae		25 cm (9.8 in)					
Salvin's cichlid	Trichromis salvini		22 cm (8.7 in)					
Texas cichlid, Rio Grande cichlid	Herichthys cyanoguttatus		30 cm (12 in)					
T-bar cichlid	Amatitlania sajica		9 cm (3.5 in)					
Wolf cichlid	Parachromis dovii		72 cm (28 in)					
Yellowjacket cichlid	Parachromis friedrichsthalii		28 cm (11 in)					
False yellowjacket cichlid	Parachromis motaguensis		30 cm (12 in)					

South American cichlids

Common name	Scientific name	Image	Size	Remarks	Tank size	Temperature range	pH range	Water Hardness
Blue acara	Andinoacara pulcher		16 cm (6.3 in)					
Thread-finned acara	Acarichthys heckelii		19.5 cm (7.7 in)					
Angelfish	Pterophyllum scalare		15 cm (5.9 in)	In an enclosed tank habitat, the fish's territorial, aggressive nature is heightened, so don't house angelfish with shy species that are intimidated by pushy, boisterous fish.		75–82 °F (25–28 °C)	6.8 – 7	
Altum angelfish	Pterophyllum altum		18 cm (7.1 in)					
Spotted angelfish	Pterophyllum leopoldi		10 cm (3.9 in)					
Chocolate cichlid	Hypselecara temporalis		15 cm (5.9 in)					
Common discus, red discus	Symphysodon discus		12 cm (4.7 in)					
Blue discus, green discus	Symphysodon aequifasciatus		14 cm (5.5 in)					
Eartheater cichlid	Geophagus altifrons		26.5 cm (10.4 in)					
Demon eartheater	Satanoperca jurupari		17 cm (6.7 in)					
Threespot eartheater	Satanoperca daemon		20 cm (7.9 in)					
Flag cichlid	Mesonauta festivus		12 cm (4.7 in)					
Greenstreaked eartheater, cupid cichlid	Biotodoma cupido		12 cm (4.7 in)					
Green terror	Andinoacara rivulatus		20 cm (7.9 in)					
Oscar	Astronotus ocellatus		45 cm (18 in)	Many people that purchase these fish do not realize that the fish could grow to a foot long (30 cm) within a year. Due to their fast growth rate and large size as an adult, they are often kept in aquariums that are too small for them.		72-80 °F (22-27 °C)	6.0-7.5	
Butterfly peacock bass	Cichla ocellaris		74 cm (29 in)					
Orinoco peacock bass	Cichla orinocensis		62 cm (24 in)					
Speckled peacock bass, speckled pavon	Cichla temensis		100 cm (39 in)					
Pearl cichlid	Geophagus brasiliensis		28 cm (11 in)					
Severum	Heros efasciatus		17 cm (6.7 in)					
Uaru, waroo	Uaru amphiacanthoides		25 cm (9.8 in)	Also known as the Triangle Cichlid.				
Zebra Pike Cichlid	Crenicichla zebrina		26.5 cm (10.4 in)					

Dwarf cichlids (apistogrammas, rams and others)

Common name	Scientific name	Image	Size	Remarks	Tank size	Temperature range	pH range	Water Hardness
Agassiz's dwarf cichlid	Apistogramma agassizii		4 cm (1.6 in)					
Umbrella cichlid	Apistogramma borellii		4 cm (1.6 in)					
Cockatoo cichlid	Apistogramma cacatuoides		5 cm (2.0 in)					
	Apistogramma nijsseni		4 cm (1.6 in)			24-28 °C	5.0-6.5	0-72 ppm
Three-striped dwarf ichlid	Apistogramma trifasciata		4 cm (1.6 in)					
Two-striped dwarf cichlid, banded dwarf cichlid	Apistogramma bitaeniata		7.5 cm (3.0 in)					
Keyhole cichlid	Cleithracara maronii		7 cm (2.8 in)					
Lyretail checkerboard cichlid, chessboard cichlid	Dicrossus filamentosus		4 cm (1.6 in)					
Zebra acara	Ivanacara adoketa		5 cm (2.0 in)					
Dwarf flag cichlid	Laetacara curviceps		4.5 cm (1.8 in)					
Blue ram, German ram, ram cichlid German blue ram	Mikrogeophagus ramirezi		3.5 cm (1.4 in)	These small and colorful fish require precise water parameters, and if you don't meet those parameters, your fish could be severely impacted.	10 U.S. gal (38 L)	78 - 85 F (25.5 - 29.4 C)	6.0 – 7.5	
Bolivian ram	Mikrogeophagus altispinosus		5.5 cm (2.2 in)					
Goldeneye cichlid	Nannacara anomala		6 cm (2.4 in)					

Other cichlids

Common name	Scientific name	Image	Size	Remarks	Tank size	Temperature range	pH range	Water Hardness
Canara pearlspot	Etroplus canarensis		11.5 cm (4.5 in)					
Green chromide	Etroplus suratensis		40 cm (16 in)					
Orange chromide	Pseudetroplus maculatus		9.5 cm (3.7 in)					
Pinstripe damba	Paretroplus menarambo		17 cm (6.7 in)					
Blood parrot cichlid	(Amphilophus citrinellus × Vieja melanurus)			Not considered a separate species of cichlid but a hybrid.				
Flowerhorn cichlid	Cichlasoma sp.		25 cm (9.8 in)	Not considered a separate species of cichlid but a hybrid.				

== Cyprinids ==
Barbs

Common name	Scientific name	Image	Size	Remarks	Tank size	Temperature range	pH range	Water Hardness
African banded barb	Enteromius fasciolatus		6 cm (2.4 in)					
African butterfly barb	Enteromius hulstaerti		3.5 cm (1.4 in)					
Jae barb	Enteromius jae		4 cm (1.6 in)					
Arulius barb	Dawkinsia arulius		12 cm (4.7 in)			66 °F to 77 °F (19°-25 °C)	6 – 8	
Bigspot barb, Duncker's barb	Barbodes dunckeri		13 cm (5.1 in)			72 - 85 °F (22 - 29 °C)	6 - 7	
Black ruby barb	Pethia nigrofasciata		6.5 cm (2.6 in)					
Cherry barb	Puntius titteya		4.8 cm (1.9 in)					
Denison's barb, red line torpedo barb	Sahyadria denisonii		15 cm (5.9 in)					
Drape fin barb	Oreichthys crenuchoides		4.5 cm (1.8 in)					
Gold barb	Barbodes semifasciolatus		8 cm (3.1 in)					
Golden barb	Pethia gelius		5 cm (2.0 in)					
Odessa barb	Pethia padamya		8 cm (3.1 in)					
Melon barb	Haludaria fasciata		15 cm (5.9 in)					
Mascara Barb	Dawkinsia assimilis		12 cm (4.7 in)			66 °F to 77 °F (19°-25 °C)	6 – 8	
	Dawkinsia rohani		12 cm (4.7 in)			66 °F to 77 °F (19°-25 °C)	6 – 8	
	Dawkinsia tambraparniei		12 cm (4.7 in)			66 °F to 77 °F (19°-25 °C)	6 – 8	
Narayan barb	Pethia setnai		6 cm (2.4 in)					
Rosy barb	Pethia conchonius		13 cm (5.1 in)					
Sawbwa barb	Sawbwa resplendens		3 cm (1.2 in)					
Tic-tac-toe barb	Pethia stoliczkana		5 cm (2.0 in)					
Spanner barb, t-barb	Barbodes lateristriga		20 cm (7.9 in)					
Fiveband barb, pentazona barb	Desmopuntius hexazona		5 cm (2.0 in)					
Snakeskin barb	Desmopuntius rhomboocellatus		5 cm (2.0 in)					
	Eirmotus octozona		3.6 cm (1.4 in)					
Checker barb	Oliotius oligolepis		5 cm (2.0 in)					
Tiger barb, sumatra barb	Puntigrus tetrazona		7.5 cm (3.0 in)	Keep in shoals of 8 or 10 to prevent aggression				
Tinfoil barb	Barbonymus schwanenfeldii		36 cm (14 in)	Genus of large 'barbs' in some ways more closely related to classic carps				

Other cyprinids

Common name	Scientific name	Image	Size	Remarks	Tank size	Temperature range	pH range	Water Hardness
Giant sword minnow	Macrochirichthys macrochirus		100 cm (39 in)					
Hampala barb	Hampala macrolepidota		70 cm (28 in)					
Mad barb	Leptobarbus hoevenii		100 cm (39 in)					
Bala shark	Balantiocheilus melanopterus		40 cm (16 in)	Grows large, needs lots of swimming room and is a schooling fish so a 125-gallon would be good for 3-4				
Black shark	Labeo chrysophekadion		90 cm (35 in)					
Apollo Shark	Luciosoma setigerum		22 cm (8.7 in)					
Siamese algae eater, fringe barb	Crossocheilus langei		16 cm (6.3 in)	Many other fish in the order Cypriniformes are also sold under this name. Very likely to jump out of the aquarium especially after reaching adult size. Very useful for getting rid of algae when it is young but prefer fish food upon reaching adulthood.				
	Cyclocheilichthys janthochir		20 cm (7.9 in)					
Flying fox (fish)	Epalzeorhynchos kalopterus		16 cm (6.3 in)					
Red-tailed black shark	Epalzeorhynchos bicolor		13 cm (5.1 in)					
Rainbow shark	Epalzeorhynchos frenatum		15 cm (5.9 in)					
Cambodian log sucker, false Siamese algae eater	Ceratogarra cambodgiensis		24 cm (9.4 in)					
Jullien's golden carp	Probarbus jullieni		150 cm (59 in)					
Panda garra	Garra flavatra		6 cm (2.4 in)					
Chinese algae eater	Gyrinocheilus aymonieri		28 cm (11 in)	This species may be sold under a variety of common names, including Siamese algae eater, Chinese algae eater, golden algae eater, or sucking loach. A gold colored form also exists.				

Rasboras

Common name	Scientific name	Image	Size	Remarks	Tank size	Temperature range	pH range	Water Hardness
Harlequin rasbora	Trigonostigma heteromorpha		5 cm (2.0 in)	Also known as Harlequin tetra or Harlequin barb.				
Glowlight rasbora	Trigonostigma hengeli		5 cm (2.0 in)					
Red-striped rasbora	Trigonopoma pauciperforatum		7.5 cm (3.0 in)			22–29 °C (72–84 °F)		
Graceful Rasbora	Trigonopoma gracile		5.5 cm (2.2 in)			22–29 °C (72–84 °F)		
Chili rasbora	Boraras brigittae		2 cm (0.79 in)	Should be kept in acidic water which can be difficult to maintain for most beginners in the aquarium hobby.	5 U.S. gallons (19 L)	20–28 °C (68–82 °F)	5-6	
Dwarf rasbora	Boraras maculatus		2.5 cm (0.98 in)					
Phoenix rasbora	Boraras merah		2 cm (0.79 in)					
Eyespot rasbora	Brevibora dorsiocellata		3.5 cm (1.4 in)					
Brittans Rasbora	Kottelatia brittani		6 cm (2.4 in)					
Porthole Rasbora	Rasbora cephalotaenia		13 cm (5.1 in)					
Brilliant rasbora	Rasbora einthovenii		9 cm (3.5 in)					
Clown rasbora	Rasbora kalochroma		10 cm (3.9 in)					
Patrick's Rasbora	Rasbora patrickyapi		6 cm (2.4 in)					
Scissortail rasbora	Rasbora trilineata		15 cm (5.9 in)					
Volcano rasbora	Rasbora vulcanus		5 cm (2.0 in)					
Kubotai Rasbora, Green Kubotai Rasbora, Green Neon Rasbora, Yellow Neon Rasbora	Microdevario kubotai		2 cm (0.79 in)					
Blackline rasbora, red-tailed rasbora	Rasbora borapetensis		10 cm (3.9 in)					
Espei rasbora	Trigonostigma espei		5 cm (2.0 in)					
Fire rasbora	Rasboroides vaterifloris		4 cm (1.6 in)					
Least rasbora	Boraras urophthalmoides		1.6 cm (0.63 in)					

Danios and other danionins

Common name	Scientific name	Image	Size	Remarks	Tank size	Temperature range	pH range	Water Hardness
	Sundadanio axelrodi		2 cm (0.79 in)					
Pearl danio	Danio albolineatus		6.5 cm (2.6 in)	subspecies:blue-redstripe danio, Kedah danio				
Barred danio	Devario pathirana		6 cm (2.4 in)					
Celestial Pearl danio	Danio margaritatus		2 cm (0.79 in)					
Emerald dwarf danio	Danio erythromicron		2 cm (0.79 in)					
Fireline devario	Devario sondhii		4.5 cm (1.8 in)					
Giant danio	Devario aequipinnatus		15 cm (5.9 in)					
Lake Inle Danio	Devario auropurpureus		8 cm (3.1 in)					
Glowlight danio	Danio choprae		4 cm (1.6 in)					
Gold-ring danio	Danio tinwini		2 cm (0.79 in)					
Malabar danio	Devario malabaricus		11.5–14 cm (4.5–5.5 in)					
Ocelot danio	Danio kyathit		6 cm (2.4 in)					
Spotted danio	Danio nigrofasciatus		4 cm (1.6 in)					
Turquoise danio	Danio kerri		5 cm (2.0 in)					
Zebra danio	Danio rerio		5 cm (2.0 in)					
	Opsarius ardens		10 cm (3.9 in)					
	Opsarius pulchellus		11 cm (4.3 in)					

Cold-water cyprinids

Common name	Scientific name	Image	Size	Remarks	Tank size	Temperature range	pH range	Water Hardness
Goldfish	Carassius auratus		15+ cm (6+ in)	variations: Black Moor, Bubble Eye, Butterfly Tail, Calico, Celestial Eye, Comet, Common, Fantail, Lionchu, Lionhead, Oranda, Panda Moor, Pearlscale, Pompom, Ranchu, Ryukin, Shubunkin, Telescope eye, Veiltail.				
Koi, common carp	Cyprinus carpio		30+ cm (12+ in)					
White Cloud Mountain minnow	Tanichthys albonubes		3.8 cm (1.5 in)					
Red shiner	Cyprinella lutrensis		9 cm (3.5 in)					
Rainbow shiner	Notropis chrosomus		8 cm (3.1 in)					
Chinese high fin banded shark	Myxocyprinus asiaticus		60 cm (24 in)					
Tench	Tinca tinca		35 cm (14 in)					
Amur bitterling	Rhodeus sericeus		10 cm (3.9 in)					

== Loaches ==
Loaches

Common name	Scientific name	Image	Size	Remarks	Tank size	Temperature range	pH range
Borneo hillstream loach	Gastromyzon ctenocephalus		4.5 cm (1.8 in)	Eats mainly algae. High oxygen level and water quality are greatly appreciated in addition to a strong current (but not needed as many sources claim)	10 U.S. gal (38 L)	18–25 °C (64–77 °F)	6.5 – 8.0 pH
Borneo hillstream loach	Gastromyzon zebrinus		6 cm (2.4 in)	See above	10 U.S. gal (38 L)	18–25 °C (64–77 °F)	6.5 – 8.0 pH
Clown loach	Chromobotia macracanthus		30.5 cm (12.0 in)				
Green tiger loach	Syncrossus hymenophysa		21 cm (8.3 in)				
Fire-eyed loach	Barbucca diabolica		2.5 cm (0.98 in)				
Fork-tailed loach	Vaillantella maassi		12.5 cm (4.9 in)				
Horseface loach	Acantopsis dialuzona		20 cm (7.9 in)				
	Pangio anguillaris		12 cm (4.7 in)				
	Pangio cuneovirgata		6 cm (2.4 in)				
Java loach	Pangio oblonga		8 cm (3.1 in)				6.2 to 7.0
	Pangio shelfordii		8 cm (3.1 in)				
Kuhli loach, coolie loach	Pangio semicincta		10 cm (3.9 in)	The natural habitat of the kuhli loach is the sandy beds of slow-moving rivers and clean mountain streams. They are a social fish and are typically found in small clusters (they are not schooling fish but enjoy the company of their species), but are cautious and nocturnal by nature and swim near the bottom where they feed around obstacles. Kuhli loaches are scavengers, so they will eat anything that reaches the bottom.		75–86 °F (24–30 °C)	5.5 – 6.5
Saddle-back Loach	Homaloptera orthogoniata		13 cm (5.1 in)	The Saddleback Loach will thrive in an aquarium with a good amount of water flow and aeration, considerable amounts of hiding places formed by rocks or driftwood and smooth pebbles and stones to graze on.		68 - 78 F (20 - 25.6 C)	6 - 7.5
Dwarf botia	Ambastaia sidthimunki		5.5 cm (2.2 in)	Formerly named Botia sidthimunki.			
Bengal loach	Botia dario		15 cm (5.9 in)	Also known as the Queen loach.			
	Botia histrionica		12 cm (4.7 in)				
Gangetic loach	Botia rostrata		25 cm (9.8 in)				
Polka-Dot Loach	Botia kubotai		12 cm (4.7 in)				
Yoyo loach	Botia almorhae		15 cm (5.9 in)				
Zebra loach	Botia striata		9 cm (3.5 in)				
Redtail loach	Yasuhikotakia modesta		25 cm (9.8 in)				
Skunk loach	Yasuhikotakia morleti		10 cm (3.9 in)	Formerly named Botia morleti			
	Yasuhikotakia splendida		10 cm (3.9 in)				
Banded tiger loach	Syncrossus helodes		30 cm (12 in)				
Redfin tiger loach	Syncrossus berdmorei		15 cm (5.9 in)				
Golden zebra loach	Sinibotia pulchra		10 cm (3.9 in)				
Imperial flower loach	Leptobotia elongata		50 cm (20 in)				
Butterfly hillstream loach	Beaufortia kweichowensis		8 cm (3.1 in)	Eats mainly algae. High oxygen level and water quality are greatly appreciated in addition to a strong current (but not needed as many sources claim)			
Panda loach	Yaoshania pachychilus		6 cm (2.4 in)				
Tiger hillstream loach	Sewellia lineolata		6 cm (2.4 in)	Eats mainly algae. High oxygen level and water quality are greatly appreciated in addition to a strong current (but not needed as many sources claim)			
Rosy loach	Physoschistura mango		3 cm (1.2 in)				
Sumo loach	Schistura balteata		8 cm (3.1 in)				
Zodiac loach	Mesonoemacheilus triangularis		6 cm (2.4 in)				
	Serpenticobitis octozona		5.5 cm (2.2 in)				
Weather Loach	Misgurnus anguillicaudatus		30 centimetres (12 in)	Sensitive to changes in barometric pressure			

== Live-bearers ==
Guppies and mollies

Common name	Scientific name	Image	Size	Remarks	Tank size	Temperature range	pH range	Water Hardness
Guppy Fancy Guppy	Poecilia reticulata		5 cm (2.0 in)	Many color and tail pattern varieties exist. They generally need a ratio of 1 male to 2 females or more. All guppies and mollies are hardy fish that tolerate lower oxygen levels and temperatures than most aquarium fish, give birth to live young, and readily breed in home tanks. can live in full sea water		66 °F - 84 °F (19 °C - 29 °C)	7 - 8	
Endler's livebearer	Poecilia wingei		3.8 cm (1.5 in)					
Black molly	Poecilia sphenops		10 cm (3.9 in)	Can live in full sea water				
Sailfin molly	Poecilia latipinna		10 cm (3.9 in)	Gold and silver varieties commonly found; also thrive in brackish water/ full sea water				
Yucatán molly, giant sailfin molly	Poecilia velifera		15 cm (5.9 in)					
Dalmatian molly	hybrid		5 cm (2.0 in)	The dalmatian molly is a hybrid color variation that can be generated by crossing some species of Poecilia, like P. sphenops and P. latipinna. The variety "Dalmatian" is spotted alike to a Dalmatian dog. Can live in full sea water				
Lyretail Molly	hybrid		5 cm (2.0 in)	Lyretail Mollies are available in all of these species, can be cross bred with any species of Molly. Can live in full sea water				

Platies and swordtails

Common name	Scientific name	Image	Size	Remarks	Tank size	Temperature range	pH range	Water Hardness
Southern platy	Xiphophorus maculatus		6 cm (2.4 in)					
Variable platy	Xiphophorus variatus		6 cm (2.4 in)					
Green swordtail	Xiphophorus hellerii		14 cm (5.5 in)					
Montezuma swordtail	Xiphophorus montezumae		5.5 cm (2.2 in)					

Other livebearers

Common name	Scientific name	Image	Size	Remarks	Tank size	Temperature range	pH range	Water Hardness
Largescale four-eyed fish	Anableps anableps		30 cm (12 in)					
Pike topminnow	Belonesox belizanus		6 cm (2.4 in)					
Redtail splitfin	Xenotoca eiseni		6 cm (2.4 in)					
Cuban lima	Limia vittata		8 cm (3.1 in)					
Knife livebearer	Alfaro cultratus		7.5 cm (3.0 in)					
Least killifish	Heterandria formosa		3.5 cm (1.4 in)					
Eastern mosquitofish	Gambusia holbrooki		6.4 cm (2.5 in)					
Western mosquitofish	Gambusia affinis		6 cm (2.4 in)					
Metallic livebearer	Girardinus metallicus		5 cm (2.0 in)					
Dwarf merry widow	Phallichthys tico		2.5 cm (0.98 in)					
Tanganyika killifish	Lamprichthys tanganicanus		15 cm (5.9 in)					
Norman's lampeye	Poropanchax normani		4.5 cm (1.8 in)					
Large finned lampeye	Procatopus nototaenia		6 cm (2.4 in)			20-25 °C		
Variable lampeye	Procatopus similis		6 cm (2.4 in)					
Celebes halfbeak	Nomorhamphus liemi		8 cm (3.1 in)					
Wrestling halfbeak	Dermogenys pusilla		7.5 cm (3.0 in)	Wrestling Halfbeaks are best kept in groups, composed of either a single male with several females, or, in more spacious quarters with ample visual barriers, larger mixed groups containing at least six males.		75-82 F (24-28 C)	7 - 8	
Forest halfbeak	Hemirhamphodon pogonognathus		10 cm (3.9 in)					
	Hemirhamphodon tengah		3.5 cm (1.4 in)					

== Killifish ==
African killifishes

Common name	Scientific name	Image	Size	Remarks	Tank size	Temperature range	pH range	Water Hardness
Broken-line killifish	Aphyosemion ogoense		5 cm (2.0 in)					
Gabon killifish	Aphyosemion gabunense		5 cm (2.0 in)					
Gabon jewelfish	Aphyosemion cyanostictum		6.5 cm (2.6 in)					
Lyretail panchax	Aphyosemion australe		6 cm (2.4 in)					
Red-striped killifish	Aphyosemion striatum		6 cm (2.4 in)					
Two-striped killifish	Aphyosemion bitaeniatum		5 cm (2.0 in)					
Twostripe lyretail	Aphyosemion bivittatum		5 cm (2.0 in)					
Blue lyretail	Fundulopanchax gardneri		5 cm (2.0 in)					
Blue gularis	Fundulopanchax sjostedti		13 cm (5.1 in)					
	Fundulopanchax scheeli		6 cm (2.4 in)					
Clown Killifish, rocket killifish	Epiplatys annulatus		3.5 cm (1.4 in)		50 L (13 U.S. gal)	25–27 °C (77–81 °F)	6 - 7 pH	
Redchin panchax	Epiplatys dageti		6 cm (2.4 in)					
Bluefin Notho, Rachow's Notho, Rainbow Notho	Nothobranchius rachovii		6 cm (2.4 in)					
Redtail notho	Nothobranchius guentheri		3.5 cm (1.4 in)					
	Nothobranchius eggersi		5 cm (2.0 in)					
	Nothobranchius korthausae		5 cm (2.0 in)					
	Nothobranchius palmqvisti		5 cm (2.0 in)					

Other killifishes

Common name	Scientific name	Image	Size	Remarks	Tank size	Temperature range	pH range	Water Hardness
Blue panchax	Aplocheilus panchax		9 cm (3.5 in)					
Ceylon killifish	Aplocheilus dayi		9 cm (3.5 in)					
Striped panchax, Golden Wonder	Aplocheilus lineatus		10 cm (3.9 in)					
Madagascar panchax	Pachypanchax sakaramyi		9 cm (3.5 in)					
Playfair's panchax	Pachypanchax playfairii		10 cm (3.9 in)					
Powder-blue Panchax	Pachypanchax omalonotus		9 cm (3.5 in)					
American flagfish	Jordanella floridae		6 cm (2.4 in)	Native to SE United States				
Golden topminnow	Fundulus chrysotus		8.5 cm (3.3 in)					
Arabian toothcarp	Aphaniops dispar		7 cm (2.8 in)					
Argentine pearl	Austrolebias nigripinnis		7 cm (2.8 in)					
	Laimosemion xiphidius		5.5 cm (2.2 in)					
Lyrefin pearlfish	Simpsonichthys boitonei		4.5 cm (1.8 in)					
Saberfin killie	Terranatos dolichopterus		4 cm (1.6 in)					
Medaka	Oryzias latipes		4 cm (1.6 in)					
Javanese ricefish	Oryzias javanicus		3.5 cm (1.4 in)					
Daisy's Ricefish	Oryzias woworae		2.5–3 cm (0.98–1.18 in)					

== Labyrinth fish ==
Gourami

Common name	Scientific name	Image	Size	Remarks	Tank size	Temperature range	pH range	Water Hardness
Ceylonese combtail	Belontia signata		18 cm (7.1 in)					
Siamese fighting fish (sometimes Betta, esp. US)	Betta splendens		7.5 cm (3.0 in)	Betta is the name of the genus that includes more than 60 species other than the Siamese fighting fish.	5 gal	72–82 °F (22–28 °C)	6.5-7.5	
Emerald betta	Betta smaragdina		7 cm (2.8 in)					
Spotfin betta	Betta macrostoma		10 cm (3.9 in)					
Frail gourami	Ctenops nobilis		4 cm (1.6 in)					
Black paradisefish	Macropodus spechti		8 cm (3.1 in)					
Paradise fish	Macropodus opercularis		7.5 cm (3.0 in)					
Round tail paradisefish	Macropodus ocellatus		8.5 cm (3.3 in)					
Ornate paradisefish	Malpulutta kretseri		4 cm (1.6 in)					
Eyespot gourami	Parasphaerichthys ocellatus		5 cm (2.0 in)					
Brown Spike-tailed paradisefish	Pseudosphromenus dayi		4 cm (1.6 in)					
Honey gourami	Trichogaster chuna		5.5 cm (2.2 in)					
Dwarf gourami	Trichogaster lalius		5 cm (2.0 in)	Suitable for small to mid-sized aquariums but cannot compete with more aggressive fish and males kept together may fight. Several color varieties available. Massive inbreeding has led to high rates of Dwarf gourami iridovirus (DGIV) in pet store fish.		72 – 82 °F (22 – 27 °C)	6 - 7.5	
Thick-lipped gourami	Trichogaster labiosa		9 cm (3.5 in)					
Moonlight gourami	Trichopodus microlepis		15 cm (5.9 in)					
Snakeskin gourami	Trichopodus pectoralis		20 cm (7.9 in)					
Pygmy gourami, Sparkling gourami	Trichopsis pumila		3.8 cm (1.5 in)					
Malay combtail	Belontia hasselti		20 cm (7.9 in)					
	Betta albimarginata		3 cm (1.2 in)					
	Betta brownorum		3 cm (1.2 in)					
	Betta burdigala		3.5 cm (1.4 in)					
	Betta channoides		3 cm (1.2 in)					
Scarlet betta	Betta coccina		4 cm (1.6 in)					
	Betta foerschi		5 cm (2.0 in)					
	Betta hendra		4 cm (1.6 in)					
Crescent betta	Betta imbellis		6 cm (2.4 in)					
	Betta mandor		5 cm (2.0 in)					
	Betta persephone		3.5 cm (1.4 in)					
Toba betta	Betta rubra		4 cm (1.6 in)					
	Betta rutilans		3.5 cm (1.4 in)					
	Betta uberis		3.5 cm (1.4 in)					
Giant pikehead	Luciocephalus pulcher		20 cm (7.9 in)					
Peppermint pikehead	Luciocephalus aura		10 cm (3.9 in)					
	Parosphromenus anjunganensis		3 cm (1.2 in)					
	Parosphromenus bintan		3 cm (1.2 in)					
	Parosphromenus deissneri		3 cm (1.2 in)					
	Parosphromenus filamentosus		3 cm (1.2 in)					
	Parosphromenus linkei		3 cm (1.2 in)					
	Parosphromenus opallios		3 cm (1.2 in)					
	Parosphromenus ornaticauda		3 cm (1.2 in)					
	Parosphromenus phoenicurus		3 cm (1.2 in)					
	Parosphromenus quindecim		3 cm (1.2 in)					
Chocolate gourami	Sphaerichthys osphromenoides		6 cm (2.4 in)					
Crossband chocolate gourami	Sphaerichthys selatanensis		4 cm (1.6 in)					
Samurai gourami	Sphaerichthys vaillanti		4 cm (1.6 in)					
Pearl gourami	Trichopodus leerii		11.5 cm (4.5 in)					
Three spot gourami	Trichopodus trichopterus		10 cm (3.9 in)					
Croaking gourami	Trichopsis vittata		6.5 cm (2.6 in)					
Giant gourami	Osphronemus goramy		60 cm (24 in)					

Other labyrinth fishes

Common name	Scientific name	Image	Size	Remarks	Tank size	Temperature range	pH range	Water Hardness
Kissing gourami	Helostoma temminckii		15 cm (5.9 in)					
Climbing perch	Anabas testudineus		20 cm (7.9 in)					
Leopard bush fish	Ctenopoma acutirostre		15 cm (5.9 in)					
Mottled ctenopoma	Ctenopoma weeksii		12 cm (4.7 in)					
Tailspot ctenopoma	Ctenopoma kingsleyae		20 cm (7.9 in)					
Ornate ctenopoma	Microctenopoma ansorgii		5 cm (2.0 in)					
Blue badis	Badis badis		7 cm (2.8 in)					
Scarlet badis	Dario dario		1.5 cm (0.59 in)					
Black tiger dario	Dario tigris		2.5 cm (0.98 in)					
Bornean leaffish	Nandus nebulosus		12 cm (4.7 in)					
Malayan leaffish	Pristolepis fasciata		20 cm (7.9 in)					
Forest snakehead	Channa lucius		40 cm (16 in)	Illegal to possess live in the USA without a permit				
Dwarf snakehead	Channa gachua		20 cm (7.9 in)	Illegal to possess live in the USA without a permit				
Emperor snakehead	Channa marulioides		65 cm (26 in)	Illegal to possess live in the USA without a permit				
Giant snakehead	Channa micropeltes		130 cm (51 in)	Illegal to possess live in the USA without a permit				
Ocellated snakehead	Channa pleurophthalma		35 cm (14 in)	Illegal to possess live in the USA without a permit				
Orange-spotted snakehead	Channa aurantimaculata		36 cm (14 in)					
Barca snakehead	Channa barca		105 cm (41 in)					
Rainbow snakehead	Channa bleheri		14.5 cm (5.7 in)					
African snakehead	Parachanna obscura		50 cm (20 in)	Illegal to possess live in the USA without a permit				

== Euteleostei ==
=== Protacanthopterygii ===
Common name	Scientific name	Image	Size	Remarks	Tank size	Temperature range	pH range	Water Hardness
Northern pike	Esox lucius		150 cm (59 in)					
Humphead glassfish	Parambassis pulcinella		8 cm (3.1 in)					
Indian glassy fish	Parambassis ranga		8 cm (3.1 in)					
Glassfish Glass perch	Gymnochanda filamentosa		3.8 cm (1.5 in)			24-28 °C		
Mouth almighty	Glossamia aprion		3.8 cm (1.5 in)					
Amazon leaffish	Monocirrhus polyacanthus		8 cm (3.1 in)					
African leaffish	Polycentropsis abbreviata		8 cm (3.1 in)					
Nile perch	Lates niloticus		200 cm (79 in)					

=== Rainbowfish ===
Common name	Scientific name	Image	Size	Remarks	Tank size	Temperature range	pH range	Water Hardness
Bleher's rainbowfish	Chilatherina bleheri		12 cm (4.7 in)					
Red rainbowfish	Glossolepis incisus		9–13 cm (3.5–5.1 in)	Almost all rainbowfish species are bred in captivity and wild populations may be protected.				
Threadfin rainbowfish	Iriatherina werneri		3–4 cm (1.2–1.6 in)					
New Guinea rainbowfish	Melanotaenia affinis		13 cm (5.1 in)					
Boeseman's rainbowfish	Melanotaenia boesemani		10–13 cm (3.9–5.1 in)					
Lake Kurumoi rainbowfish	Melanotaenia parva		7.5–8 cm (3.0–3.1 in)					
Neon rainbowfish	Melanotaenia praecox		6–7.5 cm (2.4–3.0 in)					
Lake Wanam rainbowfish	Glossolepis wanamensis		9 cm (3.5 in)					
Western rainbowfish	Melanotaenia australis		11 cm (4.3 in)					
Duboulayi's rainbowfish	Melanotaenia duboulayi		13–15 cm (5.1–5.9 in)	a.k.a. Crimson-Spotted rainbowfish				
Australian rainbowfish	Melanotaenia fluviatilis		13–15 cm (5.1–5.9 in)					
Lake Tebera rainbowfish	Melanotaenia herbertaxelrodi		9 cm (3.5 in)					
Lake Kutubu rainbowfish	Melanotaenia lacustris		12 cm (4.7 in)					
Parkinson's rainbowfish	Melanotaenia parkinsoni		11 cm (4.3 in)					
Eastern rainbowfish	Melanotaenia splendida splendida		13–15 cm (5.1–5.9 in)					
Banded rainbowfish	Melanotaenia trifasciata		13 cm (5.1 in)					
Celebes rainbow	Marosatherina ladigesi		8 cm (3.1 in)					
Spotted blue-eye	Pseudomugil gertrudae		3–4 cm (1.2–1.6 in)					
Red neon blue-eye	Pseudomugil luminatus		3–3.5 cm (1.2–1.4 in)					
Delicate blue-eye	Pseudomugil tenellus		4–5.5 cm (1.6–2.2 in)					
Forktail blue-eye	Pseudomugil furcatus		4–5 cm (1.6–2.0 in)	These fish need a larger aquarium than their size suggests. Though they only grow to a length of about 2 inches, they are happiest in groups of 8 – 10 or more, and they appreciate lots of swimming space.		75 - 79 °F (24 - 26 °C)	6.5 - 8.0	
Neon blue-eye	Pseudomugil cyanodorsalis		3.5 cm (1.4 in)					
Pacific blue-eye	Pseudomugil signifer		3.5–7 cm (1.4–2.8 in)					
Madagascar rainbowfish	Bedotia madagascariensis		7.5–8 cm (3.0–3.1 in)					

=== Gobies and sleepers ===
Common name	Scientific name	Image	Size	Remarks	Tank size	Temperature range	pH range	Water Hardness
Bumblebee goby	Brachygobius doriae		4 cm (1.6 in)					
	Mugilogobius rexi		3 cm (1.2 in)					
Knight goby	Stigmatogobius sadanundio		9 cm (3.5 in)					
Barred mudskipper	Periophthalmus argentilineatus		19 cm (7.5 in)					
	Stiphodon annieae		2.5 cm (0.98 in)					
Rainbow stiphodon	Stiphodon ornatus		5 cm (2.0 in)					
Cobalt blue goby	Stiphodon semoni		4–5 cm (1.6–2.0 in)					
	Sicyopus exallisquamulus		5 cm (2.0 in)					
	Sicyopus zosterophorus		4.5 cm (1.8 in)					
Bearded worm goby	Taenioides cirratus		30 cm (12 in)					
Banded mogurnda	Mogurnda cingulata		13 cm (5.1 in)					
Tropical carp-gudgeon	Hypseleotris cyprinoides		8 cm (3.1 in)					
Crazy fish	Butis butis		15 cm (5.9 in)					
Marbled goby	Oxyeleotris marmorata		30–65 cm (12–26 in)					
	Rhinogobius duospilus		6 cm (2.4 in)					
	Stiphodon percnopterygionus		4 cm (1.6 in)					
Golden-red stiphodon	Stiphodon rutilaureus		4.5 cm (1.8 in)					
Atlantic mudskipper	Periophthalmus barbarus		16 cm (6.3 in)					
Desert goby	Chlamydogobius eremius		6 cm (2.4 in)					
Dragon goby, Violet goby	Gobioides broussonnetii		55 cm (22 in)					
Empire gudgeon	Hypseleotris compressa		12 cm (4.7 in)					
Purple sleeper gudgeon	Mogurnda mogurnda		20 cm (7.9 in)					
Peacock gudgeon, Peacock goby	Tateurndina ocellicauda		7.5 cm (3.0 in)	A little territorial with its own kind but is suitable for many communities of small, peaceful fish. Ideal tankmates are other species from Papua New Guinea, such as Popondetta sp. rainbowfishes; but tetras, rasboras, Corydoras cats and virtually any other small peaceful species are also suitable.	40 L (11 U.S. gal)	22–26 °C (72–79 °F)	6.5 7.5 pH	
Striped sleeper goby	Dormitator maculatus		70 cm (28 in)					

Common name	Scientific name	Image	Size	Remarks	Tank size	Temperature range	pH range	Water Hardness
Indonesian tigerfish	Datnioides microlepis		55 cm (22 in)					
Silver tigerfish	Datnioides polota		30 cm (12 in)					
New Guinea tigerfish	Datnioides campbelli		32 cm (13 in)					
Banded archerfish	Toxotes jaculatrix		30 cm (12 in)					
Seven-spot archerfish	Toxotes chatareus		40 cm (16 in)					
Spotted scat	Scatophagus argus		20 cm (7.9 in)					
African scat	Scatophagus tetracanthus		30 cm (12 in)					
Striped scat, spotbanded scat	Selenotoca multifasciata		40 cm (15.5 in)					
Silver moony	Monodactylus argenteus		27 cm (10.5 in)					
African moony	Monodactylus sebae		25 cm (10 in)					
Freshwater pipefish	Doryichthys martensii		15 cm (5.9 in)					
African freshwater pipefish	Enneacampus ansorgii		14 cm (5.5 in)					
Zebra blenny	Omobranchus zebra		6 cm (2.4 in)					
Freshwater blenny	Salariopsis fluviatilis		15.4 cm (6.1 in)					
Freshwater needlefish	Xenentodon cancila		35 cm (14 in)					
Grunting toadfish	Allenbatrachus grunniens		30 cm (12 in)					
Leaf goblinfish	Neovespicula depressifrons		10 cm (4 in)					
Freshwater sole	Achiroides melanorhynchus		14 cm (5.5 in)					
Golden puffer	Auriglobus modestus		10 cm (3.9 in)	Pufferfish inflating out of water can cause death.				
Green spotted puffer	Dichotomyctere nigroviridis		15 cm (5.9 in)	See above				
Figure 8 pufferfish	Dichotomyctere ocellatus		6 cm (2.4 in)	See above				
Humpback Puffer	Pao palembangensis		20 cm (7.9 in)	See above				
Red-tail dwarf puffer	Carinotetraodon irrubesco		4.5 cm (1.8 in)	See above				
Arrowhead puffer	Pao suvattii		15 cm (5.9 in)					
Hairy pufferfish	Pao baileyi		12 cm (4.7 in)					
Dwarf Pufferfish, Pea Puffer	Carinotetraodon travancoricus		2.9 cm (1.1 in)					
Fahaka puffer	Tetraodon lineatus		43 cm (17 in)					
Mbu puffer	Tetraodon mbu		75 cm (30 in)	This fish also occurs in estuaries. largest freshwater pufferfish, they are very peaceful with most fish except, other Mbu pufferfish, other fish that will harass them. see above				
Congo pufferfish	Tetraodon miurus		15 cm (5.9 in)	As it is an ambush pufferfish it is best to house it alone as it will attack tank mates. See above.				
	Tetraodon schoutedeni		9 cm (3.5 in)					
Amazon puffer	Colomesus asellus		13 cm (5 in)					
Everglades pygmy sunfish	Elassoma evergladei		3 cm (1.2 in)					
Blackbanded sunfish	Enneacanthus chaetodon		10 cm (3.9 in)					
Orangespotted sunfish	Lepomis humilis		15 cm (5.9 in)					
Brook stickleback	Culaea inconstans		5 cm (2.0 in)					
Rainbow darter	Etheostoma caeruleum		8 cm (3.1 in)					

== See also ==
- List of aquarium fish by scientific name
- List of brackish aquarium fish species
- List of fish common names
- List of freshwater aquarium amphibian species
- List of freshwater aquarium invertebrate species
- List of freshwater aquarium plant species
- List of marine aquarium fish species
- List of marine aquarium invertebrate species

== Sources ==
- Alderton, D. (2005). Encyclopedia of Aquarium and Pond Fish. Dorling Kindersley.
- Jennings, G. (2006). 500 Aquarium Fish: A Visual Reference to the Most Popular Species. Firefly Books.
- Sakurai, A.; Sakamoto, Y.; Mori, F. (1993). Aquarium Fish of the World: The Comprehensive Guide to 650 Species. Chronicle Books.
