= Bandit corydoras =

Bandit corydoras or bandit cory is a common name shared by two similar but distinct species of fish:

- Corydoras metae, also known as the masked corydoras, bandit catfish, or Meta River corydoras
- Corydoras melini, also known as the false bandit catfish
