= Eirmotus insignis =

Conservation status
- Least Concern (IUCN 3.1)

Scientific classification
- Kingdom: Animalia
- Phylum: Chordata
- Class: Actinopterygii
- Order: Cypriniformes
- Family: Cyprinidae
- Genus: Eirmotus
- Species: E. insignis

Binomial name
- Eirmotus insignis Tan & Kottelat, 2008

Species of fish

Eirmotus insignis is a species of cyprinid in the genus Eirmotus. It inhabits Borneo and Belitung in Indonesia.
