= Achiroides leucorhynchos =

Conservation status
- Least Concern (IUCN 3.1)

Scientific classification
- Kingdom: Animalia
- Phylum: Chordata
- Class: Actinopterygii
- Order: Carangiformes
- Suborder: Pleuronectoidei
- Family: Soleidae
- Genus: Achiroides
- Species: A. leucorhynchos

Binomial name
- Achiroides leucorhynchos Bleeker, 1851

Fish species

Achiroides leucorhynchos is a species of freshwater sole native to Southeast Asia. It was first described by Pieter Bleeker in 1851.

Achiroides leucorhynchos can grow to 8 cm (3.1 in) standard length. It occurs in Thailand, Peninsular Malaysia, Sumatra, and Borneo in lower reaches of rivers, including brackish areas.
