= Bottom feeder =

Aquatic animal that feeds on the bottom of a body of water

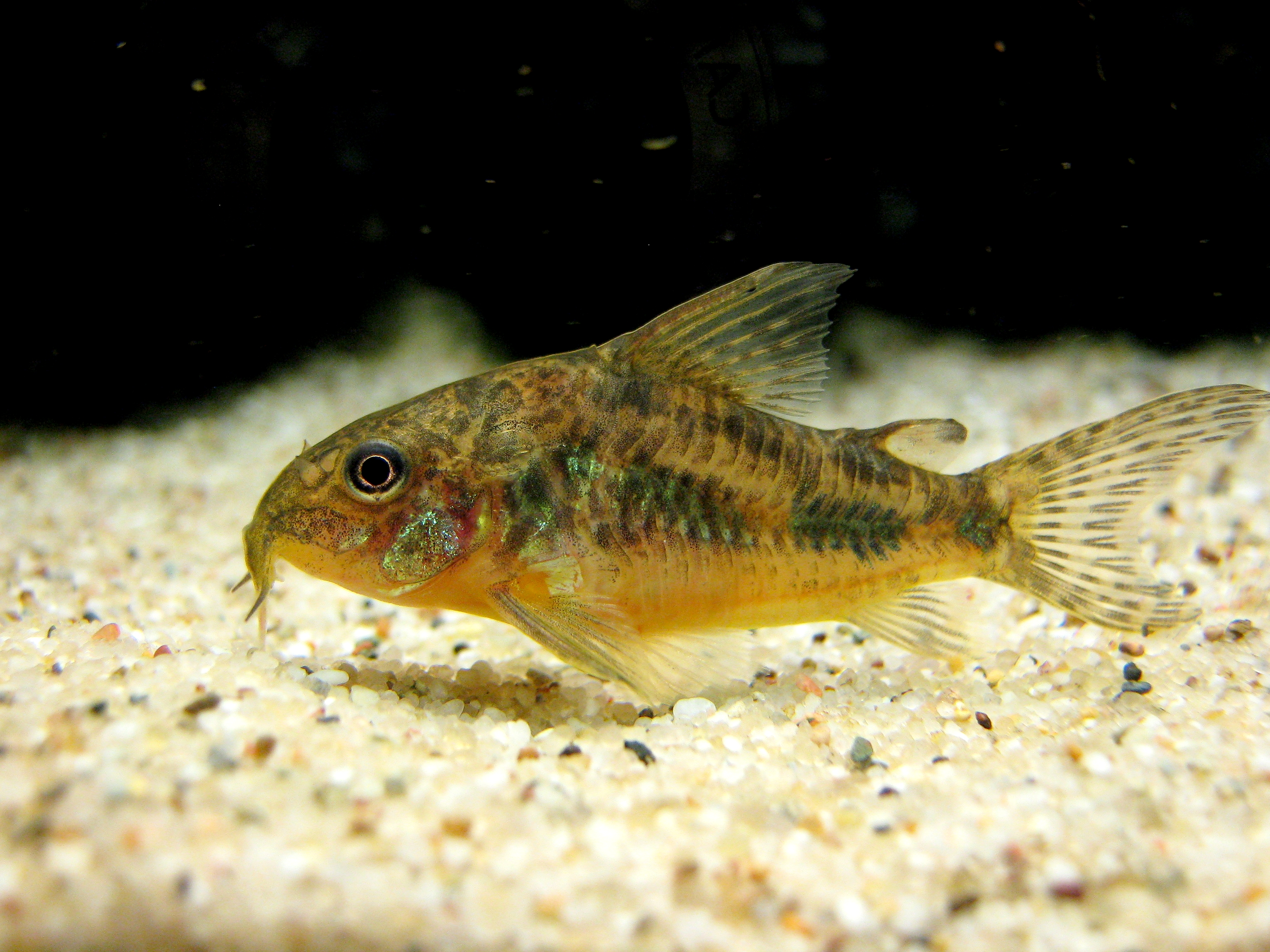
A cory catfish, a commonly kept bottom feeder species in freshwater aquaria. This species is Corydoras paleatus

A bottom feeder is an aquatic animal that feeds on or near the bottom of a body of water. Biologists often use the terms benthos—particularly for invertebrates such as shellfish, crabs, crayfish, sea anemones, starfish, snails, bristleworms and sea cucumbers—and benthivore or benthivorous, for fish and invertebrates that feed on material from the bottom. However the term benthos includes all aquatic life that lives on or near the bottom, which means it also includes non-animals, such as plants and algae. Biologists also use specific terms that refer to bottom feeding fish, such as demersal fish, groundfish, benthic fish and benthopelagic fish. Examples of bottom feeding fish species groups are flatfish (halibut, flounder, plaice, sole), eels, cod, haddock, bass, carp, grouper, bream (snapper) and some species of catfish and sharks.

== Feeding strategies ==
Many bottom feeders are detritivores, taking advantage of organic materials that sink down through bodies of water to the bottom. In ocean environments, this downward drift of detritus is known as marine snow. Bottom feeders may gather detritus manually, as some crab species do; or filter microparticles out of the water using suspension feeding. This biotic decomposition and recycling of organic matter is critical for the health of many aquatic environments as it helps maintain various biogeochemical cycles. In 2014, it was reported that deep sea bottom feeders absorb carbon dioxide by eating creatures such as jellyfish and cephalopods, allowing the greenhouse gas to be retained at the sea floor rather than be released back into the atmosphere.

Other bottom feeders are herbivores or algivores that graze on living aquatic plants and macroalgae, as is the case in gastropods, chitons and some sea urchin species.

Lastly, some bottom feeders are carnivorous and specialize in either using the floor terrain as cover to ambush other animals, or scavenging from carcasses left by other predators. One common hunting method is the animal using body movements to stir up and conceal itself with sediment, a tactic used by many species of flatfish; or simply hide inside burrows or around other existing covers, such as many species of octopus and mantis shrimps, before suddenly emerging from cover to catch unsuspecting prey with fast strikes. Others burrow deep into the floor and hunt with most of the body remaining buried, as in the case of oceanic bobbit worms. In darker deep waters, some bottom predators uses aggressive mimicry and bioluminescence to visually lure and ambush prey, as in the case of anglerfish.

== Physiology ==
In fish, most bottom feeders exhibit a flat ventral region so as to more easily rest their body on the substrate. The exception may be the flatfish, which are laterally depressed but lie on their sides. Also, many exhibit what is termed an "inferior" mouth, which means that the mouth is pointed downwards; this is beneficial as their food is often going to be below them in the substrate. Those bottom feeders with upward-pointing mouths, such as stargazers, tend to seize swimming prey. Some flatfish such as halibut actually have a "migrating" eye that moves to the upward-facing side of the fish as it ages.

== Aquarium care ==
In the aquarium, bottom feeders are popular as it is perceived that they will clean the algae that grows in the tank. Generally, they are only useful for consuming the extra (fresh) food left by overfed or clumsy livestock; the added biomass of additional organisms means that the aquarium will likely be more dirty. Some specialized bottom feeders are more specifically sold as "algae eaters" to increase the amount of free oxygen and aesthetic appeal of a tank.

== See also ==
- Coprophagia
- Demersal fish
- Whitefish (fisheries term)
