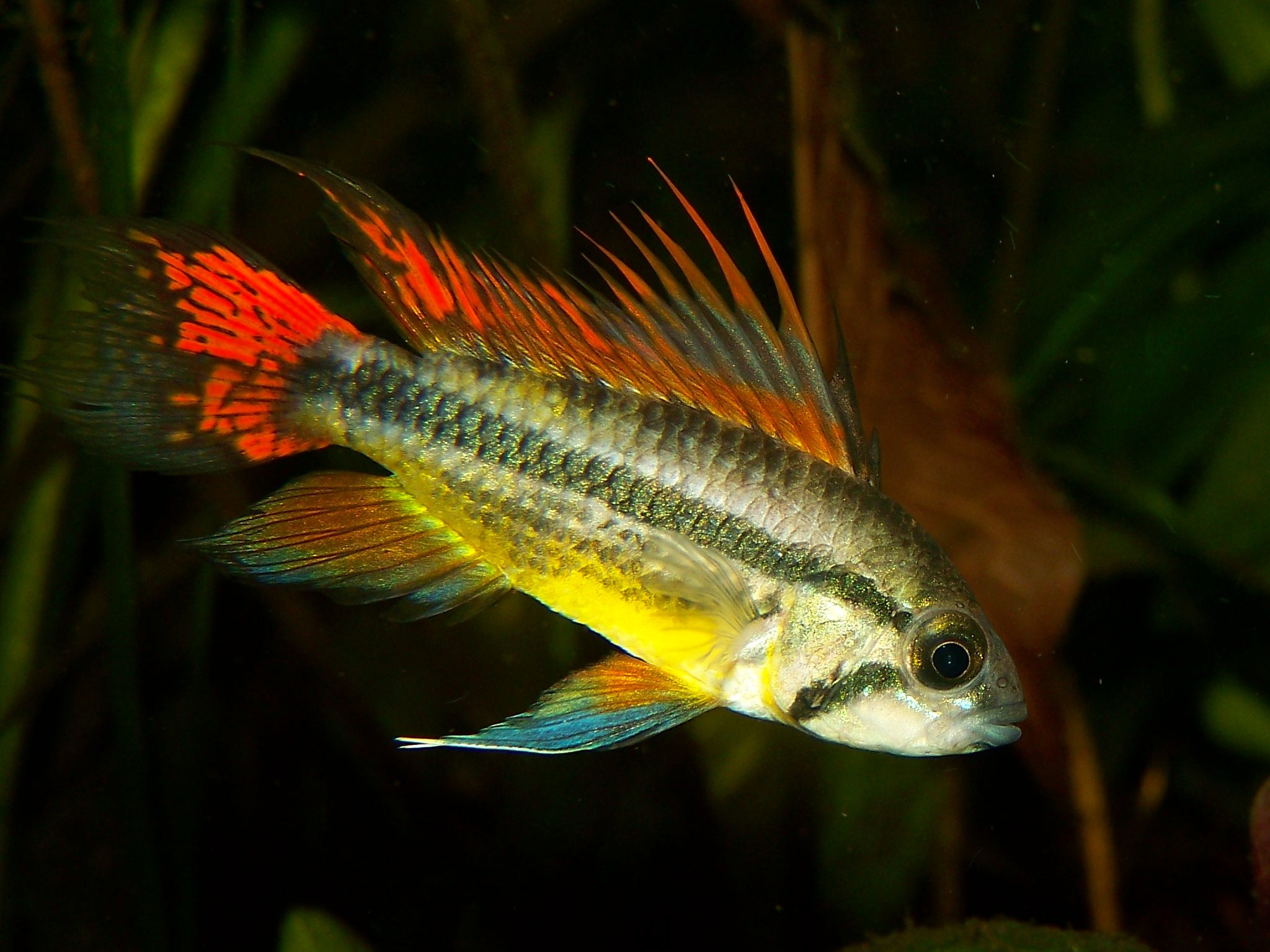
- Male A. cacatuoides

Conservation status
- Least Concern (IUCN 3.1)

Scientific classification
- Kingdom: Animalia
- Phylum: Chordata
- Class: Actinopterygii
- Order: Cichliformes
- Family: Cichlidae
- Genus: Apistogramma
- Species: A. cacatuoides

Binomial name
- Apistogramma cacatuoides Hoedeman, 1951

= Apistogramma cacatuoides =

Species of fish

Apistogramma cacatuoides or the cockatoo dwarf cichlid is a South American cichlid and the Apistogramma species most commonly bred in captivity.

== Characteristics ==
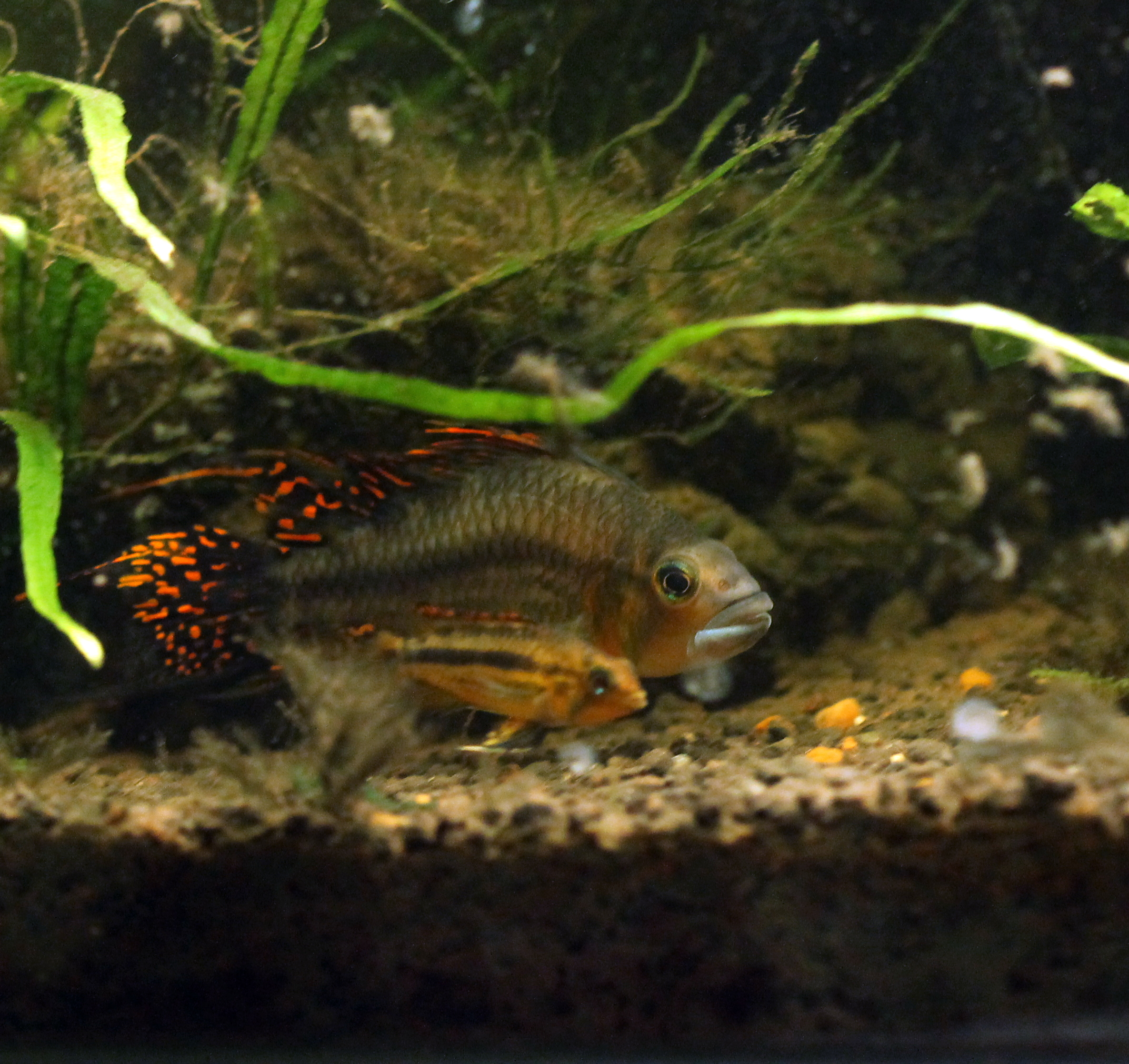
The adult male is twice the size of the adult female

The male cockatoo dwarf cichlid reaches a body length of 8 centimetres (3.1 in). The female is considerably smaller, reaching only 5 centimetres (2.0 in). The body shape is long and of middle height and the mouth is rather big with thick lips. The male is more colorful than the female, usually with red/orange dorsal and caudal fins. The leading 3 or 4 hard rays are elongated, and the ventral fins are clear. In color, the female is quite dull but with a clear black line running along her flanks. Her background color is a pale yellow, but this will become vibrant when mating or brood protecting. In addition, she lacks the elongated dorsal rays of the male and her ventral fins show a black leading edge. There are several color forms which naturally occur in the wild; these include blues, yellows and some reds. Because of selective breeding the colors are now much more pronounced. Both sexes have a dark line leading from the eye to the bottom of the gill flap.

== Range and habitat ==
The cockatoo dwarf cichlid is found in the Amazon River basin, in tributaries of the Ucayali, Amazon and Solimões rivers from the Pachitea River to Tabatinga in Peru and Colombia where it lives in small shallow streams or lagoon-like waters in the rain forest. The fish prefer a water temperature between 24 and 28 °C. The bottom of these waters is covered with leaves that are used by the fish for hiding.

== Breeding ==
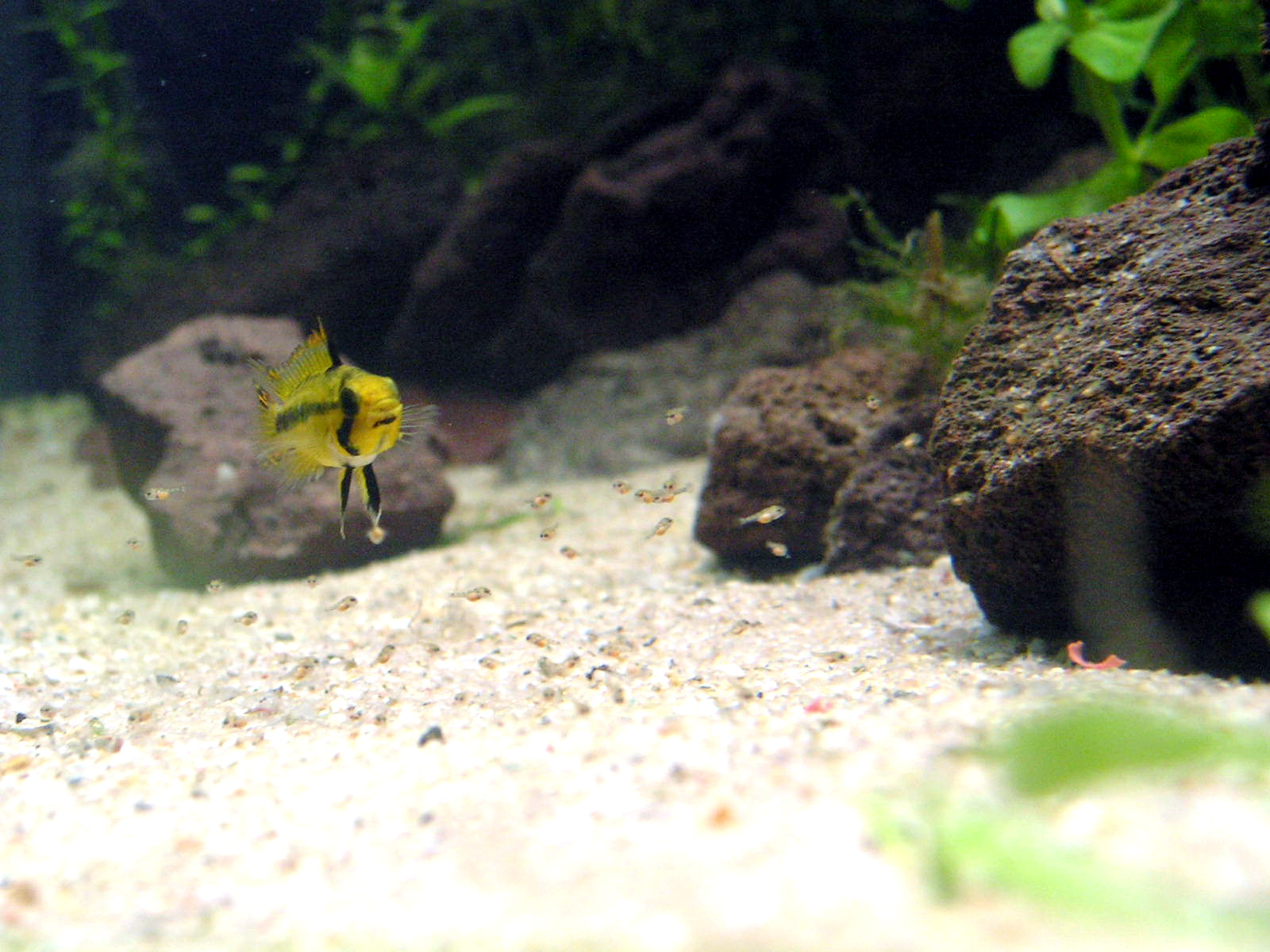
Female with newly free-swimming fry

The female places her eggs inside the roof of a cavity or underneath a leaf. She takes care of the eggs by herself, while the male guards the territory. The eggs are salmon colored.

One of the more interesting traits of Apistogramma cacatuoides is that of "sneaker" males. Due to the aggressive, territorial nature of the males, a submissive male will not develop the full "cockatoo" finnage nor the full male coloration. He will "pretend" to be a female and take any opportunities presented to mate with willing females. If the dominant male then dies, this submissive male will then develop the full finnage.

Small aquaria (less than 120 litres) should be avoided if more than a single pair is to be kept, as a female will protect an area of approximately 30 centimeters in radius. If breeding is to be attempted in a community aquarium, fast-swimming fish should be avoided as they will poach the fry from the female A. cacatuoides.

== Maintenance in the aquarium ==
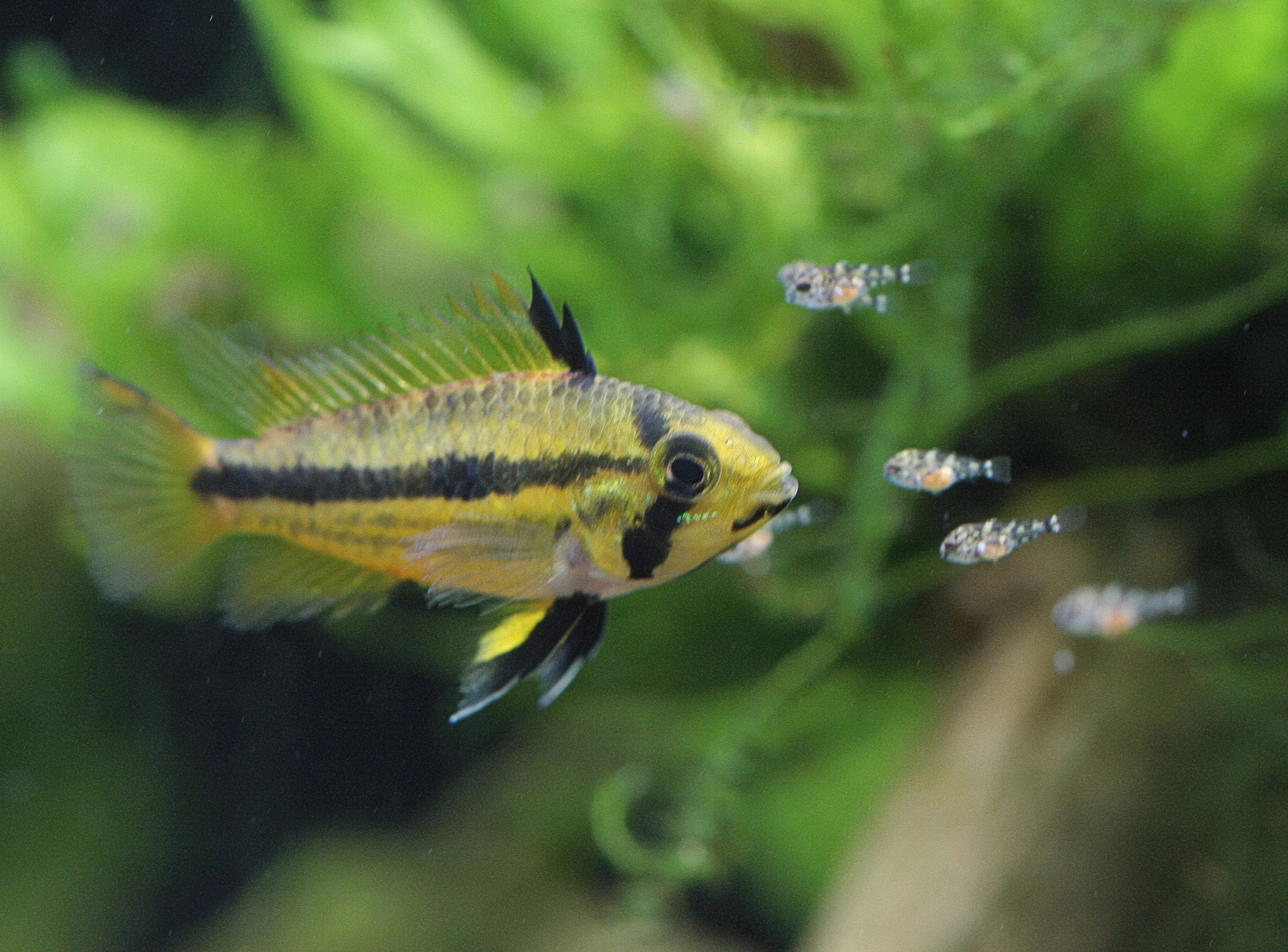
A female and her offspring

The cockatoo dwarf is one of the best suited cichlid species for the planted aquarium. But because the male is highly territorial, the fish should be kept in pairs, trios (one male with two females), or harems (one male with many females), and in the company of peaceful tankmates like tetras. In the case of very large aquariums, more males can be kept together, provided there is plenty of territory, such as wood, heavy planting, and caves. Females also can be highly territorial, not only when in brood care.

Water conditions should be maintained in the pH 6.5-pH 8.0 range. These are one of the few South American dwarf cichlids that can tolerate alkaline water.

== See also ==
- Cichlid
- Dwarf cichlid
- Apistogramma
- List of freshwater aquarium fish species
