= Eirmotus isthmus =

Conservation status
- Data Deficient (IUCN 3.1)

Scientific classification
- Kingdom: Animalia
- Phylum: Chordata
- Class: Actinopterygii
- Order: Cypriniformes
- Family: Cyprinidae
- Genus: Eirmotus
- Species: E. isthmus

Binomial name
- Eirmotus isthmus Tan & Kottelat, 2008

Species of fish

Eirmotus isthmus is a species of freshwater ray-finned fish belonging to the family Cyprinidae, a diverse family which includes the carps, barbs, minnows and related fishes. This species is found on Sumatra and Borneo in Indonesia, and its habitat is lakes and other bodies of water on floodplains. It has a maximum length of 3.3 cm (1.3 in).
