= Eirmotus =

Scientific classification
- Kingdom: Animalia
- Phylum: Chordata
- Class: Actinopterygii
- Order: Cypriniformes
- Family: Cyprinidae
- Subfamily: Cyprininae
- Genus: Eirmotus; L. P. Schultz, 1959

Type species
- Eirmotus octozona Schultz 1959

Genus of fishes

Eirmotus is a genus of freshwater ray-finned fish belonging to the family Cyprinidae, a diverse family which includes the carps, barbs, minnows and related fishes. These fishes are found in mainland Southeast Asia and in Indonesia.

== Species ==
Eirmotus contains the following species:

- Eirmotus furvus H. H. Tan & Kottelat, 2008
- Eirmotus insignis H. H. Tan & Kottelat, 2008
- Eirmotus isthmus H. H. Tan & Kottelat, 2008
- Eirmotus octozona L. P. Schultz, 1959
