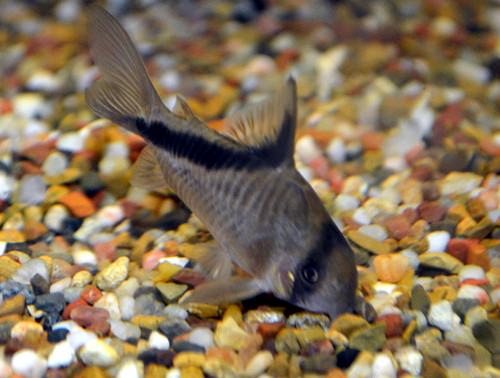

Conservation status
- Least Concern (IUCN 3.1)

Scientific classification
- Domain: Eukaryota
- Kingdom: Animalia
- Phylum: Chordata
- Class: Actinopterygii
- Order: Siluriformes
- Family: Callichthyidae
- Genus: Corydoras
- Species: C. melini

Binomial name
- Corydoras melini Lönnberg & Rendahl, 1930

= Corydoras melini =

Bandit corydoras

Species of fish

Corydoras melini, the bandit corydoras or false bandit catfish, is a tropical freshwater fish belonging to the subfamily Corydoradinae of the family Callichthyidae. It originates in inland waters in South America, and is found in the upper Rio Negro and Meta River basins in Brazil and Colombia.

The fish will grow in length up to 2.0 inches (5.1 centimeters). It lives in a tropical climate in water with a 6.0 - 8.0 pH, a water hardness of 2 - 25 dGH, and a temperature range of 72–79 °F (22–26 °C). It feeds on worms, benthic crustaceans, insects, and plant matter. It lays eggs in dense vegetation and adults do not guard the eggs. The female holds 2-4 eggs between her pelvic fins, where the male fertilizes them for about 30 seconds. Only then does the female swim to a suitable spot, where she attaches the very sticky eggs. The pair repeats this process until about 100 eggs have been fertilized and attached.

The bandit corydoras is of commercial importance in the aquarium trade industry.

== See also ==
- List of freshwater aquarium fish species
