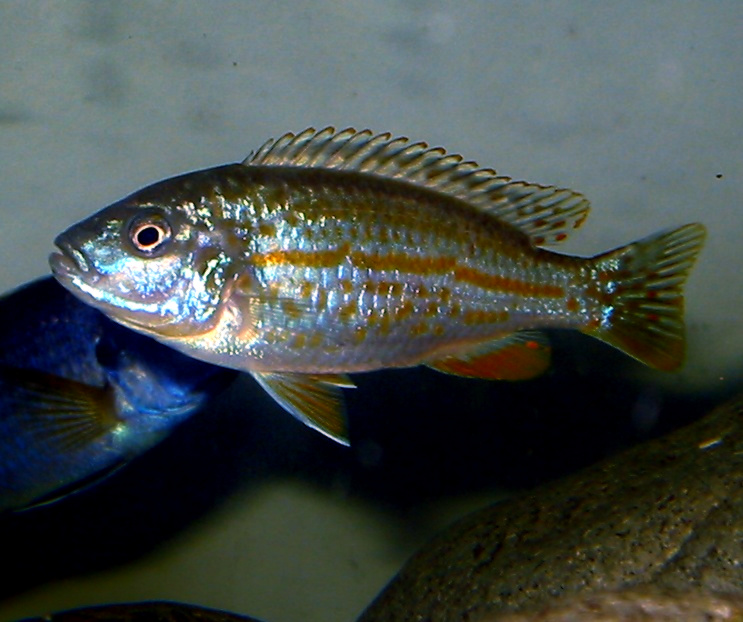

Conservation status
- Near Threatened (IUCN 3.1)

Scientific classification
- Kingdom: Animalia
- Phylum: Chordata
- Class: Actinopterygii
- Order: Cichliformes
- Family: Cichlidae
- Genus: Labidochromis
- Species: L. joanjohnsonae

Binomial name
- Labidochromis joanjohnsonae D. S. Johnson, 1974

Synonyms
- Pseudotropheus joanjohnsonae Johnson, 1974; Melanochromis joanjohnsonae (Johnson, 1974); Melanochromis exasperatus Burgess, 1976; Labidochromis exasperatus (Burgess, 1976)

= Pearl of Likoma =

Species of fish

The pearl of Likoma (Labidochromis joanjohnsonae) is a species of fish in the family Cichlidae endemic to Lake Malawi where it is native to rocky areas around Likoma Island and it has been introduced to Thumbi West Island. This species can reach a length of 10 centimetres (3.9 in) TL. It can also be found in the aquarium trade. Males are blue, while females are a greenish blue with rows of yellowish spots and shiny gills. They feed on crustaceans, insects, and larvae.

The specific name of this species honours Joan Johnson who was editor of The Aquarist magazine in which the description of this fish was published.

== See also ==
- List of freshwater aquarium fish species
