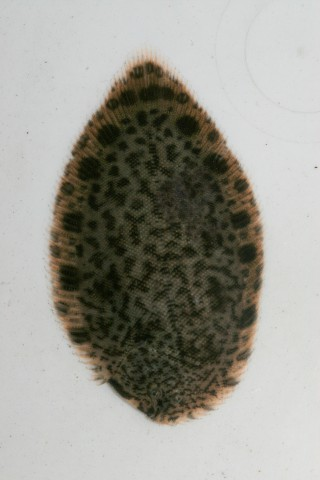
- Achiroides melanorhynchus

Scientific classification
- Domain: Eukaryota
- Kingdom: Animalia
- Phylum: Chordata
- Class: Actinopterygii
- Order: Carangiformes
- Suborder: Pleuronectoidei
- Family: Soleidae
- Genus: Achiroides; Bleeker, 1851

Type species
- Plagusia melanorhynchus Bleeker, 1851

= Achiroides =

Genus of fishes

Achiroides is a genus of small freshwater soles native to Southeast Asia.

== Species ==
There are currently two recognized species in this genus:

- Achiroides leucorhynchos Bleeker, 1851
- Achiroides melanorhynchus (Bleeker, 1850)
