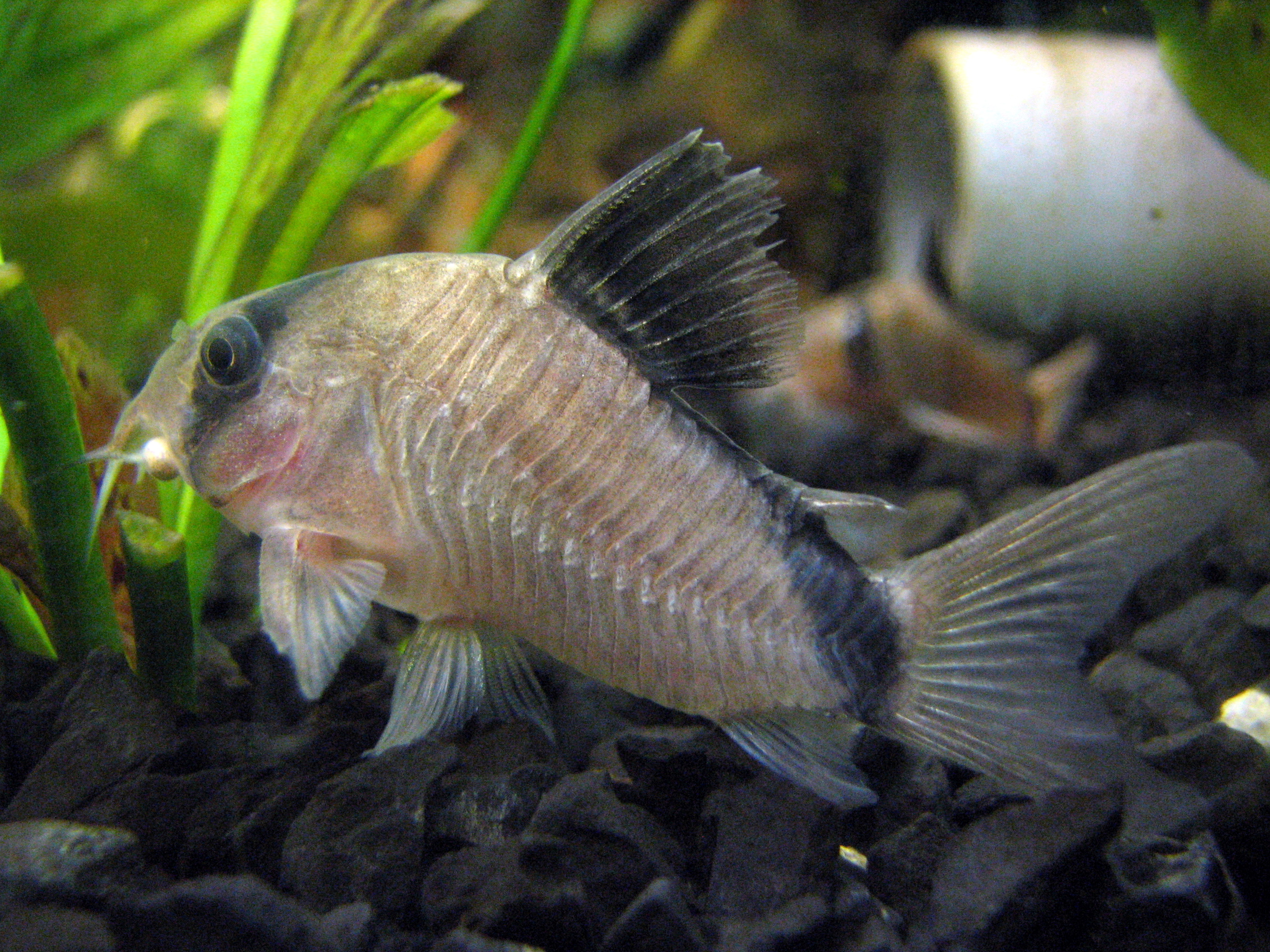

Conservation status
- Vulnerable (IUCN 3.1)

Scientific classification
- Kingdom: Animalia
- Phylum: Chordata
- Class: Actinopterygii
- Order: Siluriformes
- Family: Callichthyidae
- Genus: Corydoras
- Species: C. metae

Binomial name
- Corydoras metae C. H. Eigenmann, 1914

= Masked corydoras =

Species of fish

The masked corydoras, bandit catfish, bandit corydoras, or Meta River corydoras (Corydoras metae) is a tropical freshwater fish belonging to the Corydoradinae sub-family of the family Callichthyidae. It originates in inland waters of South America, and is found in the Meta River basin in Colombia. A maximum length of 4.8 cm has been recorded.

== Physical description ==
Its common name "bandit corydoras" is derived from the "mask" over its eyes. Except for the black area from the dorsal fin down to the caudal peduncle, it has a plain body.

== Aquarium maintenance ==
According to the Encyclopedia of Aquarium and Pond Fish, the masked corydoras must be kept in water that is soft to hard (50–150 mg/L), acidic to neutral (pH 6.0–7.0), and with a temperature range from 22–26 °C (72–79 °F).

In terms of diet, it prefers fresh and thawed live foods. Since it is a bottom feeder, the Encyclopedia of Aquarium and Pond Fish recommends that it be fed pellets that sink rapidly. For conditioning, the Encyclopedia of Aquarium and Pond Fish recommends live foods such as small worms.

== See also ==
- List of freshwater aquarium fish species
