= Blackstripe corydoras =

Conservation status
- Least Concern (IUCN 3.1)

Scientific classification
- Kingdom: Animalia
- Phylum: Chordata
- Class: Actinopterygii
- Order: Siluriformes
- Family: Callichthyidae
- Genus: Hoplisoma
- Species: H. bondi

Binomial name
- Hoplisoma bondi (Gosline, 1940)

Synonyms
- Corydoras bondi Gosline, 1940

Species of fish

The blackstripe corydoras or Bond's catfish (Hoiplisoma bondi) is a species of freshwater ray-finned fish belonging to the subfamily Corydoradinae, the corys, of the family Callichthyidae, the armoured catfishes. This species is found in the Yuruarí River in Venezuela and the Corantijn and Rupununi River basins in Guyana and Suriname. In the system of "C-Numbers" developed by the German fishkeeping magazine DATZ to identify undescribed species of Corydoras in the aquarium hobby, this fish had been assigned number "C31" until it was correctly identified.

The fish will grow in length up to 1.9 in (4.8 cm). It lives in a tropical climate in water with pH of 6.0–8.0, a water hardness of 2–25 dGH, and a temperature range of 72–79 °F (22–26 °C). It feeds on worms, benthic crustaceans, insects, and plant matter. It lays eggs in dense vegetation and adults do not guard the eggs. The female holds 2–4 eggs between her pelvic fins, where the male fertilizes them for about 30 seconds. Only then does the female swim to a suitable spot, where she attaches the very sticky eggs. The pair repeats this process until about 100 eggs have been fertilized and attached.

The blackstripe corydoras is of commercial importance in the aquarium trade industry. The IUCN Red List considers it to be a least-concern species.

== See also ==
- List of freshwater aquarium fish species
