= Eirmotus furvus =

Conservation status
- Least Concern (IUCN 3.1)

Scientific classification
- Kingdom: Animalia
- Phylum: Chordata
- Class: Actinopterygii
- Division: Teleostei
- Order: Cypriniformes
- Family: Cyprinidae
- Genus: Eirmotus
- Species: E. furvus

Binomial name
- Eirmotus furvus Tan & Kottelat, 2008

Species of fish

Eirmotus furvus is a species of freshwater ray-finned fish belonging to the family Cyprinidae, a diverse family which includes the carps, barbs, minnows and related fishes. This is a small species, with a maximum standard length of 3.4 cm (1.3 in), which is endemic to Indonesia where it is found along the eastern coast of Jambi on Sumatra and in the Kumai and Mendawai River basins in Central Kalimantan on Borneo. This species is restricted to the black waters of peat swamp forest and is found only in indisturbed areas deep in such forests. This fish is found in the aquarium trade which may be a cause of overfishing, it is also threatened by habitat loss.
