= Spotfin betta =

Conservation status
- Vulnerable (IUCN 3.1)

Scientific classification
- Kingdom: Animalia
- Phylum: Chordata
- Class: Actinopterygii
- Division: Teleostei
- Order: Anabantiformes
- Family: Osphronemidae
- Genus: Betta
- Species: B. macrostoma

Binomial name
- Betta macrostoma Regan, 1910

Species of fish

The spotfin betta (Betta macrostoma), or the Brunei beauty, is a species of freshwater ray-finned fish belonging to the family Osphronemidae, the gouramis, and the subfamily Macropodusinae, the paradisefishes and fighting fishes. This fish is endemic to northern Borneo in Sarawak and Brunei.

== Taxonomy ==
The spotfin betta was first formally described in 1910 by the British ichthyologist Charles Tate Regan with its type locality given as Sarawak state, Borneo, East Malaysia. This species is classified in the genus Bettaand some authorities classify it in the B. unimaculata species complex. The genus Betta is placed within the subfamily Macropodusinae, which includes the fighting fishes and paradisefishes, which is included in the gourami family Osphronemidae which is the order Anabantiformes. which also includes the snakeheads.

== Etymology ==
The spotfin betta is classified in the genus Betta, a name which is derived from Ikan Wader betta, a local name in Java for B. trifasciata, the type species of the genus. The specific name macrostoma means "long" or "large mouth", a reference to the mouth extending past the centreline of the eye.

== Description ==
The spotfin betta has a long and thin body with the depth of the body at the origin of the dorsal fin being between 18 and 25% of the standard length. It has a long maxilla is long. The caudal fin is rounded and may have elongated iddle rays. The short pelvic fin is filamentous and the dorsal and anal fins are pointed. Males have a red body with a red patch on operculum and there is an ocellus on the dorsal fin. There are no iridescent scales on the operculum. This fish reaches a standard length of 6.7 cm (2.6 in)>

== Distribution and habitat ==
The spotfin betta is only known from Borneo where has only been recorded from Belait District in Brunei Darussalam and North Sarawak in the vicinity of Marudi, Malaysia. This fish is found in acidic clearwater streams, where it typically occurs in shallow, less than 30 cm (12 in) deep, slow-flowing to stagnant pools.

== Biology ==
The spotfin betta is a paternal mouthbrooder, after a lengthy courtship in which the male approaches the female flaring out his fins and gaping his mouth, with the female responding by orienting herself perpendicular to the male and similarly gaping and flaring. The male then entwines his body around that of the female and the eggs and milt are released in batches. Both fishes then pick up fertilised eggs with their mouths but the female transfers these into the male's mouth. The male broods the eggs for about two weeks until the fry hatch.

== Conservation status ==
The spotfin betta has been assessed has Vulnerable by the International Union for Conservation of Nature because it has a small range, there are a number of threats to its habiata and it is overexploited by the aquarium trade. The Sultan of Brunei has reacted to the potential overexploitation of this species by banning its export from Brunei, they are not protected in Sarawak, so that it the likely origin of any wild caught fish still in the trade.
