= Eirmotus octozona =

Conservation status
- Data Deficient (IUCN 3.1)

Scientific classification
- Kingdom: Animalia
- Phylum: Chordata
- Class: Actinopterygii
- Order: Cypriniformes
- Family: Cyprinidae
- Genus: Eirmotus
- Species: E. octozona

Binomial name
- Eirmotus octozona Schultz, 1959

Species of fish

Eirmotus octozona is a species of freshwater ray-finned fish belonging to the family Cyprinidae, a diverse family which includes the carps, barbs, minnows and related fishes. This species is thought to be found in southern Peninsular Malaysia, but its range is uncertain as it is only known from the aquarium trade.

It was first formally described in 1959 by the American ichthyologist Leonard Peter Schultz, with its type locality given as Bueng Boraphet in central Thailand. This is likely to be an error as there is no suitable habitat, peat swamp, for Eirmotus species at this location, and it has not been recorded there since. Like other species in the genus Eirmotus, of which this is the type species, this is a small fish with a maximum published standard length of 3.6 cm (1.4 in).
