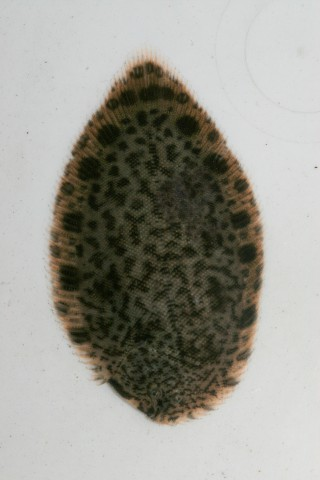

Conservation status
- Least Concern (IUCN 3.1)

Scientific classification
- Kingdom: Animalia
- Phylum: Chordata
- Class: Actinopterygii
- Order: Carangiformes
- Suborder: Pleuronectoidei
- Family: Soleidae
- Genus: Achiroides
- Species: A. melanorhynchus

Binomial name
- Achiroides melanorhynchus (Bleeker, 1850)

Synonyms
- Plagusia melanorhynchus Bleeker, 1850 Achiroides melanorhijnchus (Bleeker, 1850)

= Achiroides melanorhynchus =

Fish species

Achiroides melanorhynchus is a species of sole native to Southeast Asia. It was first described by Pieter Bleeker in 1850. It can grow to 14 cm (5.5 in) standard length.

== Range ==
The species is native to rivers as well as both brackish and marine waters along the coasts of Cambodia, Thailand, Malaysia, and Indonesia. In Mekong, it reaches up to the Khone Falls.
