= Centromochlus perugiae =

Scientific classification
- Kingdom: Animalia
- Phylum: Chordata
- Class: Actinopterygii
- Division: Teleostei
- Order: Siluriformes
- Family: Auchenipteridae
- Genus: Centromochlus
- Species: C. perugiae

Binomial name
- Centromochlus perugiae Steindachner, 1882

Synonyms
- Tatia perugiae (Steindachner, 1882)

Species of fish

Centromochlus perugiae is a species of benthopelagic fish, a member of the Auchenipteridae (driftwood catfish) family. They are widely known as honeycomb catfish or oil catfish because of their striking skin pattern. Honeycomb catfish are under 3 inches (76 mm) fully grown.

== Distribution ==
Their distribution includes Peru, Ecuador and Brazil. They prefer water temperature in the range 26–28 °C (79–82 °F) with pH of 6–7.

== Behavior ==
Honeycomb catfish will anchor themselves into crevices in driftwood and hide. They are mostly nocturnal and seek hiding spaces and shade. In aquariums, honeycomb catfish are not known to bother other inhabitants of a community tank.
