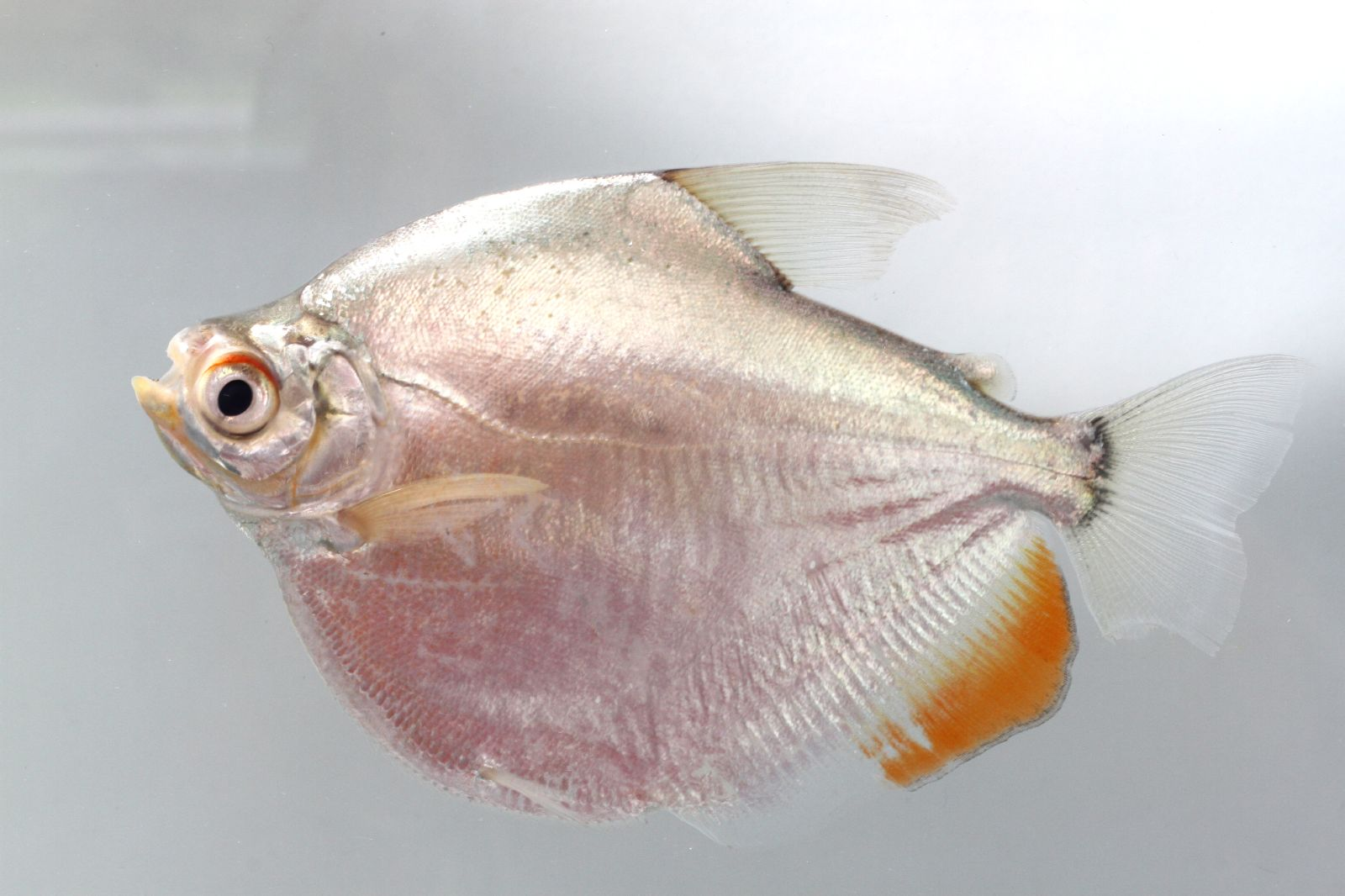

Conservation status
- Least Concern (IUCN 3.1)

Scientific classification
- Kingdom: Animalia
- Phylum: Chordata
- Class: Actinopterygii
- Order: Characiformes
- Family: Serrasalmidae
- Genus: Mylossoma
- Species: M. aureum

Binomial name
- Mylossoma aureum (Spix & Agassiz, 1829)

Synonyms
- Myletes aureus Spix & Agassiz, 1829; Myletes herniarius Cope, 1872; Mylosomma ventriosa Norman, 2929

= Mylossoma aureum =

Species of fish

Mylossoma aureum is a species of freshwater ray-finned fish belonging to the family Serrasalmidae, which includes the piranhas, pacus and related fishes. These fishes are found in the Amazon and Orinoco Basins in South America.

== Taxonomy ==
Mylossoma aureum was first formally described as Myletes aureus in 1829 the type locality was given as the Equatorial rivers of Brazil in Brazil, where the German biologist Johann Baptist von Spix collected the type, with the description being completed and published by the Swiss-American biologist Louis Agassiz. This species is a amber of the genus Mylossoma which is classified within the family Serrasalmidae which belongs to the suborder Characoidei of the order Characiformes.

== Etymology ==
Mylossoma aureum belongs to the genus Mylossoma, this name combines the Greek words mýlos, meaning "mill" or "millstone", with soma, which means "body". This is an allusion to disc-like body shape. The specific name, aureum, means "golden", alluding to the colour of this fish.

== Description ==
Mylossoma aureum diifers from other species in its genus by having a vertebrate count of 38 or 39 and in the last spine on the abodomen being obviously separate from the origin of the anal fin. This species grows to a total length of 20 cm (7.9 in).

== Distribution and habitat ==
Mylossoma aureum is found in the Amazon and Orinoco River basins and in the Japurá River, its range includes parts of Bolivia, Brazil, Colombia, Ecuador, Peru and Venezuela. Its occurrence in Gutyana is yet to be confirmed. This is a migratory, benthopelagic fish which migrates along whitewater rivers and into their associated wetlands.

== Biology ==
Mylossoma aureum is omnivorous, although most of its diet is made up of vegetable matter. This species spawns in the wet season and undertakes migarions to spawn, breeding in the wetlands associated with whitewater rivers. It is a fats growing, fecund fish with a high mortality rate in its early growth stages.

== Utilisation ==
Mylossoma aureum is of some importance to local commercial fisheries, but less so than the closely related M. albiscopum of the same region.
