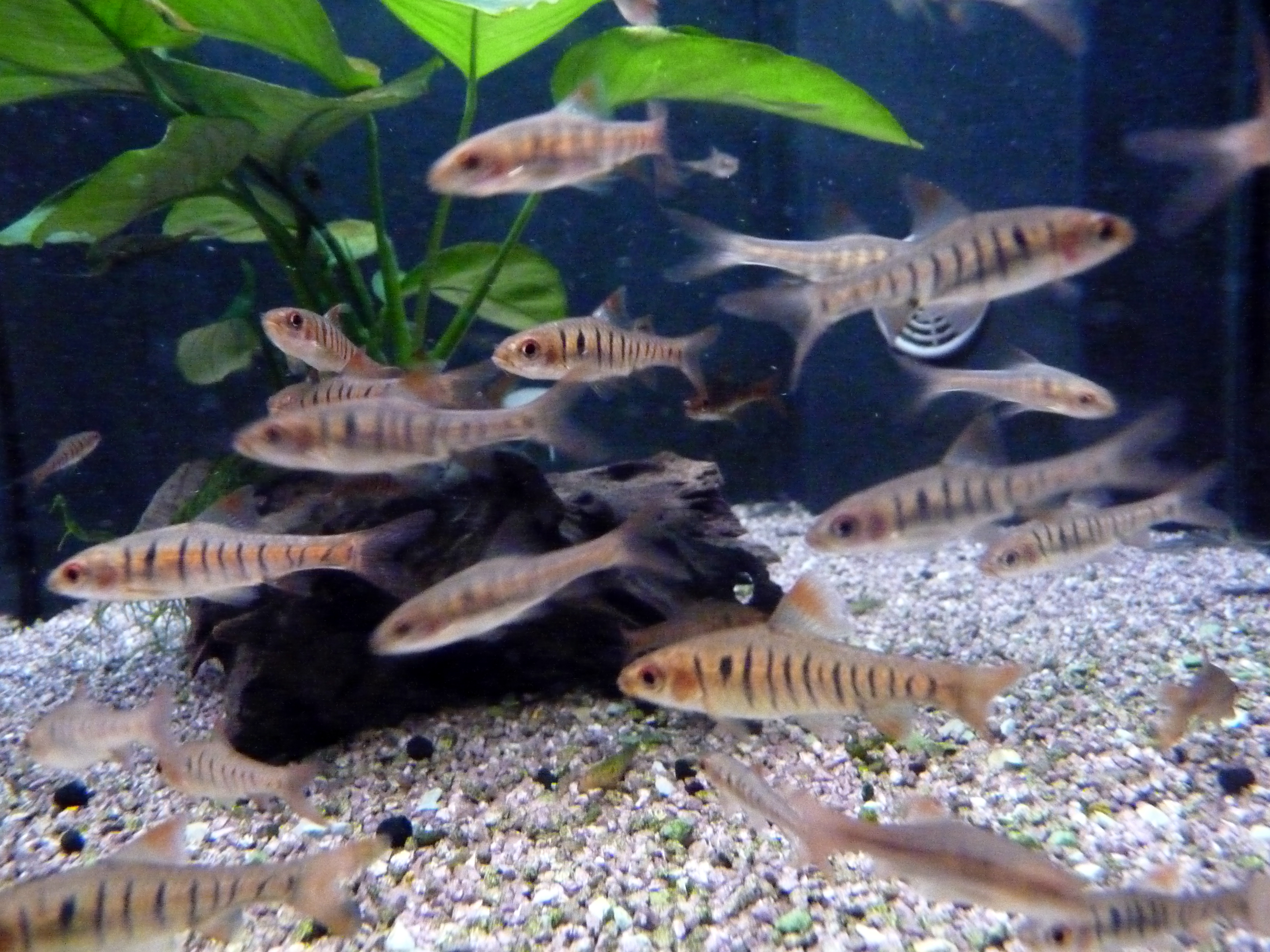

Conservation status
- Least Concern (IUCN 3.1)

Scientific classification
- Kingdom: Animalia
- Phylum: Chordata
- Class: Actinopterygii
- Order: Cypriniformes
- Family: Cyprinidae
- Subfamily: Smiliogastrinae
- Genus: Enteromius
- Species: E. fasciolatus

Binomial name
- Enteromius fasciolatus Günther, 1868

Synonyms
- Barbus fasciolatus Günther, 1858

= African banded barb =

Species of fish

The African banded barb, Angola barb, blue-barred barb or fire barb (Enteromius fasciolatus) is a ray-finned fish species in the family Cyprinidae.

It is found mainly in Angola and Zambia, extending into neighboring Botswana, the Democratic Republic of the Congo, Namibia and Zimbabwe.

Its natural habitats are the upper and middle Zambezi River, the Cunene and Kafue Rivers, the Luapula River and Lake Mweru, the Okavango River, Lake Kariba, and the Zambian Congo River, as well as some of their tributaries.

This species is an aquarium fish of some importance. Lively and peaceful, it does not thrive in high water hardness and needs to be kept in groups.
