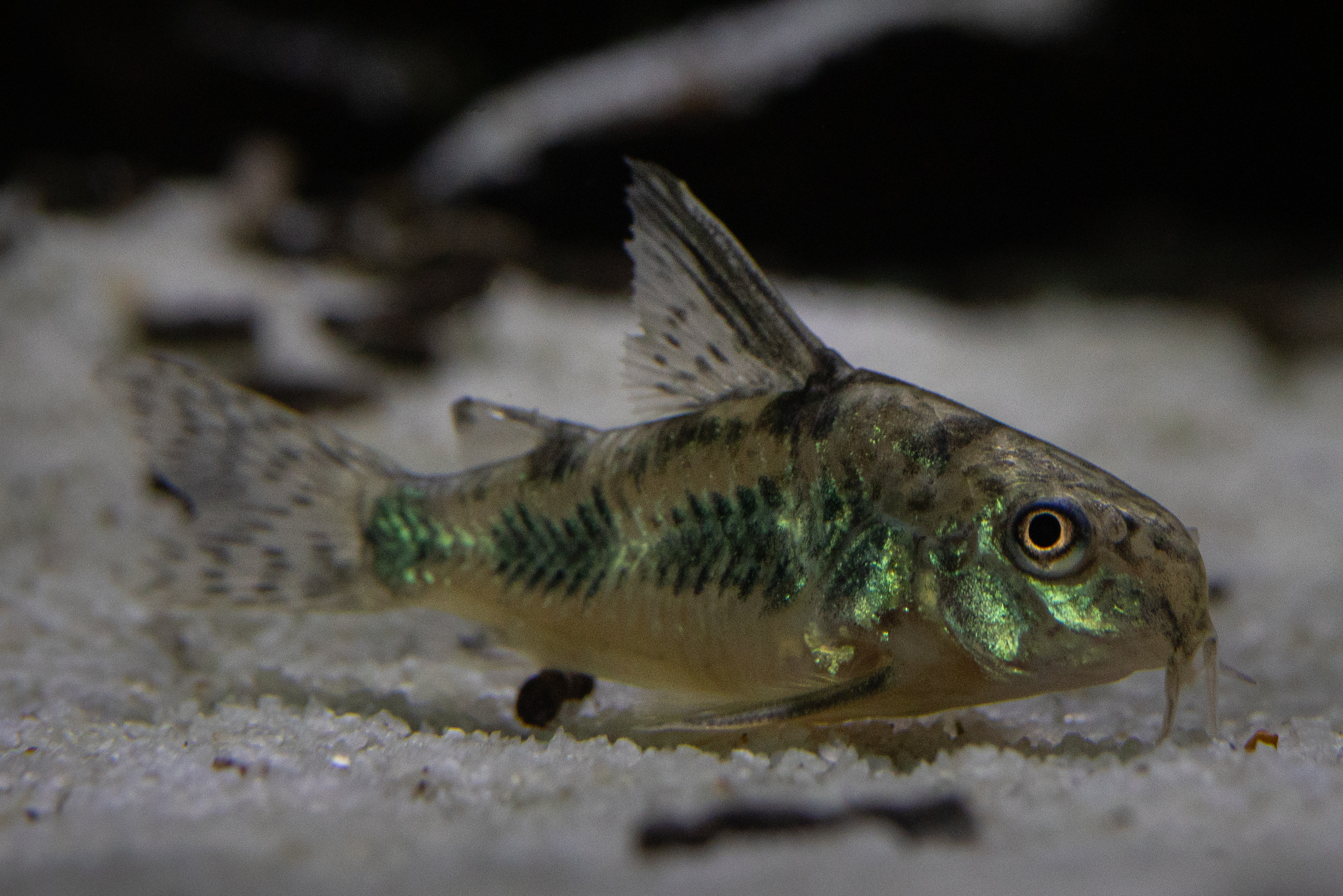

Conservation status
- Least Concern (IUCN 3.1)

Scientific classification
- Kingdom: Animalia
- Phylum: Chordata
- Class: Actinopterygii
- Division: Teleostei
- Order: Siluriformes
- Family: Callichthyidae
- Genus: Hoplisoma
- Species: H. paleatum

Binomial name
- Hoplisoma paleatum (Jenyns, 1842)

Synonyms
- Callichthys paleatus Jenyns, 1842; Corydoras paleatus (Jenyns, 1842); Corydoras maculatus Steindachner, 1879; Corydoras marmoratus Steindachner, 1879; Silurus quadricostatus Larrañaga, 1923; Silurus 7-radiatus Larrañaga, 1923

= Hoplisoma paleatum =

Species of fish

Hoplisoma paleatum, the blue leopard corydoras, mottled corydoras or peppered catfish, is a species of freshwater ray-finned fish belonging to the subfamily Corydoradinae, the corys, of the family Callichthyidae, the armoured catfishes. This catfish is found in southeastern South America.

== Description ==
Hoplisoma paleatum reaches about 5.9–7 centimeters (2.3–2.8 in) SL. The male is smaller than the female, and in proportion to body length, the dorsal fin and pectoral fins are longer on the male than the female.

== Ecology ==
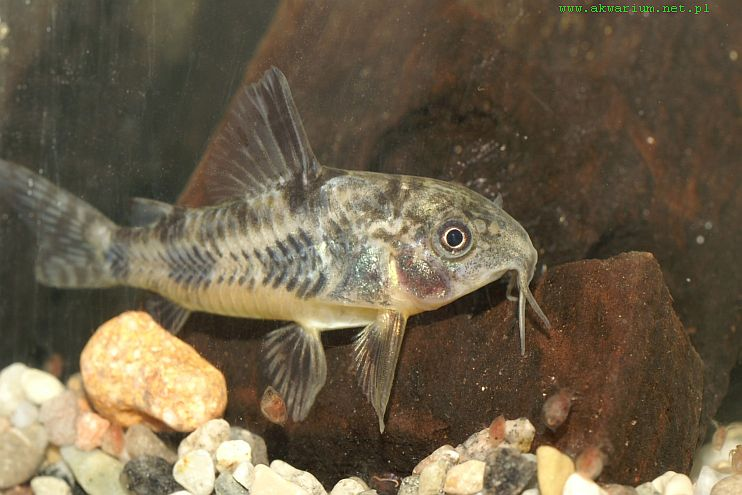
Corydoras paleatus

Hoplisoma paleatum feeds on worms, crustaceans, insects, and plant matter.

H. paleatum has been known to produce sound; it does this by the abduction of its pectoral fins. This is used by males during courtship and intrapersonal communication, and by both sexes and juveniles when distressed.

In reproduction, males do not behave aggressively toward each other, nor do they monopolize mating areas or females. The T-position is involved in courtship, as with many other corydorines.

Charles Darwin discovered H. paleatum when he went to Buenos Aires during his expedition aboard the Beagle during the 1830s.

The fish is a common choice for community aquariums, as it is relatively hardy and peaceful.

== Distribution ==
Hoplisoma paleatum is found in the lower Paraná River basin in Paraguay, Argentina and Brazil and in coastal rivers in Brazil and Uruguay.

== See also ==
- List of freshwater aquarium fish species
- Siluriformes
