= Labidochromis sp. "Mbamba" =

Scientific classification
- Kingdom: Animalia
- Phylum: Chordata
- Class: Actinopterygii
- Order: Cichliformes
- Family: Cichlidae
- Tribe: Haplochromini
- Genus: Labidochromis
- Species: L. sp. "Mbamba"

Binomial name
- Labidochromis sp. "Mbamba"

Labidochromis sp. "Mbamba", or the "yellow top mbamba", is a maternal mouthbrooding cichlid fish from Lake Malawi, so far formally undescribed. They belong to the groups of fishes locally named mbuna which means rock dweller. They are one of the smaller mbuna species growing to 3-4 inches as adults.
