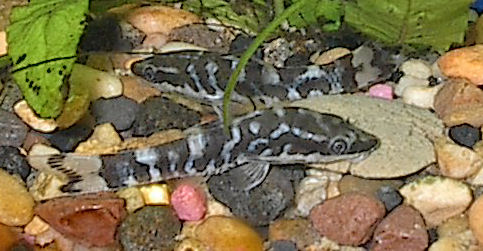

Conservation status
- Endangered (IUCN 3.1)

Scientific classification
- Kingdom: Animalia
- Phylum: Chordata
- Class: Actinopterygii
- Order: Siluriformes
- Family: Loricariidae
- Genus: Otocinclus
- Species: O. cocama

Binomial name
- Otocinclus cocama Reis, 2004

= Zebra oto =

Species of fish

The zebra oto or tiger oto (Otocinclus cocama) is a species of freshwater ray-finned fish belonging to the family Loricariidae, the suckermouth armored catfishes, and the subfamily Hypoptopomatinae, the cascudinhos. This catfish is found in South America, where it is restricted to Peru.

== Taxonomy ==
The zebra oto was described in 2004 from a tributary of the Río Ucayali in Peru. Its closest relatives appear to be O. huaorani, O. bororo, O. mariae, and O. mura, as well as the more recently described species O. batmani.

== Distribution and habitat ==
The zebra oto is known only from its type locality of the Yanayacu Creek, a tributary to the stream of the Cocha Supay in Jenaro Herrera, Requena Province, Loreto Department, Peru. It may be more widepread in the Ucayali and Marañón basins. They associate with marginal vegetation.

== Appearance and anatomy ==
The zebra oto has a general body-shape like other Otocinclus species. They are small, have a suckermouth, and have armor on their bodies.

The zebra oto can be distinguished from all other members of this genus by its vertical stripe-like blotches and its complete lateral line. The zebra oto has the highest number of teeth of any species of Otocinclus. The W mark on its caudal fin distinguishes this fish from all others except for O. batmani. The zebra oto reaches about 4.4 cm (1.7 in) in SL, though the males are smaller.

== Status ==
The zebra oto is listed as endangered by the IUCN Red List due to its limited range and overexploitation for the aquarium trade. Additionally, it is not protected in any part of its range, nor is it listed on CITES. The species has a decreasing population trend in the wild.

== In the aquarium ==
The zebra oto has been for sale in the aquarium trade since the early 1990s. It has been popular since at least 2000. They are an occasionally seen species, and are bred in Asia in good numbers.

== See also ==
- List of freshwater aquarium fish species
