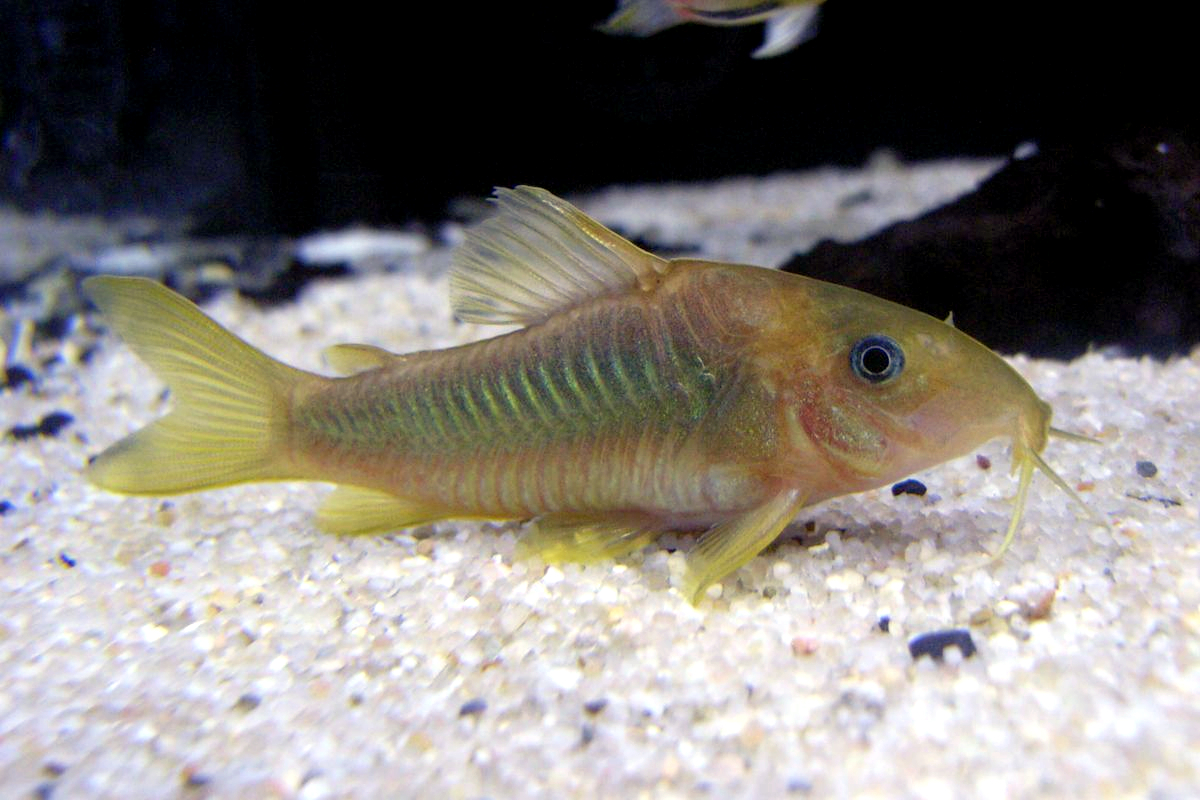
- Corydoras melanotaenia
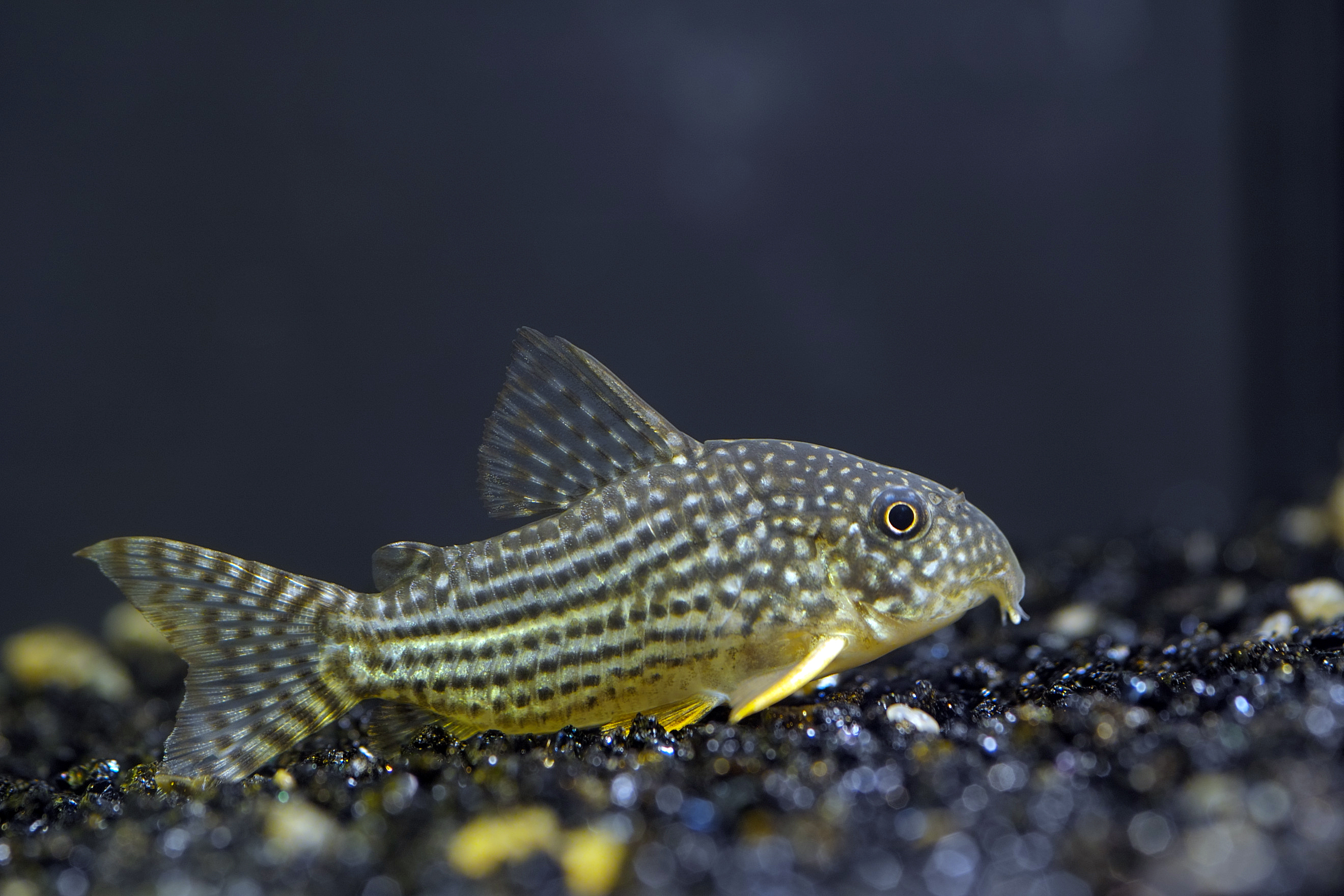
- Corydoras sterbai

Scientific classification
- Kingdom: Animalia
- Phylum: Chordata
- Class: Actinopterygii
- Division: Teleostei
- Order: Siluriformes
- Family: Callichthyidae
- Subfamily: Corydoradinae
- Genus: Corydoras; Lacépède, 1803

Type species
- Corydoras geoffroy Lacépède, 1803

Synonyms
- Cordorinus Rafinesque, 1815; Chaenothorax Cope, 1878

= Corydoras =

Corydoras Temporal range: 58.5–0 Ma Late Paleocene–Present

Genus of fishes

Corydoras is a genus of freshwater ray-finned fish belonging to the family Callichthyidae, commonly referred to as the armoured catfishes, and the subfamily Corydoradinae, the corys. The species usually have more restricted areas of endemism than other callichthyids, but the area of distribution of the entire genus almost equals the area of distribution of the family, except for Panama where Corydoras is not present. Corydoras species are distributed in South America where they can be found from the east of the Andes to the Atlantic coast, from Trinidad to the Río de la Plata drainage in northern Argentina.

Species assigned to Corydoras display a broad diversity of body shapes and coloration. Corydoras are small fish, ranging from 2.5 to 12 cm (1.0 to 4.7 in) in SL, and are protected from predators by their body armor and by their sharp, typically venomous spines.

== Taxonomy ==
The name Corydoras is derived from the Greek kory ("helmet") and doras ("skin"). Corydoras was by far the largest genus of Neotropical fishes with more than 160 species, but has since been split into a number of genera. It is sometimes regarded as being in the tribe Corydoradini, along with Brochis. The type species for this genus is Corydoras geoffroy. Several hundred species are not yet classified, but kept by aquarists. These species are given 'C-numbers', originally devised by Hans-Georg Evers for the German fishkeeping magazine DATZ in 1993. As of February 2014, 158 C-numbers had been assigned, of which 32 had been assigned appropriate scientific names.

The species C. barbatus, C. macropterus and C. prionotos have been reclassified into the genus Scleromystax. Brochis is differentiated from Corydoras due to the higher number of dorsal fin rays; however, Brochis has recently been suggested to be a synonym of Corydoras. This is contested and has not been universally accepted. The sixray corydoras belongs in Aspidoras.

== Ecology ==
Corydoras are generally found in smaller-sized streams, along the margins of larger rivers, in marshes, and in ponds. They are native to slow-moving and almost still (but seldom stagnant) streams and small rivers of South America, where the water is shallow and very murky. Most species are bottom-dwellers, foraging in sand, gravel or detritus. The banks and sides of the streams are covered with a dense growth of plants and this is where the Corydoras are found. They inhabit a wide variety of water types but tend toward soft, neutral to slightly acidic or slightly alkaline pH and 5–10 degrees of hardness. They can tolerate only a small amount of salt (some species tolerate none at all) and do not inhabit environments with tidal influences. They are often seen in shoals. Most species prefer being in groups and many species are found in schools or aggregations of hundreds or even thousands of individuals, usually of a single species, but occasionally with other species mixed in. Unlike most catfishes, which are nocturnal, these species are nocturnal while also being active during the daytime. Corydoras are capable of breathing both water and air, often swimming to the surface to quickly ingest air before re-submerging. The frequency of this air breathing behavior increases when Corydoras are exposed to water with low oxygen availability, allowing them to tolerate periods of aquatic hypoxia.

Their main food is bottom-dwelling insects and insect larvae and various worms, as well as some vegetable matter. Although no Corydoras are piscivorous, they will eat flesh from dead fishes. Their feeding method is to search the bottom with their sensory barbels and suck up food items with their mouth, often burying their snout up to their eyes.

In several species of Corydoras, it has been observed that the fishes, after initial evasive reaction to threat, lie still; this is suggested to be a form of cryptic behavior. However, it is also argued that most species do not have cryptic coloration nor freezing behavior and continue to exist, likely due to their armor and venom. A few species of Otocinclus (O. flexilis, O. mimulus and O. xakriaba) are considered to be Batesian mimics of certain former Corydoras species (H. paleatum, H. diphyes and B. garbei, respectively). These species have bony plates of armor and strong, frequently venomous spines as defenses, making them less palatable; by mimicking these species in size and coloration, Otocinclus avoid predation.

A unique form of insemination has been described in Osteogaster aenea. When these fish reproduce, the male will present his abdomen to the female. The female will attach her mouth to the male's genital opening, creating the well-known "T-position" many Corydoras exhibit during courtship. The female will then drink the sperm. The sperm rapidly moves through her intestines and is discharged together with her eggs into a pouch formed by her pelvic fins. The female can then swim away and deposit the pouch somewhere else alone. Because the T-position is exhibited in other species than just O. aenea, it is likely that this behavior is common in the subfamily.

== In the aquarium ==
The genus is well known among aquarists for its many ornamental species. Corydoras are quite placid and well suited to tropical freshwater community aquariums, as they get along well with most other species and are not aggressive. They are recommended to be kept in shoals of four to six or more. Corydoras are mostly bottom feeders, so they should be offered sinking pellets as well as supplements of live and frozen foods. If flake foods are used, care should be taken to prevent all food from being eaten by faster moving fish at the higher levels of the tank.

Most Corydoras prefer water with a slightly basic pH between 7 and 8, and temperatures between 72–78 °F (22–26 °C) They do not do well in fish tanks with high nitrate levels. This ion leads to the infection of the barbels, which will shorten and become useless. The barbels may also be affected by constant contact with a sharp substrate. Contrary to popular belief, these fish can be kept in a tank with gravel without affecting their barbels, as long as there are no sharp edges on the gravel, although they do prefer sand substrate. They are more likely to thrive if there is an open area of substrate on the bottom of the tank where they can obtain submerged food. It is a myth that salt cannot be used on this species of fish as a means of parasite medication. Salt can be added to the water of the Corydoras catfish in order to rid the fish of ich infection. These fish are fairly easy to keep, being peaceful, hardy, active and entertaining. Occasionally they will dart to the surface, sticking their snout above the water for an instant to take a breath of air. This behavior is perfectly normal and is not an indication that anything is wrong with the fish. However, if this is done in excess, it can indicate poor water conditions.

Where investigated, Corydoras species have been shown to be diurnal and crepuscular rather than nocturnal and activity can even peak at twilight. Corydoras are a very popular choice for a community aquarium and are widely kept throughout the world. Between the years of 2006 and 2015, over 8,600,000 Corydoras were exported from the state of Amazonas, accounting for roughly 6.06% of the state's ornamental fish exports during this time. Their longevity in the aquarium is noteworthy; C. aeneus is said to have lived 27 years in captivity and 20 years is not uncommon.

== Species ==
Corydoras contains the following valid species:

- Corydoras acutus Cope, 1872
- Corydoras amapaensis Nijssen, 1972
- Corydoras areio Knaack, 2000
- Corydoras aurofrenatus C. H. Eigenmann & Kennedy, 1903
- Corydoras blochi Nijssen, 1971
- Corydoras caramater Tencatt, Couto, Santos & Sousa, 2024
- Corydoras cervinus Rössel, 1962
- Corydoras coriatae Burgess, 1997
- Corydoras cortesi Castro, 1987
- Corydoras desana Lima & Sazima, 2017
- Corydoras ellisae Gosline, 1940
- Corydoras filamentosus Nijssen & Isbrücker, 1983
- Corydoras fowleri Böhlke, 1950
- Corydoras fulleri Tencatt, Santos, Evers & Britto, 2021
- Corydoras geoffroy Lacépède, 1803
- Corydoras iiap Tencatt, Ruiz-Tafur & Chuctaya, 2024
- Corydoras maculifer Nijssen & Isbrücker, 1971
- Corydoras narcissus Nijssen & Isbrücker, 1980
- Corydoras negro Knaack, 2004
- Corydoras ourastigma Nijssen, 1972
- Corydoras oxyrhynchus Nijssen & Isbrücker, 1967
- Corydoras pastazensis Weitzman, 1963
- Corydoras saramaccensis Nijssen, 1970
- Corydoras sarareensis Dinkelmeyer, 1995
- Corydoras semiaquilus Weitzman, 1964
- Corydoras septentrionalis Gosline, 1940
- Corydoras serratus Sands, 1995
- Corydoras simulatus Weitzman & Nijssen, 1970
- Corydoras solox Nijssen & Isbrücker, 1983
- Corydoras spilurus Norman, 1926
- Corydoras stenocephalus C. H. Eigenmann & Allen, 1942
- Corydoras treitlii Steindachner, 1906
- Corydoras vittatus Nijssen, 1971
- Corydoras zawadzkii Tencatt & Ohara, 2016

== See also ==
- List of Corydoras species
- List of freshwater aquarium fish species
