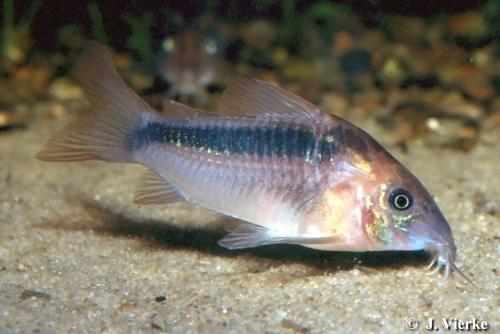

Conservation status
- Least Concern (IUCN 3.1)

Scientific classification
- Kingdom: Animalia
- Phylum: Chordata
- Class: Actinopterygii
- Order: Siluriformes
- Family: Callichthyidae
- Genus: Osteogaster
- Species: O. rabauti

Binomial name
- Osteogaster rabauti (LaMonte, 1941)

Synonyms
- Cortydoras rabauti LaMonte, 1941; Corydoras myersi P. Miranda-Ribeiro, 1942

= Osteogaster rabauti =

Species of armoured catfish

Osteogaster rabauti, also known as the rust corydoras, or Rabaut's corydoras is a small species of tropical freshwater armoured catfish native to the Upper Amazon, Solimões, and Rio Negro basins in South America. It was first described by the American ichthyologist Francesca Raimonde La Monte in 1941, and is frequently seen in the aquarium trade.

== Naming and etymology ==
Osteogaster rabauti is known and sold by a wide variety of common names, including the rust corydoras, Rabaut's corydoras, Myers's corydoras, dwarf corydoras, iridescent corydoras, orange-red corydoras, Rabaut's catfish, rusty cory, Rabaut's cory, and iridescent cory.

== Morphology and physiology ==
=== Description ===
Osteogaster rabauti is a small species of catfish, with adults typically growing to a length of 55 millimetres (2.2 in) to 65 millimetres (2.6 in). It is sexually dimorphic, with sexually mature females tending to grow larger, broader, and deeper-bodied than males. As with all corys, O. rabauti is completely scaleless, and is instead covered with bony plates known as scutes.

=== Coloration ===
The body of Osteogaster rabauti is a rusty orange hue, lending it the common name "rust corydoras". It has a large black stripe in the dorsal portion of its body, which extends to the ventral portion of the caudal peduncle. This allows it to be distinguished from the visually similar species Osteogaster zygatus, as O. zygatus's stripe is only present on the dorsal portion of its body.

=== Venom ===
Like several other related species, such as Hoplisoma adolfoi and H. panda, Osteogaster rabauti secretes a mild venom from the axillary glands at the base of each pectoral-fin spine in order to protect itself from predators. When stiffened, these spines are capable of penetrating human skin and causing significant pain in conjunction with the venom.

== Distribution and habitat ==
Osteogaster rabauti is native to the Upper Amazon, Solimões, and Rio Negro basins in South America. It is found in a pH range of 6.0 to 8.0, in depths between 2 metres (6.6 ft) and 25 metres (82 ft), and in tropical temperatures of 25 °C (77 °F) to 27 °C (81 °F). It primarily inhabits floodplain lakes, oxbow lakes, and riverine habitats. While the full extent of its distribution is somewhat unclear, it is known to inhabit Brazil and Peru, and possibly Colombia as well. The type locality is a "tributary of [the] Amazon River, 7 days by river boat from Manaus, 3°06’S, 60°00’W, Amazonas, Brazil".

Osteogaster rabauti is also known to have been introduced to the Philippines as an ornamental fish in 1996. However, it is unknown whether it has successfully established itself in the years following, and if so, what impact it has on the environment, if any.

== Ecology ==
=== Behavior ===
Osteogaster rabauti is a peaceful and gregarious fish, and well-suited to a community aquarium. Care should be taken not to house them with aggressive fish, as they may get harmed by O. rabauti's venomous spines if they try to nip them.

An unusual behavior that Osteogaster rabauti exhibits is occasionally rising to surface of the water and taking in gulps of air before submerging. This is not necessarily indicative of oxygen deprivation, but rather because O. rabauti and other corys are facultative air-breathers, similar to Siamese fighting fish and tarpon. They possess a heavily modified intestine, which allows them to take in atmospheric oxygen and survive in low-oxygen environments.

=== Diet ===
Osteogaster rabauti is an omnivore, and primarily feeds on zoobenthos, such as small worms, crustaceans, and insects; as well as freshwater detritus and plant matter. In the aquarium, it will readily accept most sinking dry foods, as well as live or frozen brine shrimp, bloodworms, and Tubifex worms.

=== Reproduction ===
Osteogaster rabauti is a brood hider, meaning that it hides its eggs, but does not guard or care for them after. When breeding, the female fish will hold two to four eggs between her pelvic fins, while the male fertilizes them. This can take up to 30 seconds, after which the female will hide them in a suitable location, usually by attaching them to the spot in question. This process will be repeated until about 100 eggs are fertilized and attached to the hiding place.

In the aquarium, Osteogaster rabauti breeds similarly to other corys, such as O. aeneus. In order to facilitate breeding, a sex ratio of two males to one female is recommended. When females are visibly gravid, a large water change (50–70%) with cooler water should be performed daily until the eggs hatch, and oxygenation and flow should be increased. C. aeneus eggs are often deposited on aquarium glass and among fine-leaved vegetation. It is recommended to place a spawning mop in the aquarium in order to facilitate the easy removal of eggs, as C. rabauti will also readily deposit its eggs on them.

Once spawning is complete, all eggs should be moved to a separate tank in order to avoid predation. This tank should have the same water as the tank the eggs were spawned in, and should have similar levels of oxygenation as well. Incubation takes place for 3–4 days, after which the eggs will hatch. When the fry fully absorb their yolk sacs, it is recommended to feed them small live food such as brine shrimp and microworms.

== Relationship with humans ==
=== Conservation status ===
It has not been evaluated by the IUCN Red List, and is of no interest to commercial fisheries. It is, however, frequently seen in the aquarium trade.

=== In the aquarium ===
Like other corys, O. rabauti is a common sight within the aquarium trade. A minimum tank size of 90 x 30 cm is recommended, as they should ideally be kept in shoals of at least four to six individuals. The ideal water conditions are a temperature range of 20 °C (68 °F) to 27 °C (81 °F), a pH of 5.5 to 7.2, and a hardness of 18 to 215 ppm. The ideal substrate is fine sand, but rounded gravel is an acceptable alternative, provided that it is regularly cleaned.
