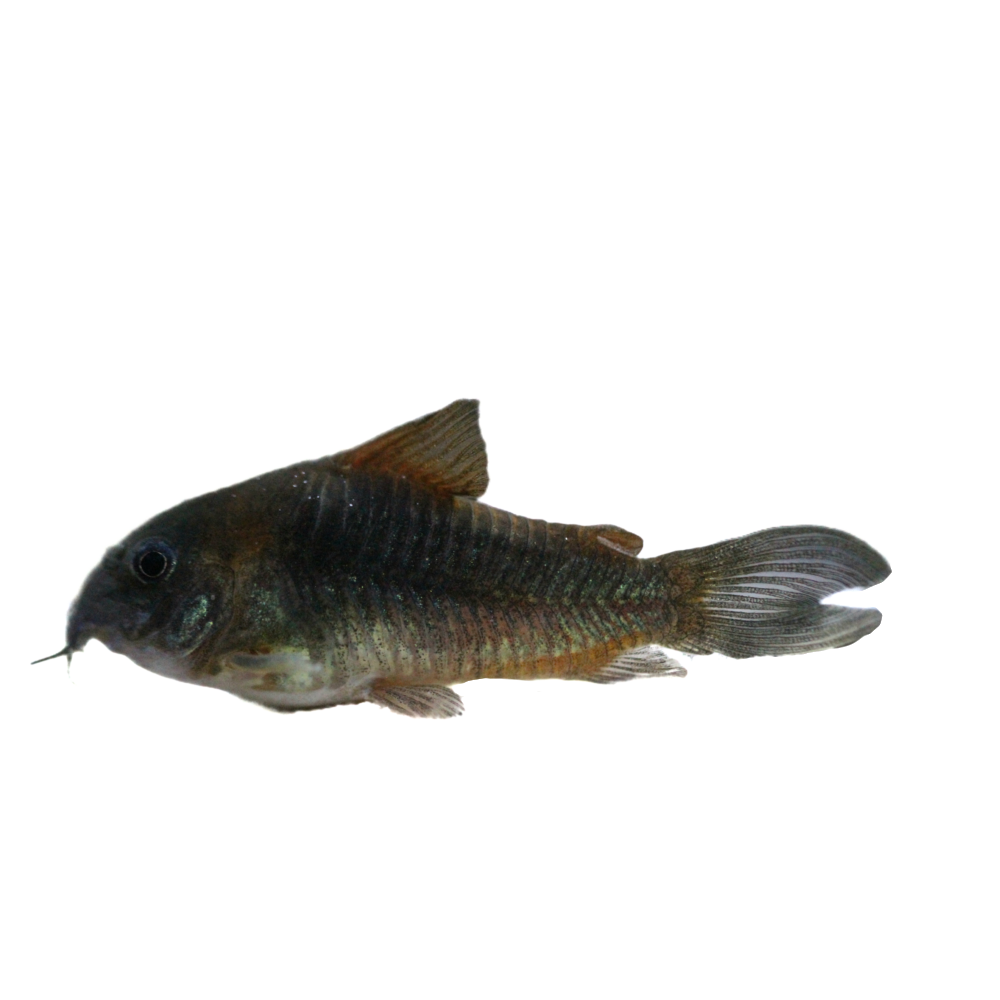
- Osteogaster eques

Scientific classification
- Kingdom: Animalia
- Phylum: Chordata
- Class: Actinopterygii
- Order: Siluriformes
- Family: Callichthyidae
- Subfamily: Corydoradinae
- Genus: Osteogaster; Cope, 1894

Type species
- Corydoras eques Steindachner, 1876

Species
- See text

= Osteogaster =

Genus of fishes

Osteogaster is a genus of catfish in the subfamily Corydoradinae, family Callichthyidae of the order Siluriformes. Before the recent resurrection of the genus, these species had been grouped in the genus Corydoras.

== Taxonomy ==
Osteogaster was erected by Edward Drinker Cope in 1894. Before 2024, it was considered defunct by most scientific authorities, being considered as a junior synonym or subgenus of Corydoras. It was formally resurrected and revalidated in a phylogenomic analysis carried out in 2024.

== Etymology ==
The generic name, Osteogaster, is derived from the Greek ὀστέον, ostéon, meaning "bone:, and γαστήρ, gastḗr, meaning "belly", referring to the coracoid bones of O. eques which completely enclose the ventral region.

== Morphology ==
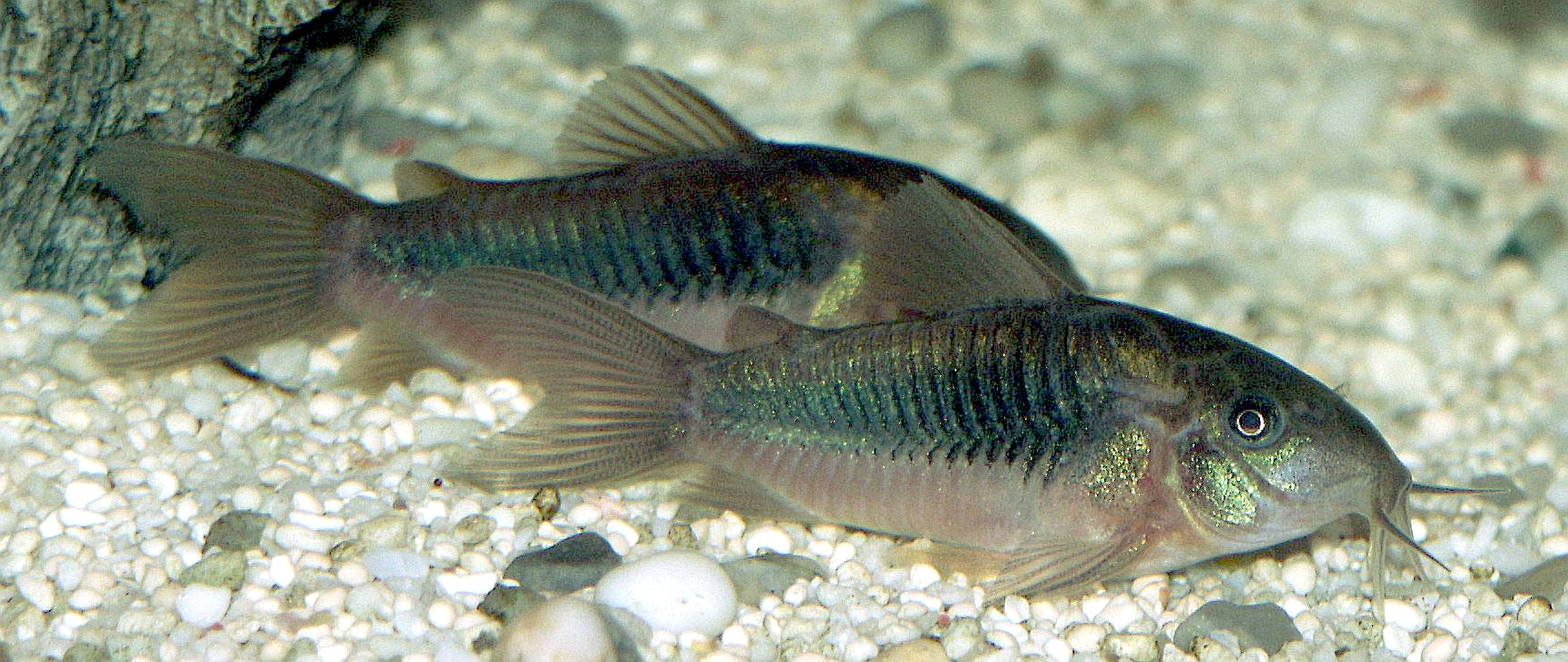
Osteogaster aenea

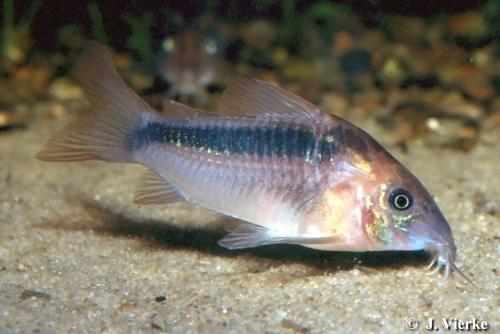
Osteogaster rabauti

The basic color of species of the genus Osteogaster is yellowish-orange to reddish-orange, and there is a single large dark spot on the sides of the body. The fins are usually unspotted. Osteogaster species differ from all other armoured catfishes in the following characteristics, among others:

- The mesethmoid, a skull bone, is small to medium-sized. In Gastrodermus, the mesethmoid is noticeably short. In Corydoras, it is large, and in Brochis, it is very large.
- The posterior edge of the pectoral fin spine is usually provided with serrations, which are perpendicular or arranged at right angles to the spine. In Brochis, Corydoras, Gastrodermus, and Scleromystax, these serrations are directed toward the base of the pectoral fin spine.

== Species ==
As of September 2025, there are currently eight extant species in this genus (as recognized by Eschmeyer's Catalog of Fishes):

- Osteogaster aenea (T. N. Gill, 1858) (Bronze corydoras)
- Osteogaster eques (Steindachner, 1876)
- Osteogaster hephaestus (Ohara, Tencatt & Britto, 2016) (Fireball cory)
- Osteogaster maclurei (Tencatt, Gomes & Evers, 2023)
- Osteogaster melanotaenia (Regan, 1912) (Green gold catfish)
- Osteogaster oharai Tencatt, Carvalho, Silva & Britto, 2025
- Osteogaster rabauti (La Monte, 1941) (Rusty corydoras)
- Osteogaster zygata (C. H. Eigenmann & Allen, 1942) (Black band catfish)

Incertae sedis

- Osteogaster macrosteus (Regan, 1912)
- Osteogaster microps (Eigenmann & Kennedy, 1903)
- Osteogaster schultzei (Holly, 1940)
- Osteogaster venezuelanus (Ihering, 1911)
