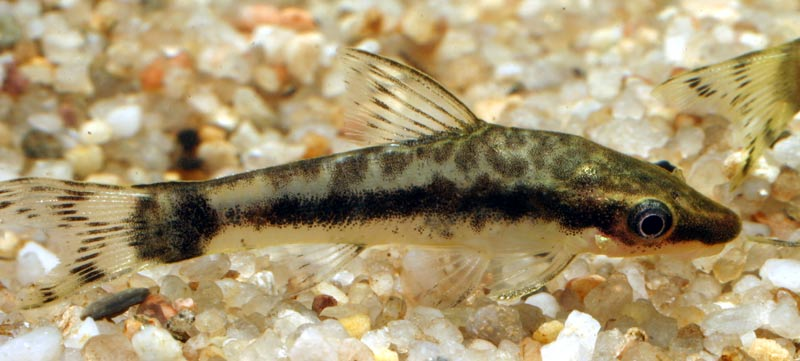

Conservation status
- Least Concern (IUCN 3.1)

Scientific classification
- Kingdom: Animalia
- Phylum: Chordata
- Class: Actinopterygii
- Order: Siluriformes
- Family: Loricariidae
- Subfamily: Hypoptopomatinae
- Genus: Otocinclus
- Species: O. macrospilus

Binomial name
- Otocinclus macrospilus C. H. Eigenmann & Allen, 1942

= Otocinclus macrospilus =

Species of catfish

Otocinclus macrospilus, the tailspotted oto, dwarf otocinclus or dwarf sucker, is a species of freshwater ray-finned fish in the armored catfish family Loricariidae. It is native to South America, where it is found in the upper Amazon basin in Colombia, Ecuador and Peru.

== Size ==
This species reaches a standard length of 3.5 cm (1.4 in).

== Human interactions ==
The tailspotted oto is one of the commoner species of Otocinclus found in the aquarium trade, where it is frequently mislabeled as O. affinis or O. vittatus. It has been bred in captivity, but most specimens remain wild-caught.
