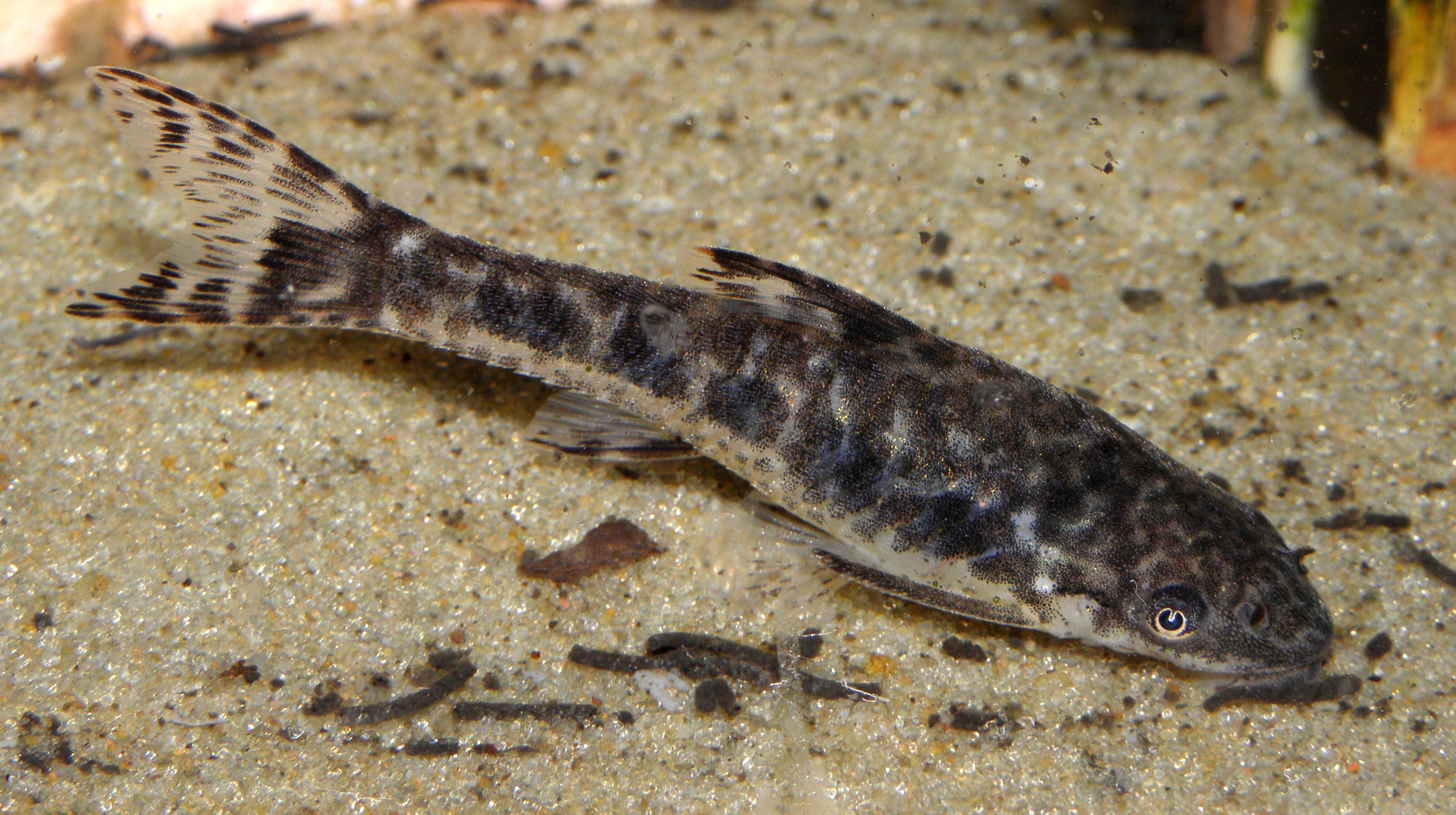
- Otocinclus arnoldi

Scientific classification
- Kingdom: Animalia
- Phylum: Chordata
- Class: Actinopterygii
- Order: Siluriformes
- Family: Loricariidae
- Subfamily: Hypoptopomatinae
- Genus: Otocinclus; Cope, 1871

Type species
- Otocinclus vestitus Cope, 1872

Synonyms
- Macrotocinclus Isbrücker & Seidel, 2001

= Otocinclus =

Genus of fishes

Otocinclus is a genus of freshwater ray-finned fish belonging to the family Loricariidae, the suckermouth armoured catfishes, and the subfamily Hypoptopomatinae, the cascudinhos. The catfishes in this genus are found in South America. These catfishes are commonly known as "dwarf suckers" or "otos". This genus, like other loricariids, is characterized by rows of armour plating covering the body, as well as the underslung suckermouth. They are generally small in size; O. tapirape is the smallest of the species (2.4 cm), while O. flexilis is the biggest (5.5 cm). These species have adaptations that allow them to breathe air. A duct forms at the junction between the esophagus and the stomach and expands into an enlarged, ring-like diverticulum, characteristic of this genus, which allows air-breathing. Otocinclus are popular aquarium fish, and they are often purchased as algae eaters. It is difficult to breed them in captivity, and mostly wild caught Otocinclus are available to hobbyists. This genus is widely distributed east of the Andes of South America, throughout the lowlands from northern Venezuela to northern Argentina, but are generally absent from the Amazon and the Orinoco lowlands.

== Etymology ==
The Otocinclus name is derived from the Greek oto, meaning ear and the Latin cinclus, meaning a latticework, an allusion to the holes in the head in the region of the ear.

== Taxonomy ==
Otocinclus is the most basal genus of the tribe Hypoptopomatini of the subfamily Hypoptopomatinae. However, phylogenetic relationships are currently under study and this genus may eventually be relocated. Its monophyly is supported by seven derived features. O. batmani, O. bororo, O cocama, O. huaorani, O. mariae and O. mura form a monophyletic group within this genus. A monophyletic group is also formed by O. flexilis, O. mimulus and O. xakriaba, which all share mimicry as a synapomorphy. Eschmeyer's Catalog of Fishes does not recognize tribes and so only places this genus in the Hypoptopomatinae.

== Species ==
Otocinclus contains the following valid species:

- Otocinclus affinis Steindachner, 1877
- Otocinclus arnoldi Regan, 1909
- Otocinclus batmani Lehmann A., 2006
- Otocinclus bororo Schaefer, 1997
- Otocinclus caxarari Schaefer, 1997
- Otocinclus cocama Reis, 2004
- Otocinclus flexilis Cope, 1894
- Otocinclus hasemani Steindachner, 1915
- Otocinclus hoppei A. Miranda-Ribeiro, 1939
- Otocinclus huaorani Schaefer, 1997
- Otocinclus juruenae Ribeiro & Lehmann A. 2016
- Otocinclus macrospilus C.H. Eigenmann & W. R. Allen, 1942
- Otocinclus mariae Fowler, 1940
- Otocinclus mimulus Axenrot & S. O. Kullander, 2003
- Otocinclus mura Schaefer, 1997
- Otocinclus tapirape Britto & Moreira, 2002
- Otocinclus vestitus Cope, 1872
- Otocinclus vittatus Regan, 1904
- Otocinclus xakriaba Schaefer, 1997

== Ecology ==
Species of this genus are diurnal and generally are found in small streams or along the margins of larger rivers, clinging to substrates using their suckermouth. The fish of this genus primarily feed on algae or aufwuchs on roots, stones, macrophytes and broad-leaved grasses. They inhabit well-oxygenated, moderate- to slow-flowing environments, often near river banks. They are found near the surface of the water, but are often associated with vegetation or other structures. They lay adhesive eggs and do not guard them; this is in contrast to many other loricariids where the male builds a nest and guards the eggs. These fish live in shoals or schools. Otocinclus are able to breathe air. Prior to surfacing, they will release air through their gills and mouth. Upon returning to the bottom, the fish do not need to pump their buccal cavities, indicating they are absorbing oxygen from the swallowed air.

O. flexilis, O. mimulus and O. xakriaba are considered to be Batesian mimics of certain former Corydoras species (H. paleatum (formerly C. paleatus), H. diphyes (formerly C. diphyes) and B. garbei (formerly C. garbei), respectively). These species have bony plates of armor and strong spines as defenses, making them less palatable; by mimicking these species in size and coloration, Otocinclus spp. avoid predation.
