= Xakriabá (disambiguation) =

Xakriabá may refer to:

- Xakriabá people
- Xakriabá language
- Otocinclus xakriaba, a species of catfish
- Célia Xakriabá indigenous educational activists
