= Otocinclus mimulus =

Conservation status
- Near Threatened (IUCN 3.1)

Scientific classification
- Kingdom: Animalia
- Phylum: Chordata
- Class: Actinopterygii
- Order: Siluriformes
- Family: Loricariidae
- Genus: Otocinclus
- Species: O. mimulus

Binomial name
- Otocinclus mimulus Axenrot & S. O. Kullander, 2003

Species of fish

Otocinclus mimulus is a species of freshwater ray-finned fish belonging to the family Loricariidae, the suckermouth armored catfishes, and the subfamily Hypoptopomatinae, the cascudinhos. This catfish is found in South America, where it is found in small tributaries of the Monday river, itself a right bank tributary of the Paraná river in Paraguay. This species reaches a standard length of 4.3 cm (1.7 in).

Otocinclus mimulus is a Batesian mimic of Hoplisoma diphyes. H. diphyes is inedible to many species due to its bony armor and so individual O. mimulus that look more similar to H. diphyes are less likely to be eaten by predators like Saxatilia lepidota. O. mimulus is named for its mimicry of H. diphyes.
