= Ian A. M. Fuller =

English aquarist

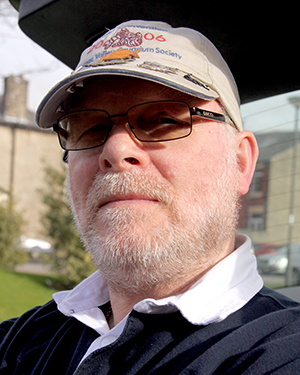
- Born: 21 February 1946 (age 80); Birmingham, West Midlands, England
- Occupations: Aquarist, toolmaker
- Children: 2
- Writing career
- Period: 1970–present
- Website: corydorasworld.com

Ian Alexander McDonald Fuller (born 21 February 1946) is an English aquarist and ichthyologist.

== Personal life ==
Fuller was born in Birmingham in 1946. His mother was from Scotland and his father from Norwich. He has two children and lives in Warwickshire. Fuller worked in toolmaking for much of his professional life and has admitted to becoming a self-confessed Corydoras addict in the 1970s. Fuller is related to the Baptist minister Andrew Fuller, being his fourth great grand-nephew.

== Career and life as an aquarist ==
In around 1970, Fuller became interested in keeping tropical fish and this quickly developed into several tanks set up in his spare room. Beginning with a variety of fish, he began taking an increasing interest in the practice and method of care and breeding for the variety of species he kept. He began with South American Cichlids, before going on to Barbs, Anabantids and Characins.

It was not until 1973 that Fuller notes his interest in corydoras took off and from 1974 he has been an active breeder of the species. By 1977, Fuller had sectioned off his garage with 36 individual tanks where he bred and cared for a variety of species. He is currently in his third fish house.

Fuller has been extensive on the Corydoras scene of aquarists throughout the UK and runs the knowledgebase and website CorydorasWorld.com. Throughout his time as an aquarist, he has been key speakers at conventions and conferences on the breeding and identification of Corydoras and has also served as chairperson and president of the Catfish Study Group. He has organised Cory-Vention and Cory-Fest. Fuller also administrates the CW-Coding process.

=== South America ===
Fuller has been actively involved in research and an adventure tourism business in South America with GoWildPeru. Fuller's work in South America has focused on searching for catfish species in the Madre de Dios River and surrounding areas having successfully contributed to the study. Corydoras fulleri is named in honour of Fuller, in recognition of how he has devoted most of his life to keeping and breeding Corydoradinae species.

Fuller has also diversified his research interests and has produced two accounts of the orchids species of south eastern Peru.

== Bibliography ==
Year	Work	Notes
2001	Breeding Corydoradinae Catfishes	
2005	Identifying Corydoradinae Catfish	Written with Hans-Georg Evers
2011	Identifying Corydoradinae Catfish - Supplement 1	Written with Hans-Georg Evers
2012	Breeding Corydoradinae Catfishes - 2nd Ed.	
2019	Orchid Species of South Eastern Peru: Flowering - February	
2019	Orchid Species of South Eastern Peru: Flowering - November - December	
2026	Breeding Corydoradinae Catfishes - 3rd Ed.	
