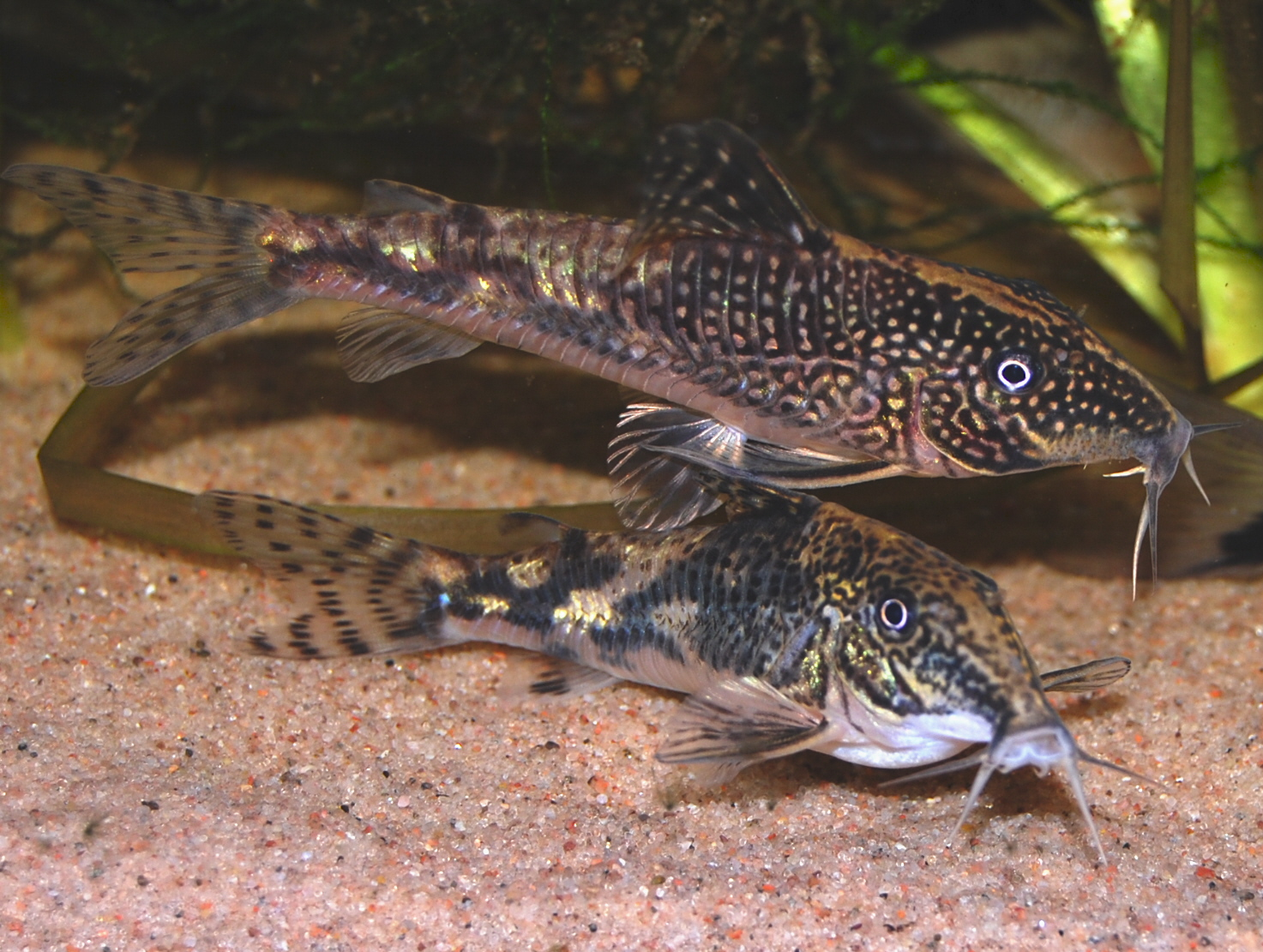
- Photo: Birger A

Conservation status
- Least Concern (IUCN 3.1)

Scientific classification
- Kingdom: Animalia
- Phylum: Chordata
- Class: Actinopterygii
- Order: Siluriformes
- Family: Callichthyidae
- Genus: Scleromystax
- Species: S. barbatus

Binomial name
- Scleromystax barbatus (Quoy & Gaimard, 1824)

Synonyms
- Callichthys barbatus Quoy & Gaimard, 1824; Corydoras barbatus (Quoy & Gaimard, 1824); Corydoras eigenmanni Ihering, 1907; Corydoras kronei Miranda-Ribeiro, 1907

= Banded corydoras =

Species of fish

The banded corydoras or bearded catfish (Scleromystax barbatus) is a subtropical freshwater fish belonging to the subfamily Corydoradinae of the family Callichthyidae. It originates in coastal drainages in South America from Rio de Janeiro to Santa Catarina, Brazil.

== Taxonomy ==
It was originally described as Callichthys barbatus by Jean René Constant Quoy & Joseph Paul Gaimard in 1824, from which it was transferred to genus Corydoras as Corydoras barbatus, a name which by which it is still being referred to in the aquarium industry. The species was further transferred to genus Scleromystax in 2003.

== Description ==
The fish will grow in length up to 9.8 centimetres (3.9 in). This species has pronounced sexual dimorphism. The dorsal and pectoral fins of males reach, or almost reach, the caudal peduncle, and well-developed odontodes are inserted in fleshy tissue on a large area on the sides of the snout in fully grown males.

== Habitat and ecology ==
The banded corydoras lives in a subtropical climate in water with a 6.0–8.0 pH, a water hardness of 2–25 dGH, and a temperature of 68 °F (20 °C) to 82 °F (28 °C). It feeds on worms, benthic crustaceans, insects, and plant matter. It lays eggs in dense vegetation and adults do not guard the eggs. In captivity, as the sperm are released the female sinks to the bottom, resting on one of her pectoral fins while she starts fanning with the other pectoral fin. At this time, some eggs are released which fall into the pelvic fin basket and are apparently fertilized at that time.

== In the aquarium ==
The banded corydoras is of commercial importance in the aquarium trade industry. Though peaceful, they get larger than most Corydoras and are therefore less suitable for small aquaria.

== See also ==
- List of freshwater aquarium fish species
