= Otocinclus juruenae =

Conservation status
- Data Deficient (IUCN 3.1)

Scientific classification
- Kingdom: Animalia
- Phylum: Chordata
- Class: Actinopterygii
- Order: Siluriformes
- Family: Loricariidae
- Genus: Otocinclus
- Species: O. juruenae

Binomial name
- Otocinclus juruenae A. C. Ribeiro & Lehmann A., 2016

Species of Actinopterygii

Otocinclus juruenae is a species of freshwater ray-finned fish belonging to the family Loricariidae, the suckermouth armored catfishes, and the subfamily Hypoptopomatinae, the cascudinhos. This catfish is found in South America, where it is endemic to the Juruena river in the Brazilian state of Mato Grosso.

Otocinclus juruenea was discovered in 2016 and is currently only known from the Juruena river for which it is named. It is the first Otocinclus species to be found in the Tapajós river basin. It differs from all other members of the genus Otocinclus (except Otocinclus cocama) in having a complete lateral line. It also differs by having an iris operculum. The adult length of the species ranges from 2.2 to 3.3 cm (0.9 to 1.3 inches).
