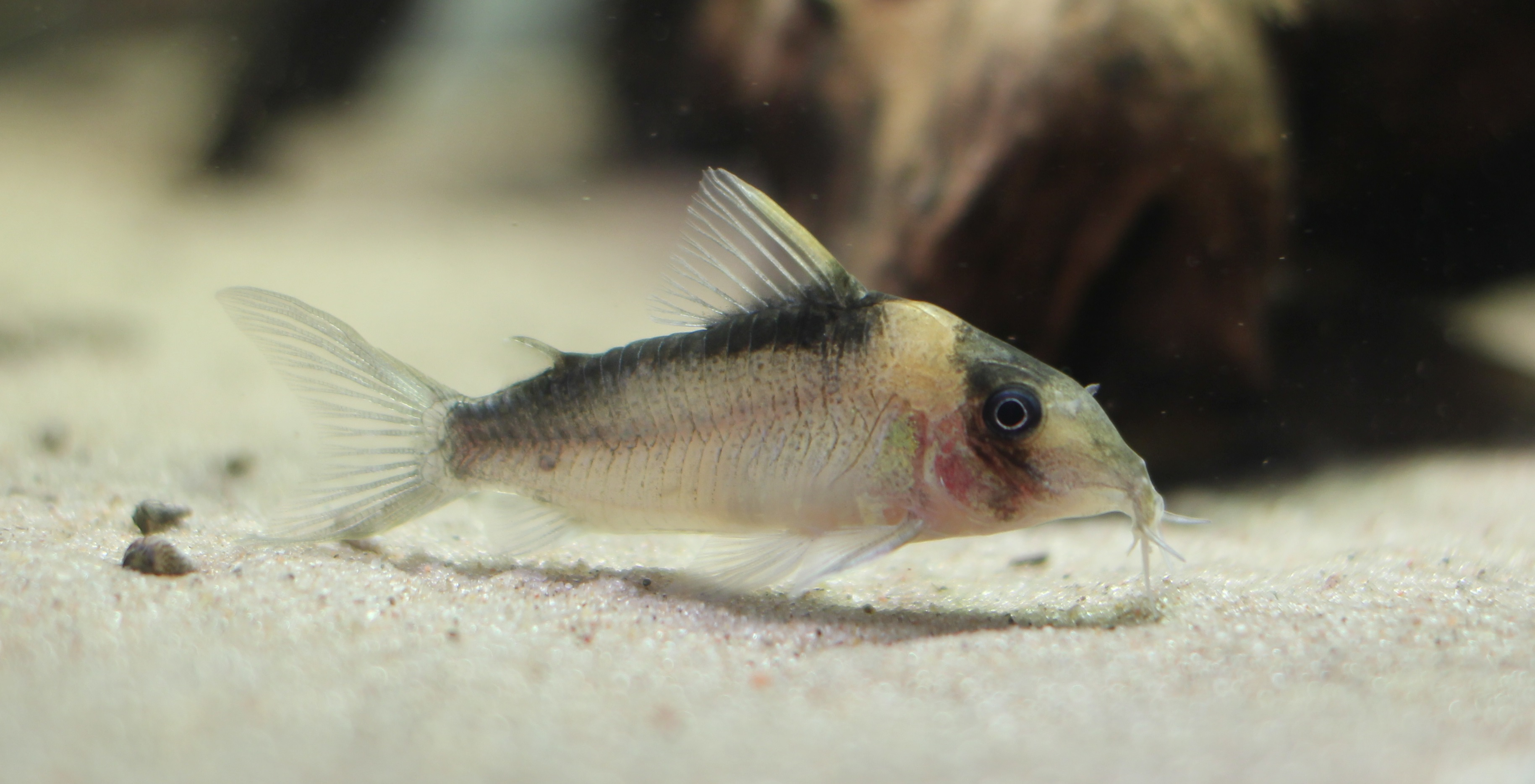

Conservation status
- Least Concern (IUCN 3.1)

Scientific classification
- Kingdom: Animalia
- Phylum: Chordata
- Class: Actinopterygii
- Order: Siluriformes
- Family: Callichthyidae
- Subfamily: Corydoradinae
- Genus: Brochis
- Species: B. imitator

Binomial name
- Brochis imitator (Nijssen & Isbrücker, 1983)

Synonyms
- Corydoras imitator Nijssen & Isbrücker, 1983

= Brochis imitator =

Species of armoured catfish

Brochis imitator, the imitator cory, is a species of freshwater ray-finned fish belonging the family Callichthyidae, the armored catfishes, and the subfamily Corydoradinae, the corys. This species is found in the Upper Amazon, Solimões, and Rio Negro basins in South America. It was first described by the Dutch ichthyologists Han Nijssen and Isaäc J. H. Isbrücker in 1983, and is frequently seen in the aquarium trade.

== Naming and etymology ==
Its specific name, imitator, means "mimic", a reference of this species' similarity to Hoplisoma adolfoi.

=== In other languages ===
In German, it is known as the Imitator-Panzerwels (English: imitator armored catfish).

In Mandarin Chinese, it is known as the 仿兵鯰 (Simplified Chinese: 仿兵鲇; pinyin: fǎng bīng nián; English: imitation soldier catfish).

== Morphology and physiology ==
=== Description ===
Brochis imitator is a small species of catfish, with adults typically growing to a length of 55 to 65 millimetres (2.2 to 2.6 in). It is sexually dimorphic, with sexually mature females tending to grow larger, broader, and deeper-bodied than males. As with all members of the genus Brochis, B. imitator is completely scaleless, and is instead covered with bony plates known as scutes.

=== Coloration ===
Brochis imitator is white in coloration, with an oblique dark band running across the dorsal surface of its body. It bears a similar coloration pattern to several other members of its subfamily that inhabit the Rio Negro region (hence its name), including Hoplisoma adolfoi, H. burgessi, H. davidsandsi, H. duplicareum, H. melini, and Corydoras serratus. These catfish oftentimes form large mixed schools amongst each other, and may even interbreed.

=== Venom ===
Like several other Corydoradinae species, such as H. adolfoi and H. panda, Brochis imitator secretes a mild venom from the axillary glands at the base of each pectoral-fin spine in order to protect itself from predators. When stiffened, these spines are capable of penetrating human skin and causing significant pain in conjunction with the venom.

== Distribution and habitat ==
Brochis imitator is native to the upper Rio Negro basin in South America in Amazonas, Brazil, northern Brazil, and Amazonas, Venezuela. It is found in a pH range of 6.0 to 8.0, in depths between 2 and 25 metres (6.6 and 82.0 ft), and in tropical temperatures of 25 to 27 °C (77 to 81 °F). It primarily inhabits blackwater rivers with low hardness, low conductivity, and relatively high acidity. It shares its habitat with small characids, pencil fishes, and dwarf cichlids from the genus Apistogramma. The type locality is Upper Rio Negro, eastern Amazonas, Brazil.

== Ecology ==
=== Behavior ===
Brochis imitator is a peaceful and gregarious fish, and well-suited to a community aquarium. Care should be taken not to house them with aggressive fish, as they may get harmed by B. imitator's venomous spines if they try to nip them.

An unusual behavior that Brochis imitator exhibits is occasionally rising to surface of the water and taking in gulps of air before submerging. This is not necessarily indicative of oxygen deprivation, but rather because B. imitator and other members of the Corydoradinae subfamily are facultative air-breathers, similar to Siamese fighting fish and tarpon. They possess a heavily modified intestine, which allows them to take in atmospheric oxygen and survive in low-oxygen environments.

=== Diet ===
Brochis imitator is a foraging omnivore, and primarily feeds on zoobenthos, such as small worms, crustaceans, and insects; as well as freshwater detritus and plant matter. In the aquarium, it will readily accept most sinking dry foods, as well as live or frozen brine shrimp, bloodworms, and Tubifex worms.

=== Reproduction ===
In the aquarium, Brochis imitator breeds similarly to other species of Corydoradinae, such as Osteogaster aenea. In order to facilitate breeding, a sex ratio of two males to one female is recommended. When females are visibly gravid, a large water change (50-70%) with cooler water should be performed daily until the eggs hatch, and oxygenation and flow should be increased. B. imitator eggs are often deposited on aquarium glass and among fine-leaved vegetation. It is recommended to place a spawning mop in the aquarium in order to facilitate the easy removal of eggs, as B. imitator will also readily deposit its eggs on them.

Once spawning is complete, all eggs should be moved to a separate tank in order to avoid predation. This tank should have the same water as the tank the eggs were spawned in, and should have similar levels of oxygenation as well. Incubation takes place for 3-4 days, after which the eggs will hatch. When the fry fully absorb their yolk sacs, it is recommended to feed them small live food such as brine shrimp and microworms.

== Relationship with humans ==
=== Conservation status ===
It has been evaluated by the IUCN Red List as Least Concern. It is frequently seen in the aquarium trade.

=== In the aquarium ===
Like other Corydoras species, B. imitator is a common sight within the aquarium trade. A minimum tank size of 90 x 30 cm is recommended, as they should ideally be kept in shoals of at least four to six individuals. The ideal water conditions are a temperature range of 20 to 27 °C (68 to 81 °F), a pH of 6.0 to 8.0, and a hardness of 18 to 90 ppm. The ideal substrate is fine sand, but rounded gravel is an acceptable alternative, provided that it is regularly cleaned. Cover, such as driftwood branches and dried leaf litter, should be provided to give B. imitator a sense of security.
