= Scleromystax reisi =

Scientific classification
- Kingdom: Animalia
- Phylum: Chordata
- Class: Actinopterygii
- Order: Siluriformes
- Family: Callichthyidae
- Genus: Scleromystax
- Species: S. reisi

Binomial name
- Scleromystax reisi M. R. Britto, Fukakusa & L. R. Malabarba, 2016

Species of fish

Scleromystax reisi is a species of catfish of the family Callichthyidae. Its distribution is in the streams of tributaries of the rio Jacuí and rio Camaquã of the laguna dos Patos drainage, of the Rio Grande do Sul in Brazil.

== Etymology ==
The fish is named in honor of Roberto E. Reis of the Pontificia Universidade Católica do Rio Grande do Sul, because of his many contributions to neotropical ichthyology, and the studies of callichthyid fishes.
