= Scleromystax prionotos =

Conservation status
- Least Concern (IUCN 3.1)

Scientific classification
- Kingdom: Animalia
- Phylum: Chordata
- Class: Actinopterygii
- Order: Siluriformes
- Family: Callichthyidae
- Genus: Scleromystax
- Species: S. prionotos

Binomial name
- Scleromystax prionotos (Nijssen & Isbrücker, 1980)

Synonyms
- Corydoras prionotos Nijssen & Isbrücker, 1980

Species of fish

Scleromystax prionotos is a tropical freshwater catfish belonging to the subfamily Corydoradinae of the family Callichthyidae. It originates in inland waters in South America, and is found in coastal rivers in southeastern Brazil from Espírito Santo to São Paulo. It was originally described by H. Nijssen & I. J. H. Isbrücker in 1980. The scientific name is occasionally misspelled C. prionotus.

The fish will grow in length up to 2.1 inches (5.3 centimeters). It lives in a tropical climate in water with a 6.0 – 8.0 pH, a water hardness of 2 – 25 dGH, and a temperature range of 72 – 78°F (22 – 26°C). It feeds on worms, benthic crustaceans, insects, and plant matter. It lays eggs in dense vegetation and adults do not guard the eggs.

== See also ==
- List of freshwater aquarium fish species
