= Corydoras fulleri =

Scientific classification
- Kingdom: Animalia
- Phylum: Chordata
- Class: Actinopterygii
- Order: Siluriformes
- Family: Callichthyidae
- Genus: Corydoras
- Species: C. fulleri

Binomial name
- Corydoras fulleri Tencatt, Evers & Britto, 2021

Species of fish

Corydoras fulleri, Fuller's cory, formerly called undescribed taxa C115 or C116, is a tropical freshwater fish belonging to the subfamily Corydoradinae, the corys, of the family Callichthyidae, the armoured catfishes. This species is lnown only from two tributaries of the río Manuripe and a tributary of the río Madre de Dios, rio Madeira basin, Peru. It lives in a tropical climate in water with a temperature range of 22–26 °C (72–79 °F).

Corydoras fulleri is distinctive owing to it having two pores within its supraorbital canal, three series of teeth on the upper tooth plate of the branchial arch, and, a small fleshy flap at the corner of the mouth, ventral to the maxillary barbel. It has a well developed and conical snout which frames a slightly concaved head shape from the tip of the snout to the anterior nares. Males will grow in length up to 7 centimetres (2.8 inches), while females will reach around 7.5 centimetres (3.0 inches).

It feeds on worms, benthic crustaceans, insects, and plant matter.

== Etymology ==
Corydoras fulleri is named in honour of Ian Fuller, an aquarist and owner of Corydoras World, a website and knowledge base dedicated to corydoradine catfish.

== See also ==
- List of freshwater aquarium fish species
