= Otocinclus hoppei =

Conservation status
- Least Concern (IUCN 3.1)

Scientific classification
- Kingdom: Animalia
- Phylum: Chordata
- Class: Actinopterygii
- Order: Siluriformes
- Family: Loricariidae
- Genus: Otocinclus
- Species: O. hoppei

Binomial name
- Otocinclus hoppei A. Miranda-Ribeiro, 1939

Species of catfish

Otocinclus hoppei is a species of freshwater ray-finned fish belonging to the family Loricariidae, the suckermouth armored catfishes, and the subfamily Hypoptopomatinae, the cascudinhos. This catfish is found in South America, where it is found in the Tocantins, Madeira and Paraguay river basins in the Brazil. The species reaches a standard length of 3.3 cm (1.3 in).

The specific name honors the honor of German civil engineer (specializing in hydroelectric power plants), writer and naturalist Werner Hoppe, the collector of the holotype.
