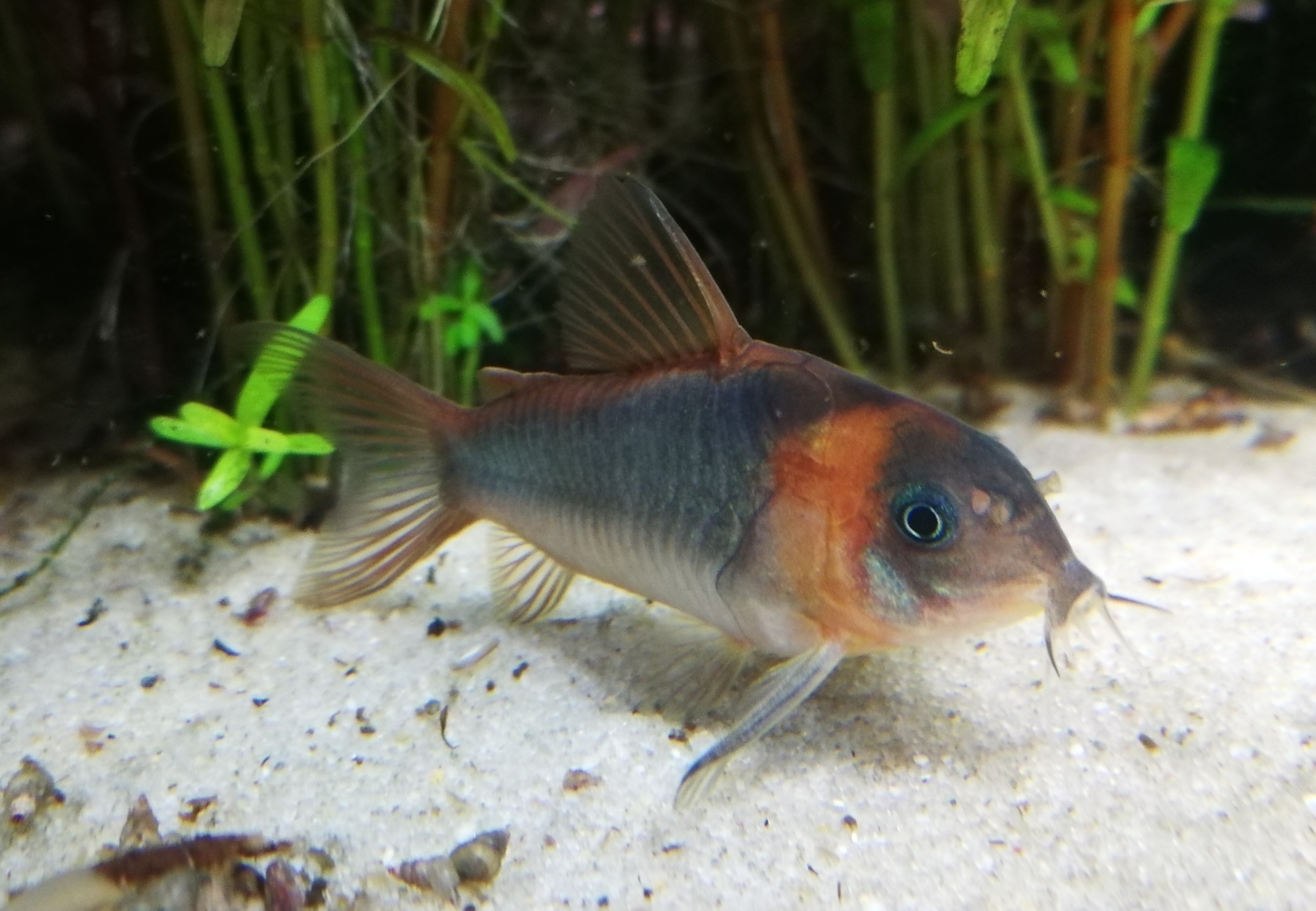

Conservation status
- Least Concern (IUCN 3.1)

Scientific classification
- Kingdom: Animalia
- Phylum: Chordata
- Class: Actinopterygii
- Order: Siluriformes
- Family: Callichthyidae
- Genus: Osteogaster
- Species: O. eques

Binomial name
- Osteogaster eques (Steindachner, 1876)

Synonyms
- Corydoras eques Steindachner, 1876

= Osteogaster eques =

Species of fish

Osteogaster eques, the horseman's cory catfish or true eques cory, is a tropical freshwater fish belonging to the subfamily Corydoradinae of the family Callichthyidae. It was first described by Austrian zoologist Franz Steindachner. It is native to the Brazilian Amazon basin. The name eques means "knight", "horseman" or "rider" in Latin.

== Life cycle ==
The male fertilizes the female's 2–4 eggs between her pelvic fins for around 30 seconds. Only then does the female swim to a suitable location and attach the very adhesive eggs. The couple continues doing this until around 100 eggs have been fertilized and connected.
