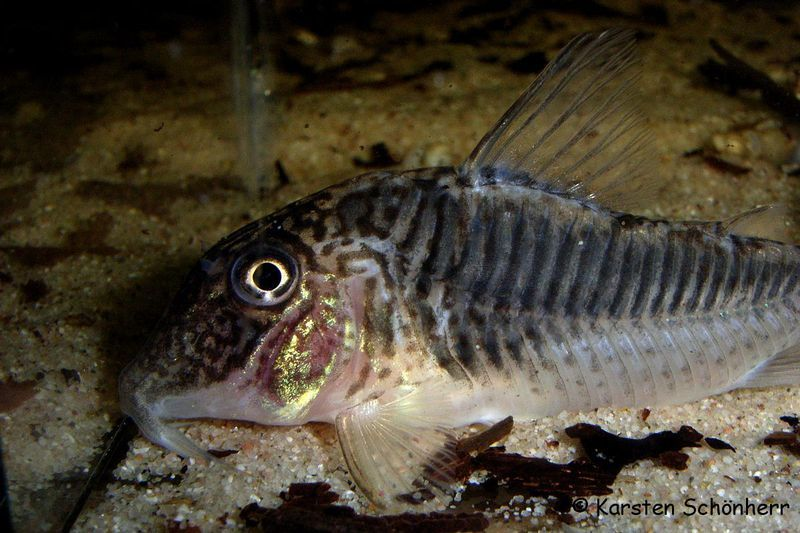

Conservation status
- Least Concern (IUCN 3.1)

Scientific classification
- Kingdom: Animalia
- Phylum: Chordata
- Class: Actinopterygii
- Order: Siluriformes
- Family: Callichthyidae
- Genus: Corydoras
- Species: C. geoffroy

Binomial name
- Corydoras geoffroy Lacépède, 1803

Synonyms
- Corydoras octocirrus Nijssen, 1970

= Corydoras geoffroy =

Species of fish

Corydoras geoffroy, the wolf cory, is a species of freshwater ray-finned fish belonging to the subfamily Corydoradinae, the corys, of the family Callichthyidae, the armoured catfishes. This species is found in the coastal rivers of French Guiana and Suriname.

It is the type species of the genus Corydoras.

The fish will grow in length up to 2.8 inches (7.1 centimeters). It lives in a tropical climate in water with a 6.0–8.0 pH, a water hardness of 2–25 dGH, and a temperature range of 22 to 26 °C (72 to 79 °F). It feeds on worms, benthic crustaceans, insects, and plant matter. It lays eggs in dense vegetation and adults do not guard the eggs.

== Etymology ==
The fish is named in honor of Lacépède's colleague Étienne Geoffroy Saint-Hilaire (1772–1844), for his observations of the various animals of Egypt, and in particular the fishes of the Nile.

== See also ==
- List of freshwater aquarium fish species
