= Sailfin corydoras =

Conservation status
- Endangered (IUCN 3.1)

Scientific classification
- Kingdom: Animalia
- Phylum: Chordata
- Class: Actinopterygii
- Order: Siluriformes
- Family: Callichthyidae
- Genus: Scleromystax
- Species: S. macropterus

Binomial name
- Scleromystax macropterus (Regan, 1913)

Synonyms
- Corydoras macropterus Regan, 1913; Corydoras bertoni Eigenmann, 1942

Species of fish

The sailfin corydoras (Scleromystax macropterus), bigfin corydoras, or largefin corydoras is a subtropical freshwater fish belonging to the Corydoradinae sub-family of the family Callichthyidae. It originates in coastal rivers in South America, and is found from São Paulo to Santa Catarina, Brazil and some upper Paraná River tributaries. It was originally described, under the name Corydoras macropterus, by Charles Tate Regan in 1913.

The fish will grow in length up to 3.4 inches (8.7 centimeters). It lives in a subtropical climate in water with a 6.0 – 8.0 pH, a water hardness of 2 – 25 dGH, and a temperature range of 64 – 70 °F (18 – 21 °C). It feeds on worms, benthic crustaceans, insects, and plant matter. It lays eggs in dense vegetation and adults do not guard the eggs.

The sailfin corydoras is of commercial importance in the aquarium trade industry.

== See also ==
- List of freshwater aquarium fish species
