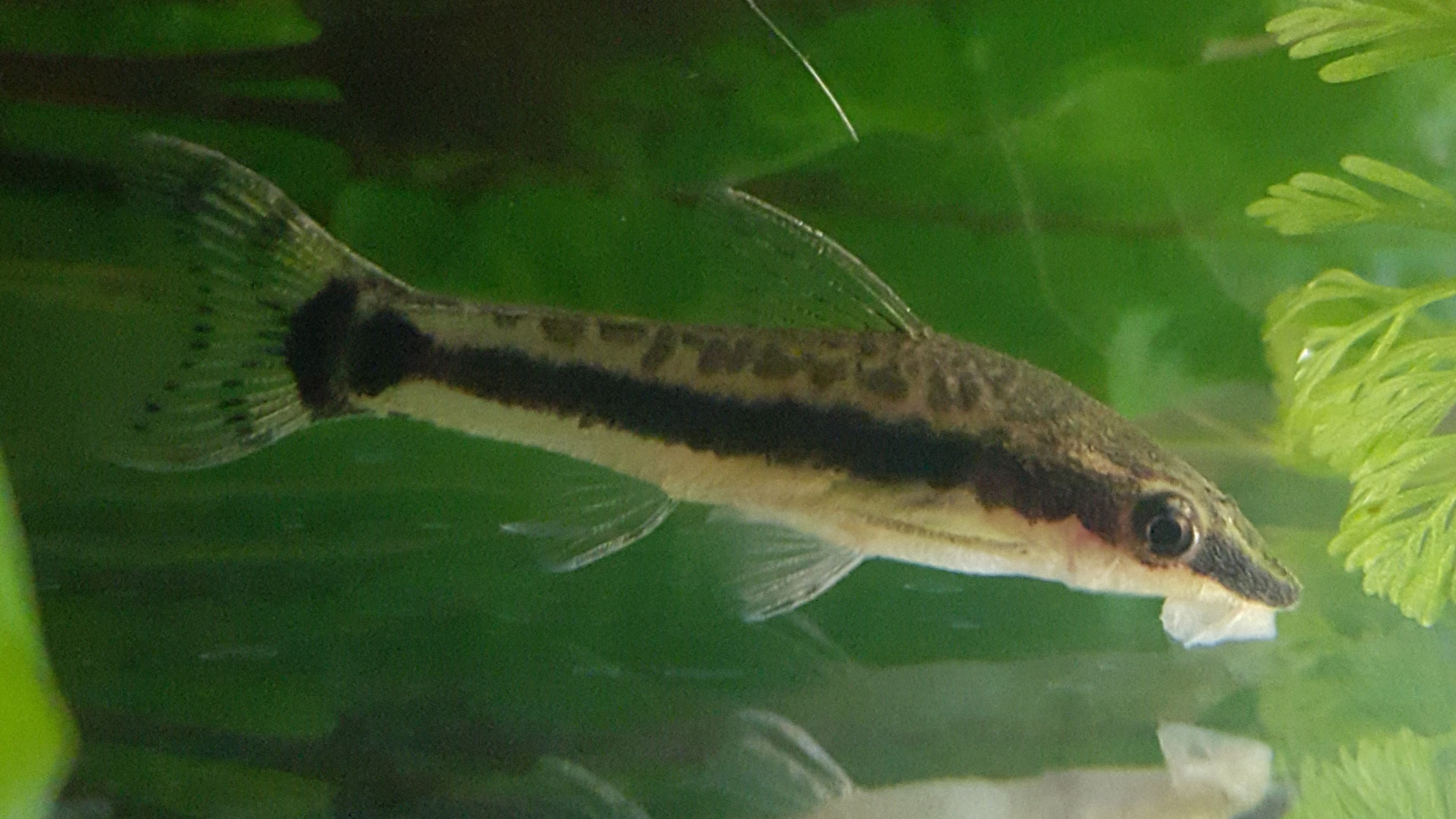

Conservation status
- Least Concern (IUCN 3.1)

Scientific classification
- Kingdom: Animalia
- Phylum: Chordata
- Class: Actinopterygii
- Division: Teleostei
- Order: Siluriformes
- Family: Loricariidae
- Genus: Otocinclus
- Species: O. vestitus

Binomial name
- Otocinclus vestitus Cope, 1872

= Otocinclus vestitus =

Species of catfish

Otocinclus vestitus is a species of freshwater ray-finned fish belonging to the family Loricariidae, the suckermouth armored catfishes, and the subfamily Hypoptopomatinae, the cascudinhos. This catfish is found in South America, where it has a wide distribution in the Amazon River basin and the Paraguay River, with records from the basins of the Orinoco and lower Paraná too. It has been recorded from Argentina, Bolivia, Brazil, Colombia, Paraguay, Peru and Venezuela. This species reaches a standard length of 3.4 cm (1.3 in). O. vestitus is found in the aquarium trade, where it is known as the dwarf otocinclus, a name also used for several other related species, some not classified in the genus Otocinclus.
