= Scleromystax salmacis =

Conservation status
- Least Concern (IUCN 3.1)

Scientific classification
- Kingdom: Animalia
- Phylum: Chordata
- Class: Actinopterygii
- Order: Siluriformes
- Family: Callichthyidae
- Genus: Scleromystax
- Species: S. salmacis

Binomial name
- Scleromystax salmacis Britto & R. E. dos Reis, 2005

Species of fish

Scleromystax salmacis is a species of catfish of the family Callichthyidae. S. salmacis has the southernmost distribution of its genus. It is known from the Mampituba River and Araranguá River basins in southern Santa Catarina State of Brazil, and the Ratones River, a small coastal river drainage in Florianópolis.
