= Otocinclus tapirape =

Conservation status
- Least Concern (IUCN 3.1)

Scientific classification
- Kingdom: Animalia
- Phylum: Chordata
- Class: Actinopterygii
- Order: Siluriformes
- Family: Loricariidae
- Genus: Otocinclus
- Species: O. tapirape

Binomial name
- Otocinclus tapirape Britto & Moreira, 2002

Species of catfish

Otocinclus tapirape is a species of freshwater ray-finned fish belonging to the family Loricariidae, the suckermouth armored catfishes, and the subfamily Hypoptopomatinae, the cascudinhos. This catfish is found in South America, where it is found in the Araguaia River the upper Tocantins River in the Brazilian states of Goiás, Mato Grosso and Tocantins. This fish reaches a standard length of 2.4 cm (0.94 in).
