= Otocinclus caxarari =

Conservation status
- Least Concern (IUCN 3.1)

Scientific classification
- Kingdom: Animalia
- Phylum: Chordata
- Class: Actinopterygii
- Order: Siluriformes
- Family: Loricariidae
- Genus: Otocinclus
- Species: O. caxarari

Binomial name
- Otocinclus caxarari Schaefer, 1997

Species of catfish

Otocinclus caxarari is a species of freshwater ray-finned fish belonging to the family Loricariidae, the suckermouth armored catfishes, and the subfamily Hypoptopomatinae, the cascudinhos. This catfish is found in South America, where it occurs in the Madeira, Purus, and Guaporé rivers in Brazil and Bolivia. This species reaches a maximum standard length of 2.6 cm (1.0 in).

Otocinclus caxarari has a specific name which refers to the Caxarari people. who lived in the basin of the Guaporé River in southwest Brazil.
