= Otocinclus huaorani =

Conservation status
- Least Concern (IUCN 3.1)

Scientific classification
- Kingdom: Animalia
- Phylum: Chordata
- Class: Actinopterygii
- Order: Siluriformes
- Family: Loricariidae
- Genus: Otocinclus
- Species: O. huaorani

Binomial name
- Otocinclus huaorani Schaefer, 1997

Species of fish

Otocinclus huaorani is a species of freshwater ray-finned fish belonging to the family Loricariidae, the suckermouth armored catfishes, and the subfamily Hypoptopomatinae, the cascudinhos. This catfish is found in Colombia, Ecuador and Peru.

Otocinclus huaorani can reach a maximum standard length of 3.2 cm (1.3 in).

The specific name, huaorani, refers to the Huaorani people of Ecuador who live in the upper Napo in Ecuador, this people have resisted encroachment and habitat destruction, mainly from oil exploration, in the Yasuní National Park by diplomatic and violent methods.

== Distribution and habitat ==
Otocinclus huaorani is found in the Amazon river basin in Colombia and Peru and the Orinoco river basin in Colombia. It is also found in Loreto, Peru and in the Napo river basin in Ecuador. The type locality for the species is a tributary of the San Miguel river in Napo, Ecuador It is found at altitudes of 100–400 m.

Otocinclus huaorani is found in rivers and streams that have lime and also oxbow lakes. It is a benthic fish.

== Status ==
Otocinclus huaorani is classified as least concern by the IUCN Red List due to its wide range. The species is threatened in some areas by water pollution from urban waste and agricultural runoff.
