= Otocinclus xakriaba =

Conservation status
- Least Concern (IUCN 3.1)

Scientific classification
- Kingdom: Animalia
- Phylum: Chordata
- Class: Actinopterygii
- Order: Siluriformes
- Family: Loricariidae
- Genus: Otocinclus
- Species: O. xakriaba

Binomial name
- Otocinclus xakriaba Schaefer, 1997

Species of fish

Otocinclus xakriaba is a species of freshwater ray-finned fish belonging to the family Loricariidae, the suckermouth armored catfishes, and the subfamily Hypoptopomatinae, the cascudinhos. This catfish is found in South America, where it is native to the São Francisco river basin in the Brazilian states of Bahia and Minas Gerais. This species reaches a maximum standard length of 3.1 cm (1.2 in).

O. xakriaba is a Batesian mimic that mimics juvenile Brochis garbei. The mechanism driving the mimicry is unknown.

The specific name of this fish refers to the Xakriabá, an indigenous people who used to live in the upper region of the São Francisco basin.
