= Otocinclus bororo =

Conservation status
- Least Concern (IUCN 3.1)

Scientific classification
- Kingdom: Animalia
- Phylum: Chordata
- Class: Actinopterygii
- Order: Siluriformes
- Family: Loricariidae
- Genus: Otocinclus
- Species: O. bororo

Binomial name
- Otocinclus bororo Schaefer, 1997

Species of fish

Otocinclus bororo is a species of freshwater ray-finned fish belonging to the family Loricariidae, the suckermouth armored catfishes, and the subfamily Hypoptopomatinae, the cascudinhos. This catfish is found in South America, where it occurs in the Paraguay River basin in the Brazilian states of Mato Grosso and Mato Grosso do Sul and in Paraguay. This species reaches a maximum standard length of 3.1 cm (1.2 in).

Otocinclus arnoldi has a specific name which refers to the Bororo, an indigenous people who used to live on the plains to the west of the Paraguay River between the Jauru and Guaporé Rivers in Western Brazil.

Otocinclus bororo is found in the aquarium trade, where it is sometimes called the Paraguay dwarf sucker.
