= Otocinclus batmani =

Conservation status
- Least Concern (IUCN 3.1)

Scientific classification
- Kingdom: Animalia
- Phylum: Chordata
- Class: Actinopterygii
- Order: Siluriformes
- Family: Loricariidae
- Genus: Otocinclus
- Species: O. batmani

Binomial name
- Otocinclus batmani Lehmann A., 2006

Species of fish

Otocinclus batmani is a species of freshwater ray-finned fish belonging to the family Loricariidae, the suckermouth armored catfishes, and the subfamily Hypoptopomatinae, the cascudinhos. This catfish is found in South America, where it occurs in the middle Amazon basin of Brazil, Colombia and Peru. This species reaches a maximum standard length of 3.7 cm (1.5 in).

Otocinclus batmani has a specific name which refers to the comic-book hero Batman, who had a bat shape for a symbol, this species has a pigmented "W" mark on its caudal fin, which resembles Batman's chest symbol.
