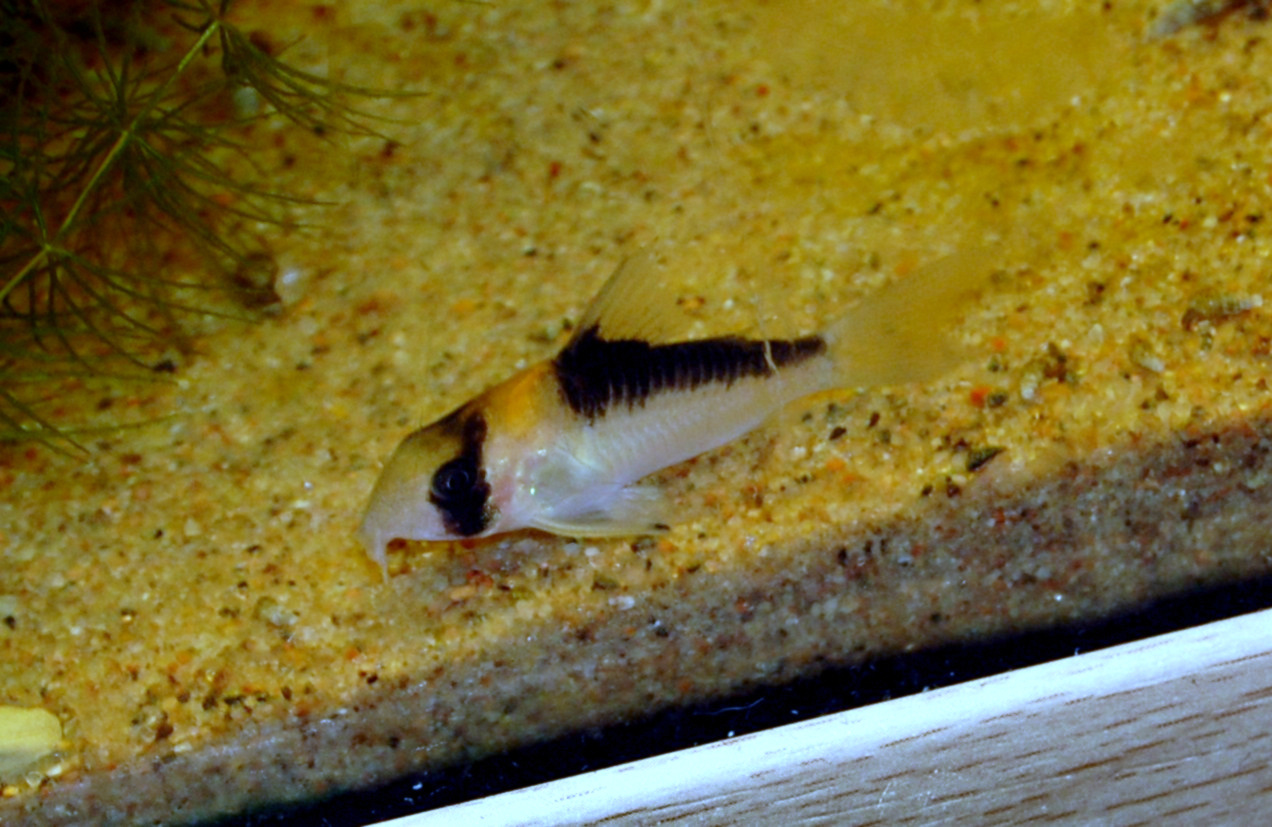

Conservation status
- Least Concern (IUCN 3.1)

Scientific classification
- Kingdom: Animalia
- Phylum: Chordata
- Class: Actinopterygii
- Order: Siluriformes
- Family: Callichthyidae
- Genus: Hoplisoma
- Species: H. adolfoi

Binomial name
- Hoplisoma adolfoi (Burgess, 1982)

Synonyms
- Corydoras adolfoi Burgess, 1982

= Adolfo's catfish =

Species of fish

Adolfo's catfish (Hoplisoma adolfoi) is a species of freshwater ray-finned fish belonging to the subfamily Corydoradinae, the corys, of the family Callichthyidae, the armoured catfishes. This species is found in the Rio Negro basin and the Rio Uapes in Brazil. It is also known as Adolfo's corydoras. It has similar color patterns to Brochis imitator but it has a shorter snout and red patch of color in front of its dorsal fin.

Adults of this species will grow in length up to 2.2 inches (56 mm). It feeds on worms, benthic crustaceans, insects, and plant matter.

The fish spawn in open water and 1–2 large (ca. 2 mm in diameter), sticky eggs are attached to a plant or stone. Adults do not guard the eggs. The number of eggs is relatively small (several tens per spawn from one female). At 26 °C the fry hatch after four days and start to eat after another four days.

== Etymology ==
Adolfo's catfish is named in honor of aquarium-fish collector and exporter Adolfo Schwartz in both its common name and specific name.

== See also ==
- List of freshwater aquarium fish species
