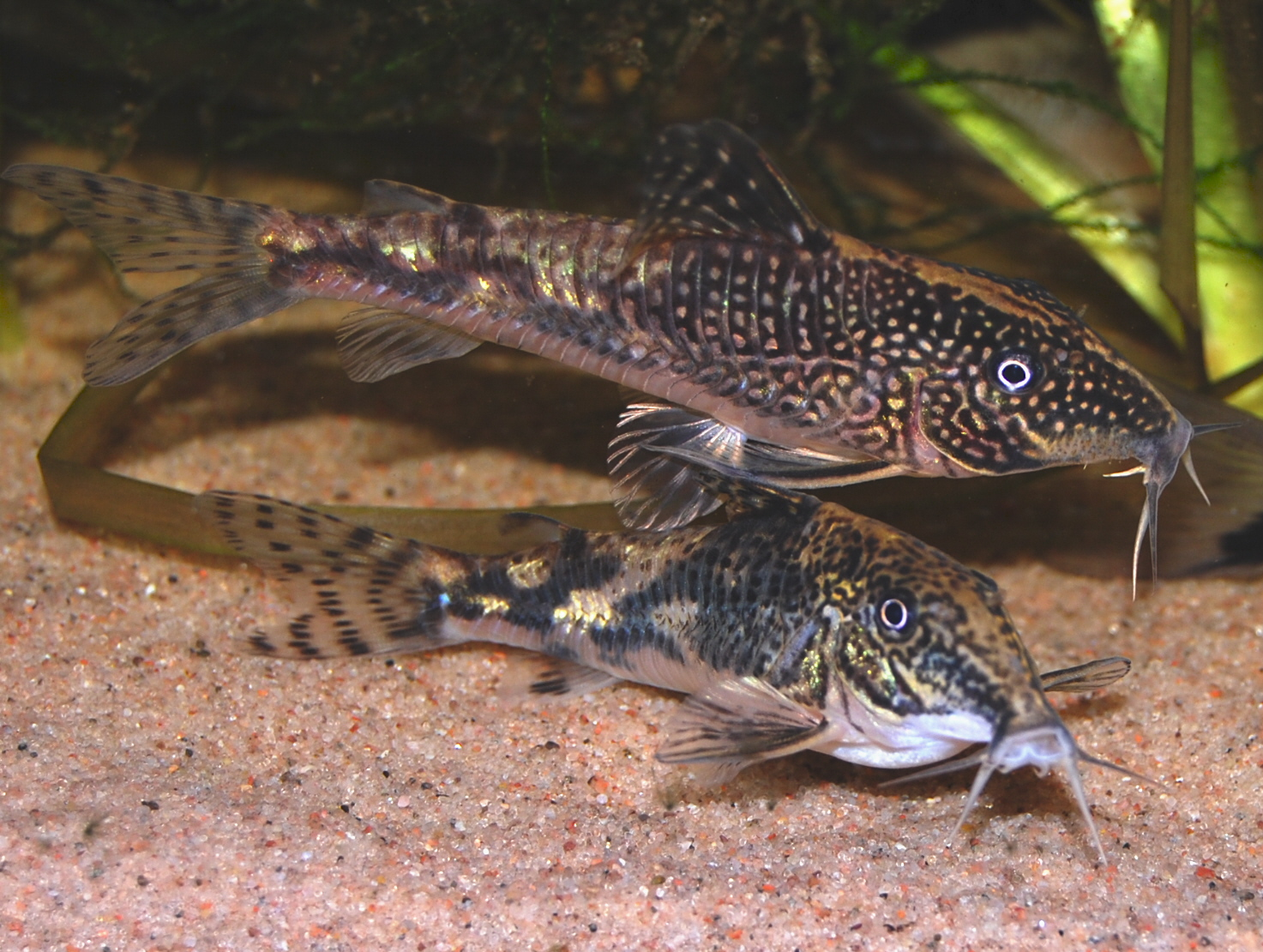
- Scleromystax barbatus

Scientific classification
- Kingdom: Animalia
- Phylum: Chordata
- Class: Actinopterygii
- Order: Siluriformes
- Family: Callichthyidae
- Subfamily: Corydoradinae
- Genus: Scleromystax; Günther, 1864

Type species
- Callichthys barbatus Quoy & Gaimard, 1824

= Scleromystax =

Genus of fishes

Scleromystax is a genus of fish in the family Callichthyidae endemic to small tributaries from several coastal river basins draining the southern and southeastern regions in Brazil. Most of the species of Scleromystax are highly sexually dimorphic; males have developed odontodes inserted in fleshy papillae on the preopercular-opercular region and the dorsal and pectoral fins are 2–3 times as long as those of females. S. salmacis is an exception, as its sexually dimorphic features are subtle and non-remarkable.

== Taxonomy ==
The species of Scleromystax were previously classified within the genus Corydoras. However, Scleromystax species are now thought to be more closely related to Aspidoras in a tribe called Aspidoradini. Although the monophyly of Scleromystax has been demonstrated, phylogenetic relationships of its species remains obscure. In addition, the taxonomic status of its species are only partially resolved.

== Species ==
There are currently 7 recognized species in this genus:

- Scleromystax barbatus (Quoy & Gaimard, 1824)
- Scleromystax lacerdai (Hieronimus, 1995)
- Scleromystax macropterus (Regan, 1913)
- Scleromystax prionotos (Nijssen & Isbrücker, 1980)
- Scleromystax reisi M. R. Britto, Fukakusa & L. R. Malabarba, 2016
- Scleromystax salmacis M. R. Britto & R. E. dos Reis, 2005
- Scleromystax virgulatus (Nijssen & Isbrücker, 1980)
