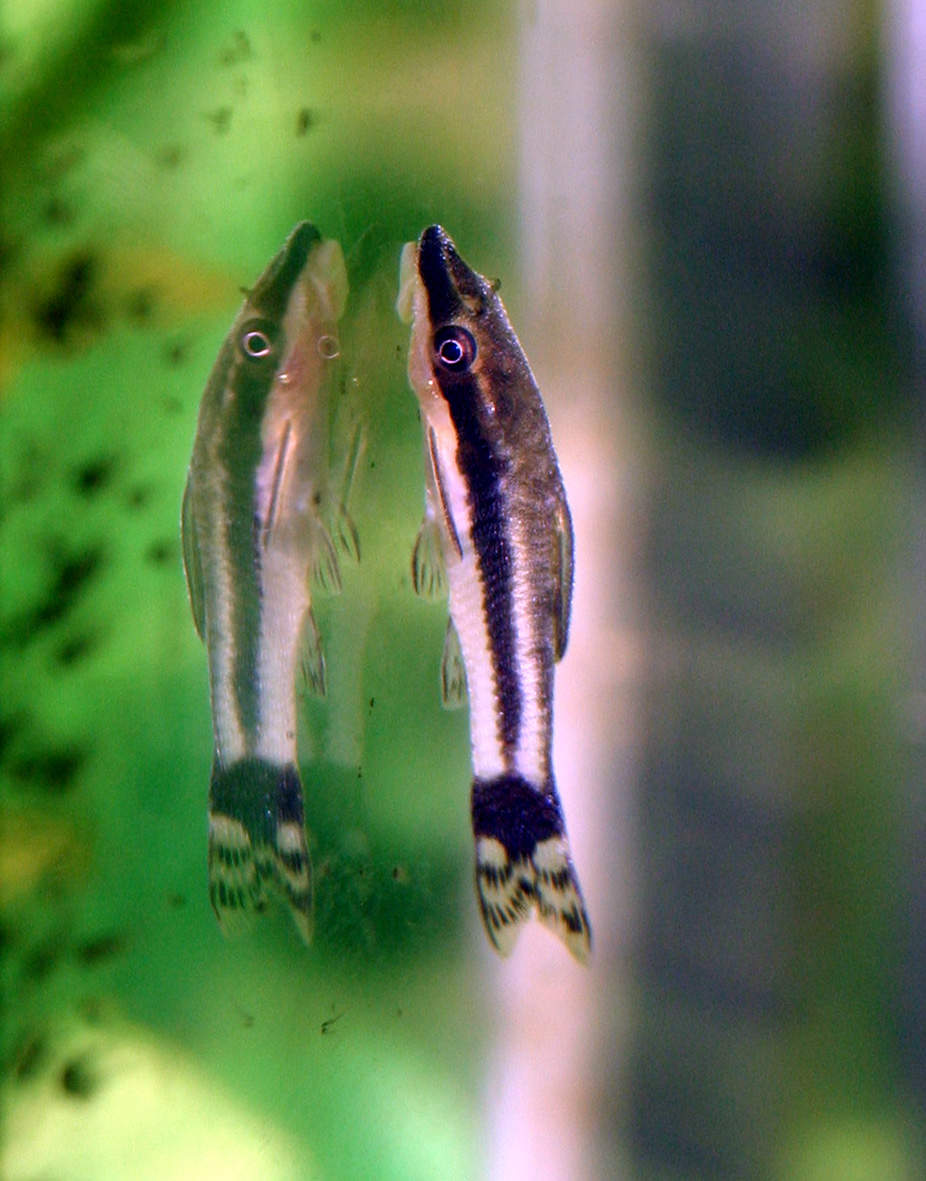

Conservation status
- Least Concern (IUCN 3.1)

Scientific classification
- Kingdom: Animalia
- Phylum: Chordata
- Class: Actinopterygii
- Order: Siluriformes
- Family: Loricariidae
- Genus: Otocinclus
- Species: O. affinis

Binomial name
- Otocinclus affinis Steindachner, 1877

Synonyms
- Macrotocinclus affinis (Steindachner, 1877)

= Otocinclus affinis =

Golden oto

Genus of fishes

Otocinclus affinis, the golden otocinclus, is a species of freshwater ray-finned fish belonging to the family Loricariidae, the suckermouth armored catfishes, and the subfamily Hypoptopomatinae, the cascudinhos. This catfish is endemic to southeastern Brazil, where it occurs in northern Rio de Janeiro state and the Ribeira de Iguape River in Sao Paulo state. The golden otocinclus is a herbivorous, rheophilic, bottom-feeder reachhes a standard length of 5 cm (2.0 in). The close relatives of this small fish are often used for the purpose of controlling algae in small home aquariums, under the name Otocinclus affinis. In reality, they belong to the species O. vittatus, O. vestitus and O. macrospilus and O. huaorani. The real O. affinis is rare in the aquarium hobby.

O. affinis is a Batesian mimic of Corydoras nattereri. Due to its narrow stripe, M. affinis resembles this Corydoras species more than it does Otocinclus species.

O. affinis prefers an aquarium with fast moving water, sandy substrate, and plenty of hiding areas (old broken clay pipes is a preferred hiding habitat). Preferred pH is slightly acidic with a tank temperature of 21–27 °C (70–81 °F). This particular species is not as hardy as many of the other Otocinclus species.

== See also ==
- List of freshwater aquarium fish species
