= Otocinclus flexilis =

Conservation status
- Least Concern (IUCN 3.1)

Scientific classification
- Kingdom: Animalia
- Phylum: Chordata
- Class: Actinopterygii
- Order: Siluriformes
- Family: Loricariidae
- Genus: Otocinclus
- Species: O. flexilis

Binomial name
- Otocinclus flexilis Cope, 1894

Synonyms
- Macrotocinclus flexilis (Cope, 1894); Otocinclus fimbriatus Cope, 1894

Species of catfish

Otocinclus flexilis, known in the aquarium trade as the peppered otocinclus, is a species of freshwater ray-finned fish belonging to the family Loricariidae, the suckermouth armored catfishes, and the subfamily Hypoptopomatinae, the cascudinhos. This catfish is found in South America, where it is known from the Lagoa dos Patos drainage basin in the Brazilian state of Rio Grande do Sul. The species reaches a total length of 6.8 cm (2.7 in).
