= Otocinclus mariae =

Conservation status
- Least Concern (IUCN 3.1)

Scientific classification
- Kingdom: Animalia
- Phylum: Chordata
- Class: Actinopterygii
- Order: Siluriformes
- Family: Loricariidae
- Genus: Otocinclus
- Species: O. mariae

Binomial name
- Otocinclus mariae Fowler, 1940

Species of fish

Otocinclus mariae is a species of freshwater ray-finned fish belonging to the family Loricariidae, the suckermouth armored catfishes, and the subfamily Hypoptopomatinae, the cascudinhos. This catfish is found in South America, where it occurs in the Amazon Basin, here it is known from the upper Madeira River and the lower Amazon River in Bolivia and Brazil. It may also be found in some coastal drainages in French Guiana and Suriname. Tis species reaches a standard length of 3.3 cm (1.3 in). The specific name ofthis fish honors Mary Pearsall Howes, who provided many fish specimens to the species describer, Henry Weed Fowler, from the Atlantic coast of the United States. Fowler also honored her husband and son in fish binomials.
