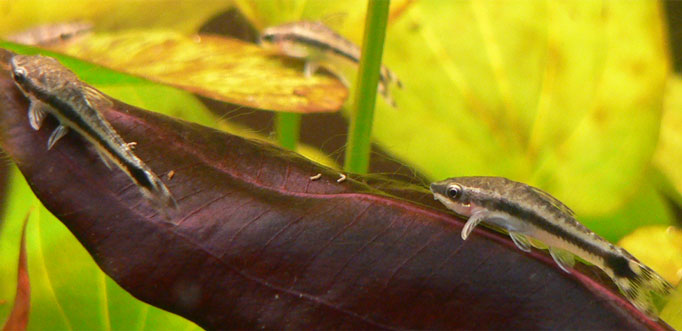

Conservation status
- Least Concern (IUCN 3.1)

Scientific classification
- Kingdom: Animalia
- Phylum: Chordata
- Class: Actinopterygii
- Order: Siluriformes
- Family: Loricariidae
- Genus: Otocinclus
- Species: O. vittatus

Binomial name
- Otocinclus vittatus Regan, 1904

= Otocinclus vittatus =

Catfish species

Otocinclus vittatus is a species of freshwater ray-finned fish belonging to the family Loricariidae, the suckermouth armored catfishes, and the subfamily Hypoptopomatinae, the cascudinhos. This catfish is found in South America, where it is known from the basins of the Amazon, Orinoco, Paraná-Paraguay, and Tocantins rivers. It has been recorded from Argentina, Brazil, Colombia, Peru, Bolivia, Venezuela, and Paraguay. This species reaches a total length of 3.3 cm (1.3 in). The species is found in the aquarium trade, where it is usually known as either the common otocinclus or the dwarf otocinclus, both of which are names that are used for other related species.

== In the aquarium ==
The common otocinclus is typically sold as an algae eater. It will rasp most kinds of algae from leaves, hard scape and glass. Unlike many fish sold under this label, this otocinclus is voracious and can starve if not given proper supplementary feedings after stripping an aquarium of all its preferred foods. This can be difficult, as they can be picky and may not take some foods.

The common otocinclus is a fragile fish, and it is almost always wild caught. Losses are not uncommon when adding a school to a tank. It should be kept in numbers, and will easily become stressed if kept without a sufficiently large school.
