= Otocinclus mura =

Conservation status
- Least Concern (IUCN 3.1)

Scientific classification
- Kingdom: Animalia
- Phylum: Chordata
- Class: Actinopterygii
- Order: Siluriformes
- Family: Loricariidae
- Genus: Otocinclus
- Species: O. mura

Binomial name
- Otocinclus mura Schaefer, 1997

Species of fish

Otocinclus mura is a species of freshwater ray-finned fish belonging to the family Loricariidae, the suckermouth armored catfishes, and the subfamily Hypoptopomatinae, the cascudinhos. This catfish is found in South America, where it is known only from the Amazon River basin in Brazil. It is a small loricariid, although it is not particularly small when compared with other Otocinclus species, reaching 3.6 cm (1.4 inches) SL. While it is known to appear in the aquarium trade, it does not have a widely used common name.
