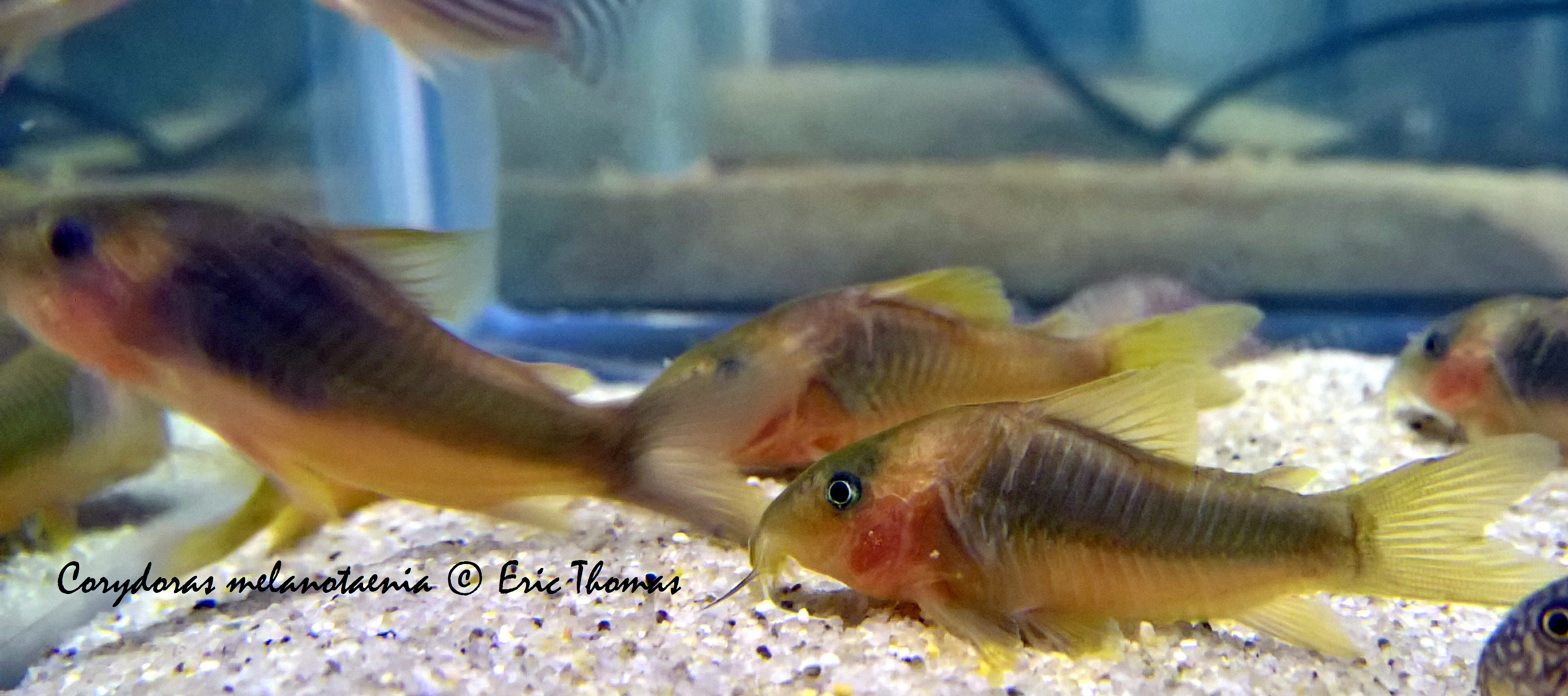

Conservation status
- Least Concern (IUCN 3.1)

Scientific classification
- Kingdom: Animalia
- Phylum: Chordata
- Class: Actinopterygii
- Order: Siluriformes
- Family: Callichthyidae
- Genus: Osteogaster
- Species: O. melanotaenia

Binomial name
- Osteogaster melanotaenia (Regan, 1912)

Synonyms
- Corydoras melanotaenia Regan, 1912

= Green gold catfish =

Species of fish

The green gold catfish (Osteogaster melanotaenia) is a species of freshwater ray-finned fish belonging to the subfamily Corydoradiane, the corys, of the family Callichthyidae, the armoured catfishes. This catfish is found in the Meta River basin in Colombia.

The fish grows up to 2.3 in (5.8 cm) long. It lives in a tropical climate in water with a 6.0–8.0 pH, a water hardness of 2–25 dGH, and a temperature range of 73–77 °F (23–25 °C). It feeds on worms, benthic crustaceans, insects, and plant matter. It lays eggs in dense vegetation, and adults do not guard the eggs. In captivity, the eggs are attached to the broad leaves of plants; the eggs hatch after five days. Usually, one spawning session produces about 150–180 eggs.

The green gold catfish is of commercial importance in the aquarium trade industry.

== See also ==
- List of freshwater aquarium fish species
