= Hoplisoma diphyes =

Conservation status
- Vulnerable (IUCN 3.1)

Scientific classification
- Kingdom: Animalia
- Phylum: Chordata
- Class: Actinopterygii
- Order: Siluriformes
- Family: Callichthyidae
- Genus: Hoplisoma
- Species: H. diphyes

Binomial name
- Hoplisoma diphyes (Axenrot & S. Kullander, 2003)

Synonyms
- Corydoras diphyes Axenrot & S. Kullnader, 2003

Species of fish

Hoplisoma diphyes, the variable cory, is a species of freshwater ray-finned fish belonging to the subfamily Corydoradinae, the corys, of the family Callichthyidae, the armoured catfishes. This catfish is endemic to Paraguay where it is restricted to tributaries of the río Monday and the río Acaray, both right bank tributaries of the río Paraná. This small catfish attains a maximum standard length of 4.5 cm (1.8 in).
