= Monday River =

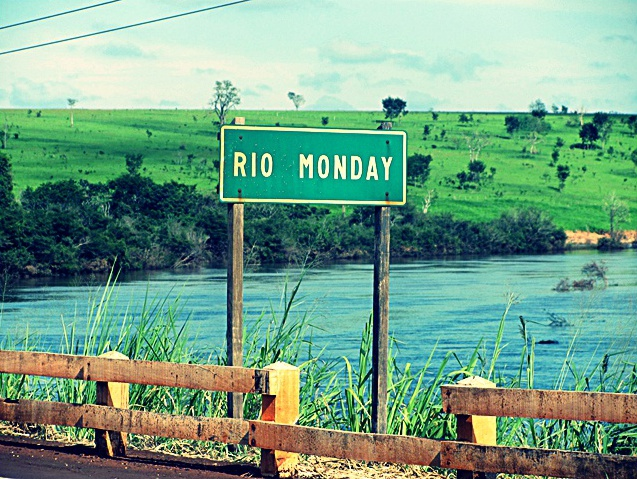

Location
- Country: Paraguay

Physical characteristics
- Mouth: Parana River
  - coordinates: 25°36′30″S 54°35′55″W

The Monday [mondaˈɨ] River is a river of Paraguay. It flows and empties into the Parana River, just south of the tri-border mark point of the Triple Frontier. Its primary course lies almost entirely within the Alto Parana Department.

Although the river's name is spelled the same as the English name of a day of the week, the river's name is pronounced "mon-da-ugh" and means "robbed river" in the indigenous Guarani language.

== See also ==
- List of rivers of Paraguay
