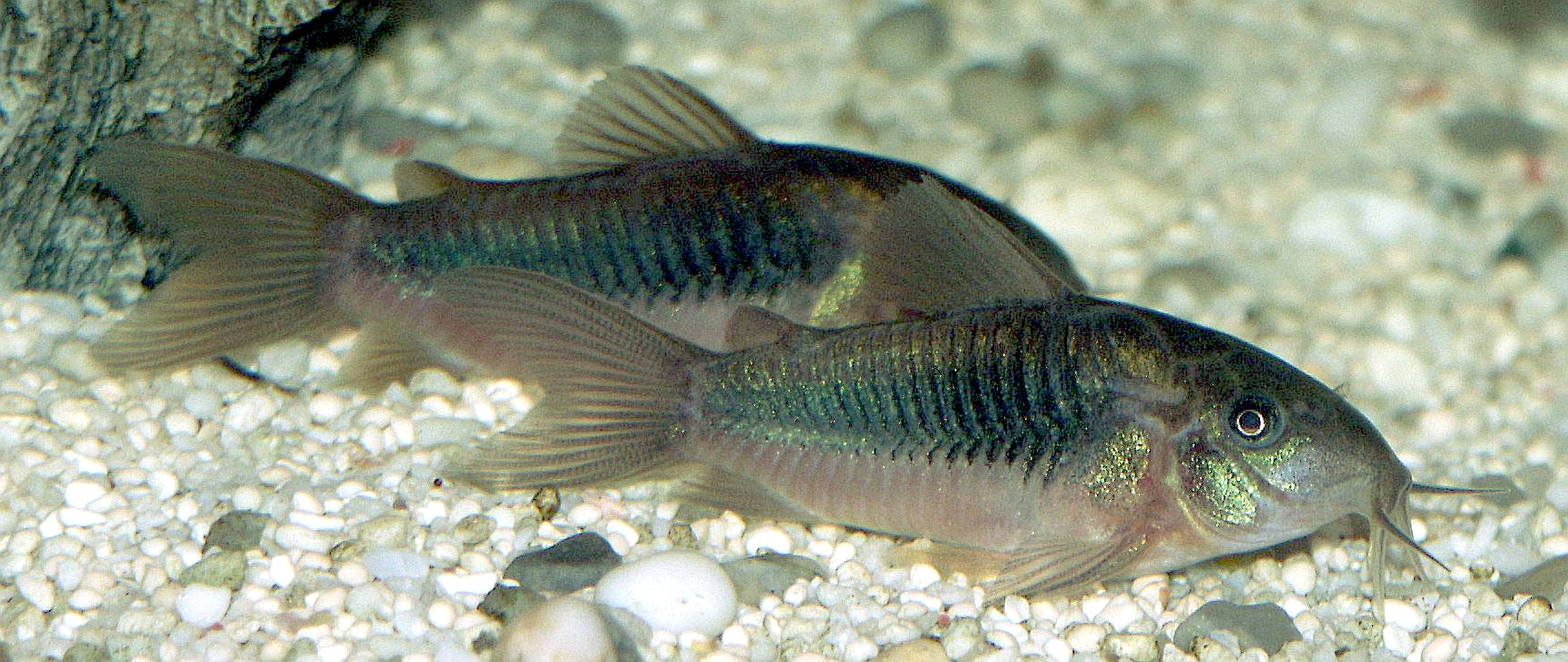

Conservation status
- Least Concern (IUCN 3.1)

Scientific classification
- Kingdom: Animalia
- Phylum: Chordata
- Class: Actinopterygii
- Order: Siluriformes
- Family: Callichthyidae
- Genus: Osteogaster
- Species: O. aenea

Binomial name
- Osteogaster aenea (Gill, 1858)

Synonyms
- Hoplosoma aeneum Gill, 1858; Corydoras aeneus (Gill, 1858); Corydoras venezuelanus Ihering, 1911; Osteogaster aeneus (Gill, 1858)

= Bronze corydoras =

Species of fish

The bronze corydoras (Osteogaster aenea), also known as the green corydoras, bronze catfish, lightspot corydoras or wavy catfish, is a species of freshwater fish in the armored catfish family, Callichthyidae, often kept as an aquarium fish. It is widely distributed in South America on the eastern side of the Andes, from Colombia and Trinidad to the Río de la Plata basin; however, as presently defined it is a species complex and a taxonomic review is necessary. It was originally described as Hoplosoma aeneum (based on a specimen from Trinidad) by Theodore Gill in 1858 and has historically also been referred to as Corydoras aeneus.

== Appearance and anatomy ==
The adult size is 6½ cm for males and a slightly larger 7 cm for females (2½ to 2¾ inches). Females have a slightly higher body frame than males in accordance with their larger abdominal region. Their average life span is 10 years. It has a yellow or pink body, white belly, and is blue-grey over its head and back. Its fins are yellow or pink and immaculate. In common with most Corydoradini the dorsal, pectoral and adipose fins have an additional sharp barb and have a mild poison which causes fish which try to attack them to get stung. A brownish-orange patch is usually present on the head, just before the dorsal fin, and is its most distinctive feature when viewed from above in the stream. Their upper sides are often a greenish color, which is the reason another common name for this fish is the green cory.

== Ecology ==
They are found in quiet, shallow waters with soft bottoms that can sometimes be heavily polluted by clouds of disturbed mud from the bottom, but it also inhabits running waters. In its native habitat, it inhabits waters with a temperature range of 25 to 28 °C (77 to 82 °F), pH 6.0–8.0, and hardness 5 to 19 DGH. Like most members of the genus Corydoras, these catfish have a unique method of coping with the low oxygen content that prevails in such environments. In addition to utilizing their gills like any other fish, they rapidly come to the surface of the water and draw air in through their mouth. This air is then absorbed through the wall of the intestine and any surplus air is expelled through the vent. It typically stays in schools of 20 to 30 individuals. It feeds on worms, benthic crustaceans, insects, and plant matter.

=== Reproduction ===
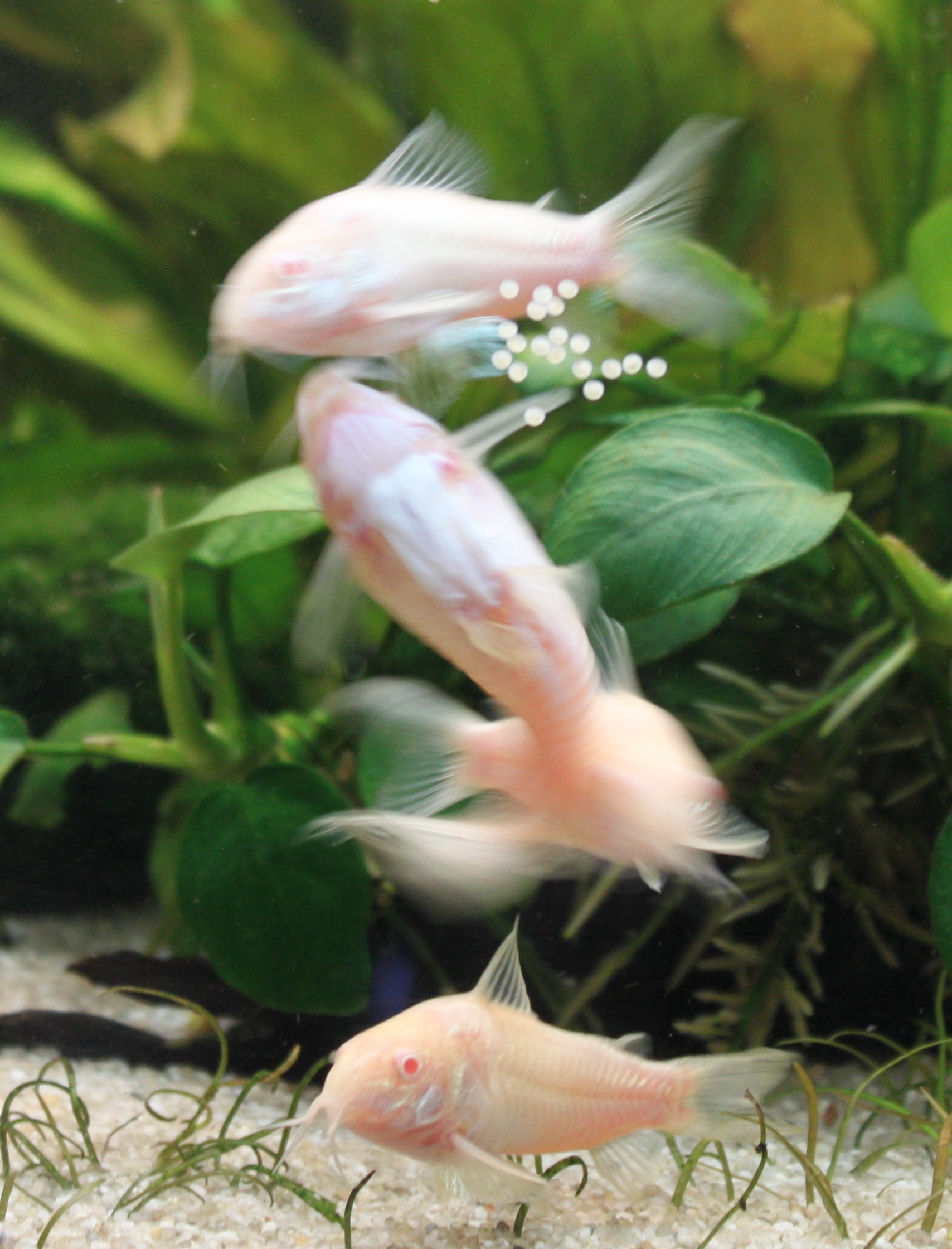
Albino Corydoras aeneus spawning

Reproduction occurs with the onset of the rainy season, which changes the water chemistry. Females spawn 10–20 egg-clutches with multiple males at a time, but an entire egg clutch is inseminated by the sperm of a single male.

In laboratory observations, it was found that bronze corydoras have a unique method of insemination. When these fish reproduce, the male will present his abdomen to the female. The female will attach her mouth to the male's genital opening, creating the well-known "T-position" many Corydoras exhibit during courtship. The female will then drink the sperm. The sperm rapidly moves through her intestines and is discharged together with her eggs into a pouch formed by her pelvic fins. The female can then swim away and deposit the pouch somewhere else alone. Because the T-position is exhibited in other species than just O. aenea, it is likely that they also exhibit this behavior. In the wild, eggs are laid on waterweeds.

Males do not form territories or compete over females; interference between males might only happen when two males present their abdomens simultaneously. On the other hand, females do not choose between males. Mating is more or less random; therefore, male reproductive success is directly related to courtship frequency.

The eggs of O. aenea exhibit a unique surface pattern with small villi-like protuberances which resemble attaching-filaments of teleost eggs. These structures allow the eggs to be adhesive and stick to a specific place or to each other. The presence of these structures may be related to the turbid habitat in which this species lives.

== In the aquarium ==
This section may not comply with WP:NOTHOWTO

Bronze corydoras are likely the most popular Corydoradini species. It is annually bred and shipped in large quantities all over the world. It is easily bred and is produced in commercial quantities in the United States, Europe, and Singapore. Most of the available fish are therefore captive-bred strains. Wild imports are reported to be less easy to breed.

They are a hardy and useful aquarium fish despite having a coloration that is by no means striking or unusual. Many aquarists are fascinated by the habits of these fish. They ceaselessly comb the bottom of the aquarium for food and therefore disturb it slightly, sending up detritus and waste material that has settled loosely on the bottom; and occasionally darting to the surface to get air. They prefer being kept in groups of 5 or more, being sociable fish and are ideal fish for a community tank. Other Corydoras species can be placed in the same aquarium, and despite the strong resemblance many species bear to one another, each one tends to school with only their own kind.

Osteogaster aenea is not particular about the composition of the water. Adequate conditions are a temperature range of 20 to 28 °C (68 to 82 °F), pH of 6.0–8.0, and hardness of 2–30 DGH. Bronze corydoras can tolerate a larger range of GH hardness compared to other species of corydora, if the overall water quality is clean. The water should have no salt added to it. A fairly dense growth of plants with a number of possible hiding places is greatly appreciated. Corys are easy to feed; they are omnivores and can eat a wide variety of flake and pelleted food, as well as many live and frozen foods.

When properly cared for, bronze corydoras are considered fairly easy to breed. After the breeding process, the female glues the eggs to her chosen surface, using her pelvic fins to deposit them. After several acts of spawning, which span a total of two to three hours, one female will have produced up to 200 eggs. Frequently, a female will spawn with two males, as one male cannot always sufficiently fertilize all the eggs. Once deposited, the eggs gradually grow darker in color over the course of around 3-7 days. When they are fully developed, they will turn dark brown and hatch. The newly hatched fry will generally keep to the bottom of the tank, feeding on detritus and any small food they find. The parents may spawn again within two to three weeks.

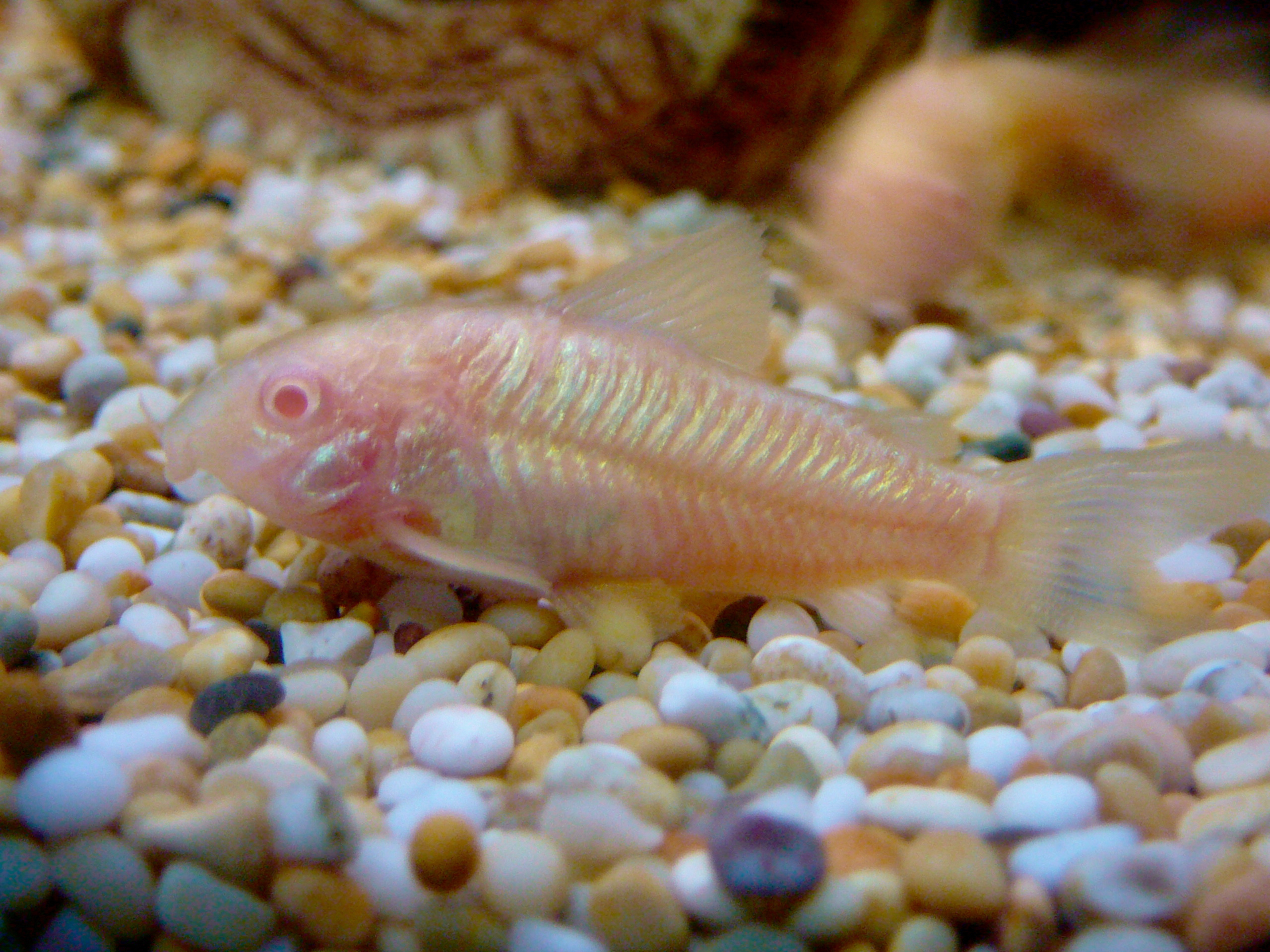
Albino corydoras

=== Albino corydoras ===
The albino corydoras is an albino variety of the bronze corydoras that has been developed for the aquarium trade, with a pale pink or orange body and red eyes. It is physically similar to normally-colored individuals, although some breeders report that the fry are a little slower to develop. Others say that the albinos are practically blind and that the males are somewhat sterile, although this may be due to extensive inbreeding. Albino bronze corydoras are frequently injected with bright dye (via a needle) and sold in aquariums. This controversial practice is known as "painting" or "juicing" fish.

== See also ==
- List of freshwater aquarium fish species
