= Brochis garbei =

Conservation status
- Least Concern (IUCN 3.1)

Scientific classification
- Kingdom: Animalia
- Phylum: Chordata
- Class: Actinopterygii
- Order: Siluriformes
- Family: Callichthyidae
- Genus: Brochis
- Species: B. garbei

Binomial name
- Brochis garbei (R. Ihering, 1911)

Synonyms
- Corydoras garbei R. Ihering, 1911

Species of fish

Brochis garbei, the Bahia catfish or coridora, freshwater ray-finned fish belonging to the subfamily Corydoradinae, the corys, of the family Callichthyidae, the armoured catfishes. It is endemic to Brazil, where it is found in the São Francisco River basin. It is sold as an aquarium fish. Its specific name, garbei, honours the German-born Brazilian zoologist Ernesto Garbe, who collected specimens, presumably including the holotype of B. garbei, for the Museu Paulista.
