= List of freshwater fish of Sri Lanka =

Sri Lanka is a tropical island situated close to the southern tip of India. It is situated in the middle of Indian Ocean. Because of being an island, Sri Lanka has many endemic freshwater fauna, including fish, crabs, molluscs, and other aquatic insects.

== Species List ==
Class: Actinopterygii

Freshwater fish are physiologically differ from marine and brackish water forms. The low salinity and high osmotic pressure makes them so different. Few fish can be found in all three ecological systems.

There are 95 species of freshwater fish occur in the country, where 53 of those are endemic. 41% of all known species of fish of Sri Lanka are found in freshwater. There are about 70% of endemism of those fish. Most of them are listed into IUCN categories. Four Devario species were described in 2017 by Batuwita et al. However, the taxonomy and descriptions were cited as problematic by fellow local ichthyologists.

Note: introduced species are not included in the list. Go to List of introduced fish in Sri Lanka.

== Freshwater eels ==
Order: Anguilliformes. Family: Anguillidae

There are 19 species and 6 subspecies in this family are all in genus Anguilla. Sri Lanka is home for 2 freshwater eels.

Name	Binomial	Status
Mottled Eel	Anguilla nebulosa	
Shortfin Eel	Anguilla bicolor	

== Carps and allies ==
Order: Cypriniformes. Family: Cyprinidae About over 320 genera, and more than 3,250 species are included in this family. 52 species found in Sri Lanka.

Common name	Binomial	Status
Attentive carplet	Amblypharyngodon melettinus	
Sinhala barb	Dawkinsia singhala	endemic
Blotched filamentous barb	Dawkinsia srilankensis	endemic
Giant danio	Devario aequipinnatus	
	Devario annnataliae	problematic taxon
Malabar danio	Devario malabaricus	
	Devario micronema	problematic taxon
	Devario monticola	problematic taxon
Barred danio	Devario pathirana	
	Devario udenii	problematic taxon
Indian flying barb	Esomus danrica	
Flying barb	Esomus thermoicos	
Ceylon Logsucker	Garra ceylonensis	endemic
Philipps' Garra	Garra phillipsi	endemic
Glow-light Carplet	Horadandia atukorali	
	Labeo heladiva	endemic
Green labeo	Labeo fisheri	endemic
Red fin labeo	Labeo lankae	endemic
Knuckles Laubuca	Laubuca insularis	endemic
Blue Laubuca	Laubuca lankensis	endemic
Ruhuna Laubuca	Laubuca ruhuna	endemic
Varuna Laubuca	Laubuca varuna	endemic
Scarlet banded barb	Puntius amphibius	
Red-side barb	Puntius bimaculatus	
Swamp barb	Puntius chola	
Long-snouted barb	Puntius dorsalis	
Kamalika's barb	Puntius kamalika	endemic
Kelum's barb	Puntius kelumi	endemic
Cherry barb	Puntius titteya	endemic
Greenstripe barb	Puntius vitattus	
Bandula barb	Pethia bandula	endemic
Two-spot barb	Pethia cumingii	endemic
Tic-tac-toe Barb	Pethia melanomaculata	endemic
Black ruby barb	Pethia nigrofasciata	endemic
Red-fined Barb	Pethia reval	endemic
Stoliczkae's barb	Pethia stoliczkana	
Ticto barb	Pethia ticto	
Amith's rasbora	Rasbora armitagei	endemic
Cauvery rasbora	Rasbora caverii	
Slender rasbora	Rasbora daniconius	endemic
Wilpita rasbora	Rasbora wilpita	endemic
	Rasboroides nigromarginatus	endemic
	Rasboroides pallidus	endemic
	Rasboroides rohani	endemic
Pearly Rasbora	Rasboroides vaterifloris	endemic
Asoka barb	Systomus asoka	endemic
Martenstyn's barb	Systomus martenstyni	endemic
Side-striped barb	Systomus pleurotaenia	endemic
Olive barb	Systomus sarana	
	Systomus spilurus	endemic
Timbiri Barb	Systomus timbiri	endemic
Deccan Mahseer	Tor khudree	

== River loaches ==
Family: Balitoridae

Common name	Binomial	Status
Banded Mountain Loach	Acanthocobitis urophthalma	endemic
Hill country Loach	Schistura madhavai	endemic
Spotback Loach	Schistura notostigma	native
	Schistura scripta	endemic

== True Loaches ==
Family: Cobitidae

Common name	Binomial	Status
Spotted loach	Lepidocephalichthys jonklaasi	endemic
Common spiny loach	Lepidocephalichthys thermalis	

== Naked catfishes ==
Order: Siluriformes. Family: Bagridae

Name	Binomial	Status
Dwarf catfish	Mystus ankutta	endemic
Gangetic mystus	Mystus cavasius	
Long Whiskers catfish	Mystus gulio	
Yellow catfish	Mystus keletius	
Striped dwarf catfish	Mystus vittatus	

== Sheat catfishes ==
Family: Siluridae

Name	Binomial	Status
	Ompok argestes	Endemic
Butter catfish	Ompok bimaculatus	
	Ompok ceylonensis	Endemic
Wallago	Wallago attu	

== Airbreathing catfishes ==
Family: Clariidae

Name	Binomial	Status
Walking catfish	Clarias brachysoma	endemic

== Airsac catfishes ==
Family: Heteropneustidae

Name	Binomial	Status
Asian stinging catfish	Heteropneustes fossilis	

== Swamp eels ==
Order: Synbranchiformes. Family: Synbranchidae

Name	Binomial	Status
Lesser swamp eel	Monopterus desilvai	
Bengal swamp eel	Ophisternon bengalense	

== Rivulines ==
Order: Cyprinodontiformes. Family: Aplocheilidae

Name	Binomial	Status
Ceylon killifish	Aplocheilus dayi	endemic
Dwarf panchax	Aplocheilus parvus	
Werners killifish	Aplocheilus werneri	endemic

== Ricefish ==
Family: Adrianichthyidae

Name	Binomial	Status
Spotted ricefish	Oryzias carnaticus	
Indian ricefish	Oryzias dancena	

== Cichlids ==
Order: Perciformes. Family: Cichlidae

Name	Binomial	Status
Orange chromide	Etroplus maculatus	
Green chromide	Etroplus suratensis	

== Climbing perches ==
Family: Anabantidae

Name	Binomial	Status
Climbing perch	Anabas testudineus	

== Gourami ==
Family: Osphronemidae

Name	Binomial	Status
Ceylonese combtail	Belontia signata	endemic
Ornate parasidefish	Malpulutta kretseri	endemic
Spike-tailed paradisefish	Pseudosphromenus cupanus	

== Snakeheads ==
Family: Channidae

Name	Binomial	Status
Giant snakehead	Channa marulius	
Dwarf snakehead	Channa gachua	
Ceylon snakehead	Channa orientalis	endemic
Spotted snakehead	Channa punctata	
Striped snakehead	Channa striata	
	Channa kelaartii	

== Garfishes ==
Family: Belonidae

Name	Binomial	Status
Freshwater garfish	Xenentodon cancila	

== Sleeper gobies ==
Family: Eleotridae

Name	Binomial	Status
Crazyfish	Butis butis	
Dusky sleeper	Eleotris fusca	

== Spiny eels ==
Family: Mastacembelidae

Name	Binomial	Status
Tire track eel	Mastacembelus armatus	
Sri Lanka spiny eel	Macrognathus pentophthalmos	

== Gobies ==
Family: Gobiidae

Name	Binomial	Status
Large snout goby	Awaous melanocephalus	
Tank goby	Glossogobius giuris	
Sharptail goby	Oligolepis acutipennis	
Red neck goby	Schismatogobius deraniyagalai	
Stone goby	Sicyopterus griseus	
Redtail goby	Sicyopterus lagocephalus	
Lipstick goby	Sicyopus jonklaasi	endemic
Martenstyn's goby	Stiphodon martenstyni	endemic
