= Giant's Tank Sanctuary =

Protected area in Sri Lanka

- கட்டுக்கரை குளம் சரணாலயம்
- IUCN category IV (habitat/species management area)
- Location within Northern Province
- Location: Northern Province
- Nearest city: Mannar
- Coordinates: 08°51′30″N 80°03′45″E
- Area: 43 km^{2} (17 sq mi)
- Established: 24 September 1954
- Owner: Government of Sri Lanka
- Administrator: Department of Wildlife Conservation

Giant's Tank Sanctuary (Tamil: கட்டுக்கரை குளம் சரணாலயம் Kaṭṭukkarai Kuḷam Caraṇālayam) is a wildlife sanctuary in northern Sri Lanka, approximately 20 km (12 mi) south east of Mannar.

== History ==
Giant's Tank and its surrounding area was designated as a sanctuary on 24 September 1954 under the Fauna and Flora Protection Ordinance (No. 2) of 1937. It had an area of 3,941 ha (9,738 acres) in 1990. It currently has an area of 4,330 ha (10,700 acres).

Giant's Tank Sanctuary has been subject to illegal deforestation to make way for banana plantation for the Dole Food Company.

== Flora and fauna ==
Giant's Tank is surrounded by rice paddies and dry scrub forest. Numerous varieties of water and wader birds are found in the sanctuary including the Eurasian wigeon, garganey, knob-billed duck and pygmy goose. Fish found in the tank include channa striata, heteropneustes fossilis, labeo dussumieri, Mozambique tilapia, olive barb, ompok bimaculatus and long-snouted barb. Asian elephants are also found in the sanctuary.
