= Laubuka trevori =

Conservation status
- Vulnerable (IUCN 3.1)

Scientific classification
- Kingdom: Animalia
- Phylum: Chordata
- Class: Actinopterygii
- Order: Cypriniformes
- Family: Danionidae
- Subfamily: Danioninae
- Genus: Laubuka
- Species: L. trevori

Binomial name
- Laubuka trevori Knight, 2015

Species of fish

Laubuka trevori is a species of freshwater ray-finned fish belonging to family Danionidae. It was described in 2015 from specimens collected in the Cauvery River and its tributaries in the Western Ghats of India. This species and Laubuka latens had been thought to be local variants of the Indian glass barb (L. laubuca) but were shown to be different species. The unique features of L. latens are that it has 7½ branched rays in its dorsal fin with 5 branched rays in its pelvic fin; it has 14 precaudal vertebrae and 17–18 predorsal scales; as well as 5+4+2 teeth on the fifth ceratobranchial bone. L. trevori has 14½–15½ branched rays in its anal fin, a relatively short pelvic fin which is about a fifth as long as its standard length and it has two stripes running along its body: one a golden and the other a blue-green stripe which runs from behind the operculum to the peduncle of the caudal fin which is broken and less distinct towards the head than the golden stripe.
