= Laubuka latens =

Conservation status
- Endangered (IUCN 3.1)

Scientific classification
- Kingdom: Animalia
- Phylum: Chordata
- Class: Actinopterygii
- Order: Cypriniformes
- Family: Danionidae
- Subfamily: Danioninae
- Genus: Laubuka
- Species: L. latens

Binomial name
- Laubuka latens Knight, 2015

Species of fish

Laubuka latens is a species of freshwater ray-finned fish belonging to family Danionidae. It was described in 2015 from specimens collected in the Cauvery River and its tributaries in the Western Ghats of India. This species and Laubuka trevori had been thought to be local variants of the Indian glass barb (L. laubuca) but were shown to be different species. The unique features of L. latens are that it has 7½ branched rays in its dorsal fin with 5 branched rays in its pelvic fin; it has 14 precaudal vertebrae and 17–18 predorsal scales; aw s well as 5+4+2 teeth on the fifth ceratobranchial bone. It can also be distinguished from its close relatives by its plain unmarked body, lacking stripes.
