= Giant's Tank =

- கட்டுக்கரை குளம் (Tamil); යෝධ වැව (Sinhala)
- Location within Northern Province
- Location: Northern Province
- Coordinates: 08°52′32″N 80°02′00″E
- Type: Artificial lake
- River sources: Aruvi Aru
- Catchment area: 38 sq mi (98 km^{2})
- Managing agency: Department of Irrigation, Government of Sri Lanka
- Water volume: 31,500 acre⋅ft (38,854,678 m^{3})
- Surface elevation: 44 ft (13 m)

Giant's Tank (Tamil: கட்டுக்கரை குளம், romanized: Kaṭṭukkarai Kuḷam; Sinhala: යෝධ වැව Yōdha Væva) is an irrigation tank in northern Sri Lanka, approximately 10 mi (16 km) south east of Mannar.

== History ==
Some historians have speculated that Giant's Tank is the same as the Mahanama Matha Vapi tank built by King Dhatusena in the fifth century and restored by King Parakramabahu I in the twelfth century. On the other hand, Mudaliyar C. Rajanayagam in his book Ancient Jaffna suggests that the tank was probably constructed by the Nagas. Rajanayagam has suggested that the Megisba lake mentioned by Pliny in Description of Taprobane was in fact Giant's Tank.

Consideration was given to renovating the tank during Dutch Governor Willem Jacob van de Graaf's administration in the eighteenth century but nothing happened. Restoration did however begin in the 1880s following a motion in the Legislative Council by P. Ramanathan. Delays by epidemics and other issues meant that restoration wasn't completed until November 1902. A 90 ft (27 m) thick, 12 ft (4 m) high, 640 ft (195 m) long stone dam (known as tekkam in Tamil) was built across the Aruvi Aru 22 mi (35 km) from its mouth. The waters were then diverted to Giant's Tank by a 12 mi (19 km) inlet channel (alawakkai). The tank had a catchment area of 38 sq mi (98 km^{2}). The name Giant's Tank was the English translation of the local name for the tank - Sodayan Kattu Karai (giant built embankment). The tank is now known as Kattukarai Kulam in Tamil.

Responsibility for the tank passed from the Public Works Department to the Department of Irrigation in 1900. By the late 1960s the tank's bund was 4.5 mi (7 km) long and 10 ft 4 in (3 m) high whilst the tank's storage capacity was 26,600 acre⋅ft (32,810,617 m^{3}) and its water spread area was 4,550 acres (1,841 ha). There was a 172 ft (52 m) channel flow spill on the right bank and seven sluices. Water from the tank was transferred to numerous minor irrigation tanks via a 24 mi (39 km) main channel and 24 mi (39 km) of branch channels.

The tank's storage capacity was 30,500 acre⋅ft (37,621,196 m^{3}) in 2003 and it was capable of irrigating 24,000 acres (9,712 ha). The tank's height was 11.5 ft (4 m) but it was capable of holding 10 ft (3 m) safely. The tank's storage capacity was 31,500 acre⋅ft (38,854,678 m^{3}) in 2009 and it was capable of irrigating 27,000 acres (10,927 ha).

== See also ==
- Giant's Tank Sanctuary
