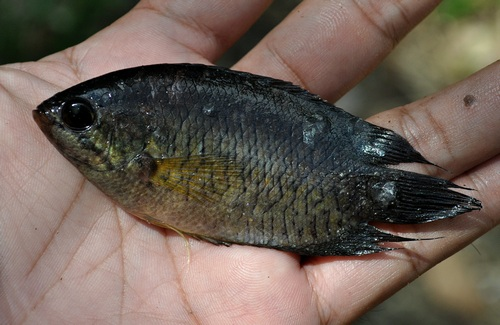
- Malay combtail (B. hasselti)

Scientific classification
- Kingdom: Animalia
- Phylum: Chordata
- Class: Actinopterygii
- Order: Anabantiformes
- Family: Osphronemidae
- Subfamily: Belontiinae; Liem, 1963
- Genus: Belontia; G. S. Myers, 1923

Type species
- Polyacanthus hasselti G. Cuvier, 1831
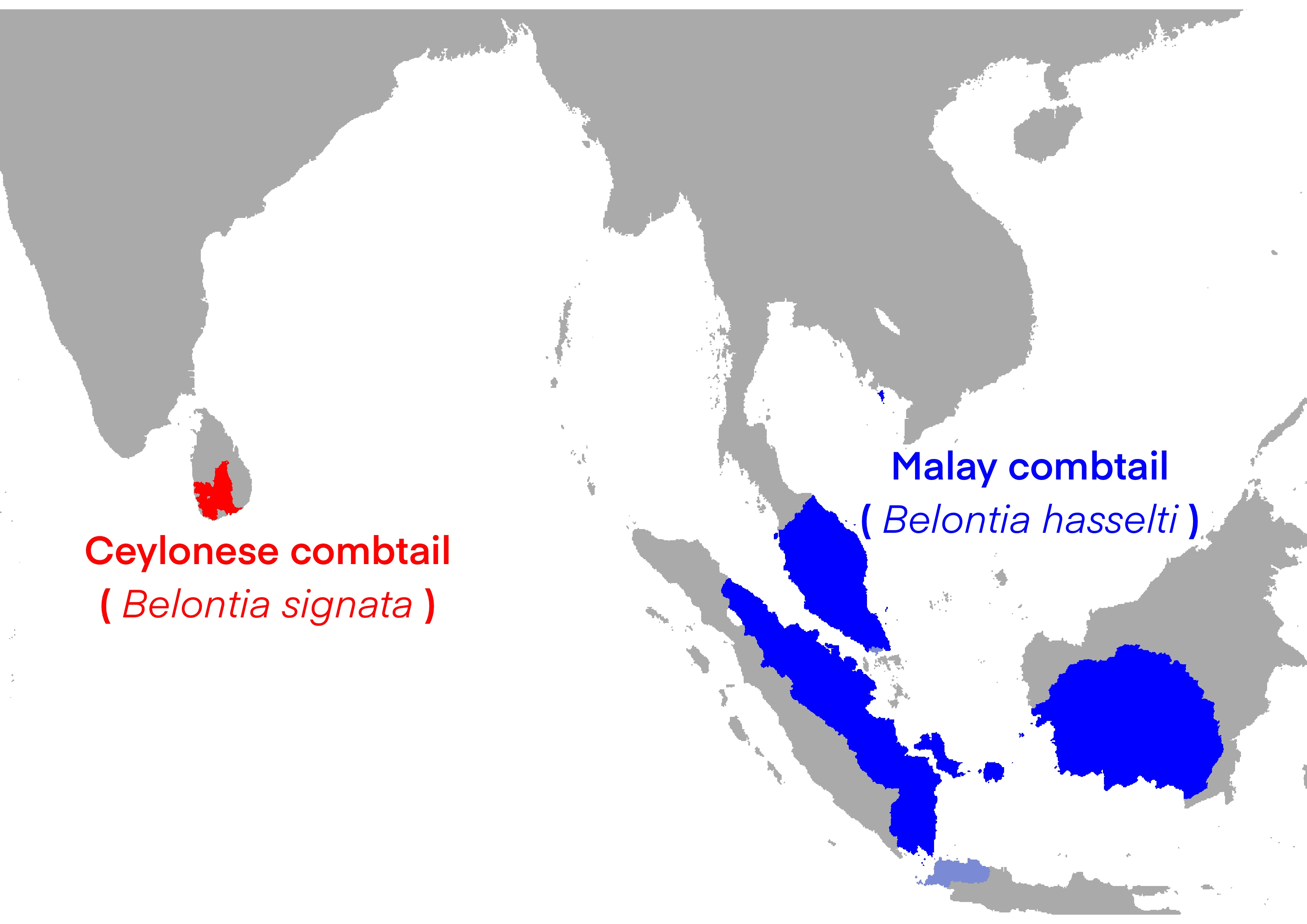

= Belontia =

Genus of fishes

Belontia, sometimes referred to as combtail gouramis, is a genus of gouramis, the only genus within the subfamily Belontiinae, native to freshwater habitats in Southeast Asia and Sri Lanka. These are medium sized to large gouramis that are rarely kept in aquariums due to their aggression and relative lack of the color common to other gouramis.

== Species ==
There are currently two recognized species in this genus:

- Belontia hasselti (G. Cuvier, 1831) (Malay combtail)
- Belontia signata (Günther, 1861) (Ceylonese combtail)
