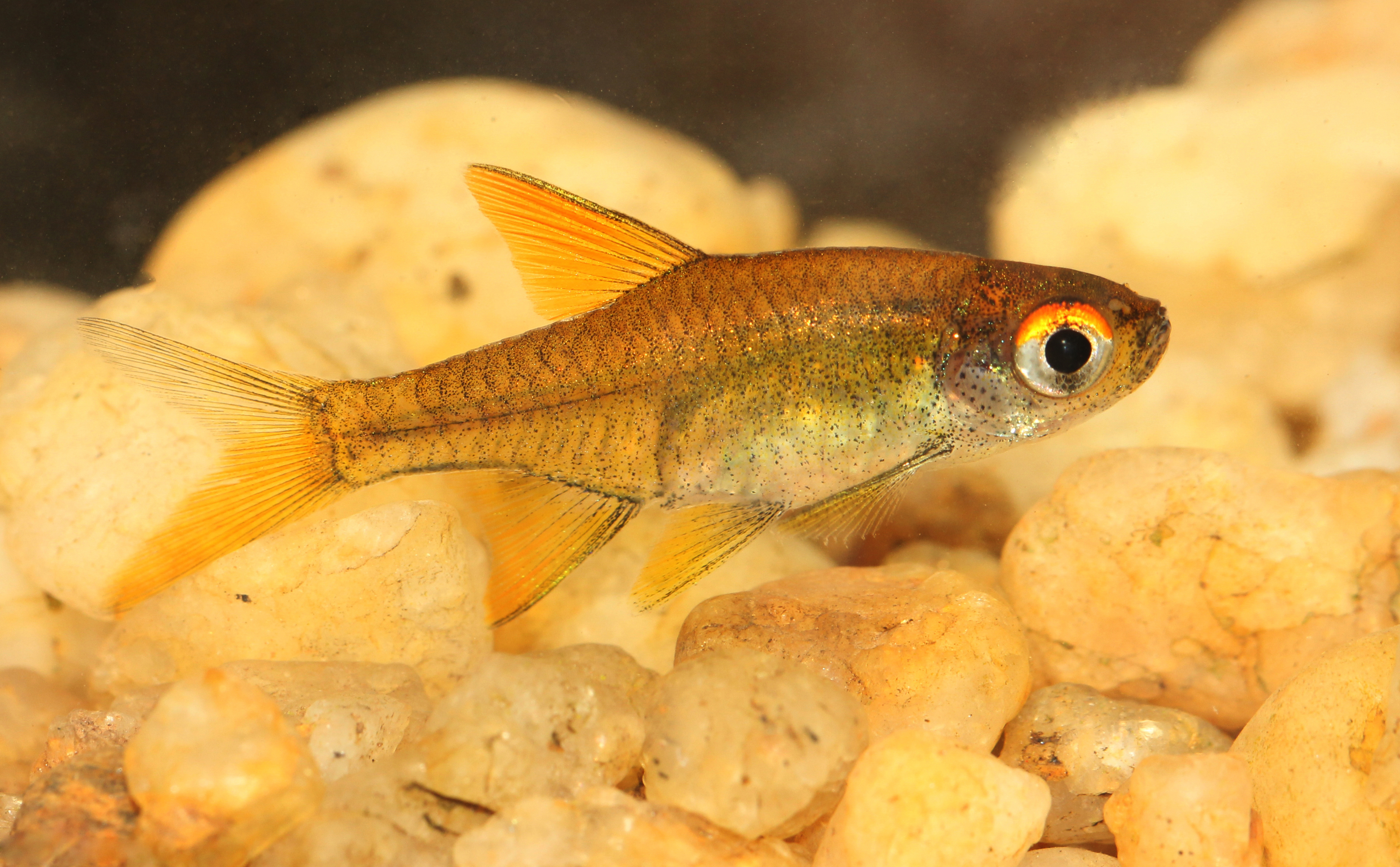
- Rasboroides nigromarginatus

Scientific classification
- Kingdom: Animalia
- Phylum: Chordata
- Class: Actinopterygii
- Order: Cypriniformes
- Family: Danionidae
- Subfamily: Rasborinae
- Genus: Rasboroides; Brittan, 1954

Type species
- Rasbora vaterifloris Deraniyagala, 1930

= Rasboroides =

Genus of fishes

Rasboroides is a genus of freshwater ray-finned fishes belonging to the family Danionidae, the danios or danionins. The fishes in this genus are endemic to Sri Lanka. They are found in small, slow-flowing and shaded streams in the southwestern part of the island. They are essentially restricted to lowlands, although one introduced population occurs at an altitude of 980 m (3,220 ft). They are calm, social and attractively colored fish that sometimes are kept in aquariums.

== Species ==
Historically, there was only a single recognized species in this genus, R. vaterifloris, but in a review in 2013 four species were recognized, and this is followed by FishBase. A comprehensive review in 2018 disputed this and only recognized two species, R. pallidus and R. vaterifloris (the other two considered junior synonyms).

Species	Common name	Image
Rasboroides pallidus Deraniyagala, 1958		
Rasboroides vaterifloris (Deraniyagala, 1930)	Pearly rasbora	
