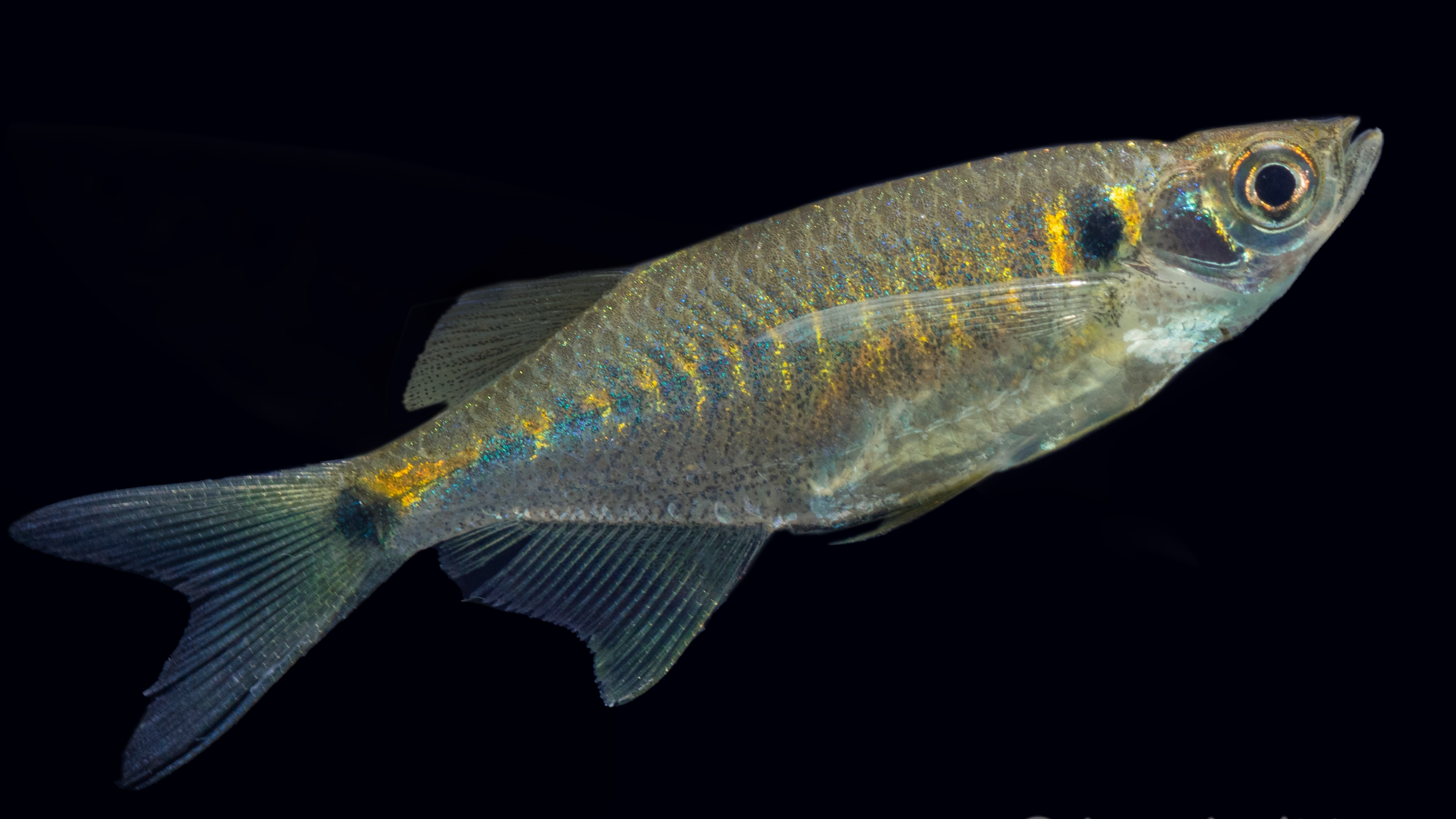
- Indian glass barb L. laubuca

Scientific classification
- Kingdom: Animalia
- Phylum: Chordata
- Class: Actinopterygii
- Order: Cypriniformes
- Family: Danionidae
- Subfamily: Danioninae
- Genus: Laubuka; Bleeker, 1859

Type species
- Cyprinus (Chela) laubuca Hamilton, 1822

Synonyms
- Allochela Silas, 1958

= Laubuka =

Genus of fishes

Laubuka is a genus of freshwater ray-finned fish belonging to the family Danionidae. The fishes in this genus are found in South and Southeast Asia.

== Species ==
These are the currently recognized species in this genus:

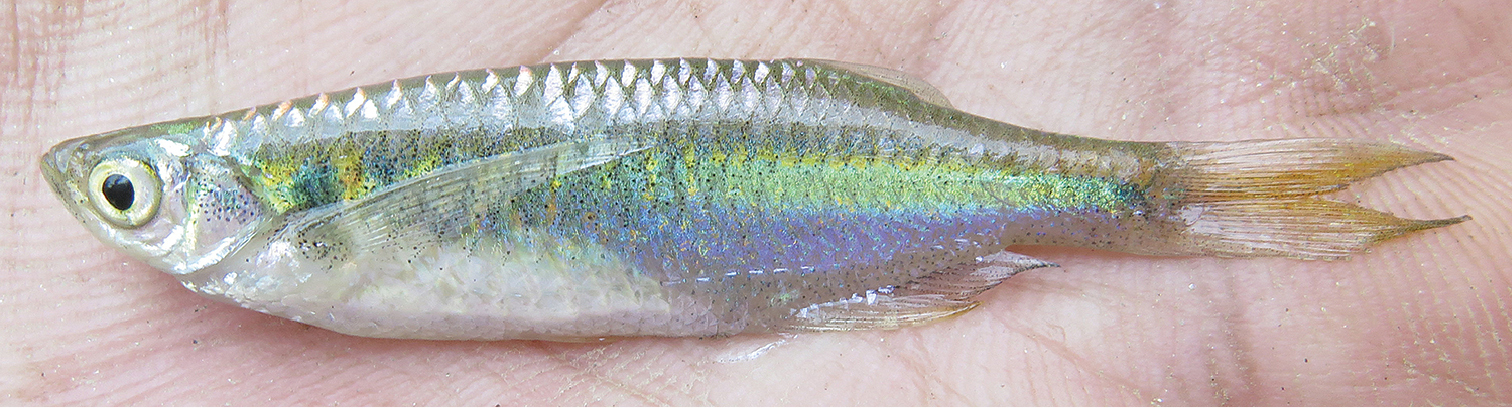
L. tenella

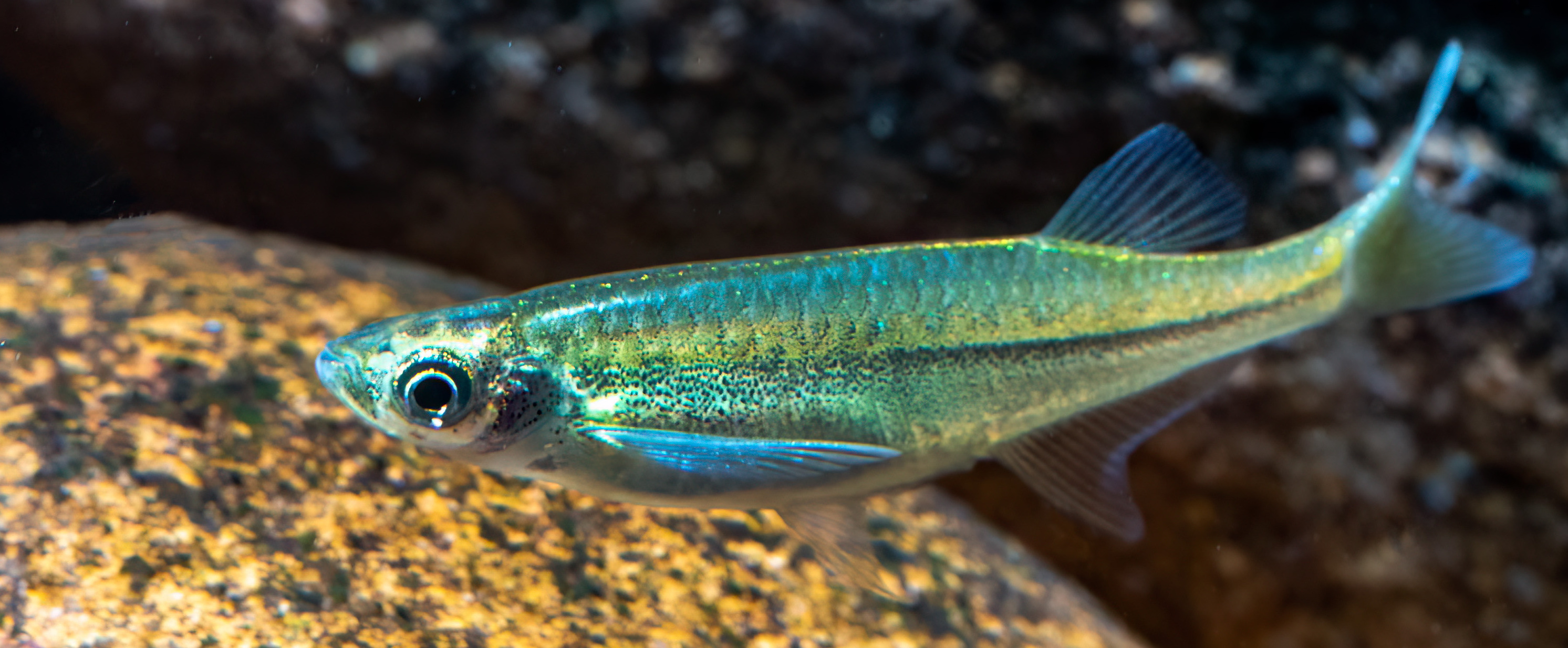
L. trevori

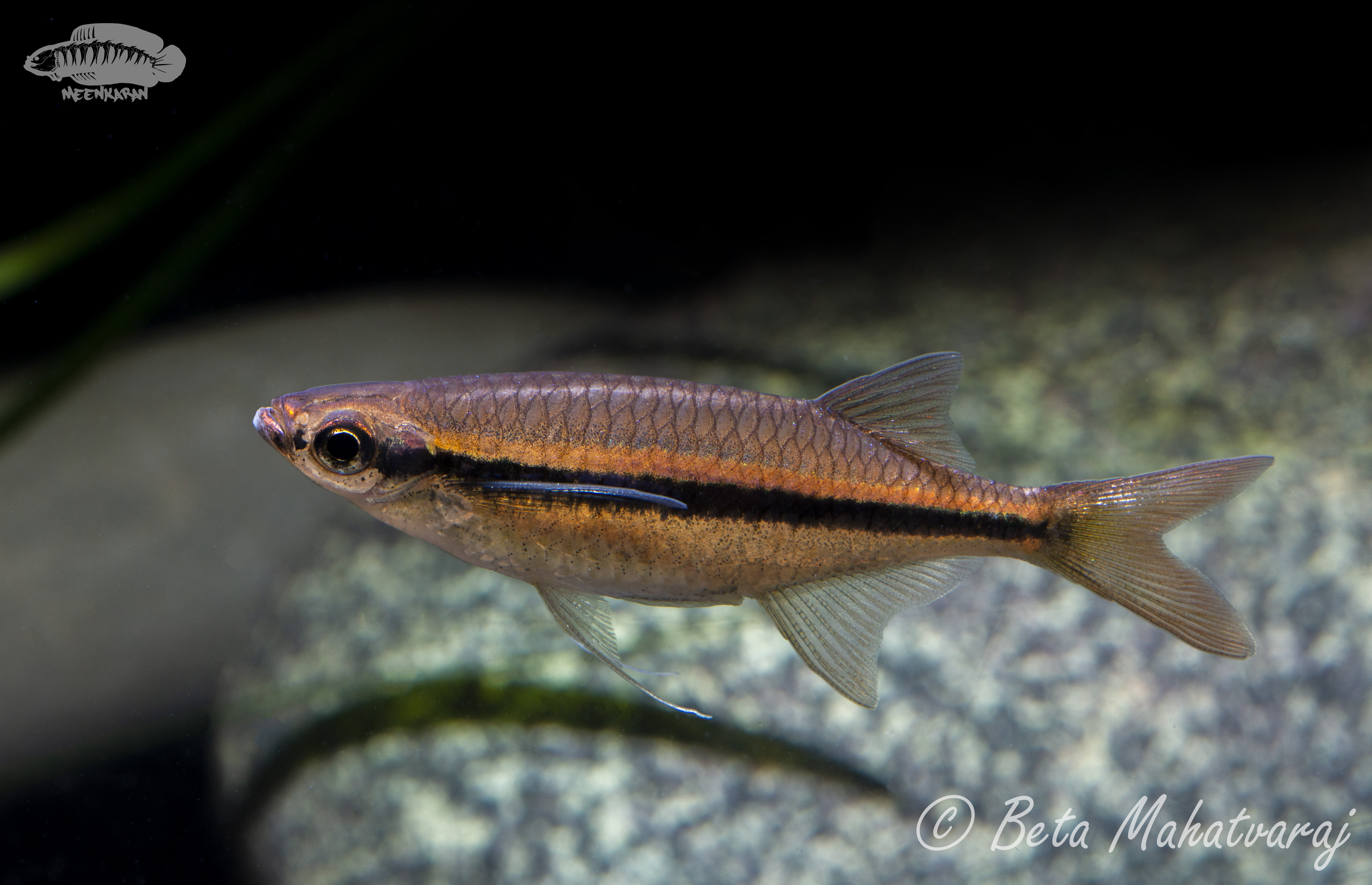
L. fasciata

- Laubuka caeruleostigmata H. M. Smith, 1931 (Leaping barb)
- Laubuka fasciata (Silas 1958)
- Laubuka hema Sudasinghe, Pethiyagoda & Meegaskumbura, 2020
- Laubuka indawgyiana Khin & Chen, 2025
- Laubuka khujairokensis (Arunkumar, 2000)
- Laubuka lankensis (Deraniyagala, 1960)
- Laubuka latens Knight, 2015
- Laubuka laubuca (Hamilton, 1822) (Indian glass barb)
- Laubuka myitthaensis Khin & Chen, 2025
- Laubuka parafasciata Lalramliana, Vanlalhlimpuia & Singh, 2017
- Laubuka siamensis Fowler, 1939
- Laubuka tenella Kullander, Rahman, Norén & Mollah, 2018
- Laubuka trevori Knight, 2015
- Laubuka varuna Pethiyagoda, Kottelat, Silva, Maduwage & Meegaskumbura, 2008
