= Laubuka siamensis =

Conservation status
- Data Deficient (IUCN 3.1)

Scientific classification
- Kingdom: Animalia
- Phylum: Chordata
- Class: Actinopterygii
- Order: Cypriniformes
- Family: Danionidae
- Subfamily: Danioninae
- Genus: Laubuka
- Species: L. siamensis

Binomial name
- Laubuka siamensis Fowler, 1939

Species of fish

Laubuka siamensis is a species of freshwater ray-finned fish belonging to family Danionidae. This species is endemic to Thailand.
