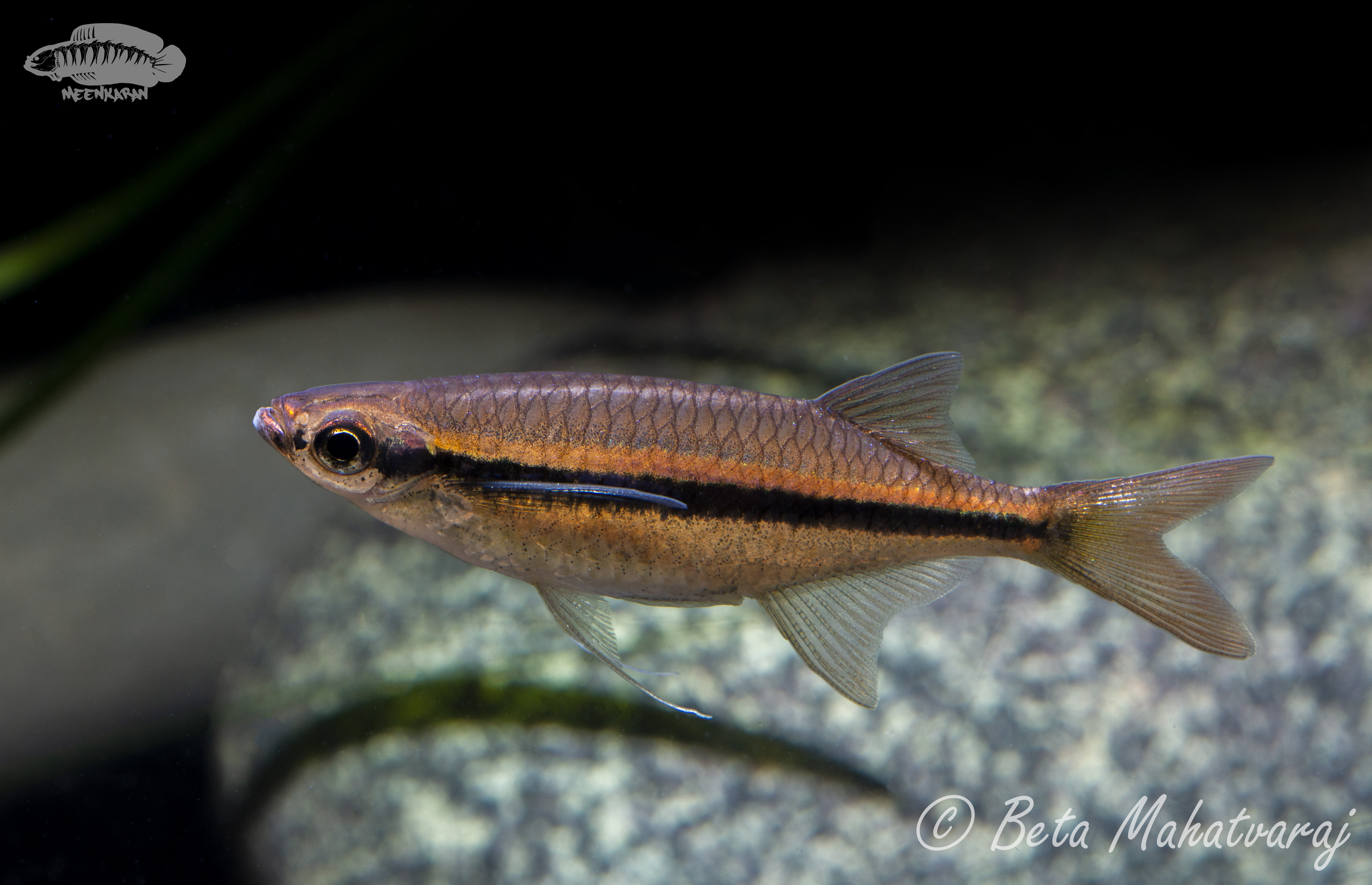

Conservation status
- Vulnerable (IUCN 3.1)

Scientific classification
- Kingdom: Animalia
- Phylum: Chordata
- Class: Actinopterygii
- Order: Cypriniformes
- Family: Danionidae
- Subfamily: Danioninae
- Genus: Laubuka
- Species: L. fasciata

Binomial name
- Laubuka fasciata (Silas, 1958)

Synonyms
- Chela fasciata Silas, 1958

= Laubuka fasciata =

Species of fish

Laubuka fasciata is a species of freshwater ray-finned fish belonging to family Danionidae. This species is endemic to river systems in Kerala, India. It is known as Malabar Hatchet Chela. The fish was first discovered in 1958 in the Anamalai streams by the Keralite fish scientist Eric Godwin Silas. The species was named Fasciata because of it shiny stripe on the body.
