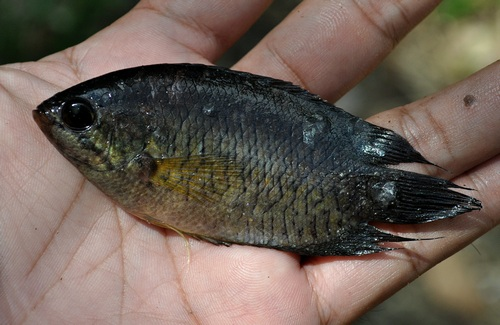

Conservation status
- Least Concern (IUCN 3.1)

Scientific classification
- Kingdom: Animalia
- Phylum: Chordata
- Class: Actinopterygii
- Order: Anabantiformes
- Family: Osphronemidae
- Genus: Belontia
- Species: B. hasselti

Binomial name
- Belontia hasselti (G. Cuvier, 1831)
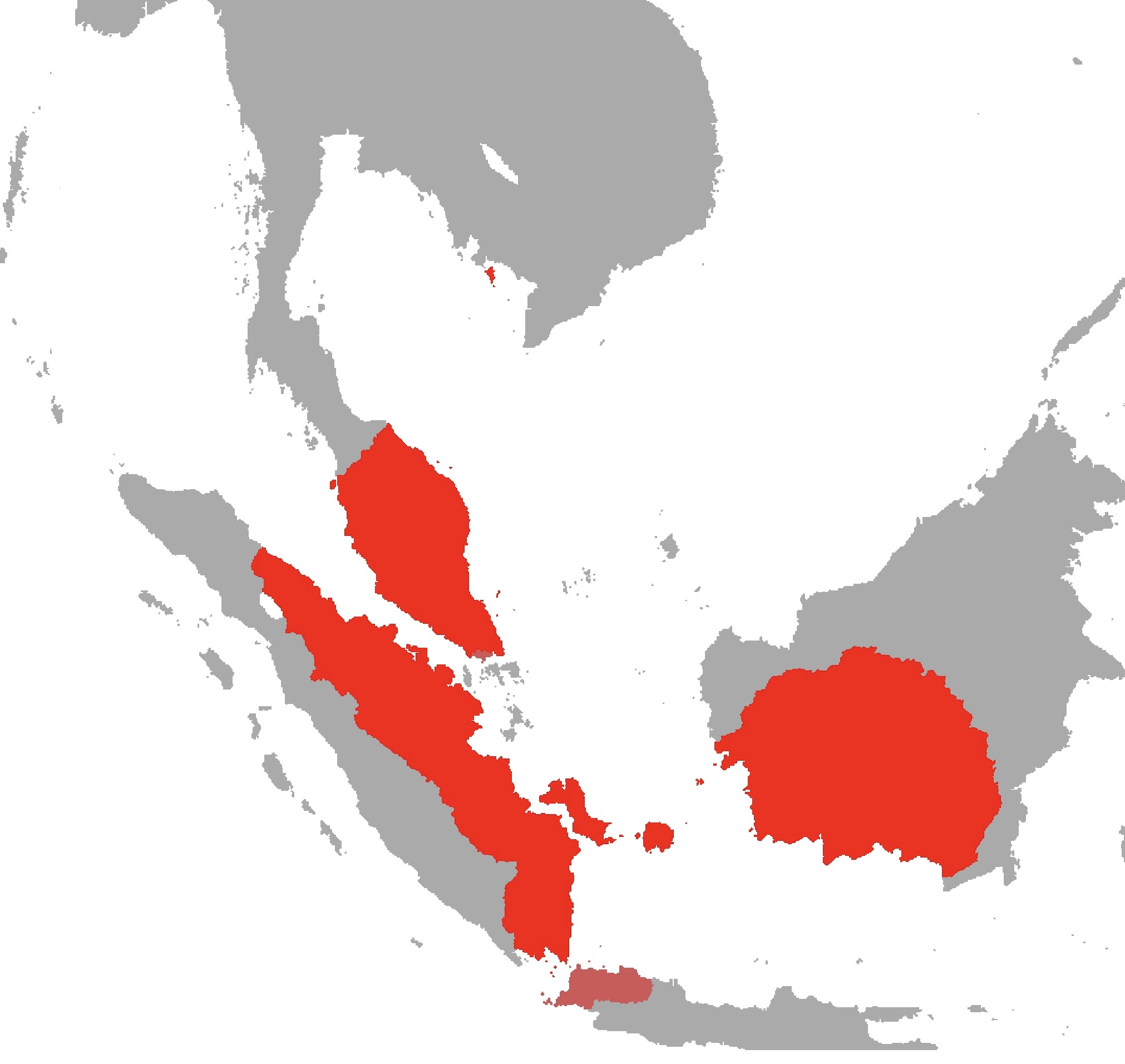
- Red: extant, light red: possibly extant

Synonyms
- Polyacanthus hasselti G. Cuvier, 1831

= Belontia hasselti =

Species of fish

The Malay combtail (Belontia hasselti) is a species of gourami native to southeast Asia where it is found in peat swamps of the Malay Peninsula and the Greater Sunda Islands. This species can reach a length of 20 centimetres (7.9 in) SL. It is a commercially important species and is also found in the aquarium trade. This species was formally described by Georges Cuvier in 1831 with the type locality of Java. The collector of the type was collected in 1820 by the Dutch physician and biologist Johan Coenraad van Hasselt (1797–1823), whom Cuvier honoured in its specific name, with his friend Heinrich Kuhl.
