= Rasbora naggsi =

Conservation status
- Endangered (IUCN 3.1)

Scientific classification
- Kingdom: Animalia
- Phylum: Chordata
- Class: Actinopterygii
- Order: Cypriniformes
- Family: Danionidae
- Subfamily: Rasborinae
- Genus: Rasbora
- Species: R. naggsi

Binomial name
- Rasbora naggsi Silva, Maduwage & Pethiyagoda, 2010

Species of fish

Rasbora naggsi, also known as Naggsi rasbora or Naggsi's striped rasbora, is a minnow endemic to Sri Lanka. The fish was discovered from a stream running across the Sabaragamuwa Campus in Belihul-Oya, Sri Lanka.

== Etymology ==
This species is named after the malacologist Fred Naggs. (Note: Hence, the common names should logically be "Naggs rasbora" or "Naggs' striped rasbora", the "-i" in the specific name being a suffix used to indicate patronymy.)

== Description ==
Rasbora naggsi can grow to 7.7 cm (3.0 in) standard length.

== Habitat ==
Rasbora naggsi occurs in fast-flowing, shaded streams with boulders and sandy substratum.

== See also ==
- Rasbora armitagei
