= Laubuka khujairokensis =

Conservation status
- Vulnerable (IUCN 3.1)

Scientific classification
- Kingdom: Animalia
- Phylum: Chordata
- Class: Actinopterygii
- Order: Cypriniformes
- Family: Danionidae
- Subfamily: Danioninae
- Genus: Laubuka
- Species: L. khujairokensis

Binomial name
- Laubuka khujairokensis (Arunkumar, 2000)

Synonyms
- Laubuca khujairokensis (Arunkumar, 2000); Chela khujairokensis Arunkumar, 2000

Species of fish

Laubuka khujairokensis is a species of freshwater ray-finned fish belonging to the family Danionidae. This species is known to occur only in the Khujairok Stream, a tributary of the Yu River, at Moreh, near the border between Manipur and Myanmar.
