= List of introduced fish in Sri Lanka =

Sri Lanka is a tropical island situated close to the southern tip of India. It is situated in the middle of the Indian Ocean. This is a partial list of fish species introduced to Sri Lanka.

== Class: Actinopterygii - Ray-finned fishes ==
Since Sri Lanka was ruled by the Portuguese, Dutch, and British. At various junctures, these nations introduced a number of exotic species, which included mammals, plants, birds, and fish. After Sri Lanka secured its independence, the introductions continued unabated, and the breeding of exotic aquarium fish for export became popular.

The deliberate and accidental introduction of exotic fish into Sri Lanka has led to serious ecological damage, as many of these species disrupt ecosystems, reducing the diversity of endemic fish to a degree that causes extinction. Invasive introduced exotic fish, such as the Sail-fin pleco, also cause economic damage by reducing the amount of local fish caught by fishermen while being of no or little economical value themselves. Most of the invasive exotic fish were originally brought for commercial purposes, mainly as aquarium fish and for food.

An introduced, alien, exotic, non-indigenous, or non-native species, or simply an introduction, is a species living outside its native distributional range, which has arrived there by human activity, either deliberate or accidental. Non-native species can have various effects on the local ecosystem. Introduced species that become established and spread beyond the place of introduction are called invasive species. Some have a negative effect on a local ecosystem. Some introduced species may have no negative effect or only minor impact. Some species have been introduced intentionally to combat pests.

There are 24 introduced fish species which inhabit all freshwater, brackish water and marine waters.

=== Order: Cypriniformes ===
==== Family: Cyprinidae - Carps and allies ====
Cyprinids are stomachless fish with toothless jaws. Even so, food can be effectively chewed by the gill rakers of the specialized last gill bow.

Name	Binomial	Status	Image
Bighead carp	Hypophthalmichthys nobilis		
Goldfish	Carassius auratus		
Indian carp	Catla catla		
Grass carp	Ctenopharyngodon idella		
Common carp	Cyprinus carpio		
Silver carp	Hypophthalmichthys molitrix		
Mrigal carp	Cirrhinus mrigala		
Rohu	Labeo rohita		

=== Order: Salmoniformes - Salmons ===
==== Family: Salmonidae ====
All salmonids spawn in fresh water, but in many cases, the fish spend most of their lives at sea, returning to the rivers only to reproduce. This lifecycle is described as anadromous. They are slender fish, with rounded scales and forked tails.

Name	Binomial	Status	Image
Rainbow trout	Oncorhynchus mykiss	invasive	

=== Order: Cyprinodontiformes - Toothcarps ===
==== Family: Poeciliidae - Guppy and swordtails ====
They are extensively used for mosquito control, poeciliids can today be found in all tropical and subtropical areas of the world.

Name	Binomial	Status	Image
Mosquitofish	Gambusia affinis		
Guppy	Poecilia reticulata		
Green swordtail	Xiphophorus hellerii		
Common platy	Xiphophorus maculatus		

=== Order: Perciformes ===
==== Family: Cichlidae - Cichlids ====
Cichlids are popular freshwater fish kept in the home aquarium. Cichlids tend to be of medium size, ovate in shape, and slightly laterally compressed, and generally similar to the North American sunfishes in morphology, behavior, and ecology.

Name	Binomial	Status	Image
Redbreast tilapia	Coptodon rendalli		
African jewelfish	Hemichromis bimaculatus		
Nile tilapia	Oreochromis niloticus		
Mossambique tilapia	Oreochromis mossambicus		
Wami tilapia	Oreochromis urolepis		
Redbelly tilapia	Tilapia zillii		

==== Family: Osphronemidae - Gouramis ====
Many gouramis have an elongated, feeler-like ray at the front of each of their pelvic fins. Many species show parental care: some are mouthbrooders.

Name	Binomial	Status	Image
Snakeskin gourami	Trichopodus pectoralis		
Three spot gourami	Trichopodus trichopterus		
Giant gourami	Osphronemus goramy		

==== Family: Helostomatidae - Kissing gouramis ====
Single species is known. The kissing gourami is a popular aquarium fish.

Name	Binomial	Status	Image
Kissing gourami	Helostoma temminckii		

=== Order: Siluriformes - Catfishes ===
==== Family: Loricariidae - Suckermouth fishes ====
These fish are noted for the bony plates covering their bodies and their suckermouths. They are popular as aquarium fish.

Name	Binomial	Status	Image
Sail-fin pleco	Pterygoplichthys multiradiatus		

=== Order: Osteoglossiformes - Bony tongues ===
==== Family: Notopteridae - Knifefishes ====
Known as knifefish or featherbacks, have slender, elongated, bodies, giving them a knife-like appearance. The caudal fin is small and fused with the anal fin, which runs most of the length of the body. Where present, the dorsal fin is small and narrow, giving rise to the common name of "featherback".

Name	Binomial	Status	Image
Clown knifefish	Chitala ornata	invasive	
