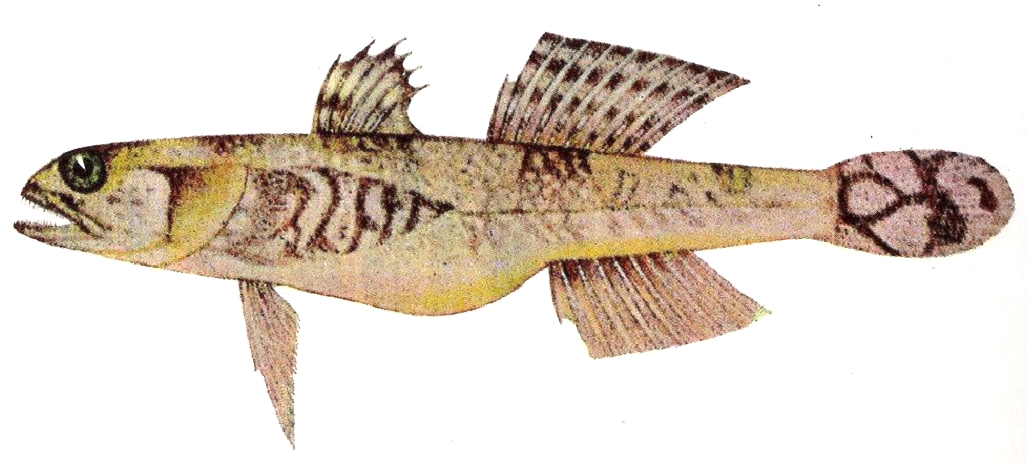

Scientific classification
- Kingdom: Animalia
- Phylum: Chordata
- Class: Actinopterygii
- Division: Teleostei
- Order: Gobiiformes
- Family: Oxudercidae
- Genus: Schismatogobius
- Species: S. insignus

Binomial name
- Schismatogobius insignus (Herre, 1927)

Synonyms
- Gobiosoma insignum Herre, 1927

= Schismatogobius insignus =

Species of fish

Schismatogobius insignus is a species of goby endemic to the Philippines. It is a small fish, growing to a maximum length of only 4.4 cm (1.7 in). It is found in coastal marine, brackish, and freshwater habitats.

== Description ==
Schismatogobius insignus grows to a maximum length of 4.4 cm (1.7 in). It has a laterally compressed head and a protuberant belly. The mouth is oblique and large, situated at the tip of the head with the lower and upper jaws roughly equal in size. It has three rows of slender, erect, and pointed teeth on each jaw.

The first dorsal fin is small and widely separated from the second. The second dorsal fin is roughly the same size as the anal fin. The pectoral and ventral fins are pointed and are about the same lengths.

It has a whitish body with scattered tiny brown spots. Three broad diagonal bars run from its back down to its belly. The pectoral fins have three or four transverse rows of brown spots. Just behind the pectoral fins are a series of stripes. The first dorsal fin has two black or brown longitudinal bands, while the second dorsal fin has four. The caudal fin has a white spot at its base, surrounded by dark brown bands. Two large white spots are present above and below. The rest of the caudal fin is crisscrossed by dark brown bands. The ventral and anal fins are colorless.

== Taxonomy and nomenclature ==
Schismatogobius insignus was first described by the American ichthyologist Albert William Herre in 1927 from specimens recovered in Dumaguete and Negros Oriental, Philippines. It belongs to the genus Schismatogobius of the subfamily Gobionellinae, family Oxudercidae.

The specific name is derived from Latin insignis ("distinguished"), in reference to the handsome coloration of the fish.

== Distribution and habitat ==
Schismatogobius insignus is endemic to the Philippines. It is a demersal fish and can be found in marine, brackish, and freshwater habitats. Its coloration makes it difficult to see in sand and gravel substrates.
