= Schismatogobius fuligimentus =

Conservation status
- Data Deficient (IUCN 3.1)

Scientific classification
- Kingdom: Animalia
- Phylum: Chordata
- Class: Actinopterygii
- Order: Gobiiformes
- Family: Oxudercidae
- Genus: Schismatogobius
- Species: S. fuligimentus

Binomial name
- Schismatogobius fuligimentus I. S. Chen, Séret, Pöllabauer & K. T. Shao, 2001

Species of fish

Schismatogobius fuligimentus is a species of freshwater goby endemic to New Caledonia, where it is found in shallow, slow-moving streams with gravel substrates at altitudes up to 250 m (820 ft), although it is suspected of being amphidromous. Males of this species can reach a standard length of 2.9 cm (1.1 in), while females can reach 3.8 cm (1.5 in).

It is a slender, generally cylindrical goby. It is generally yellow with brown or black markings and displays sexual dimorphism; the underside of the head is yellow in males, black in females. It can be distinguished from all its congeners by having a lower number (13 or 14) of rays in the pectoral fins.
