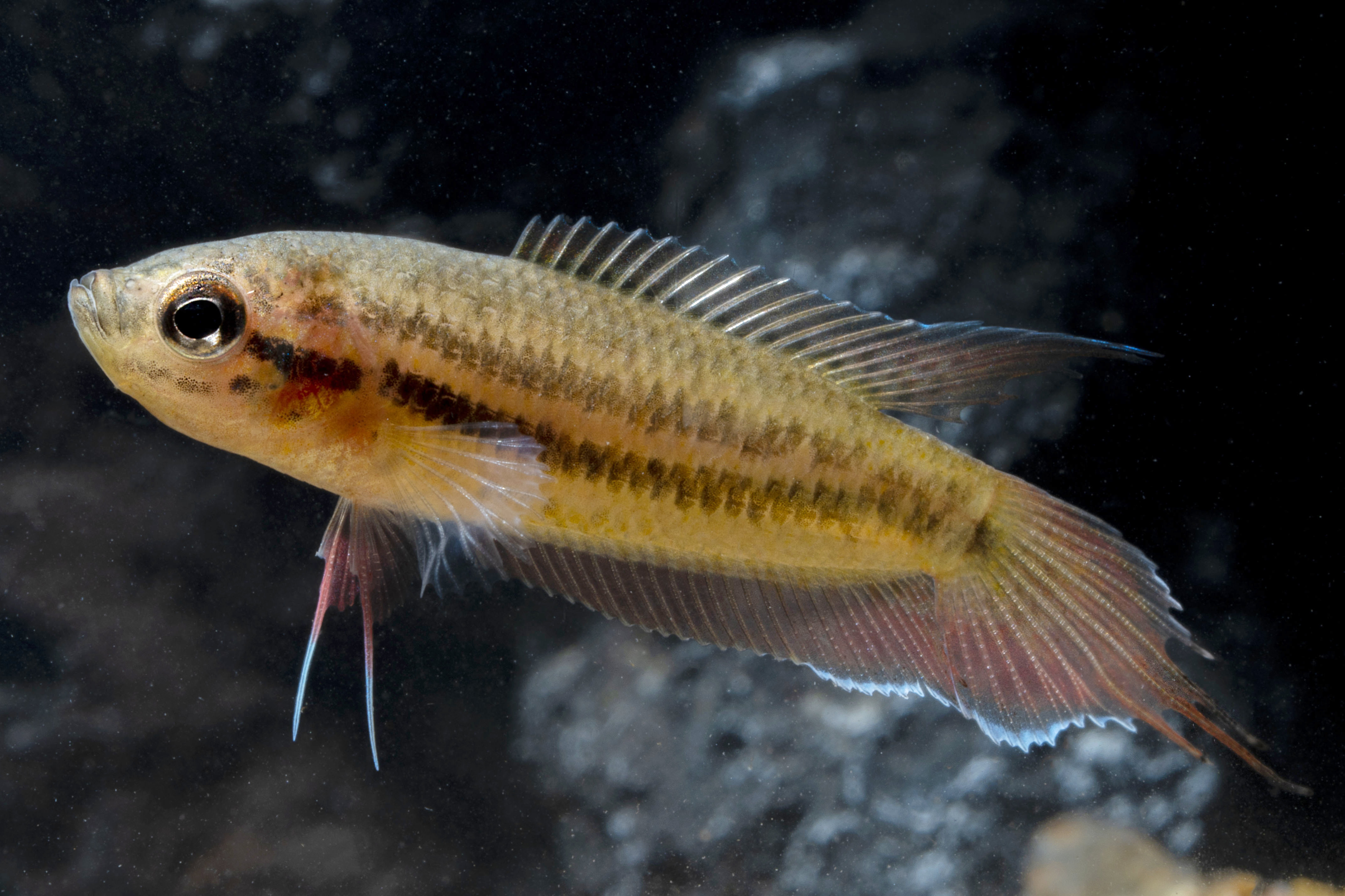

Conservation status
- Vulnerable (IUCN 3.1)

Scientific classification
- Kingdom: Animalia
- Phylum: Chordata
- Class: Actinopterygii
- Order: Anabantiformes
- Family: Osphronemidae
- Genus: Pseudosphromenus
- Species: P. dayi

Binomial name
- Pseudosphromenus dayi (Köhler, 1908)
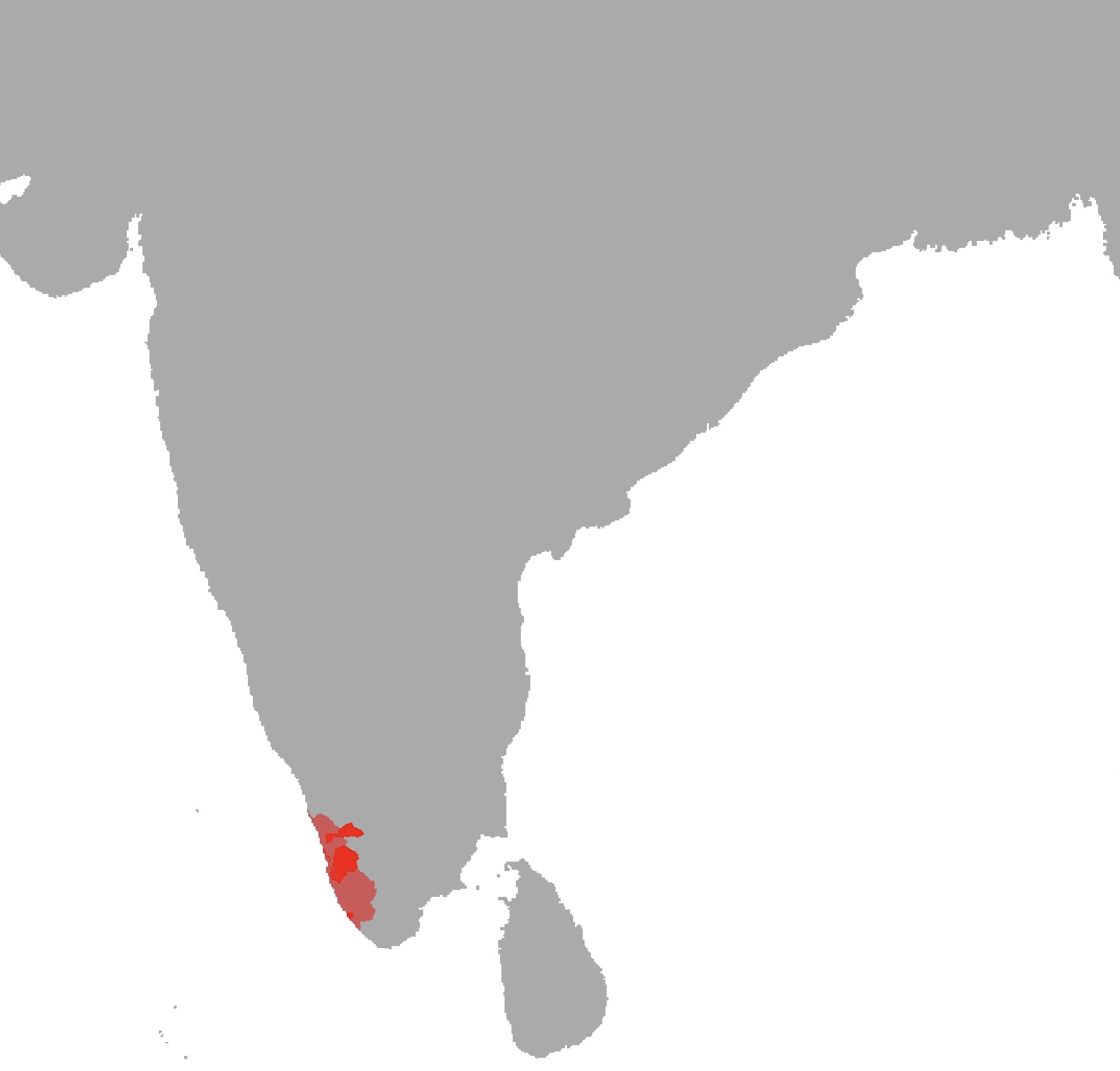
- Red:extant, Light red: possibly extant

Synonyms
- Macropodus dayi (Köhler, 1908); Parosphromenus dayi (Köhler, 1908); Polyacanthus dayi Köhler, 1908

= Pseudosphromenus dayi =

Species of fish

Pseudosphromenus dayi or Indian spiketail betta is a species of freshwater ray finned fish from the subfamily Macropodusinae, part of the gourami family Osphronemidae. It occurs in Kerala on both the coastal regions and the Western Ghats. It is a species of still or slow flowing waters, especially lakes, ditches and swamps in both fresh and brackish waters. Pseudosphromenus dayi is a bubble nester, the male creates a nest made of bubbles under an overhang or a leaf. The females lays eggs which drop to the substrate and are picked up by both fishes in the pair and placed in the bubble nest. The name Polyacanthus cupanus dayi was first published in 1908 by Köhler in 1908 but Catalog of Fishes refers to this as a nomen nudum and attributes the valid use of the name, with a formal description, to P. Engmann in 1909. The type locality is given as Malacca which is probably an error and should be Kerala. The specific name honors the British ichthyologist and author of the Fishes of India, Francis Day (1830–1889).
