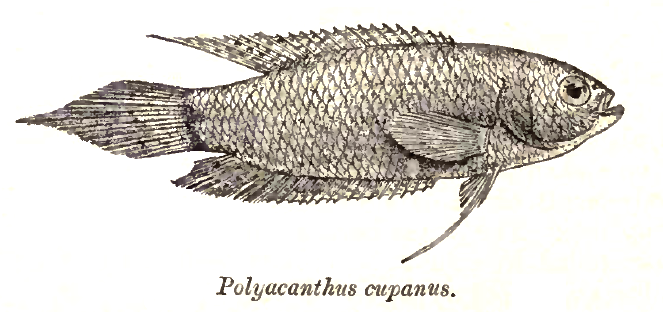
- Pseudosphromenus cupanus

Scientific classification
- Kingdom: Animalia
- Phylum: Chordata
- Class: Actinopterygii
- Order: Anabantiformes
- Family: Osphronemidae
- Subfamily: Macropodusinae
- Genus: Pseudosphromenus; Bleeker, 1879

Type species
- Polyacanthus cupanus G. Cuvier, 1831
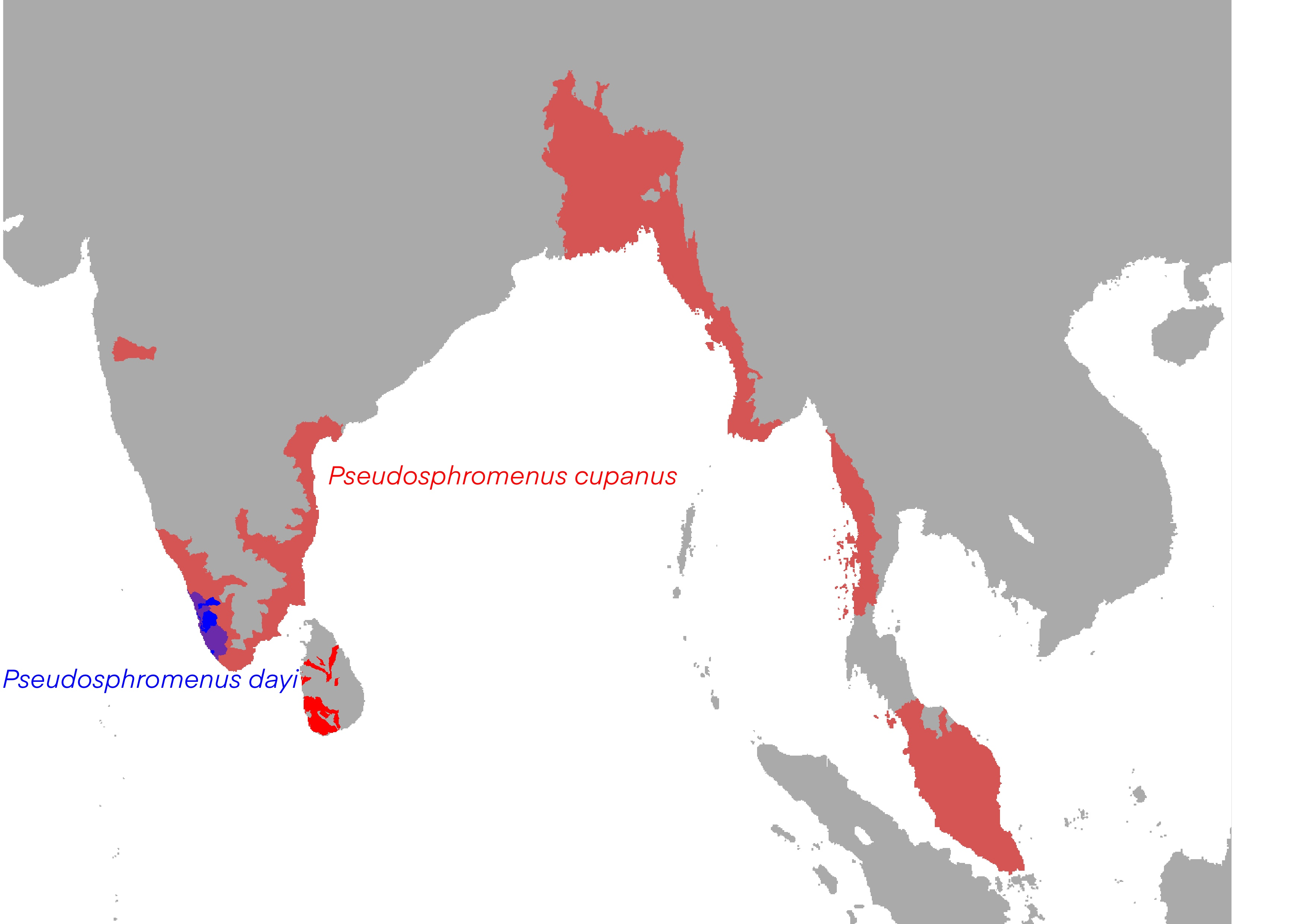
- Red/Blue: extant, Light red/blue: possibly extant

= Pseudosphromenus =

Genus of fishes

Pseudosphromenus is a genus of medium-small gouramies native to south and southeast Asia.

== Species ==
There are currently 2 recognized species in this genus:

- Pseudosphromenus cupanus (G. Cuvier, 1831) (Spiketail paradisefish)
- Pseudosphromenus dayi (Köhler, 1908)
