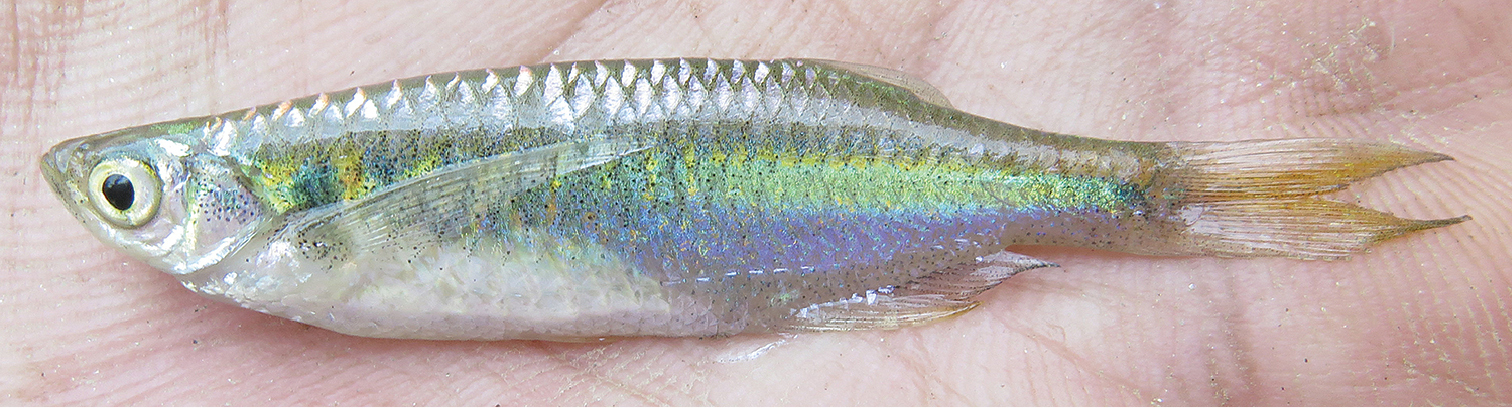

Scientific classification
- Kingdom: Animalia
- Phylum: Chordata
- Class: Actinopterygii
- Order: Cypriniformes
- Family: Danionidae
- Subfamily: Danioninae
- Genus: Laubuka
- Species: L. tenella

Binomial name
- Laubuka tenella Kullander, Rahman, Norén & Mollah, 2018

= Laubuka tenella =

Species of fish

Laubuka tenella is a species of freshwater ray-finned fish belonging to family Danionidae. It was described in 2018 from specimens collected in the small streams of Cox's Bazar and Teknaf in Bangladesh and Thandwe river drainage in Western Myanmar.

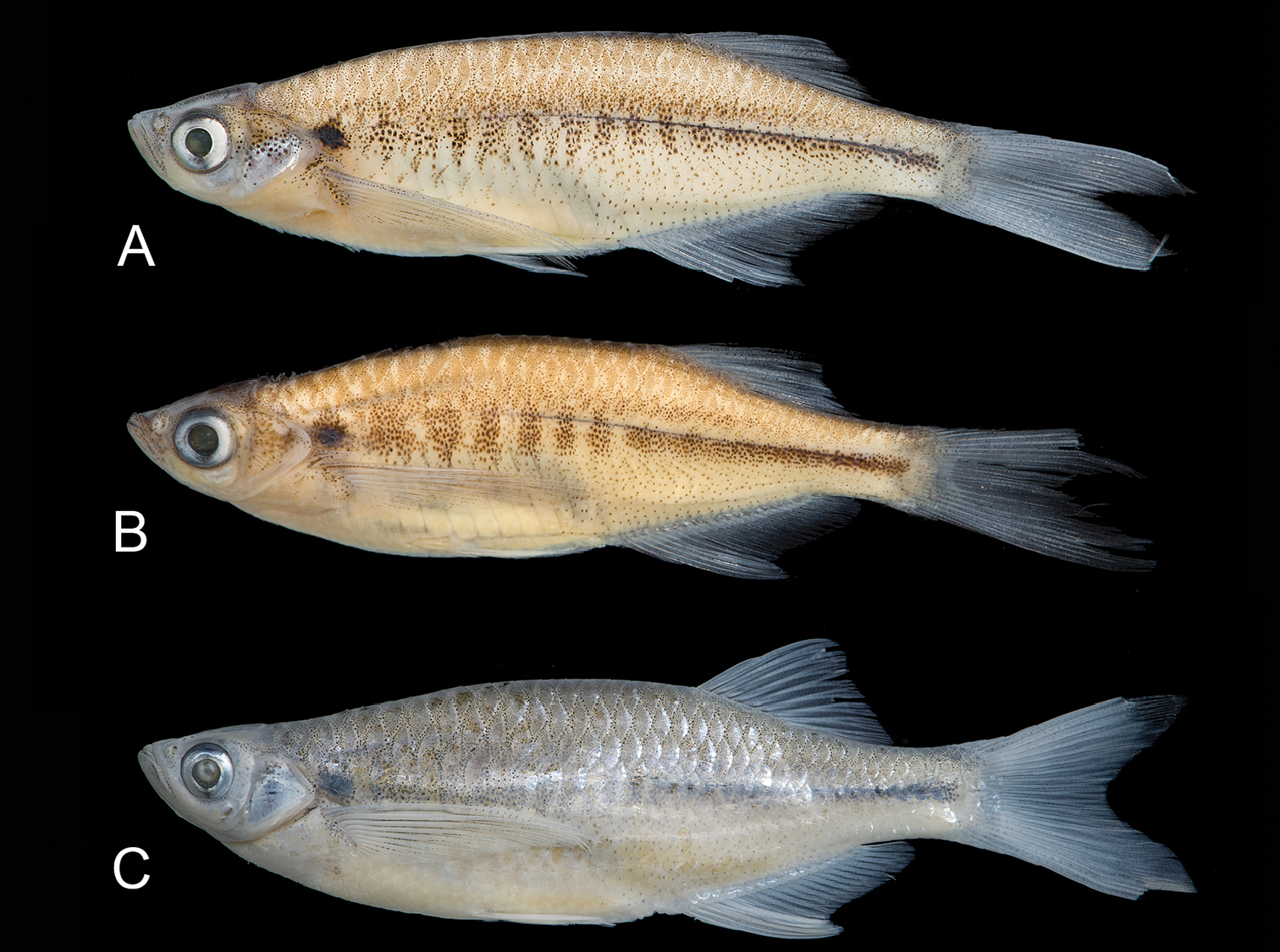
Holotype (A), paratypes (B-C)

== Description ==
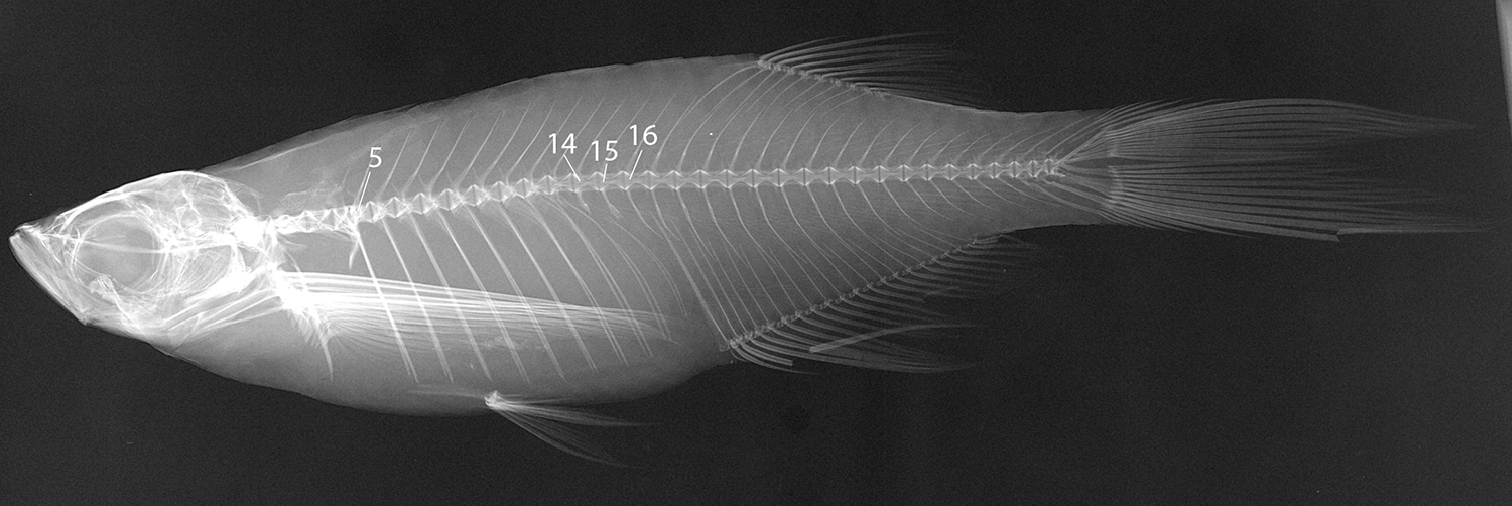
X-ray

Body length is 42.1 mm SL. Body elongate and strongly compressed laterally. Eyes large. Barbels and tubercles absent. Scales cycloid, thin and transparent. Lab specimen are pale yellowish white with diffuse grey or black markings. Brown stripe found on dorsal midline. Thin black or brown stripe runs along middle of caudal peduncle. Fins hyaline.
