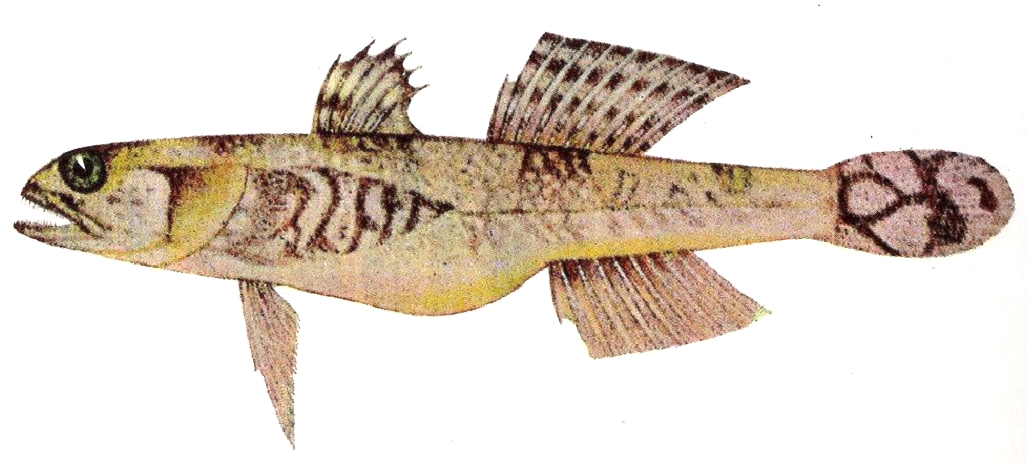
- Schismatogobius insignus

Scientific classification
- Kingdom: Animalia
- Phylum: Chordata
- Class: Actinopterygii
- Order: Gobiiformes
- Family: Oxudercidae
- Subfamily: Gobionellinae
- Genus: Schismatogobius de Beaufort, 1912

Type species
- Schismatogobius bruynisi de Beaufort, 1912

= Schismatogobius =

Genus of fishes

Schismatogobius is a genus of fish in the subfamily Gobionellinae. They are native to southern and eastern Asia, Australia and the Pacific Islands. Adults dwell in freshwater habitat such as streams and rivers, where they live along the sand and gravel substrates.

These fish are not always obvious in the habitat, because they are small and cryptic. They lack scales and have variable color patterns, with no two individuals of a given species alike. Compared to those of females, the jaws of males are "hugely large".

== Species ==
The 21 recognized species in this genus are:

- Schismatogobius alleni Keith, Lord & Larson, 2017
- Schismatogobius ampluvinculus I. S. Chen, K. T. Shao & L. S. Fang, 1995
- Schismatogobius arscuttoli Keith, Lord & Hubert, 2017
- Schismatogobius baitabag Keith, Lord & Larson, 2017
- Schismatogobius bruynisi de Beaufort, 1912
- Schismatogobius bussoni Keith, Hubert, Limmon & Darhuddin, 2017
- Schismatogobius deraniyagalai Kottelat & Pethiyagoda, 1989 (redneck goby)
- Schismatogobius essi Keith, Lord & Larson, 2017
- Schismatogobius fuligimentus I. S. Chen, Séret, Pöllabauer & K. T. Shao, 2001
- Schismatogobius hoesei Keith, Lord & Larson, 2017
- Schismatogobius insignus (Herre, 1927)
- Schismatogobius limmoni Keith & Hubert, 2021
- Schismatogobius marmoratus (W. K. H. Peters, 1868)
- Schismatogobius mondo Keith, Lord & Larson, 2017
- Schismatogobius risdawatiae Keith, Darhuddin, Sukmono & Hubert, 2017
- Schismatogobius sapoliensis Keith, Darhuddin, Limmon & Hubert, 2018
- Schismatogobius saurii Keith, Lord, Hadiaty & Hubert, 2017
- Schismatogobius tiola Keith, Lord & Larson, 2017
- Schismatogobius tuimanua Keith, Lord & Larson, 2017
- Schismatogobius vanuatuensis Keith, Marquet & R. E. Watson, 2004 (Vanuatu goby)
- Schismatogobius vitiensis A. P. Jenkins & Boseto, 2005

Synonyms

- Schismatogobius ninja Maeda, Saeki & Satoh, 2017; valid as S. saurii
