= Labeo heladiva =

Scientific classification
- Kingdom: Animalia
- Phylum: Chordata
- Class: Actinopterygii
- Division: Teleostei
- Order: Cypriniformes
- Family: Cyprinidae
- Genus: Labeo
- Species: L. heladiva

Binomial name
- Labeo heladiva Sudasinghe, Ranasinghe, Goonatilake and Meegaskumbura, 2018

Synonyms
- Labeo dussumieri (Günther, 1868)

Species of fish

Labeo heladiva, is a species of freshwater fish in the family Cyprinidae. It is endemic to Sri Lanka. Earlier considered as the same species as Labeo dussumieri in India, recent phylogenetic and physiological differences suggest that Sri Lankan population is a distinct species.

== Description ==
Maximum size 277 mm. Two pairs of barbels (maxillary and rostral) present. Dorsal fin has 12–13 branched rays. There are 44–51 scales on lateral line. Anal fin originate with orange-colored patches. Caudal peduncle short. Dorsolateral eyes are small. Rostral fold poor and slightly overlapping upper lip. Body silvery gray dorsally which becomes paler laterally. Venter white. Black blotch found at caudal peduncle. Dorsal, caudal and pectoral fins ranges from dull grayish-brown to hyaline. Pelvic and anal fins light grayish-brown to hyaline. Tubercles whitish. There are 9–13, hazy black lines running from opercular membrane to caudal peduncle.

== Etymology ==
The specific name heladiva meaning Land of Hela people, which is a historical Sinhala name for Sri Lanka.

== Habitat ==
It is exclusively found on lowland floodplain of both the dry and the wet zones. Some specimens were recorded from estuaries, which reveals its tolerance of salinity.
