= Laubuka lankensis =

Conservation status
- Near Threatened (IUCN 3.1)

Scientific classification
- Kingdom: Animalia
- Phylum: Chordata
- Class: Actinopterygii
- Order: Cypriniformes
- Family: Danionidae
- Subfamily: Danioninae
- Genus: Laubuka
- Species: L. lankensis

Binomial name
- Laubuka lankensis (Deraniyagala, 1960)

Synonyms
- Chela laubuca lankensis Deraniyagala, 1960; Laubuca lankensis (Deraniyagala, 1960); Laubuka insularis Pethiyagoda, Kottelat, Silva, Maduwage & Meegaskumbura, 2008

Species of fish

Laubuka lankensis, also known as the Sri Lanka blue laubuca, is a species of freshwater ray-finned fish belonging to family Danionidae. This species is endemic to Sri Lanka. It is a freshwater species widely distributed throughout the lowland dry zone of the island. It grows to 5.8 cm (2.3 in) standard length.
