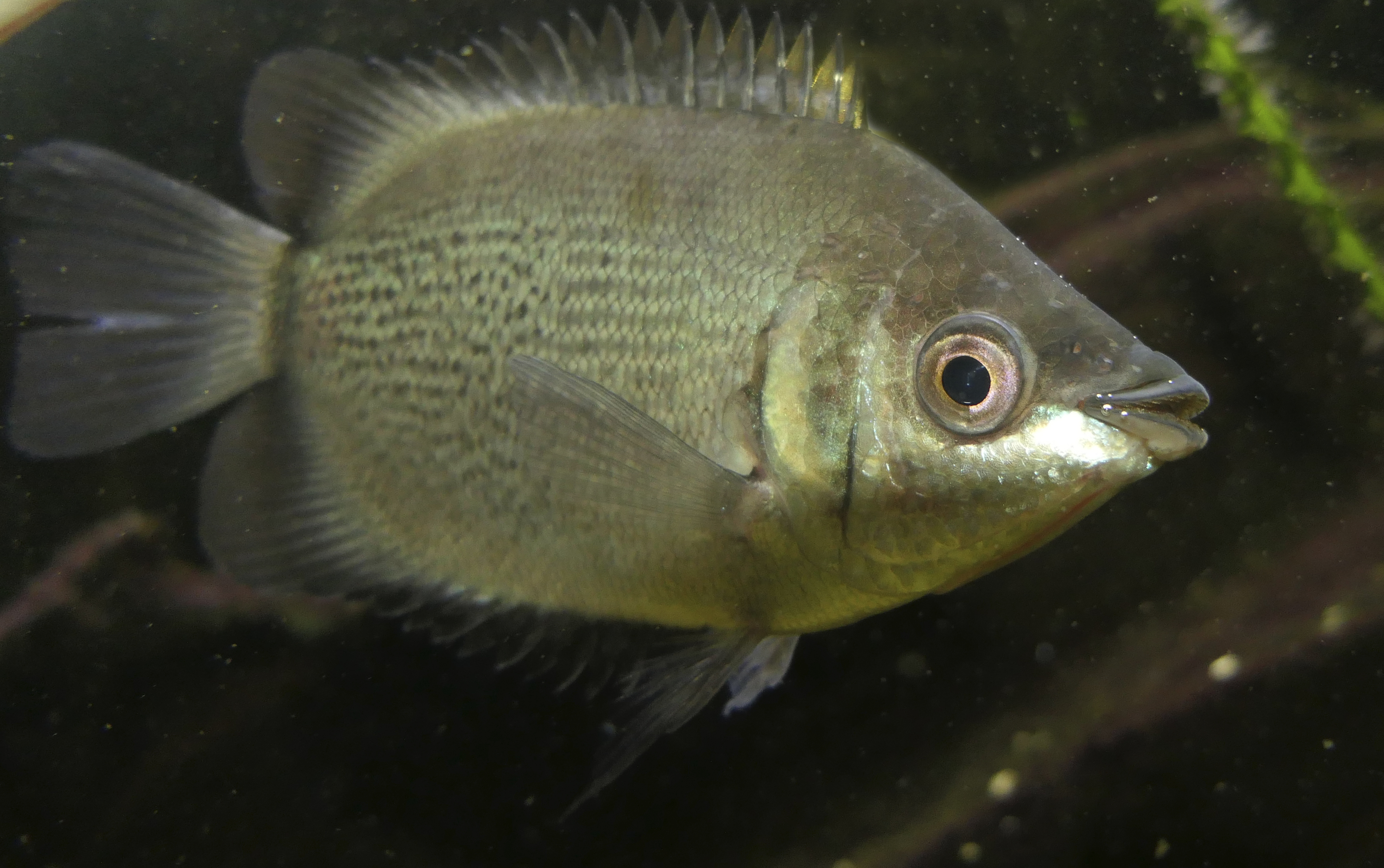

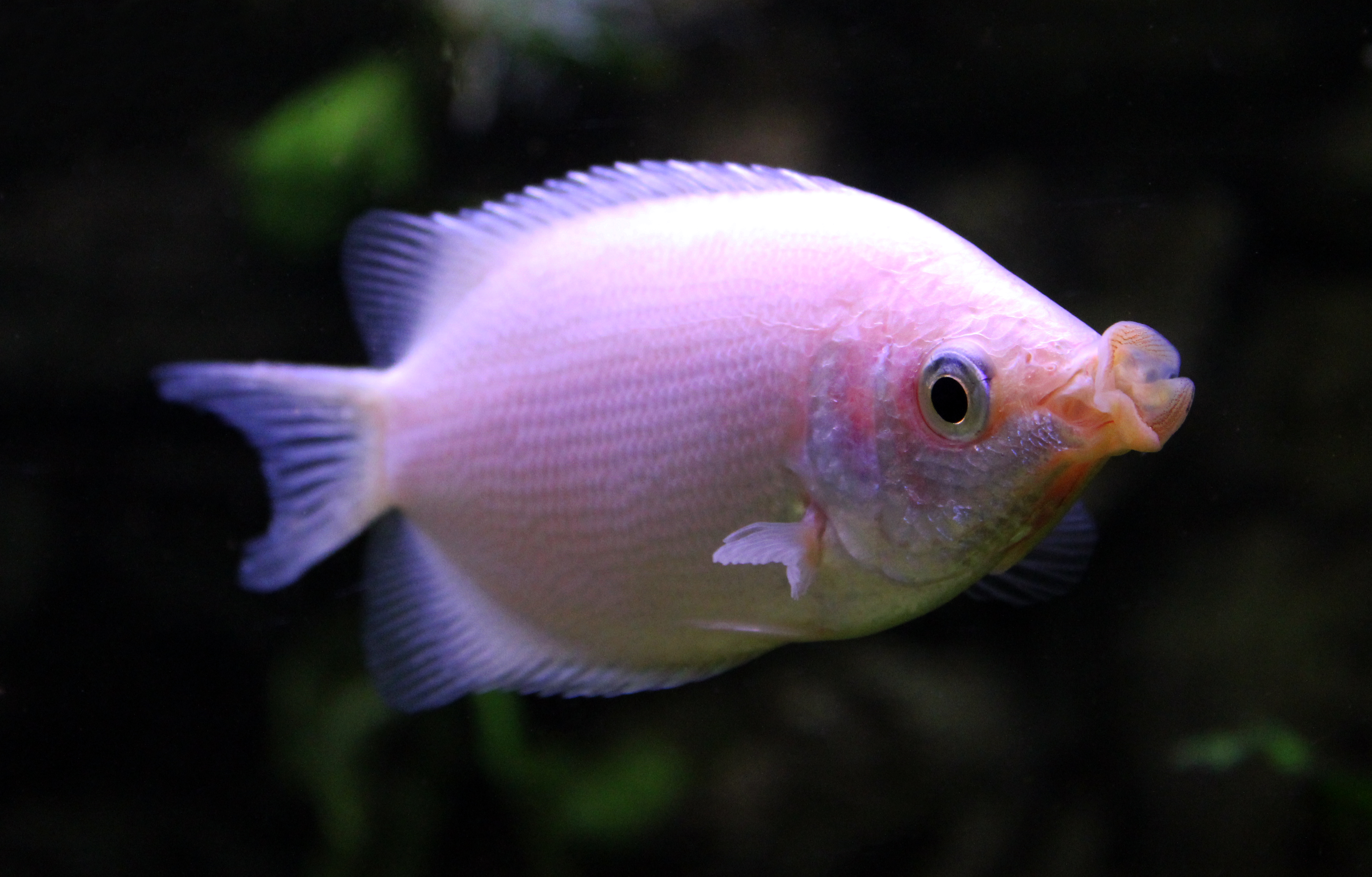
- Natural form above, Leucistic form below

Conservation status
- Least Concern (IUCN 3.1)

Scientific classification
- Kingdom: Animalia
- Phylum: Chordata
- Class: Actinopterygii
- Division: Teleostei
- Order: Anabantiformes
- Family: Helostomatidae; T. N. Gill, 1872
- Genus: Helostoma; G. Cuvier, 1829
- Species: H. temminckii

Binomial name
- Helostoma temminckii G. Cuvier, 1829
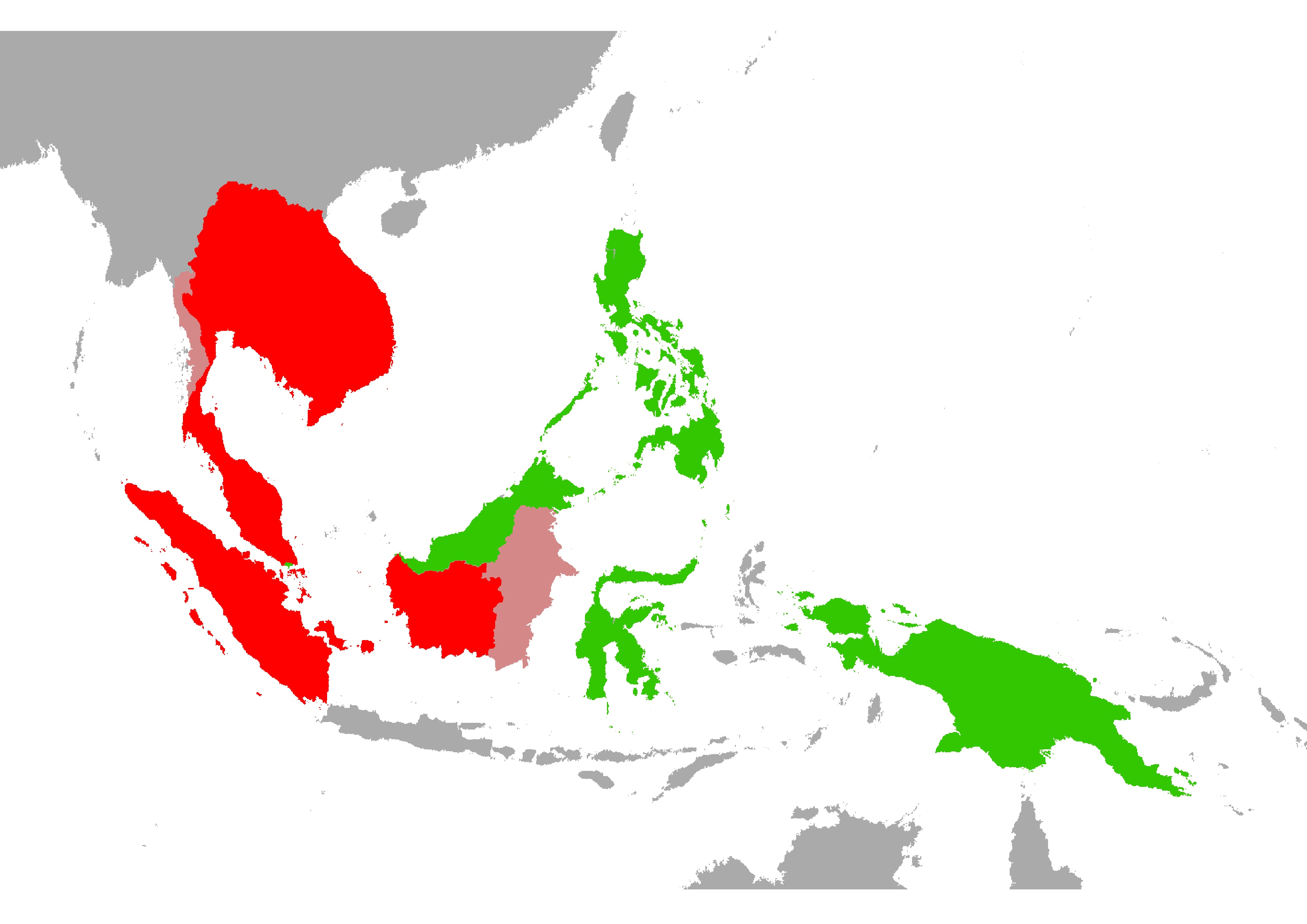
- Red: extant, Light red: possibly extant, Green: introduced

= Kissing gourami =

Species of freshwater fish

Kissing gouramis, also known as kissing fish or kissers (Helostoma temminckii), are medium-sized tropical freshwater fish comprising the monotypic labyrinth fish family Helostomatidae (from the Greek elos [stud, nail], stoma [mouth]). These fish originate from Mainland Southeast Asia, the Greater Sundas and nearby smaller islands, but have also been introduced outside their native range. They are regarded as a food fish and they are sometimes farmed. They are used fresh for steaming, baking, broiling, and pan frying. The kissing gourami is a popular aquarium fish.

== Description ==
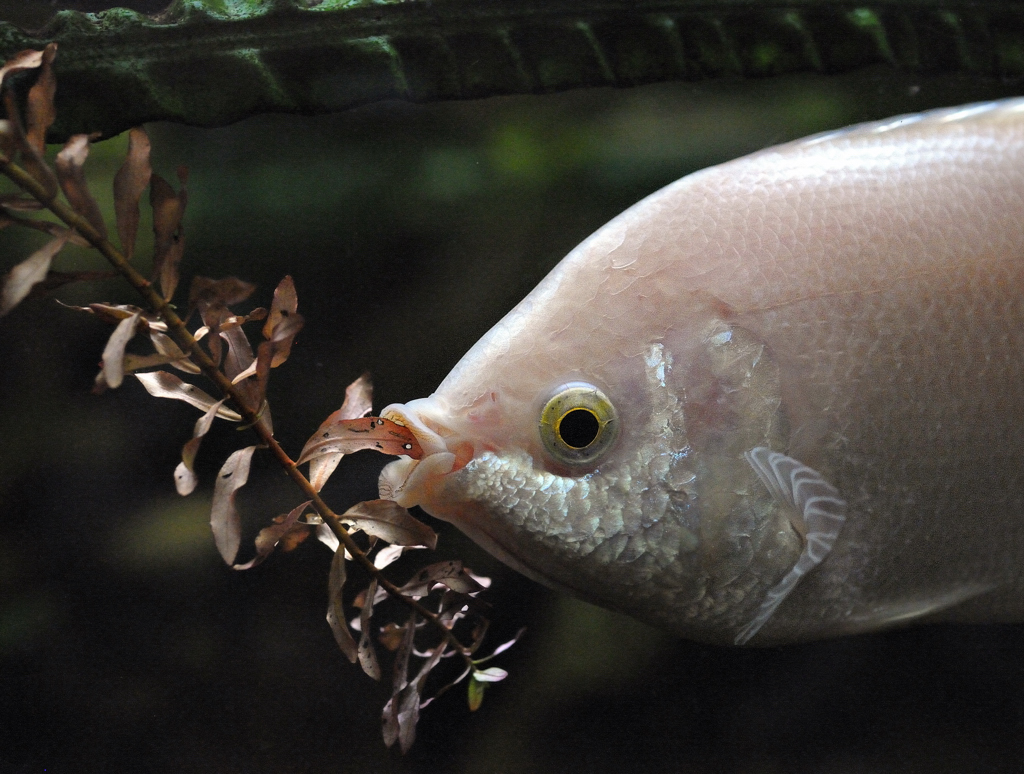
Helostoma temminckii in an aquarium

Typical of gourami, the body is deep and strongly compressed laterally. The long-based dorsal (16–18 spinous rays, 13–16 soft) and anal fins (13–15 spinous rays, 17–19 soft) mirror each other in length and frame the body. The posterior most soft rays of each of these fins are slightly elongated to create a trailing margin. The foremost rays of the jugular pelvic fins are also slightly elongated. The pectoral fins are large, rounded, and low-slung. The caudal fin is rounded to concave. The lateral line is divided in two, with the posterior portion starting below the end of the other; there are a total of 43–48 scales running the line's length.

The most distinctive feature of the kissing gourami is its mouth. Other than being terminal (forward-facing) rather than superior (upward-facing) as in other gourami families, the kissing gourami's mouth is highly protrusible. As its family name suggests, the lips are lined with horny teeth. However, teeth are absent from the premaxilla, dentaries, palatine, and pharynx. The gill rakers are also well-developed and numerous. The visible scales of the body are ctenoid, whereas the scales of the top of the head are cycloid. Kissing gourami reach a maximum of 30 cm (12 in) in total length. There is no outward sexual dimorphism and it is difficult to almost impossible to distinguish the sexes.

Two colour morphs are known: greenish-silvery, which have lengthwise spotty stripes on the body and opaque, dark brown fins; and pink, which have a rose to orangey-pink body and silvery scales with transparent pinkish fins. While it has been claimed that the former fish originate from Thailand and the latter fish originate from Java, the former is the wild form and the latter a leucistic form achieved through selective breeding in captivity.

=== Jaw and mouth ===
The species has an additional joint between its jaw and the rest of the joints, known as intramandibular joint. This type of joint is also present in other species of fish that feed on nutrients attached to the substrate. By increasing the angle of the opening of the jaw, this joint allows kissing gourami access to these nutrients. H. temminckii, however, is the only species known that uses this articulation in this way.

== Habitat and ecology ==
Shallow, slow-moving, and thickly vegetated backwaters are the kissing gourami's natural habitat. They are midwater omnivores that primarily graze on benthic algae and aquatic plants, with insects taken from the surface. They are also filter feeders, using their many gill rakers to supplement their diet with plankton. The fish use their toothed lips to rasp algae from stones and other surfaces. This rasping action, which looks superficially like kissing, is also used by males to challenge the dominancy of conspecifics.

=== Intraspecific behaviour ===
Video of two kissers in an aquarium kissing.

The kissing gourami displays a unique behaviour associated with their characteristic jaw and mouth. Two individuals approach with their jaws fully extended and press their mouths together for a few seconds. This "kissing" behaviour has given H. temminckii the common name of kissing gourami. This is, however, considered to be an intraspecific aggressive behavior, also known as "mouth fighting", due to the contraction of the jaw muscles, and can be understood as a ritualized form of aggression.

=== Ecosystem roles ===
Helostoma temminckii is a host of some parasitic algal species. These algae are able to survive under kissing gourami skin and appear as dark spots. Some hypotheses affirm that these algae communities receive nutrients required for photosynthesis from H. temminckii. Individuals possessing algae parasites in their bodies are commonly found to be less healthy than non-afflicted individuals.

H. temminckii are able to communicate with each other using their complex inner ear. It contains a suprabranchial air-breathing chamber capable of modulating sounds through air bubbles inside of it. Kissing gourami can also make sounds used for communication by moving their teeth.

=== Reproduction ===
Helostoma temminckii are oviparous, dioecious, and mate through external fertilization. Spawning occurs from May to October in Thailand at the beginning of the rainy season. Adults migrate through rivers to shallow lagoons or flooded forests to spawn. Kissing gouramis are open-water egg scatterers; spawning is initiated by the female and takes place under cover of floating vegetation. The female lays an average of 1,000 spherical buoyant eggs, which the adults do not guard. Initial development is rapid; the eggs hatch after one day, and the fry are free-swimming two days thereafter. The kissing gourami does not care for its young. Fish reach sexual maturity at three to five years old.

=== Feeding ===
The kissing gourami is an omnivorous microphagic filtering fish. The mouth, teeth, gills, and intramandibular joint make the kissing gourami well-adapted for scraping nutrients from algae-covered surfaces. Its diet consists of a wide variety of food sources, such as insects, algae, and larvae of other species attached to rocks and substrates.

== In the aquarium ==
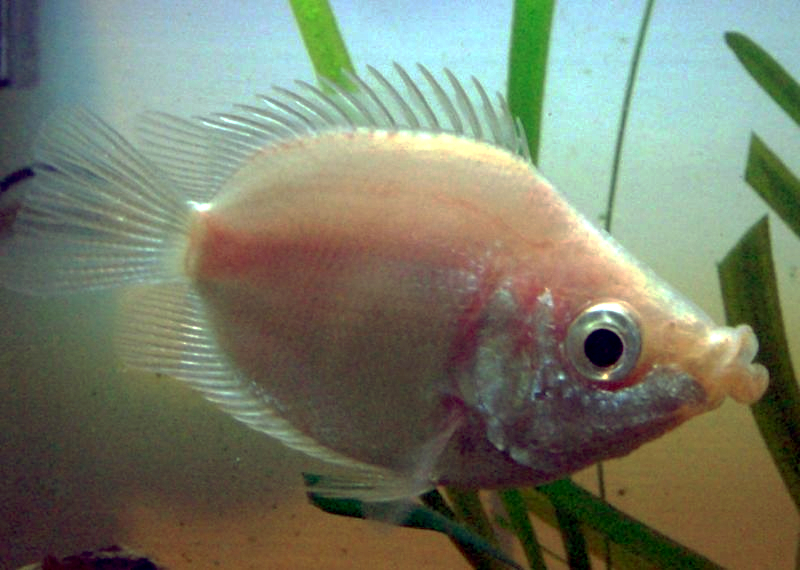
A "balloon" morph kissing gourami. The body length is shortened compared to a natural kissing gourami.

Kissing gourami are popular with aquarists for the fish's peculiar "kissing" behavior. Fish of both sexes will often spar by meeting mouths and pushing each other through the water. Large quantities of these fish are exported to Japan, Europe, North America, Australia, and other parts of the world for the aquarium trade. Juvenile fish will quickly outgrow smaller aquaria and need a roomy tank to thrive. Kissing gourami are territorial and often bully, chase, or torment other fish of similar size, causing significant stress on tank mates. While the "kissing" behavior itself is never fatal, constant bullying can stress other fish to death. Kissing gourami are capable of killing other fish by sucking the mucus off their skin as food, which opens the victim fish up to infections. These fish may be useful as algae eaters to control algae growth. To prevent digging and to present enough surface area for algae growth, the substrate should consist of large-diameter gravel and stones. The aquarium's back glass should not be cleaned during regular maintenance, as the gouramis will feed on the algae grown there. Most plants will not survive the fish's grazing, so inedible plants such as Java fern, Java moss, or plastic plants are recommended.

These fish are omnivorous and need both plant and animal matter in their diets. The fish will accept vegetables such as cooked lettuce and any kind of live food. Water hardness should be between 5 and 30 dGH and pH between 6.8 and 8.5; the temperature should be between 22 and 28 °C (72 and 82 °F). When breeding kissing gouramis, soft water is preferred. As the fish do not build nests, lettuce leaves placed on the water surface serve as a spawning medium. The lettuce will eventually host bacteria and infusoria upon which the fish will feed. The maximum length for kissing gouramis in aquariums is between 30 and 40 cm (12 and 15.5 in). Kissing Gourami are also a very long lived fish, a long-term commitment for the fish keeper. They have been known to live in excess of 25 years (*).

In the aquarium, breeders have also produced a "dwarf" or "balloon pink" variety, which is a mutated strain of the pink gourami that are offered to hobbyists. The "balloons" are named so for their smaller and rounder bodies.

=== Lifespan ===
In captivity and in the wild the average lifespan is 5 to 7 years, but it is known that kissing gourami can live much longer.

== See also ==
- List of fish families
