= Laubuka varuna =

Conservation status
- Endangered (IUCN 3.1)

Scientific classification
- Kingdom: Animalia
- Phylum: Chordata
- Class: Actinopterygii
- Order: Cypriniformes
- Family: Danionidae
- Subfamily: Danioninae
- Genus: Laubuka
- Species: L. varuna

Binomial name
- Laubuka varuna Pethiyagoda, Kottelat, Silva, Maduwage & Meegaskumbura, 2008

Synonyms
- Laubuca varuna Pethiyagoda, Kottelat, Silva, Maduwage & Meegaskumbura, 2008; Laubuka ruhuna Pethiyagoda, Kottelat, Silva, Maduwage & Meegaskumbura, 2008

Species of fish

Laubuka varuna is a species of freshwater ray-finned fish belonging to family Danionidae. It is endemic to Sri Lanka.

== Etymology ==
The specific name varuna is from Sinhala language meaning "western of the island" of Sri Lanka, confirming that the presence of this freshwater fish to western parts of the country.

== Description ==
It can grow to 5.5 cm (2.2 in) standard length.
