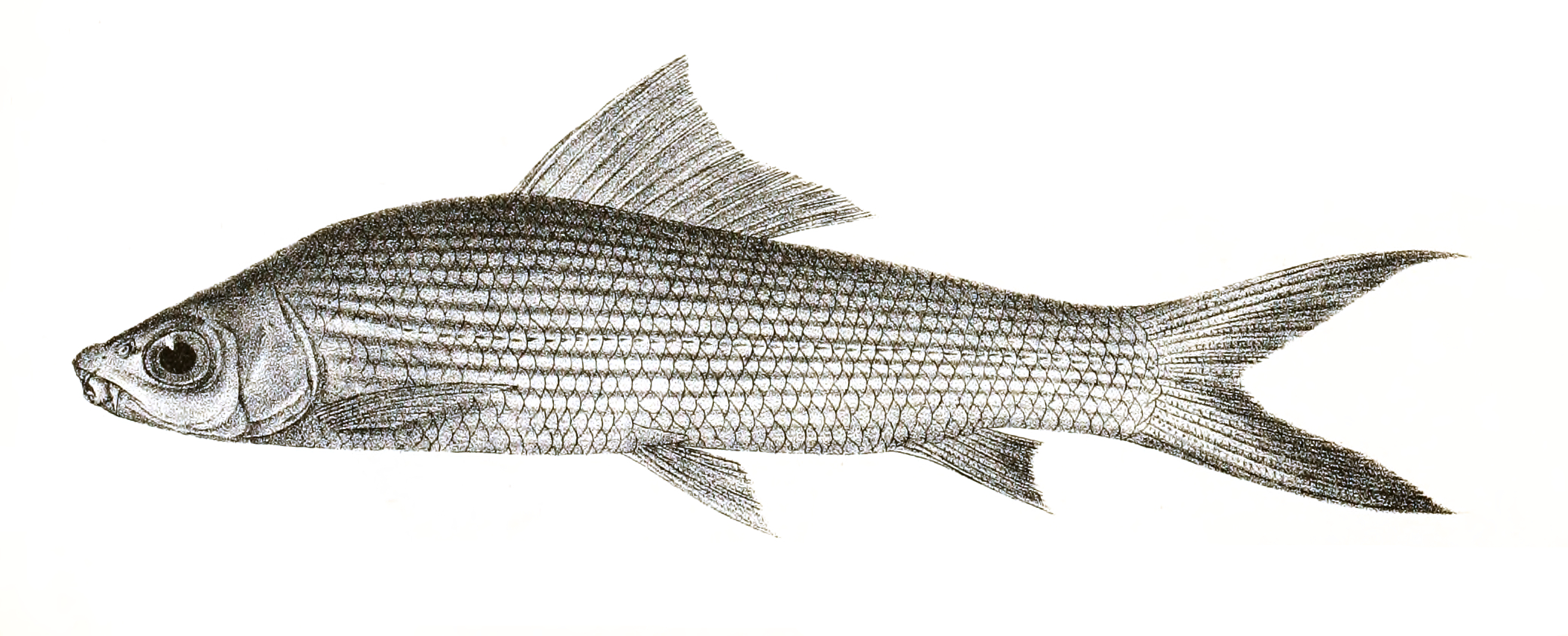

Conservation status
- Least Concern (IUCN 3.1)

Scientific classification
- Domain: Eukaryota
- Kingdom: Animalia
- Phylum: Chordata
- Class: Actinopterygii
- Order: Cypriniformes
- Family: Cyprinidae
- Subfamily: Labeoninae
- Genus: Labeo
- Species: L. dussumieri

Binomial name
- Labeo dussumieri (Valenciennes, 1842)

Synonyms
- Rohita dussumieri Valenciennes, 1842; Cirrhinus dussumieri (Valenciennes, 1842); Rohita rouxii Valenciennes, 1842; Cirrhinus rouxii (Valenciennes, 1842); Labeo rouxii (Valenciennes, 1842)

= Labeo dussumieri =

Species of fish

Labeo dussumieri (Malabar Labeo) is fish in genus Labeo known to occur in west-flowing rivers of the Western Ghats. Earlier Sri Lankan population was considered as the same species as L. dussumieri, recent phylogenetic and physiological differences suggest that Sri Lankan population is a distinct species, Labeo heladiva..

Named in honor of Jean-Jacques Dussumier (1792-1883), French voyager and merchant, whose account of this species is the basis of Valenciennes’ description.
