= Redneck goby =

Conservation status
- Least Concern (IUCN 3.1)

Scientific classification
- Kingdom: Animalia
- Phylum: Chordata
- Class: Actinopterygii
- Order: Gobiiformes
- Family: Oxudercidae
- Genus: Schismatogobius
- Species: S. deraniyagalai

Binomial name
- Schismatogobius deraniyagalai Kottelat & Pethiyagoda, 1989

Species of fish

Schismatogobius deraniyagalai, the redneck goby, is a species of goby native to India and Sri Lanka. This species inhabits river shallows, where it prefers areas with substrates that range from sand to gravel in which it can hide when threatened. This species can reach a total length of 4.5 cm (1.8 in). It can also be found in the aquarium trade. The specific name honours the Sri Lankan paleontologist and zoologist Paul E. P. Deraniyagala (1900-1976) for his contribution to the natural history of Sri Lanka.
