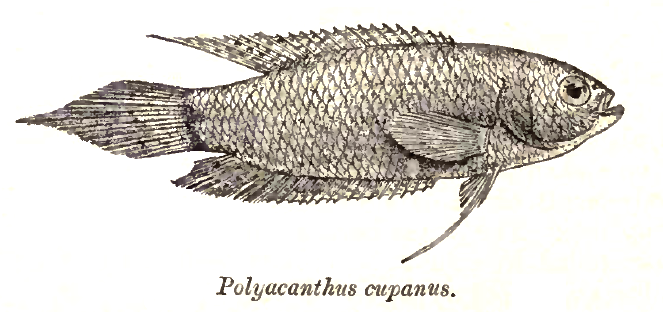

Conservation status
- Least Concern (IUCN 3.1)

Scientific classification
- Kingdom: Animalia
- Phylum: Chordata
- Class: Actinopterygii
- Division: Teleostei
- Order: Anabantiformes
- Family: Osphronemidae
- Genus: Pseudosphromenus
- Species: P. cupanus

Binomial name
- Pseudosphromenus cupanus (G. Cuvier, 1831)
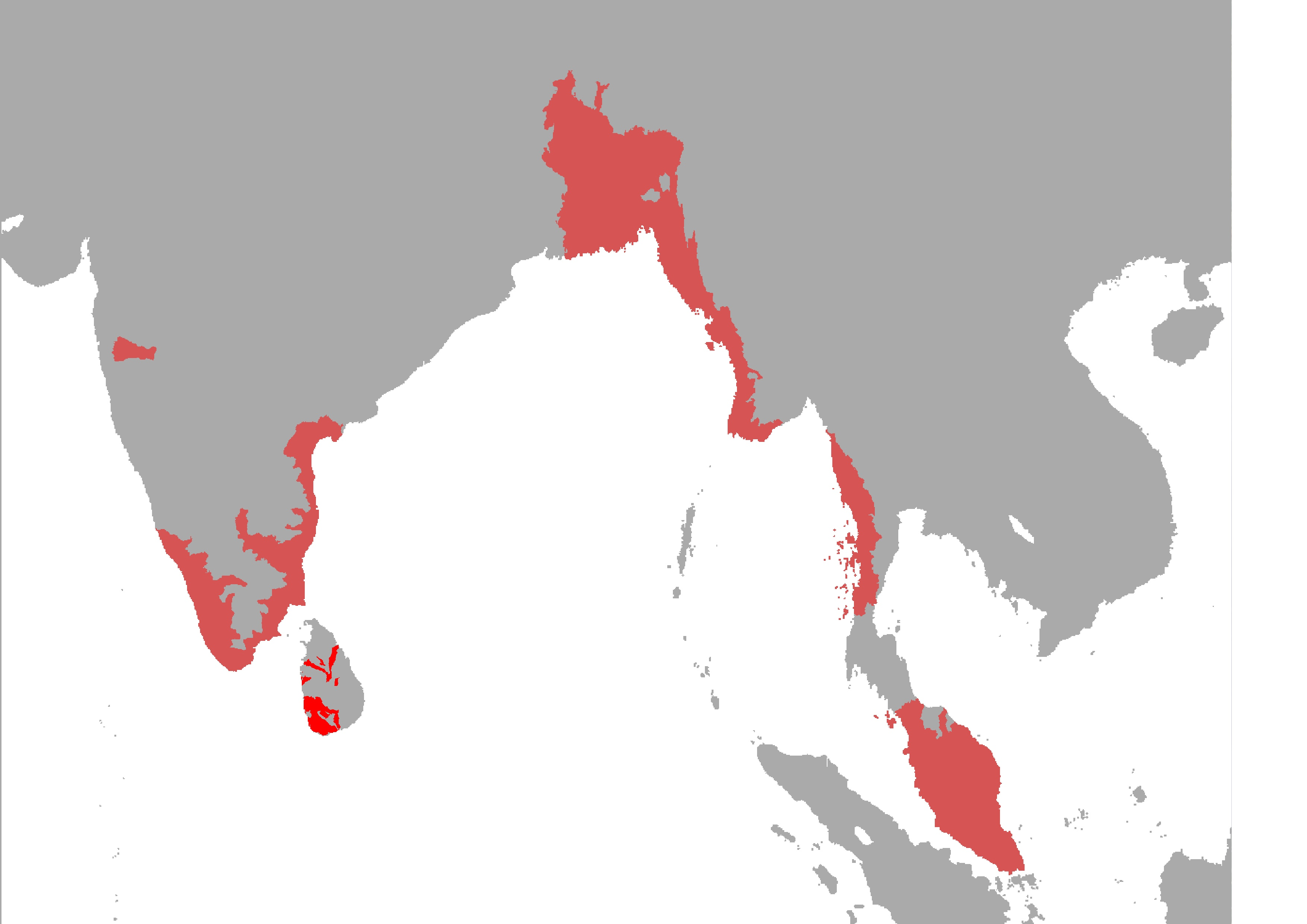

Synonyms
- Macropodus cupanus Cuvier, 1831; Polyacanthus cupanus Cuvier, 1831

= Pseudosphromenus cupanus =

Species of fish

Pseudosphromenus cupanus, also known as the spiketail paradisefish or Spiketail betta fish, is a species of medium-small gouramies native to southern India and Sri Lanka. This species is often found in shallow, slow-moving or stagnant water, such as ditches and paddy fields. P. cupanus eats insects and zooplankton. Males are known to gather eggs in its mouth, and to guard the nest after eggs are hatched. The male may build many nests, and periodically move the eggs between them.
