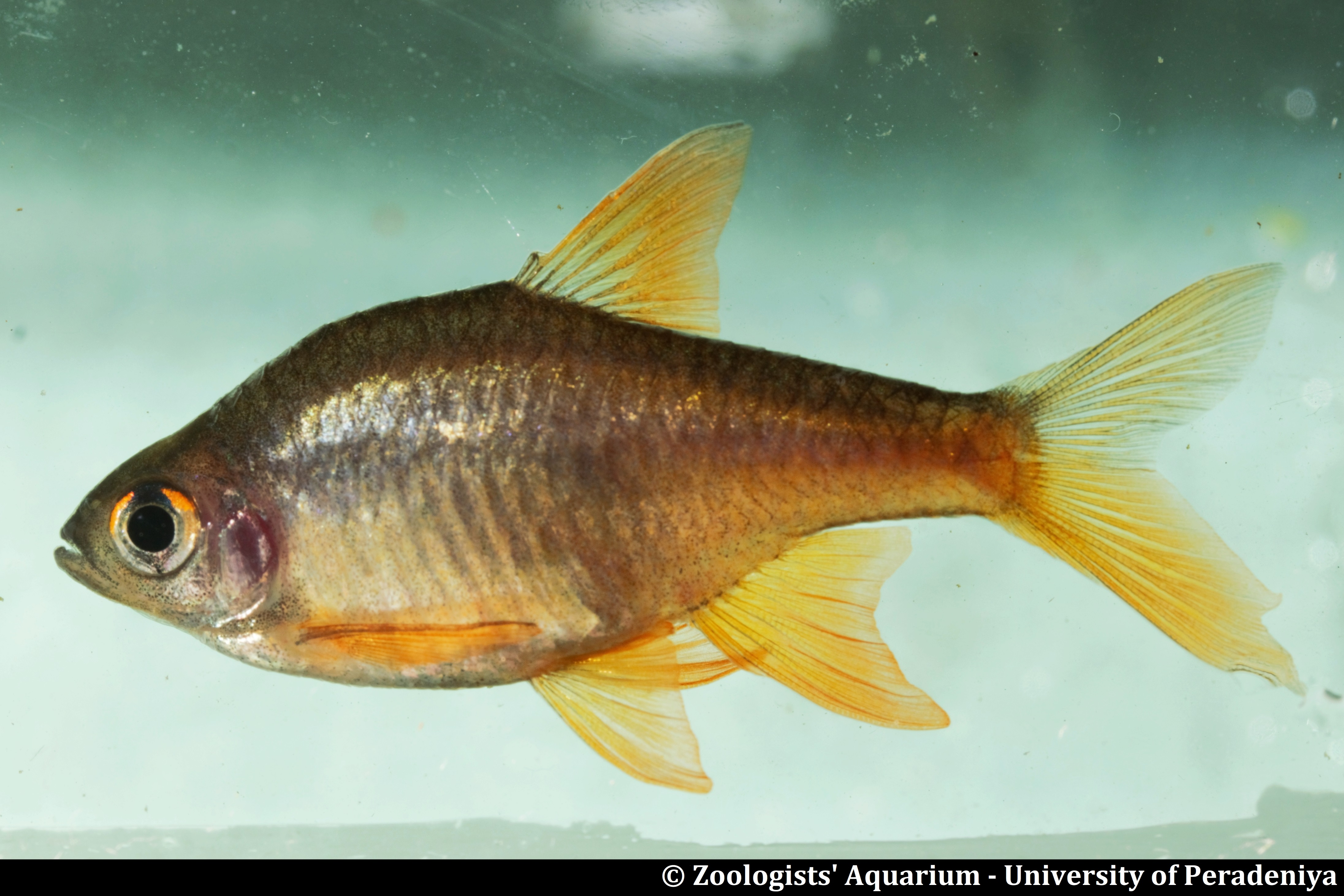
- Individual from Ambagamuwa, Sri Lanka

Conservation status
- Endangered (IUCN 3.1)

Scientific classification
- Kingdom: Animalia
- Phylum: Chordata
- Class: Actinopterygii
- Order: Cypriniformes
- Family: Danionidae
- Subfamily: Rasborinae
- Genus: Rasboroides
- Species: R. pallidus

Binomial name
- Rasboroides pallidus (Deraniyagala, 1930)

Synonyms
- Rasbora vaterifloris pallida Deraniyagala, 1958; Rasboroides rohani Batuwita, M. de Silva & Edirisinghe, 2013

= Rasboroides pallidus =

Species of fish

Rasboroides pallidus is a species of freshwater cyprinid fish endemic to southwestern Sri Lanka. It is only known from shallow, slow-flowing streams in the basins of the Kalu River, Bentara River, Gin River, Polathu-Modera River and Nilwala River. It has been introduced to the Mahaweli and Walawe River basins, and is overall less threatened than the related R. vaterifloris.

A comprehensive taxonomic review in 2018 based on morphometry, meristics and mtDNA disputed the validity of R. rohani, showing that it is a junior synonym of R. pallidus; this synonymy is followed by the Catalog of Fishes but not the FishBase.

It can grow to 3.6 cm (1.4 in) standard length.
