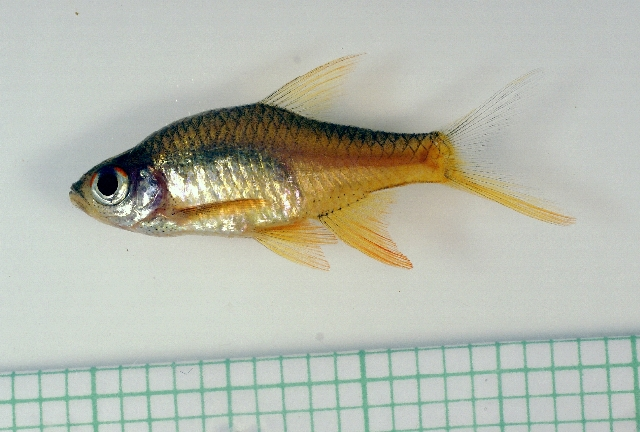

Conservation status
- Endangered (IUCN 3.1)

Scientific classification
- Kingdom: Animalia
- Phylum: Chordata
- Class: Actinopterygii
- Order: Cypriniformes
- Family: Danionidae
- Subfamily: Rasborinae
- Genus: Rasboroides
- Species: R. vaterifloris

Binomial name
- Rasboroides vaterifloris (Deraniyagala, 1930)

Synonyms
- Rasbora vaterifloris Deraniyagala, 1930; Rasbora vaterifloris ruber Deraniyagala, 1958; Rasbora vaterifloris typica Deraniyagala, 1958; Rasbora vaterifloris rubioculis Deraniyagala, 1958; Rasbora nigromarginata Meinken, 1957

= Rasboroides vaterifloris =

Species of fish

Rasboroides vaterifloris, known as the pearly rasbora, vateria flower rasbora or fire rasbora, is a species of freshwater cyprinid fish endemic to Sri Lanka. It can be found in the shallow waters of shaded, slow-flowing clear streams with a silt substrate. It also prefers areas with plentiful leaf debris. Its diet consists of detritus and terrestrial insects. This species can reach a length of 4 centimetres (1.6 in) TL. It can also be found in the aquarium trade.

R. vaterifloris was formerly believed to be the only species in the genus and found in several river basins. A study in 2013 found that it was restricted to the Kalu River basin, with related species inhabiting other basins. However, a comprehensive taxonomic review in 2018 based on morphometry, meristics and mtDNA found that one of the species recognized in 2013, R. nigromarginatus (also restricted to the Kalu River basin), is a junior synonym of R. vaterifloris. Although this expands its range in the Kalu River basin, R. vaterifloris is more threatened than the relatively widespread R. pallidus.
