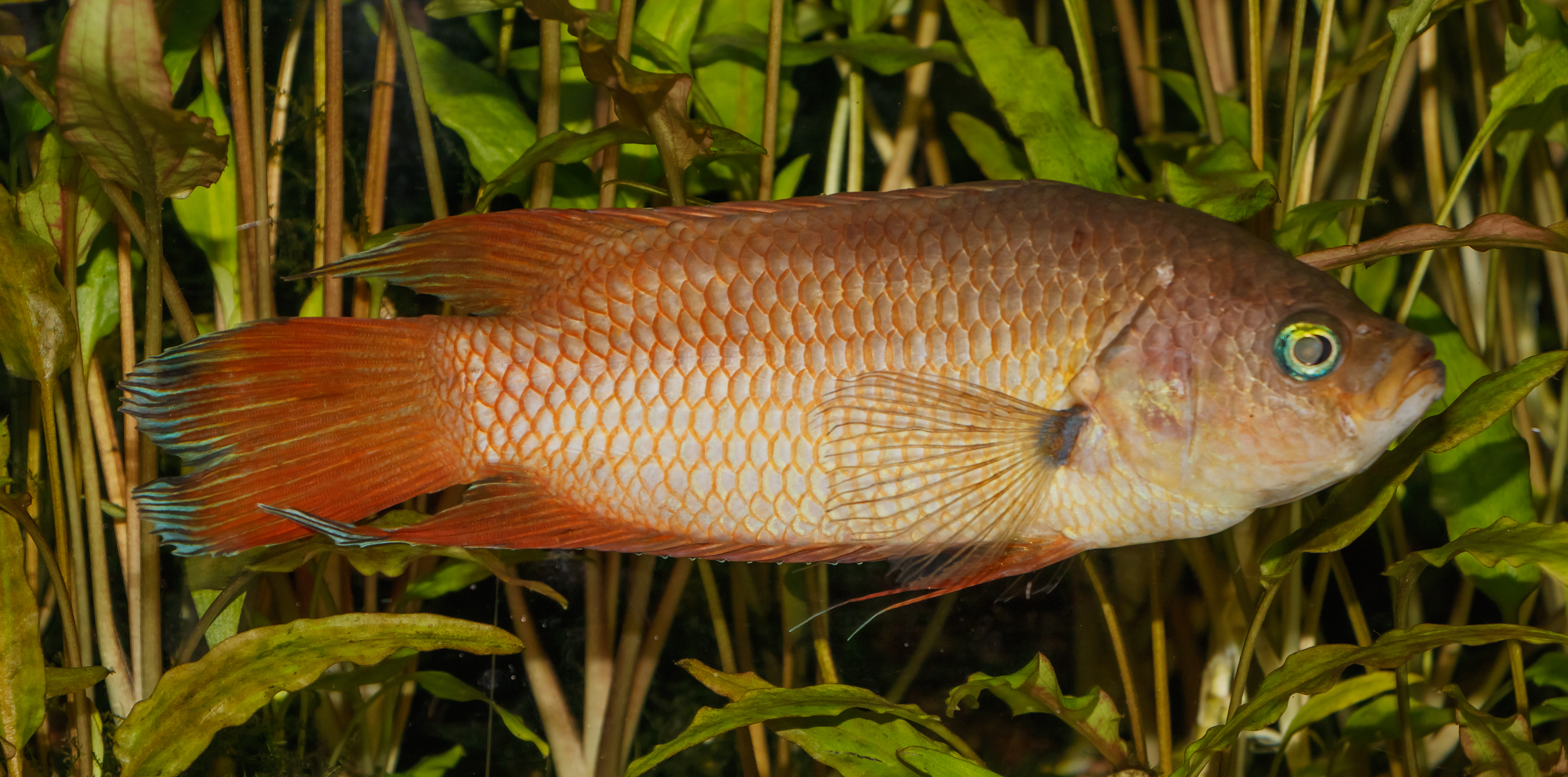

Conservation status
- Vulnerable (IUCN 3.1)

Scientific classification
- Kingdom: Animalia
- Phylum: Chordata
- Class: Actinopterygii
- Order: Anabantiformes
- Family: Osphronemidae
- Genus: Belontia
- Species: B. signata

Binomial name
- Belontia signata (Günther, 1861)
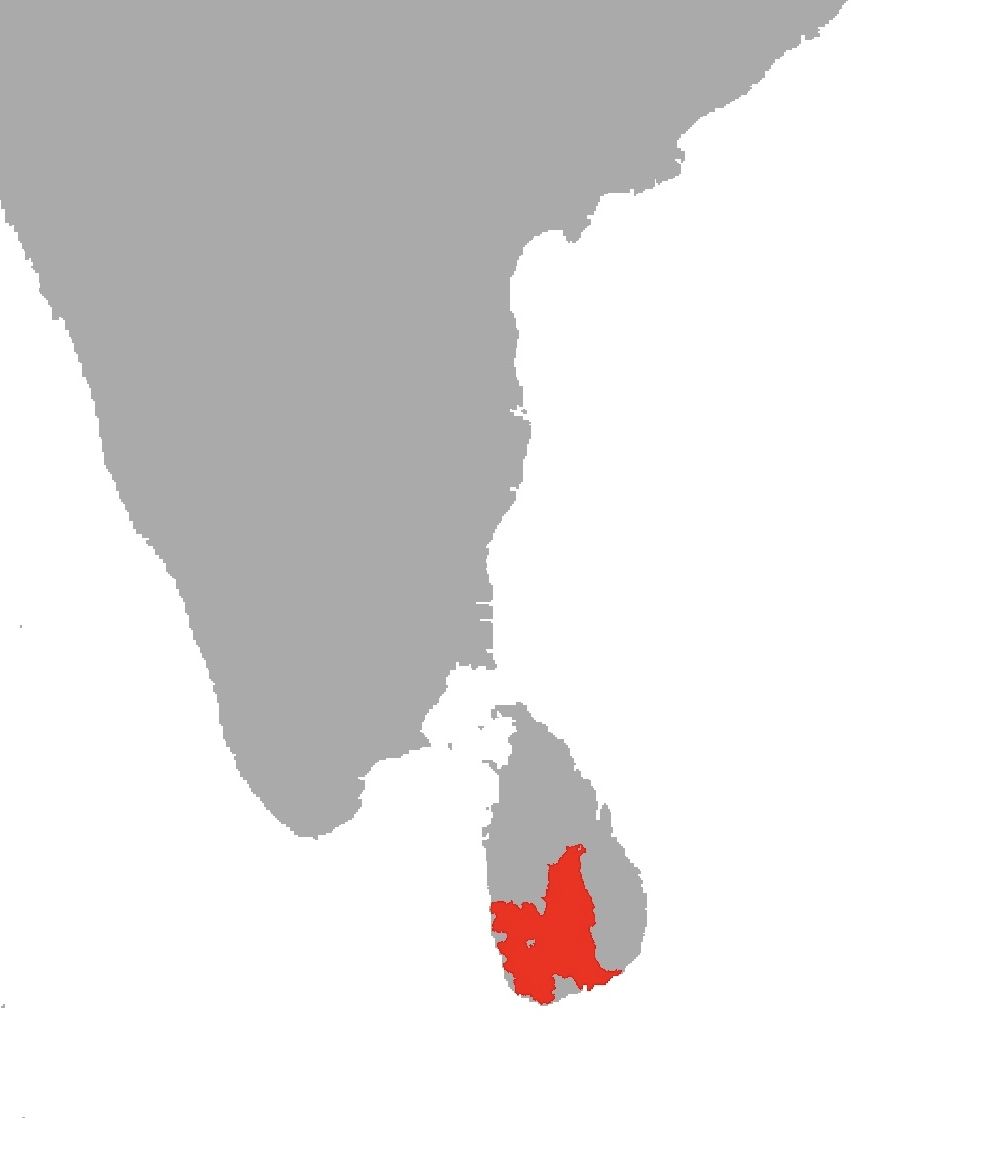
- Red: extant, Light red: possibly extant

Synonyms
- Polyacanthus signatus Günther, 1861; Macropodus signatus (Günther, 1861)

= Belontia signata =

Species of fish

Belontia signata, the Ceylonese combtail, is a species of gourami endemic to Sri Lanka. This species inhabits shallow, slow-flowing clear-water streams. It can reach a length of 18 centimetres (7.1 in) TL though most are only around 10 centimetres (3.9 in). It is also found in the aquarium trade. The combtail, in addition to normal gills, has a labyrinth, or rudimentary lung-like organ which enables it to survive in poorly oxygenated water, or even out of water, for considerable periods of time. Combtails can often be observed taking air from the surface of their tank to replenish their labyrinth.

== Fishkeeping ==
While the combtail (or combtail gourami) is sometimes found in fish shops, it does not make a good pet unless kept by itself. In a community tank it will bully other fish, and may injure or kill them. They will eat almost any food presented to them including maggots, bloodworms, flake, pellet, and vegetable foods.
