= Rasbora armitagei =

Conservation status
- Critically Endangered (IUCN 3.1)

Scientific classification
- Kingdom: Animalia
- Phylum: Chordata
- Class: Actinopterygii
- Order: Cypriniformes
- Family: Danionidae
- Subfamily: Rasborinae
- Genus: Rasbora
- Species: R. armitagei

Binomial name
- Rasbora armitagei Silva, Maduwage & Pethiyagoda, 2010

Species of fish

Rasbora armitagei, also known as Armitage's rasbora or Armitage's striped rasbora, is a minnow endemic to Sri Lanka. The fish was discovered from a small tributary of Kalu Ganga at Rakwana, South-Western Wet zone, Sri Lanka. This species is named after naturalist David Armitage. (Note: Hence, the common names should logically be "Armitage's ...", the "-i" in the specific name being a suffix used to indicate patronymy.)

== Description ==
Rasbora armitagei can grow to 6.2 cm (2.4 in) standard length.

== Habitat ==
Rasbora armitagei is known from shady, slow-flowing clear water streams with gravel and boulder substrata.

== Etymology ==
Rasbora armitagei honours the British civil servant and hobby aquarist David Armitage in its specific name.

== See also ==
- Rasbora naggsi
