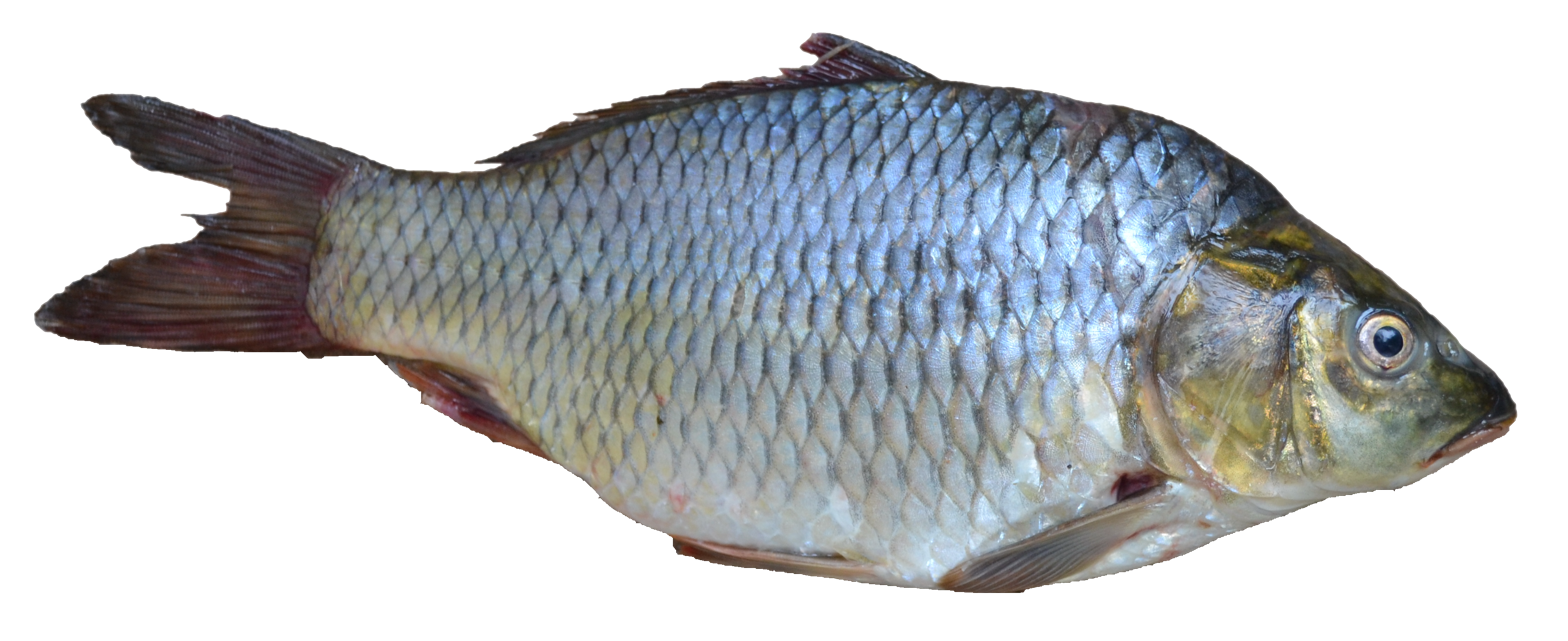

Conservation status
- Least Concern (IUCN 3.1)

Scientific classification
- Kingdom: Animalia
- Phylum: Chordata
- Class: Actinopterygii
- Order: Cypriniformes
- Family: Cyprinidae
- Subfamily: Smiliogastrinae
- Genus: Systomus
- Species: S. sarana

Binomial name
- Systomus sarana (F. Hamilton, 1822)

Synonyms
- Cyprinus sarana Hamilton, 1822; Barbodes sarana Hamilton, 1822; Barbodes sarana sarana Hamilton, 1822; Barbus sarana Hamilton, 1822; Puntius sarana Hamilton, 1822; Puntius sarana sarana Hamilton, 1822; Barbus diliciosus McClelland, 1839; Barbus polydori Valenciennes, 1842; Barbus roseipinnis Valenciennes, 1842; Puntius roseipinnis Valenciennes, 1842; Barbus kakus Valenciennes, 1842; Barbus gardonides Valenciennes, 1842; Barbus duvaucelii Valenciennes, 1842; Barbus russellii Günther, 1868; Barbus binduchitra Hora, 1937; Puntius saberi Datta & Karmakar, 1981

= Olive barb =

Species of fish

The olive barb (Systomus sarana) is a species of cyprinid fish native to Afghanistan, India, Nepal, Bangladesh, Pakistan, Bhutan, Sri Lanka, Thailand and Myanmar. This species can reach a length of 42 centimetres (17 in) TL. It is of minor importance to local commercial fisheries and sought as a gamefish. It is popular in Bangladesh but unpopular in the aquarium trade. Adults occur in rivers, streams, lakes and backwaters. Tolerant of salinity. They form schools in groups of four or five to several dozens. Feed on aquatic insects, fish, algae and shrimps. Spawn in running waters among submerged boulders and vegetation. Small fish have limited demand in the aquarium trade.
