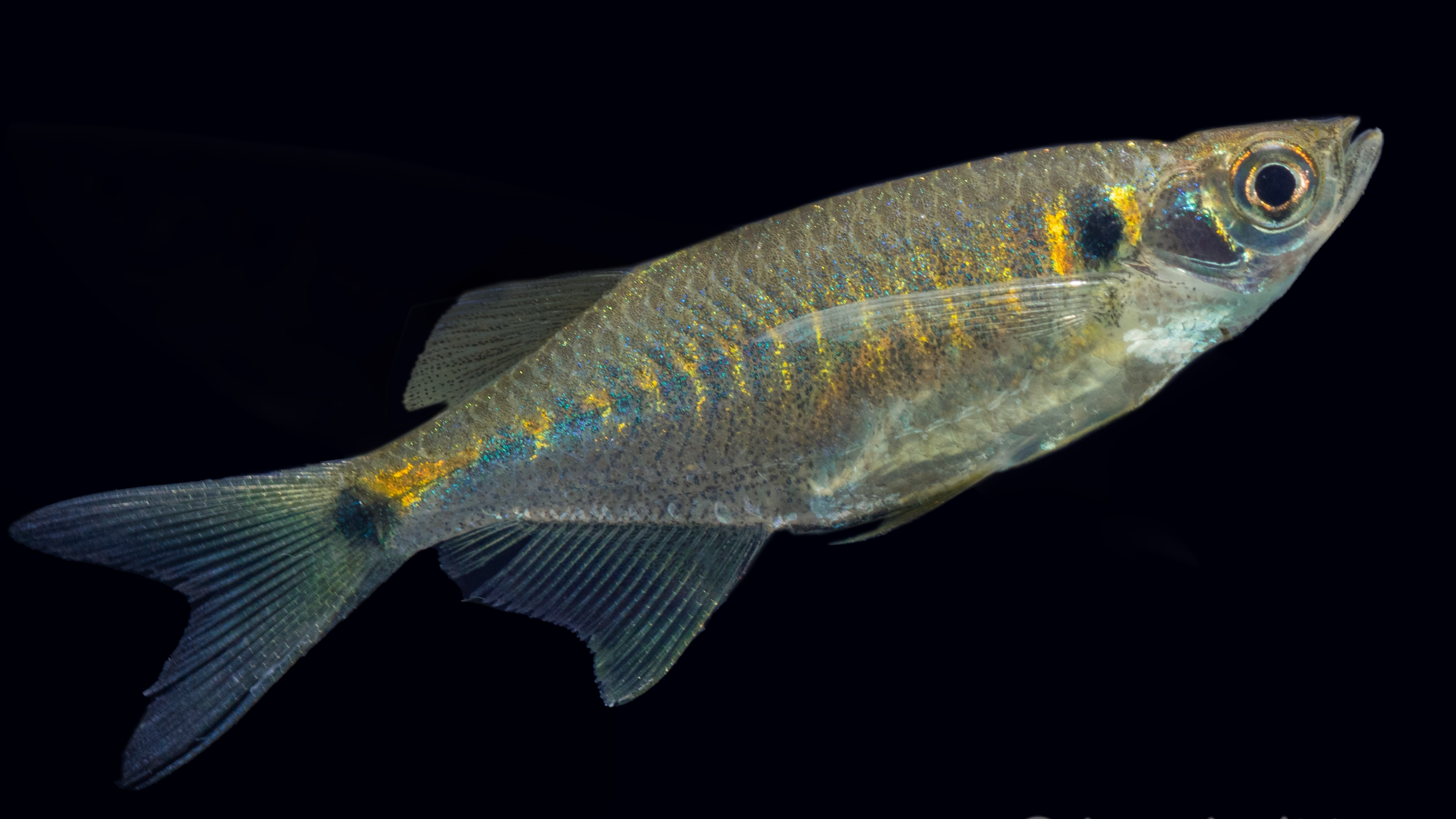

Conservation status
- Least Concern (IUCN 3.1)

Scientific classification
- Kingdom: Animalia
- Phylum: Chordata
- Class: Actinopterygii
- Division: Teleostei
- Order: Cypriniformes
- Family: Danionidae
- Genus: Laubuka
- Species: L. laubuca

Binomial name
- Laubuka laubuca (F. Hamilton, 1822)

Synonyms
- List: Cyprinus laubuca Hamilton, 1822; Chela laubuca (Hamilton, 1822); Leuciscus laubuca (Hamilton, 1822); Perilampus laubuca (Hamilton, 1822); Perilampus guttatus McClelland, 1839; Laubuca guttatus (McClelland, 1839); Perilampus fulvescens Blyth, 1860; Clupea huae Tirant, 1883; Chela huae (Tirant, 1883); Danio menoni Barman, 1986; Laubuka brahmaputraensis Kulabtong, Suksri & Nonpayom, 2012

= Indian glass barb =

Species of fish

The Indian glass barb (Laubuka laubuca) is a species of Danionid fish in the family Danionidae found in Pakistan, India, Bangladesh, Sri Lanka, Myanmar, Nepal, and Indonesia. It has also been reported from the Mekong and Chao Phraya.
