= List of danionin species =

In the last few decades, many danionin species have been moved into different genera, in some cases repeatedly; similarly, some species have been synonymised with other species and even in some cases later unsynonymised, all of which has caused confusion. With a large number of recent discoveries, particularly in Myanmar in recent years, confusion has been caused. As a result, a separate page has been created which lists all danionin species and also lists defunct species which have since been synonymised or renamed. Individual danionin species are listed below in order of genus:

== Species categorised by genus ==
=== Danio ===
The species remaining in the genus Danio comprise most of the danionins familiar to aquarists. They have two pairs of long barbels and are generally characterised by horizontal stripes (with the exception of the Panther Danio, Glowlight Danio and Black Barred Danio which have vertical bars. In size they range from 4 cm/ 1.75 in) to 15 cm/ 6 in).

Frequently used common names are given for reference, but if the common name does not appear, click on it on the section above for more details.

- Danio albolineatus - Pearl Danio
- Danio abolineatus var pulcher - Blue-Redstripe Danio
- Danio abolineatus var tweediei - Kedah Danio
- Danio choprai - Glowlight Danio
- Danio dangila - Moustached danio
- Danio dichromatus
- Danio feegradei - Yoma Danio
- Danio kerri - Blue Danio
- Danio kyathit var spotted - Ocelot Danio
- Danio kyathit var striped - Orange Finned Zebra Danio
- Celestichthys margaritatus - Celestial Pearl Danio formerly known as Galaxy Rasbora
- Danio meghalayensis - Meghalaya Danio -
- Danio nigrofasciatus - Spotted Danio -
- Danio quangbinhensis
- Danio roseus - Rose Danio -
- Danio rerio - Zebra danio
- Danio rerio var frankei - Leopard Danio
- Danio sp aff kyathit - Redfin Danio
- Danio sp "KP01" - Burma Zebra Danio
- Danio sp "TW01" - Black Barred Danio
- Danio sp "TW02" - Burma Danio
- Danio sp "TW03" - Panther Danio

=== Devario ===
The Devario species comprise some danionins familiar to aquarists. Generally larger fish than Danios, they have short barbels (if present at all) and generally have deeper bodies than Danio, with species having vertical stripes present (as well as horizontal). In size, they range from 5 to 15 cm (2 to 6 in).

- Devario acuticephala
- Devario aequipinnatus - Giant Danio
- Devario affinis - False Giant Danio
- Devario apogon
- Devario assamensis - Red Mirik Danio
- Devario annandalei - Annandale's Giant Danio
- Devario browni - Browns Danio
- Devario chrysotaeniatus Gold Striped Danio
- Devario devario - Bengal Danio or Sind Danio
- Devario interruptus
- Devario maetaengensis - Fire Bar Danio
- Devario laoensis - Laos Giant Danio
- Devario malabaricus - Malabar Danio
- Devario pathirana - Barred Danio
- Devario regina - Queen Danio
- Devario shanensis - Shan Danio
- Devario sondhii - Sondhi's Danio
- Devario strigillifer
- Devario sp "Broken Line" - Blue Moon Danio

=== Little-known Devario species ===
Little is known about the following Devario species, but some information exists about them at the Fishbase Devario index(Fishbase: Ed. Rainer Froese and Daniel Pauly. July 2005 version)

- Devario acrostomus
- Devario apopyris
- Devario fangfangae
- Devario fraseri - Fraser's Danio
- Devario gibber
- Devario horai
- Devario kakhienensis - Kakhyen Hills Danio
- Devario leptos
- Devario manipurensis
- Devario naganensis - Naga Hills Danio
- Devario neilgherriensis - Neilgherry Hills Giant Danio
- Devario peninsulae
- Devario salmonata
- Devario spinosus
- Devario suvatti
- Devario yuensis

=== Tanichthys ===
Not strictly speaking a danionin genus, Tanichthys is widely regarded as one.

- Tanichthys albonubes - White Cloud Mountain Minnow
- Tanichthys micagemmae - Vietnamese Cardinal Minnow

=== Esomus ===
A genus comprising the flying barbs, Esomus species are closely related to the genus Danio and are distinctive for their extremely long barbels.

- Esomus ahli
- Esomus altus
- Esomus barbatus - South Indian Flying Barb
- Esomus caudiocellatus
- Esomus danricus - Indian Flying Barb
- Esomus lineatus - Striped Flying Barb
- Esomus longimanus - Mekong Flying Barb
- Esomus malabaricus
- Esomus malayensis - Malayan Flying Barb
- Esomus manipurensis
- Esomus metallicus - Striped Flying Barb
- Esomus thermoicos

=== Chela ===
Chela is a closely related genus to Devario

- Chela cachius - Neon Hatchet Fish
- Chela caeruleostigmata - Leaping Barb
- Chela dadiburjori - Dadio
- Chela fasciata
- Chela laubuca - Indian Glass Barb
- Chela maassi

=== Parachela ===
Parachela is closely related to Chela and Devario

- Parachela cyanea
- Parachela hypophthalmus
- Parachela ingerkongi
- Parachela maculicauda
- Parachela oxygastroides - Glass Fish
- Parachela siamensis
- Parachela williaminae

=== Inlecypris ===
A genus closely related to Devario, Inlecypris comprises two smallish barred fish from Lake Inle in Myanmar.

- Inlecypris jayarami
- Inlecypris auropurpurea

=== "Miniature" danionins ===
The following genera of tiny fish are thought to be danionins closely related to Danio and Esomus, but too little is known about them to confirm this.

==== Danionella ====
Danionella comprises tiny, recently discovered fish.

- Danionella mirifica
- Danionella translucida

"Several other as yet unnamed Danionella species have very recently been discovered".

==== Microrasbora ====
The genus name Microrasbora means "small Rasbora", but these fish appear to be more closely related to the Danio species than Rasbora. Speculation exists that Microrasbora erythromicron may be transferred to the genus Danio, but this now seems unlikely.

- Microrasbora erythromicron
- Microrasbora gatesi
- Microrasbora kubotai
- Microrasbora nana
- Microrasbora rubescens

==== Paedocypris ====
Paedocypris contains the smallest known fish in the world.

- Paedocypris micromegethes
- Paedocypris progenetica

==== Sundadanio ====
A genus with only one species, the genus Sundadanio was created after Rasbora axelrodi species was transferred to this genus. S. axelrodi resembles a tiny Rasbora.

- Sundadanio axelrodi

== Danionins renamed or wrongly identified ==
These genera that previously described certain danionins are no longer valid:

- Allodanio
- Brachydanio
- Danioides
- Daniops
- Eustira
- Parabarilius
- Paradanio
- Rambaibarnia

All Devario species were formerly in the genus Danio. In addition, Devario acuticephala, Devario shanensis, and Devario sondhii were also regarded at one time as being in the former genus Brachydanio. Certain fish were formerly described within danionin genera and subsequently moved to their correct genus. Where such fish were moved to the genus: Achielognargus, Acanthorhodeus, Barilius, Opsarius, Oxygaster, Paralaubuca, Rhodeus, Salmostoma, and Securicula, such fish are not now deemed to be danionins.

- Allodanio ponticulus, now renamed Barilius ponticulus
- Aphyocypris pooni, 'Garnet', now deemed a synonym of Tanichthys albonubes (White Cloud Mountain Minnow)
- Brachydanio acuticephala, now renamed Devario acuticephala
- Brachydanio albolineatus, now renamed Danio albolineatus (Pearl Danio)
- Brachydanio choprae, now renamed Danio choprai (Glowlight Danio)
- Brachydanio frankei, now deemed a subspecies of Danio rerio (Danio rerio var frankei)
- Brachydanio jayarami, now renamed Inlecypris jayarami
- Brachydanio kerri, now renamed Danio kerri (Blue danio)
- Brachydanio nigrofasciatus, now renamed Danio nigrofasciatus (Spotted Danio),
- Brachydanio pulcher, now deemed a subspecies of Danio albolineatus (Danio abolineatus var pulcher)
- Brachydanio rerio, now renamed Danio rerio (Zebra Danio),
- Brachydanio shanensis, now renamed Devario shanensis
- Brachydanio sondhii, now renamed Devario sondhii
- Brachydanio tweediei, now deemed a subspecies of Danio albolineatus (Danio abolineatus var tweediei)
- Danio aeqipinnulus, now deemed a synonym of Devario aequipinnatus (Giant Danio)
- Danio albolineata, now deemed a synonym of Danio albolineatus (Pearl Danio)
- Danio analipunctatus, now deemed a synonym of Danio nigrofasciatus (Spotted Danio)
- Danio deyi, now deemed a synonym of Danio dangila (Moustached Danio)
- Danio interrupta, now deemed a synonym of Devario interruptus
- Danio jayarami, now renamed Inlecypris jayarami
- Danio lineatus, now deemed a synonym of Danio rerio (Zebra Danio)
- Danio lineolatus, now deemed a synonym of Devario aequipinnatus (Giant Danio)
- Danio menglaensis, now renamed Opsarius koratensis
- Danio menoni, now renamed Chela laubuca
- Danio micronema, now deemed a synonym of Devario malabaricus (Malabar Danio)
- Danio monshiensis, now renamed Barilius monshiensis,
- Danio ponticulus, now renamed Barilius ponticulus
- Danio rheinarddti, now renamed Rhodeus rheinardti
- Danio salmonatus, now deemed a synonym of Devario salmonata
- Danio stoliczae, now deemed a synonym of Danio albolineatus (Pearl Danio)
- Daniops myersi, now renamed Devario laoensis
- Devario chankaeinsis, Khanka Spiny Bitterling, now renamed Achielognargus chankaeinsis
- Devario asmussii Russian Bitterling, now renamed Acanthorhodeus asmussii
- Chela anastoma, now deemed a synonym of Chela cachius
- Chela anomalurus, now renamed Oxygaster anomalura
- Chela argentea, now deemed a synonym of Salmostoma acinaces
- Chela atpar, now deemed a synonym of Chela cachius
- Chela bacaila, now renamed Salmostoma bacaila
- Chela barroni, now renamed Paralaubuca barroni
- Chela boopis, now deemed a synonym of Salmostoma boopis
- Chela clupeoides, now deemed a synonym of Salmostoma balokee
- Chela dadidurjori, now deemed a synonym of Chela dadiburjori
- Chela dadyburjori, now deemed a synonym of Chela dadiburjori
- Chela dadydurjori, now deemed a synonym of Chela dadiburjori
- Chela diffusa, now deemed a synonym of Salmostoma acinaces
- Chela fasciatus, now deemed a synonym of Chela fasciata
- Chela horai, now renamed Salmostoma horai
- Chela hypophthalmus, now renamed Chela hypophthalmus
- Chela gora, now renamed Securicula gora
- Chela johorensis, now deemed a synonym of Parachela oxygastroides
- Chela maassi, now deemed a synonym of Chela maasi
- Chela maculicauda, now renamed Parachela maculicauda
- Chela megalolepsis, now deemed a synonym of Parachela oxygastroides
- Chela mouhoti, now deemed a synonym of Chela caeruleostigmata
- Chela nicholsi, now deemed a synonym of Paralaubuca sinensis
- Chela oxygaster, now deemed a synonym of Oxygaster anomalura
- Chela oxygastroides, now deemed a synonym of Parachela oxygastroides
- Chela panjabensis, now deemed a synonym of Salmostoma punjabensis
- Chela phulo, now renamed Salmostoma phulo
- Chela punjabensis, now renamed Salmostoma punjabensis
- Chela pointoni, now renamed Oxygaster pointoni
- Chela quangbinhensis, now renamed Danio quangbinhensis
- Chela sardinella, now renamed Salmostoma sardinella
- Chela siamensis, now renamed Parachela siamensis
- Chela sladoni, now renamed Salmostoma sladoni
- Chela stigmabrachium, now renamed Paralaubuca stigmabrachium
- Chela teekanee, now deemed a synonym of Salmostoma balokee
- Chela untrahi, now renamed Salmostoma untrahi
- Inlecypris auropurpureus, now renamed Inlecypris auropurpurea

== See also ==
- Danionins
- List of Danionin species by common name
