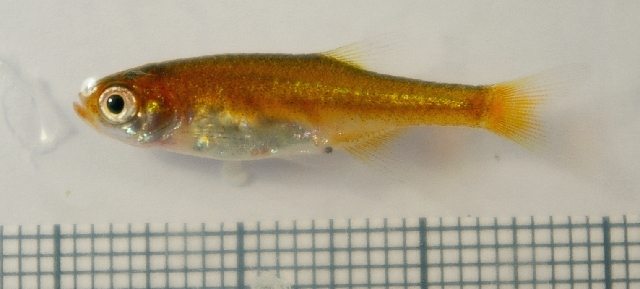
- Microrasbora rubescens

Conservation status
- Endangered (IUCN 3.1)

Scientific classification
- Kingdom: Animalia
- Phylum: Chordata
- Class: Actinopterygii
- Division: Teleostei
- Order: Cypriniformes
- Family: Danionidae
- Subfamily: Danioninae
- Genus: Microrasbora; Annandale, 1918
- Species: M. rubescens

Binomial name
- Microrasbora rubescens Annandale, 1918

= Red dwarf rasbora =

Genus of fishes

The red dwarf rasbora (Microrasbora rubescens) is a species of freshwater ray-finned fish belonging to family Danionidae. It is the only species in the genus Microrasbora. The generic name means "small Rasbora", however these are more closely related to the danios than rasboras. They inhabit freshwater in Myanmar Inle Lake and possibly the Salween River.

== Taxonomy ==
Microrasbora, until recently, included a number of described species. Microrasbora erythromicron was first shown to be a member of the genus Danio in 1999. This move has been confirmed by numerous studies. Three other species, M. gatesi, M. kubotai, and M. nana, and M. microphthalma were moved to a new genus, Microdevario, leaving Microrasbora rubescens as the only confirmed species in the genus. However, Fang et al. did not comment on the placement of Microrasbora microphthalma, although Eschmeyer's Catalog of Fishes has placed this species in Microdevario.

== Description ==
The males dwarf red rasbora reaches up to 3.0 cm (1.2 in) in length, the females dwarf red rasbora reaches up to 4.0 cm (1.6 in) in length. Its meristics are that there are 2 spines and 6-7 soft rays in the dorsal fin and 3 spines and 10-12 soft rays in the anal fin. The females are less intensely coloured than the males and are larger and have a much deeper body, the males have the bright flame red coloured and a distinct metallic blue line above their flame red coloured, while the females have not obviously one, the males will display their best colours and some interesting behaviour as they compete with one other for females attention.

== Habitat ==
The dwarf red rasbora is endemic to Lake Inle which is situated in a valley where the rocks form a karst and which lies 900m above sea level in the Shan Plateau region of Shan State. Within the lake this species can be found in the midwater and in the marginal waters of Lake Inle where it is associated with submerged vegetation and forms large schools.

== Conservation ==
The red dwarf rasbora is exploited for the aquarium trade and it is thought this may have some impact on the population. It is also threatened by the introduction of exotic fish species to the lake, particularly Parambassis and Tilapia species, which act as both predators on and competitors with the red dwarf rasbora. In addition the lake has been polluted from a number of sources, especially from the growing human population in settlements around the lake, while sedimentation and agricultural runoff enters the lake from its drainage basin. The invasive water hyacinth has covered large areas of the lake and this has reduced the area of open water in the lake, this effect being exacerbated by water abstraction and sedimentation.
