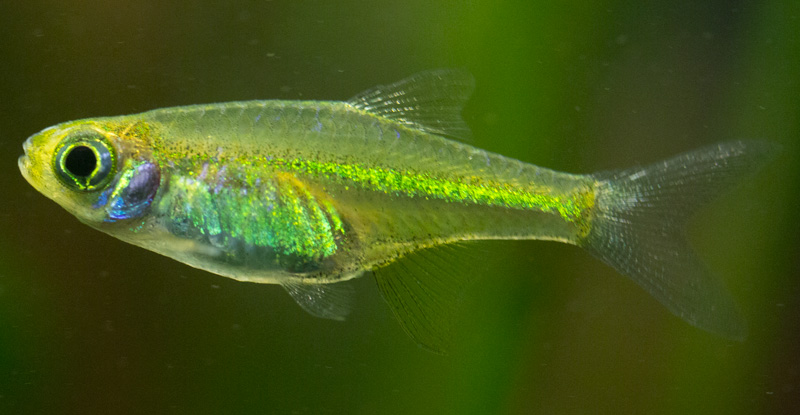
- Microdevario kubotai

Scientific classification
- Kingdom: Animalia
- Phylum: Chordata
- Class: Actinopterygii
- Order: Cypriniformes
- Family: Danionidae
- Subfamily: Danioninae
- Genus: Microdevario; F. Fang, Norén, T. Y. Liao, Källersjö & S. O. Kullander, 2009

Type species
- Microrasbora kubotai Kottelat & Witte, 1990

= Microdevario =

Genus of fishes

Microdevario is a small genus of freshwater ray-finned fish belonging to family Danionidae. It was recently described to include species previously in the genus Microrasbora. These small freshwater fish are native to Burma (Myanmar) and adjacent parts of Thailand, and reach up to 1.5–2.3 cm (0.6–0.9 in) in length depending on the exact species involved.

== Species ==
There are currently three recognized species in this genus:

- Microdevario gatesi (Herre, 1939)
- Microdevario kubotai (Kottelat & K. E. Witte, 1999)
- Microdevario nana (Kottelat & K. E. Witte, 1999)
- Microdevario microphthalma (Y. E. Jiang, X. Y. Chen & J. X. Yang, 2008)
