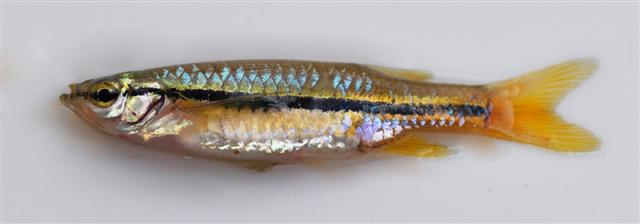

Conservation status
- Least Concern (IUCN 3.1)

Scientific classification
- Kingdom: Animalia
- Phylum: Chordata
- Class: Actinopterygii
- Order: Cypriniformes
- Family: Danionidae
- Subfamily: Esominae
- Genus: Esomus
- Species: E. danrica

Binomial name
- Esomus danrica (F. Hamilton, 1822)

Synonyms
- Cyprinus danrica Hamilton, 1822; Cyprinus jogia Hamilton, 1822; Cyprinus sutiha Hamilton, 1822; Esomus jogia (Hamilton 1822); Perilampus macropterus McClelland, 1839; Perilampus macrourus McClelland, 1839; Perilampis recurvirostris McClelland, 1839; Perilampus thermophilus McClelland, 1839; Leuciscus (Esomus) vittatus Swainson, 1839; Pogonocharax rehi Regan, 1907; Nuria danrica var. grahami Chaudhuri, 1912; Esomus lineatus Ahl, 1924; Esomus danricus jabalpurensis Rao & Sharma, 1972; Esomus manipurensis Tilak & Jain, 1990

= Indian flying barb =

Species of fish

The Indian flying barb (Esomus danrica), historically flying barb, is one of the species known in the group flying barbs owing to their extremely long barbels. It was discovered in 1822 by Francis Hamilton. Not to be mistaken with Esomus metallicus, it is rarely seen in aquaria. It is found in Myanmar, Nepal, Pakistan, Sri Lanka, Bangladesh and India, it is found in many of the same localities as Danio rerio and Danio dangila, an example being the Jorai Rivulet, a tributary of the Sankosh river in Coochbehar district, West Bengal, India. It is locally named "Boirali maach". In Nepalese Terai it is called Dedhawa.

== Description ==
This fish reaches a maximum length of 6 in (15 cm). The Indian flying barb is a silver fish with a black line on an elongated body and gold fins. Barbels reach almost to the anal fin.

== Behaviour ==
This fish has an exceptional ability for jumping, hence its name.

Research in 2001 by Fang Fang suggests that Esomus is the genus most closely related to Danio, closer even than Devario.

- Temperature preference: 20-25 Celsius
- pH preference: 7.6
- Hardness preference: Soft to medium
- Salinity preference: Zero
- Compatibility: Good but fast like most danios, a largeish fish, needs plenty of space
- Life span: Typically 3 to 5 years
- Ease of keeping: Moderate
- Ease of breeding: Moderate to hard
- A tank with a tight fitting lid with no gaps is recommended.
