= Brevibora cheeya =

Conservation status
- Least Concern (IUCN 3.1)

Scientific classification
- Kingdom: Animalia
- Phylum: Chordata
- Class: Actinopterygii
- Order: Cypriniformes
- Family: Danionidae
- Subfamily: Rasborinae
- Genus: Brevibora
- Species: B. cheeya

Binomial name
- Brevibora cheeya T. Y. Liao & H. H. Tan, 2011

Species of fish

Brevibora cheeya is a species of ray-finned fish belonging to the family Danionidae found in Malaysia and Indonesia.
