= Sundadanio margarition =

Conservation status
- Near Threatened (IUCN 3.1)

Scientific classification
- Kingdom: Animalia
- Phylum: Chordata
- Class: Actinopterygii
- Order: Cypriniformes
- Family: Sundadanionidae
- Genus: Sundadanio
- Species: S. margarition

Binomial name
- Sundadanio margarition Conway, Kottelat & H. H. Tan, 2011

Species of fish

Sundadanio margarition is a species of freshwater ray-finned fish belonging to the family Sundadanionidae, the tiny danios. It is endemic to Sarawak, Malaysian Borneo, and known from the Rajang and Sarawak River drainages. It lives in coastal peat swamp forests.

Sundadanio margarition reaches a maximum size of 1.9 cm (0.75 in) standard length.
