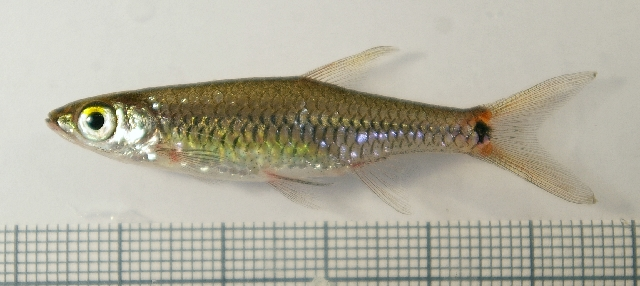

Conservation status
- Least Concern (IUCN 3.1)

Scientific classification
- Kingdom: Animalia
- Phylum: Chordata
- Class: Actinopterygii
- Order: Cypriniformes
- Family: Danionidae
- Subfamily: Rasborinae
- Genus: Kottelatia; T. Y. Liao, S. O. Kullander & F. Fang, 2009
- Species: K. brittani

Binomial name
- Kottelatia brittani (H. R. Axelrod, 1976)

Synonyms
- Rasbora brittani Axelrod, 1976

= Kottelatia =

Species of fish

Kottelatia is a monospecific genus of ray-finned fish belonging to the family Danionidae. The only species in the genus is Kottelatia brittani which is found in Sumatra and peninsular Malaysia.

A common name in use for K. brittani is Brittans Rasbora.
