= Sundadanio echinus =

Conservation status
- Vulnerable (IUCN 3.1)

Scientific classification
- Kingdom: Animalia
- Phylum: Chordata
- Class: Actinopterygii
- Order: Cypriniformes
- Family: Sundadanionidae
- Genus: Sundadanio
- Species: S. echinus

Binomial name
- Sundadanio echinus Conway, Kottelat & H. H. Tan, 2011

Species of fish

Sundadanio echinus is a species of freshwater ray-finned fish belonging to the family Sundadanionidae, the tiny danios. It is endemic to Borneo and found in West Kalimantan (Indonesia) and western Sarawak (Malaysia). It lives in peat swamps and blackwater streams.

Sundadanio echinus reaches a maximum size of 2.1 cm (0.83 in) standard length.
