= Sundadanio retiarius =

Conservation status
- Least Concern (IUCN 3.1)

Scientific classification
- Kingdom: Animalia
- Phylum: Chordata
- Class: Actinopterygii
- Order: Cypriniformes
- Family: Sundadanionidae
- Genus: Sundadanio
- Species: S. retiarius

Binomial name
- Sundadanio retiarius Conway, Kottelat & H. H. Tan, 2011

Species of fish

Sundadanio retiarius is a species of freshwater ray-finned fish belonging to the family Sundadanionidae, the tiny danios. It is endemic to Kalimantan, Indonesian Borneo, and known from the Kotawaringin and Kahayan River drainages. It lives in peat swamps and blackwater streams.

Sundadanio retiarius reaches a maximum size of 1.9 cm (0.75 in) standard length.
