= Brevibora exilis =

Conservation status
- Near Threatened (IUCN 3.1)

Scientific classification
- Kingdom: Animalia
- Phylum: Chordata
- Class: Actinopterygii
- Order: Cypriniformes
- Family: Danionidae
- Subfamily: Rasborinae
- Genus: Brevibora
- Species: B. exilis

Binomial name
- Brevibora exilis T. Y. Liao & H. H. Tan, 2014

Species of fish

Brevibora exilis is a species of ray-finned fish belonging to the family Danionidae found in Sebangau and Kahayan basins in central Kalimantan, Indonesia.
