= Sundadanio rubellus =

Conservation status
- Near Threatened (IUCN 3.1)

Scientific classification
- Kingdom: Animalia
- Phylum: Chordata
- Class: Actinopterygii
- Order: Cypriniformes
- Family: Sundadanionidae
- Genus: Sundadanio
- Species: S. rubellus

Binomial name
- Sundadanio rubellus Conway, Kottelat & H. H. Tan, 2011

Species of fish

Sundadanio rubellus is a species of freshwater ray-finned fish belonging to the family Sundadanionidae, the tiny danios. It is endemic to Kalimantan, Indonesian Borneo, and known from the southern Kapuas River delta. It lives in peat swamp forests.

Sundadanio rubellus reaches a maximum size of 1.9 cm (0.75 in) standard length.
