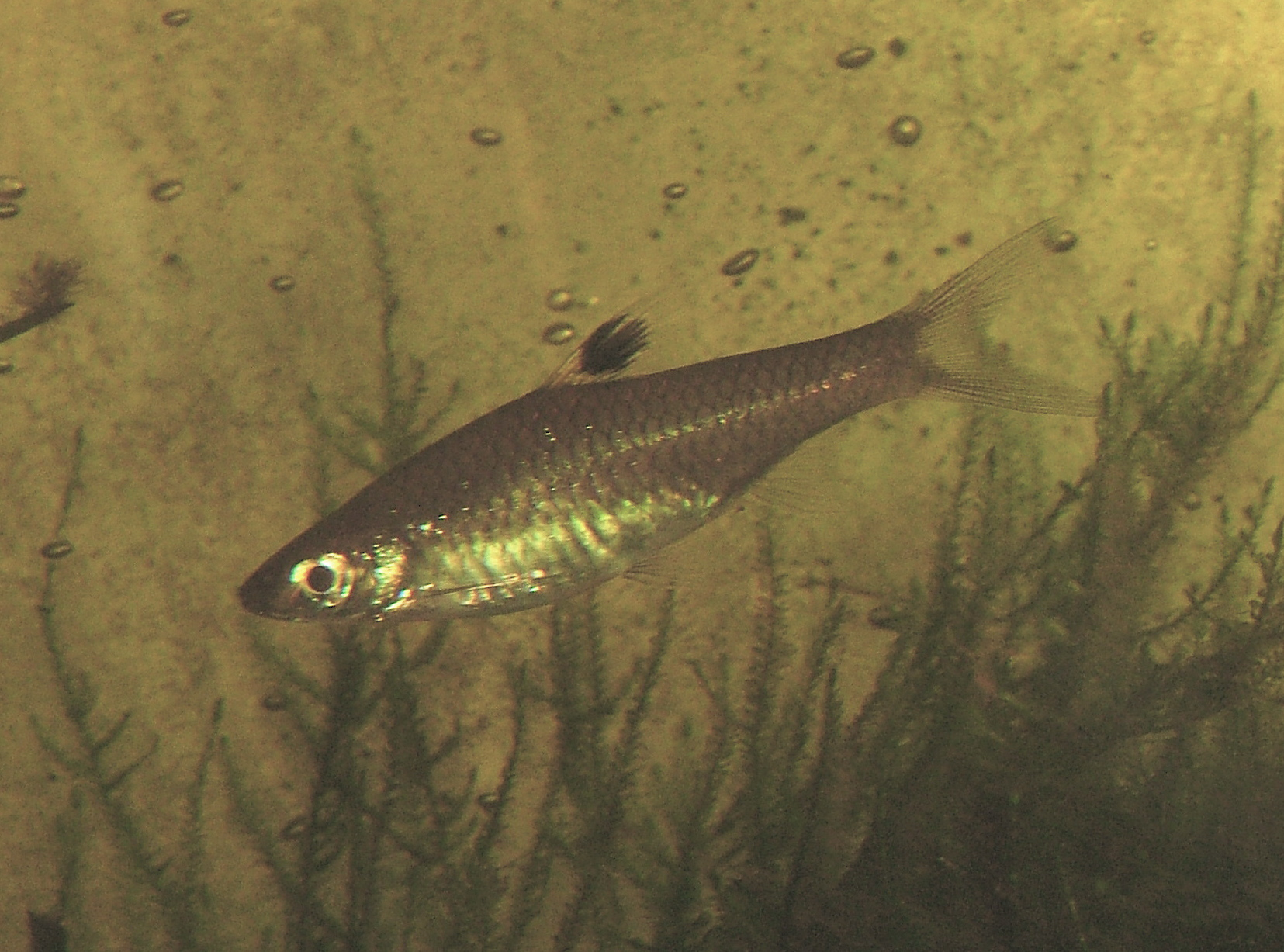
- Eyespot rasbora (Brevibora dorsiocellata)

Scientific classification
- Kingdom: Animalia
- Phylum: Chordata
- Class: Actinopterygii
- Order: Cypriniformes
- Family: Danionidae
- Subfamily: Rasborinae
- Genus: Brevibora; T. Y. Liao, S. O. Kullander & F. Fang, 2010

Type species
- Rasbora dorsiocellata Duncker, 1904

= Brevibora =

Genus of fishes

Brevibora is a genus of freshwater ray-finned fish belonging to the family Danionidae. The fishes in this genus are native to Southeast Asia. They are small, no more than 2.8 cm (1.1 in) in standard length, and restricted to acidic blackwater rivers, streams and peat swamp lakes in the Malay Peninsula, Sumatra and Borneo.

== Species ==
There are currently 3 recognized species in this genus:

- Brevibora cheeya T. Y. Liao & H. H. Tan, 2011
- Brevibora exilis T. Y. Liao & H. H. Tan, 2014
- Brevibora dorsiocellata Duncker, 1904 (Eyespot rasbora)
