= Sundadanio atomus =

Conservation status
- Least Concern (IUCN 3.1)

Scientific classification
- Kingdom: Animalia
- Phylum: Chordata
- Class: Actinopterygii
- Order: Cypriniformes
- Suborder: Cyprinoidei
- Family: Sundadanionidae
- Genus: Sundadanio
- Species: S. atomus

Binomial name
- Sundadanio atomus Conway, Kottelat & H. H. Tan, 2011

Species of fish

Sundadanio atomus is a species of freshwater ray-finned fish belonging to the family Sundadanionidae, the tiny danios. It is endemic to Singkep, off Sumatra (Indonesia). It lives in peat swamp forests.

Sundadanio atomus reaches a maximum size of 1.6 cm (0.63 in) standard length.
