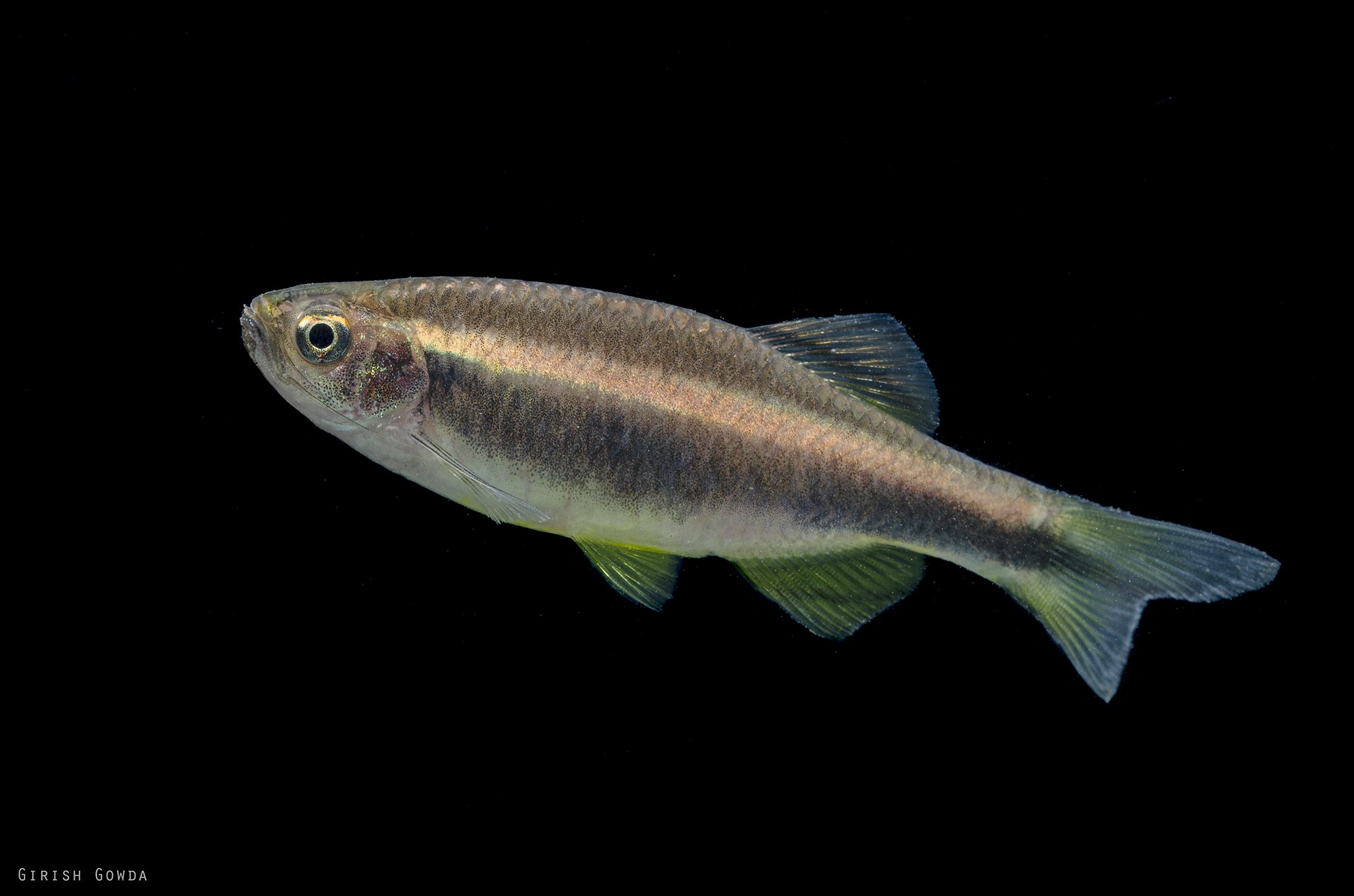
- From agumbe

Conservation status
- Data Deficient (IUCN 3.1)

Scientific classification
- Kingdom: Animalia
- Phylum: Chordata
- Class: Actinopterygii
- Order: Cypriniformes
- Family: Danionidae
- Subfamily: Danioninae
- Genus: Betadevario; P. K. Pramod, F. Fang, Rema Devi, T. Y. Liao, T. J. Indra, K. S. Jameela Beevi & S. O. Kullander, 2010
- Species: B. ramachandrani

Binomial name
- Betadevario ramachandrani Pramod, F. Fang, Rema Devi, T. Y. Liao, Indra, Jameela Beevi & S. O. Kullander, 2010

= Betadevario =

Monospecific genus of fish

Betedevario is a monospecific genus of freshwater ray-finned fish belonging to the family Danionidae. The only species in the genus is Betadevario ramachandrani, a fish that is found only in the upper Seetha River drainage in Karnataka, India. It was found in cascade and riffle-pools of a high-altitude stream.
