= Parachela =

Parachela may refer to:

- Parachela (fish), a genus of fishes in the family Cyprinidae
- Parachela (tardigrade), an order of tardigrades in the class Eutardigrada
