= Esomus bengalensis =

Scientific classification
- Kingdom: Animalia
- Phylum: Chordata
- Class: Actinopterygii
- Order: Cypriniformes
- Family: Danionidae
- Genus: Esomus
- Species: E. bengalensis

Binomial name
- Esomus bengalensis Bhakat & Sinha, 2020

Species of fish

Esomus bengalensis is a species of freshwater ray-finned fish belonging to the family Danionidae. This species was first formally described in 2020 by Somnath Bhakat and Arup Kumar Sinha with its type locality given as the Mayurakshi river at the Tilpara barrage, Suri, Birbhum district in West Bengal. At the type locality the river has a fast current over a mixed bed of rock and sand, with silt deposited at the barrage.
