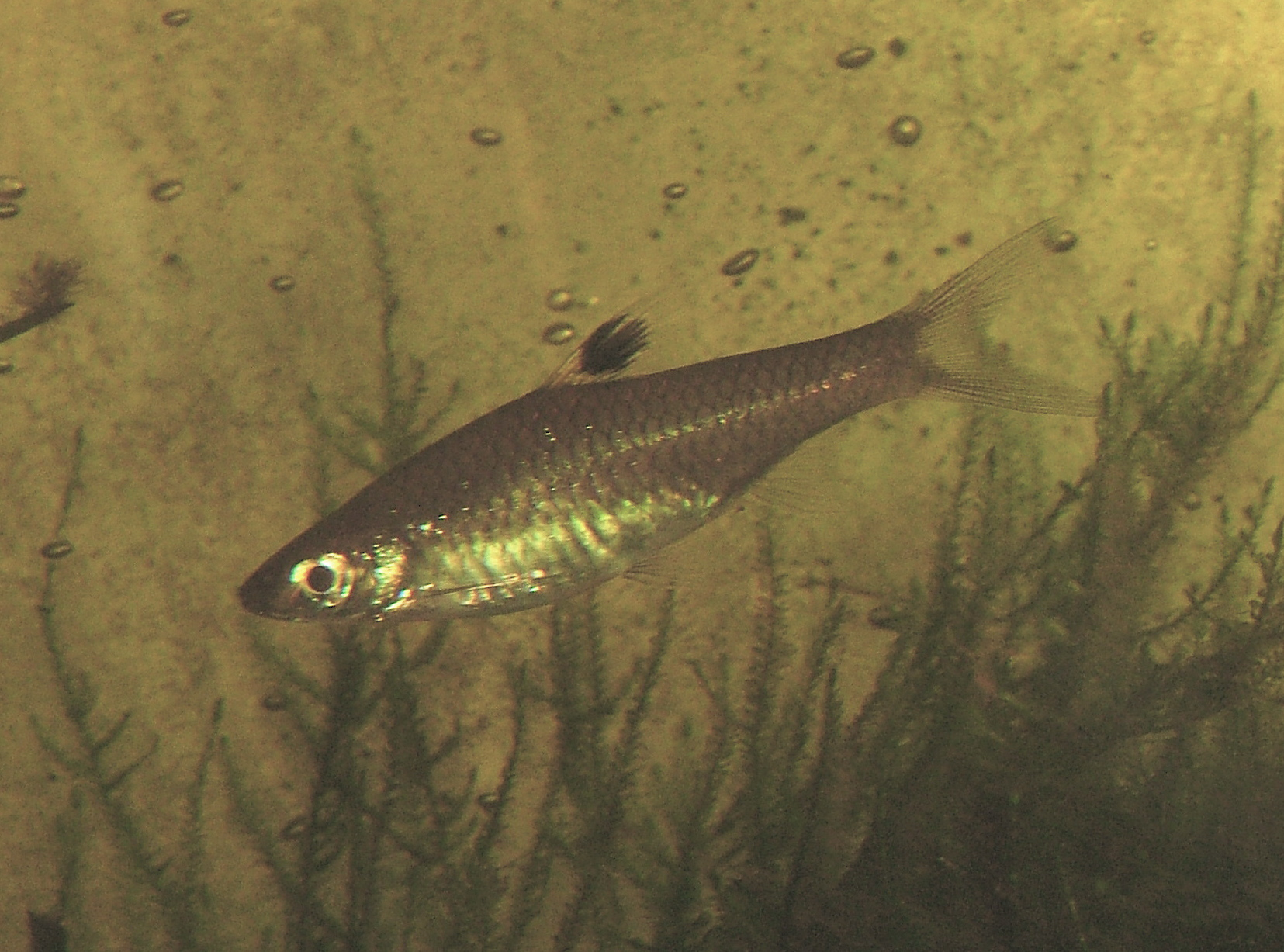

Conservation status
- Endangered (IUCN 3.1)

Scientific classification
- Kingdom: Animalia
- Phylum: Chordata
- Class: Actinopterygii
- Order: Cypriniformes
- Family: Danionidae
- Subfamily: Rasborinae
- Genus: Brevibora
- Species: B. dorsiocellata

Binomial name
- Brevibora dorsiocellata (Duncker, 1904)

Synonyms
- Rasbora dorsiocellata Duncker, 1904; Rasbora macrophthalma Meinken, 1951

= Eyespot rasbora =

Species of fish

The eyespot rasbora (Brevibora dorsiocellata) is a small fish belonging to the family Danionidae, subfamily Rasborinae, which is known by the common names of ocellated rasbora, hi-spot rasbora, and eye-spot rasbora, an allusion to the marking situated upon the dorsal fin. This small fish is a popular aquarium fish, having been one of the species featured in the landmark textbook Exotic Aquarium Fishes by Dr William T. Innes (page 180.1 - see References below). Its appearance in this work only occurs in later editions of the book, however, therefore the species is not subject to the same degree of aquarium domestication as the more familiar harlequin rasbora.

== Distribution ==
It is a native of Malaysia and Sumatra . It is an inhabitant of streams and other waterbodies with an acidic pH, at least some of these being situated in habitats classified as peat swamp forests (more details covered in the Habitat section below). or they found in National water resources

== Description ==
The eyespot rasbora is an elongate fish, with a pointed snout, whose base colour is a reflective, metallic silver, though under some lighting conditions, the fish can take on a yellowish hue, with a slight pink flush present in the ventral area of the body between the operculum and the pelvic fins (corresponding roughly to the sac enclosing the alimentary canal). Under conditions of reflected light, the fish sometimes displays a fine lateral band from the operculum to the end of the caudal peduncle (Walker, 1971, p. 98) this being an olive-gold hue. The fins, with the exception of the dorsal fin, are hyaline, the relation of the pectoral and pelvic fins being typical of the ostariophysans (fishes possessing an auxiliary mechanism for detecting sound consisting of a set of internal bones called the Weberian Ossicles). In such fishes, the pectoral fins are located immediately behind the operculum, whilst the pelvic fins are located further back upon the ventral side of the body - in the case of Brevibora dorsiocellata, their position is to be found vertically beneath the dorsal fin. The dorsal fin is positioned approximately equidistant between the operculum and the caudal fin, and it is the marking upon this fin that gives rise to the common names of the fish: the base colour is white, with a large rounded black oval overlaid upon the base colour, in appearance fancifully likened to an eye.

A fully mature individual fish attains a standard length of 6 cm. There is a smaller variety, the emerald eye rasbora, which attains a standard length of 3 – 4 cm.

Males are cited as possessing a pinkish or reddish hue to the caudal fin during the breeding season (Walker, p. 98) whilst females lack this colour. Otherwise, visual differences between the sexes are far from obvious, and the principal reliable differentiating characteristic is the notably more rounded and fuller-bodied profile of gravid females.

== Habitat ==
It inhabits streams and other watercourses characterised by a mineral-deficient and acidic chemistry, featuring dissolved humic acids. Among tropical Asian watercourses, this chemistry typically arises as a consequence of those waters flowing through peat swamp forests. The waterlogged soils of these forests inhibit the complete decay of leaf litter, and result in the formation of peat, which leaches humic acids and related compounds into the watercourses flowing through these forests.

Because the water chemistry of the fish's natural habitat is similar to that of an entirely different habitat on another continent, namely the blackwater rivers of South America, the species is environmentally compatible in an aquarium with fishes from those habitats (see Aquarium Maintenance below).

== Reproduction ==
It is a typical rasbora with respect to breeding, namely it is a scatterer of non-adhesive eggs, choosing fine-leaved aquatic foliage as the repository for its eggs. However, success at the captive breeding of this species is heavily contingent upon water chemistry - the species is only likely to spawn in soft, acidic water matching that of its natural habitat, and thus particularly scrupulous attention to water chemistry is required if captive breeding is to be attempted. While as an additional measure to control water chemistry, filtration over peat is not vital, it is likely to be a contributory factor in success with this species (or, alternatively, the use of commercially available 'blackwater tonic' type products to condition the water accordingly).

Once the matter of water chemistry has been settled, the breeding aquarium should be furnished with fine-leaved aquatic foliage. Cabomba and Myriophyllyum are suitable choices, and Java moss is likely to be a useful addition to the breeding aquarium as well. Synthetic substitutes can also be utilised if live plants are unavailable, or the requisite species are difficult to obtain. Prospective parents should be conditioned using live foods as described above, and introduced with some care to the breeding aquarium. Note that if the water chemistry of the maintenance aquarium is substantially different from that of the breeding aquarium, acclimatisation of the fishes to the breeding aquarium will be a lengthy process, requiring several weeks to accomplish fully, with gradual changes in water chemistry imposed during that period until the target chemistry for breeding is obtained.

Once conditioned and acclimatised parents are residing in the breeding aquarium, the temperature should be slowly increased to 27 °C, and additional aeration or filter current provided.

Once suitable conditions are provided (and the water chemistry is the most critical factor in determining success), the eyespot rasbora proves to be a relatively enthusiastic and prolific spawner. After rapid darting chases through the aquatic foliage, male and female will assume a side-to-side positional relationship, emit a cloud of eggs and sperm, then after a brief rest pause, resume the chase. This can continue for some time - 2 hours or so - after which anything between 100 and 200 eggs may be laid. Parents should be removed from the breeding aquarium once spawning is completed, in order to forestall any 'egg eating' behaviour that the fishes may manifest.

== Development ==
Fertile eggs require approximately 24 to 36 hours to hatch at a temperature of 27 °C. Upon hatching, the fry are translucent, around 3 to 4 millimetres long, but a peculiarity of the species is that the fry require an additional 3 to 5 days to absorb the yolk sac before becoming free-swimming (Innes, 1966, p. 180.1). Once this process is completed, the young become free-swimming, and at this stage, require very fine sizes of food such as live infusoria for a period of up to 14 days, after which the fry are able to feed upon newly hatched brine shrimp. If infusoria are unavailable, commercial prepared foods for egglayer fry may also be used.

The eyespot rasbora takes approximately 10 to 12 weeks for the fry to assume full adult colouration.

== See also ==
- List of freshwater aquarium fish species
