= Parachela siamensis =

Conservation status
- Least Concern (IUCN 3.1)

Scientific classification
- Kingdom: Animalia
- Phylum: Chordata
- Class: Actinopterygii
- Order: Cypriniformes
- Family: Xenocyprididae
- Genus: Parachela
- Species: P. siamensis

Binomial name
- Parachela siamensis (Günther, 1868)

Synonyms
- Chela siamensis Günther, 1868; Oxygaster siamensis (Günther, 1868)

Species of fish

Parachela siamensis is a species of freshwater ray-finned fish belonging to the family Xenocyprididae, the East Asian minnows or sharpbellies. This species is found in mainland Southeast Asia.

== Habitat ==
Patachela siamensis is found in lowland rivers including streams near peat lands. It is found at the surface in large rivers and lakes. During floods it moves into the flooded forest. It can normally be found alongside Parachela oxygastroides and P. williaminae. Used to make prahok in Cambodia.

== Distribution ==
Patachela siamensis is widely distributed in mainland southeast Asia, from the Mae Klong in Thailand to the lower Mekong basin, in Cambodia (including the Tonle Sap), Laos and Vietnam. It has also been recorded from the Tapi River in southern Thailand.
