= Sundadanio gargula =

Conservation status
- Vulnerable (IUCN 3.1)

Scientific classification
- Kingdom: Animalia
- Phylum: Chordata
- Class: Actinopterygii
- Order: Cypriniformes
- Family: Sundadanionidae
- Genus: Sundadanio
- Species: S. gargula

Binomial name
- Sundadanio gargula Conway, Kottelat & H. H. Tan, 2011

Species of fish

Sundadanio gargula is a species of freshwater ray-finned fish belonging to the family Sundadanionidae, the tiny danios. It is endemic to Bangka Island, off Sumatra (Indonesia). It lives in coastal peat swamp forests.

Sundadanio gargula reaches a maximum size of 1.9 cm (0.75 in) standard length.
