= Chela macrolepis =

Conservation status
- Endangered (IUCN 3.1)

Scientific classification
- Kingdom: Animalia
- Phylum: Chordata
- Class: Actinopterygii
- Order: Cypriniformes
- Family: Danionidae
- Subfamily: Danioninae
- Genus: Chela
- Species: C. macrolepis

Binomial name
- Chela macrolepis Knight & Rema Devi, 2014

Species of fish

Chela macrolepis is a species of freshwater ray-finned fish belonging to the family Danionidae. It is endemic to Chembarambakkam Lake in India.
