= Sundadanio goblinus =

Conservation status
- Endangered (IUCN 3.1)

Scientific classification
- Kingdom: Animalia
- Phylum: Chordata
- Class: Actinopterygii
- Order: Cypriniformes
- Family: Sundadanionidae
- Genus: Sundadanio
- Species: S. goblinus

Binomial name
- Sundadanio goblinus Conway, Kottelat & H. H. Tan, 2011

Species of fish

Sundadanio goblinus is a species of freshwater ray-finned fish belonging to the family Sundadanionidae, the tiny danios. It is endemic to Sumatra (Indonesia). It lives in coastal peat swamp forests.

Sundadanio goblinus reaches a maximum size of 1.9 cm (0.75 in) standard length.
