= Microdevario nana =

Conservation status
- Least Concern (IUCN 3.1)

Scientific classification
- Kingdom: Animalia
- Phylum: Chordata
- Class: Actinopterygii
- Order: Cypriniformes
- Family: Danionidae
- Subfamily: Danioninae
- Genus: Microdevario
- Species: M. nana

Binomial name
- Microdevario nana (Kottelat & K. E. Witte, 1999)

Synonyms
- Microrasbora nana Kottelat & Witte, 1999

Species of fish

Microdevario nana is a species of freshwater ray-finned fish belonging to family Danionidae. This fish is found endemic to Myanmar. It belongs to the genus Microdevario, which contains small danionins. It reaches up to 1.9 cm (0.75 in) in length.
