= Oxygaster pointoni =

Conservation status
- Vulnerable (IUCN 3.1)

Scientific classification
- Kingdom: Animalia
- Phylum: Chordata
- Class: Actinopterygii
- Order: Cypriniformes
- Suborder: Cyprinoidei
- Family: Xenocyprididae
- Genus: Oxygaster
- Species: O. pointoni

Binomial name
- Oxygaster pointoni (Fowler, 1934)

Synonyms
- Chela pointoni Fowler, 1934

Species of fish

Oxygaster pointoni is a freshwater ray-finned fish of the family Xenocyprididae from the rivers of Indochina.

== Habitat and diet ==
Oxygaster pointoni is a pelagic species which can be found near the surface of medium-sized rivers. It probably has a similar diet to Oxygaster anomalura consisting of chironomids and small molluscs.

== Distribution ==
Oxygaster pointoniis found in the Chao Phraya River and Mekong River in Thailand, Cambodia and Laos.

== Human use and threats ==
O. pointoni is not normally encountered in fish markets and this means that it may be exploited at only by at a subsistence fishermen. It is unknown in aquaculture, so any fish harvested will be wild. It is threatened by the pollution and damming of the rivers it inhabits and the population of this fish has thought to have declined by 30% in the ten years up to 2009, which is why the IUCN classified it as "Vulnerable".
