= Malayan flying barb =

Conservation status
- Data Deficient (IUCN 3.1)

Scientific classification
- Kingdom: Animalia
- Phylum: Chordata
- Class: Actinopterygii
- Order: Cypriniformes
- Family: Danionidae
- Subfamily: Esominae
- Genus: Esomus
- Species: E. malayensis

Binomial name
- Esomus malayensis Ahl, 1923

Species of fish

The Malayan flying barb (Esomus malayensis) is a species of cyprinid found in Malaysia and Vietnam. It can be found in freshwater or benthopelagic zone as is generally harmless to human.
