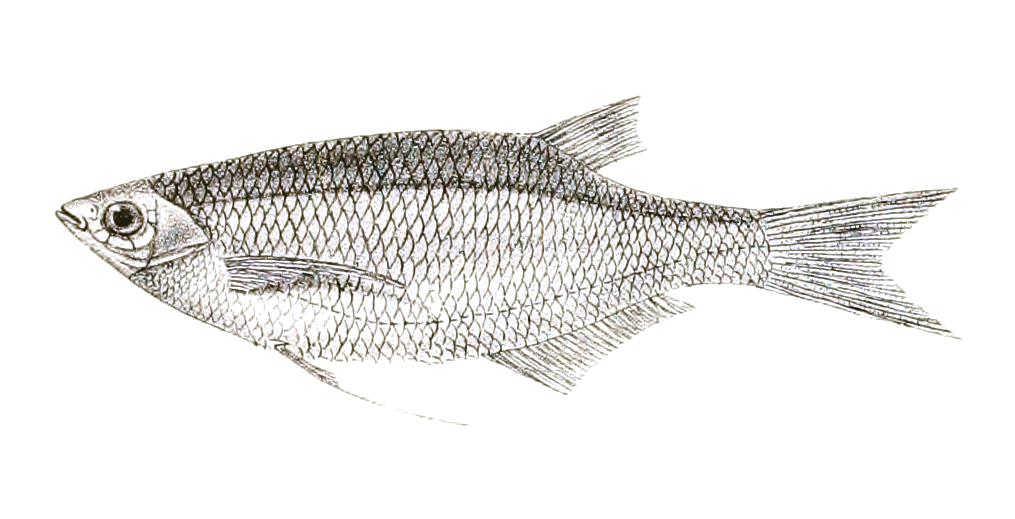

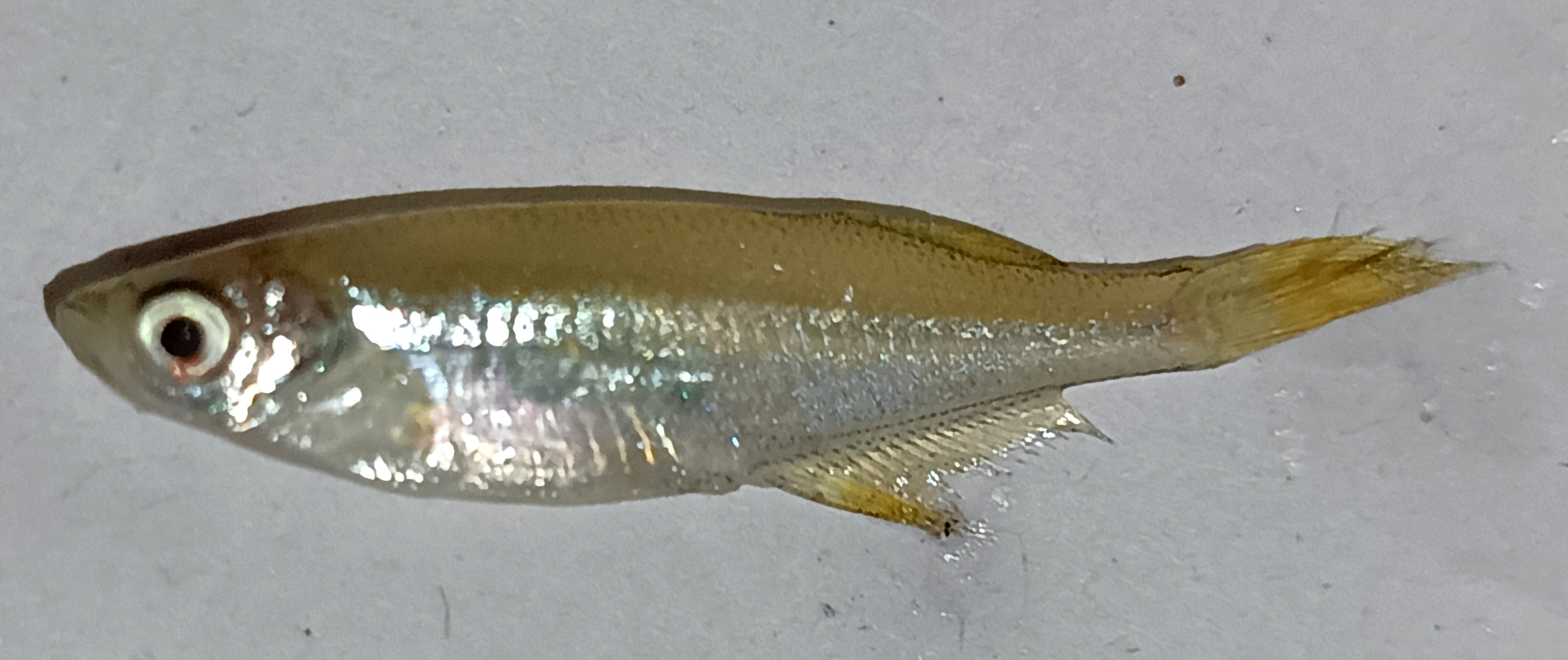

Conservation status
- Least Concern (IUCN 3.1)

Scientific classification
- Kingdom: Animalia
- Phylum: Chordata
- Class: Actinopterygii
- Order: Cypriniformes
- Family: Danionidae
- Subfamily: Danioninae
- Genus: Chela
- Species: C. cachius

Binomial name
- Chela cachius (F. Hamilton, 1822)

Synonyms
- Cyprinus atpar Hamilton, 1822; Chela atpar (Hamilton, 1822); Cyprinus cachius Hamilton, 1822; Leuciscus anastoma Swainson, 1839; Paradanio elegans Day, 1867; Perilampus macropodus Jerdon, 1849; Perilampus psilopteromus McClelland, 1839

= Silver hatchet chela =

Species of fish

The silver hatchet chela (Chela cachius) is a danionin fish in the family Danionidae. Endemic in South Asia, it is found in Pakistan, India, Bangladesh and Myanmar.
