= Devario acrostomus =

Conservation status
- Data Deficient (IUCN 3.1)

Scientific classification
- Kingdom: Animalia
- Phylum: Chordata
- Class: Actinopterygii
- Order: Cypriniformes
- Family: Danionidae
- Genus: Devario
- Species: D. acrostomus

Binomial name
- Devario acrostomus (F. Fang & Kottelat, 1999)

Synonyms
- Danio acrostomus F. Fang & Kottelat, 1999

Species of fish

Devario acrostomus is a freshwater fish native to the Mekong River. It is currently only known from Laos.

It can reach 11.3 cm (4.4 in) in total length.
