= Devario salmonatus =

Conservation status
- Data Deficient (IUCN 3.1)

Scientific classification
- Kingdom: Animalia
- Phylum: Chordata
- Class: Actinopterygii
- Order: Cypriniformes
- Family: Danionidae
- Genus: Devario
- Species: D. salmonatus

Binomial name
- Devario salmonatus Kottelat, 2000

Synonyms
- Danio salmonatus Kottelat, 2000; Devario salmonata (Kottelat, 2000)

Species of fish

Devario salmonatus is a freshwater fish endemic to Xe Nam Noy on the Bolaven Plateau, Mekong drainage in Laos.
