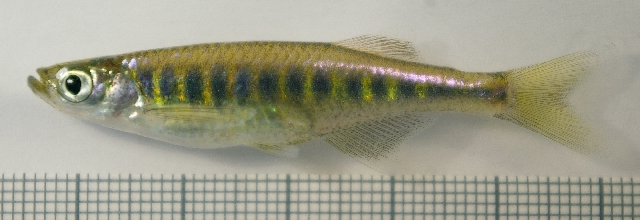

Conservation status
- Endangered (IUCN 3.1)

Scientific classification
- Kingdom: Animalia
- Phylum: Chordata
- Class: Actinopterygii
- Order: Cypriniformes
- Family: Danionidae
- Subfamily: Danioninae
- Genus: Inlecypris
- Species: I. auropurpurea

Binomial name
- Inlecypris auropurpurea (Annandale, 1918)

Synonyms
- Barilius auropurpureus Annandale, 1918; Devario auropurpurea (Annandale, 1918)

= Inlecypris auropurpurea =

Species of fish

Inlecypris auropurpurea is a small species of danionin fish endemic to Lake Inle in Myanmar. It is a schooling species associated with submerged vegetation. It is harvested for aquarium trade, and may be sold under the common name "Lake Inle Danio" or "Lake Inle Trout Danio" in some tropical fish retailers.

== Description ==
Inlecypris auropurpurea can grow to a max standard length of around 60 t0 80 mm on average. They sport a bright purple and blue striped coloration, and are sexually dimorphic with mature females being more robust, less colourful, and a little larger than males.

== Diet ==
In the wild, this species preys chiefly on insects and aquatic invertebrates within its habitat.

== Ecology and behavior ==
Inlecypris auropurpurea is known as a peaceful inhabitant in most aquariums, but tends to not compete well with larger or more boisterous tank mates, where it can encounter difficulty feeding against more robust species.

Similar to most danio species it can be skittish, but this behavior can be reduced by the adding different types of floating plants or maintaining it alongside other open swimming species. As a schooling species it is ideally kept in groups of at least eight to ten other specimens.

== Etymology ==
Inlecypris: from Inlé, is a reference to Inlé Lake, Myanmar, in which this species is endemic, and Cypris, a common suffix for cyprinid genera.

auropurpureus: originating from the Latin aurum, meaning 'gold', and purpureus, meaning 'clothed in purple' in reference to the Danio's bright striped coloration.

It can reach 10 cm (3.9 in) in total length.
