= Microdevario microphthalma =

Scientific classification
- Kingdom: Animalia
- Phylum: Chordata
- Class: Actinopterygii
- Order: Cypriniformes
- Family: Danionidae
- Subfamily: Danioninae
- Genus: Microdevario
- Species: M. microphthalma

Binomial name
- Microdevario microphthalma (Y. E. Jiang, X. Y. Chen & J. X. Yang, 2008)

Synonyms
- Microrasbora micropthalmus Y. E. Jiang, X. Y. Chen & J. X. Yang, 2008

Species of fish

Microdevario microphthalma is a species of freshwater ray-finned fish belonging to family Danionidae. This species is endemic to small hill streams in Yunnan, China. It belongs to the genus Microdevario, which contains small danionins. It reaches up to 2.6 cm (1.0 in) in standard length,its maximum size can reach 4 cm (1.6 in) to 5 cm (2.0 in).
