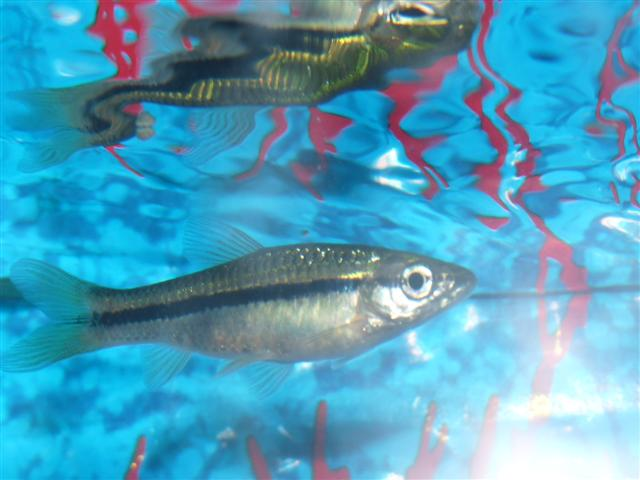

Conservation status
- Least Concern (IUCN 3.1)

Scientific classification
- Kingdom: Animalia
- Phylum: Chordata
- Class: Actinopterygii
- Order: Cypriniformes
- Family: Danionidae
- Subfamily: Esominae
- Genus: Esomus
- Species: E. thermoicos

Binomial name
- Esomus thermoicos (Valenciennes, 1842)

Synonyms
- Leuciscus barbatus Jerdon, 1849; Esomus barbatus (Jerdon 1849); Esomus (Nuria) maderaspatensis Day, 1867; Esomus malabarensis Day, 1867; Esomus danricus brevibarbartus Deraniyagala, 1958

= Esomus thermoicos =

Species of fish

Esomus thermoicos is a species of freshwater ray-finned fish belonging to the family Danionidae. It is found in freshwater streams, ponds and rivers of southern India and Sri Lanka. It is threatened by habitat loss.
