= Parachela melanosticta =

Scientific classification
- Kingdom: Animalia
- Phylum: Chordata
- Class: Actinopterygii
- Order: Cypriniformes
- Family: Xenocyprididae
- Genus: Parachela
- Species: P. melanosticta

Binomial name
- Parachela melanosticta Page, Tangjitjaroen, Limpichat, Randall, Boyd, Tongnunui, and Pfeiffer, 2024

Species of fish

Parachela melanosticta is a species of xenocypridid fish native to the Mae Klong river in Thailand. It was described to science as a new, distinct species in 2024.

== Description ==
Parachela melanosticta is a small fish, growing to around 4.73 cm (1.86 in) in length. In life, it is a silver color across the body while the caudal fin possesses two red spots near the base and two black spots near the tips. It can be distinguished from other members of the genus outside of P. johorensis by these black spots. It can be further distinguished by its pectoral fin reaching its anal fin.

== Etymology ==
The specific name, melanosticta, references the black spots near the tips of the caudal fin.

== Taxonomic evaluation ==
Parachela melanosticta was found to form a clade with P. johorensis.
