= Inlecypris jayarami =

Conservation status
- Data Deficient (IUCN 3.1)

Scientific classification
- Kingdom: Animalia
- Phylum: Chordata
- Class: Actinopterygii
- Order: Cypriniformes
- Family: Danionidae
- Subfamily: Danioninae
- Genus: Inlecypris
- Species: I. jayarami

Binomial name
- Inlecypris jayarami (Barman, 1984)

Synonyms
- Danio jayarami Barman, 1985; Brachydanio jayarami (Barman, 1985); Devario jayarami (Barman, 1985)

Species of fish

Inlecypris jayarami freshwater ray-finned fish belonging to the family Danionidae. This species is found in Lake Inle in Myanmar.
