= Burmese flying barb =

Conservation status
- Least Concern (IUCN 3.1)

Scientific classification
- Kingdom: Animalia
- Phylum: Chordata
- Class: Actinopterygii
- Order: Cypriniformes
- Family: Danionidae
- Subfamily: Esominae
- Genus: Esomus
- Species: E. ahli

Binomial name
- Esomus ahli Hora & Mukerji, 1928

Species of fish

The Burmese flying barb (Esomus ahli) is a species of freshwater ray-finned fish belonging to the family Danionidae. This fish is endemic to Myanmar.
