= Leaping barb =

Conservation status
- Endangered (IUCN 3.1)

Scientific classification
- Kingdom: Animalia
- Phylum: Chordata
- Class: Actinopterygii
- Order: Cypriniformes
- Family: Danionidae
- Subfamily: Danioninae
- Genus: Laubuka
- Species: L. caeruleostigmata

Binomial name
- Laubuka caeruleostigmata H. M. Smith, 1931

Synonyms
- Chela caeruleostigmata (H. M. Smith, 1931); Chela mouhoti H. M. Smith, 1945; Laubuca mouhoti (H. M. Smith, 1945)

Species of fish

The leaping barb or flying minnow (Laubuka caeruleostigmata), is a species of freshwater ray-finned fish belonging to family Danionidae. This fish is found in the Mekong and the Chao Phraya.
