= Queen danio =

Conservation status
- Least Concern (IUCN 3.1)

Scientific classification
- Kingdom: Animalia
- Phylum: Chordata
- Class: Actinopterygii
- Order: Cypriniformes
- Family: Danionidae
- Subfamily: Danioninae
- Genus: Devario
- Species: D. regina

Binomial name
- Devario regina (Fowler, 1934)

Synonyms
- Danio regina Fowler, 1934; Danio suvatti Fowler, 1939; Devario suvatti (Fowler, 1939); Danio peninsulae H. M. Smith, 1945; Devario peninsulae (H. M. Smith, 1945)

Species of fish

The queen danio or Fowler's danio (Devario regina) is a species of freshwater ray-finned fish belonging to the family Danionidae. Originating in India, Myanmar, Thailand, northwestern Malaya, and the Mekong River basin, this fish is sometimes found in community tanks by fish-keeping hobbyists. It grows to a maximum length of 3.1 in (7.9 cm).

In the wild, the queen danio is a rheophilic species found in fast-moving rivers with sandy bottoms in a tropical climate, and prefer water with an ideal temperature range of 73–77 °F (23–25 °C). Its diet consists of annelid worms, small crustaceans, and insects. The queen danio is oviparous.

== Names ==
English: Queen danio
Malay (Malaysian): Seluang pipih

== See also ==
- List of freshwater aquarium fish species
