= Fangfangia =

Conservation status
- Near Threatened (IUCN 3.1)

Scientific classification
- Kingdom: Animalia
- Phylum: Chordata
- Class: Actinopterygii
- Order: Cypriniformes
- Family: Sundadanionidae
- Genus: Fangfangia; Britz, Kottelat & H. H. Tan, 2012
- Species: F. spinicleithralis

Binomial name
- Fangfangia spinicleithralis Britz, Kottelat & H. H. Tan, 2012

Monotypic genus of ray-finned fish

Fangfangia is a monospecific genus of freshwater ray-finned fish belonging to the family Sundadanionidae, the tiny danios. The only species in the genus is Fangfangia spinicleithralis a species endemic to Indonesia where it is found in the peat swamp forests of Kalimantan Tengah, Borneo. The genus name Fangfangia honors the Chinese-Swedish ichthyologist Fang Fang Kullander, who specialized in the study of cyprinid fishes.
