= Devario laoensis =

Conservation status
- Least Concern (IUCN 3.1)

Scientific classification
- Kingdom: Animalia
- Phylum: Chordata
- Class: Actinopterygii
- Order: Cypriniformes
- Family: Danionidae
- Genus: Devario
- Species: D. laoensis

Binomial name
- Devario laoensis (Pellegrin & P. W. Fang, 1940)

Synonyms
- Parabarilius laoensis Pellegrin & P.W. Fang, 1940; Danio laoensis (Pellegrin & P.W. Fang, 1940); Daniops myersi H. M. Smith, 1945; Danio muongthanhensis V. H. Nguyễn, 2002

Species of fish

Devario laoensis is a species of danionin, a group of small minnow-type fish belonging to the family Danionidae. They are native to the fresh waters of Southeast Asia.
