= Devario apopyris =

Conservation status
- Vulnerable (IUCN 3.1)

Scientific classification
- Kingdom: Animalia
- Phylum: Chordata
- Class: Actinopterygii
- Order: Cypriniformes
- Family: Danionidae
- Subfamily: Danioninae
- Genus: Devario
- Species: D. apopyris

Binomial name
- Devario apopyris (F. Fang & Kottelat, 1999)

Synonyms
- Danio apopyris F. Fang & Kottelat 1999

Species of fish

Devario apopyris is a freshwater fish endemic to northern Laos. It is currently only known from its type locality in the Nam Youan watershed (Mekong basin); its true range is likely to extend into Yunnan, China. It grows to 3.8 cm (1.5 in) standard length.
