= Mekong flying barb =

Conservation status
- Data Deficient (IUCN 3.1)

Scientific classification
- Kingdom: Animalia
- Phylum: Chordata
- Class: Actinopterygii
- Order: Cypriniformes
- Family: Danionidae
- Subfamily: Esominae
- Genus: Esomus
- Species: E. longimanus

Binomial name
- Esomus longimanus (Lunel, 1881)

Synonyms
- Nuria longimana Lunel, 1881; Esomus goddardi Fowler, 1937

Species of fish

The Mekong flying barb (Esomus longimanus) is a species of freshwater ray-finned fish belonging to the family Danionidae. This species is found in the Mekong River basin in Thailand, Laos, Cambodia and Viet Nam.
