= Paralaubuca riveroi =

Conservation status
- Least Concern (IUCN 3.1)

Scientific classification
- Kingdom: Animalia
- Phylum: Chordata
- Class: Actinopterygii
- Order: Cypriniformes
- Suborder: Cyprinoidei
- Family: Xenocyprididae
- Genus: Paralaubuca
- Species: P. riveroi

Binomial name
- Paralaubuca riveroi (Fowler, 1935)

Synonyms
- Culter riveroi Fowler, 1935

Species of fish

Paralaubuca riveroi is a species of freshwater ray-finned fish belonging to the family Xenocyprididae, the East Asian minnows or sharpbellies. This fish occurs in Southeast Asia.

== Common names ==
Plā pæb mæ̀n̂ả (Thai: ปลาแปบแม่น้ำ; literally; River Abramine)

== Habitat ==
They were found in freshwater.

== Distribution ==
Thus species is found in the Malay Peninsula as well as the Mekong, Mae Klong, and Chao Phraya basins.

== Description ==
It grows to 18 cm (7.1 in) standard length.

== Utilization ==
-
