= Microdevario gatesi =

Conservation status
- Least Concern (IUCN 3.1)

Scientific classification
- Kingdom: Animalia
- Phylum: Chordata
- Class: Actinopterygii
- Order: Cypriniformes
- Family: Danionidae
- Genus: Microdevario
- Species: M. gatesi

Binomial name
- Microdevario gatesi (Herre, 1939)

Synonyms
- Microrasbora gatesi Herre, 1939

Species of fish

Microdevario gatesi is a species of freshwater ray-finned fish belonging to family Danionidae. This fish is found in southeast Asian rivers and streams. It belongs to the genus Microdevario, which contains small danionins. It is endemic to the lower Irrawaddy River drainage in south central Myanmar. It reaches up to 2.3 cm (0.91 in) in length.
