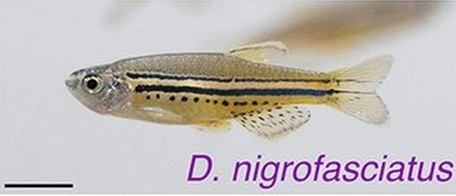

Conservation status
- Data Deficient (IUCN 3.1)

Scientific classification
- Kingdom: Animalia
- Phylum: Chordata
- Class: Actinopterygii
- Order: Cypriniformes
- Family: Danionidae
- Subfamily: Danioninae
- Genus: Danio
- Species: D. nigrofasciatus

Binomial name
- Danio nigrofasciatus (F. Day, 1870)

Synonyms
- Barilius nigrofasciatus Day, 1870; Brachydanio nigrofasciatus (Day 1870); Danio analipunctatus Boulenger, 1911

= Spotted danio =

Species of fish

The spotted danio or dwarf danio (Danio nigrofasciatus) is a tropical is a small freshwater ray-finned fish belonging to the family Danionidae. Originating in northern Myanmar, this fish is sometimes found in community tanks by fish-keeping hobbyists. It grows to a maximum length of 1.5 in (38 mm) to 1.6 in (41 mm).

In the wild, the spotted danio is found in rivers in a tropical climate and prefers water with a pH of 6.5 – 7.0 and a hardness of 5.0 – 12.0 dGH, and an ideal temperature range of 75–82 °F (24–28 °C). The spotted danio is oviparous (an egg layer).
