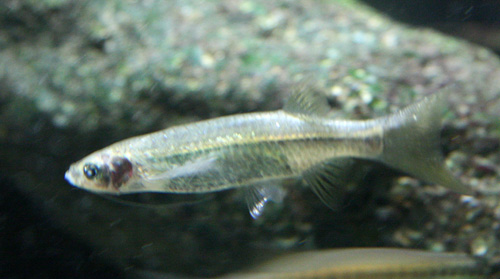

Conservation status
- Least Concern (IUCN 3.1)

Scientific classification
- Kingdom: Animalia
- Phylum: Chordata
- Class: Actinopterygii
- Order: Cypriniformes
- Family: Danionidae
- Subfamily: Esominae
- Genus: Esomus
- Species: E. metallicus

Binomial name
- Esomus metallicus Ahl, 1923

= Esomus metallicus =

Species of fish

Esomus metallicus, sometimes known as striped flying barb (although the common name is usually reserved for Esomus lineatus), is a species of freshwater ray-finned fish belonging to the family Danionidae. This fish is found in Southeast Asia (Myanmar, Laos, Thailand, Cambodia, Vietnam, and Peninsular Malaysia), including the Salween, Mekong, and Chao Phraya river systems. It is found in fresh and brackish water. It grows to 7.5 cm (3.0 in) standard length.

== Utilization ==
Esomus metallicus is used as food and is found in the aquarium trade.
