= Parachela microlepis =

Scientific classification
- Kingdom: Animalia
- Phylum: Chordata
- Class: Actinopterygii
- Order: Cypriniformes
- Family: Xenocyprididae
- Genus: Parachela
- Species: P. microlepis

Binomial name
- Parachela microlepis Page, Tangjitjaroen, Limpichat, Randall, Boyd, Tongnunui, and Pfeiffer, 2024

Species of fish

Parachela microlepis is a species of xenocypridid fish native to the Mae Klong and Mekong rivers in Thailand. It was described to science as a distinct species in 2024.

== Description ==
Parachela microlepis is a small fish, growing to around 4.41 cm (1.74 in) in length. In life, it is a silver color across the entire body and fins, with a gold-coppery stripe down the spine. It can be distinguished from all other members of the genus by its six pelvic fin rays, amount of lateral-line scales, and distinctive snout and anal fin shapes.

== Etymology ==
The specific name, microlepis, references the much smaller scale size in comparison to other members of the genus.

== Taxonomic evaluation ==
Parachela microlepis was found to have formed two different distinct clades within the species, one native to the Mekong and the other to the Mae Klong.
