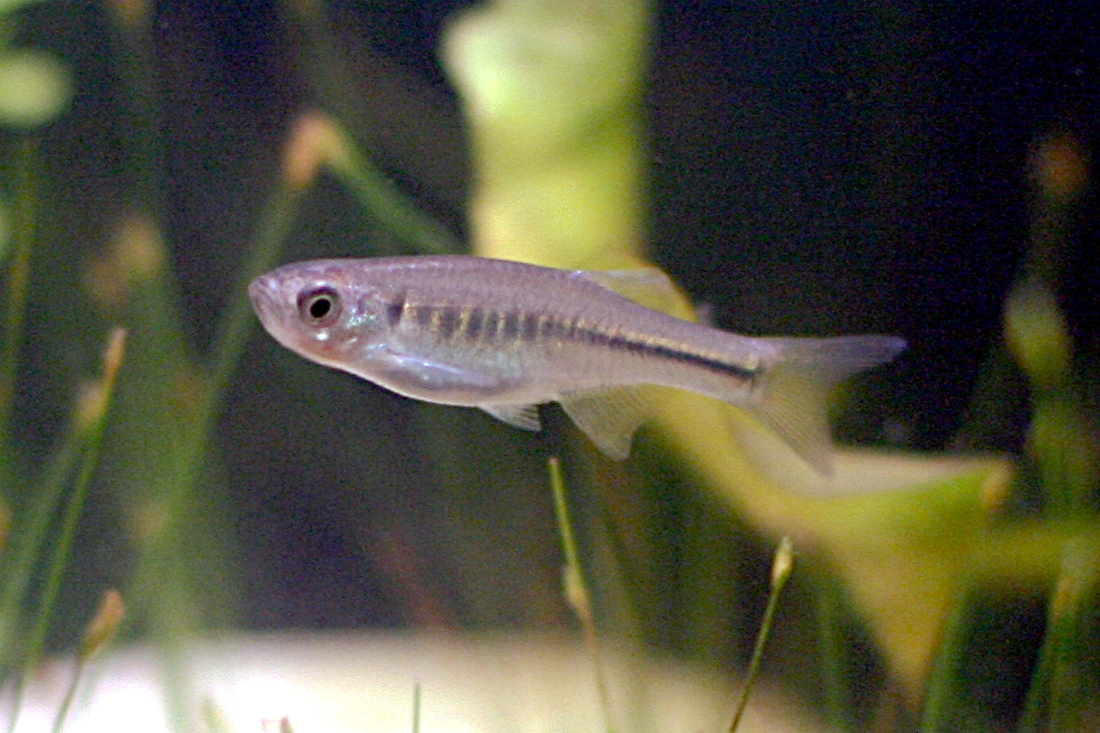

Conservation status
- Data Deficient (IUCN 3.1)

Scientific classification
- Kingdom: Animalia
- Phylum: Chordata
- Class: Actinopterygii
- Order: Cypriniformes
- Family: Danionidae
- Subfamily: Danioninae
- Genus: Inlecypris
- Species: I. maetaengensis

Binomial name
- Inlecypris maetaengensis (F. Fang, 1997)

Synonyms
- Danio maetaengensis Fang, 1997; Devario maetaengensis (F. Fang, 1997)

= Fire bar danio =

Species of fish

The fire bar danio, Maetaeng danio, or tiger danio (Inlecypris maetaengensis), is a small freshwater ray-finned fish belonging to the family Danionidae. This fish is found in the Ping River basin. Its description includes:

- Maximum length: 2 inches
- Colors: Brown, yellow, green, red
- Temperature preference: Unknown
- pH preference: 6 to 7
- Hardness preference: Soft to medium
- Salinity preference: Low to medium
- Compatibility: Good but fast like most danios
- Lifespan: Unknown, probably three to four years
- Ease of keeping: Moderate
- Ease of breeding: Moderate to hard
