= Devario sondhii =

Conservation status
- Data Deficient (IUCN 3.1)

Scientific classification
- Kingdom: Animalia
- Phylum: Chordata
- Class: Actinopterygii
- Order: Cypriniformes
- Family: Danionidae
- Subfamily: Danioninae
- Genus: Devario
- Species: D. sondhii

Binomial name
- Devario sondhii (Hora & Mukerji, 1934)

Synonyms
- Danio sondhii Hora & Mukerji, 1934; Brachydanio sondhii (Hora & Mukerji, 1934)

Species of fish

Devario sondhii is a species of freshwater ray-finned fish belonging to the family Danionidae. This fish is found in Myanmar. It is oviparous.
