= Devario acuticephala =

Conservation status
- Vulnerable (IUCN 3.1)

Scientific classification
- Kingdom: Animalia
- Phylum: Chordata
- Class: Actinopterygii
- Order: Cypriniformes
- Family: Danionidae
- Subfamily: Danioninae
- Genus: Devario
- Species: D. acuticephala

Binomial name
- Devario acuticephala (Hora, 1921)

Synonyms
- Brachydanio acuticephala Hora, 1923

Species of fish

Devario acuticephala is a small danionin from Manipur in India. It grows to approximately 1.5 inches and has a black line along its length and an area of red below the black line posterior to the dorsal. They are mostly found in hill streams and ponds.
