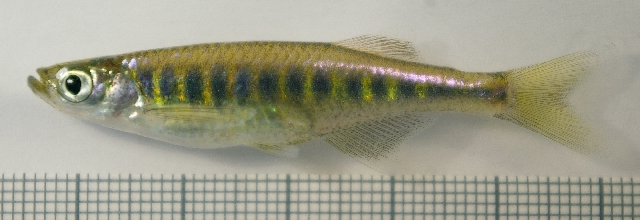
- Inlecypris auropurpurea

Scientific classification
- Kingdom: Animalia
- Phylum: Chordata
- Class: Actinopterygii
- Order: Cypriniformes
- Family: Danionidae
- Subfamily: Danioninae
- Genus: Inlecypris; Howes, 1980

Type species
- Barilius auropurpureus Annandale, 1918

= Inlecypris =

Genus of cyprinid fishes

Inlecypris is a genus of freshwater ray-finned fish belonging to the family Danionidae. The fishes in this genus are from Southeast Asia in Myanmar and Thailand.

== Species ==
Inlecypris contains the following recognised species;

- Inlecypris auropurpurea (Annandale, 1918)
- Inlecypris jayarami (Barman, 1985)
- Inlecypris maetaengensis (F. Fang, 1997) (Fire bar danio)
