= Paralaubuca harmandi =

Conservation status
- Least Concern (IUCN 3.1)

Scientific classification
- Kingdom: Animalia
- Phylum: Chordata
- Class: Actinopterygii
- Order: Cypriniformes
- Suborder: Cyprinoidei
- Family: Xenocyprididae
- Genus: Paralaubuca
- Species: P. harmandi

Binomial name
- Paralaubuca harmandi Sauvage, 1883

Synonyms
- Culter siamensis Hora, 1923; Culter wolfi Fowler, 1937

Species of fish

Paralaubuca harmandi is a species of freshwater ray-finned fish belonging to the family Xenocyprididae, the East Asian minnows or sharpbellies. This fish is from south east Asia. It occurs in the Mekong and Chao Praya in Thailand, Laos, Cambodia and Vietnam. It is a solitary species which is normally found as scattered individuals in the shallow and medium depths of large rivers. It feeds on zooplankton and insects of larger size than the other species in Paralaubuca. It moves into floodplains during the monsoon to feed and maybe to breed, and it has also been recorded undertaking short migrations upstream in rivers. It is fished for by both commercial and subsistence fisheries and it is processed into fermented products in Cambodia while elsewhere it is salted and dried. This species is rare in the aquarium trade.
