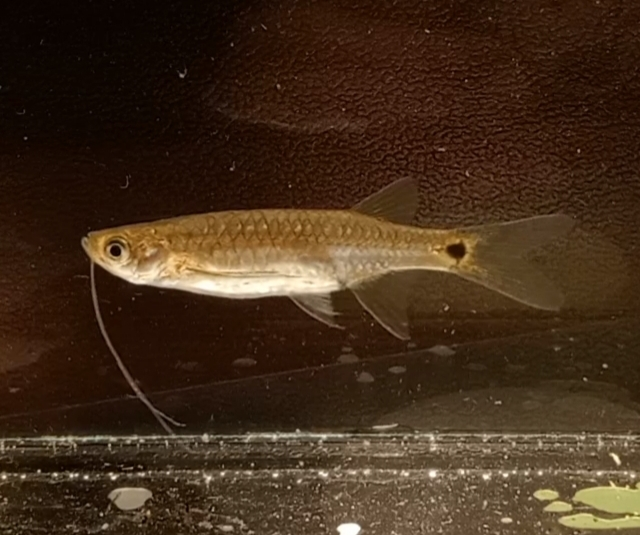
- Esomus caudiocellatus

Conservation status
- Least Concern (IUCN 3.1)

Scientific classification
- Kingdom: Animalia
- Phylum: Chordata
- Class: Actinopterygii
- Order: Cypriniformes
- Family: Danionidae
- Subfamily: Esominae
- Genus: Esomus
- Species: E. caudiocellatus

Binomial name
- Esomus caudiocellatus Ahl, 1923

= Esomus caudiocellatus =

Species of fish

Esomus caudiocellatus is a species of freshwater ray-finned fish belonging to the family Danionidae. This species is found in the Irrawaddy River and Sittaung River drainages to the lower Salween basins in Myanmar. It may also be found in nearby drainages on China and the Malay Peninsula of western Thailand and northern Malaysia.
