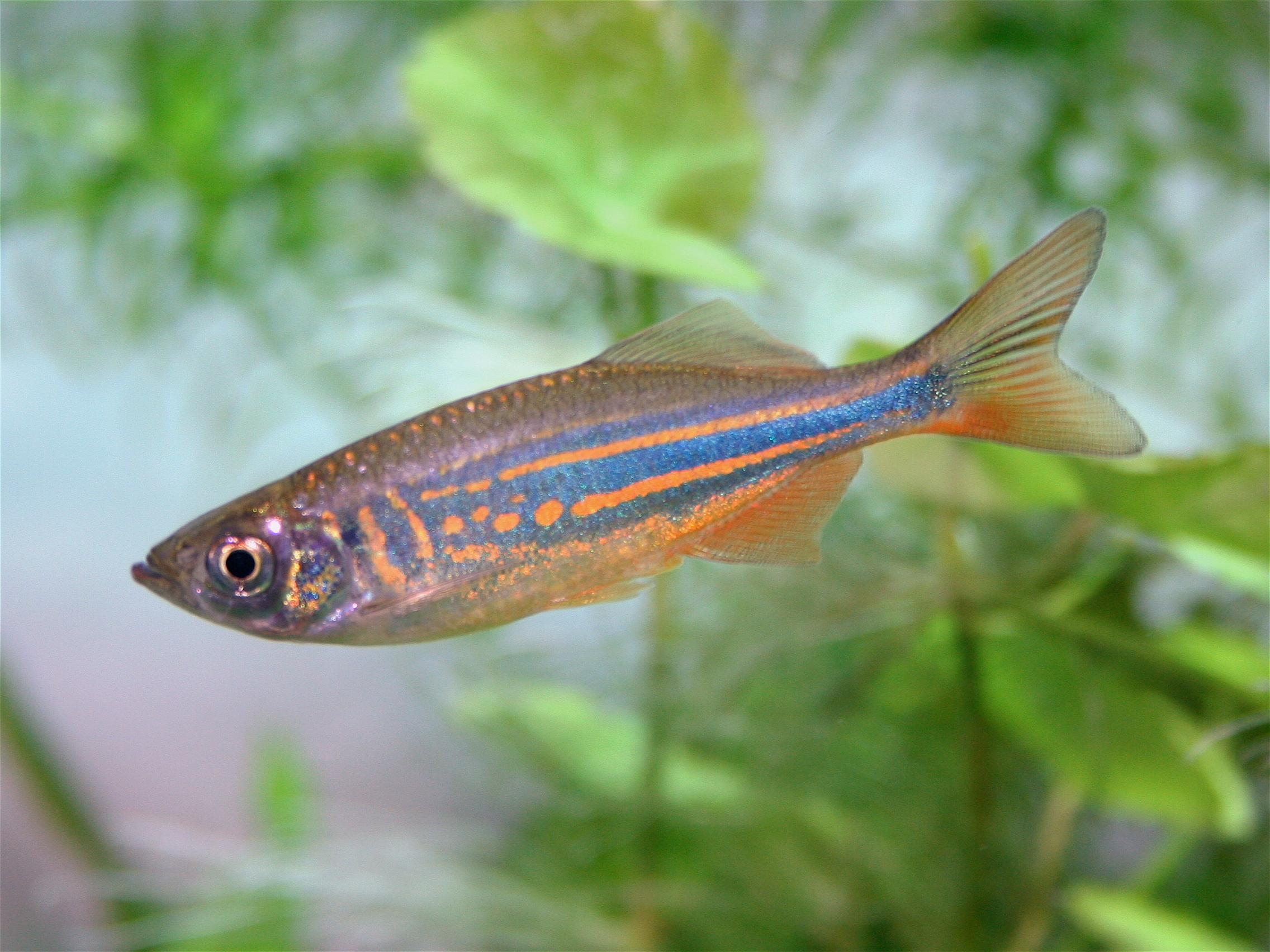
- Image of Devario aequipinnatus

Conservation status
- Data Deficient (IUCN 3.1)

Scientific classification
- Kingdom: Animalia
- Phylum: Chordata
- Class: Actinopterygii
- Order: Cypriniformes
- Family: Danionidae
- Subfamily: Danioninae
- Genus: Devario
- Species: D. quangbinhensis

Binomial name
- Devario quangbinhensis (T. T. Nguyen, V. T. Le & X. K. Nguyễn, 1999)

Synonyms
- Danio quangbinhensis Nguyen, Le & Nguyen, 1999; Chela quangbinhensis (Nguyen, Le & Nguyen, 1999); Danio trangi S. V. Ngô, 2003

= Devario quangbinhensis =

Species of fish

Devario quangbinhensis (Vietnamese: cá phong nha) is a species of freshwater ray-finned fish belonging to the family Danionidae. This species is found only in Phong Nha-Kẻ Bàng National Park, Quảng Bình Province, North Central Coast, Vietnam. It is sometimes found in the ornamental fish trade.

== Characteristics ==
Adult males reach lengths of 8.5 cm.
