= Devario leptos =

Conservation status
- Least Concern (IUCN 3.1)

Scientific classification
- Kingdom: Animalia
- Phylum: Chordata
- Class: Actinopterygii
- Order: Cypriniformes
- Family: Danionidae
- Subfamily: Danioninae
- Genus: Devario
- Species: D. leptos

Binomial name
- Devario leptos (F. Fang & Kottelat, 1999)

Synonyms
- Danio leptos F. Fang & Kottelat, 1999

Species of fish

Devario leptos is a freshwater fish found in the Nam Tha and Nam Beng watersheds in Laos.
