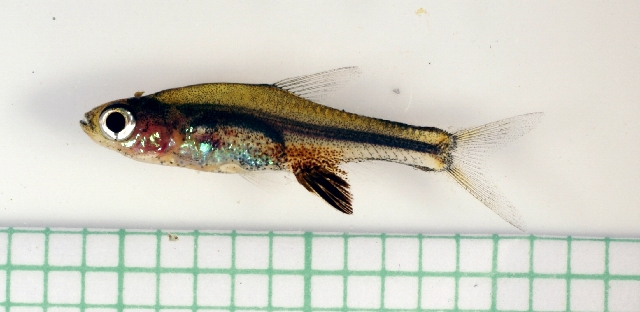

Conservation status
- Vulnerable (IUCN 3.1)

Scientific classification
- Kingdom: Animalia
- Phylum: Chordata
- Class: Actinopterygii
- Order: Cypriniformes
- Suborder: Cyprinoidei
- Family: Sundadanionidae
- Genus: Sundadanio
- Species: S. axelrodi

Binomial name
- Sundadanio axelrodi (Brittan, 1976)

Synonyms
- Rasbora axelrodi Brittan, 1976

= Sundadanio axelrodi =

Species of fish

Sundadanio axelrodi is a species of freshwater ray-finned fish belonging to the family Sundadanionidae, the tiny danios. This fish is known only from Bintan Island in the Riau Islands east of Sumatra. Originally described as a rasbora, Rasbora axelrodi, this tiny species was later deemed to be more closely related to the danios but not enough to be moved into the genus Danio. Sundadanio axelrodi reaches a maximum size of 1.7 cm. Sundadanio was considered monotypic until the genus was reassessed by Conway, Kottelat and Tan in 2011.

== Etymology ==
Named in honor of pet-book publisher Herbert R. Axelrod (b. 1927), who discovered this species in the tanks of a Singapore aquarium fish exporter.
