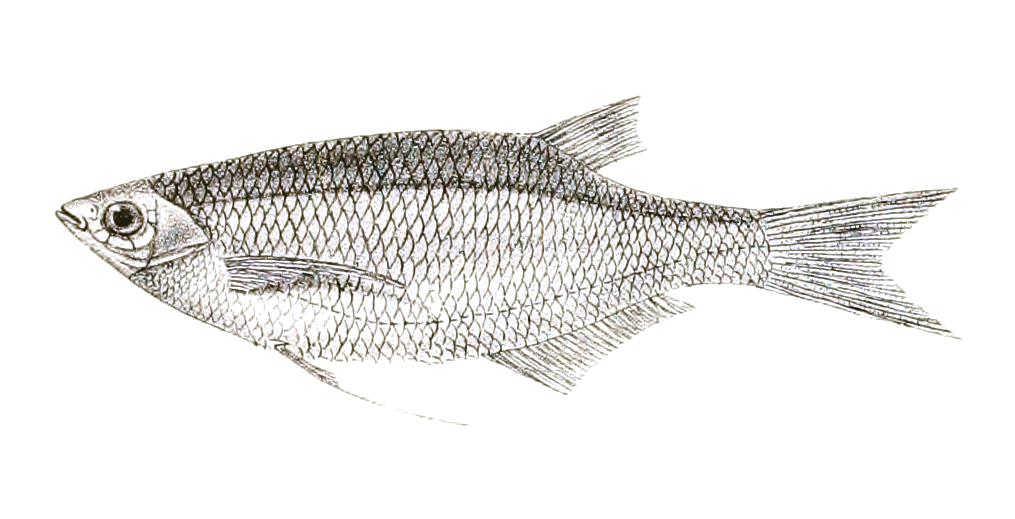
- Chela cachius

Scientific classification
- Domain: Eukaryota
- Kingdom: Animalia
- Phylum: Chordata
- Class: Actinopterygii
- Order: Cypriniformes
- Family: Danionidae
- Subfamily: Danioninae
- Genus: Chela; F. Hamilton, 1822

Type species
- Cyprinus (Chela) cachius Hamilton, 1822

= Chela (fish) =

Genus of fishes

Chela is a genus of small danionin freshwater fish from South Asia that are closely related to Laubuka.

== Species ==
These are the currently recognized species in this genus:

- Chela cachius (F. Hamilton, 1822) (Silver hatchet chela)
- Chela macrolepis Knight & Rema Devi, 2014
