= Paralaubuca typus =

Conservation status
- Least Concern (IUCN 3.1)

Scientific classification
- Kingdom: Animalia
- Phylum: Chordata
- Class: Actinopterygii
- Order: Cypriniformes
- Family: Xenocyprididae
- Genus: Paralaubuca
- Species: P. typus

Binomial name
- Paralaubuca typus (Bleeker, 1864)

Synonyms
- Chela paralaubuca Günther, 1868; Pseudolaubuca lateralis Sauvage, 1876; Chela stigmabrachium Fowler, 1934; Paralaubuca stigmabrachium (Fowler, 1934)

Species of fish

Paralaubuca typus is a species of freshwater ray-finned fish belonging to the family Xenocyprididae, the East Asian minnows or sharpbellies. This fish occurs in south-east Asia. It is found in Thailand in the basins of the Chao Phraya, Tapi, Mekong and Mae Klong and in the Mekong on Laos and Cambodia, as well as Vietnam where it is also found in the La Ngà River. It is one of the most abundant fish species in the lower Mekong.

Paralaubuca typus inhabits shallow areas of large rivers, where it typically schools and is frequently harvested in significant quantities. During periods of high water levels, it moves into flooded forests, returning to the rivers as water levels recede. Spawning occurs during the onset of seasonal floods, usually between May and July. The eggs and larvae are carried downstream by the current and into inundated areas, where they develop further. It is a long distance migrant, moving out of Tonle Sap upstream in the Mekong between November–February. It feeds on zooplankton and occasionally on insects.

It is a target species for both commercial and subsistence fisheries. It is sometimes sold as fresh fish but it is more often dried or used to make a fermented fish sauce. Deforestation, water pollution, dams and water abstraction are threats to this species.
