= Paralaubuca =

Scientific classification
- Kingdom: Animalia
- Phylum: Chordata
- Class: Actinopterygii
- Order: Cypriniformes
- Family: Xenocyprididae
- Genus: Paralaubuca; Bleeker, 1864

Type species
- Paralaubuca typus Bleeker, 1864

Synonyms
- Cultrops H. M. Smith, 1938

Genus of fishes

Paralaubuca s a genus of freshwater ray-finned fish belonging to the family Xenocyprididae, the East Asian minnows or sharpbellies. The species in this genus are found in Asia.

== Species ==
Paralaubuca contains the following species:

- Paralaubuca barroni (Fowler, 1934)
- Paralaubuca harmandi Sauvage, 1883
- Paralaubuca riveroi (Fowler, 1935)
- Paralaubuca typus Bleeker, 1864
