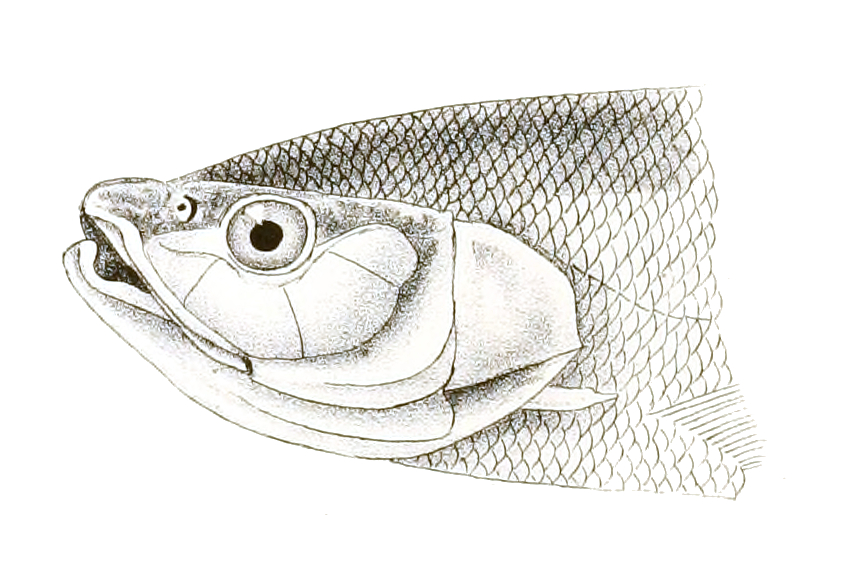

Conservation status
- Least Concern (IUCN 3.1)

Scientific classification
- Kingdom: Animalia
- Phylum: Chordata
- Class: Actinopterygii
- Order: Cypriniformes
- Family: Danionidae
- Subfamily: Chedrinae
- Genus: Securicula; Günther, 1868
- Species: S. gora

Binomial name
- Securicula gora (Hamilton, 1822)

Synonyms
- Cyprinus gora Hamilton, 1822; Chela gora (Hamilton, 1822); Oxygaster gora (Hamilton, 1822); Pseudoxygaster gora (Hamilton, 1822); Opsarius pholicephalus McClelland, 1839; Leuciscus cultellus Valenciennes, 1844

= Securicula =

Monotypic genus of fish

Securicula is a monospecific genus of freshwater ray-finned fish belonging to the family Danionidae, the danios or danionins. The only species in the genus is Securicula gora, a fish found in Bangladesh, India, Pakistan and possibly in Nepal.

== Description ==
'Sericula gora is a silvery fish with an upward pointing mouth, which has a prominent cartilagenous knob on the lower jaw, and a keel running along the abdomen from below the pectoral fin to the anal fin. The dorsal fin has its origin in front of that of the anal fin. The caudal fin has its lower lobe longer than the upper lobe and the pelvic fins has well developed axillary scales. There are 140-160 scales in the lateral line which is complete and decurved. It grows to a maximum length of 24.5cm.

== Distribution ==
Securicula gora is known to occur in the Ganges and Brahmaputra drainages of India, Bangladesh and Nepal. The presence of this species in the Punjab in India and Pakistan has not been confirmed.

== Habitat and ecology ==
Securicula gora is a pelagic, freshwater species which can be found in rivers, beels and canals. It is a predatory species which feeds on insects, insect larvae and crustaceans which it takes at or near the surface of the water. In 1988 a new species of monogenean parasite, Heteromazocraes mamaevi was described from specimens of S. gora sampled near Lucknow, until then this genus of parasites had been thought only to occur on members of the Clupeid family Engraulidae.

== Conservation and Human use ==
Securicula gora is a common and widespread species where it occurs and is thus treated as Least Concern by the IUCN but its habitat can be affected by silting caused by logging and consequent deforestation of the land surrounding the waters it inhabits.

This species is consumed as food in Bangladesh and other parts of it range where it is normally of minor interest to commercial fisheries, except in parts of India where it is commercially fished for.
