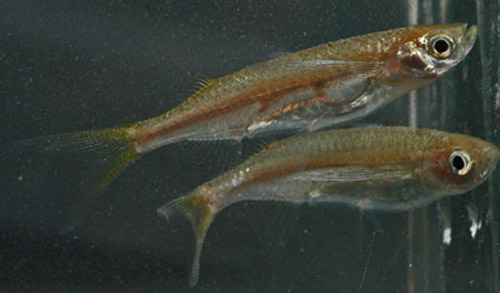

Conservation status
- Near Threatened (IUCN 3.1)

Scientific classification
- Kingdom: Animalia
- Phylum: Chordata
- Class: Actinopterygii
- Order: Cypriniformes
- Family: Xenocyprididae
- Genus: Parachela
- Species: P. cyanea

Binomial name
- Parachela cyanea Kottelat, 1995

= Parachela cyanea =

Species of fish

Parachela cyanea is a species of freshwater ray-finned fish belonging to the family Xenocyprididae, the East Asian minnows or sharpbellies. It inhabits Indonesian Borneo and has a maximum length of 4.9 centimetres (1.9 in). It is considered harmless to humans.
