= Parachela ingerkongi =

Conservation status
- Least Concern (IUCN 3.1)

Scientific classification
- Kingdom: Animalia
- Phylum: Chordata
- Class: Actinopterygii
- Order: Cypriniformes
- Family: Xenocyprididae
- Genus: Parachela
- Species: P. ingerkongi

Binomial name
- Parachela ingerkongi (Banarescu, 1969)

Synonyms
- Oxygaster oxygastroides ingerkongi Bănărescu, 1969

Species of fish

Parachela ingerkongi is a species of freshwater ray-finned fish belonging to the family Xenocyprididae, the East Asian minnows or sharpbellies. This species is endemic to north eastern Borneo where it lives in fast flowing streams and forest rivers.
