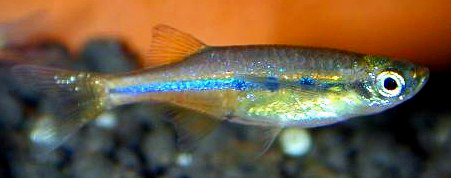

Conservation status
- Least Concern (IUCN 3.1)

Scientific classification
- Kingdom: Animalia
- Phylum: Chordata
- Class: Actinopterygii
- Order: Cypriniformes
- Family: Danionidae
- Subfamily: Danioninae
- Genus: Neochela; Silas, 1958
- Species: N. dadiburjori

Binomial name
- Neochela dadiburjori Menon, 1952

Synonyms
- Chela dadiburjori (Menon, 1952); Laubuka dadiburjori (Menon, 1952)

= Dadio =

Species of fish

The dadio (Neochela dadiburjori) is a species of freshwater ray-finned fish belonging to the family Danionidae, it is the only species in the monospecific genus Neochela. This species is rarely seen in the aquarist hobby but is not entirely unlike the Danio nigrofasciatus in appearance. Neochela dadiburjori is a gold/silver fish with a blue line, it has two colour morphs, one with a distinct blue line, the other with a dotted blue line. Barbels are not present. Like most danionins, this fish has a tendency to jump. A tight fitting lid with no gaps is recommended. Endemic in India, where both colour morphs co-exist, the fish is found from Tamil Nadu to Goa. It is necessary to avoid making it coexist with big fish which would only make a mouthful of it (killi: panchax, melanoteania boesmani...).
