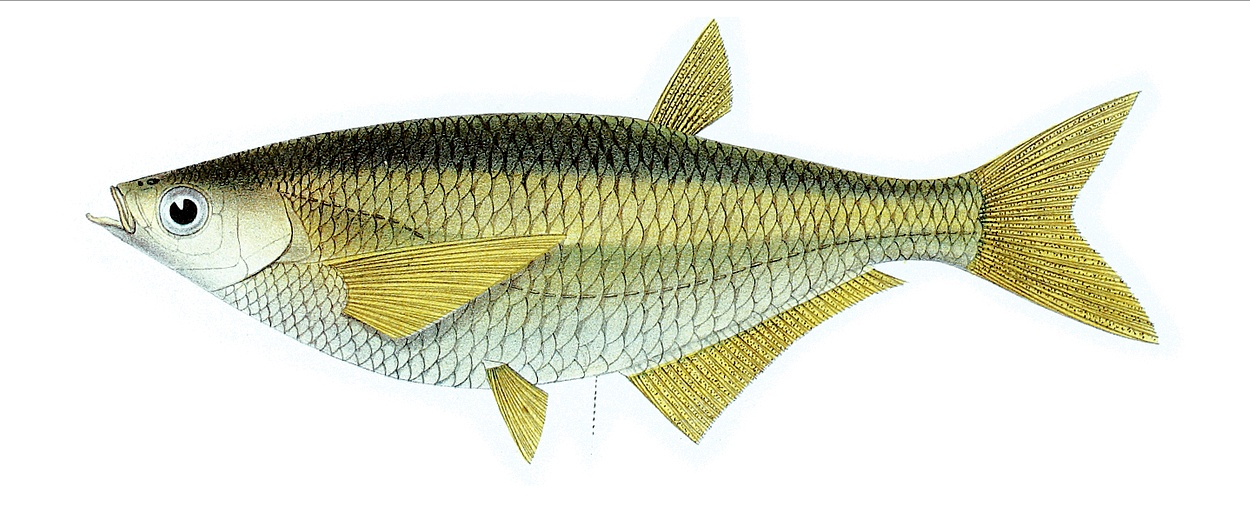
- Oxygaster anomlaura

Scientific classification
- Kingdom: Animalia
- Phylum: Chordata
- Class: Actinopterygii
- Order: Cypriniformes
- Family: Xenocyprididae
- Genus: Oxygaster van Hasselt, 1823

Type species
- Oxygaster anomalura van Hasselt, 1823

= Oxygaster =

Genus of fishes

Oxygaster is a genus of freshwater ray-finned fish belonging to the family Xenocyprididae, the East Asian minnows or sharpbellies. The species in this genus are found in Southeast Asia.

== Species ==
These are the currently recognized species in this genus:

- Oxygaster anomalura van Hasselt, 1823
- Oxygaster pointoni (Fowler, 1934)
