= Parachela maculicauda =

Conservation status
- Least Concern (IUCN 3.1)

Scientific classification
- Kingdom: Animalia
- Phylum: Chordata
- Class: Actinopterygii
- Order: Cypriniformes
- Family: Xenocyprididae
- Genus: Parachela
- Species: P. maculicauda

Binomial name
- Parachela maculicauda (Smith, 1934)

Synonyms
- Chela maculicauda H. M. Smith, 1934; Oxygaster maculicauda (H. M. Smith, 1934)

Species of fish

Parachela maculicauda is a species of freshwater ray-finned fish belonging to the family Xenocyprididae, the East Asian minnows or sharpbellies. It occurs in lowland rivers and swamps in small groups. Found at the water surface in small and medium-sized rivers with nearby areas of floodplain forest. Feeds on plankton. It is found in the basins of the Mekong River and Chao Praya as well as the Malay Peninsula and on the island of Sumatra and in Sarawak, it has also been possibly recorded from the Mae Klong It is a small fish growing to a maximum length of 6 cm and is characterised by two blotches near the tips of each lobe of the caudal fin. It is of limited interest in fisheries but is used to make prahok. It is also of little interest to the aquarium trade.
