= Paralaubuca barroni =

Conservation status
- Least Concern (IUCN 3.1)

Scientific classification
- Kingdom: Animalia
- Phylum: Chordata
- Class: Actinopterygii
- Order: Cypriniformes
- Suborder: Cyprinoidei
- Family: Xenocyprididae
- Genus: Paralaubuca
- Species: P. barroni

Binomial name
- Paralaubuca barroni (Fowler, 1934)

Synonyms
- Chela barroni Fowler, 1934

Species of fish

Paralaubuca barroni is a species of freshwater ray-finned fish from the family Xenocyprididae, the East Asian minnows or sharpbellies, from south east Asia. It occurs in the Mekong and Chao Praya drainages in China, Thailand, Cambodia, Myanmar, and Vietnam.
