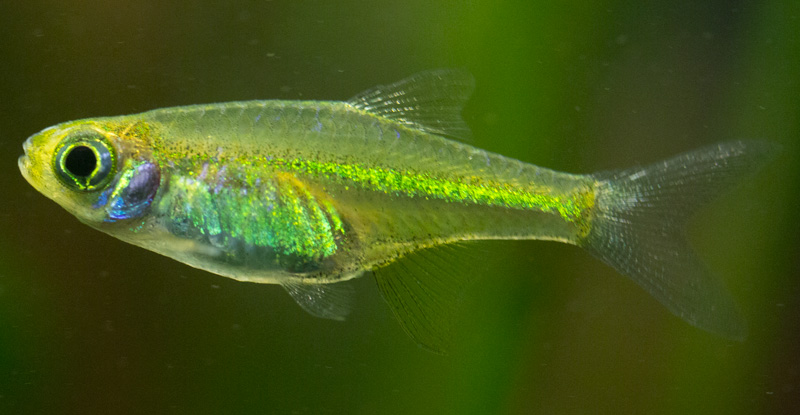

Conservation status
- Least Concern (IUCN 3.1)

Scientific classification
- Kingdom: Animalia
- Phylum: Chordata
- Class: Actinopterygii
- Order: Cypriniformes
- Family: Danionidae
- Subfamily: Danioninae
- Genus: Microdevario
- Species: M. kubotai

Binomial name
- Microdevario kubotai (Kottelat & K. E. Witte, 1999)

= Microdevario kubotai =

Species of fish

Microdevario kubotai, the kubotai rasbora, is a species of freshwater ray-finned fish belonging to family Danionidae. This species is found in southeast Asian rivers and streams. It belongs to the genus Microdevario, which contains small danionins. The type locality is in Ranong Province, Peninsular Thailand. It is also known from the adjacent Phang Nga Province and the Ataran basin in Myanmar. It likely occurs elsewhere in the region and an introduced population exists in the Songgaria River (part of the Khwae Noi basin). It reaches up to 1.9 cm (0.75 in) in standard length.

In the aquarium fish trade, it is often identified as the "yellow neon" or "green neon" rasbora.
