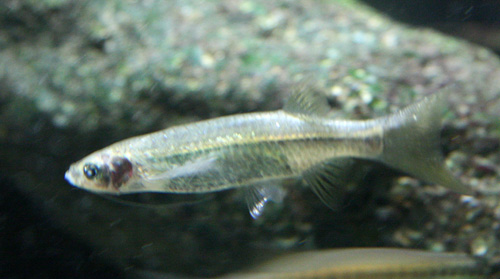
- Esomus metallicus

Scientific classification
- Kingdom: Animalia
- Phylum: Chordata
- Class: Actinopterygii
- Order: Cypriniformes
- Family: Danionidae
- Subfamily: Esominae; Tan & Armbruster, 2018
- Genus: Esomus; Swainson, 1839

Type species
- Esomus vittatus Swainson, 1839

Species
- See text

= Esomus =

Genus of fishes

Esomus, or flying barbs, is a genus of freshwater ray-finned fish belonging to the family Danionidae. It is the only genus in the monotypic subfamily Esominae. The fishes in this genus are found in South and Mainland Southeast Asia. They are distinctive for their extremely long barbels.

== Species ==
Esomus contains the following species:

- Esomus ahli Hora & Mukerji, 1928 (Burmese flying barb)
- Esomus altus (Blyth, 1860)
- Esomus bengalensis Bhakat & Sinha, 2020
- Esomus caudiocellatus Ahl, 1924
- Esomus danrica (Hamilton, 1822) (Indian flying barb)
- Esomus longimanus (Lunel, 1881) (Mekong flying barb)
- Esomus malayensis (Matte & Reichelt, 1908) (Malayan flying barb)
- Esomus metallicus Ahl, 1924
- Esomus thermoicos (Valenciennes, 1842)
