= Parachela hypophthalmus =

Conservation status
- Least Concern (IUCN 3.1)

Scientific classification
- Kingdom: Animalia
- Phylum: Chordata
- Class: Actinopterygii
- Order: Cypriniformes
- Family: Xenocyprididae
- Genus: Parachela
- Species: P. hypophthalmus

Binomial name
- Parachela hypophthalmus (Bleeker, 1860)

Synonyms
- Chela hypophthalmus Bleeker, 1860; Oxygaster hypophthalmus (Bleeker 1860); Parachela breitensteinii Steindachner, 1881

Species of fish

Parachela hypophthalmus is a species of freshwater ray-finned fish belonging to the family Xenocyprididae, the East Asian minnows or sharpbellies. It inhabits Thailand, Malaysia and Indonesia, in Sumatra and Borneo and has a maximum length of 16.5 centimetres (6.5 in). It has been assessed as least concern by the IUCN, and is considered harmless to humans.
