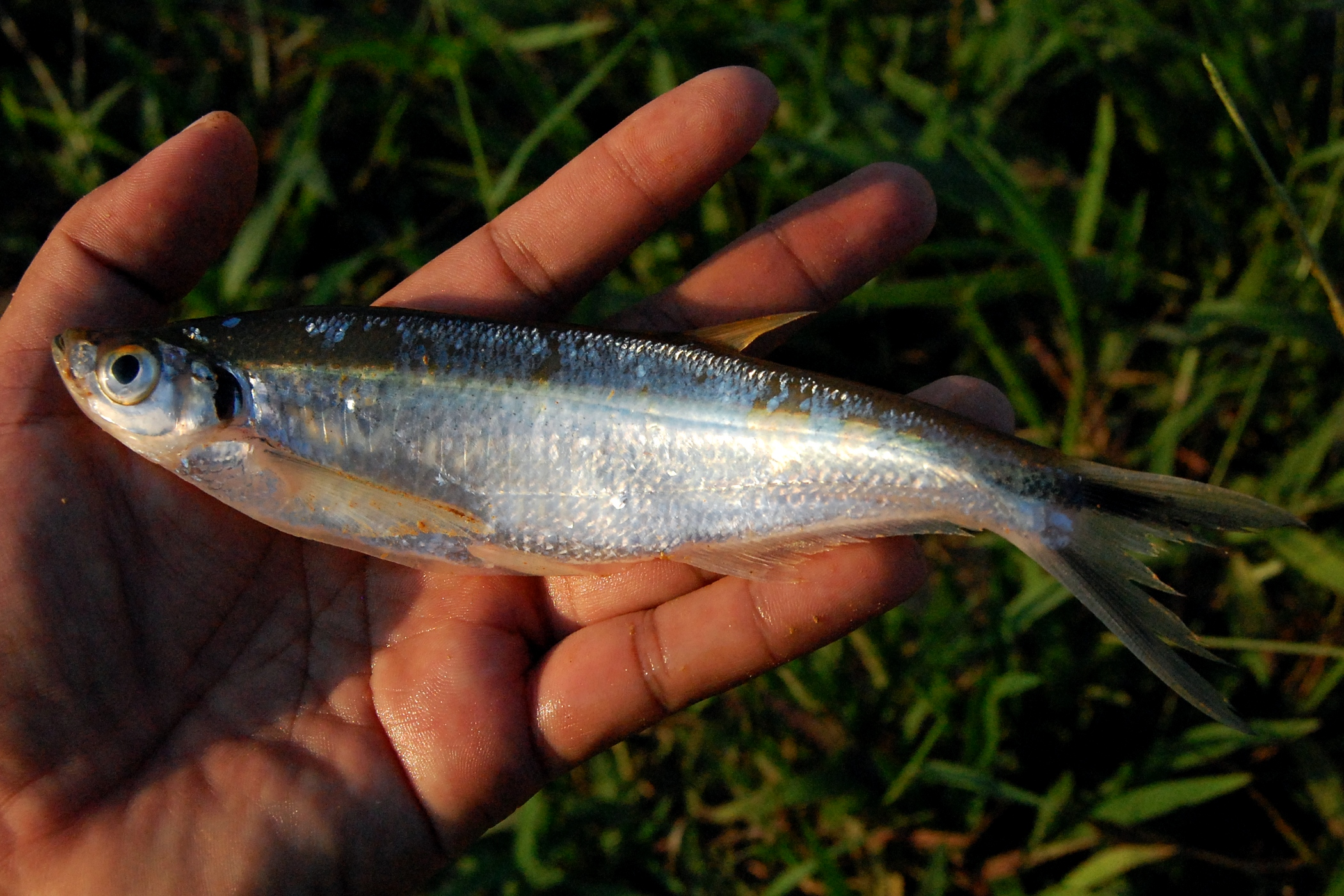
- Oxygaster anomalura from West Kutai Regency, East Kalimantan, Indonesia

Conservation status
- Least Concern (IUCN 3.1)

Scientific classification
- Domain: Eukaryota
- Kingdom: Animalia
- Phylum: Chordata
- Class: Actinopterygii
- Order: Cypriniformes
- Suborder: Cyprinoidei
- Family: Xenocyprididae
- Genus: Oxygaster
- Species: O. anomalura

Binomial name
- Oxygaster anomalura van Hasselt, 1823

Synonyms
- Chela anomalurus (Van Hasselt, 1823); Cyprinus oxygaster Valenciennes, 1844; Chela oxygaster (Valenciennes, 1844); Leuciscus oxygaster (Valenciennes, 1844); Oxygaster oxygaster (Valenciennes, 1844)

= Oxygaster anomalura =

Species of fish

Oxygaster anomalura are medium-sized freshwater fishes in the family Xenocyprididae, that can reach up to 200 mm SL(standard length), and are found near the surface in small- to medium-sized rivers in Southeast Asia, where they live off a diet of invertebrates.

== Rivers in Southeast Asia ==
There are many rivers that run throughout Southeast Asia. In Malaysia, there is the Batang Kerang floodplain, which is located in Balai Ringin, Sarawak and is home to many species of fish including Oxygaster anomalura. In Batang Kerang, there are streams that are shaded by canopy vegetation. They have developed steep, muddy banks that have been affected by the frequent rise and fall of water levels. Areas where swamps or peaty soils develop, the waters can be seen as heavily colored. These dark, colored streams are commonly known as black water streams or rivers. Black water rivers are typically highly acidic, with pH ranging from 3.6 - 5.9, with low dissolved organic and suspended solids. When observed with transmitted light, the river gives off a tea color. It gives off a black color when seen with reflected light.

Besides black water rivers, there are also brown rivers in Batang Kerang. These rivers are often brown and muddy due to its high sediment contents. Some areas of the brown water are marked by extensive floating vegetation.

== Freshwater fish in Batang Kerang ==
Research had been done before with there being studies of spatial and temporal patterns of diversity, distribution and species composition of freshwater fishes. These studies helped examine factors influencing the structure of the fish community (Belliard et al., 1997; Galactosa et al., 2004). However much of these studies occurred in other locations in the world, most notably, in the Amazon River. Between September 2004, and January 2005, researchers investigated the freshwater fish diversity and composition in the brown and black water rivers of Batang Kerang.

To conduct this study, the researchers focused on several factors that could have affected the outcome. Among the factors were pH, temperature (°C), and dissolved oxygen concentration.

The results of their study showed that a total of 234 individual fish from 36 species and 13 families were collected. Both the black and brown water habitats showed different fish species compositions. In the brown water, a total of 152 fish from among 32 species were caught, with 25 being exclusive to the habitat. The fish in the brown water were primarily made up of the family Cyprinidae. Oxygaster anomalura was the most abundant fish collected. Meanwhile, in the black water river, 82 individual fish from 12 species were caught. The most abundant fish caught was the Helostoma temminckii. During this study, only seven species of families were found in both habitats. This list included Oxygaster anomalura.
