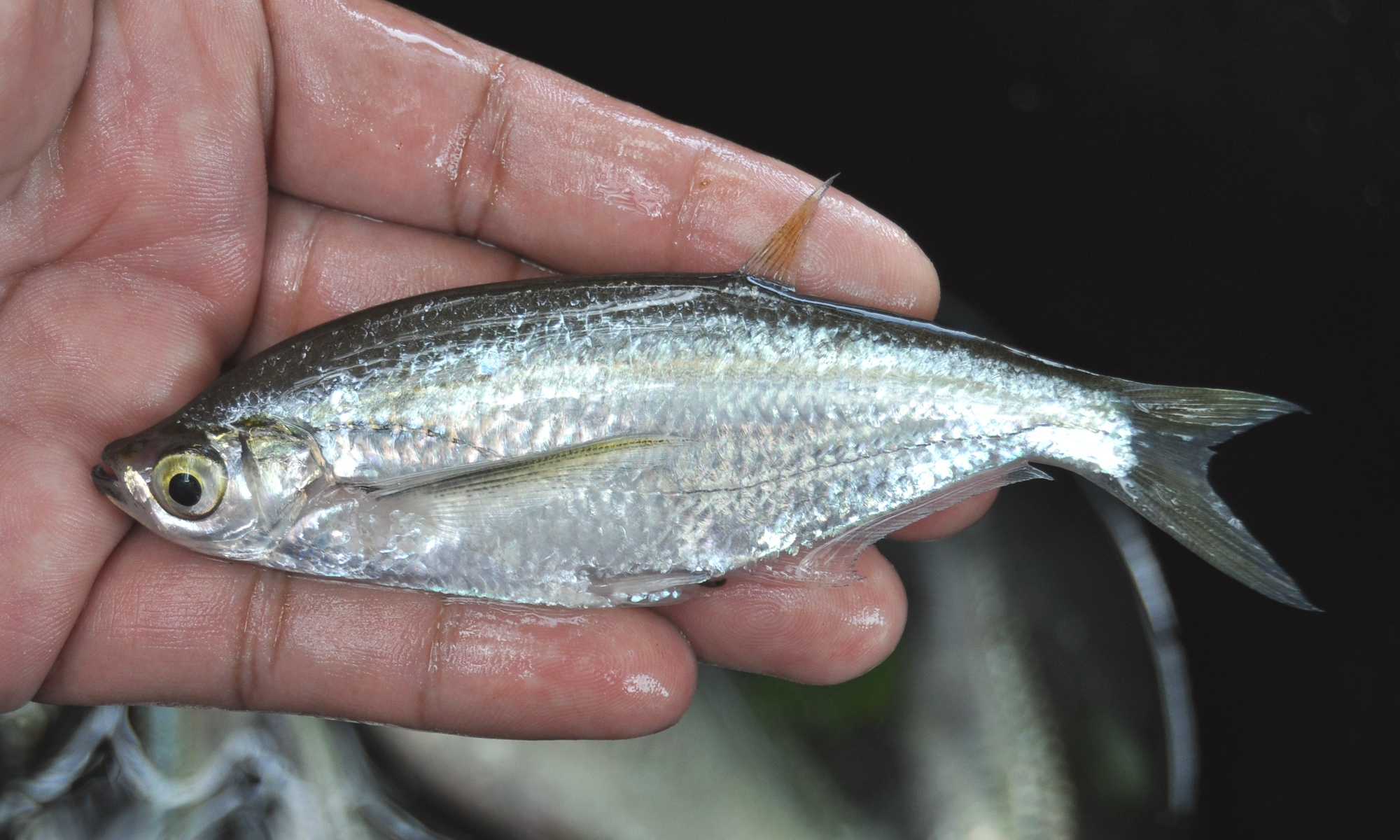

Conservation status
- Least Concern (IUCN 3.1)

Scientific classification
- Kingdom: Animalia
- Phylum: Chordata
- Class: Actinopterygii
- Order: Cypriniformes
- Family: Xenocyprididae
- Genus: Parachela
- Species: P. oxygastroides

Binomial name
- Parachela oxygastroides (Bleeker, 1852)

Synonyms
- Chela oxygastroides (Bleeker, 1852); Leuciscus oxygastroides Bleeker, 1852; Oxygaster oxygastroides (Bleeker, 1852); Chela megalolepis Günther, 1868

= Parachela oxygastroides =

Species of fish

Parachela oxygastroides, also known as the glass fish, is a species of freshwater ray-finned fish belonging to the family Xenocyprididae, the East Asian minnows or sharpbellies. It is found in Southeast Asia in rivers and wetlands, including seasonally flooded forests. Of length 10–20 cm, it is caught commercially for food and sold in markets; it is one of the species used in Cambodian cuisine to make the fish paste prahok.
