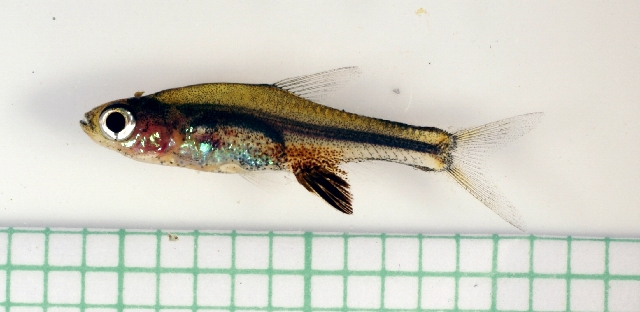
- Sundadanio axelrodi

Scientific classification
- Kingdom: Animalia
- Phylum: Chordata
- Class: Actinopterygii
- Order: Cypriniformes
- Suborder: Cyprinoidei
- Family: Sundadanionidae; Mayden & W. J. Chen, 2010
- Genus: Sundadanio; Kottelat & K. E. Witte, 1999

Type species
- Rasbora axelrodi Brittan, 1976

= Sundadanio =

Genus of fishes

Sundadanio is a genus of freshwater ray-finned fishes and it is one of two genera in the family Sundadanionidae, known as the tiny danios. These fishes are typically found in peat swamps and blackwater streams, in Borneo and Sumatra (as well as nearby smaller islands) in southeast Asia. At up to 2.3 cm (0.91 in) in standard length they are very small, but still larger than their close relatives Paedocypris. Species of the two genera are often found together.

== Species ==
There are currently eight recognized species in this genus:

- Sundadanio atomus Conway, Kottelat & H. H. Tan, 2011
- Sundadanio axelrodi (Brittan, 1976)
- Sundadanio echinus Conway, Kottelat & Tan, 2011
- Sundadanio gargula Conway, Kottelat & Tan, 2011
- Sundadanio goblinus Conway, Kottelat & Tan, 2011
- Sundadanio margarition Conway, Kottelat & Tan, 2011
- Sundadanio retiarius Conway, Kottelat & Tan, 2011
- Sundadanio rubellus Conway, Kottelat & Tan, 2011
