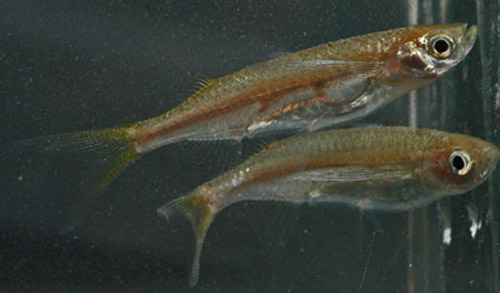
- Parachela cyanea

Scientific classification
- Kingdom: Animalia
- Phylum: Chordata
- Class: Actinopterygii
- Division: Teleostei
- Order: Cypriniformes
- Family: Xenocyprididae
- Genus: Parachela; Steindachner, 1881

Type species
- Parachela breitensteinii Steindachner, 1881

Synonyms
- Grandisquamachela Fowler, 1934

= Parachela (fish) =

Genus of fishes

Parachela is a genus of freshwater ray-finned fish belonging to the family Xenocyprididae, the East Asian minnows or sharpbellies. These fishes are found in Asia.

== Species ==
These are the currently recognized species in this genus:

- Parachela cyanea Kottelat, 1995
- Parachela hypophthalmus (Bleeker, 1860)
- Parachela ingerkongi (Bănărescu, 1969)
- Parachela johorensis Steindachner, 1870
- Parachela maculicauda (H. M. Smith, 1934)
- Parachela oxygastroides (Bleeker, 1852) (Glass fish)
- Parachela siamensis (Günther, 1868)
- Parachela williaminae Fowler, 1934
- Parachela melanosticta Page, Tangjitjaroen, Limpichat, Randall, Boyd, Tongnunui, and Pfeiffer, 2024
- Parachela microlepis Page, Tangjitjaroen, Limpichat, Randall, Boyd, Tongnunui, and Pfeiffer, 2024
