= Parachela williaminae =

Conservation status
- Least Concern (IUCN 3.1)

Scientific classification
- Kingdom: Animalia
- Phylum: Chordata
- Class: Actinopterygii
- Order: Cypriniformes
- Family: Xenocyprididae
- Genus: Parachela
- Species: P. williaminae

Binomial name
- Parachela williaminae Fowler, 1934

Species of fish

Parachela williaminae is a species of freshwater ray-finned fish belonging to the family Xenocyprididae, the East Asian minnows or sharpbellies. It inhabits Thailand, Cambodia and Laos. It has a maximum length of 12 centimetres (4.7 in) and is used for food locally. It has been assessed as "least concern" on the IUCN Red List and is considered harmless to humans.
