= Fang Fang Kullander =

Swedish-Chinese ichthyologist

Fang Fang Kullander, née Fang Fang, (14 November 1962 – 19 May 2010) was a Swedish-Chinese ichthyologist.

== Early life ==
Fang Fang was born on 14 November 1962 in Beijing, her parents were Fang Zongxian and Hang Mingzhen, both geologists. Fang Fang attended primary school in Beijing from 1969 but the family was forced to move to Sanmenxia in Henan and then to Fenghua in Zhejiang, her father's home town, during the Cultural Revolution when her parents' institute was compelled to move out of the capital. She excelled at languages and at writing, her talent for the latter emerging at middle school in Sanmexia.

== Education ==
Fang Fang entered the Zhanjiang Fisheries College in Guangdong in 1980 where she majored in the study of freshwater fish, graduating in 1984 with her Bachelor's thesis being about the anatomy of the catfish Clarias lazera. This thesis was awarded the second prize of the Scientific and Technological Advancement by the Chinese Agriculture ministry in 1986. She studied for her postgraduate degree, a M.Sc. at the Department of Biology Hebei University and she obtained her M.Sc. in 1987 her thesis was about the early development of the salmonid Brachymystax lenok. While at Hebei University she worked as a graduate assistant and associate lecturer.

== Career ==
After obtaining her M.Sc. Fang Fang worked at the Chinese Academy of Sciences as a research associate in the Division of Ichthyology in Beijing. While there she undertook extensive field work, studying fish in a number of Chinese rivers. She also assisted Professor Li Sizhong in conducting a review of the distribution of the important Chinese carp species. It was during her time at the Chinese Academy of Sciences that she first travelled to Sweden, working for three months from October 1992 as a visiting scientist at the Swedish Museum of Natural History under a scholarship supported by the Royal Swedish Academy of Engineering Sciences and the Chinese Academy of Science. During this stay she mainly worked on the sorting and identification of the collection of freshwater fish from Sri Lanka, most of which actually came from the Museum of Zoology at Lund University.

This work led Fang Fang to submit a proposal to carry out a Ph.D. revising the cyprinid genus Danio at the Department of Zoology at Stockholm University, which was accepted in 1993. She was granted laboratory space at the Swedish Museum of Natural History and in 1996 she obtained a full Ph.D. position. While studying for her Ph.D. she travelled widely to South America and south Asia, and even returned to China to collect specimens in Yunnan. She completed her Ph.D., Phylogeny and species diversity of the South and Southeast Asian cyprinid genus Danio Hamilton (Teleostei, Cyprinidae) in 2000.

After completing her Ph.D. she worked for the European Union funded ECOCARP project searching for new species which could be used for aquaculture in China, this lasted from 2001 to 2003. Following this she worked for the Swedish Fishbase team and she was secretary of the European Ichthyological Association from 2004 up to 2009. She was also a member of the Japanese Ichthyological Society, the American Society of Ichthyologists and Herpetologists, the Sveriges Fiskforskares Förening (the "Swedish Fisheries Association"), the Chinese Society of Ichthyologists, and the Chinese Society of Zoologists.

== Personal life ==
Fang Fang had one son from her first marriage, Tiantian Kullander, whom later became the co-founder of Amber Group, a digital asset services company. She married the Swedish ichthyologist Sven O. Kullander in 1993, taking his surname as her married name but retaining her own surname as her middle name, and they had a son Johan Bernard Didi in 1999. In 2009 she was diagnosed with gall duct cancer and she died on 19 May 2010 in Sweden.

Although she worked as an ichthyologist she had many interests and trained as a singer both in China and in Sweden, she participated in the Chinese choir in Stockholm and was an active member of Stockholm's Chinese community. She continued to write stories in Chinese and many of them were published online.

== Taxon named in her honor ==
Fang Fang Kullander is commemorated and honoured for her contribution to the knowledge of the freshwater fish fauna of Myanmar in the specific name of the danionin Devario fangae, the first specimens of which were collected by her in Myanmar and she suggested they may be a new species, although it was not formally described as such until 2017. Alburnoides fangfangae, a cyprinid endemic to Albania, was also named in her honour in 2010 as was the monotypic danionin genus from Borneo, Fangfangia in 2011.

== Taxon described by her ==
- See Category:Taxa named by Fang Fang Kullander

In addition, the following species are among those she described:

- Devario maetaengensis (Fang, 1997)
- Danio kyathit Fang, 1998
- Devario apopyris (Fang & Kottelat, 1999)
- Devario leptos (Fang & Kottelat, 1999)
- Devario acrostomus (Fang & Kottelat, 1999)
- Danio roseus Fang & Kottelat, 2000
- Danio aesculapii Kullander & Fang, 2009
- Danio quagga Kullander, Liao & Fang, 2009
- Danio tinwini Kullander & Fang, 2009
- Devario xyrops Fang & Kullander, 2009
