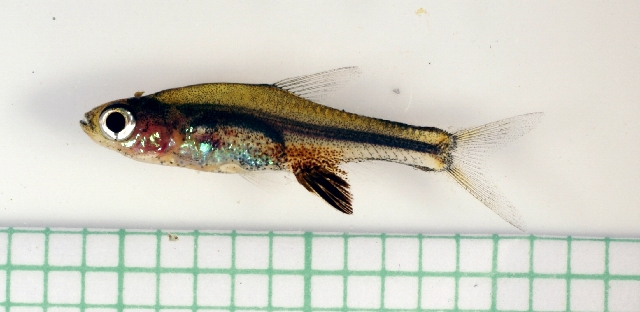
- Sundadanio axelrodi

Scientific classification
- Kingdom: Animalia
- Phylum: Chordata
- Class: Actinopterygii
- Order: Cypriniformes
- Suborder: Cyprinoidei
- Family: Sundadanionidae; Mayden & W. J. Chen, 2010

= Sundadanionidae =

Family of fishes

Sundadanionidae, the tiny danios, is a family of freshwater ray-finned fishes belongong to the suborder Cyprinoidei of the order Cypriniformes. The fishes in this family are endemic to Indonesia.

== Genera ==
Sundadanionidae contains the following genera:

- Fangfangia Britz, Kottelat & Tan, 2012
- Sundadanio Kottelat & K. E. Witte, 1999
