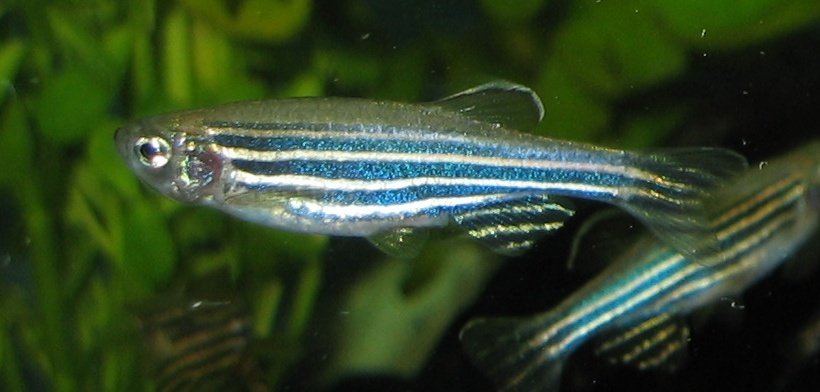
- Danio rerio — zebra danio

Scientific classification
- Kingdom: Animalia
- Phylum: Chordata
- Class: Actinopterygii
- Division: Teleostei
- Order: Cypriniformes
- Suborder: Cyprinoidei
- Family: Danionidae; Bleeker 1863

Genera
- 'see text

= Danionin =

Danionin Temporal range: Eocene–present

Family of fishes

The danionins are a group of small, slender "minnow-type" pelagic freshwater fish in the family Danionidae of the suborder Cyprinoidei. Species of this group are in the genera clades Danio and Devario (which also includes Chela, Laubuka, Microdevario, and Microrasbora genera), based on the latest phylogenetic research by Fang et al in 2009.

They are primarily native to shallow freshwater ponds, streams, floodplains, marshes and paddies of South and Southeast Asia, with fewer species in Africa. Many species are brightly coloured and are available as aquarium fish worldwide. Fishes of the Danio clade tend to have horizontal striping, rows of spots, or vertical bars, and often have long barbels. Species within the Devario clade tend to have vertical or horizontal bars, and short, rudimentary barbels, if present at all.

All danionins are egg scatterers, and time their reproduction during the monsoon season in the wild. They are opportunistic feeders, living on a variety of tiny insects, crustaceans, plankton and other microorganisms and invertebrates.

== Fossil record ==
Two fossil danionins, tentatively assigned to Rasbora ('Rasbora' antiqua and 'Rasbora' mohri) are known from the Eocene of Sumatra, Indonesia, representing the earliest record of the group.

== Danionin species ==
=== Common names ===
Since 2004, many new danionins have been discovered, which do not yet have scientific names and many other species, previously known only to the scientific fraternity, have become available in aquarist shops. This has predictably led to total confusion as to the naming of some fish, with some species having up to five different common names in use and some common names being used for up to four different species.

=== Scientific names ===
Individual danionin species are listed within the relevant pages for each genus, but many danionin species have been changed into different genera over the last decades, in some cases repeatedly; similarly, some species have been synonymised with other species and in some cases later unsynonymised, all of which has caused confusion.

== List of genera ==
- Subfamily Chedrinae Bleeker, 1863 (troutbarbs)
  - Barilius Hamilton, 1822
  - Bengala Gray, 1834
  - Cabdio Hamilton, 1822
  - Chelaethiops Boulenger, 1899
  - Engraulicypris Günther, 1894
  - Leptocypris Boulenger, 1900
  - Luciosoma Bleeker, 1855
  - Malayochela Bănărescu, 1968
  - Nematabramis Boulenger, 1894
  - Neobola Vinciguerra, 1895
  - Opsaridium Peters, 1854
  - Opsarius McClelland, 1838
  - Raiamas D. S. Jordan, 1919
  - Rastrineobola Fowler, 1936
  - Salmostoma Swainson, 1839
  - Securicula Günther, 1868
  - Thryssocypris Roberts & Kottelat, 1984
- Subfamily Rasborinae Günther, 1868 (rasborines)
  - Amblypharyngodon Bleeker, 1860 (Carplets)
  - Boraras Kottelat & Vidthayanon, 1993
  - Brevibora T. Y. Liao, S. O. Kullander & F. Fang, 2010
  - Horadandia Deraniyagala, 1943
  - Kottelatia T. Y. Liao, S. O. Kullander & F. Fang, 2010
  - Pectenocypris Kottelat, 1982
  - Rasbora Bleeker, 1859
  - Rasboroides Brittan, 1954
  - Rasbosoma Liao, Kullander & Fang, 2010
  - Trigonopoma T. Y. Liao, S. O. Kullander & F. Fang, 2010
  - Trigonostigma Kottelat & Witte, 1999
- Subfamily Danioninae Bleeker, 1863 (danionines)
  - Betadevario P. K. Pramod, F. Fang, Rema Devi, T. Y. Liao, T. J. Indra, K. S. Jameela Beevi & S. O. Kullander, 2010
  - Chela Hamilton, 1822
  - Danio Hamilton, 1822
  - Danionella Roberts, 1986
  - Devario Heckel, 1843
  - Inlecypris Howes, 1980
  - Laubuka Bleeker, 1859
  - Microdevario F. Fang, Norén, T. Y. Liao, Källersjö & S. O. Kullander, 2009
  - Microrasbora Annandale, 1918
  - Neochela Silas, 1958
- Subfamily Esominae Tan & Armbruster, 2018 (flying barbs)
  - Esomus Swainson, 1839

== In the aquarium ==
They are generally active swimmers, occupying the top half of a tank and eat just about any type of aquarium food. They will not, however, generally eat plants or algae. Although boisterous and liable to chase each other and other fish, they are good community fish and do not generally attack each other or other fish. They do occasionally nip fins, and like most fish, eat eggs and any fish small enough to fit into their mouths.

These fish are easily stressed by flowing water and bright light. They occur in stagnant water with pH values between 3 and 5 caused by peat, which accumulates from a dense canopy. Generally, this also results in them being subtropical with temperatures of 20 to 22 °C (68 to 72 °F) often being fine. They are good jumpers, so a tight-fitting lid is recommended.

== Taxonomy ==
The grouping of fish now deemed danionins has been the subject of constant research and speculation throughout the 20th century. Nearly all the fish classed within the genera Danio and Devario were originally placed in the genus Danio upon discovery. However, in the first part of the 20th century, George S. Myers split them into three genera, Danio, Brachydanio, and Daniops. The sole species within Myers' Daniops, D. myersi, has long ago been found to be a synonym of Devario laoensis, but his genus Brachydanio lasted for much longer, as it included most of the fish now classed as Danio, whereas Danio included most of the fish now classed as Devario.

However, Danio dangila and Danio feegradei, both of which had most of the characteristics of the Brachydanio (with the exception that they were much larger than Brachydanio species) were placed within Danios. (Due to this and other misplacing, both Danio and Brachydanio were found to be paraphyletic by Fang Fang in 2003.). In 1941, H.M. Smith attempted to unite all the Brachydanios and Danios species into one genus on the basis of a fish from Thailand, which was supposed to bridge the gap. He downgraded both Danio and Brachydanio into subgenera and erected a new subgenus of Allodanio with one member, Allodanio ponticulus, but Myers later pointed out that A. ponticulus was actually a member of the genus Barilius.

The danionin group was thought to include Parabarilius, Danio, Brachydanio, and Danionella. In this scheme, danionins were distinguished from other cyprinids by the uniquely shared character of the "danionin notch", a large and peculiarly shaped indentation in the medial margin of the mandibles; this feature is not noted in rasborins, esomins, bariliins, or chelins. However, all of these categories at that time were informal. Microrasbora was not considered to be a part of the danionins, nor even closely related to Danionella, a part of the danionins as understood at that time.

In the late 1980s and 1990s, doubts grew about the validity of Brachydanio, with species being referred to their original naming of Danio, and Fang Fang determined that the genus Danio, recognized up to that point, was paraphyletic. Fang Fang restricted Danio to the species in the "D. dangila species group", which at the time comprised nine species, including D. dangila, D. rerio, D. nigrofasciatus, and D. albolineatus; the remaining Danio species were moved to Devario, which at this time included D. malabaricus, D. kakhienensis, D. devario, D. chrysotaeniatus, D. maetaengensis, D. interruptus, and D. apogon.

The only Danio species to have been consistently called Danio were D. dangila and D. feegradei. As D. dangila was the first discovered Danio (or type) the name Danio had to remain with D. dangila, which is why the vast majority of species were moved to Devario.

Also, the sister group to Devario was deemed to be a clade formed by Inlecypris and Chela, and more controversially, Esomus was found to be the sister group of Danio. The relationships of Sundadanio, Danionella, and Microrasbora remained unresolved. The danionin notch was found to not supported to be a danionin synapomorphy.

In another paper, Celestichthys margaritatus was described as a new species of the Danioninae. Apparently, it is most closely related to Microrasbora erythromicron; the other Microrasbora species differ significantly from Celestichthys. The genus is identified as a danionin due specializations of its lower jaw and its numerous anal fin rays. Though it lacks a danionin notch, Celestichthys exhibits the "danionin mandibular knob", a bony process on the side of the mandible behind the danionin notch or where the notch should be; it is perhaps diagnostic of danionins. This knob is better developed in males than females. The fish of Rasborinae almost invariably have anal fins with three spines and five rays. Celestichthys has three anal fin spines and 8–10 anal fin rays. Also, rasborins have the generalized cyprinid principal caudal fin ray count of 10/9, while all Asian cyprinids with fewer than 10/9 principal caudal fin rays are all diminutive species of Danioninae, including Celestichthys, M. erythromicron, Danionella, and Paedocypris.

In 2007, an analysis of the phylogenetic relationships of the recently described genus Paedocypris was published, placing it as the sister taxon to Sundadanio. The clade formed by these two genera was found to be sister to a clade including many danionin genera, as well as some rasborin genera such as Rasbora, Trigonostigma, and Boraras, making the danionin group paraphyletic without these rasborin genera based on these results. This paper considered the danionin genera to be within a larger Rasborinae.

Also in 2007, another study analyzed the relationships of Danio. These authors considered Rasborinae to have priority over Danioninae, suggesting that they have the same meaning. Also, Danio was found to be the sister group of a clade including Chela, Microrasbora, Devario, and Inlecypris, rather than in a clade exclusively with either Devario or Esomus as in previous studies. This paper supported the close relationship of "Microrasbora" erythromicron to Danio species; however, this study did not include Celestichthys, which was noted by Roberts as being likely to include Erythromicron, but with further research needed.

In 2009 and 2010, detailed mitochondrial and nuclear DNA analyses of the phylogenetic interrelationships of the danionins were published by Fang et al (Zoologica Scripta, 38, 3, 2009) and Tang et al (Molecular Phylogenetics and Evolution 57, 2010). These two significant studies confirmed or established several taxonomic standings: The Danionin Tribe (of the Cyprinid Sub-family, Danioninae) were reduced to 3 clades - danio (Danio and Danioella genera), devario (Devario, Chela, Laubuka, Microdevario genera), and a combined esomus/paedocypris/sundadanio genera clade. Rasbora and related genera were excluded. The aquarium popular Celestial Pearl Danio / Galaxy Rasbora was confirmed as Danio margaritatus, being most closely related to D. erythromicron, and next to D.choprae. Within the devario clade, Microdevario was erected for all but one of the former Microrasboras. There is still uncertainty over the exact relationships for the three miniature taxa: Danionella, Paedocypris, and Sundadanio as all three have shown variability in phylogenetic position among different studies, both molecular and morphological.

Tanichthys is often regarded as a danionin by aquarists and grouped as such in some older aquatic publications, but no scientific basis exists for this, a fact stated on numerous occasions by Brittan and others. It is more closely related to the Rasbora species. The danionins can be classed as a subfamily Danioninae which is increasingly gaining credibility as a subfamily distinct from the Rasboriniae within the family Cyprinidae. However, in Nelson, 2006, Danioninae was listed as a synonym of Rasborinae. However, neither inter- nor intrarelationships among the "rasborins" has as yet been thoroughly analyzed.

A number of the species have only been recently discovered, in remote inland areas of Laos and Myanmar, and do not yet have scientific names. They are listed as Danio or Devario sp "xxxx" within the relevant genera and disambiguation pages.
