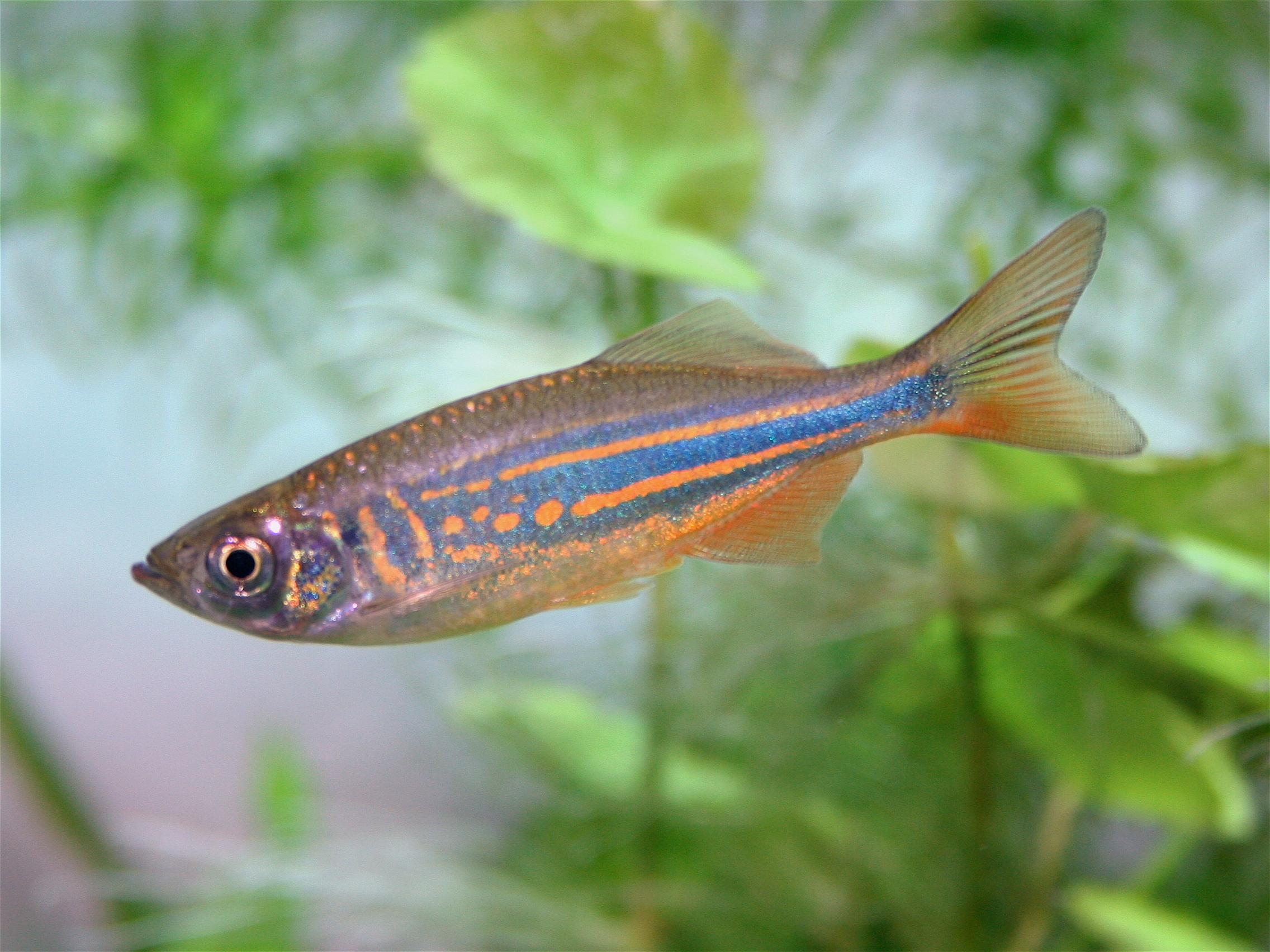

Conservation status
- Least Concern (IUCN 3.1)

Scientific classification
- Kingdom: Animalia
- Phylum: Chordata
- Class: Actinopterygii
- Order: Cypriniformes
- Family: Danionidae
- Subfamily: Danioninae
- Genus: Devario
- Species: D. aequipinnatus

Binomial name
- Devario aequipinnatus (McClelland, 1839)

Synonyms
- Perilampus ostreographus McClelland, 1839; Devario ostreographus (McClelland 1839); Leuciscus lineolatus Blyth, 1858; Devario cyanotaenia Bleeker, 1860

= Giant danio =

Species of fish

The giant danio (Devario aequipinnatus) is a species of freshwater ray-finned fish in the family Danionidae, native to parts of South and Southeast Asia. With a maximum length of about 15 cm (5.9 in), it is one of the largest species in the family. It may be found in the aquarium trade.

== Taxonomy and etymology ==
The giant danio belongs to the large danionin genus Devario. Its specific epithet is a combination of the Latin adjectives aequalis and pinnatus, meaning "equal" and "finned" respectively. This is a reference to the fact that the dorsal and anal fins of this species are symmetric.

Several other species in the genus, including D. affinis, D. browni, D. malabaricus (the Malabar danio), and D. strigillifer, were once deemed as synonyms of the giant danio, but are now valid species. One may find fish labelled as "golden giant danio" in the aquarium trade; this is not a separate species, but merely a partial albino giant danio.

== Description ==
The giant danio can grow up to 10–15 cm (3.9–5.9 in), making it one of the largest danionins. It is characterized by a blue and yellow, torpedo-shaped body with gray and clear fins. Females are larger than males and possess a more rounded abdomen.

== Distribution and habitat ==
The giant danio is native to the Indian subcontinent (including Sri Lanka) and most of Indochina, with a range running from Pakistan to Cambodia. Within these areas, this species is found in fast-flowing streams, usually in hilly areas, at elevations up to 300 m (980 ft). It prefers shaded and clear water with the following characteristics:

- with gravel or sand bottom;
- pH between 6.0 and 8.0;
- hardness between 5 and 19 dGH;
- temperature between 22–27 °C (72–81 °F).

== Diet ==
As surface dwellers, the diet of the giant danio consists predominantly of exogenous insects; this is supplemented by aquatic invertebrates such as worms and crustaceans. In captivity, the giant danio accepts most foods, including mosquito larvae, chironomous larvae, white worms, chopped earth worms, and commercially available pet food.

== Reproduction ==
Males interested in spawning chase females would ram into their abdomens with their heads. The giant danio is an egg scatterer, and females produce around 300 eggs in a single spawning in clumps of plants. Juveniles begin to resemble their adult form after around 65 days of development.

Giant danio breeding can be induced in captivity by increasing water temperature and creating artificial rain.

== In the aquarium ==
The giant danio has become an extremely popular aquarium fish over the decades: its flashy coloration combined with an active swimming style has enticed many aquarists to include it in their displays. As the giant danio is a shoaling fish in its natural habitat, having 6 or more (ideally 8-10) giant danios in a tank will bring out their most natural behaviors. It is somewhat aggressive, and may bully other fish in community tanks. It is recommended that this species be kept in a tank that is at least 1.2 m (3.9 ft) long with ample open swimming spaces and with a secure lid (since this species is known to be a jumper). The average lifespan of this species in captivity is 5-7 years.

=== As dither fish ===
The giant danio may be used as dither fish in South and Central American cichlid aquaria. The larger cichlids chase and defend their territories against the giant danios, allowing them to exhibit more natural behavior.
