= Devario myitkyinae =

Scientific classification
- Kingdom: Animalia
- Phylum: Chordata
- Class: Actinopterygii
- Order: Cypriniformes
- Family: Danionidae
- Subfamily: Danioninae
- Genus: Devario
- Species: D. myitkyinae

Binomial name
- Devario myitkyinae Kullander, 2017

Species of fish

Devario myitkyinae is a species of freshwater ray-finned fish belonging to the family Danionidae. This species is found in the Ayeyarwady River drainage near Myitkyina in Kachin State in northern Myanmar. It was described from specimens collected in 1997 and 1998 from a stream and lake near the city of Myitkyina.

It is similar to Devario browni and D. kakhienensis, but differing from D. fangae, which was described at the same time, in that the horizontal stripes on its flanks are narrow, irregular but equal in width as well as being somewhat curved away from the horizontal. It differs from all three of these species by the absence of any anterior widening of the middle dark stripe. All three dark stripes on the flanks are irregular and of equal width.
