= Devario apogon =

Scientific classification
- Kingdom: Animalia
- Phylum: Chordata
- Class: Actinopterygii
- Order: Cypriniformes
- Family: Danionidae
- Subfamily: Danioninae
- Genus: Devario
- Species: D. apogon

Binomial name
- Devario apogon (X. L. Chu, 1981)

Species of fish

Devario apogon is a fish from the Yunnan province of China which is not dissimilar to Devario shanensis and Devario interruptus. The fish appears to grow to a maximum of 5–6 cm and is found in the Irrawaddy drainage in Yunnan, China.
