= Devario fangae =

Scientific classification
- Kingdom: Animalia
- Phylum: Chordata
- Class: Actinopterygii
- Division: Teleostei
- Order: Cypriniformes
- Family: Danionidae
- Subfamily: Danioninae
- Genus: Devario
- Species: D. fangae

Binomial name
- Devario fangae Kullander, 2017

Species of fish

Devario fangae is a species of freshwater ray-finned fish belonging to the family Danionidae, the danios. This danio is endemic to Myanmar.

== Taxonomy ==
Devario fangae was first formally described by the Swedish ichthyologist Sven Kullander in 2017 with its type loality given as the Ayeyarwaddy River drainage, Nan Hto Chaung, in Putao, circa 1.61 km (1.00 mi) from 46th regiment, close to rice mill, Kachin State, Myanmar at 27°19'44"N, 97°22'36"E. The genus Devario is classified in the subfamily Danioninae of the family Danionidae.

== Etymology ==
Devario fangae is classified in the genus Devario, this name is tautonymous with Cyprinus devario being the type species of the genus, the name being derived from debari, a Bengali name for that species. The specific name is in memory of the late Fang Fang Kullander, Sven Kullander's wife, who collected the first specimens and who suggested they may represent a new species but died before she could formally describe it, in honour of her contribution to knowledge of the freshwater fish fauna of Myanmar.

== Description ==
Devario fangae appears to be closely related to Devario browni and to D. kakhienensis but is distinguished from them by the dark stripe along the middle of the side of the body being wider than the adjacent paler coloured stripes on either side.

== Distribution and habitat ==
Devario fangae is endemic to northern Myanmar where it is found in small hillstreams. In the dry season, the streams were less than 50 cm (20 in) deep and rarely more than 3 m (9.8 ft) wide, with clear water running over substrates of gravel, rocks or sand, with a relatively fast current, with many riffles.
