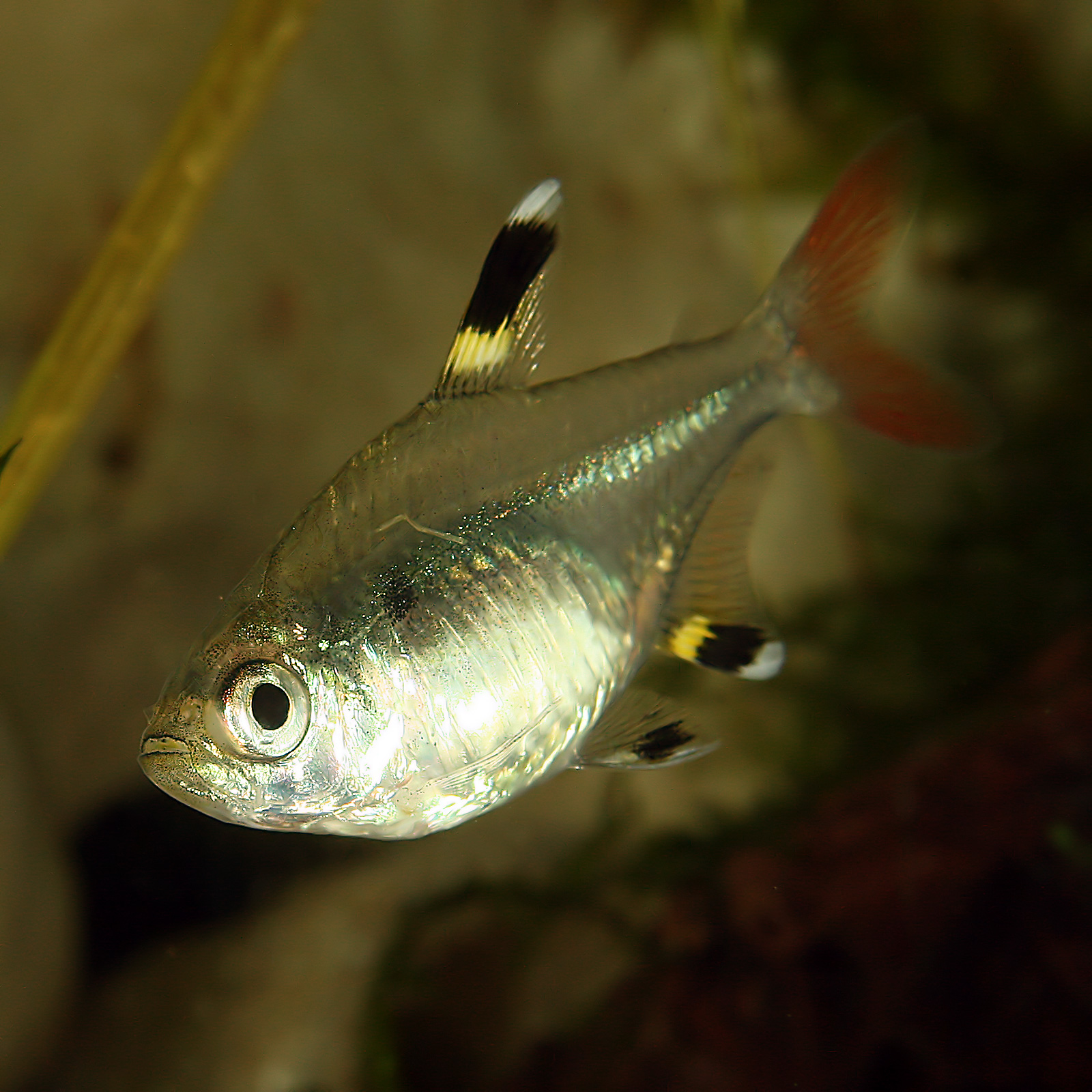
- Pristella maxillaris

Scientific classification
- Kingdom: Animalia
- Phylum: Chordata
- Class: Actinopterygii
- Division: Teleostei
- Order: Characiformes
- Family: Acestrorhamphidae
- Subfamily: Pristellinae
- Genus: Pristella; C. H. Eigenmann, 1908

Type species
- Holopristes riddlei Meek, 1907

Species
- 3, see text

= Pristella =

Genus of fishes

Pristella is a genus of freshwater ray-finned fishes belonging the family Acestrorhamphidae, the American characins. It was formerly a monotypic taxon only containing Pristella maxillaris, but in 2019 a second species, Pristella ariporo, was described.

== Taxonomy ==
Until 2019, Pristella was a monotypic genus, but P. ariporo was described in 2019. Additionally, Hyphessobrycon axelrodi may belong in Pristella due to its conical teeth, but further genetic studies are needed to confirm this.

== Species ==
Pristella contains the following valid species:

- Pristella ariporo Conde-Saldaña, Albornoz-Garzón, García-Melo, Villa-Navarro, Mirande & F. C. T. Lima, 2019
- Pristella crinogi F. C. T. Lima, Caires, Conde-Saldaña, Mirande & F. R. Carvalho, 2021
- Pristella maxillaris (Ulrey, 1894)
