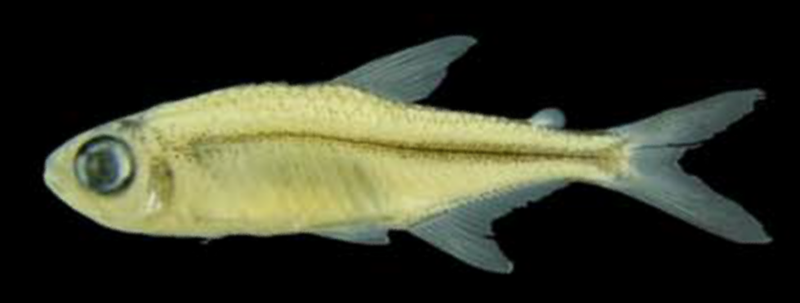

Conservation status
- Least Concern (IUCN 3.1)

Scientific classification
- Kingdom: Animalia
- Phylum: Chordata
- Class: Actinopterygii
- Order: Characiformes
- Family: Acestrorhamphidae
- Genus: Hemigrammus
- Species: H. gracilis

Binomial name
- Hemigrammus gracilis (Lütken, 1875)

Synonyms
- Hyphessobrycon gracilis

= Hemigrammus gracilis =

Species of fish

Hemigrammus gracilis is a species of freshwater fish belonging to the family Acestrorhamphidae, the American characins, of the order Characiformes. The species is found in the São Francisco and Amazon basins and was first described by Christian Frederik Lütken in 1875. As described by naturalist Jacques Géry, the species lacks the red lateral band found in other species of the genus such as Hemigrammus erythrozonus. It displays a faint bluish iridescence, lacks coloration in its fins, and has 1-3 small maxillary teeth. Males can reach a maximum length of 4.4 centimetres (1.7 in).
