= Ulrey =

Ulrey is a surname. Notable people with the surname include:

- Albert B. Ulrey (1860–1932), American footballer
- Dorian Ulrey (born 1987), American runner
