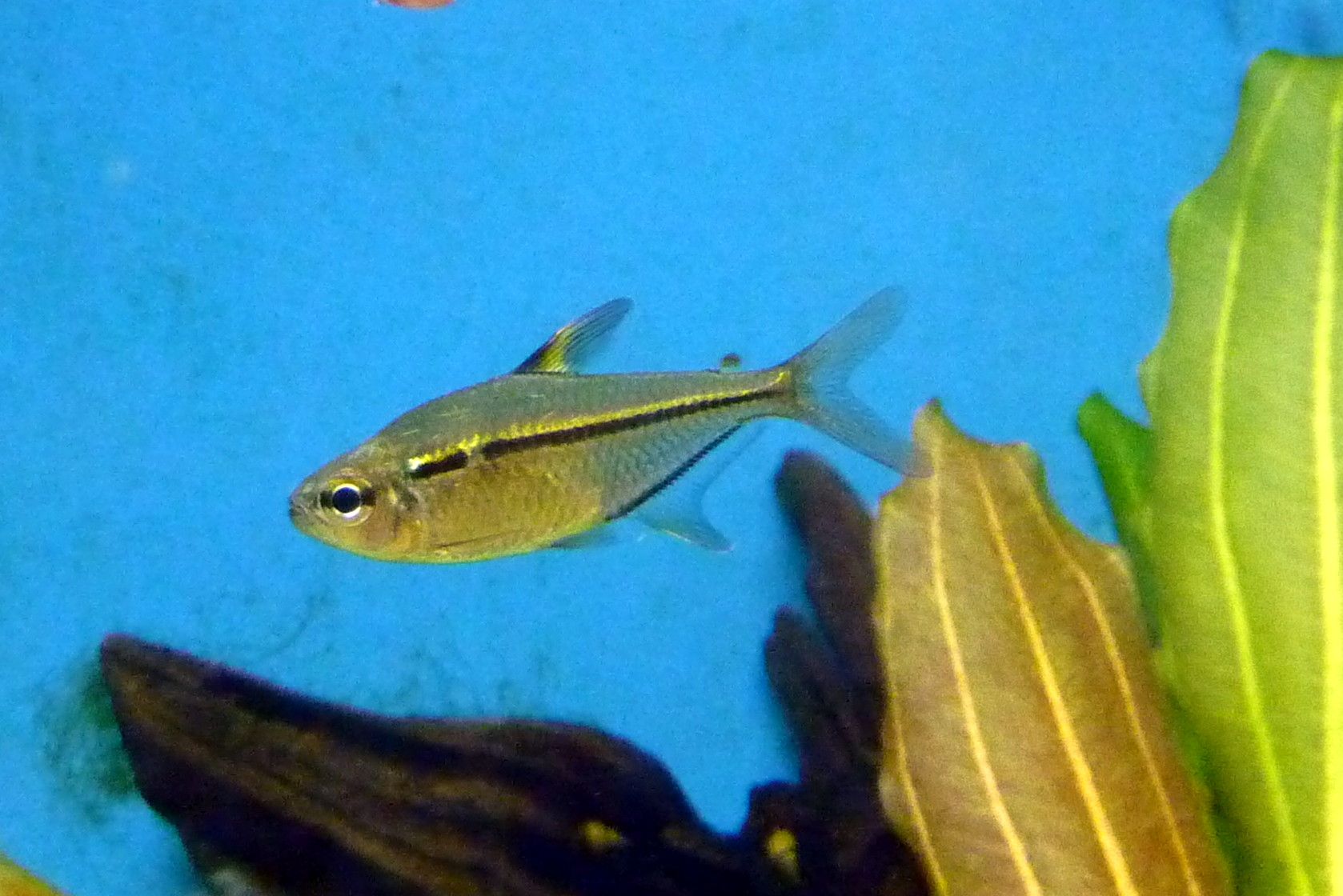

Conservation status
- Least Concern (IUCN 3.1)

Scientific classification
- Kingdom: Animalia
- Phylum: Chordata
- Class: Actinopterygii
- Order: Characiformes
- Family: Acestrorhamphidae
- Genus: Hemigrammus
- Species: H. ulreyi

Binomial name
- Hemigrammus ulreyi (Boulenger, 1895)

Synonyms
- Hyphessobrycon ulreyi Boulenger, 1895

= Hemigrammus ulreyi =

Species of fish

Hemigrammus ulreyi, commonly known as Ulrey's tetra, is a species of freshwater ray-finned fish belonging to the family Acestrorhamphidae, the American characins. This species is named in honor of the biologist Albert B. Ulrey. It was originally named Tetragonopterus ulreyi in 1895. This species is found in the basins of the Paraguay River and the middle Paraná River in Argentina, Brazil and Bolivia.

== In the aquarium ==
This aquarium fish suitable for a community aquarium can reach 5 cm (2.0 in) in length and does well at temperatures of 21 to 29 °C (70 to 84 °F).

=== Breeding ===
The breeding size is 4 cm (1.6 in). Dr. Herbert R. Axelrod, editor of Tropical Fish Hobbyist Magazine, and Dr. Leonard P. Schultz, retired curator of fishes at the Smithsonian Institution, wrote that the breeding of this species is a problem, since the species is nearly identical to Hyphessobrycon heterorhabdus and is difficult to spawn.
