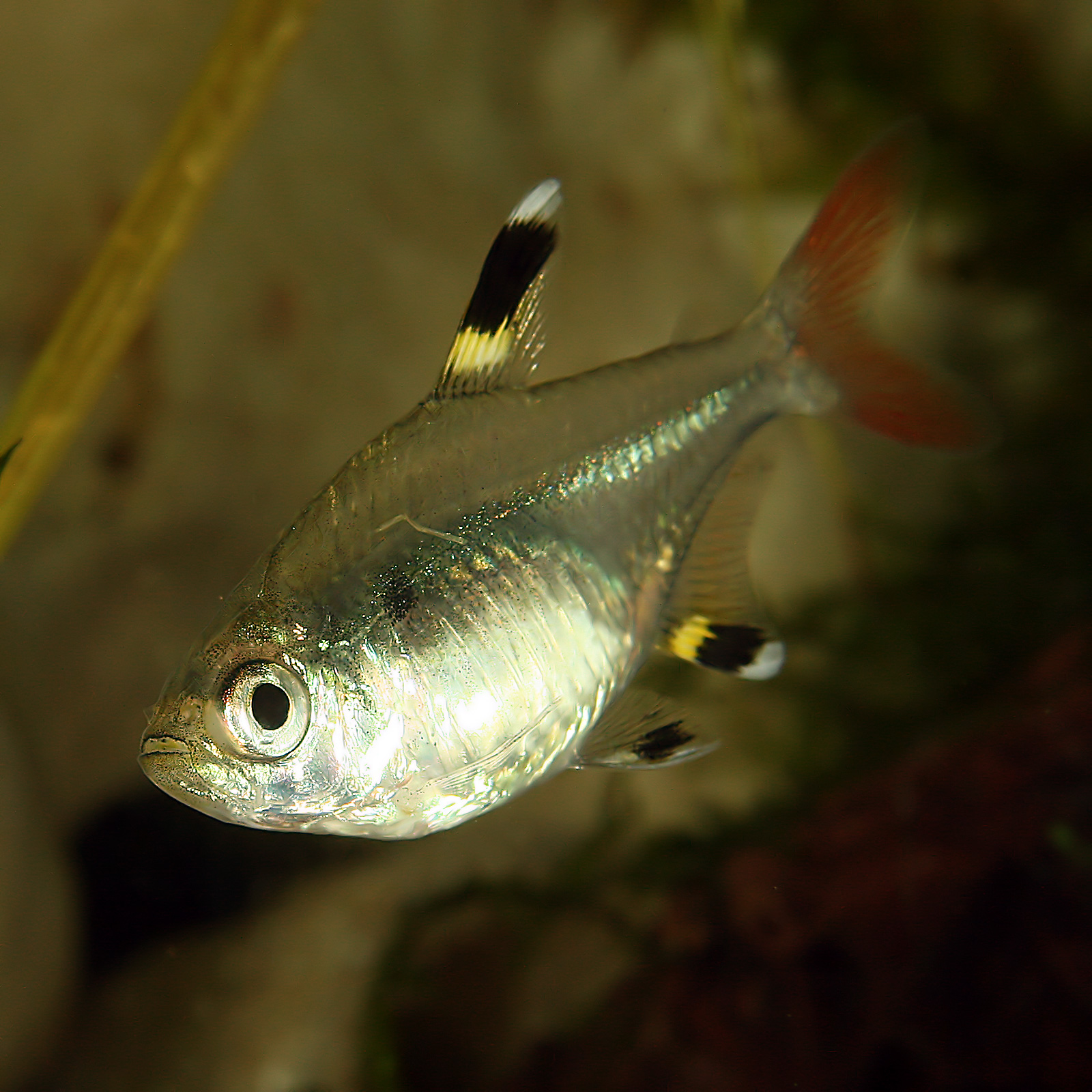

Conservation status
- Least Concern (IUCN 3.1)

Scientific classification
- Kingdom: Animalia
- Phylum: Chordata
- Class: Actinopterygii
- Order: Characiformes
- Family: Acestrorhamphidae
- Genus: Pristella
- Species: P. maxillaris

Binomial name
- Pristella maxillaris (Ulrey, 1894)

Synonyms
- Aphyocarax maxillaris Ulrey, 1894; Holopristis riddlei Meek, 1907; Pristella riddlei (Meek, 1907)

= Pristella maxillaris =

Species of fish

Pristella maxillaris, also known as the X-ray tetra or X-ray fish, is a species of freshwater ray-finned fish belonging to the family Acestrorhamphidae, the American characins. This translucent fish is found in South America and is a popular aquarium fish.

== Taxonomy ==
Pristella maxillaris was first formally described as Aphyocarax maxillaris in 1894 by the American biologist Albert B. Ulrey, with its type locality given as Brazil; a more precise location is thought likely to be eastern Pará. In 1908, Carl H. Eigenmann proposed the new monospecific genus Pristella with Holopristis riddlei designated as its type species, and only species. H. riddlei had been described in 1907 by Seth Eugene Meek, with its type locality given as Los Castillos on the Orinoco River in Venezuela. H. riddlei is now considered to be a junior synonym of Aphyocarax maxillaris. The genus Pristella is the type genus of the subfamily Pristellinae, which is classified within the American characin family, Acestrorhamphidae. This family is classified in the suborder Characoidei of the order Characiformes.

== Etymology ==
Pristella maxillaris, as Holopristis riddlei, is the type species of the genus Pristella. This name attaches the diminutive suffix -ella to pristis, a word meaning "one who saws". Eigenmann did not explain this name, but it may be refer to the minute, conical teeth of this species scattered along the maxilla. The specific name, maxillaris, also refers to the teeth along the maxilla.

== Description ==
Pristella maxillaris has a fusiform shaped body with a maximum total length of 4.5 cm (1.8 in). This species typically has a translucent body with the spine being visible from the outside. Its scales are yellowish-silver, almost golden, in colour. The caudal fin is red and the anal and dorsal fins are spotted with black, yellow and white. There is a small round, humeral spot similar in size to the pupil, and the adipose fin is hyaline.

== Distribution and habitat ==
Pristella maxillaris is found in South America, where it is known from the Amazon and Orinoco rivers in Brazil and Venezuela, and from coastal rivers in the Guianas and Brazil. These tetras are found in slow flowing and still waters with abundant aquatic vegetation.

== Utilisation ==
Pristella maxillaris is a popular fish in the aquarium trade, where it is considered to be hardy and easy to maintain, a good fish for beginners in the hobby. Almost all the fish in the aquarium trade are captive bred, especially in Eastern Europe.
