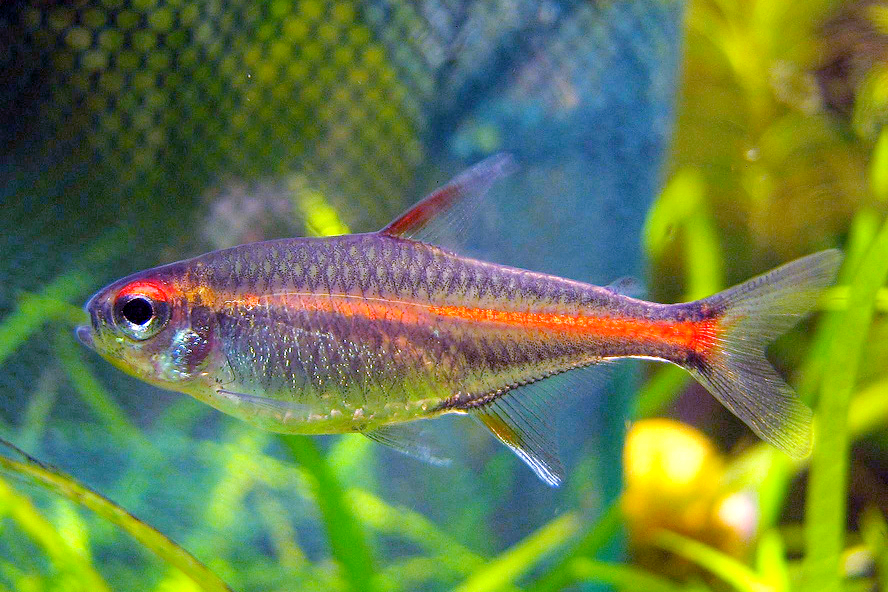

Conservation status
- Least Concern (IUCN 3.1)

Scientific classification
- Kingdom: Animalia
- Phylum: Chordata
- Class: Actinopterygii
- Division: Teleostei
- Order: Characiformes
- Family: Acestrorhamphidae
- Genus: Hemigrammus
- Species: H. erythrozonus

Binomial name
- Hemigrammus erythrozonus Durbin, 1909

= Hemigrammus erythrozonus =

Species of fish

Hemigrammus erythrozonus, the glowlight tetra, is a species of freshwater ray-finned fish belonging to the family Acestrorhamphidae, the American characins. This fish is found in the Essequibo River and the Courantyne River in Guyana and Suriname. It is silver in colour and a bright iridescent orange to red stripe extends from the snout to the base of its tail, the front of the dorsal fin being the same color as the stripe. Other fins are silver to transparent. The glowlight tetra is a peaceful, shoaling fish. It is larger than the neon tetra, and its peaceful disposition makes it an ideal, and popular, community tank fish. It should be kept with similar sized, non-aggressive species. Hemigrammus gracilis is a senior synonym. The red-line rasbora (Rasbora pauciperforata) of Malaysia and Indonesia has markings and coloring very similar to H. erythrozonus, but is a member of order Cypriniformes, not a close relative.

H. erythrozonus is a medium-sized tetra growing to 4 to 5 cm (1.6 to 2.0 in), notably larger than both neon and cardinal tetras. It has a life span of two to four years when kept in good conditions.

In the wild, the fish eats aquatic insect larvae.

== In the aquarium ==
H. erythrozonus is readily available and usually inexpensive. Golden and albino varieties are also sold. It is best seen in the freshwater aquarium when kept in subdued lighting with a dark substrate.

=== Water conditions ===
The water should be soft to slightly hard, d°GH of 6° to 15°, with a slightly acidic pH of 6.8, in the range 6.0 – 7.5. It prefers a temperature of 25 °C (77 °F) in the range 22–28 °C (72–82 °F).

The hardiness of this fish allows it easily to adapt to harder water, though soft water is essential for captive breeding.

=== Nutrition ===
H. erythrozonus is an omnivore and in the aquarium eats small live, frozen and dry foods and flake foods. The feeding of vegetable matter is suggested to vary the diet.

=== Shoaling ===
Like all tetras, H. erythrozonus is happiest, most active, and most aesthetically pleasing when in a shoal. A minimum aquarium length of 60 cm (2 ft) will make them more comfortable when swimming. Longer and more spacious tanks are preferred to taller tank setups. They prefer a well planted tank for hiding, but with some open water for free swimming. They should be a group of at least four with eight or more to make them feel secure. They tend to swim in tighter groups when a potential predator is present and swim freely when comfortable. They are often bought by aquarium owners to play a 'second fiddle' role to the neon tetra. Although they generally shoal separately from neon and cardinal tetras, they will sometimes shoal alongside the latter, making an arresting spectacle.

=== Sexing ===
Like most tetras, females are larger and more fat bodied than the more slender male. It may be hard to tell male from female until the fish are fully mature and females fill with eggs.

=== Breeding ===
H. erythrozonus breeds similarly to most egg-scattering small fish. It been bred in captivity with a moderate level of difficulty.

Breeding tank set-up: A small 40l all-glass tank with soft water (hardness up to 8°dGH and carbonate hardness not higher than 2°dCH). Water temperature should be kept between 26 and 28 °C (79 and 82 °F). Adding peat to the tank or filter will soften water and make it slightly acidic. The tank should have dim or no lighting. Spawning is over fine-leaved plants. Java moss (Taxiphyllum barbieri) or Fontinalis are suggested but not mandatory, or a spawning mop made of woolen thread. Other commonly used plants include water wisteria and hornworts, as well as fox/coons tail. 1 cm glass beads or a spawning grate will help at the bottom to protect eggs from being eaten by adults, though they will have to spawn through the plants first, as the fine leaves act as a trigger. If spawned without fine leaved plants, the majority of eggs will result unfertilized.

Parents' conditioning: Feed the pair kept separately with a variety of live foods, frozen food or dry food for a few weeks. When the female is well rounded transfer the pair to the breeding tank in the late afternoon hours. The spawning will occur in the following morning or the next day; if no spawning behavior is shown after three days, conditioning of the pair should be restarted.

Spawning behavior: The male will swim around in a quick manner locking his fins when near the female. During the spawning act both fish roll over, when the female is in the upside down position she ejects the eggs while the male fertilises them. Usually 120–150 eggs are dropped on plants and on to the bottom. When the pair is done, they will start grazing for the eggs and should be removed.

Raising the fry: The eggs are light sensitive, so the breeding tank should be as dark as possible. Some believe light contributes greatly to the eggs succumbing to fungal infections, though this may have more to do with cleanliness of tank and water conditions. Methylene blue may be added to the water column to prevent fungi as well. The fry will hatch in 20 to 25 hours, looking like small slivers of glass. Fry can be fed with infusoria, paramecium culture, crushed flakes, and rotifers after they have used all the yolk sack. On the fourth day a very small portion of newly hatched brine shrimp should be introduced. The young consume relatively large live foods such as nauplii of brine shrimp. Later microworms can be added to the diet.

Care of the breeding tank: Bottom sediment should always be removed and regular water changes done during the rearing period in order to avoid an accumulation of ammonium and nitrates which can be toxic to the fry. Although large quantities of fry will incubate in waters of low hardness, most of the fry may soon contract non-infectious, constitutional dropsy, and die within a short time. Those which survive will grow well. By the twelfth day, they will show signs of a silver coloring. At three weeks of age, the fry will start showing their characteristic orange line and will be a size of about 1 cm (1/2 in). By two months they will be about 2 cm (3/4 in).

== See also ==
- List of freshwater aquarium fish species
