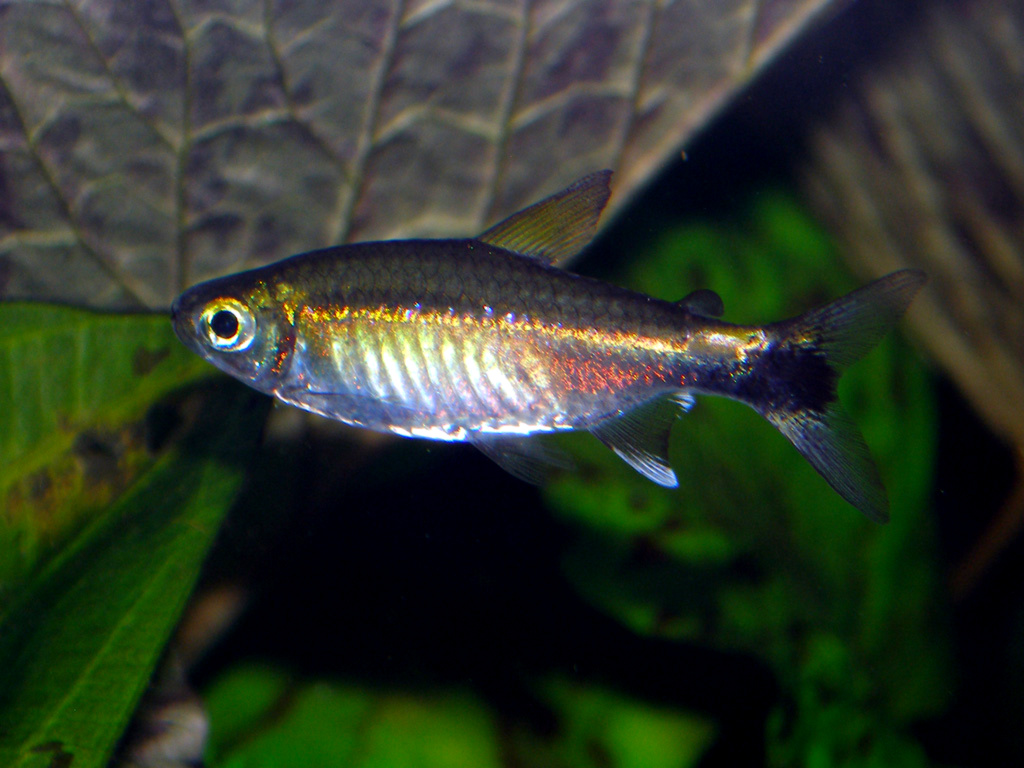

Conservation status
- Least Concern (IUCN 3.1)

Scientific classification
- Kingdom: Animalia
- Phylum: Chordata
- Class: Actinopterygii
- Division: Teleostei
- Order: Characiformes
- Family: Acestrorhamphidae
- Genus: Hemigrammus
- Species: H. hyanuary

Binomial name
- Hemigrammus hyanuary Durbin, 1918

= Hemigrammus hyanuary =

Species of fish

Hemigrammus hyanuary, the January tetra or Costello tetra, is a species of freshwater ray-finned fish belonging to the family Acestrorhamphidae. This fish is found in the Amazon Basin in South America. This species is uncommonly found in the aquarium trade.

== Taxonomy ==
Hemigrammus hyanuary was first formally described in 1918 by the American entomologist and ichthyologist Marion Durbin Ellis, with its type locality given as Lake Hyanuary in Brazil. This species belongs to the genus Hemigrammus, which is classified in the subfamily Pristellinae of the American characin family Acestrorhamphidae. This family is classified within the suborder Characoidei of the order Characiformes.

== Distribution ==
Costello tetras are found in the Amazon Basin.

== In the aquarium ==
Costello tetras have been kept in the aquarium hobby. Some foods aquarists feed them include flakes, pellets, and live foods. Wild caught specimens sport a characteristic golden sheen to their scales; the presence of a parasite found within their native range that causes this unusual pigmentation. Captive bred Costello tetra do not display this coloration, and instead present with a silver iridescent scalation, more typical of many others within the Characidae family.
