= Dither (disambiguation) =

Dither is a process used in digital signal processing. Dither may also refer to:

- Dither fish, a term used by aquarists for certain types of fish
- Dither (album), an album by the rock group moe.
