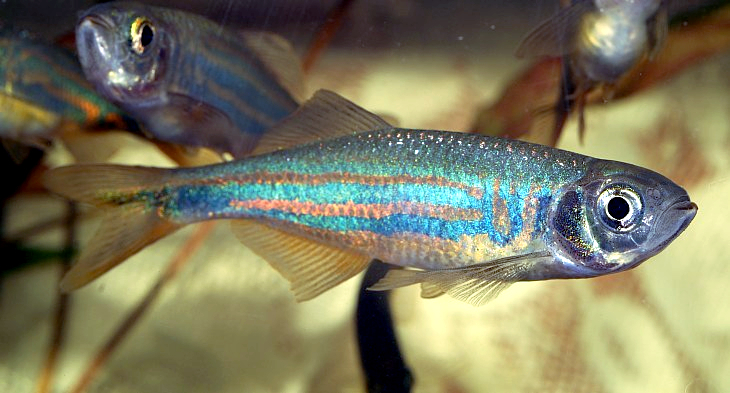

Conservation status
- Least Concern (IUCN 3.1)

Scientific classification
- Kingdom: Animalia
- Phylum: Chordata
- Class: Actinopterygii
- Order: Cypriniformes
- Family: Danionidae
- Subfamily: Danioninae
- Genus: Devario
- Species: D. malabaricus

Binomial name
- Devario malabaricus (Jerdon, 1849)

Synonyms
- Perilampus malabaricus Jerdon, 1849; Danio malabaricus (Jerdon, 1849); Puntius malabaricus (Jerdon, 1849); Perilampus canarensis Jerdon, 1849; Perilampus mysoricus Jerdon, 1849; Danio micronema Bleeker, 1863; Perilampus aurolineatus Day, 1865; Paradanio aurolineatus (Day, 1865); Eustira ceylonensis Günther, 1868; Perilampus ceylonensis (Günther, 1868)

= Malabar danio =

Species of fish

The Malabar danio (Devario malabaricus) is a species of freshwater ray-finned fish in the family Danionidae. Originating in Sri Lanka and the west coast of India, the fish has been circulated throughout the world through the aquarium trade.

The Malabar danio is found in tropical climates in a wide variety of waters, from mountain streams to small pools, but it prefers flowing waters. It is an active shoaling fish.

== Taxonomy and etymology ==
The Malabar danio was described in 1849 as Perilampus malabaricus by the English physician and zoologist Thomas C. Jerdon with the type locality given as Chalakudy River, a river in the southern Indian state of Kerala. The specific epithet refers to this fact, as southern India was then known as Malabar. The species was at a time incorrectly considered a synonym of Devario aequipinnatus, which is a valid name for a different species.

== Description ==
The Malabar danio is a relatively small (although comparatively large compared to many other species in the family), brightly colored fusiform fish. It is laterally compressed and has a superior mouth. It has a few orange longitudinal stripes on its flanks that may be broken up, and there are a few irregular vertical bars on the anterior half of their bodies, just in front of the longitudinal stripes. These bars are also orange. The dorsal fin sits posteriorly with 12 to 16 soft rays, and the anal fin contains 15 to 20 soft rays. The caudal fin is forked. The Malabar danio grows to a maximum length of 15 cm, but rarely exceeds 10 cm in a home aquarium.

The Malabar danio possesses a "danionin notch", which is an indentation of the lower jar characteristic of the family Danionidae. And like its congeners, the Malabar danio possesses a maxillary barbel and a P stripe (P standing for "pigment" here) that extends on the median caudal fin rays.

There are at least five other Sri Lankan Devario species, and the Malabar danio can be distinguished from them by its anteriorly bifurcated P stripe that originates at the caudal fin. Both sexes lack nuptial tubercles; however, males have epidermal tubercles located on the anterior rays of the pectoral fin.

(Figure 1. A simplified diagram of Devario fish. Numbers correspond to landmarks for measurements taken in a study.)

(Figure 2. Live color patterns and specimen color patterns of D. malabaricus (orange dot) and D. micronema (green dot).)

(Figure 3. A phylogenetic tree depicts the evolutionary relationships between five Sri Lankan Devario species. A map locating Sri Lanka is displayed alongside.)

== Distribution and habitat ==
The Malabar danio is a widespread habitat generalist native to the lowest peneplains of both Sri Lanka and southern India. To be more precise, the Malabar danio occurs in lowland flood plains, hill streams, and mountain torrents up to 1,300 m above sea level, in various ecoclimatic zones whose waters vary in turbidity, shade, and disturbance levels. It can live in both lotic and lentic ecosystems, and (at least in Sri Lanka) can be found in both dry and wet zones. The preferred temperature range is 18-25 °C. Its ecological generalism is perhaps the reason why it is the only Sri Lankan Devario species also occurring in India, and this generalism may be linked to its greater sexual dimorphism compared to the other Sri Lankan Devario species, such as Devario micronema. The relatively wide geographic distribution of the Malabar danio appears to be a contributor to its relatively unrestricted gene flow, as this species lack the phylogeographic structure observed in other Sri Lankan Devario species.

== Biology and life history ==
The Malabar danio often forms medium-sized shoals close to the water surface. It feeds on terrestrial insects, plant matter and detritus, and has been found to have an easier time searching for and actually finding food at higher temperatures (even though the elevated temperatures do not lead to a significant increase in body speed).

The Malabar danio is oviparous and is a group spawner. Spawning happens in shallow water among plants growing on the bottom after heavy rains, and each female will spawn around 200 light-orange, sticky eggs that hatch in one to two days; the fry will be free-swimming after the fifth day. The Malabar danio does not exhibit parental care; on the contrary, the parents may eat their own eggs. Hence, it is recommended to remove the parents from the aquarium where spawning occurred to ensure that as many eggs as possible survive.

The Malabar danio is extremely difficult to identify as juveniles, but can be reliably identified once mature. Size and maturity go hand in hand for this species. Males are said to reach maturity at a length of 5 cm and this number is 4 cm for females. Fecundity ranges between 20 and 30 per gm body weight.

Interestingly, the Malabar danio would release a chemical called 7-hydroxybiopterin when injured; when sensed, this signal alerts conspecifics to swim rapidly away. This alarm mechanism has also been observed in other cypriniform fish species.

== Conservation status ==
The IUCN Red List listed the Malabar danio as Least Concern as of August 2019. The IUCN had previously assessed this species as Least Concern in 2009 and 2011, suggesting that this species had had a relatively stable overall population. However, the Malabar danio does has threats, as there are many common issues plaguing other aquatic life in this region, including anthropogenic habitat alteration, agricultural pollution, the construction of dams, indiscriminate fishing, invasive species, and climate change.

Additionally, due to the status of the Malabar danio as a popular aquarium fish, exploitation for the aquarium trade may also lead to population decline. Captive breeding programs for the aquarium trade in places such as Singapore, Thailand and Hong Kong have helped alleviate the pressure exerted by the aquarium trade on the wild population.

== See also ==
- List of freshwater aquarium fish species
