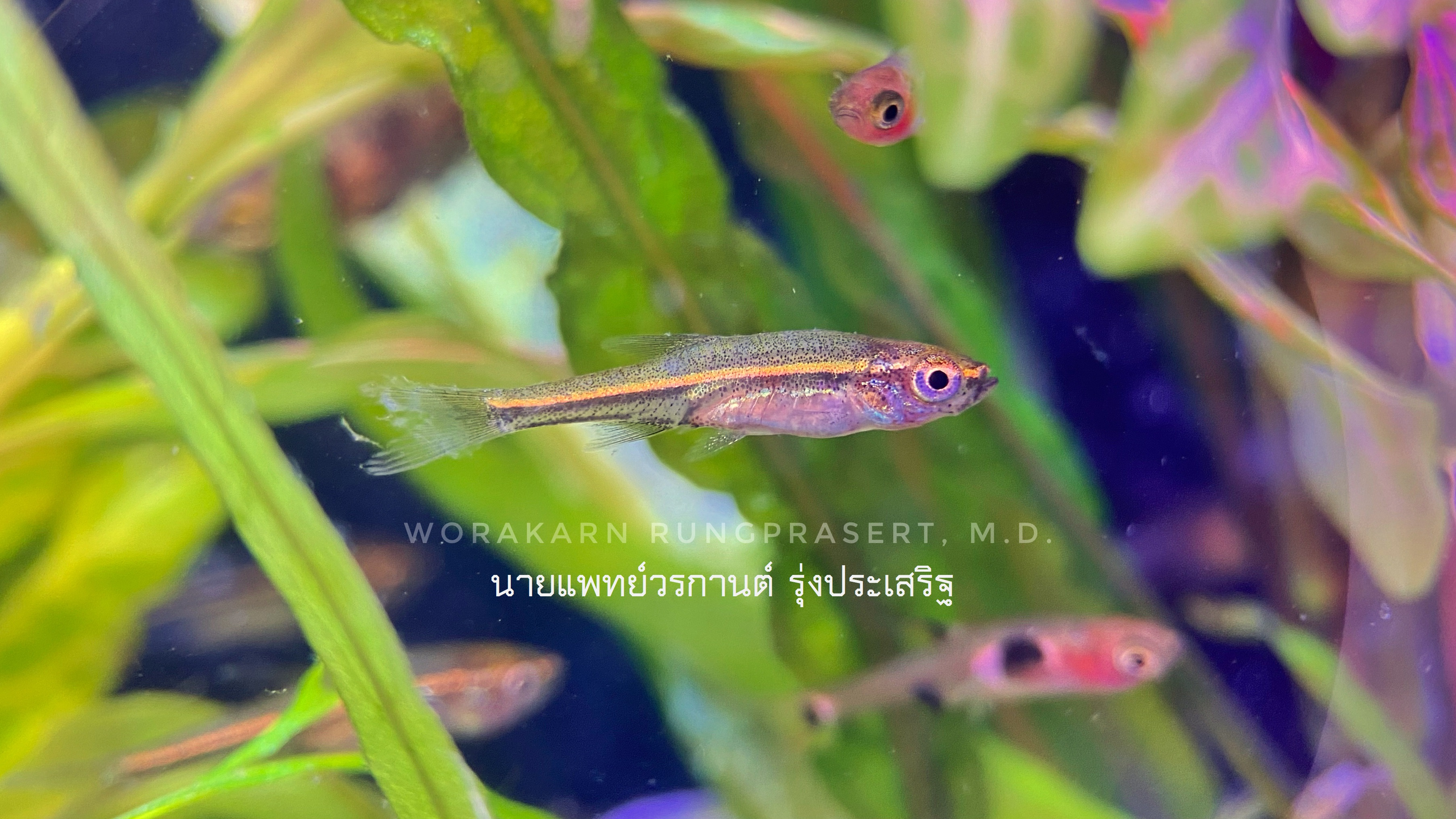

Conservation status
- Least Concern (IUCN 3.1)

Scientific classification
- Kingdom: Animalia
- Phylum: Chordata
- Class: Actinopterygii
- Order: Cypriniformes
- Family: Danionidae
- Subfamily: Rasborinae
- Genus: Trigonopoma
- Species: T. gracile

Binomial name
- Trigonopoma gracile (Kottelat, 1991)

= Trigonopoma gracile =

Species of fish

Trigonopoma gracile is a species of freshwater ray-finned fish belonging to the family Danionidae. This species is found in Indonesia and Malaysia.

A common name in use is Graceful Rasbora.

== Description ==
Differs from all of its congeners by the following combination of characters: lateral line incomplete to absent, perforating 0–6 scales; 29–32 scales along normal course of lateral line; a conspicuous black (bluish black in life) lateral stripe from tip of snout to extremity of median caudal rays; body slender, its depth 4.4-4.8 times in SL (4.0-5.1); caudal peduncle slender than all other Rasbora, its depth 2.3-2.8 times in its length (2.3-3.3); and long and pointed dorsal and anal fins.
