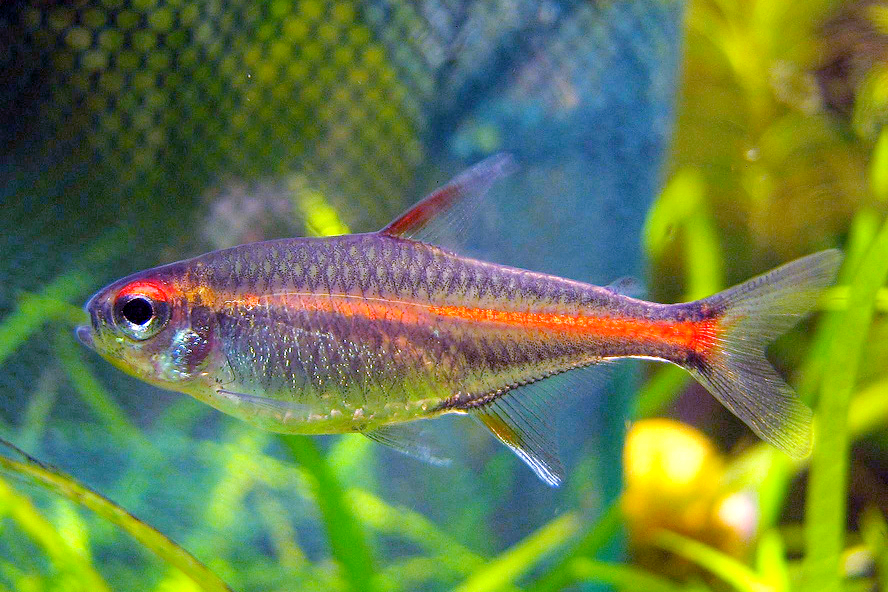
- Hemigrammus erythrozonus

Scientific classification
- Kingdom: Animalia
- Phylum: Chordata
- Class: Actinopterygii
- Division: Teleostei
- Order: Characiformes
- Family: Acestrorhamphidae
- Subfamily: Pristellinae
- Genus: Hemigrammus; T. N. Gill, 1858

Type species
- Poecilurichthys (Hemigrammus) unilineatus Gill 1858

Synonyms
- Aphyodite C. H. Eigenmann, 1912

= Hemigrammus =

Genus of fishes

Hemigrammus is a genus of freshwater ray-finned fishes that belongs to the family Acestrorhamphidae (American characins). Members of this genus are found in South America, including Trinidad. They are commonly seen in the aquarium trade.

== Description ==
These are medium-small tetras where the largest species reach up to around 11 cm (4.3 in).

== Species ==
There are currently 55 recognized species in this genus:

- Hemigrammus amacayacu Albornoz‐Garzón, Méndez‐López, DoNascimiento & Lima, 2019
- Hemigrammus analis Durbin, 1909
- Hemigrammus apiaka (Esguícero & Castro, 2017)
- Hemigrammus arua F. C. T. Lima, Wosiacki & C. S. Ramos, 2009
- Hemigrammus ataktos Marinho, D'Agosta & Birindelli, 2014
- Hemigrammus barrigonae C. H. Eigenmann & Henn, 1914
- Hemigrammus bellottii (Steindachner, 1882)
- Hemigrammus boesemani Géry, 1959
- Hemigrammus brevis Durbin, 1911
- Hemigrammus changae Ota, F. C. T. Lima & Hidalgo, 2019
- Hemigrammus coeruleus Durbin, 1908
- Hemigrammus collettii (Steindachner, 1882)
- Hemigrammus copei (Steindachner, 1882)
- Hemigrammus cupreus Durbin, 1918
- Hemigrammus cylindricus Durbin, 1909
- Hemigrammus diagonicus Mendonça & Wosiacki, 2011
- Hemigrammus durbinae Ota, F. C. T. Lima & Pavanelli, 2015
- Hemigrammus eigenmanni (Géry, 1964)
- Hemigrammus elegans (Steindachner, 1882)
- Hemigrammus erythrozonus Durbin, 1909 (Glowlight tetra)
- Hemigrammus filamentosus Zarske, 2011
- Hemigrammus flavus (Britzke, Troy, Oliveira & Benine, 2018
- Hemigrammus gracilis (Lütken, 1875)
- Hemigrammus grammicus C. H. Eigenmann, 1912
- Hemigrammus hyanuary Durbin, 1918 (Costello tetra)
- Hemigrammus iota Durbin, 1909
- Hemigrammus kuroobi Reia & Benine, 2019
- Hemigrammus levis Durbin, 1908
- Hemigrammus lunatus Durbin, 1918
- Hemigrammus machadoi Ota, F. C. T. Lima & Pavanelli, 2014
- Hemigrammus mahnerti Uj & Géry, 1989
- Hemigrammus marginatus Durbin, 1911
- Hemigrammus megaceps Fowler, 1945
- Hemigrammus melanochrous Fowler, 1913
- Hemigrammus melogrammus C. H. Eigenmann, 1908
- Hemigrammus micropterus Meek, 1907
- Hemigrammus microstomus Durbin, 1918
- Hemigrammus mimus J. E. Böhlke, 1955
- Hemigrammus ora Zarske, Le Bail & Géry, 2006
- Hemigrammus orthus Durbin, 1909
- Hemigrammus parana Marinho, F. R. de Carvalho, Langeani & Tatsumi, 2008
- Hemigrammus pretoensis Géry, 1965
- Hemigrammus rodwayi Durbin, 1909 (Gold tetra)
- Hemigrammus rubrostriatus Zarske, 2015
- Hemigrammus schmardae (Steindachner, 1882)
- Hemigrammus serrazul Ribeiro & Ferreira et al, 2023
- Hemigrammus silimoni Britski & F. C. T. Lima, 2008
- Hemigrammus stictus (Durbin, 1909)
- Hemigrammus taphorni Benine & G. A. M. Lopes, 2007
- Hemigrammus tocantinsi F. R. de Carvalho, Bertaco & Jerep, 2010
- Hemigrammus tridens C. H. Eigenmann, 1907
- Hemigrammus tupebas (Esguícero & Castro, 2017)
- Hemigrammus ulreyi (Boulenger, 1895)
- Hemigrammus unilineatus (T. N. Gill, 1858) (Feather-fin tetra)
- Hemigrammus vorderwinkleri Géry, 1963
- Hemigrammus xaveriellus Lima, Urbano-Bonilla & Prada-Pedreros, 2020
