= Fraser's danio =

Conservation status
- Vulnerable (IUCN 3.1)

Scientific classification
- Domain: Eukaryota
- Kingdom: Animalia
- Phylum: Chordata
- Class: Actinopterygii
- Order: Cypriniformes
- Family: Danionidae
- Subfamily: Danioninae
- Genus: Devario
- Species: D. fraseri

Binomial name
- Devario fraseri (Hora, 1935)

Synonyms
- Danio fraseri Hora, 1935

Species of fish

Fraser's danio or Fraser danio (Devario fraseri) is a freshwater fish endemic to waters in the northern Western Ghats in the state of Maharashtra in India.
