= Devario yuensis =

Conservation status
- Vulnerable (IUCN 3.1)

Scientific classification
- Kingdom: Animalia
- Phylum: Chordata
- Class: Actinopterygii
- Order: Cypriniformes
- Family: Danionidae
- Subfamily: Danioninae
- Genus: Devario
- Species: D. yuensis

Binomial name
- Devario yuensis (Arunkumar & Tombi Singh, 1998)

Synonyms
- Danio yuensis Arunkumar & Tombi Singh, 1998

Species of fish

Devario yuensis is a species of freshwater ray-finned fish belonging to the family Danionidae. This species is endemic to the Lokchao River in India and Myanmar.
