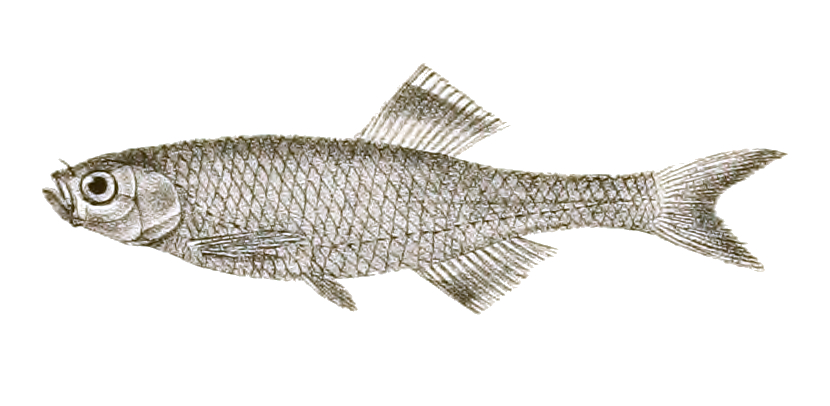

Conservation status
- Endangered (IUCN 3.1)

Scientific classification
- Kingdom: Animalia
- Phylum: Chordata
- Class: Actinopterygii
- Order: Cypriniformes
- Family: Danionidae
- Subfamily: Danioninae
- Genus: Devario
- Species: D. neilgherriensis

Binomial name
- Devario neilgherriensis (Day, 1867)

Synonyms
- Danio neilgherriensis (Day, 1867); Paradanio neilgherriensis Day, 1867

= Nilgiri danio =

Species of fish

The Nilgiri danio (Devario neilgherriensis) is a species of freshwater ray-finned fish belonging to the family Danionidae. This species is endemic to the Western Ghats in southerwestern India.
