= Devario naganensis =

Conservation status
- Vulnerable (IUCN 3.1)

Scientific classification
- Kingdom: Animalia
- Phylum: Chordata
- Class: Actinopterygii
- Order: Cypriniformes
- Family: Danionidae
- Subfamily: Danioninae
- Genus: Devario
- Species: D. naganensis

Binomial name
- Devario naganensis (Chaudhuri, 1912)

Synonyms
- Danio naganensis Chaudhuri, 1912

Freshwater fish endemic to India

Devario naganensis is a species of freshwater ray-finned fish belonging to the family Danionidae. This fis is endemic to the Chindwin River basin in Manipur and Nagaland, Northeast India; its range could extend into Myanmar. It grows to 6.3 cm (2.5 in) total length.
