= Devario manipurensis =

Conservation status
- Data Deficient (IUCN 3.1)

Scientific classification
- Kingdom: Animalia
- Phylum: Chordata
- Class: Actinopterygii
- Order: Cypriniformes
- Family: Danionidae
- Subfamily: Danioninae
- Genus: Devario
- Species: D. manipurensis

Binomial name
- Devario manipurensis (Barman, 1987)

Synonyms
- Danio manipurensis Barman, 1987

Species of fish

Devario manipurensis is a freshwater fish endemic to India.
