= Devario horai =

Conservation status
- Endangered (IUCN 3.1)

Scientific classification
- Kingdom: Animalia
- Phylum: Chordata
- Class: Actinopterygii
- Order: Cypriniformes
- Family: Danionidae
- Genus: Devario
- Species: D. horai

Binomial name
- Devario horai (Barman, 1983)

Synonyms
- Danio horai Barman, 1983

Species of fish

Devario horai is a freshwater fish first described from hill streams in the Namdapha National Park in India.
