= Hyphessobrycon heterorhabdus =

Conservation status
- Least Concern (IUCN 3.1)

Scientific classification
- Kingdom: Animalia
- Phylum: Chordata
- Class: Actinopterygii
- Order: Characiformes
- Family: Acestrorhamphidae
- Genus: Hyphessobrycon
- Species: H. heterorhabdus

Binomial name
- Hyphessobrycon heterorhabdus (Ulrey, 1894)

Species of fish

Hyphessobrycon heterorhabdus, the flag tetra or Belgian flag tetra, is a species of freshwater ray-finned fish belonging to the family Acestrorhamphidae, the American characins. This fish is distinguished by its vibrant coloration and patterns, which have contributed to its popularity in the aquarium trade.

== Description ==
Hyphessobrycon heterorhabdus exhibits a distinctively elongated and laterally compressed body shape, characteristic of many species within the characin family. One of its most striking features is its vividly red-colored eyes, which contrast sharply with its overall body coloration. Along its lateral line, the fish displays a prominent stripe that integrates black, red, and yellow lines. This unique color pattern bears a resemblance to the national flag of Belgium, from which the common names 'flag tetra' and 'Belgian flag tetra' are derived.

The coloration of this species not only serves an aesthetic purpose in aquarium settings, but also plays a role in intra-species communication and camouflage in its natural habitat. The stripe pattern can vary slightly among individuals, reflecting factors such as age, health, and environmental conditions. These adaptive features illustrate the fish's evolutionary responses to its surroundings and social interactions within schools.

== Habitat ==
Hyphessobrycon heterorhabdus is indigenous to the freshwater ecosystems of Brazil, primarily found in the Amazon Basin. This species favors environments that offer a combination of clear and blackwater conditions, indicative of waters that are either transparent or tea-colored due to dissolved organic materials. The preferred habitats are typically characterized by a slow to moderate flow, often within smaller streams, creeks, and tributaries that are shaded by the dense canopy of the rainforest.

These shaded, forested waterways provide a multitude of hiding places and breeding grounds, crucial for the survival and reproduction of the flag tetra. The dense vegetation and submerged woody debris found in these habitats not only offer protection from predators, but also house a diverse array of microorganisms and invertebrates that form the diet of this species. The water chemistry of their natural habitat tends to be slightly acidic to neutral, with a soft to moderately hard composition, reflecting the decomposing organic matter present in these environments.

== Diet ==
The diet of Hyphessobrycon heterorhabdus predominantly consists of small invertebrates and plant matter. In their natural habitat within the Amazon Basin, these fish adapt to a varied diet that includes micro-crustaceans, worms, small insects, and detritus, reflecting the rich biodiversity of their ecosystem. The availability of such food sources is abundant in the slow-moving streams and creeks where they reside, often beneath the dense canopy of the rainforest which contributes to the proliferation of a diverse microfauna.

In addition to animal-based nutrients, flag tetras also graze on algae and other plant materials found on submerged surfaces, such as rocks and driftwood. This omnivorous diet is crucial for their growth and overall health, providing a balanced intake of proteins, vitamins, and minerals.

== Breeding ==
Breeding Hyphessobrycon heterorhabdus in captivity involves creating conditions that mimic their natural habitat, particularly the rainy season of the Amazon Basin. A dedicated breeding tank with soft, acidic water (pH 6.0 to 6.5), a temperature of around 24°C (75°F), dim lighting, and fine-leaved plants or spawning mops can encourage spawning. Flag tetras, being egg scatterers without parental instincts, may consume their eggs, necessitating the removal of adults post-spawning or the use of a mesh bottom or marbles to protect the eggs. The eggs usually hatch within 24 to 36 hours, with fry initially fed on infusoria or liquid fry food until they can eat micro worms or baby brine shrimp. Attention to water quality and a gradual introduction to the adult diet are critical for the fry's growth and health. This process not only enables the conservation of the species but also allows aquarists to observe the lifecycle of these vibrant fish.

== Disease ==
Flag tetra, like many aquarium fish, are susceptible to a range of common diseases, particularly when kept in suboptimal water conditions or overcrowded tanks. One prevalent condition is Ichthyophthirius multifiliis, commonly known as "ich" or white spot disease, characterized by white, salt-like spots on the fish's body and gills, often leading to increased irritability and rubbing against tank surfaces. Another common ailment is fin rot, a bacterial infection that causes the edges of the fins to appear frayed or disintegrated, often resulting from poor water quality or stress.
