= Pristella crinogi =

Conservation status
- Data Deficient (IUCN 3.1)

Scientific classification
- Kingdom: Animalia
- Phylum: Chordata
- Class: Actinopterygii
- Order: Characiformes
- Family: Acestrorhamphidae
- Genus: Pristella
- Species: P. crinogi

Binomial name
- Pristella crinogi F. C. T. Lima, Caires, Conde-Saldaña, Mirande & F. R. Carvalho, 2021

Species of fish

Pristella crinogi is a species of freshwater ray-finned fish belonging to the family Acestrorhamphidae, the American characins. It is found in the basins of the Tocantins River and São Francisco River.

== Size ==
This species reaches a length of 2.1 cm (0.83 in).

== Etymology ==
The fish is named in honor of Brazilian herpetologist Cristiano de Campos Nogueira (“Crinog”), for his help during the 2008 fish survey when this species was discovered.
