= Devario monticola =

Conservation status
- Critically Endangered (IUCN 3.1)

Scientific classification
- Kingdom: Animalia
- Phylum: Chordata
- Class: Actinopterygii
- Order: Cypriniformes
- Family: Danionidae
- Subfamily: Danioninae
- Genus: Devario
- Species: D. monticola

Binomial name
- Devario monticola Batuwita, de Silva & Udugampala

Synonyms
- Danio lineolatus Bleeker, 1863

Species of fish

Devario monticola, is a species of freshwater ray-finned fish belonging to the family Danionidae. It is endemic to Sri Lanka. However, the validity of the species description was noted problematic by several other local ichthyologists.

== Description ==
Body with 4–5 dark irregular vertical bars on anterior half. Danionin notch present. Lateral line complete. Dorsum light yellowish brown with a metallic sheen. Body silvery sheen laterally and ventrally. Vertical bars metallic blue with bright yellowish interspaces. Fins hyaline.

== Ecology ==
It is found from torrential waters of Agra Oya, a tributary of Mahaweli river.
