= Devario fangfangae =

Conservation status
- Least Concern (IUCN 3.1)

Scientific classification
- Kingdom: Animalia
- Phylum: Chordata
- Class: Actinopterygii
- Order: Cypriniformes
- Family: Danionidae
- Subfamily: Danioninae
- Genus: Devario
- Species: D. fangfangae

Binomial name
- Devario fangfangae Kottelat, 2000

Species of fish

Devario fangfangae is a species of freshwater ray-finned fish belonging to the family Danionidae. This species is endemic to the Nam Kading drainage in Laos.
