= Devario deruptotalea =

Scientific classification
- Kingdom: Animalia
- Phylum: Chordata
- Class: Actinopterygii
- Order: Cypriniformes
- Family: Danionidae
- Subfamily: Danioninae
- Genus: Devario
- Species: D. deruptotalea

Binomial name
- Devario deruptotalea Ramananda & Vishwanath, 2014

Species of fish

Devario deruptotalea is a freshwater fish endemic to northeastern India.
