= Devario annandalei =

Conservation status
- Data Deficient (IUCN 3.1)

Scientific classification
- Kingdom: Animalia
- Phylum: Chordata
- Class: Actinopterygii
- Order: Cypriniformes
- Family: Danionidae
- Subfamily: Danioninae
- Genus: Devario
- Species: D. annandalei

Binomial name
- Devario annandalei (B. L. Chaudhuri, 1908)

Synonyms
- Danio annandalei Chaudhuri, 1908

Species of fish

Devario annandalei is a species of freshwater ray-finned fish belonging to the family Danionidae. This fish is found in the Salween, Chao Phraya, and Mekong river basins in Myanmar and Thailand. It grows to 9 cm (3.5 in) standard length.
