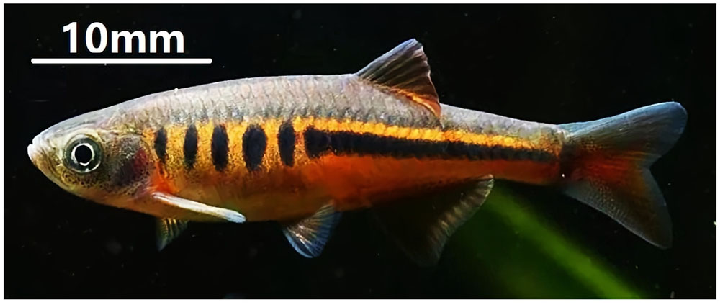

Conservation status
- Data Deficient (IUCN 3.1)

Scientific classification
- Kingdom: Animalia
- Phylum: Chordata
- Class: Actinopterygii
- Order: Cypriniformes
- Family: Danionidae
- Subfamily: Danioninae
- Genus: Devario
- Species: D. interruptus

Binomial name
- Devario interruptus (F. Day, 1870)

Synonyms
- Barilius interruptus Day, 1870; Danio interruptus (Day, 1870)

= Devario interruptus =

Species of fish

Devario interruptus is a species of freshwater ray-finned fish belonging to the family Danionidae, very similar to Devario shanensis. This species is found in the Irrawaddy River basin in Yunnan, China, The fish appears to grow to 5 to 6 cm, the maximum length can reach 7 cm.
