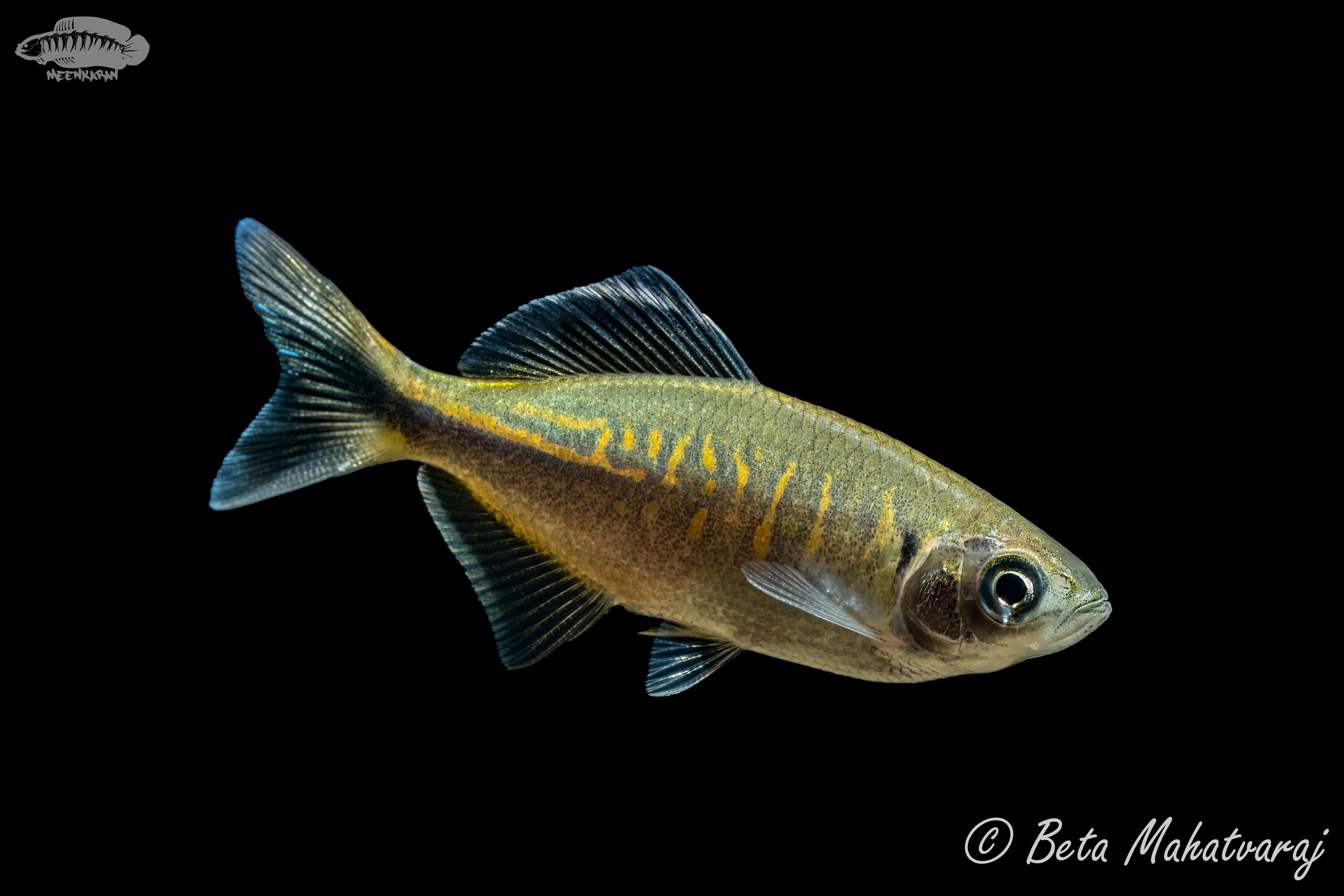

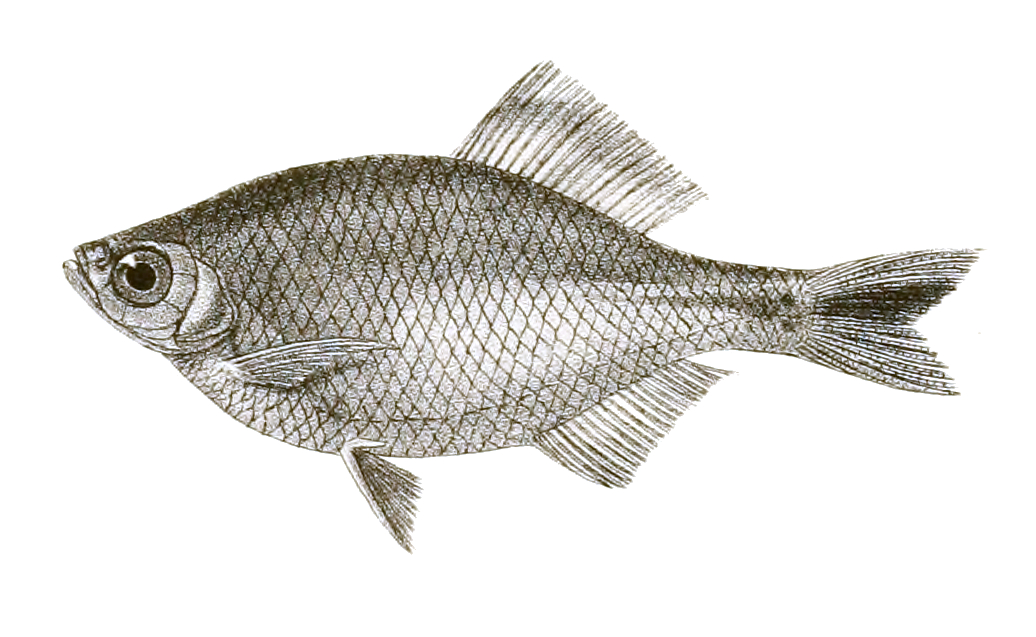

Conservation status
- Least Concern (IUCN 3.1)

Scientific classification
- Domain: Eukaryota
- Kingdom: Animalia
- Phylum: Chordata
- Class: Actinopterygii
- Order: Cypriniformes
- Family: Danionidae
- Subfamily: Danioninae
- Genus: Devario
- Species: D. devario

Binomial name
- Devario devario (F. Hamilton, 1822)

Synonyms
- Cyprinus devario Hamilton, 1822; Danio devario (Hamilton, 1822); Leuciscus devario (Hamilton, 1822); Perilampus devario (Hamilton, 1822); Devario macclellandi Bleeker, 1860

= Bengal danio =

Species of fish

The Bengal danio or Sind danio (Devario devario) is a subtropical fish belonging to the minnow family (Cyprinidae). Originating in Pakistan, India, Nepal, Bangladesh, and Afghanistan, this fish is sometimes kept in community tanks by fish-keeping hobbyists. It grows to a maximum length of 4 in (10 cm).

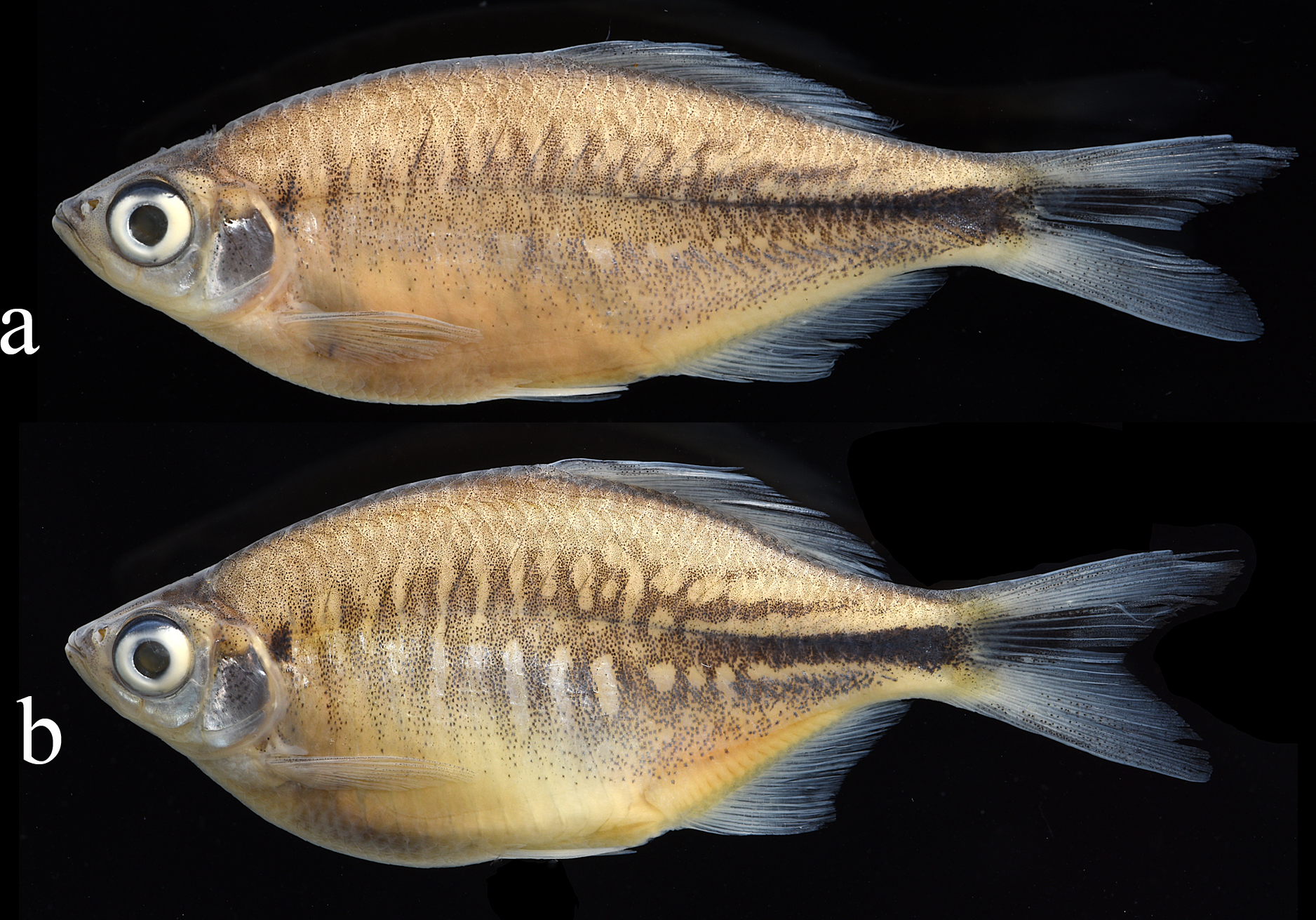
Male (top), female (bottom)

In the wild, the Bengal danio is found in rivers, ponds, and fields in a subtropical climate; it prefers water with a pH of 6.0–8.0, a water hardness of 5.0–19.0 dGH, and an ideal temperature range of 59–79 °F (15–26 °C). Their diets consist of annelid worms, small crustaceans, and insects. The Bengal danio is oviparous.

== See also ==
- List of freshwater aquarium fish species
