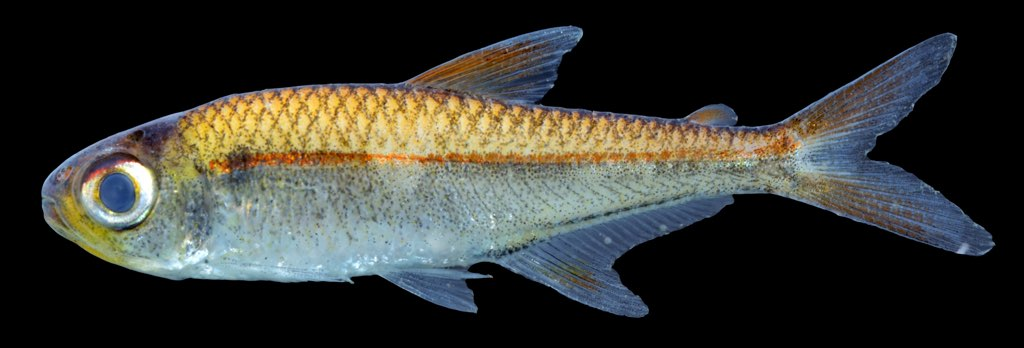

Conservation status
- Data Deficient (IUCN 3.1)

Scientific classification
- Kingdom: Animalia
- Phylum: Chordata
- Class: Actinopterygii
- Order: Characiformes
- Family: Acestrorhamphidae
- Genus: Hemigrammus
- Species: H. elegans

Binomial name
- Hemigrammus elegans (Steindachner, 1882)

Synonyms
- Tetragonopterus elegans Steindachner, 1882

= Hemigrammus elegans =

Species of fish

Hemigrammus elegans is a species of freshwater ray-finned fish belonging to the family Acestrorhamphidae, the American characins. This species has not been recorded since the type series was collected from Obidos on the Amazon River in Brazil in 1882.
