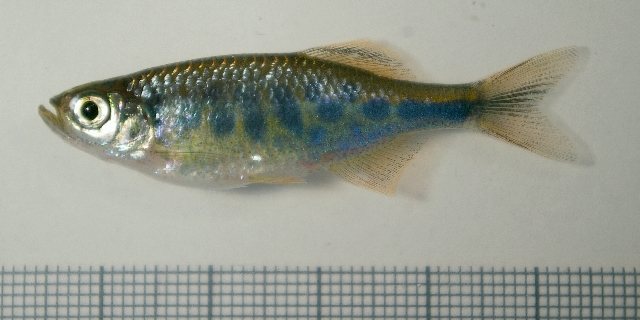

Conservation status
- Endangered (IUCN 3.1)

Scientific classification
- Kingdom: Animalia
- Phylum: Chordata
- Class: Actinopterygii
- Order: Cypriniformes
- Family: Danionidae
- Subfamily: Danioninae
- Genus: Devario
- Species: D. pathirana

Binomial name
- Devario pathirana (Kottelat & Pethiyagoda, 1990)

Synonyms
- Danio pathirana Kottelat & Pethiyagoda, 1990

= Barred danio =

Species of fish

The barred danio (Devario pathirana) is a species of freshwater ray-finned fish belonging to the family Danionidae. Originating in Sri Lanka, this fish grows to a maximum length of 2 inches (5.1 cm).

In the wild, the barred danio is understood to be critically endangered, but is freely available from captive-bred stock. Typically, the fish prefer water with a 6.0-8.0 pH, a water hardness of 5.0-19.0 dGH, and an ideal temperature range of 69–79 °F (21–26 °C). Its diet consists of annelid worms, small crustaceans, and insects. The barred danio is oviparous (an egg layer), and is found mostly in the Nilwala River basin.
