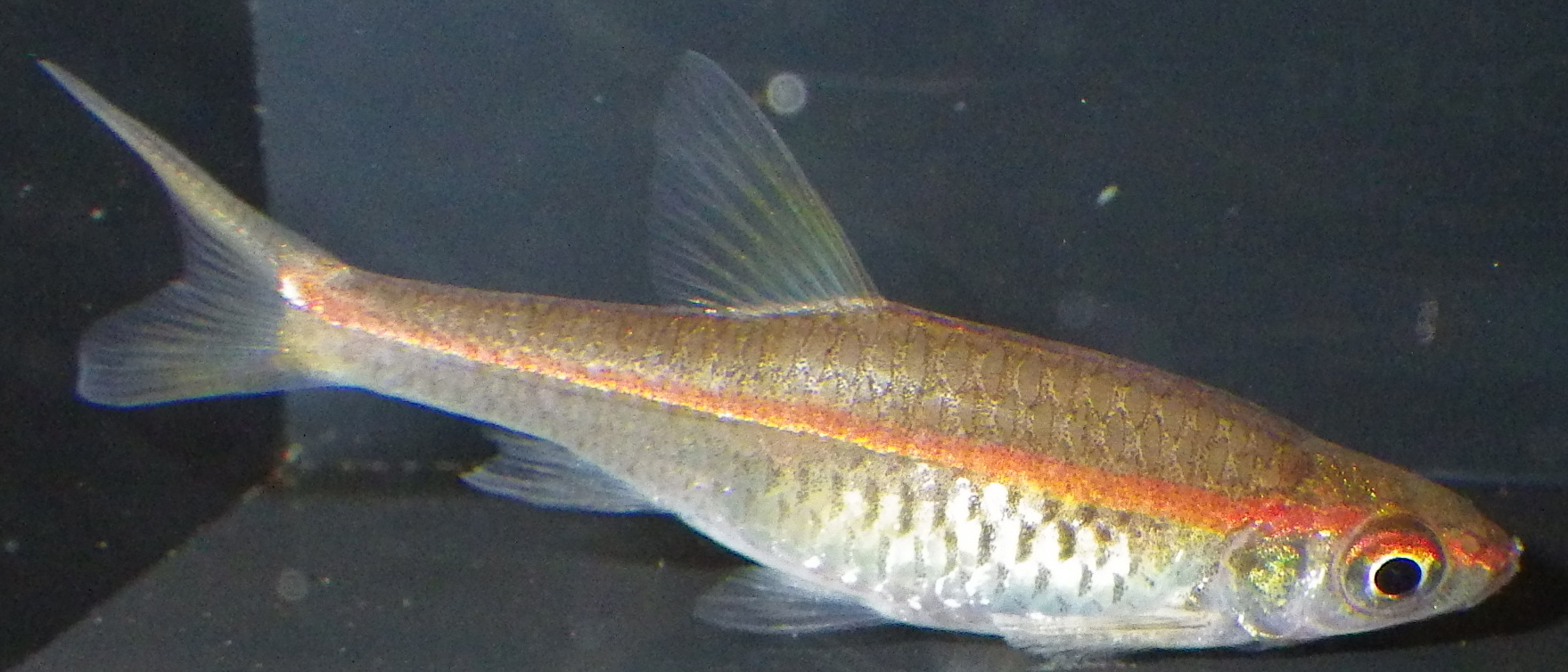
- redstripe rasbora female

Scientific classification
- Kingdom: Animalia
- Phylum: Chordata
- Class: Actinopterygii
- Order: Cypriniformes
- Family: Danionidae
- Subfamily: Rasborinae
- Genus: Trigonopoma; T. Y. Liao, S. O. Kullander & F. Fang, 2010

Type species
- Rasbora pauciperforata Weber & de Beaufort 1915

= Trigonopoma =

Genus of fishes

Trigonopoma is a genus of ray-finned fish belonging to the family Danionidae. The fishes in this genus are found in Southeast Asia.

== Species ==
Trigonopoma contains the following species:

- Trigonopoma gracile (Kottelat, 1991)
- Trigonopoma pauciperforatum (M. C. W. Weber & de Beaufort, 1916) (Redstripe rasbora)
