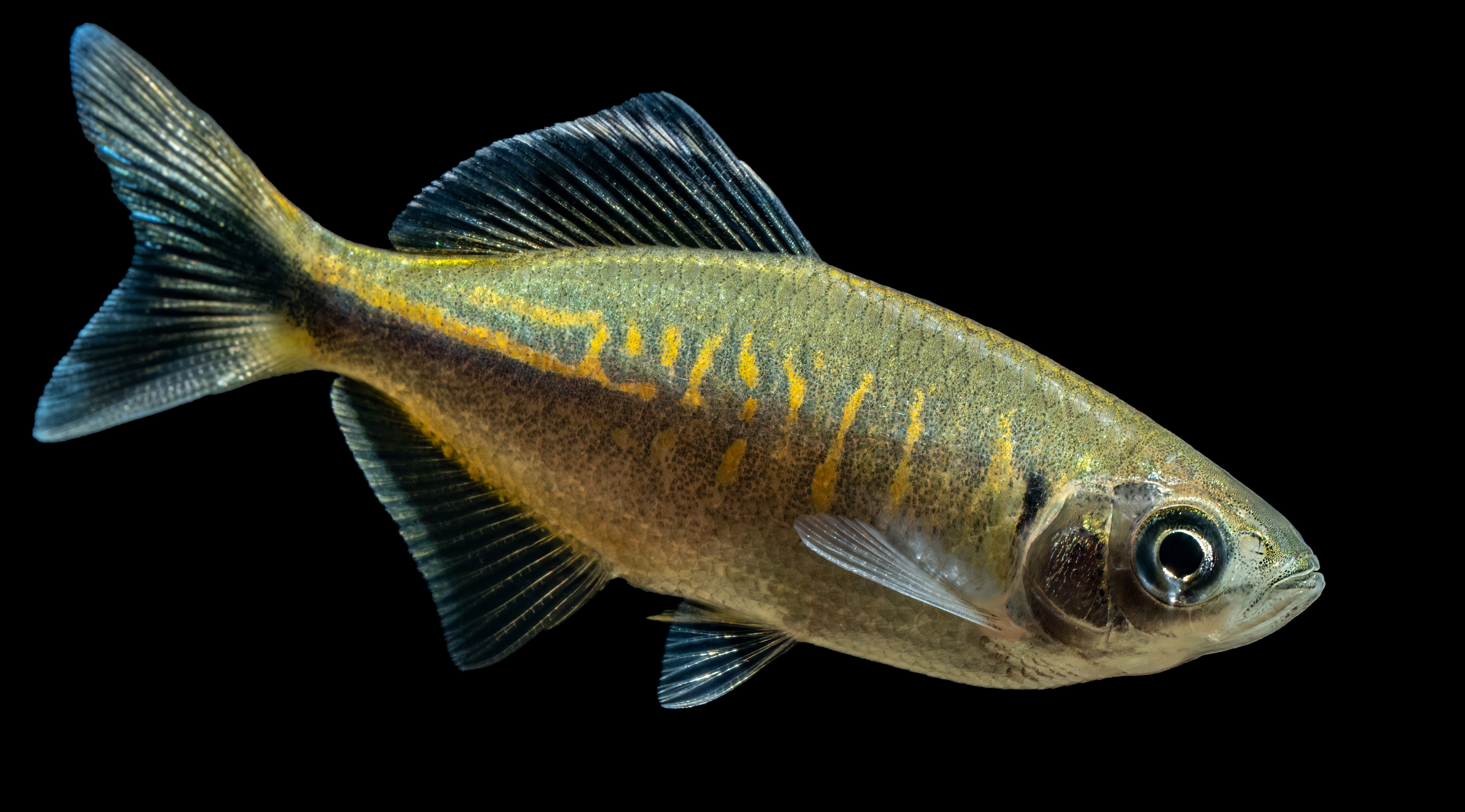
- Bengal danio (Devario devario), the type species of Devario.
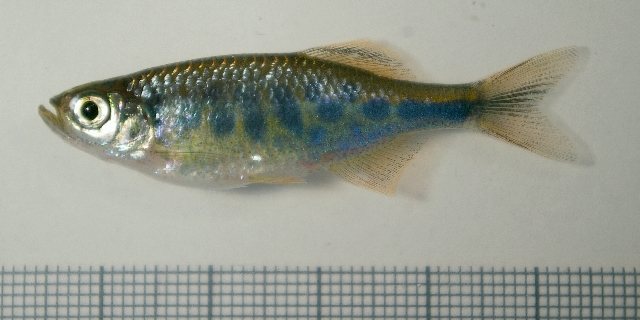
- Devario pathirana

Scientific classification
- Kingdom: Animalia
- Phylum: Chordata
- Class: Actinopterygii
- Order: Cypriniformes
- Family: Danionidae
- Subfamily: Danioninae
- Genus: Devario; Heckel, 1843

Type species
- Cyprinus devario Hamilton, 1822

Synonyms
- Paradanio Day, 1865; Eustira Günther, 1868; Rambaibarnia Fowler, 1934; Danioides X. L. Chu, 1935; Parabarilius Pellegrin & P. W. Fang, 1940; Daniops H. M. Smith, 1945

= Devario =

Genus of fishes

Devario is a genus of fish in the family Danionidae, a family which also contains several other genera of popular freshwater aquarium fish such as Rasbora and Danio.

Devario are native to the rivers and streams of South and Southeast Asia. They have short barbels, with many species having vertical or horizontal stripes. These species consume various small, aquatic insects, crustaceans and worms, as well as, in the case of fry, plankton.

== Species ==
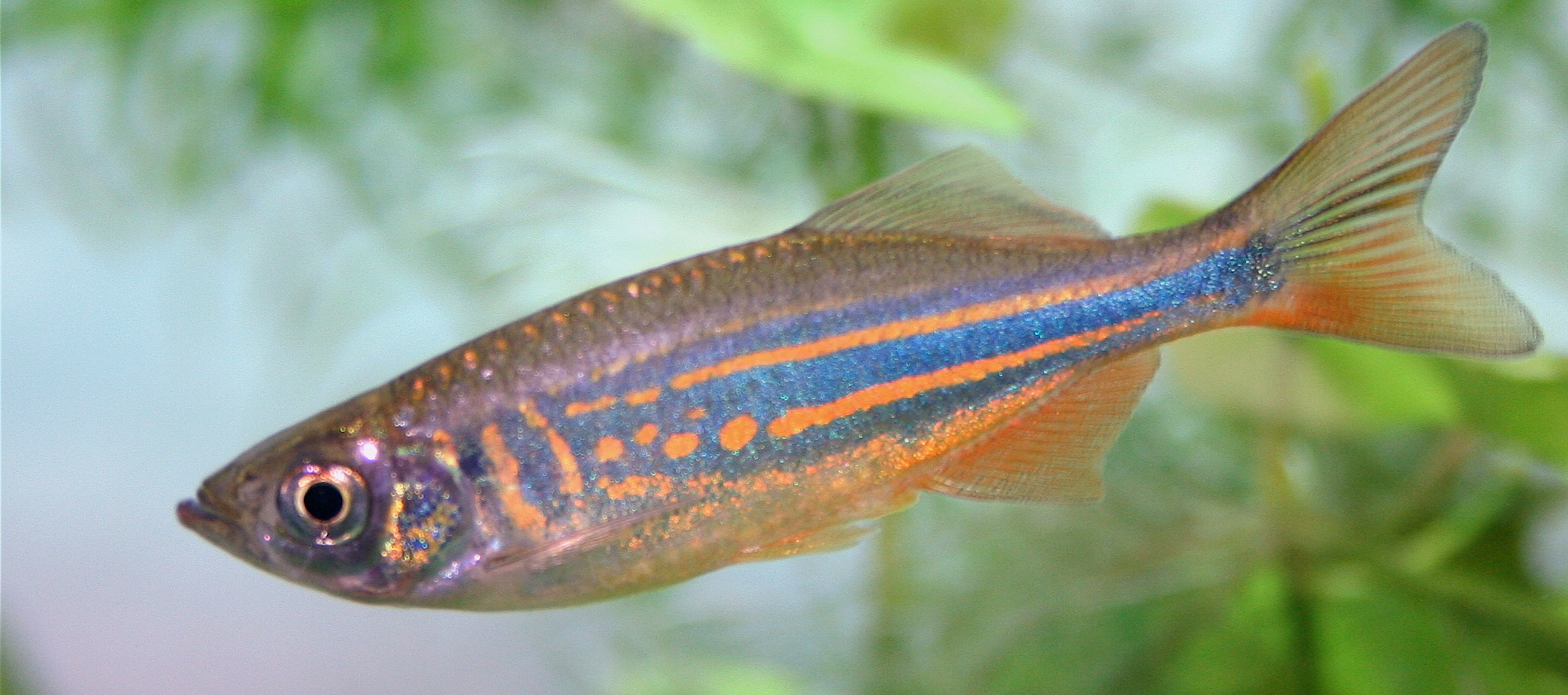
Giant danio (D. aequipinnatus)

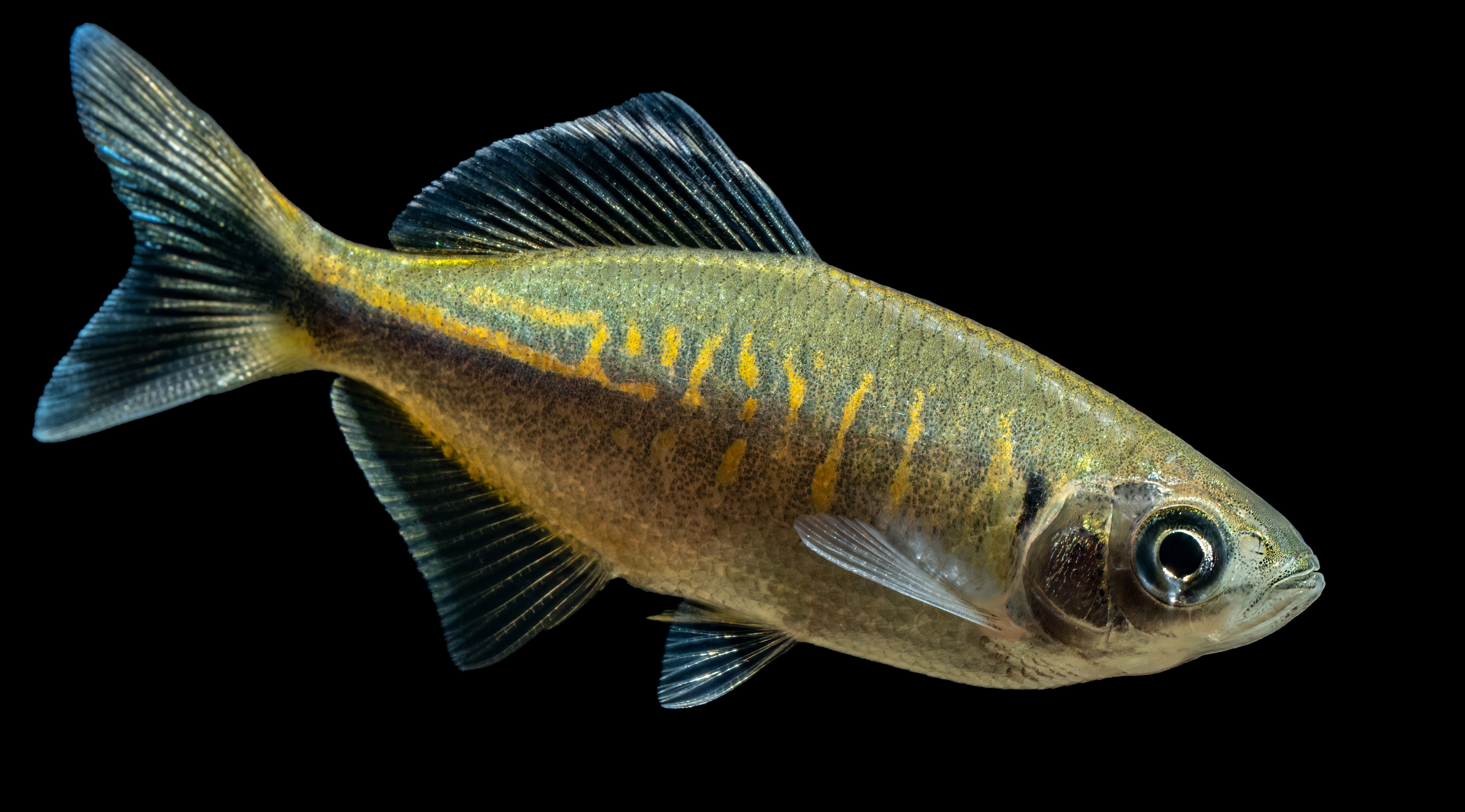
Bengal danio (D. devario)

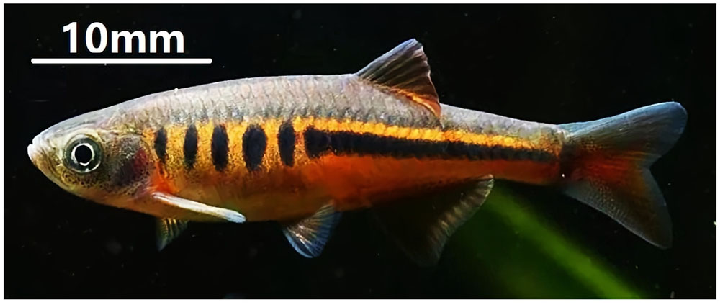
D. interruptus

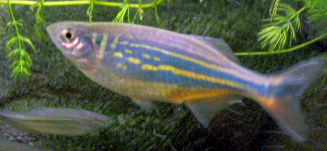
Malabar danio (D. malabarensis)

Devario contains the following species:

- Devario acrostomus (F. Fang & Kottelat, 1999)
- Devario acuticephala (Hora, 1921)
- Devario aequipinnatus (McClelland, 1839) (Giant Danio)
- Devario affinis (Blyth, 1860)
- Devario ahlanderi Kullander & Norén, 2022.
- Devario annandalei (Chaudhuri, 1908).
- Devario anomalus Conway, Mayden & Tang, 2009
- Devario apogon (X. L. Chu, 1981)
- Devario apopyris (F. Fang & Kottelat, 1999)
- Devario assamensis (Barman, 1984)
- Devario browni (Regan, 1907)
- Devario chrysotaeniatus (X. L. Chu 1981)
- Devario coxi Kullander, Rahman, Norén & Mollah, 2017
- Devario deruptotalea Ramananda & Vishwanath, 2014
- Devario devario (Hamilton, 1822) (Bengal danio)
- Devario fangae Kullander, 2017
- Devario fangfangae (Kottelat, 2000)
- Devario fraseri (Hora, 1935) (Fraser's danio)
- Devario gibber (Kottelat, 2000)
- Devario horai (Barman, 1983)
- Devario interruptus (Day, 1870)
- Devario kakhienensis (J. Anderson, 1879)
- Devario kysonensis (Nguyễn, Nguyễn & Mùa, 2010)
- Devario laoensis (Pellegrin & P. W. Fang, 1940)
- Devario leptos (F. Fang & Kottelat 1999)
- Devario malabaricus (Jerdon, 1849) (Malabar danio)
- Devario manipurensis (Barman, 1987)
- Devario memorialis Sudasinghe, Pethiyagoda & Meegaskumbura, 2020 (Aranayake devario)
- Devario micronema (Bleeker, 1863)
- Devario monticola Batuwita, de Silva & Udugampala, 2017 (Mountain danio)
- Devario myitkyinae Kullander, 2017
- Devario naganensis (Chaudhuri, 1912)
- Devario neilgherriensis (Day, 1867) (Nilgiri danio)
- Devario pathirana (Kottelat & Pethiyagoda, 1990) (Barred danio)
- Devario pullatus Kottelat, 2020
- Devario quangbinhensis (T. T. Nguyen, V. T. Le & X. K. Nguyễn, 1999)
- Devario regina (Fowler, 1934) (Queen danio)
- Devario salmonatus (Kottelat, 2000)
- Devario shanensis (Hora, 1928)
- Devario sondhii (Hora & Mukerji, 1934).
- Devario spinosus (Day, 1870)
- Devario strigillifer (Myers, 1924)
- Devario subviridis Kottelat, 2020
- Devario xyrops F. Fang & Kullander, 2009 (Blue moon danio)
- Devario yuensis (Arunkumar & Tombi Singh, 1998)
