= Devario chrysotaeniatus =

Conservation status
- Data Deficient (IUCN 3.1)

Scientific classification
- Kingdom: Animalia
- Phylum: Chordata
- Class: Actinopterygii
- Order: Cypriniformes
- Family: Danionidae
- Subfamily: Danioninae
- Genus: Devario
- Species: D. chrysotaeniatus

Binomial name
- Devario chrysotaeniatus (X. L. Chu, 1981)

Synonyms
- Danio chrysotaeniatus X.L. Chu, 1981

Species of fish

Devario chrysotaeniatus, commonly called the gold-striped danio, is a species of freshwater ray-finned fish belonging to the family Danionidae. Originating in China and Laos in the upper Mekong river, this fish is very rarely found in community tanks by fish-keeping hobbyists. It grows to a maximum length of 3 inches (7.5 cm).

== See also ==
- List of freshwater aquarium fish species
