= Devario gibber =

Conservation status
- Least Concern (IUCN 3.1)

Scientific classification
- Kingdom: Animalia
- Phylum: Chordata
- Class: Actinopterygii
- Order: Cypriniformes
- Family: Danionidae
- Subfamily: Danioninae
- Genus: Devario
- Species: D. gibber

Binomial name
- Devario gibber Kottelat, 2000

Synonyms
- Danio gibber Kottelat, 2000

Species of fish

Devario gibber is a freshwater fish endemic to the Xe Kong and Xe Don basins in Laos. It occurs in stone-bottomed, clear streams with moderately fast to rapidly flowing water, and is uncommon in floodplains. It is caught in local subsistence fisheries, but not believed to be substantially impacted by them.
