= Pristella ariporo =

Conservation status
- Least Concern (IUCN 3.1)

Scientific classification
- Kingdom: Animalia
- Phylum: Chordata
- Class: Actinopterygii
- Order: Characiformes
- Family: Acestrorhamphidae
- Genus: Pristella
- Species: P. ariporo

Binomial name
- Pristella ariporo Conde-Saldaña, Albornoz-Garzón, García-Melo, Villa-Navarro, Mirande & F. C. T. Lima, 2019

Species of fish

Pristella ariporo, the X-ray tetra, is a species of freshwater ray-finned fish belonging to the family Acestrorhamphidae, the American characins. This species is found in the basin of the Orinoco in Colombia, and in Venezuela.
