= Devario kysonensis =

Scientific classification
- Domain: Eukaryota
- Kingdom: Animalia
- Phylum: Chordata
- Class: Actinopterygii
- Order: Cypriniformes
- Family: Danionidae
- Subfamily: Danioninae
- Genus: Devario
- Species: D. kysonensis

Binomial name
- Devario kysonensis (Nguyễn, Nguyễn & Mùa, 2010)

Synonyms
- Danio kysonensis Nguyen, Nguyen & Mua, 2010

Species of fish

Devario kysonensis is a freshwater fish endemic to Nghệ An Province, Vietnam.
