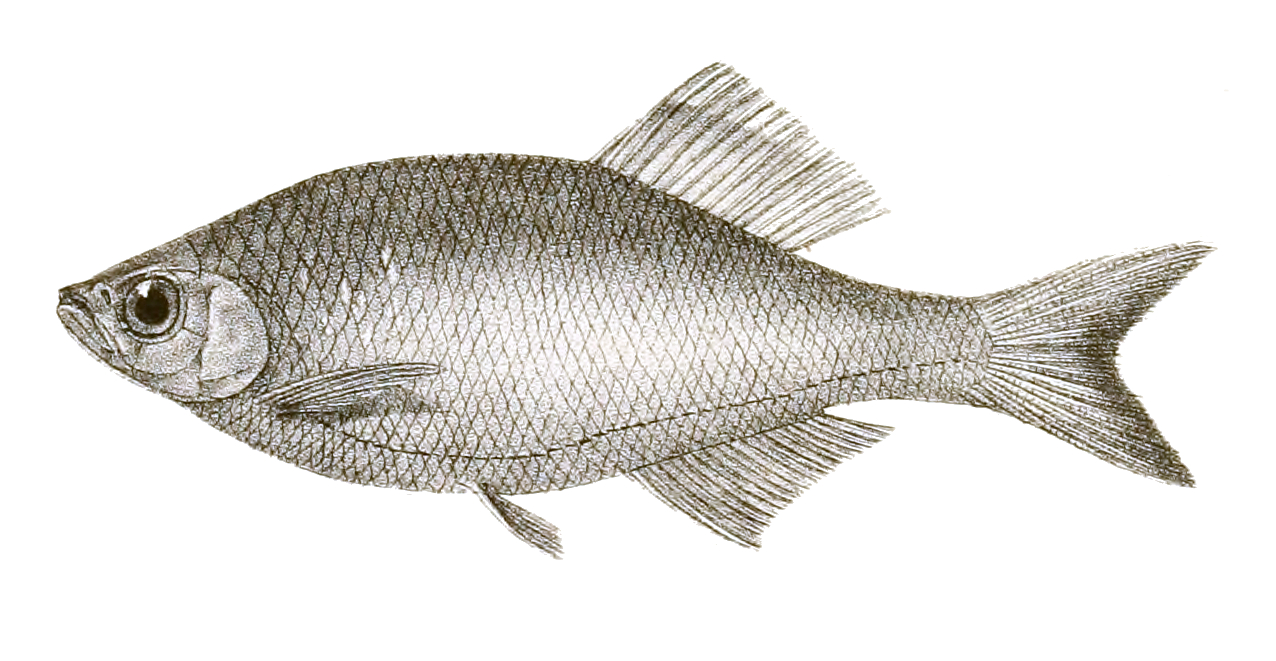

Scientific classification
- Kingdom: Animalia
- Phylum: Chordata
- Class: Actinopterygii
- Order: Cypriniformes
- Family: Danionidae
- Subfamily: Danioninae
- Genus: Devario
- Species: D. spinosus

Binomial name
- Devario spinosus (Day, 1870)

Synonyms
- Danio spinosus Day, 1870

= Devario spinosus =

Species of fish

Devario spinosus is a species of freshwater ray-finned fish belonging to the family Danionidae. This fish is endemic to Myanmar.
