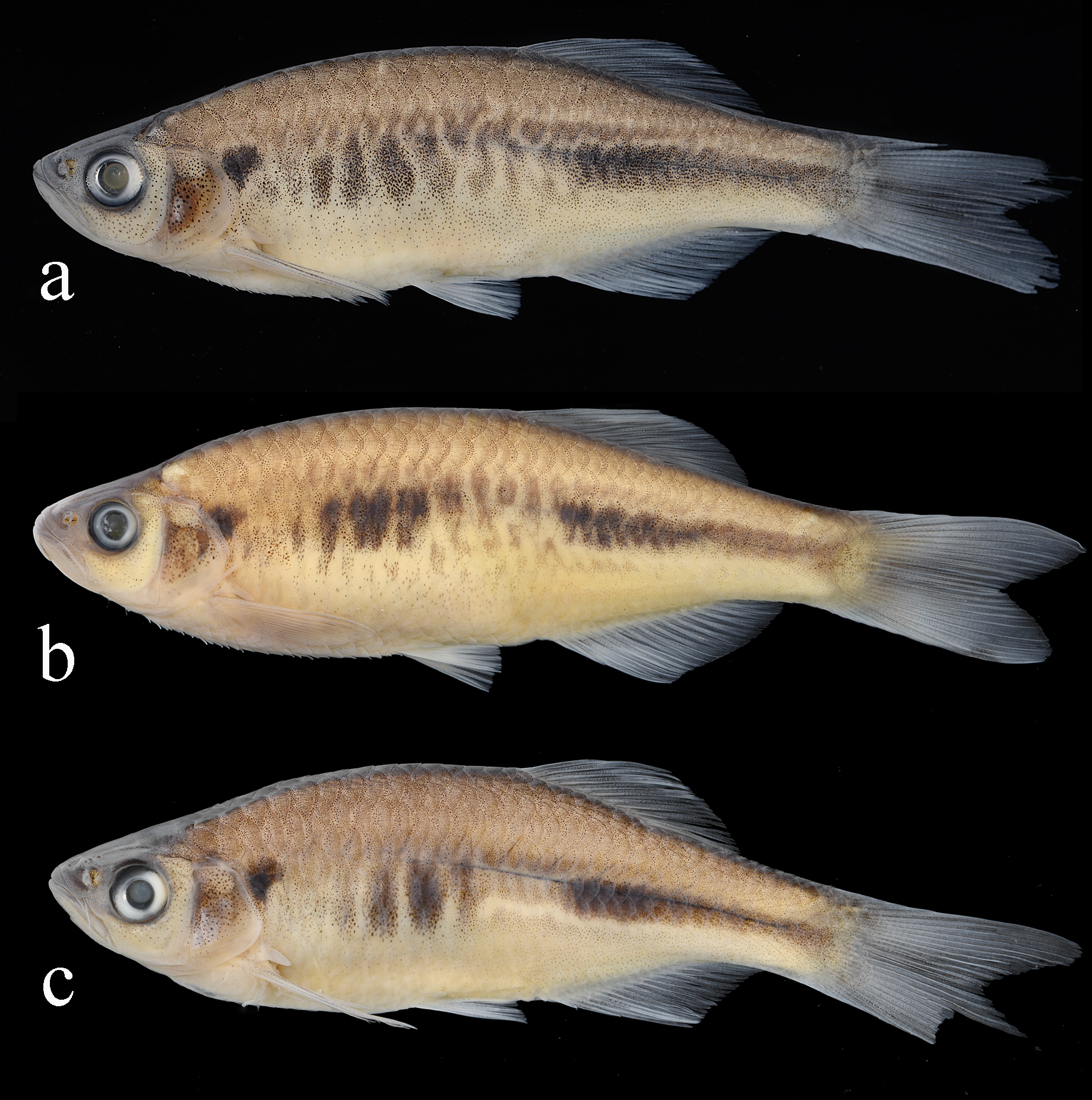

Conservation status
- Vulnerable (IUCN 3.1)

Scientific classification
- Kingdom: Animalia
- Phylum: Chordata
- Class: Actinopterygii
- Order: Cypriniformes
- Family: Danionidae
- Subfamily: Danioninae
- Genus: Devario
- Species: D. anomalus

Binomial name
- Devario anomalus Conway, Mayden & Tang, 2009

= Devario anomalus =

Species of fish

Devario anomalus is a freshwater fish endemic to Bangladesh.
