= Devario micronema =

Conservation status
- Endangered (IUCN 3.1)

Scientific classification
- Kingdom: Animalia
- Phylum: Chordata
- Class: Actinopterygii
- Order: Cypriniformes
- Family: Danionidae
- Subfamily: Danioninae
- Genus: Devario
- Species: D. micronema

Binomial name
- Devario micronema (Bleeker, 1863)

Synonyms
- Danio micronema Bleeker, 1863; Devario annnataliae Batuwita, de Silva & Udugampala, 2017; Devario udenii Batuwita, de Silva & Udugampala, 2017

Species of fish

Devario micronema is a species of freshwater ray-finned fish belonging to the family Danionidae. It is endemic to Sri Lanka. However, the validity of the species description was noted problematic by several other local ichthyologists.

== Description ==
Body with 3–5 irregular vertical bars on anterior half. There are 14–17 pre-dorsal scales and 10–11 branched dorsal-fin rays. Danionin notch present. Lateral line complete. There is a prominent square-shaped process on its first infraorbital. Dorsum light yellowish brown with a metallic sheen. Body silvery sheen laterally and ventrally. Vertical bars metallic blue with bright yellowish interspaces. Fins hyaline.

== Ecology ==
It is found from well-shaded areas of shallow, slow moving streams of Kitulgala area closer to Kelani Valley Forest Reserve.
