= Devario strigillifer =

Conservation status
- Data Deficient (IUCN 3.1)

Scientific classification
- Kingdom: Animalia
- Phylum: Chordata
- Class: Actinopterygii
- Order: Cypriniformes
- Family: Danionidae
- Subfamily: Danioninae
- Genus: Devario
- Species: D. strigillifer

Binomial name
- Devario strigillifer (G. S. Myers, 1924)

Synonyms
- Danio strigillifer Myers, 1924

Species of fish

Devario strigillifer is a species of danio endemic to Myanmar where it is found in shallow, fast-running streams the area of Myitkyina District. This species grows to a length of 10 cm (3.9 in) SL.
