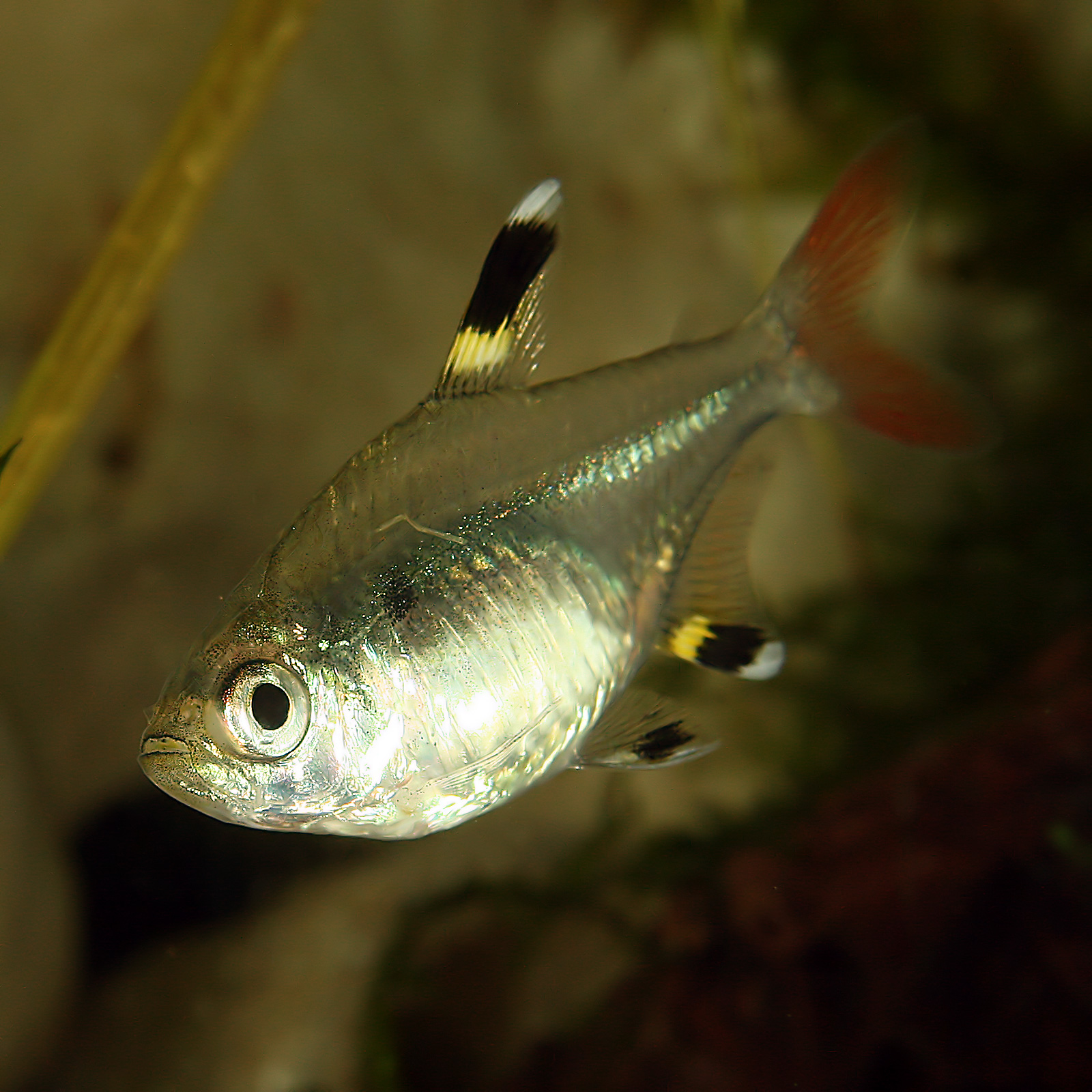
- Pristella maxillaris

Scientific classification
- Kingdom: Animalia
- Phylum: Chordata
- Class: Actinopterygii
- Division: Teleostei
- Order: Characiformes
- Family: Acestrorhamphidae
- Subfamily: Pristellinae; Géry & Boutière, 1964

Type genus
- Pristella C. H. Eigenmann, 1870

Genera
- See text

= Pristellinae =

Subfamily of fishes

Pristellinae is a subfamily of freshwater ray-finned fishes belonging to the family Acestrorhamphidae, the American characins. The fishes in this subfamily are found in South America.

== Genera ==
Pristellinae contains the following genera:

- Gymnocorymbus C. H. Eigenmann, 1908
- Hemigrammus Gill, 1858
- Pristella C. H. Eigenmann, 1908
