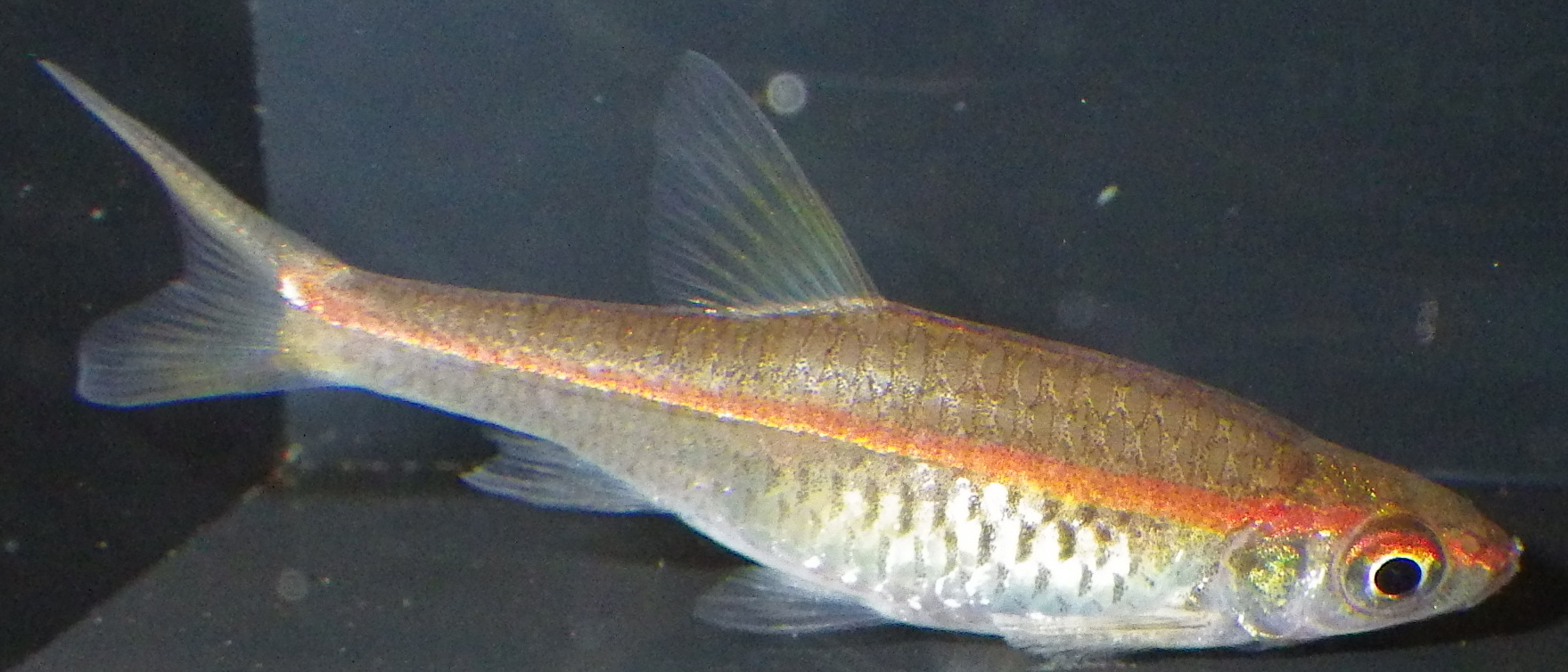

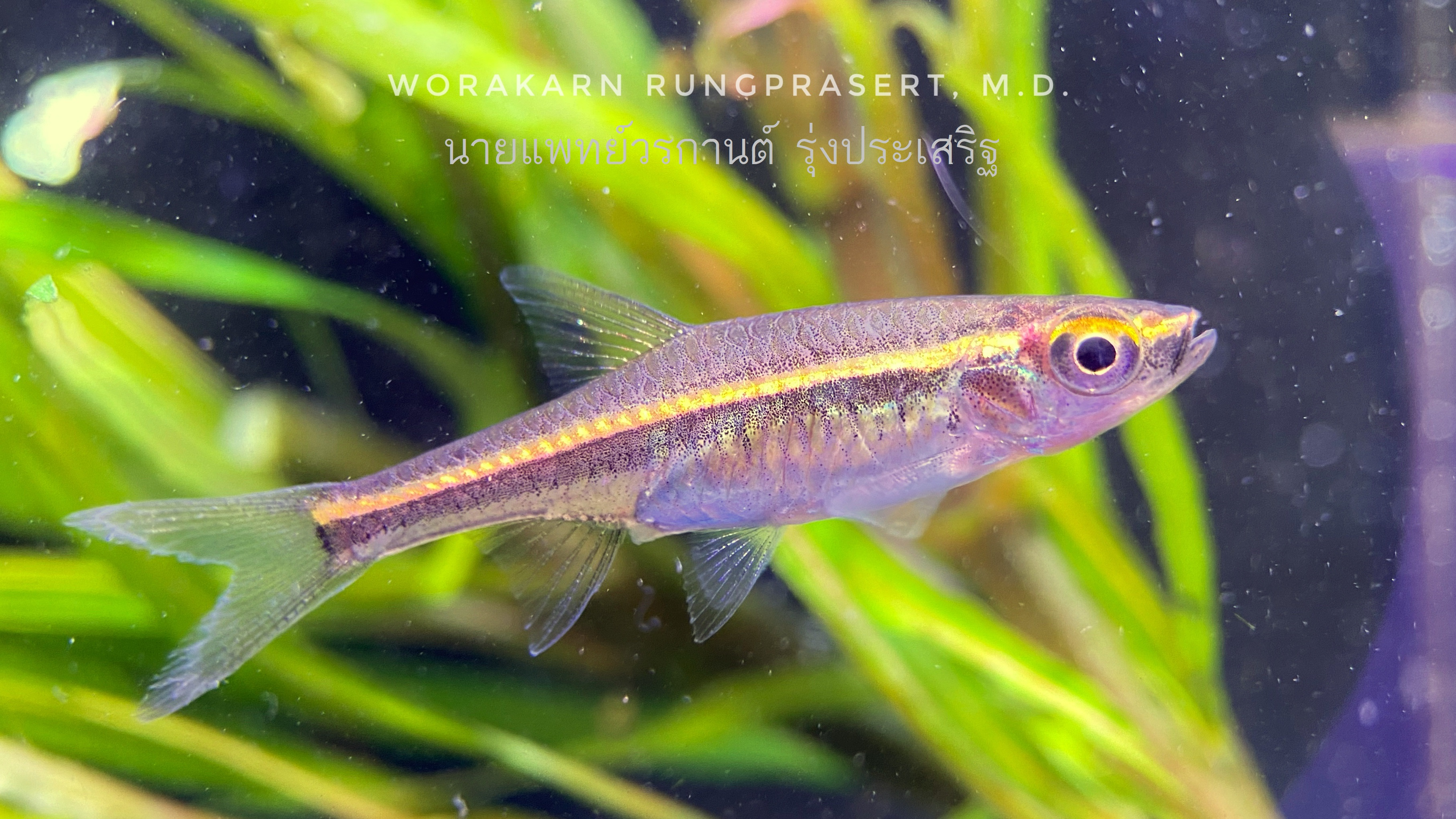

Conservation status
- Least Concern (IUCN 3.1)

Scientific classification
- Kingdom: Animalia
- Phylum: Chordata
- Class: Actinopterygii
- Order: Cypriniformes
- Family: Danionidae
- Subfamily: Rasborinae
- Genus: Trigonopoma
- Species: T. pauciperforata

Binomial name
- Trigonopoma pauciperforata (M. C. W. Weber & de Beaufort, 1916)

Synonyms
- Rasbora pauciperforata Weber & de Beaufort, 1916; Rasbora agilis Ahl, 1937; Rasbora vietnamensis Vasil'eva & Vasil'ev, 2013

= Redstripe rasbora =

Species of fish

The redstripe rasbora (Trigonopoma pauciperforata) is a small species of cyprinidfish found in freshwater in Southeast Asia.
