= Devario affinis =

Conservation status
- Data Deficient (IUCN 3.1)

Scientific classification
- Kingdom: Animalia
- Phylum: Chordata
- Class: Actinopterygii
- Order: Cypriniformes
- Family: Danionidae
- Subfamily: Danioninae
- Genus: Devario
- Species: D. affinis

Binomial name
- Devario affinis (Blyth, 1860)

Synonyms
- Perilampus affinis Blyth, 1860

Species of fish

Devario affinis is a species of freshwater ray-finned fish belonging to the family Danionidae. This species is found in India, which grows up to 8 cm (3.1 in) in length.
