= Devario kakhienensis =

Conservation status
- Data Deficient (IUCN 3.1)

Scientific classification
- Kingdom: Animalia
- Phylum: Chordata
- Class: Actinopterygii
- Order: Cypriniformes
- Family: Danionidae
- Subfamily: Danioninae
- Genus: Devario
- Species: D. kakhienensis

Binomial name
- Devario kakhienensis (J. Anderson, 1879)

Synonyms
- Danio kakhienensis J. Anderson, 1879)

Species of fish

Devario kakhienensis is a freshwater fish found in the Irrawaddy basin of Myanmar and China.
