= Devario shanensis =

Conservation status
- Data Deficient (IUCN 3.1)

Scientific classification
- Kingdom: Animalia
- Phylum: Chordata
- Class: Actinopterygii
- Order: Cypriniformes
- Family: Danionidae
- Subfamily: Danioninae
- Genus: Devario
- Species: D. shanensis

Binomial name
- Devario shanensis (Hora, 1928)

Synonyms
- Brachydanio shanensis (Hora, 1928); Danio shanensis Hora, 1928

Species of fish

Devario shanensis is a species of freshwater ray-finned fish belonging to the family Danionidae. This species is found in the Irrawaddy and Salween River basins.
