= Dither fish =

The term dither fish refers to an arbitrary group of aquarium fish, commonly used by aquarists, to help reduce innate timidity and aggression as well as to promote normal social behaviour in the other fish housed within the same aquarium.

== Overview ==
Dither fish help reduce anxiety of some nervous species of fish by allowing the fearful species to see that it is safe to leave cover and eat the food that has been given to them. Commonly used dither fish are typical schooling species, such as some Danio, barb and tetra species, and are most often used in cichlid tanks. Other dither fish used include liverbearers, rasboras, corydoras, rainbowfish, hatchetfish, and pencilfish. Choice of which dither fish is used is dependent on the fish currently present and the issue trying to be solved.

== Behavior ==
Dither fish are typically fish that swim around the top of a tank, a behavior that reassures more timid fish that no predators are nearby, and are found naturally in the same habitat as the other fish in the aquarium, thereby encouraging them to relax and engage in normal behavior. This technique relies on the ability of cichlids in an aquarium to gauge environmental security by observing the behaviour of other fish species.

Due to the dependency of what the aquarist wants more out of their aquarium, dither fish are expected to be more placid and nonaggressive. They set an example and demonstrate the relaxed atmosphere of their designated aquarium.

== Example species ==
Many aquarists have different species they consider to be dither fish; the more commonly associated ones include: Tetras, rasboras, and danios. Their variety in color and movement can also bring about an appealing visual to the aquarium. The glowlight danio is a commonly brought in fish for its colorful scales and frequent activity within their schools.
