= Devario browni =

Conservation status
- Vulnerable (IUCN 3.1)

Scientific classification
- Kingdom: Animalia
- Phylum: Chordata
- Class: Actinopterygii
- Order: Cypriniformes
- Family: Danionidae
- Subfamily: Danioninae
- Genus: Devario
- Species: D. browni

Binomial name
- Devario browni (Regan, 1907)

Synonyms
- Danio browni Regan, 1907

Species of fish

Devario browni is a species of fish in the family Cyprinidae found in fast-flowing, shaded streams in the Salween River drainage; it feeds mainly on terrestrial insects, including ants and flies.
