= Albert B. Ulrey =

American marine biologist

Albert Brennus Ulrey was a marine biologist, born in North Manchester, Indiana, December 31, 1860 and died 21 December 1932 in Los Angeles, California.

== Personal life ==
Ulrey married Florence Katherine Speicher (1883–1966) on 15 November 1900.

== Career ==
He was the first biology instructor at Manchester University in Indiana, joining the faculty in 1894. Later, in the early 20th Century, in 1901 Albert Ulrey became the first director of the Venice Marine Biological Station of the University of Southern California. He published a marine biology article in 1918 as Director of the Venice Marine Biological Station of the University of Southern California (USC) in the Bulletin of the Southern California Academy of Sciences that was entitled: The Starfishes of Southern California.

== Fish named for him ==
The Hyphessobrycon ulreyi is named after him.

== Publications ==
- “A Review of the Embioticidae,” Bulletin of the Bureau of Fisheries (V. 25 1905), Volume 12 (1894)
- “The Marine Fishes of Southern California,” Bulletin of the Southern California Academy of Sciences, Volumes 21-24 (1922)
