= List of danionin species by common name =

Since 2004 many new danionins have been discovered which do not yet have scientific names and many other species, previously known only to the scientific community, have become available in aquarist shops. This has predictably led to total confusion as to the naming of some fish, with some species having up to five different common names in use and some common names being used for up to four different species.

All common names currently in use for danionins are listed below in alphabetical order. Click on the common name for the correct identity and further details of each fish. The suffix danio is almost always used for common names, although the suffix devario is sometimes in practice used for danionins in the genus Devario.

- Assam danio
- Annandale's giant danio
- Blood red danio
- Barred danio
- Bengal danio
- Black-barred danio
- Blue danio
- Blue moon danio
- Blue-redstripe danio
- Blue ring danio
- Burma danio
- Burma zebra danio
- Canton danio
- Chain danio
- China danio
- Cheetah danio
- Crescendo danio
- Dadio
- Dwarf danio
- False giant danio
- Feegrade danio
- Fire bar danio
- Fire ring danio
- Fraser's danio
- Galaxy rasbora
- Giant danio
- Glass fish
- Glowlight danio
- Goldring danio
- Gold striped danio
- Hikari danio
- Indian flying barb
- Indian glass barb
- Kakhyen Hills danio
- Kedah danio
- Kerr's danio
- KP01 danio
- Lake Inle danio
- Laos giant danio
- Leaping barb
- Leopard danio
- Malayan flying barb
- Meghalaya danio
- Magdalena danio
- Mekong flying barb
- Mirik red danio
- Moustached danio
- Naga Hills danio
- Neon danio
- Neon hatchet fish
- Neilgherry Hills giant danio
- Northern glowlight danio
- Ocelot danio
- Orange finned zebra danio
- Panther danio
- Pearl danio
- Putao danio
- Queen danio
- Rakhine danio
- Rainbow danio
- Redfin danio
- Redline giant danio
- Rocket danio
- Rose danio
- Rosy danio
- Shan danio
- Sharp headed danio
- Shillong danio
- Sind danio
- Sondhi's danio
- South Indian flying barb
- Spotted danio
- Striped flying barb
- Sweetlips danio
- Tribal danio
- Turquoise danio
- TW01 danio
- TW02 danio
- TW03 danio
- Vietnamese cardinal minnow
- White Cloud Mountain minnow
- Yoma danio
- Yoma 2 danio
- Zebra danio

== See also ==
- Danionins - Comprehensive guide to Danios, Devarios and associated species.
