= Fire ring danio =

The common name for the fish fire ring danio is given by the aquatics trade to the following species of Danio:

- Danio sp aff kyathit – Redfin danio

Less commonly, the name has also on occasion been applied to these species:

- Orange finned zebra danio (Danio kyathit striped morph)
- Panther danio (Danio aesculapii)

== See also ==
- Danios
