= Danio htamanthinus =

Scientific classification
- Kingdom: Animalia
- Phylum: Chordata
- Class: Actinopterygii
- Order: Cypriniformes
- Family: Danionidae
- Subfamily: Danioninae
- Genus: Danio
- Species: D. htamanthinus

Binomial name
- Danio htamanthinus Kullander and Norén, 2016

Species of fish

Danio htamanthinus is a small species of ray finned freshwater fish from the family Danionidae, the danios, which was described in 2016 from small streams in the area of Htamanthi on the middle Chindwin River in Myanmar. It is most similar to D. choprae and D. flagrans from the Irrawaddy River drainage.
