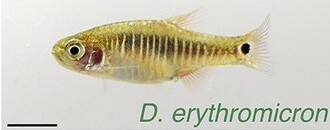

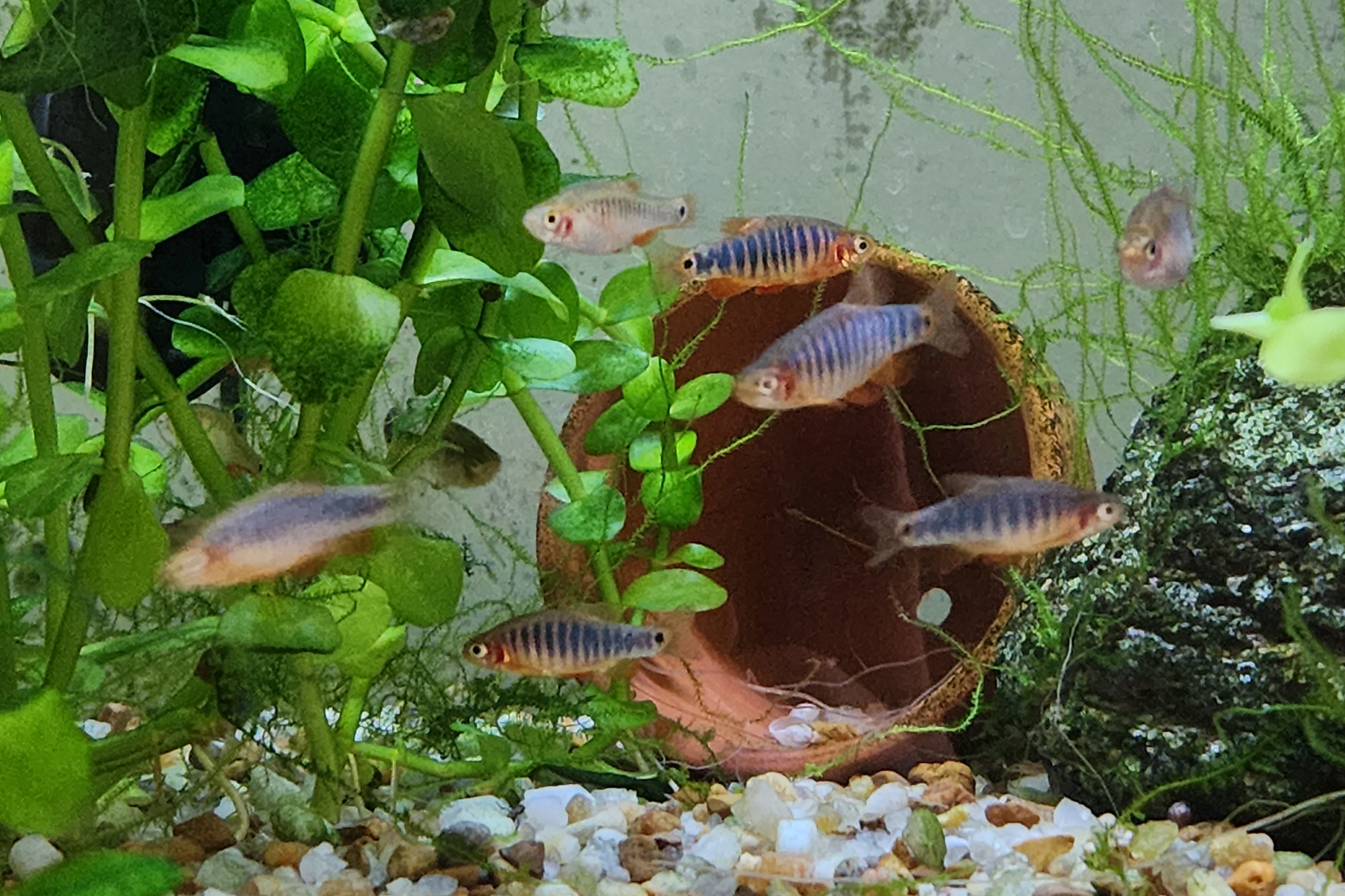

Conservation status
- Endangered (IUCN 3.1)

Scientific classification
- Kingdom: Animalia
- Phylum: Chordata
- Class: Actinopterygii
- Order: Cypriniformes
- Family: Danionidae
- Subfamily: Danioninae
- Genus: Danio
- Species: D. erythromicron

Binomial name
- Danio erythromicron (Annandale, 1918)

Synonyms
- Microrasbora erythromicron Annandale, 1918

= Danio erythromicron =

Species of fish

Danio erythromicron, often known as emerald dwarf danio and emerald dwarf rasbora, is a species of freshwater ray-finned fish belonging to the family Danionidae. This fish is endemic to Inle Lake in Myanmar.

== Taxonomy and systematics ==
In 1999, it was suggested that the species be transferred to the genus Danio based on morphological data, but it was cautioned that more research would be necessary. A phylogenetic analysis of Danio found it indeed close to that genus, but its precise placement was still indeterminable. Shortly thereafter, a new species, Danio margaritatus, was described under the name Celestichthys margaritatus. However, this new species was quickly moved into Danio following further analysis. Subsequent analysis of DNA sequence data showed that Microrasbora erythromicron was related to Danio, and recommended moving this species to that genus. Later molecular analysis confirmed its placement within the genus, with its closest relatives being Danio margaritatus and Danio choprai.
