= Burma zebra danio =

Scientific classification
- Domain: Eukaryota
- Kingdom: Animalia
- Phylum: Chordata
- Class: Actinopterygii
- Order: Cypriniformes
- Family: Danionidae
- Subfamily: Danioninae
- Genus: Danio
- Species: D. sp. KP01

Binomial name
- Danio sp. KP01

Species of fish

The Burma zebra danio or KP01 danio is a tropical fish belonging to the minnow family (Cyprinidae). It is believed to originate in Myanmar. This fish was discovered in 2006 and is believed to be a separate species from the zebra danio (which occurs many miles away in India) to which it has a close resemblance. However, it is more likely to be closely related to the Yoma danio (also from Myanmar), and is believed to be a similar size, 6–9 cm, to the latter.

In the wild, the Burma zebra danio is likely found in rivers in a tropical climate and prefer water with a 6.5 - 7.0 pH, a water hardness of 5.0 - 12.0 dGH, and an ideal temperature range of 75–82 °F (24–28 °C). The Burma zebra danio is oviparous (an egg layer).

== See also ==
- List of freshwater aquarium fish species
- Danio
- Danionins
