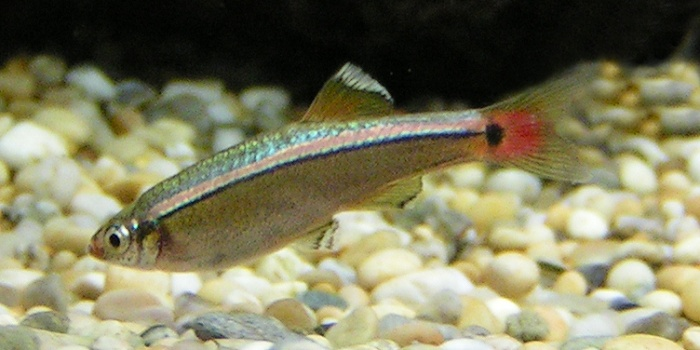
- T. albonubes

Scientific classification
- Kingdom: Animalia
- Phylum: Chordata
- Class: Actinopterygii
- Order: Cypriniformes
- Family: Tanichthyidae; Mayden & W.J. Chen, 2010
- Genus: Tanichthys; Lin, 1932

Type species
- Tanichthys albonubes Lin, 1932

Species
- See text

= Tanichthys =

Genus of fishes

Tanichthys is a genus of freshwater cypriniform fish, monotypic in the family Tanichthyidae. Its species are native to rivers and streams in southern China and Vietnam.

== Etymology ==
The name Tanichthys is a combination of Tan and ichthys. Tan is a Chinese surname, and is taken from the Chinese boy scout leader Tan Kam Fei, who discovered the first specimen. Ichthys means "fish" in Greek.

== Species ==
Until the turn of the century, the type species, T. albonubes, was the only one known. In 2001, however, Jörg Freyhof and Fabian Herder described a new and very similar species, T. micagemmae, from the Ben Hai River in Vietnam. A third species was described, also in Vietnam, in 2019.

In 2022, deep genetic divergences were found among the various populations of T. albonubes in southern China (despite there being only subtle morphological disparities), resulting in the split of this species into 7. Hence, currently, this genus contains 9 species in total; these are listed below:

- Tanichthys albiventris Li, Bohlen & Liao, 2022
- Tanichthys albonubes Lin, 1932 (white cloud mountain minnow)
- Tanichthys flavianalis Li, Liao & Shen, 2022
- Tanichthys guipingensis Jin, Li & Zhao, 2022
- Tanichthys huidongensis Jin, Li & Zhao, 2022
- Tanichthys kuehnei Bohlen, Dvorák, Thang & Šlechtová, 2019
- Tanichthys luheensis Jin, Li & Zhao, 2022
- Tanichthys micagemmae Freyhof & Herder, 2001 (Vietnamese cardinal minnow)
- Tanichthys shenzhenensis Jin, Li & Zhao, 2022
