= Danio catenatus =

Scientific classification
- Kingdom: Animalia
- Phylum: Chordata
- Class: Actinopterygii
- Order: Cypriniformes
- Family: Danionidae
- Subfamily: Danioninae
- Genus: Danio
- Species: D. catenatus

Binomial name
- Danio catenatus S. O. Kullander, 2015

Species of fish

Danio catenatus is a species of Danio found in the Thandwe Chaung River drainage in Myanmar.
