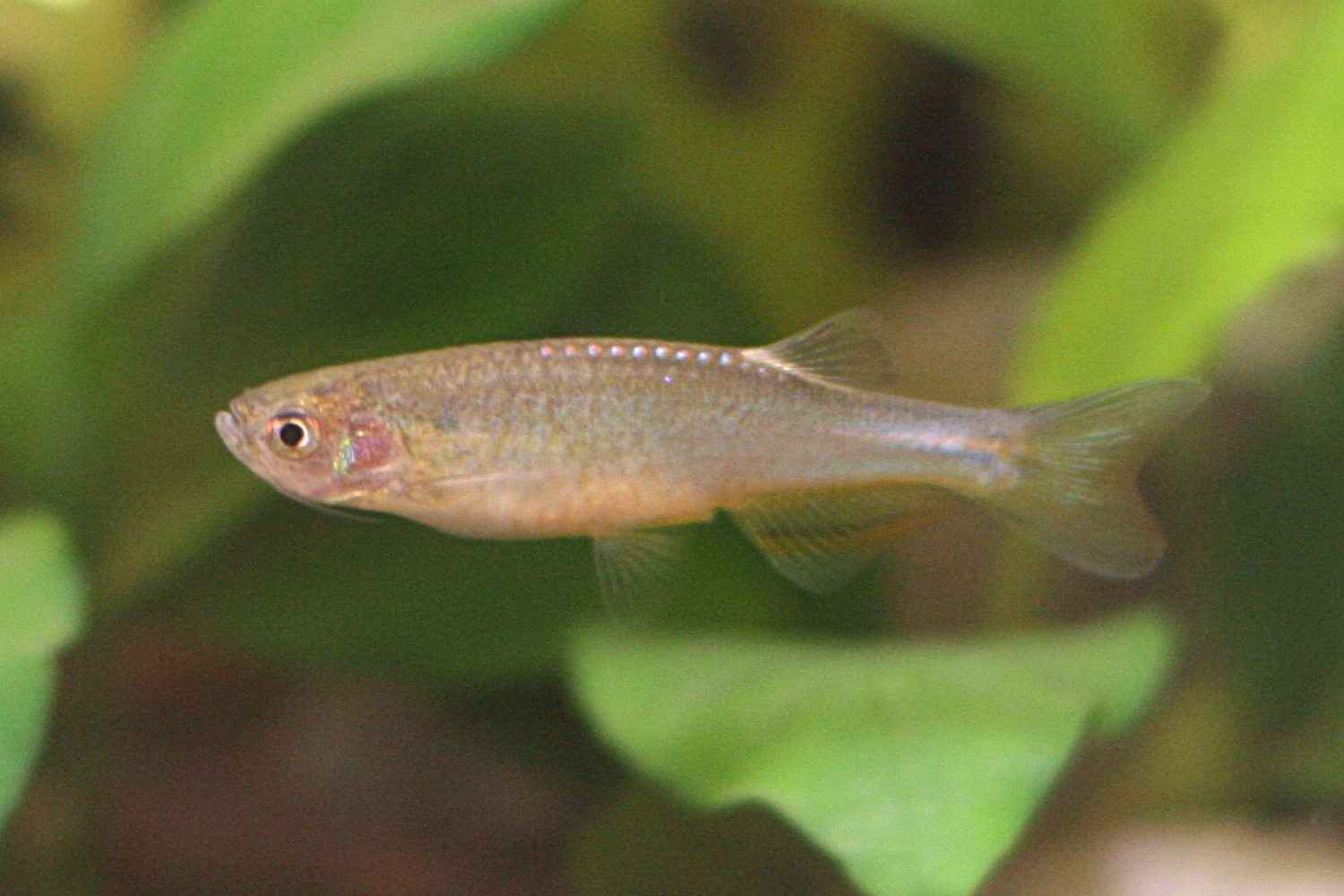

Conservation status
- Least Concern (IUCN 3.1)

Scientific classification
- Kingdom: Animalia
- Phylum: Chordata
- Class: Actinopterygii
- Order: Cypriniformes
- Family: Danionidae
- Subfamily: Danioninae
- Genus: Danio
- Species: D. roseus

Binomial name
- Danio roseus F. Fang & Kottelat, 2000

= Rose danio =

Species of fish

The rose danio (Danio roseus) is a tropical fish of the family Danionidae. At first glance, this species resembles the pearl danio, but lacks the orange stripe on the side. It has a rosy colouration along the lower part of the fish and lower fins and gleams purple-blue in sunlight. It is also commonly known as the purple passion danio. Its natural range includes the Mekong River drainage in China, Thailand. Laos, and Myanmar.

- Maximum length: 1.25 inches 3.175 cm
- Colors: Blue, purple, silver, red
- Temperature preference 20-25 °C
- pH preference: 6 to 7
- Hardness preference: Soft to medium
- Salinity preference: Low to medium
- Compatibility: Peaceful but fast, like most danios; needs plenty of space to swim; a good "dither" fish (draws timid fish out of hiding)
- Lifespan: Typically two to three years
- Ease of keeping: Moderate
- Ease of breeding: Moderate to easy
