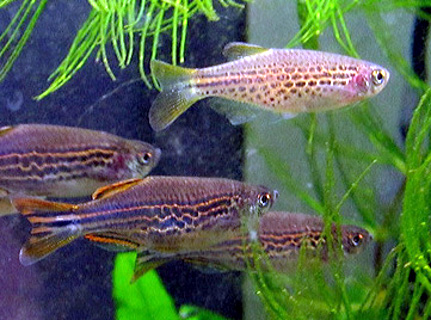
- Danio kyathit (above) and Danio quagga (below)

Scientific classification
- Kingdom: Animalia
- Phylum: Chordata
- Class: Actinopterygii
- Order: Cypriniformes
- Family: Danionidae
- Subfamily: Danioninae
- Genus: Danio
- Species: D. quagga

Binomial name
- Danio quagga Kullander, Liao, & Fang, 2009

= Danio quagga =

Species of fish

Danio quagga, also known as Orange finned danio, is a species of Danio found in the Chindwin River drainage in western Myanmar, there is another similar zebra danio species with blood red fins, Redfin danio (Danio sp. red fin).

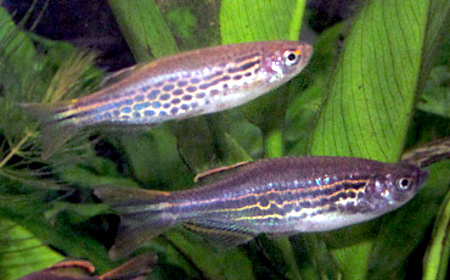
Danio kyathit and Danio quagga
