= Tanichthys micagemmae =

Conservation status
- Data Deficient (IUCN 3.1)

Scientific classification
- Kingdom: Animalia
- Phylum: Chordata
- Class: Actinopterygii
- Order: Cypriniformes
- Family: Tanichthyidae
- Genus: Tanichthys
- Species: T. micagemmae

Binomial name
- Tanichthys micagemmae Freyhof & Herder, 2001

Species of fish

Tanichthys micagemmae, commonly known as the Vietnamese cardinal minnow (especially in England, in the aquarium trade), is a species of freshwater ray-finned fish in the cypriniform family Tanichthyidae. It was discovered and described in 2001, in a tributary of the Bến Hải River in Quảng Bình Province, Vietnam. Its range includes what was the demilitarized zone between North and South Vietnam, which was subject to intense bombing during the Vietnam War.

== Appearance ==
The Vietnamese cardinal minnow is similar in appearance to the white cloud mountain minnow (T. albonubes), the most familiar member of its genus, which also can be found in the aquarium trade. It is distinguished from the latter primarily by the lighter coloration of its lower body and by the centered position of its lateral stripes, compared with a position well above the middle in the latter.

== In the aquarium ==
The Vietnamese cardinal minnow does best in tanks with a temperature of 19–23 °C (66–73 °F) and with softer water (with a calcium carbonate concentration of 37–142 ppm). This species is a schooling fish and so should be housed in groups of 8-10. It is peaceful (though males constantly challenge one another) and does well with a variety of taankmates, such as cyprinids, catfish, loaches, and tetras.

Like its more familiar congener, the Vietnamese cardinal minnow spawns in pairs along plants; in a well-planted aquarium, adults do not seek out their eggs, nor do they harm juveniles. Consequently, a founder population of males and females will, under suitable aquarium conditions, maintain itself indefinitely.
