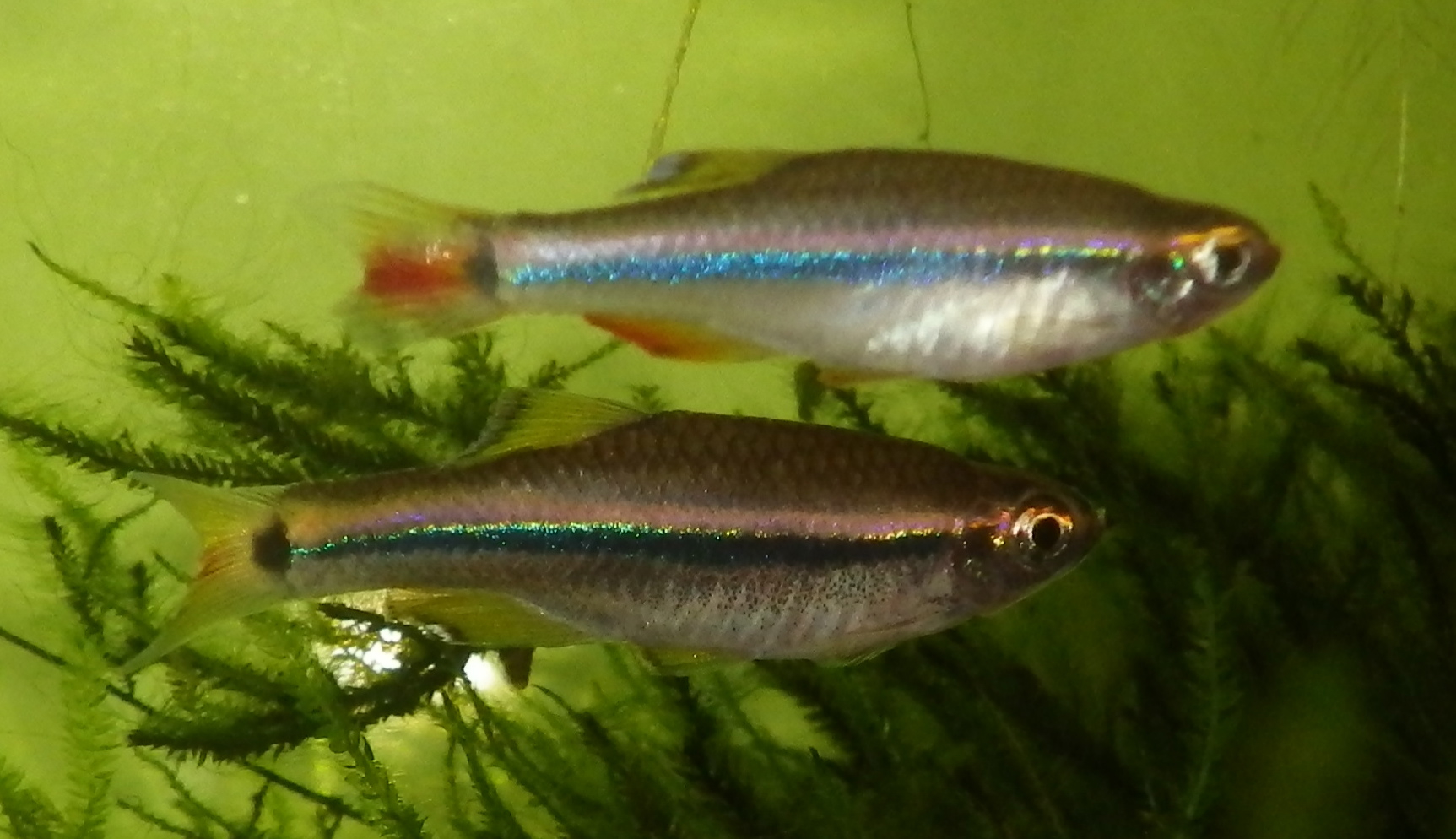

Scientific classification
- Domain: Eukaryota
- Kingdom: Animalia
- Phylum: Chordata
- Class: Actinopterygii
- Order: Cypriniformes
- Family: Tanichthyidae
- Genus: Tanichthys
- Species: T. kuehnei

Binomial name
- Tanichthys kuehnei Bohlen, Dvorák, Thang & Šlechtová, 2018

= Tanichthys kuehnei =

Species of fish

Tanichthys kuehnei is a species of freshwater ray-finned fish belonging to the mountain minnow family, Tanichthyidae. It is native to Central Vietnam.

== Etymology ==
The specific name honours the German aquarist Jens Kühne who tried to locate this species in the field.
