= Danio concatenatus =

Scientific classification
- Kingdom: Animalia
- Phylum: Chordata
- Class: Actinopterygii
- Order: Cypriniformes
- Family: Danionidae
- Subfamily: Danioninae
- Genus: Danio
- Species: D. concatenatus

Binomial name
- Danio concatenatus S. O. Kullander, 2015

Species of fish

Danio concatenatus is a species of Danio found on the western slope drainages of the Rakhine Yoma in Myanmar.
