= Danio sysphigmatus =

Scientific classification
- Kingdom: Animalia
- Phylum: Chordata
- Class: Actinopterygii
- Order: Cypriniformes
- Family: Danionidae
- Subfamily: Danioninae
- Genus: Danio
- Species: D. sysphigmatus

Binomial name
- Danio sysphigmatus S. O. Kullander, 2015

Species of fish

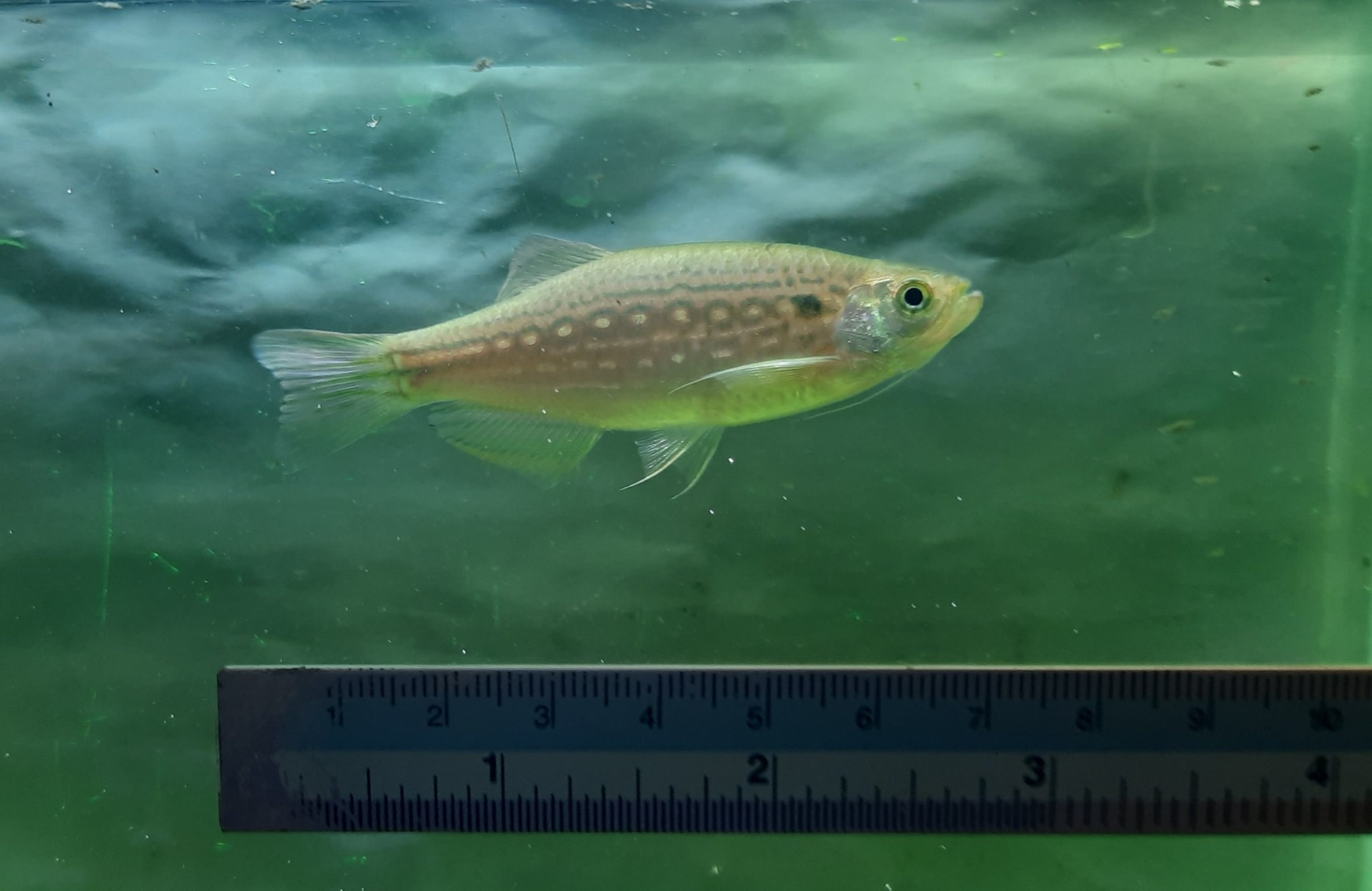
Danio sysphigmatus

Danio sysphigmatus is a species of Danio found Sittaung drainage and coastal rivers along the Tanintharyi coast in Myanmar.
