= Danio assamila =

Scientific classification
- Kingdom: Animalia
- Phylum: Chordata
- Class: Actinopterygii
- Order: Cypriniformes
- Family: Danionidae
- Subfamily: Danioninae
- Genus: Danio
- Species: D. assamila

Binomial name
- Danio assamila S. O. Kullander, 2015

Species of fish

Danio assamila is a species of Danio found in the Brahmaputra River drainage in India.
