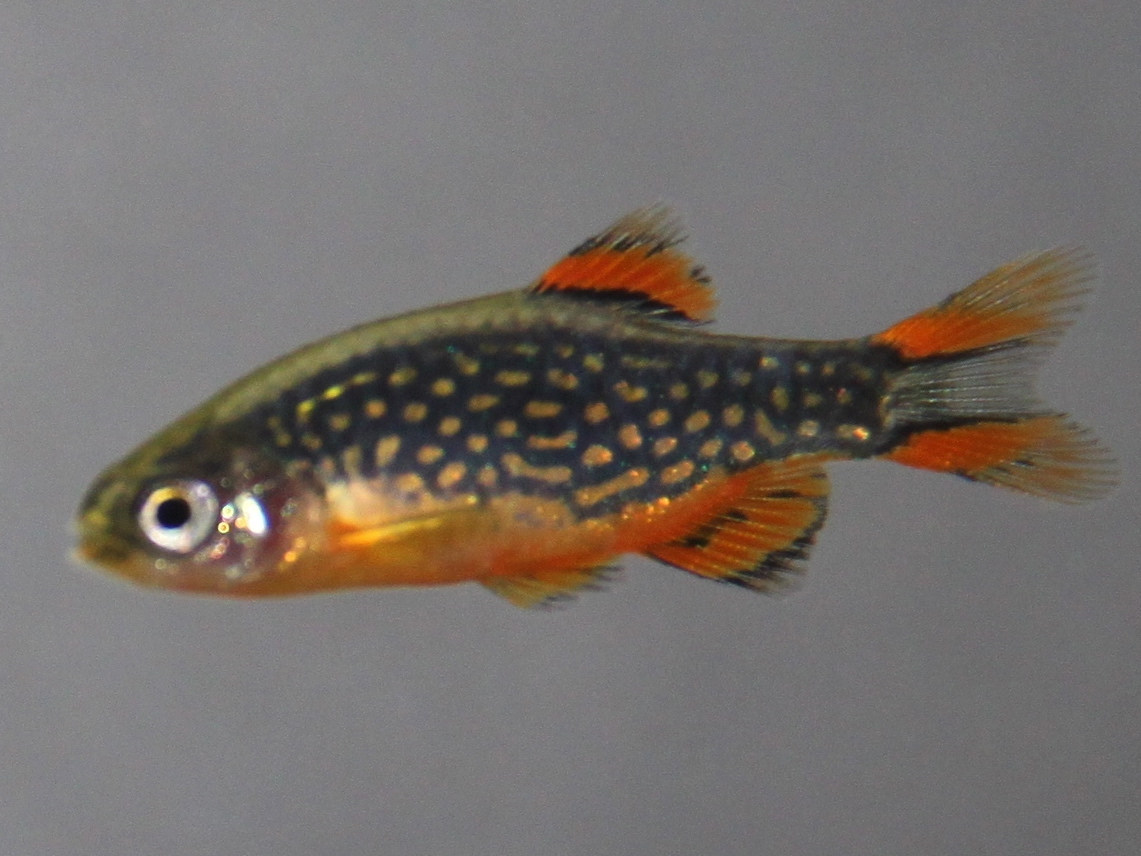
- Adult male

Conservation status
- Data Deficient (IUCN 3.1)

Scientific classification
- Kingdom: Animalia
- Phylum: Chordata
- Class: Actinopterygii
- Division: Teleostei
- Order: Cypriniformes
- Family: Danionidae
- Subfamily: Danioninae
- Genus: Danio
- Species: D. margaritatus

Binomial name
- Danio margaritatus (Roberts, 2007)

Synonyms
- Celestichthys margaritatus Roberts, 2007

= Danio margaritatus =

Celestial pearl danio

Species of fish

Danio margaritatus, the celestial pearl danio, often referred to in the aquarium trade as galaxy rasbora or Microrasbora sp. 'Galaxy', is a small freshwater ray-finned fish belonging to the family Danionidae. This fish is from Myanmar and Northern Thailand (in Salween basin). It has so far been found only in a very small area near Hopong east of Inle Lake, at an elevation of over 1,000 m (3,400 ft). Its habitat is part of the Salween basin, namely the Nam Lang and Nam Pawn Rivers. Discovered in 2006, the species quickly appeared in the aquarium trade, where its small size and bright colours made it an instant hit.

== Taxonomy ==
Initially, the celestial pearl danio was assumed to be a member of the genus Microrasbora, due to its similarity to "Microrasbora" erythromicron. Less than a year after the discovery of the celestial pearl danio, it was scientifically described and given the genus name Celestichthys. In 2008, a more comprehensive study showed the celestial pearl danio was a member of the genus Danio, with Danio erythromicron and Danio choprae as its closest relatives.

== Description ==
This is a small, plump danionin with a markedly blunt snout, measuring 2–2.5 cm standard length, a few individuals are able to reach 3 cm. The body is about three times as long as it is high. In general shape, it resembles Danio erythromicron more than any other known species.

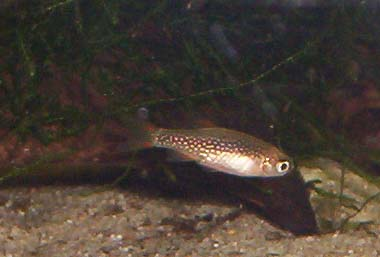
Adult female

This species shows some sexual dimorphism: males have a bright-blue background color (dull blue-green in females), and their fins are more brightly colored. The tail end of their bodies (the caudal peduncle) is also higher than in females. The body is sprinkled with small, pearly dots. The back is bronzy green, and the belly in females is yellowish-white. The gill covers are transparent, letting the blood-red gills shine through.

The males will prominently display their unpaired fins to conspecifics. All fins, save the pectoral fins, show two parallel black lines with a bright red area in between; on the tail fin, this pattern is present twice (once on each lobe) and the outer black band is vestigial. Females have a weaker version of the pattern in the tail and dorsal fins only, sometimes in the anal fin, too.

A courting male develops a red belly and the flanks brighten and darken, making the pearly spots stand out even more, with the back appearing paler than the flanks and also standing out. A female in reproductive age can be recognized by a black anal spot which separates the belly color from the uniformly reddish base of the anal fin. The male has a small black pad at the edges of the lower jaw, which is absent or reduced in females. Immature fish show some indication of a striped pattern, which eventually decomposes into the pearly dots.

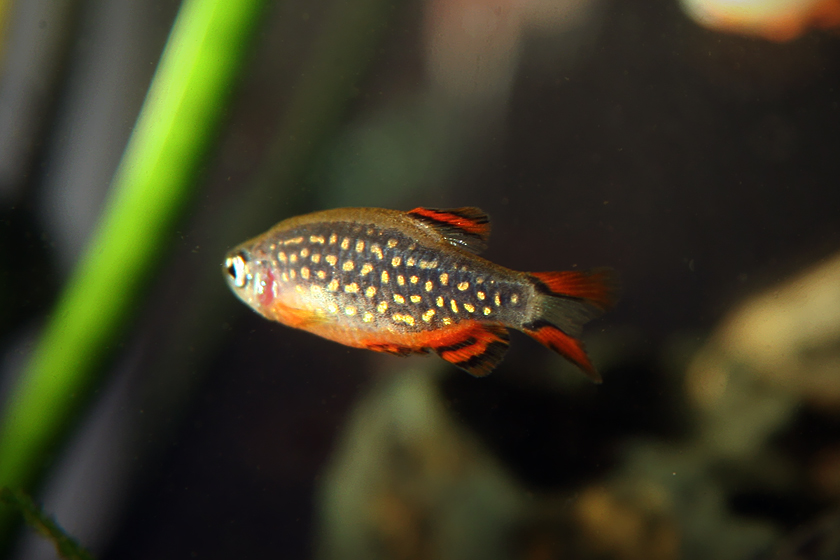
Male

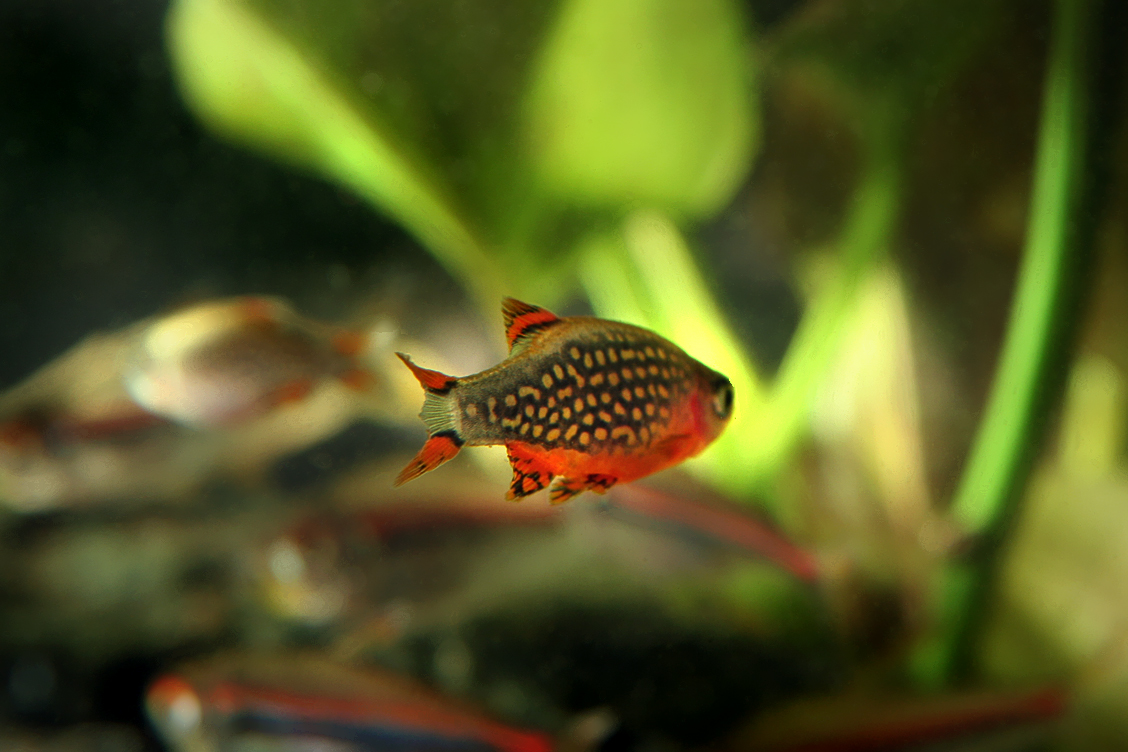
Male

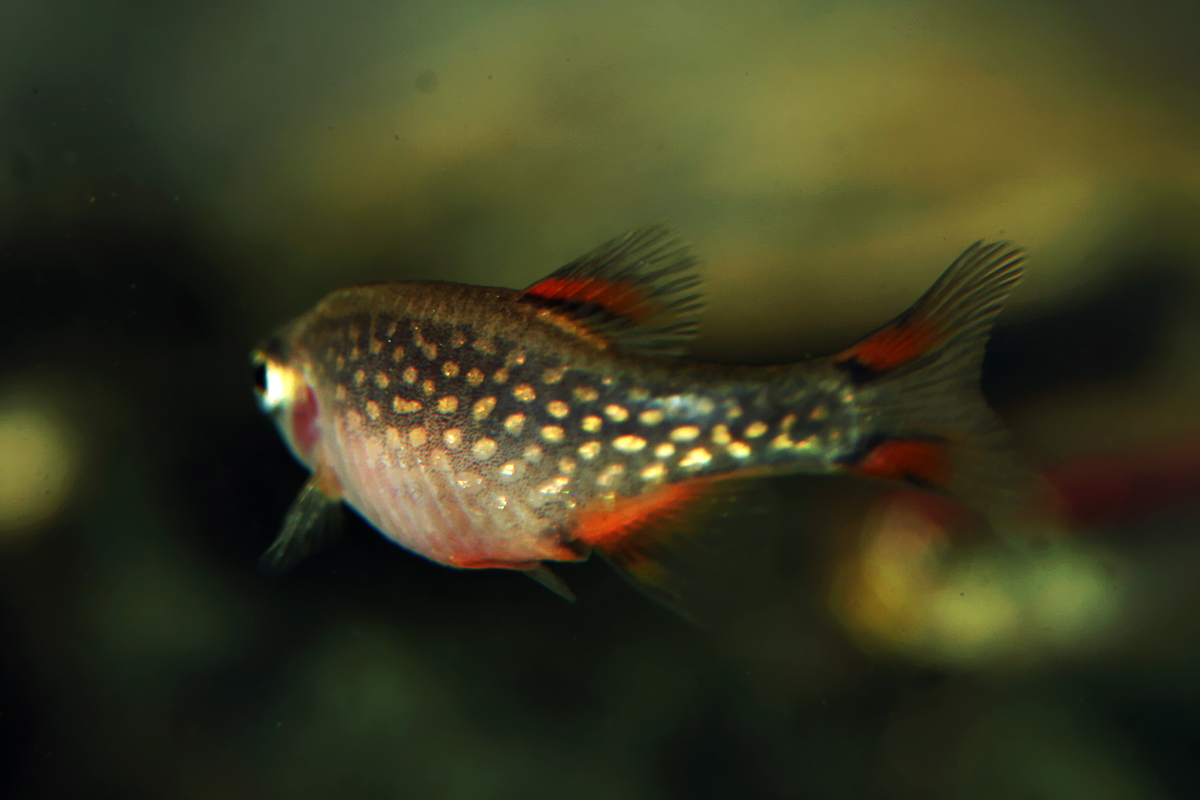
Female

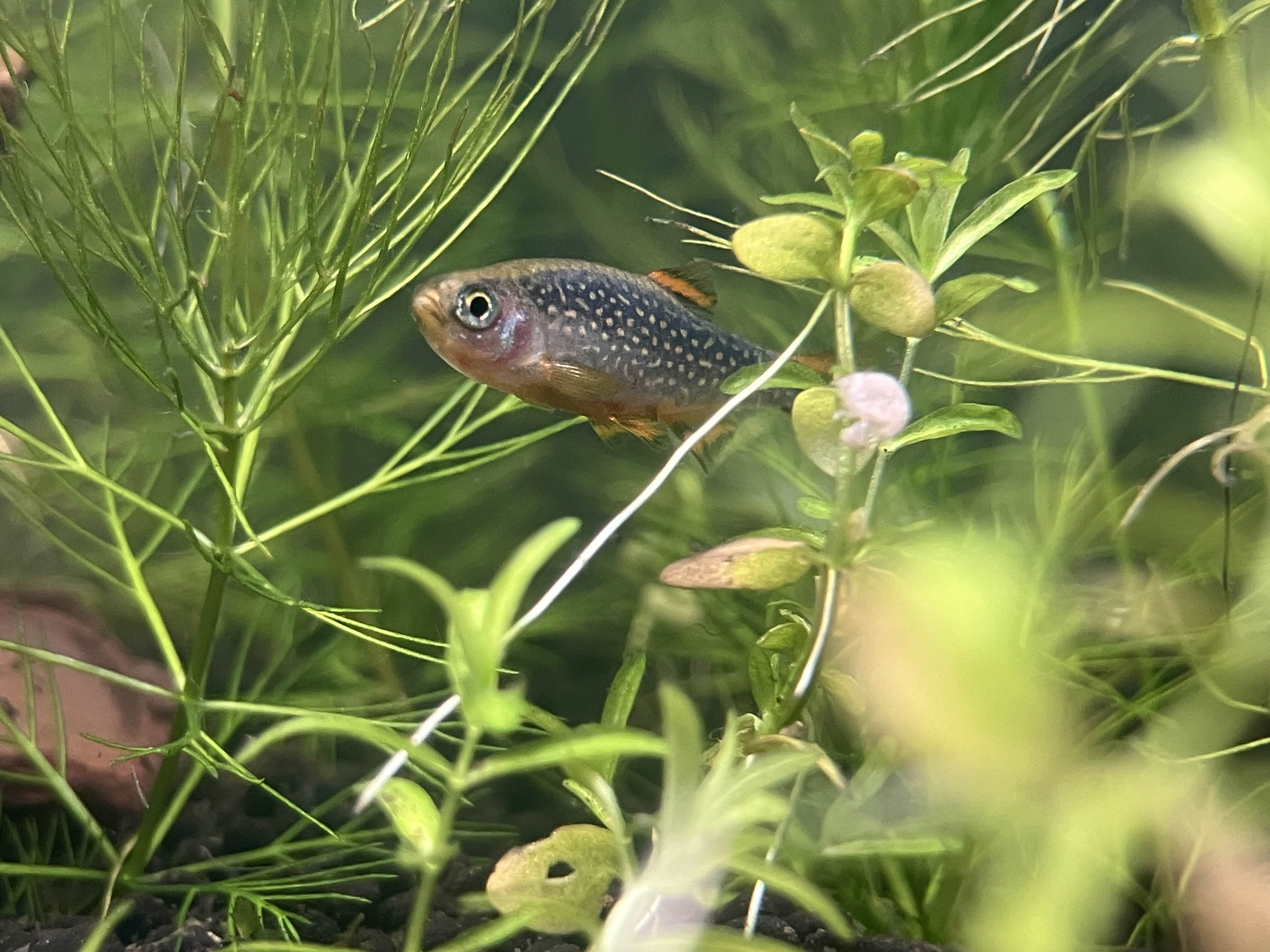
Male

== Ecology ==
The fish lives in small ponds created by seeping groundwater or overflow from small brooks or springs. Water temperature in January is rather low (22–24 °C), but as the habitat is very shallow, it heats up quickly during hot spells, thus D. margaritatus is probably tolerant of temperatures above 26 °C. As in most water bodies in the Inle drainage, the water is slightly alkaline. The habitat is heavily vegetated with Hydrocharitaceae similar to Elodea (water weed).

The celestial pearl danio shares its habitat with a very few fish species: a Microrasbora similar to M. rubescens, a rosy loach (Yunnanilus, possibly a new species, and the dwarf snakehead Channa harcourtbutleri. The latter species presumably is the only known significant predator of D. margaritatus.

The species is locally fished for food to some extent; it is dried and bought as a protein source by poor people. A can of some 500 D. margaritatus sold for food fetched about 25 kyat (about 2 UK pounds/3.9 US$/2.7 EUR) before the fish was discovered for the aquarium trade.

=== Reproduction ===
The spawning behavior has significant consequences for captive breeding (see below). The celestial pearl danio appears to be adapted to somewhat ephemeral habitats. It does not have a dedicated spawning season, nor do the females lay continuously. Rather, they produce small batches of around 30 eggs per spawning episode. The time between spawnings is unknown at present. Eggs are not strewn freely into the water, but they are not deposited in clutches to a prepared surface either; rather, it seems, that they are hidden away in vegetation as a loose batch. Courting males will seek out and try to defend a patch of dense vegetation. While pursuit swimming has been observed, it does not seem to be connected directly to the actual act of reproduction in which the male displays to a passing female, and tests her readiness with a brief chase. The pair then moves into the substrate and deposits the eggs. Other males noticing reproduction will try to follow the mating pair, either to try to fertilize the eggs with their own sperm or eat them.

At 24–25 °C, the larvae hatch after 3–4 days. They are dark and cryptic initially and for about three days after hatching, they hide away between substrate and detritus and are very hard to see. They subsequently become lighter in color and start swimming freely and feeding on their own. At some 8–10 weeks after hatching, they undergo metamorphosis to adult form, and the color pattern starts to appear from week 12 onwards.

== Status and conservation ==
Within six months of its appearance in the aquarium trade, the species was falsely reported as having become so rare, collectors were obtaining only a "few dozen fish per day". Initially, only a small number of aquarists managed to breed the fish successfully, while nearly all the fish offered for sale were wild-caught. The (unfounded) concern over the wild populations led British fishkeeping magazine Practical Fishkeeping to request that only aquarists prepared to breed the fish should buy any fish they see for sale, to reduce pressure on the wild stocks by diminishing the demand for them in the UK. As the species seems adapted to living in and colonizing small, possibly ephemeral pools, it seemed not very well able to withstand prolonged and intense exploitation—if the stock in all pools at one location is entirely fished off, it is unclear in how far the fish would be able to recolonize them. Conversely, if only part of a local subpopulation is removed, pools from which all celestial pearl danios have been removed likely will be recolonized with a healthy population again after one year or so.

The dire warnings reported by Clarke, later in 2007 were found to be unfounded. The celestial pearl danio is prolific, spawning "almost every day", causing ponds that were thought to be empty to be fully restocked a few months later as fry hatched, grew, and reproduced quickly.

The government of Myanmar banned exports of the fish in February 2007. However, an inquest into the species by Myanmar officials discovered populations of the fish in at least "five locations around Hopong". Currently, the fish is captive-bred worldwide commercially and by hobbyists, pushing the price down from its initial high of $20 or more per fish to around $4 each.

== In the aquarium ==
The celestial pearl danio is a rather undemanding fish if its basic requirements are being met. It does not require much space, as it is not a very active swimmer, and is not a true shoaling fish, meaning it does not require large numbers of conspecifics for its well-being. In a small tank, a group of six individuals—half males, half females—will do well and exhibit natural behavior. They tend to be rather stationary, hovering in a peculiar position in favorite spots; males and females tend to keep separate when at rest. Altogether, their behavior again resembles Danio erythromicron more than other fish.

Tanks for the celestial pearl danio should be well-planted and direct daylight may be favorable (the natural habitat is so shallow as to be well lit throughout). Water weed and similar plants should be abundant, and stones and wood to create hiding spots should be provided. It is advisable to supply the fish with a spawning mop or a dense growth of suitable plants (java moss has been successfully used). A dense tangle of natural plants for spawning has the additional advantage of harboring protists on which the fry feed initially. The celestial pearl danio seems overall quite peaceful, though some fin-nipping occurs. Consequently, it cannot be kept with large or "bully" fish. Small, swarming danionins which require similar water conditions would be a natural choice for company, as such more active species provide nice contrast behaviorally and, being available in a wide range of colors and patterns, also make it possible to choose fish that complement the brilliant colors of D. margaritatus. Many danionins prefer slightly acidic water, however, and maintaining the rather high pH found across the Inle basin seems a necessary condition to keep fish from there successfully.
