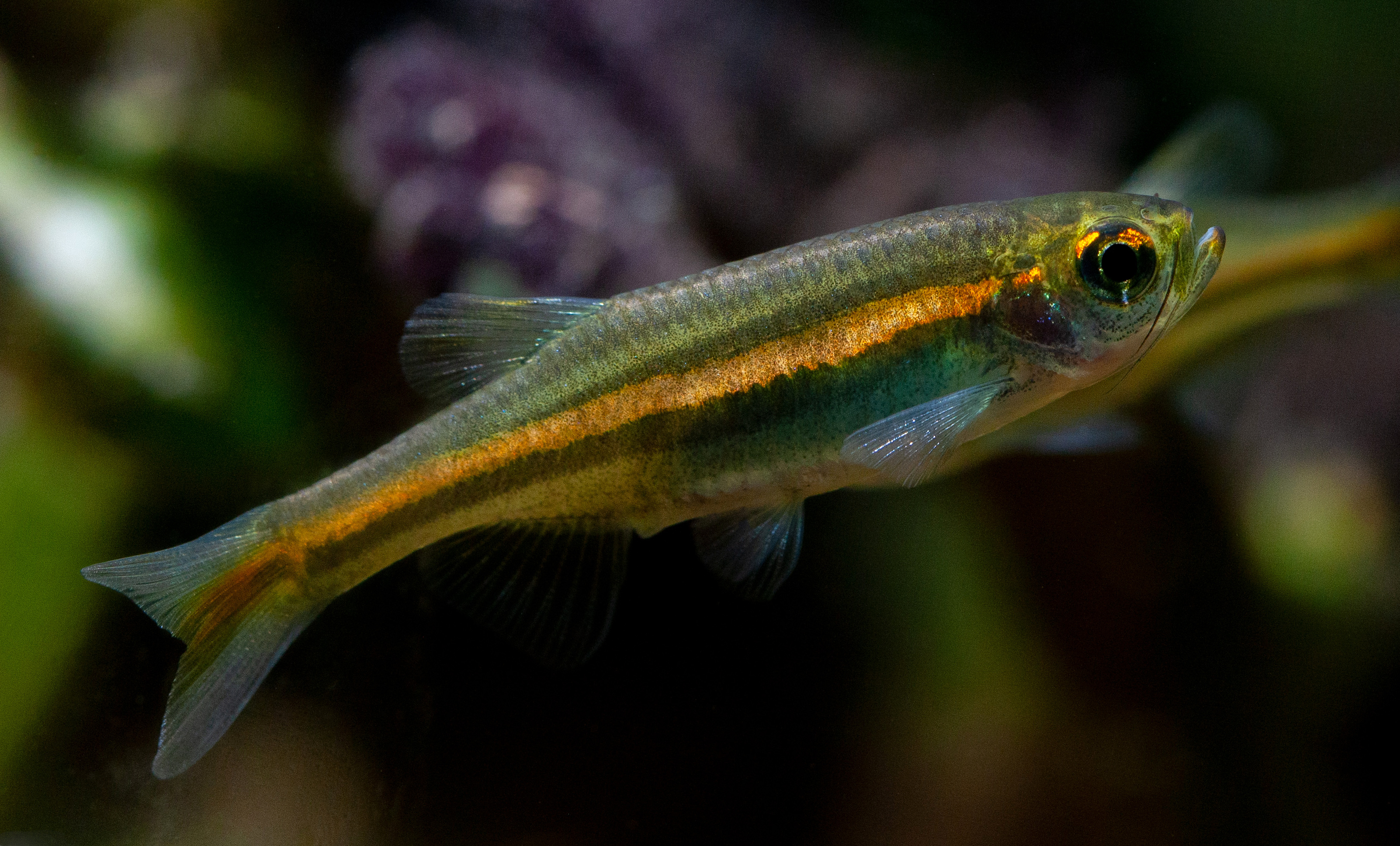

Conservation status
- Vulnerable (IUCN 3.1)

Scientific classification
- Domain: Eukaryota
- Kingdom: Animalia
- Phylum: Chordata
- Class: Actinopterygii
- Order: Cypriniformes
- Family: Danionidae
- Subfamily: Danioninae
- Genus: Danio
- Species: D. jaintianensis

Binomial name
- Danio jaintianensis N. Sen, 2007

= Danio jaintianensis =

Species of fish

Danio jaintianensis is a species of Danio endemic to India.
