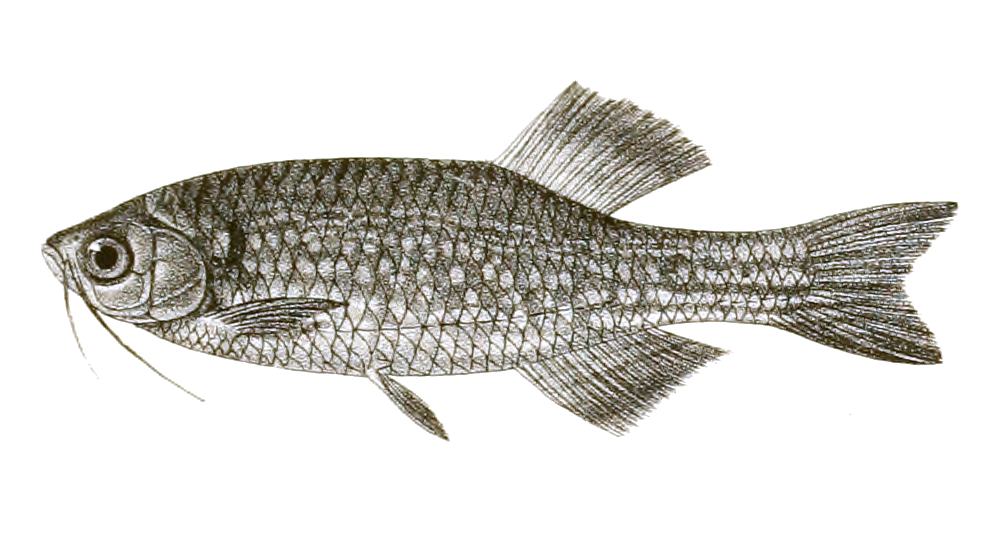
- Illustration from "The Fishes of India", vol. II, by Francis Day (1878)

Conservation status
- Least Concern (IUCN 3.1)

Scientific classification
- Kingdom: Animalia
- Phylum: Chordata
- Class: Actinopterygii
- Order: Cypriniformes
- Family: Danionidae
- Subfamily: Danioninae
- Genus: Danio
- Species: D. dangila

Binomial name
- Danio dangila (F. Hamilton, 1822)

Synonyms
- Cyprinus dangila Hamilton, 1822; Perilampus reticulatus McClelland, 1839

= Danio dangila =

Species of fish

Danio dangila, the moustached danio, is a freshwater fish, and is the largest of the true Danio species at up to 15 cm (5.9 in) long. Its name is from its particularly long barbels. It is sometimes kept in aquariums, where its relatively passive nature allows it to be housed in a community tank.

== Details ==
Adults individuals can grow up to 15 cm (6 inches) and have a lifespan of 3 to 5 years.

== Habitat ==
This fish inhabits the Ganga-Brahmaputra drainage system in Bihar, northern Bengal, northeast India and Nepal, as well as being recorded in Umroi Stream and rheophilic torrent in India. Its habitat is clear mountain streams, where specimens have been taken from the rocks and stones which compose the riverbed. the moustached danio prefers soft water with a relatively neutral pH.

== Threats ==
Though this fish is small and so rarely eaten, there have been concerns on its harvesting for the pet trade. Captive breeding has been attempted, succeeding in ICAR; this method has apparently also been replicated by fish farmers. The IUCN has considered the harvesting to be a potential cause of decline, which may be supported by population surveys, but more surveys must be conducted in order to confirm the effects. If captive breeding cannot fuel the stock needed for the aquarium trade, then it may have to be reassessed, potentially moving it to a higher threat category.
