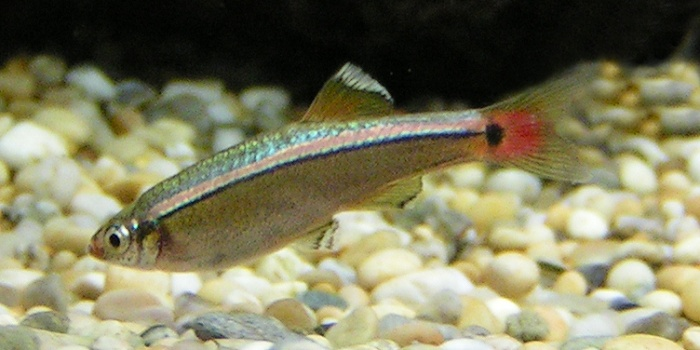

Conservation status
- Data Deficient (IUCN 3.1)

Scientific classification
- Kingdom: Animalia
- Phylum: Chordata
- Class: Actinopterygii
- Order: Cypriniformes
- Family: Tanichthyidae
- Genus: Tanichthys
- Species: T. albonubes

Binomial name
- Tanichthys albonubes S. Y. Lin, 1932

= White Cloud Mountain minnow =

Species of freshwater fish

The White Cloud Mountain minnow (Tanichthys albonubes) is a hardy species of freshwater fish and coldwater fish often kept in an aquarium. The species was considered to be a member of the carp family (family Cyprinidae) of the order Cypriniformes, although now it is placed in the family Tanichthyidae. This species is native to China. The White Cloud Mountain minnow is practically extinct in its native habitat, due to pollution and tourism. It was believed to be extinct for over 20 years in 1980, but an apparently native population of this fish was discovered on Hainan Island, well away from the White Cloud Mountain. They are bred in farms and are easily available through the aquarium trade. However, inbreeding in farms has led to genetically weak stock that is vulnerable to disease and prone to physical deformities.

The species was discovered at White Cloud Mountain in the city of Guǎngzhōu in the province of Guǎngdōng around the 1930s by a Boy Scout leader called Tan Kam Fe, hence the generic name Tanichthys ("Tan's fish"). The specific name albonubes is from the Latin alba nubes (white cloud).

The fish are sold in the aquarium trade under a variety of names, including White Cloud, White Cloud Mountain fish, White Cloud minnow, etc. The names Canton or China danio (although it is not a member of the genus Danio or a danionin) and cardinal fish are also encountered. In Chinese the fish is known as 唐魚 (táng yu), 廣東細鯽 (Guǎngdōng xìjì), or 潘氏細鯽 (pānshì xìjì). Aphyocypris pooni is an obsolete synonym for this species; it was coined to designate a color variety which is now known to be the same species as the White Cloud Mountain minnow.

== Description ==
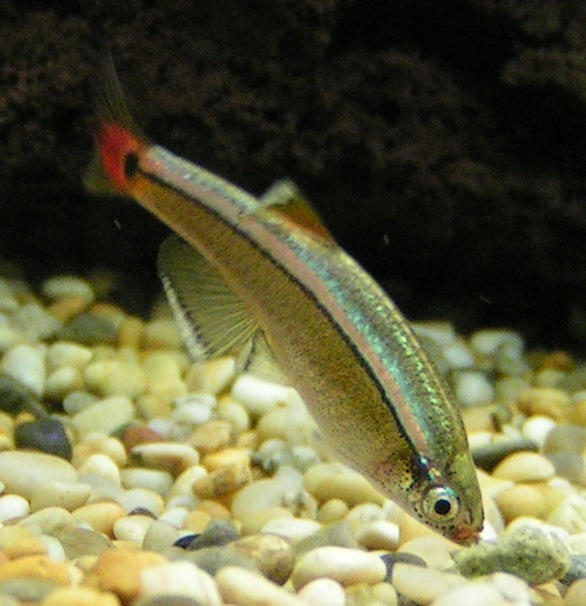
T. albonubes

This species grows to approximately 4 cm (1.6 in)) in overall length, and is silver-green in color with a bright red caudal and dorsal fin. Several varieties have been developed through the fish's domestication, one with bright light edges to the dorsal and anal fins and one with red edges to those fins. The species can also be found in a golden cultivar and a rosy pink variety that displays red on all of the fins, and all color morphs can have long finnage. Sexual dimorphism is slight but noticeable. The male generally has brighter colors and a slimmer body, and the male's dorsal and anal fins are wide and fan-shaped, whereas those of the female are triangular and wedge-shaped. Females also present a whiter, distended abdomen.

== Diet and feeding ==
The White Cloud Mountain minnow is an opportunistic omnivore. It will commonly feed on a variety of aquatic plants and insect larvae. They particularly relish mosquito and shrimp. In times of extreme ecological pressure, such as drought or sunlight infiltration, the minnow often overlooks the simple vegetation for more nutritious food sources including fruits, nuts, and in extreme cases mountain minnows have been observed scavenging off carcasses of fellow pond dwelling organisms.

== In captivity ==
=== In the aquarium ===
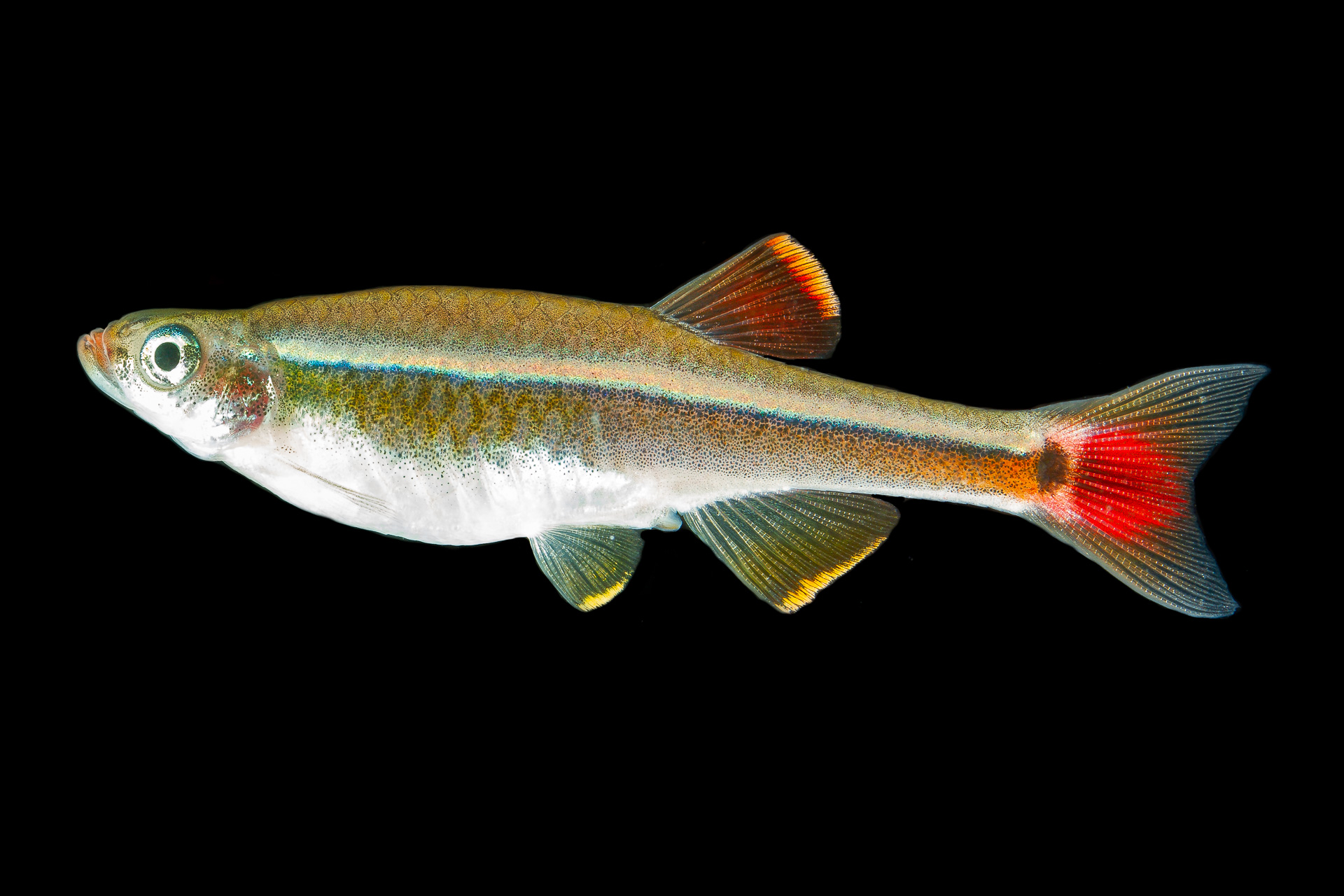
T. albonubes in aquarium

White Cloud Mountain minnows are considered a good fish for beginners, as they are extremely forgiving with regard to aquarium temperature and water quality. Standard flake or pellet food is accepted readily. They are often sold as ideal "starter fish" for cycling a new aquarium, however, this process can be stressful or even fatal, and it is advisable to introduce the fish to an already cycled tank. They are shoaling fish, and feel most comfortable in a group of at least five. An individual of these minnows kept alone may become timid and lose its bright color. White Clouds are generally peaceful and happy to coexist with other fish, as long as they are not put in a tank with larger fish that may eat them. The minnows are usually top or middle-level swimmers and rarely swim close to the bottom of a tank. A typical lifespan can last for five years or longer.

Although the nominal temperature range for the species in the wild is 18–22 °C (64–72 °F), it can survive water temperatures down to 5 °C (41 °F). This makes it an ideal fish for keeping in an unheated aquarium in cold climates. In fact, White Clouds are more active and healthier when kept at temperatures lower than those at which most tropical tanks are kept. Water hardness (dH) should be from 5 to 19, and pH levels should range between 6.0 and 8.0. Also, the aquarium should have a top. White Clouds have been known to jump out on rare occasions.

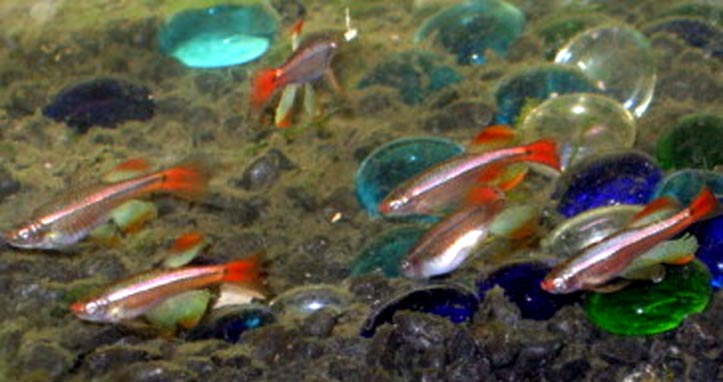
"Meteor Minnow" variety

During the 1940s and 1950s, White Cloud Mountain minnows acquired the nickname, the "Poor Man's Neon Tetra", because they were much more affordable in price than the colorful and then expensive neon tetras.

Two variants are commonly available: the "Golden Cloud" and the longer-finned "Meteor Minnow", which can be gold as well. The Golden Cloud is a relatively new variety as compared to the Meteor Minnow. The Meteor Minnow first made its appearance in the 1950s in Perth, Western Australia, and the Golden Cloud in the 1990s. Inbreeding of Golden Clouds have resulted in "Blonde" Clouds, light yellow specimens similar in colour to blonde guppies and "Pink Clouds", pinkish-beige coloured flesh specimens which lacks further pigmentation still, except for the red on the fins.

=== In the pond ===
Although it is a small fish, the White Cloud Mountain minnow is sometimes used as a pond fish, especially in ponds intended for frogs to breed. Adult White Cloud Mountain minnows will sometimes eat frog eggs as the tadpoles begin to move about or wait for them to hatch. Once tadpoles are a couple of days old they are out of danger. White Cloud Mountain minnows will effectively control the breeding of mosquitoes. They will breed readily in ponds as long as there are no other fish. While they can endure temperatures as low as 5 °C (41 °F), they should have good heating systems in the pond to prevent the water from freezing over in climates where this occurs regularly, making them more ideal for Subtropical climates (similar to their native habitat).

=== Breeding ===
Male White Cloud Mountain minnows sparring in an aquarium

White Clouds are easy to breed and are recommended for novice breeders. They may be conditioned for breeding with live foods such as brine shrimp and daphnia. The minnows should be placed in a small tank with a spawning mop or some java moss. Males will attempt to attract females by displaying their fins, often alongside one another. White Clouds are egg-scatterers, dropping their eggs freely amongst the vegetation. Because they do not generally cannibalize their offspring, the parents can be left in the tank.

White cloud eggs hatch within 48 to 60 hours. The tiny fry may be visible on the sides of the glass or among plants. After they are free swimming, they can be fed a finely powdered fish food or infusoria.

Spawning activity could include: flaring of the fins on males, a gravid spot on females, or males relentlessly chasing females.

== See also ==
- List of freshwater aquarium fish species
- Rasboras
- List of coldwater fish species
- List of endangered and protected species of China
