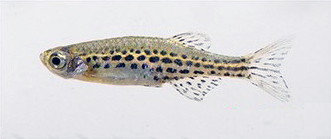

Scientific classification
- Kingdom: Animalia
- Phylum: Chordata
- Class: Actinopterygii
- Order: Cypriniformes
- Family: Danionidae
- Subfamily: Danioninae
- Genus: Danio
- Species: D. tinwini

Binomial name
- Danio tinwini S. O. Kullander & F. Fang, 2009

= Danio tinwini =

Species of fish

Danio tinwini, commonly called gold-ring danio, is a newly discovered species of Danio from Myanmar. It is also referred to as Danio sp. "TW02". It is a tiny gold fish whose body and fins are covered with blue spots. It has also been referred to as Danio sp "Ringlet" or Danio sp "Blue Ring". It has been described by Kullander and Fang, based on collection by Mr U Tin Win, hence its species name. It is known only from the Mogaung Chaung (Mogaung stream), Myitkyina District, Kachin State, northern Myanmar. This is a tributary of the Irrawaddy River.

It is similar to D. kyathit and D. nigrofasciatus, but can be differentiated by its smaller size, spotted (vs. striped) patterning in the unpaired fins, and much shorter barbels.

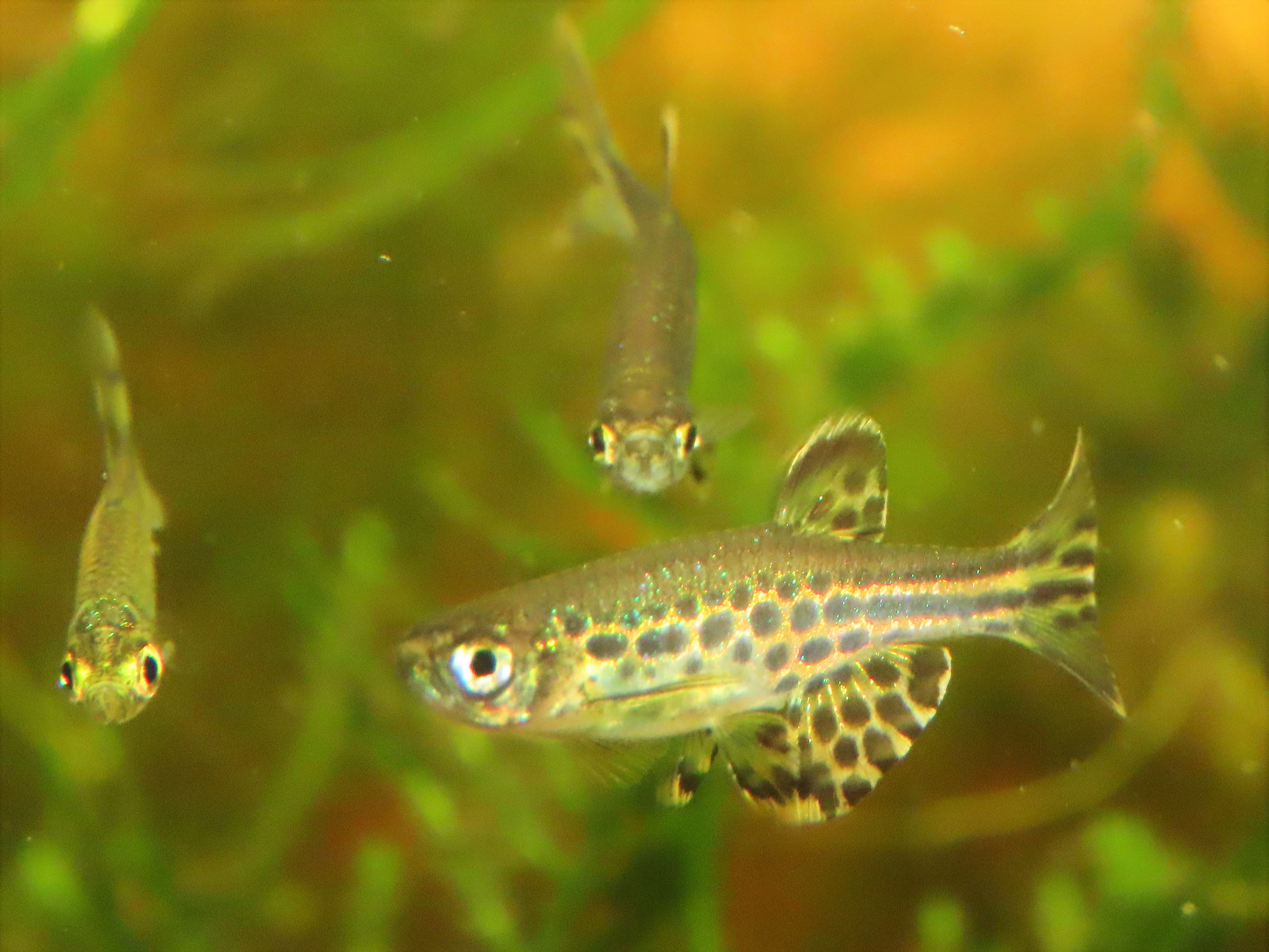
Males sparring

- Maximum length: .67 in /2.17 cm
- Colors: Blue, silver, gold, emerald sheen
- Temperature preference: 20–25 °C
- pH preference: 6.5 to 7.5
- Hardness preference: Soft to medium
- Salinity preference: Low to medium
- Compatibility: Good but fast like most danios
- Lifespan: Typically two to three years
- Ease of keeping: Moderate
- Ease of breeding: Moderate to hard
