= Black-barred danio =

Scientific classification
- Kingdom: Animalia
- Phylum: Chordata
- Class: Actinopterygii
- Order: Cypriniformes
- Family: Danionidae
- Subfamily: Danioninae
- Genus: Danio
- Species: D. absconditus

Binomial name
- Danio absconditus S. O. Kullander & Britz, 2015

Species of fish

The black-barred danio (Danio absconditus) is a species of Danio discovered in Myanmar by Tin Win in 2005 and described in 2015 by Sven Oscar Kullander and Ralf Britz.
