= Redfin danio =

Scientific classification
- Kingdom: Animalia
- Phylum: Chordata
- Class: Actinopterygii
- Order: Cypriniformes
- Family: Danionidae
- Subfamily: Danioninae
- Genus: Danio
- Species: Danio sp. red fin

Binomial name
- Danio sp. red fin

Ornamental fish

The redfin danio is a fish. The redfin danio resembles a zebra danio with blood-red fins. It may be a colour morph of the orange-finned zebra danio, Danio quagga.
