= Danio tweediei =

Scientific classification
- Kingdom: Animalia
- Phylum: Chordata
- Class: Actinopterygii
- Order: Cypriniformes
- Family: Danionidae
- Genus: Danio
- Species: D. tweediei

Binomial name
- Danio tweediei Brittan, 1956

Species of fish

Danio tweedei, the kedah danio, is a species of freshwater ray-finned fish belonging to the family Danionidae. This species is found in Peninsular Malaysia, Penang and possibly in southeastern Myanmar. It was previously conisdered to be a synonym of D. albolineata the pearl danio, but Eschmeyer's Catalog of Fishes recognises this as a valid species. This species was first formally described in 1956 by Martin Ralph Brittan from type specimens collected in a stream in Kedah by Major H.C. Neath of the Brigade of Ghurkas and is named in honour of Michael Tweedie, the director of the Raffles Museum in Singapore, in recognition of his "many contributions to the natural history of Malaya".
