= Meghalaya danio =

Scientific classification
- Domain: Eukaryota
- Kingdom: Animalia
- Phylum: Chordata
- Class: Actinopterygii
- Order: Cypriniformes
- Family: Danionidae
- Subfamily: Danioninae
- Genus: Danio
- Species: D. meghalayensis

Binomial name
- Danio meghalayensis (N. Sen & Dey, 1985)

Species of fish

The Meghalaya danio (Danio meghalayensis) is a recently discovered species of fish from the Meghalaya state, India. It lives in water at about 4,000 ft (1,200 m) above sea level. They can grow up to 10 centimetres (3.9 in).
