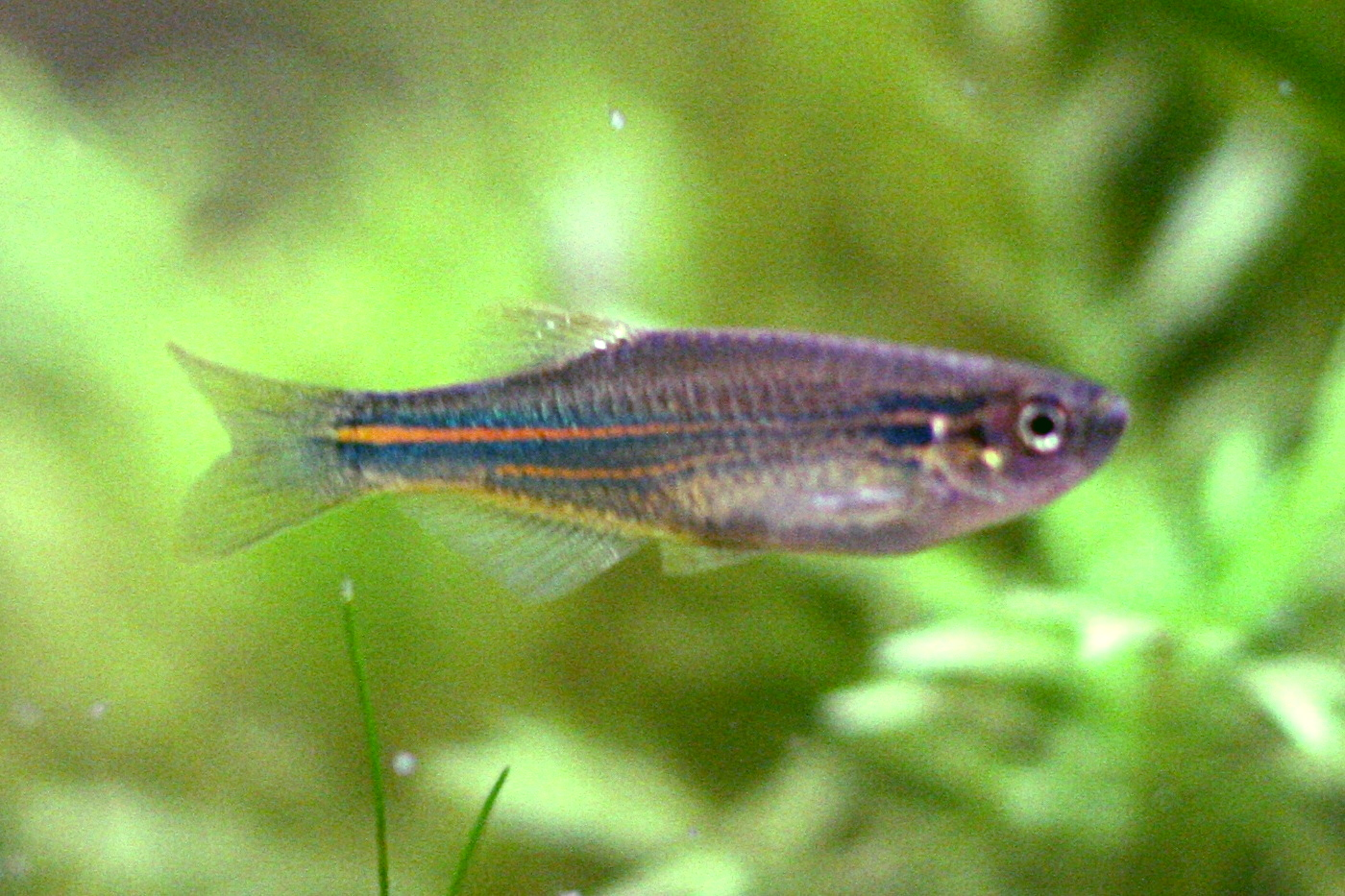

Conservation status
- Least Concern (IUCN 3.1)

Scientific classification
- Kingdom: Animalia
- Phylum: Chordata
- Class: Actinopterygii
- Order: Cypriniformes
- Family: Danionidae
- Subfamily: Danioninae
- Genus: Danio
- Species: D. kerri

Binomial name
- Danio kerri (H. M. Smith, 1931)

Synonyms
- Brachydanio kerri H. M. Smith, 1931

= Blue danio =

Species of fish

The blue danio, Kerr's danio or turquoise danio (Danio kerri), is a tropical fish belonging to the genus Danio in family Danionidae.

== Distribution and habitat ==
The blue danio is found on the islands of Langkawi and Ko Yao Yai in Malaysia.

== Description ==
It is a blue-colored, deep-bodied danio with several pinkish/gold lines from tail to gills which may or may not be continuous, over a powder blue side.

== In the aquarium ==
The blue danio is a peaceful, active schooling fish, so is usually kept in groups. They prefer a well-planted environment, but still need plenty of space to school. Blue danios are often kept in water with a 6.5 – 7.0 pH, a water hardness of 8 – 12 dGH, and a temperature range of 73–77 °F (23–25 °C).

== Mating ==
Blue danios are egg-scatterers that spawn over coarse gravel beds. They will typically spawn at the first light of day. The eggs will hatch in about 36 hours.

== Etymology ==
The taxonomic name honors A.F.G. Kerr, who collected the first specimen on Ko Yao Yai in 1929.
