= Danio pulcher =

Scientific classification
- Kingdom: Animalia
- Phylum: Chordata
- Class: Actinopterygii
- Order: Cypriniformes
- Family: Danionidae
- Genus: Danio
- Species: D. pulcher

Binomial name
- Danio pulcher H. M. Smith, 1931

Synonyms
- Brachydanio pulcher (H. M. Smith, 1931)

Species of fish

Danio pulcher, the blue-redstripe danio, is a species of freshwater ray-finned fish belonging to the family Danionidae. This species is found in Thailand. It was previously considered to be a synonym of D. albolineata the pearl danio but Eschmeyer's Catalog of Fishes recognises this as a valid species.

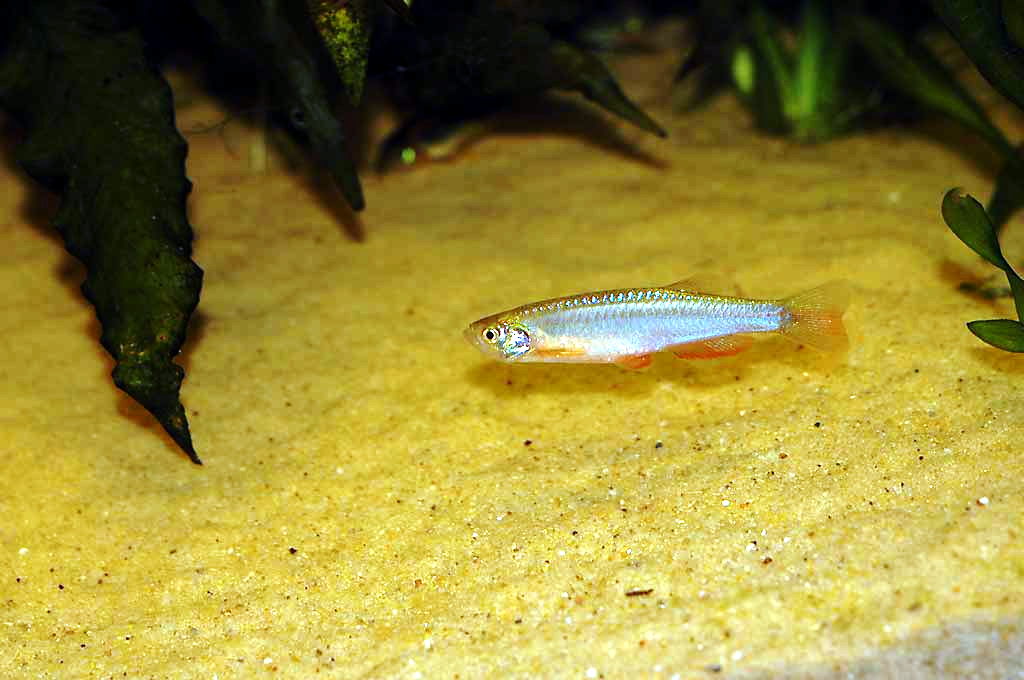
