= Blue moon danio =

Conservation status
- Near Threatened (IUCN 3.1)

Scientific classification
- Kingdom: Animalia
- Phylum: Chordata
- Class: Actinopterygii
- Order: Cypriniformes
- Family: Danionidae
- Subfamily: Danioninae
- Genus: Devario
- Species: D. xyrops

Binomial name
- Devario xyrops F. Fang & S. O. Kullander, 2009

Species of fish

The blue moon danio (Devario xyrops) is a species of freshwater ray-finned fish belonging to the family Danionidae. This species is endemic to Myanmar. First described in 2009, they are found in small forested streams on the western slope of the Arakan Mountains in Rakhine State of south-western Myanmar; these streams are typically reduced to a series of interconnected pools during the dry season. This species has also been imported to Europe as aquarium fishes with the code names "Broken Line".
