= Danio annulosus =

Scientific classification
- Kingdom: Animalia
- Phylum: Chordata
- Class: Actinopterygii
- Order: Cypriniformes
- Family: Danionidae
- Subfamily: Danioninae
- Genus: Danio
- Species: D. annulosus

Binomial name
- Danio annulosus S. O. Kullander, Rahman, Norén & Mollah, 2015

Species of fish

Danio annulosus is a species of Chain danio fish in the family Cyprinidae in Danio genus. The species is named and described jointly by Sven O Kullander, M.D Mizanur Rahman, Michael Noren and Abdur Rob Mollah in 2015 in association with the Department of Zoology, Swedish Museum of Natural History, Sweden and the Department of Zoology, University of Dhaka, Bangladesh. The study and paper on Danio annulosus was published in ZooTaxa both online and in print in the same year (2015). It was collected from a small pool at the bottom of the Shuvolong Falls in the Kaptai Lake system in Rangamati district in the Chittagong division, Bangladesh. The species name annulosus is derived from the neo-Latin word meaning "ringed", from the color pattern on the side of the fish which resembles a pattern of dark rings.

== Distribution ==
Danio annulosus is so far known only from a small pool below the Shuvolong waterfalls during the summer when the water was stand still in the pool. There is a good chance of finding them in Kaptai lake system formed by the damming of Karnafuli River, as a small stream drains the pool to kapati lake.

== Description ==
Danio annulosus is the 25th species of the Danio identified. Just like all the chain danios Danio annulosus has chain like pattern instead of the striped patterns of zebra danios. As all the chain danios, Danio annulosus has the same color pattern containing a series of dark rings with light color space beside it, a complete lateral line, 14 circumpendular scales, have the first ray in the pectoral fin and a black humeral spot. Danio annulosus is different from the rest of the Puntius species by many features such as a much shorter pecotal and pelvic fins, the humeral spot is a bit wider and deep, instead of round or deep wide. No sexual dimorphism is present in Danio annulosus.

== Coloration ==
Healthy adult individuals in life have dark stripes which include circles which are blue in color with the space in between including the circle centres are orange in color. A unique orange spot is seen in the front of the black cleithral spot.

== Holotype ==
The holotype DU 50001 is an adult individual and probable female, 71.5 mm in length and collected form a Chittagong Division, Rangamati District, Borokal, pool at bottom of Shuvolong Waterfall on 28 Nov 2014.
