= Devario assamensis =

Conservation status
- Vulnerable (IUCN 3.1)

Scientific classification
- Kingdom: Animalia
- Phylum: Chordata
- Class: Actinopterygii
- Order: Cypriniformes
- Family: Danionidae
- Genus: Devario
- Species: D. assamensis

Binomial name
- Devario assamensis (Barman, 1984)

Synonyms
- Danio assamensis Barman, 1984

Species of fish

Devario assamensis is a large danionin from the Assam and Mirik area of India. It grows to 6 inches and has a deep-red stripe along the length of its body, as well as the more usual yellow and blue stripes.
