= Danio flagrans =

Scientific classification
- Kingdom: Animalia
- Phylum: Chordata
- Class: Actinopterygii
- Order: Cypriniformes
- Family: Danionidae
- Subfamily: Danioninae
- Genus: Danio
- Species: D. flagrans

Binomial name
- Danio flagrans S. O. Kullander, 2012

Species of fish

Danio flagrans is a species of freshwater fish in the genus Danio found in the upper Mali Hka river drainage in northern Myanmar. It was described in 2012 by the Swedish biologist S. O. Kullander. The fish is red to orange, and is known to reach a length of 3.2 centimetres (1.3 in).
