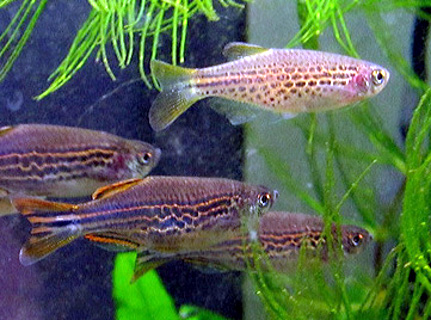
- Danio kyathit (above) and Danio quagga (below)

Conservation status
- Near Threatened (IUCN 3.1)

Scientific classification
- Kingdom: Animalia
- Phylum: Chordata
- Class: Actinopterygii
- Division: Teleostei
- Order: Cypriniformes
- Family: Danionidae
- Subfamily: Danioninae
- Genus: Danio
- Species: D. kyathit

Binomial name
- Danio kyathit F. Fang, 1998

= Danio kyathit =

Species of fish

Danio kyathit, also known as Ocelot danio, is a small, schooling species of fish in the family Danionidae. It is endemic to the upper reaches of Irrawaddy River near Myitkyina in northern Myanmar. Described in 1998, it is closely related to the better-known zebrafish or zebra danio, D. rerio.

== Description ==
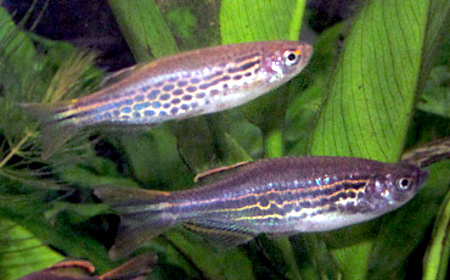
Danio kyathit and Danio quagga

A smallish danio with a maximum length of 6 centimetres (2.4 in), the females are thicker and less streamlined in the body than males. Danio kyathit had once two recognised colour morphs, a striped form known as the orange-finned danio but has now been described as Danio quagga, a spotted form known by the common name ocelot danio, which may be confused with the leopard danio.
