= Yoma danio =

Scientific classification
- Kingdom: Animalia
- Phylum: Chordata
- Class: Actinopterygii
- Order: Cypriniformes
- Family: Danionidae
- Subfamily: Danioninae
- Genus: Danio
- Species: D. feegradei

Binomial name
- Danio feegradei (Hora, 1937)

Species of fish

The yoma danio (Danio feegradei) is a species of freshwater ray-finned fish belonging to the family Danionidae. This species of danio is from Myanmar. It can grow up to 8 cm in length.

Although discovered by Hora in 1937, it was first exported in 2005.

These fish has an exceptional ability for jumping. It can jump vertically to a height of over a foot (0.3 m) and may jump in this manner repeatedly.

The Yoma danio is quite variable in appearance, with some specimens developing black bars.
