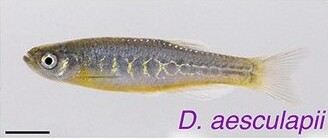

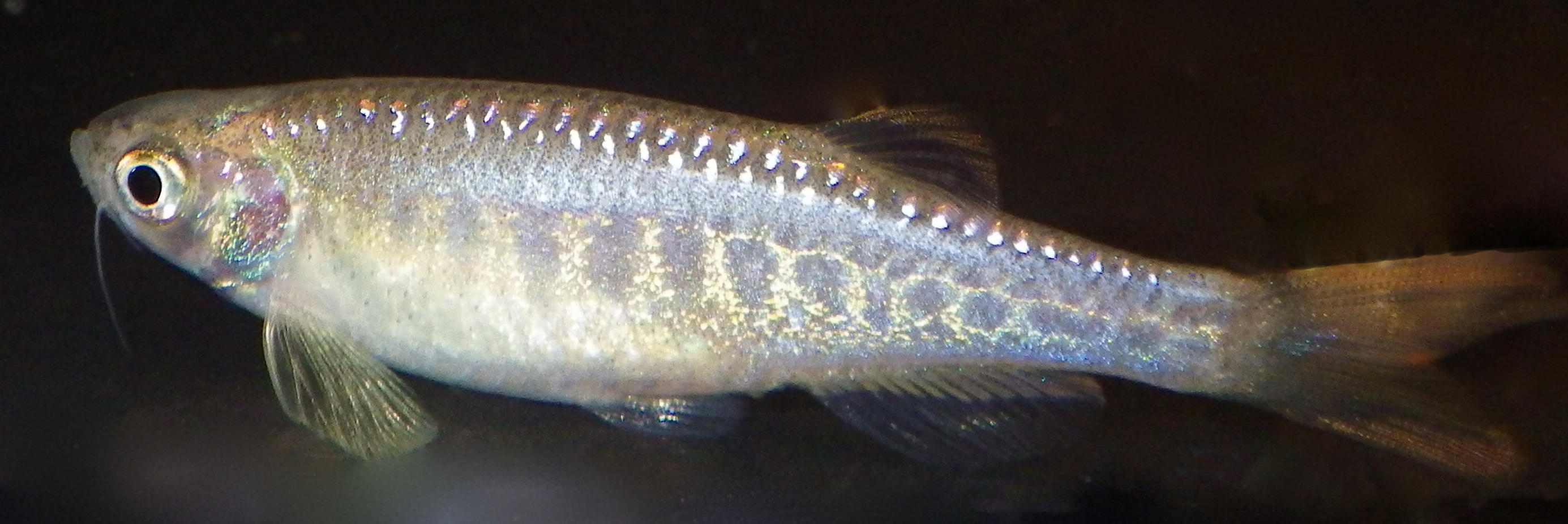

Conservation status
- Near Threatened (IUCN 3.1)

Scientific classification
- Kingdom: Animalia
- Phylum: Chordata
- Class: Actinopterygii
- Order: Cypriniformes
- Family: Danionidae
- Subfamily: Danioninae
- Genus: Danio
- Species: D. aesculapii

Binomial name
- Danio aesculapii Kullander & F. Fang, 2009

Synonyms
- Brachydanio aesculapii (Kullander & F. Fang, 2009)

= Panther danio =

Species of fish

The panther danio (Danio aesculapii) is a species of danio. Originating in Myanmar and Bangladesh, this fish can be kept in community tanks. Before its description it was referred to as Danio species TW03. The panther is a smallish danio which on first glance looks a little dull, but displays a variety of colours when sunlight illuminates the fish on its side.
