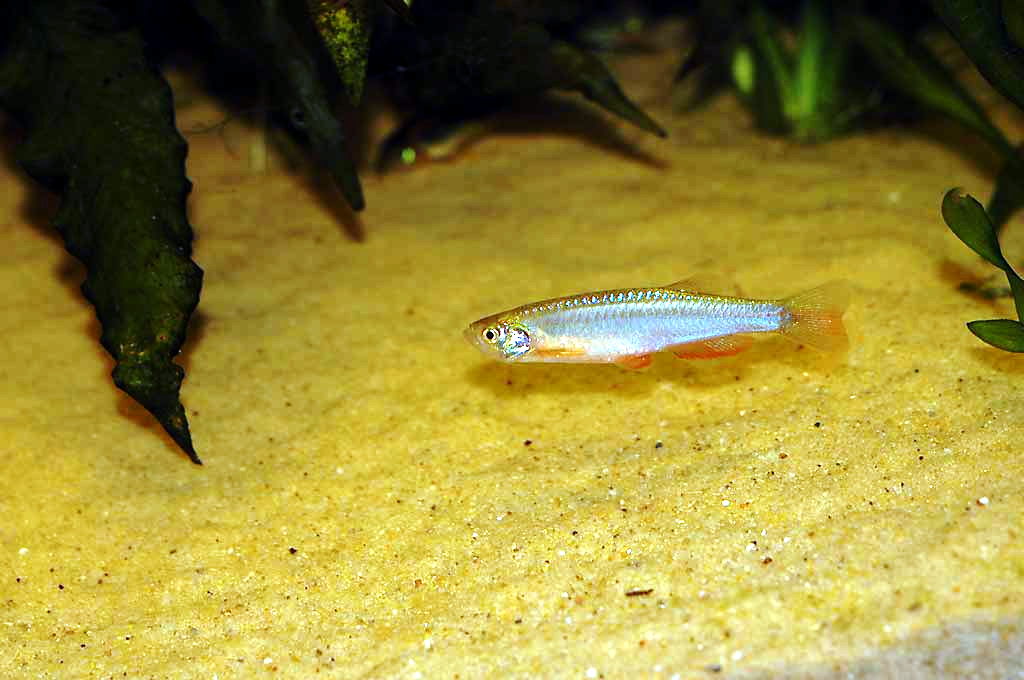

Conservation status
- Least Concern (IUCN 3.1)

Scientific classification
- Kingdom: Animalia
- Phylum: Chordata
- Class: Actinopterygii
- Order: Cypriniformes
- Family: Danionidae
- Subfamily: Danioninae
- Genus: Danio
- Species: D. albolineatus

Binomial name
- Danio albolineatus (Blyth, 1860)

Synonyms
- Brachydanio albolineatus Blyth, 1860; Danio albolineata Blyth, 1860; Danio stoliczae Day, 1870; Nuria albolineata Blyth, 1860

= Pearl danio =

Species of fish

The pearl danio (Danio albolineatus) is a tropical, freshwater ray-finned fish belonging to the family Danioinidae. Originating in Sumatra, Myanmar, and Thailand and Vietnam (Phu Quoc Island), this fish is sometimes found in aquariums by fish-keeping hobbyists. It grows to a maximum length of 2.6 inches (6.6 cm) and lives for around five years. The fish could have a brownish-yellow, pink, or a silver body and two light yellow/white or blue/red stripes. It has an iridescent look. The female fish has two pairs of barbels.

In the wild, the pearl danio is found in along the surface of small, clear rivers and hill streams. They live in a tropical climate with water with a 6.0 – 8.0 pH, a water hardness of up to 5 – 19 dGH, and a temperature range of 68–77 °F (20–25 °C). Their diet consists mostly of exogenous insects and zooplankton. The pearl danio is an egglayer. Golden varieties are often seen in shops; these are in reality semi-albino fish. The blue-redstripe danio (D. pulcher) and the Kedah danio (D. tweediei) were considered synonymous with this species, but Eschmeyer's Catalog of Fishes recognises them as valid, distinct species.
