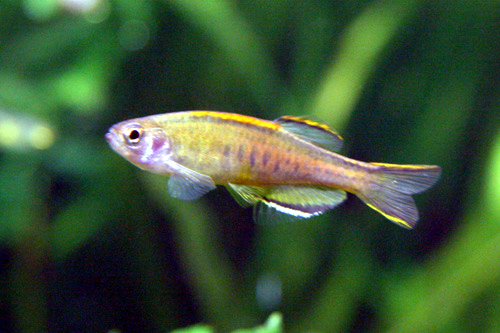

Conservation status
- Least Concern (IUCN 3.1)

Scientific classification
- Domain: Eukaryota
- Kingdom: Animalia
- Phylum: Chordata
- Class: Actinopterygii
- Order: Cypriniformes
- Family: Danionidae
- Subfamily: Danioninae
- Genus: Danio
- Species: D. choprae

Binomial name
- Danio choprae Hora, 1928

Synonyms
- Brachydanio choprae (Hora, 1928); Celestichthys choprae (Hora 1928)

= Glowlight danio =

Species of fish

The glowlight danio (Danio choprae) is a small, schooling fish closely related to the popular zebrafish Danio rerio. This should not be confused with the GloFish, a trademarked brand of fluorescent zebrafish that appear to glow in the dark under ultraviolet light.

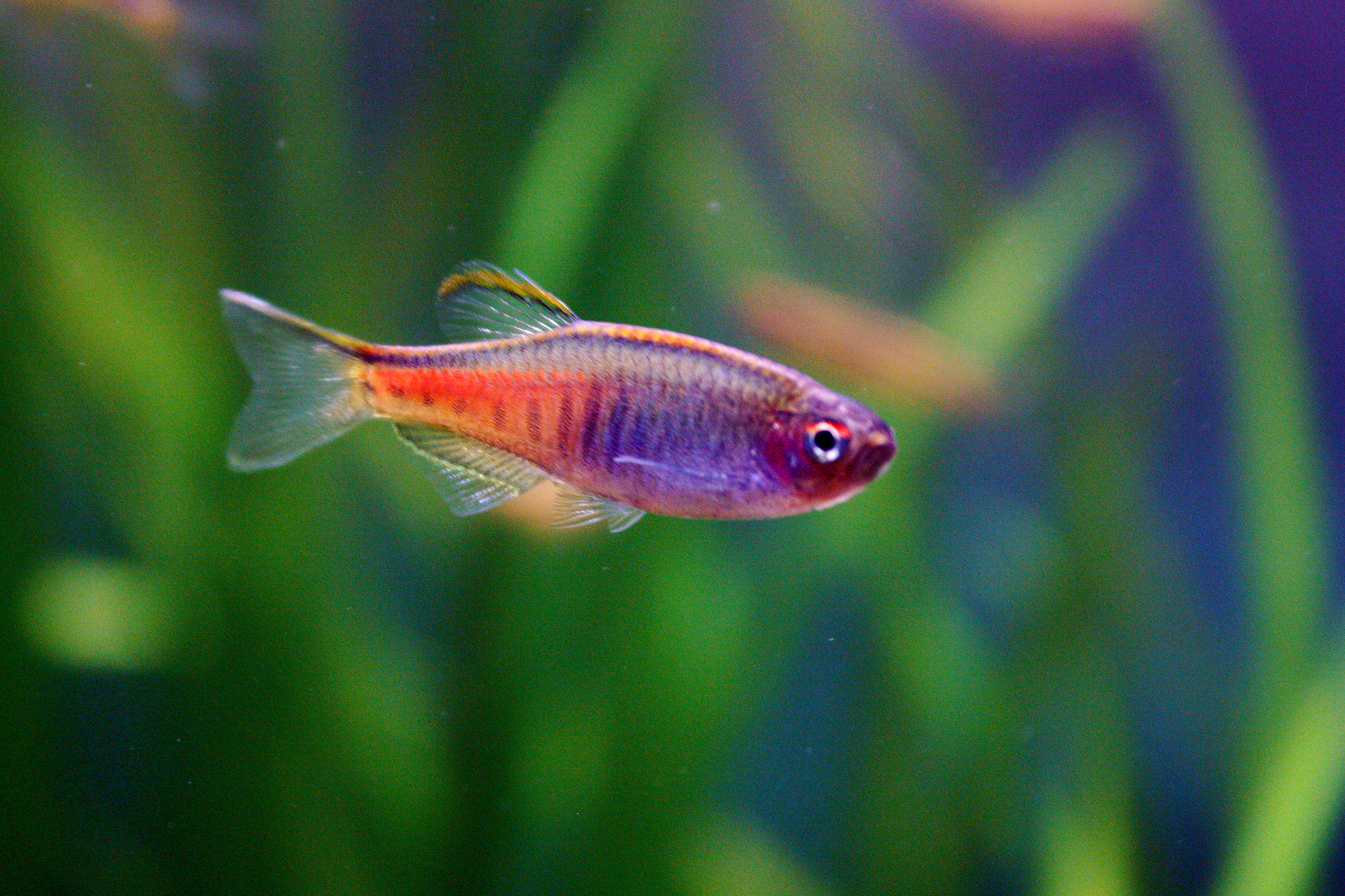
Glowlight danio

Danio choprae is an active danionin species that spends most of its time on mid-water levels. This species feeds on insects that have fallen into the water, aquatic insect larvae, and other small animals. In the aquarium, it accepts most foods offered, including most dry foods. It has a streamlined body marked with a brilliant orange longitudinal band and a series of vertical blue-black bars on the flanks. The fins are edged with yellow. In recent years, it has become quite widely traded as an aquarium fish, but otherwise has no commercial importance. Its common name derives from its similarity to the glowlight tetra, a South American characin only distantly related to this fish. They get on well with all other Danio species except the giant danio.

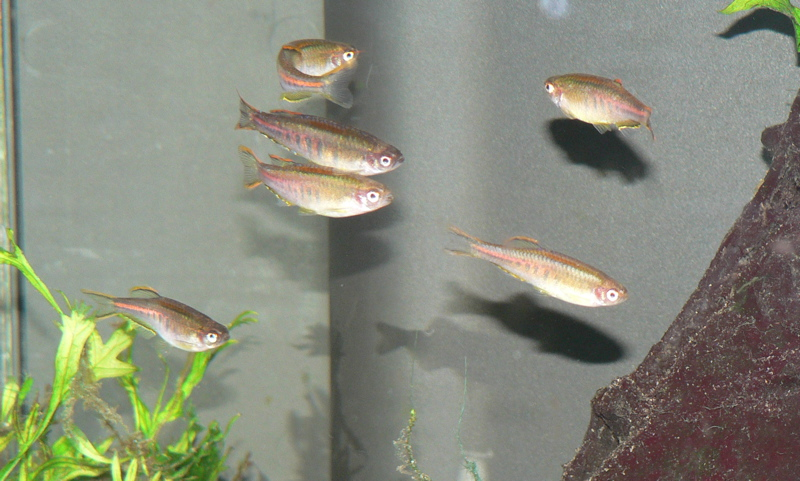

A less frequently traded geographical variant from the Putao area of northern Myanmar, known as the "northern glowlight danio", sometimes is referred to by a fictitious scientific name "Danio putaoensis". This variant is larger and has more vertical bars and longer barbels, it may refer to Danio flagrans.

== Description ==
- Maximum length: 3 – 4 cm
- Colors: Brown, yellow, green, red
- Temperature preference: 19–24°Celsius
- pH preference: 6 to 7
- Hardness preference: Soft to medium
- Salinity preference': Fresh water
- Compatibility: Good (but fast like most danios)
- Lifespan: Typically three years, can live 6+ years with good care
- Ease of keeping: Moderate
- Ease of breeding: Moderate to hard

== Etymology ==
S. L. Hora originally named this fish Danio choprae after Dr. B. N. Chopra. However, names ending in '-ae' are feminine and reserved for Latin names honouring women. Latin names honouring men usually end with '-i', and consequently the fish name sometimes is reported as Danio choprai.
