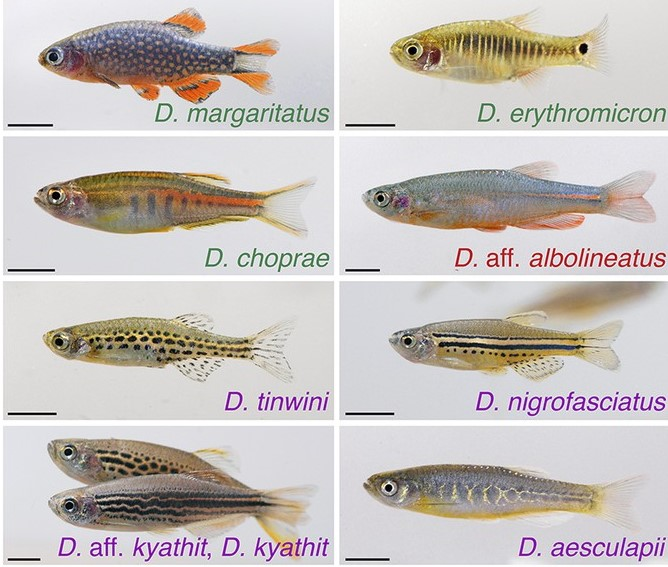
- Celestial pearl danio (D. margaritatus), emerald dwarf rasbora (D. erythromicron), glowlight danio (D. choprae), D. aff. albolineatus, Gold-ring danio (D. tinwini), dwarf danio (D. nigrofasciatus), D. aff. kyathit(D. quagga), D. kyathit, panther danio (D. aesculapii)

Scientific classification
- Kingdom: Animalia
- Phylum: Chordata
- Class: Actinopterygii
- Order: Cypriniformes
- Family: Danionidae
- Subfamily: Danioninae
- Genus: Danio; F. Hamilton, 1822

Type species
- Cyprinus (Danio) dangila Hamilton, 1822

Synonyms
- Brachydanio Weber & de Beaufort, 1916; Celestichthys Roberts, 2007

= Danio =

Genus of ray-finned fishes

Danio is a genus of small freshwater fish in the family Danionidae found in South and Southeast Asia, commonly kept in aquaria. They are generally characterised by a pattern of horizontal stripes, rows of spots or vertical bars. Some species have two pairs of long barbels. Species of this genus consume various small aquatic insects, crustaceans and worms.

== Taxonomy ==
The name "danio" comes from the Bangla name dhani, meaning "of the rice field". Danio was described in the early 19th century by Francis Hamilton. Two of the species included by him in the genus, still remain valid—D. dangila and D. rerio. About a century later (1916) and with many more species described in the meantime, the genus was split; the larger species into Danio and the smaller species into the genus Brachydanio. In 1991, though, the two genera were recombined; most larger species formerly within the genus Danio have now been reclassified into the genus Devario. Also, Brachydanio is now a junior synonym of Danio.

== Species ==
These are the currently recognized species in this genus:

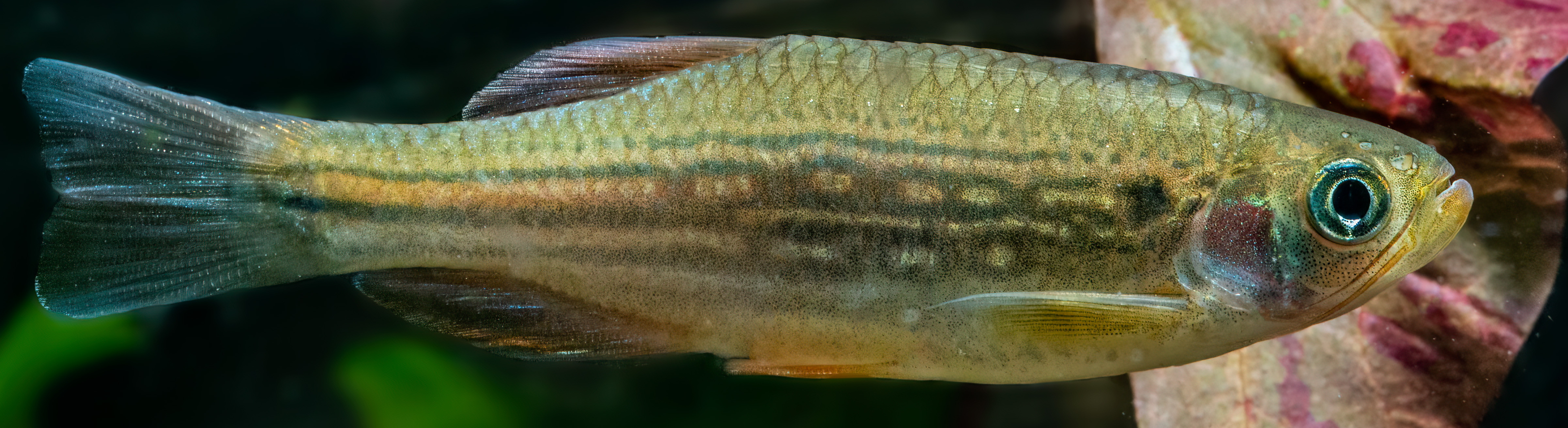
Moustached danio (D. dangila)

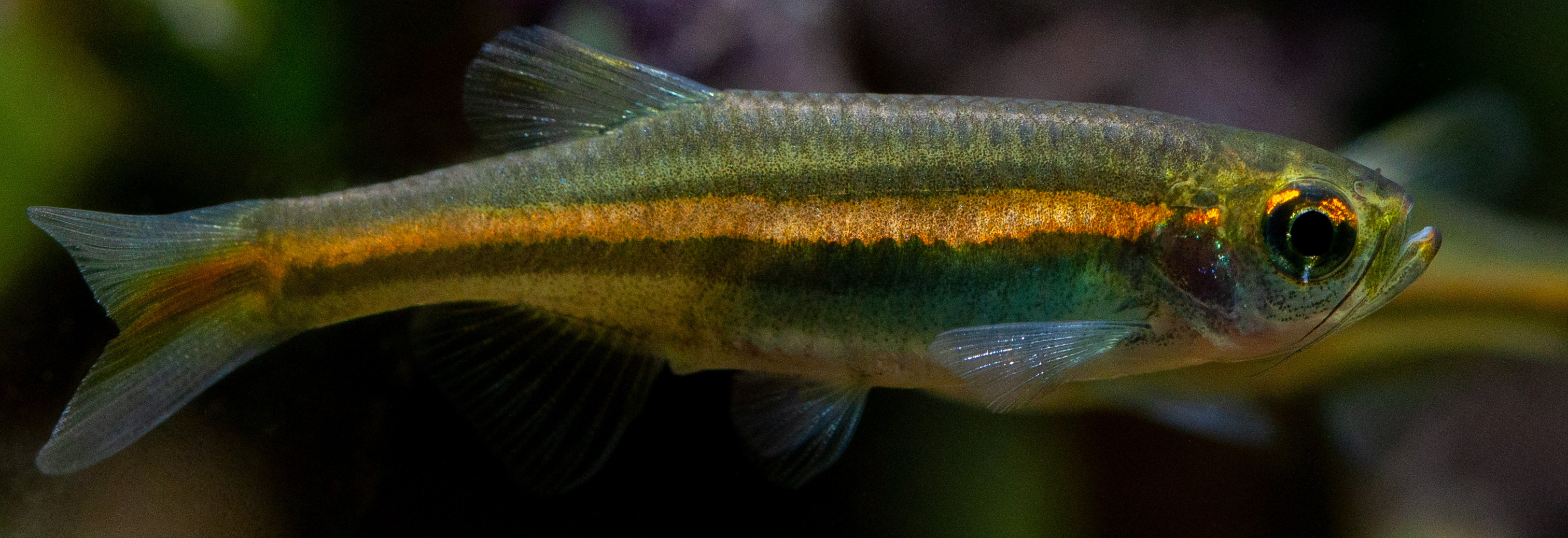
D. jaintianensis

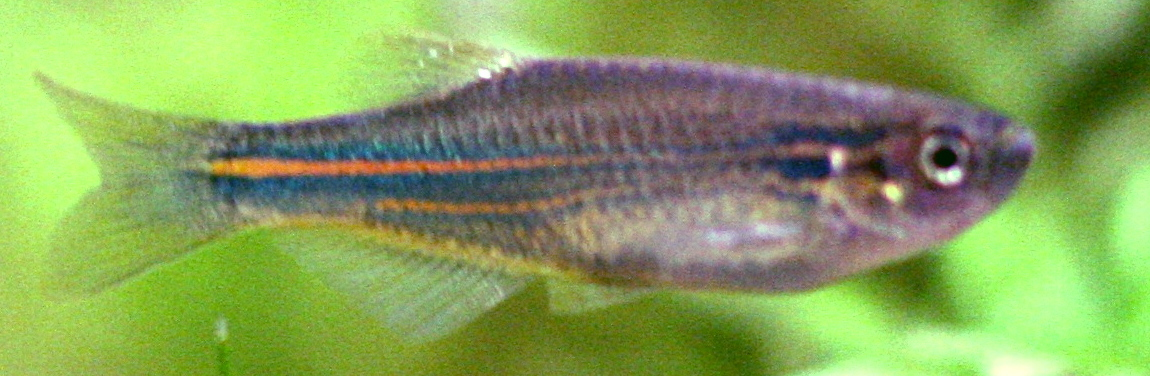
Blue danio (D. kerri)

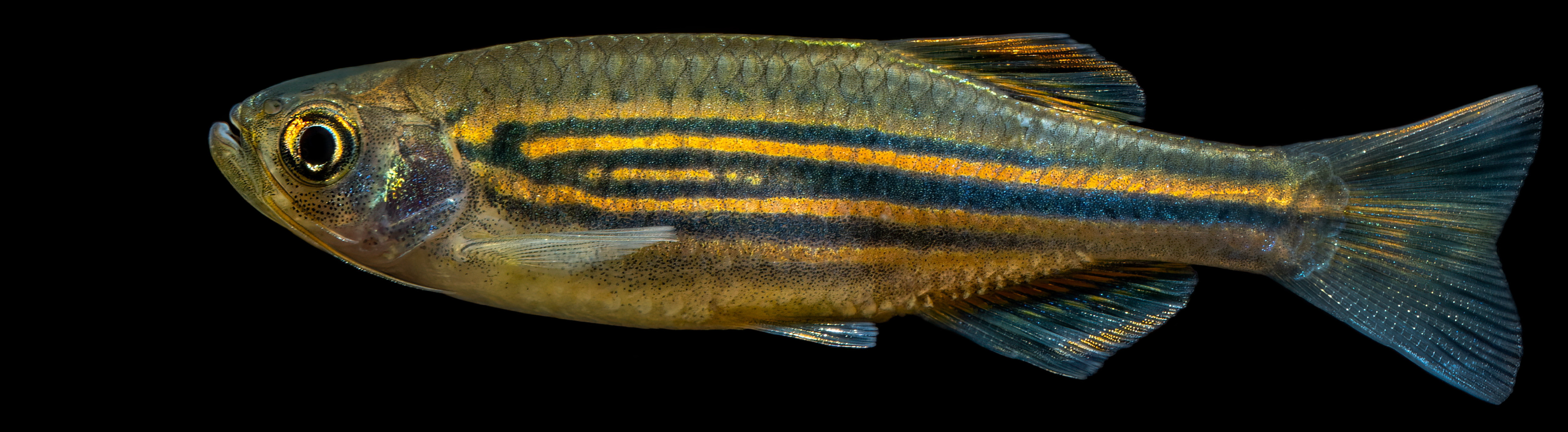
Meghalaya danio (D. meghalayensis)

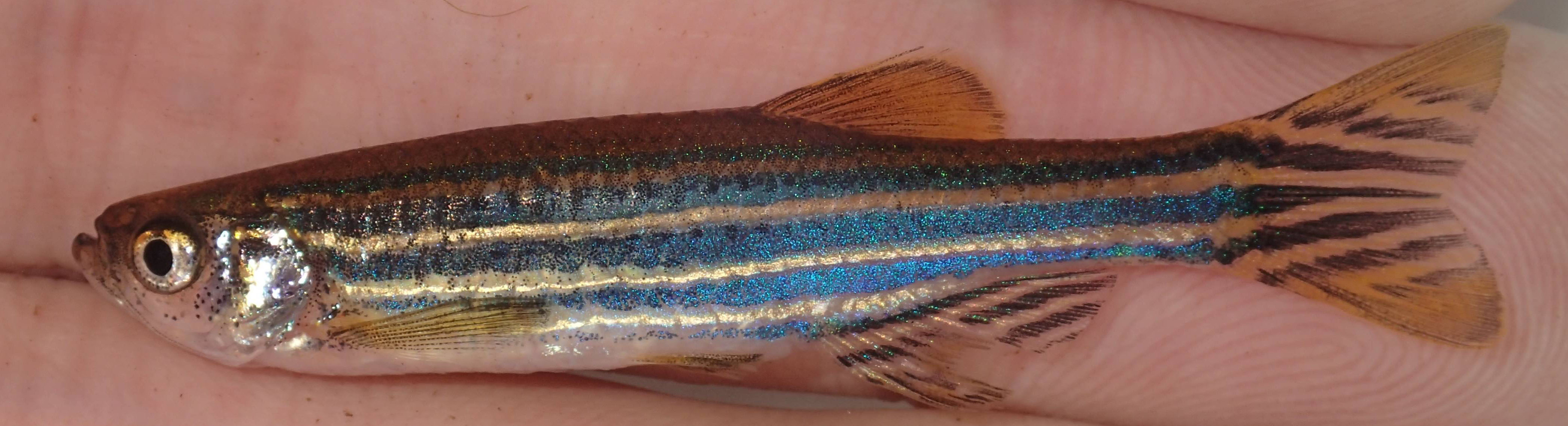
Zebra danio (D. rerio)

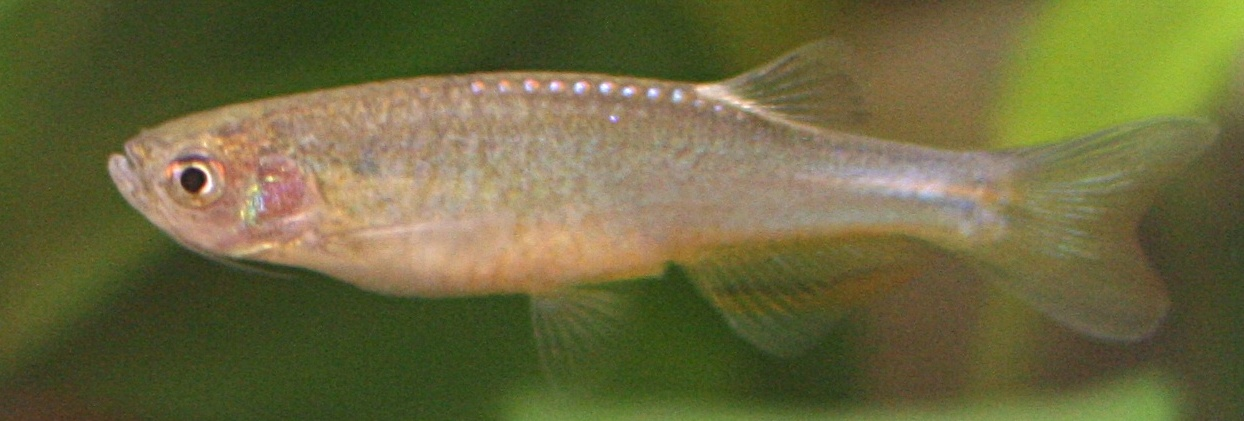
Rose danio (D. roseus)

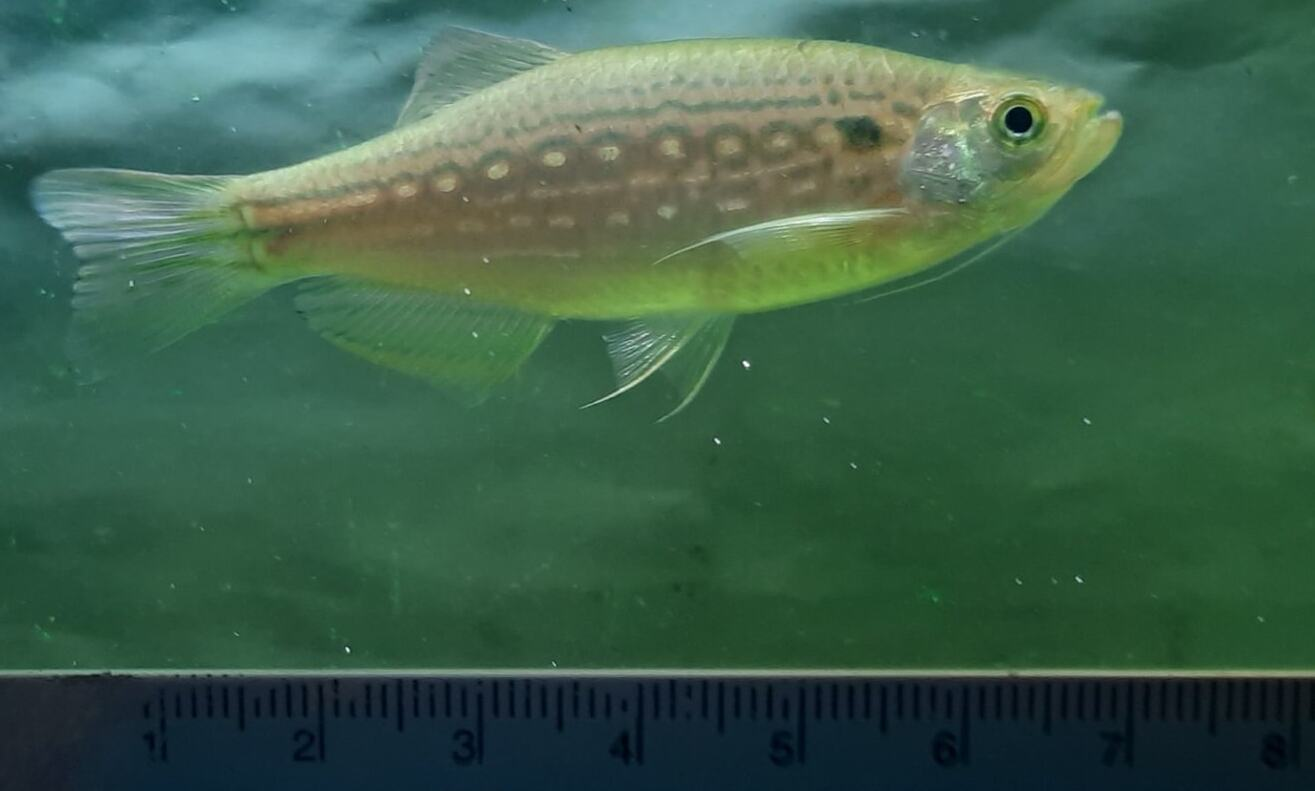
(D. sysphigmatus)

- Danio absconditus Kullander & Britz, 2015 (Black-barred danio)
- Danio aesculapii Kullander & F. Fang, 2009 (Panther danio)
- Danio albolineatus (Blyth, 1860) (Pearl danio)
- Danio annulosus Kullander, Rahman, Norén & Mollah, 2015
- Danio assamila Kullander, 2015
- Danio catenatus Kullander, 2015
- Danio choprae Hora, 1928 (Glowlight danio)
- Danio concatenatus Kullander, 2015
- Danio dangila (Hamilton, 1822)
- Danio dichromatus Britz & Kullander, 2024
- Danio erythromicron (Annandale, 1918)
- Danio feegradei Hora, 1937 (Yoma danio)
- Danio flagrans Kullander, 2012
- Danio htamanthinus Kullander & Norén, 2016
- Danio jaintianensis (N. Sen, 2007)
- Danio kerri H. M. Smith, 1931 (Blue danio)
- Danio kyathit F. Fang, 1998
- Danio margaritatus (Roberts, 2007)
- Danio meghalayensis Sen & S. C. Dey, 1985 (Meghalaya danio)
- Danio nigrofasciatus (Day, 1870) (Spotted danio)
- Danio pulcher H. M. Smith, 1931
- Danio quagga Kullander, T. Y. Liao & F. Fang, 2009
- Danio rerio (Hamilton, 1822) (Zebrafish)
- Danio roseus F. Fang & Kottelat, 2000 (Rose danio)
- Danio sysphigmatus Kullander, 2015
- Danio tinwini Kullander & F. Fang, 2009
- Danio tweediei Brittan, 1956
