= List of freshwater fish of Sumatra =

This is a list of freshwater fish species found in Sumatra, Indonesia. This list also includes freshwater fish found on small islands around Sumatra, such as Simeulue, Nias Islands, Mentawai Islands, Enggano, Riau Islands (except Natuna and Anambas), Lingga Islands, Bangka and Belitung. Island names written in brackets indicate that the species is endemic to that island, or is only known to occur on that island. The listing below is based on the taxonomic treatment of FishBase.

== Order Carcharhiniformes ==
=== Family Carcharhinidae ===
- Carcharhinus leucas (Müller & Henle, 1839)

== Order Rhinopristiformes ==
=== Family Pristidae ===
- Pristis pristis (Linnaeus, 1758)

== Order Myliobatiformes ==
=== Family Dasyatidae ===
- Fluvitrygon kittipongi Vidthayanon & Roberts, 2005
- Fluvitrygon signifer Compagno & Roberts, 1982
- Fluvitrygon oxyrhyncha (Sauvage, 1878)
- Urogymnus polylepis (Bleeker, 1852)

== Order Osteoglossiformes ==
=== Family Osteoglossidae ===
- Scleropages formosus (Müller & Schlegel, 1844)

=== Family Notopteridae ===
- Chitala borneensis (Bleeker, 1851)
- Chitala lopis (Bleeker, 1851)
- Notopterus notopterus (Pallas, 1769)

== Order Elopiformes ==
=== Family Megalopidae ===
- Megalops cyprinoides (Broussonet, 1782)

== Order Anguilliformes ==
=== Family Anguillidae ===
- Anguilla bengalensis (Gray, 1831)
- Anguilla bicolor McClelland, 1844

=== Family Muraenidae ===
- Gymnothorax tile (Hamilton, 1822)
- Gymnothorax polyuranodon (Bleeker, 1854)

== Order Clupeiformes ==
=== Family Ehiravidae ===
- Clupeichthys goniognathus Bleeker, 1855
- Clupeichthys perakensis (Herre, 1936)
- Clupeoides borneensis Bleeker, 1851
- Sundasalanx platyrhynchus Siebert & Crimmen, 1997

=== Family Engraulididae ===
- Coilia borneensis (Bleeker, 1852)
- Coilia lindmani Bleeker, 1858
- Lycothrissa crocodilus (Bleeker, 1851)
- Setipinna melanochir (Bleeker, 1849)

== Order Cypriniformes ==
=== Family Cyprinidae ===
- Albulichthys albuloides (Bleeker, 1855)
- Amblyrhynchichthys truncatus (Bleeker, 1851)
- Balantiocheilos melanopterus (Bleeker, 1851)
- Barbichthys laevis (Valenciennes, 1842)
- Barbodes sellifer (Kottelat & Lim, 2021)
- Barbodes binotatus (Valenciennes, 1842)
- Barbodes dorsimaculatus (Ahl, 1923)
- Barbonymus balleroides (Valenciennes, 1842)
- Barbonymus belinka (Bleeker, 1860)
- Barbonymus gonionotus (Bleeker, 1850)
- Barbonymus schwanenfeldii (Bleeker, 1854)
- Crossocheilus cobitis (Bleeker, 1854)
- Crossocheilus gnathopogon Weber & de Beaufort, 1916
- Crossocheilus langei Bleeker, 1860
- Crossocheilus oblongus Kuhl & van Hasselt, 1823
- Crossocheilus obscurus Tan & Kottelat, 2009
- Cyclocheilichthys apogon (Valenciennes, 1842)
- Cyclocheilichthys armatus (Valenciennes, 1842)
- Cyclocheilichthys heteronema (Bleeker, 1854)
- Cyclocheilichthys repasson (Bleeker, 1853)
- Cyclocheilos enoplos (Bleeker, 1850)
- Desmopuntius gemellus (Kottelat, 1996)
- Desmopuntius hexazona (Weber & de Beaufort, 1912)
- Desmopuntius johorensis (Duncker, 1904)
- Diplocheilichthys pleurotaenia (Bleeker, 1855)
- Eirmotus furvus Tan & Kottelat, 2008
- Eirmotus insignis Tan & Kottelat, 2008 (Belitung)
- Eirmotus isthmus Tan & Kottelat, 2008
- Epalzeorhynchos kalopterum (Bleeker, 1851)
- Hampala ampalong (Bleeker, 1852)
- Hampala macrolepidota Kuhl & van Hasselt, 1823
- Hypsibarbus birtwistlei (Herre, 1940)
- Hypsibarbus huguenini (Bleeker, 1853)
- Labeo chrysophekadion (Bleeker, 1850)
- Labeo erythropterus Valenciennes, 1842
- Labeo pietschmanni Machan, 1930
- Labiobarbus fasciatus (Bleeker, 1853)
- Labiobarbus festivus (Heckel, 1843)
- Labiobarbus leptocheilus (Valenciennes, 1842)
- Labiobarbus lineatus (Sauvage, 1878)
- Labiobarbus ocellatus (Heckel, 1843)
- Lobocheilos falcifer (Valenciennes, 1842)
- Lobocheilos ixocheilos Kottelat & Tan, 2008
- Lobocheilos schwanenfeldii Bleeker, 1854
- Mystacoleucus obtusirostris (Valenciennes, 1842)
- Mystacoleucus padangensis (Bleeker, 1852)
- Neobarynotus microlepis (Bleeker, 1851)
- Neolissochilus hexagonolepis (McClelland, 1839)
- Neolissochilus longipinnis (Weber & de Beaufort, 1916)
- Neolissochilus soro (Valenciennes, 1842)
- Neolissochilus soroides (Duncker, 1904)
- Neolissochilus sumatranus (Weber & de Beaufort, 1916)
- Neolissochilus thienemanni (Ahl, 1933)
- Oliotius oligolepis (Bleeker, 1853)
- Osteochilus bleekeri Kottelat, 2008
- Osteochilus borneensis (Bleeker, 1857)
- Osteochilus enneaporos (Bleeker, 1852)
- Osteochilus flavicauda Kottelat & Tan, 2009 (Bangka Belitung Islands)
- Osteochilus intermedius Weber & de Beaufort, 1916
- Osteochilus jeruk Hadiaty & Siebert, 1998
- Osteochilus kahajanensis (Bleeker, 1856)
- Osteochilus kappenii (Bleeker, 1856)
- Osteochilus kerinciensis Tan & Kottelat, 2009
- Osteochilus melanopleura (Bleeker, 1852)
- Osteochilus microcephalus (Valenciennes, 1842)
- Osteochilus scapularis Fowler, 1939
- Osteochilus schlegelii (Bleeker, 1851)
- Osteochilus serokan Hadiaty & Siebert, 1998
- Osteochilus spilurus (Bleeker, 1851)
- Osteochilus vittatus (Valenciennes, 1842)
- Osteochilus waandersii (Bleeker, 1852)
- Poropuntius tawarensis (Weber & de Beaufort, 1916)
- Puntigrus tetrazona (Bleeker, 1855)
- Puntioplites bulu (Bleeker, 1851)
- Puntioplites waandersi (Bleeker, 1859)
- Rohteichthys microlepis (Bleeker, 1851)
- Schismatorhynchos heterorhynchos (Bleeker, 1854)
- Striuntius lateristriga (Valenciennes, 1842)
- Striuntius lineatus (Duncker, 1904)
- Thynnichthys polylepis Bleeker, 1860
- Thynnichthys thynnoides (Bleeker, 1852)
- Tor tambra (Valenciennes, 1842)
- Tor tambroides (Bleeker, 1854)

=== Family Danionidae ===
- Boraras maculatus (Duncker, 1904)
- Brevibora cheeya Liao & Tan, 2011
- Brevibora dorsiocellata (Duncker, 1904)
- Danio albolineatus (Blyth, 1860)
- Kottelatia brittani (Axelrod, 1976)
- Laubuka laubuca (Hamilton, 1822)
- Luciosoma setigerum (Valenciennes, 1842)
- Luciosoma spilopleura Bleeker, 1855
- Luciosoma trinema (Bleeker, 1852)
- Malayochela maassi (Weber & de Beaufort, 1912)
- Pectenocypris korthausae Kottelat, 1982
- Pectenocypris micromysticetus Tan & Kottelat, 2009
- Pectenocypris nigra Wibowo, Ahnelt & Kertamihardja, 2016
- Pectenocypris rubra Ahnelt, Wibowo & Prianto, 2019
- Raiamas guttatus (Day, 1870)
- Rasbora api Lumbantobing, 2010
- Rasbora argyrotaenia (Bleeker, 1850)
- Rasbora arundinata Lumbantobing, 2014
- Rasbora bankanensis (Bleeker, 1853)
- Rasbora bindumatoga Lumbantobing, 2014
- Rasbora caudimaculata Volz, 1903
- Rasbora cephalotaenia (Bleeker, 1852)
- Rasbora dusonensis (Bleeker, 1851)
- Rasbora einthovenii (Bleeker, 1851)
- Rasbora elegans Volz, 1903
- Rasbora ennealepis Roberts, 1989
- Rasbora haru Lumbantobing, 2014
- Rasbora jacobsoni Weber & de Beaufort, 1916
- Rasbora kalbarensis Kottelat, 1991
- Rasbora kalochroma (Bleeker, 1851)
- Rasbora kluetensis Lumbantobing, 2010
- Rasbora lateristriata (Bleeker, 1854)
- Rasbora leptosoma (Bleeker, 1855)
- Rasbora maninjau Lumbantobing, 2014
- Rasbora meinkeni de Beaufort, 1931
- Rasbora myersi Brittan, 1954
- Rasbora nematotaenia Hubbs & Brittan, 1954
- Rasbora nodulosa Lumbantobing, 2010
- Rasbora paucisqualis Ahl, 1935
- Rasbora reticulata Weber & de Beaufort, 1915 (Nias)
- Rasbora rutteni (Weber & de Beaufort, 1916)
- Rasbora spilotaenia Hubbs & Brittan, 1954
- Rasbora subtilis Roberts, 1989
- Rasbora sumatrana (Bleeker, 1852)
- Rasbora tawarensis Weber & de Beaufort, 1916
- Rasbora tobana Ahl, 1934
- Rasbora tornieri Ahl, 1922
- Rasbora trilineata Steindachner, 1870
- Rasbora truncata Lumbantobing, 2010
- Rasbora vulcanus Tan, 1999
- Trigonopoma gracile (Kottelat, 1991)
- Trigonopoma pauciperforatum (Weber & de Beaufort, 1916)
- Trigonostigma hengeli (Meinken, 1956)
- Trigonostigma heteromorpha (Duncker, 1904)

=== Family Leptobarbidae ===
- Leptobarbus hoevenii (Bleeker, 1851)

=== Family Paedocyprididae ===
- Paedocypris progenetica Kottelat, Britz, Tan & Witte, 2006

=== Family Sundadanionidae ===
- Sundadanio atomus Conway, Kottelat & Tan, 2011 (Singkep)
- Sundadanio axelrodi (Brittan, 1976) (Bintan)
- Sundadanio gargula Conway, Kottelat & Tan, 2011 (Bangka)
- Sundadanio goblinus Conway, Kottelat & Tan, 2011

=== Family Xenocyprididae ===
- Macrochirichthys macrochirus (Valenciennes, 1844)
- Oxygaster anomalura van Hasselt, 1823
- Parachela cyanea Kottelat, 1995
- Parachela hypophthalmus (Bleeker, 1860)
- Parachela johorensis Steindachner, 1870
- Parachela oxygastroides (Bleeker, 1852)
- Rasborichthys helfrichii (Bleeker, 1857)

=== Family Balitoridae ===
- Balitoropsis ophiolepis (Bleeker, 1853)
- Balitoropsis zollingeri (Bleeker, 1853)
- Homaloptera ocellata van der Hoeven, 1830
- Homaloptera ogilviei Alfred, 1967
- Homaloptera orthogoniata Vaillant, 1902
- Homaloptera parclitella Tan & Ng, 2005
- Homalopteroides nebulosus (Alfred, 1969)
- Homalopteroides cf. tweediei (Herre, 1940)
- Homalopteroides wassinkii (Bleeker, 1853)
- Homalopterula amphisquamata (Weber & de Beaufort, 1916)
- Homalopterula gymnogaster (Bleeker, 1853)
- Homalopterula heterolepis (Weber & de Beaufort, 1916)
- Homalopterula modiglianii (Perugia, 1893)
- Homalopterula ripleyi Fowler, 1940
- Homalopterula vanderbilti (Fowler, 1940)
- Neohomaloptera johorensis (Herre, 1944)
- Pseudohomaloptera tecta Randall, Somarriba, Tongnunui & Page, 2022

=== Family Nemacheilidae ===
- Nemacheilus fasciatus (Valenciennes, 1846)
- Nemacheilus cf. kapuasensis Kottelat, 1984
- Nemacheilus longipinnis Ahl, 1922
- Nemacheilus papillos Tan & Kottelat, 2009
- Nemacheilus pfeifferae (Bleeker, 1853)
- Nemacheilus selangoricus Duncker, 1904
- Nemacheilus tuberigum Hadiaty & Siebert, 2001

=== Family Vaillantellidae ===
- Vaillantella euepiptera (Vaillant, 1902)
- Vaillantella maassi Weber & de Beaufort, 1912

=== Family Cobitidae ===
- Acantopsis dialuzona van Hasselt, 1823
- Acanthopsoides molobrion Siebert, 1991
- Kottelatlimia katik (Kottelat & Lim, 1992)
- Kottelatlimia pristes (Roberts, 1989)
- Lepidocephalichthys furcatus (de Beaufort, 1933)
- Lepidocephalichthys hasselti (Valenciennes, 1846)
- Lepidocephalichthys tomaculum Kottelat & Lim, 1992
- Lepidocephalus macrochir (Bleeker, 1854)
- Pangio alcoides Kottelat & Lim, 1993
- Pangio anguillaris (Vaillant, 1902)
- Pangio atactos Tan & Kottelat, 2009
- Pangio bitaimac Tan & Kottelat, 2009
- Pangio cuneovirgata (Raut, 1957)
- Pangio malayana (Tweedie, 1956)
- Pangio muraeniformis (de Beaufort, 1933)
- Pangio oblonga (Valenciennes, 1846)
- Pangio piperata Kottelat & Lim, 1993
- Pangio pulla Kottelat & Lim, 1993 (Bangka)
- Pangio semicincta (Fraser-Brunner, 1940)
- Pangio shelfordii (Popta, 1903)
- Pangio superba (Roberts, 1989)

=== Family Botiidae ===
- Chromobotia macracanthus (Bleeker, 1852)
- Syncrossus hymenophysa (Bleeker, 1852)
- Syncrossus reversus (Roberts, 1989)

=== Family Barbuccidae ===
- Barbucca diabolica Roberts, 1989

== Order Siluriformes ==
=== Family Bagridae ===
- Bagrichthys hypselopterus (Bleeker, 1852)
- Bagrichthys macracanthus (Bleeker, 1854)
- Bagrichthys macropterus (Bleeker, 1854)
- Bagrichthys micranodus Roberts, 1989
- Bagroides melapterus Bleeker, 1851
- Hemibagrus caveatus Ng, Wirjoatmodjo & Hadiaty, 2001
- Hemibagrus hoevenii (Bleeker, 1846)
- Hemibagrus capitulum (Popta, 1904)
- Hemibagrus lacustrinus Ng & Kottelat, 2013
- Hemibagrus velox Tan & Ng, 2000
- Hemibagrus wyckii (Bleeker, 1858)
- Hyalobagrus flavus Ng & Kottelat, 1998
- Leiocassis aculeatus Ng & Hadiaty, 2005
- Leiocassis bekantan Ng & Tan, 2018
- Leiocassis hosii Regan, 1906
- Leiocassis micropogon (Bleeker, 1852)
- Leiocassis poeciloptera (Valenciennes, 1840)
- Mystus abbreviatus (Valenciennes, 1840)
- Mystus alasensis Ng & Hadiaty, 2005
- Mystus bimaculatus (Volz, 1904)
- Mystus castaneus Ng, 2002
- Mystus gulio (Hamilton, 1822)
- Mystus nigriceps Valenciennes, 1840
- Mystus punctifer Ng, Wirjoatmodjo & Hadiaty, 2001
- Mystus singaringan (Bleeker, 1846)
- Mystus wolffii (Bleeker, 1851)
- Nanobagrus armatus (Vaillant, 1902)
- Nanobagrus stellatus Tan & Ng, 2000
- Nanobagrus torquatus Thomson, López, Hadiaty & Page, 2008
- Pseudomystus breviceps (Regan, 1913)
- Pseudomystus carnosus Ng & Lim, 2005
- Pseudomystus heokhuii Ng & Lim, 2008
- Pseudomystus leiacanthus (Weber & de Beaufort, 1912)
- Pseudomystus mahakamensis (Vaillant, 1902)
- Pseudomystus moeschii (Boulenger, 1890)
- Pseudomystus rugosus (Regan, 1913)
- Pseudomystus stenomus (Valenciennes, 1840)
- Sundolyra latebrosa Ng, Hadiaty, Lundberg & Luckenbill, 2015

=== Family Siluridae ===
- Belodontichthys dinema (Bleeker, 1851)
- Ceratoglanis scleronema (Bleeker, 1863)
- Hemisilurus heterorhynchus (Bleeker, 1854)
- Hemisilurus moolenburghi Weber & de Beaufort, 1913
- Kryptopterus bicirrhis (Valenciennes, 1840)
- Kryptopterus cryptopterus (Bleeker, 1851)
- Kryptopterus eugeneiatus (Vaillant, 1893)
- Kryptopterus limpok (Bleeker, 1852)
- Kryptopterus macrocephalus (Bleeker, 1858)
- Kryptopterus palembangensis (Bleeker, 1852)
- Kryptopterus piperatus Ng, Wirjoatmodjo & Hadiaty, 2004
- Kryptopterus schilbeides (Bleeker, 1858)
- Kryptopterus cf. vitreolus Ng & Kottelat, 2013
- Micronema hexapterus (Bleeker, 1851)
- Ompok brevirictus Ng & Hadiaty, 2009
- Ompok eugeneiatus Vaillant, 1893
- Ompok fumidus Tan & Ng, 1996
- Ompok leiacanthus (Bleeker, 1853)
- Ompok rhadinurus Ng, 2003
- Phalacronotus apogon (Bleeker, 1851)
- Phalacronotus micronemus (Bleeker, 1846)
- Silurichthys hasseltii (Bleeker, 1858)
- Silurichthys indragiriensis Volz, 1904
- Silurichthys schneideri Volz, 1904
- Wallagonia leerii Bleeker, 1851

=== Family Ailiidae ===
- Laides hexanema (Bleeker, 1852)

=== Family Horabagridae ===
- Pseudeutropius brachypopterus (Bleeker, 1858)
- Pseudeutropius moolenburghae Weber & de Beaufort, 1913

=== Family Pangasiidae ===
- Helicophagus typus Bleeker, 1858
- Helicophagus waandersii Bleeker, 1858
- Pangasius djambal Bleeker, 1846
- Pangasius kunyit Pouyaud, Teugels & Legendre, 1999
- Pangasius macronema Bleeker, 1850
- Pangasius nasutus (Bleeker, 1863)
- Pangasius polyuranodon Bleeker, 1852
- Pseudolais micronemus (Bleeker, 1847)

=== Family Akysidae ===
- Acrochordonichthys rugosus (Bleeker, 1847)
- Acrochordonichthys ischnosoma Bleeker, 1858
- Akysis fontaneus Ng, 2009
- Akysis galeatus Page, Rachmatika & Robins, 2007
- Akysis heterurus Ng, 1996
- Akysis scorteus Page, Hadiaty & López, 2007
- Breitensteinia cessator Ng & Siebert, 1998
- Parakysis grandis Ng & Lim, 1995
- Parakysis hystriculus Ng, 2009
- Parakysis longirostris Ng & Lim, 1995 (Bintan)
- Parakysis verrucosus Herre, 1940 (Bintan, Batam)
- Pseudobagarius macronemus (Bleeker, 1860)

=== Family Sisoridae ===
- Bagarius lica (Volz, 1903)
- Glyptothorax amnestus Ng & Kottelat, 2016
- Glyptothorax famelicus Ng & Kottelat, 2016
- Glyptothorax fuscus Ng & Kottelat, 2016
- Glyptothorax keluk Ng & Kottelat, 2016
- Glyptothorax ketambe Ng & Hadiaty, 2009
- Glyptothorax pedunculatus (Roberts, 2021)
- Glyptothorax platypogonides (Bleeker, 1855)
- Glyptothorax plectilis Ng & Hadiaty, 2008
- Glyptothorax robustus Boeseman, 1966
- Glyptothorax schmidti (Volz, 1904)

=== Family Chacidae ===
- Chaca bankanensis Bleeker, 1852

=== Family Clariidae ===
- Clarias aff. batrachus (Linnaeus, 1758)
- Clarias leiacanthus Bleeker, 1851
- Clarias meladerma Bleeker, 1846
- Clarias microspilus Ng & Hadiaty, 2011
- Clarias nieuhofii Valenciennes, 1840
- Clarias olivaceus Fowler, 1904
- Clarias teijsmanni Bleeker, 1857
- Encheloclarias curtisoma Ng & Lim, 1993
- Encheloclarias kelioides Ng & Lim, 1993
- Encheloclarias tapeinopterus (Bleeker, 1853) (Bangka)
- Encheloclarias velatus Ng & Tan, 2000

=== Family Ariidae ===
- Arius maculatus (Thunberg, 1792)
- Batrachocephalus mino (Hamilton, 1822)
- Cephalocassis melanochir (Bleeker, 1852)
- Cryptarius truncatus (Valenciennes, 1840)
- Hemiarius stormii (Bleeker, 1858)
- Hemiarius sumatranus (Anonymous [Bennett], 1830)
- Hemipimelodus borneensis (Bleeker, 1851)
- Hexanematichthys sagor (Hamilton, 1822)
- Ketengus typus Bleeker, 1846
- Kyataphisa nenga (Hamilton, 1822)
- Netuma bilineata (Valenciennes, 1840)
- Osteogeneiosus militaris (Linnaeus, 1758)
- Plicofollis argyropleuron (Valenciennes, 1840)
- Plicofollis dussumieri (Valenciennes, 1840)
- Plicofollis polystaphylodon (Bleeker, 1846)
- Plicofollis tonggol (Bleeker, 1846)

=== Family Plotosidae ===
- Plotosus canius Hamilton, 1822
- Plotosus lineatus (Thunberg, 1787)

== Order Beloniformes ==
=== Family Adrianichthyidae ===
- Oryzias javanicus (Bleeker, 1854)
- Oryzias hubbsi (Roberts, 1998)

=== Family Zenarchopteridae ===
- Dermogenys collettei Meisner, 2001
- Dermogenys sumatrana (Bleeker, 1854)
- Hemirhamphodon phaiosoma (Bleeker, 1852)
- Hemirhamphodon pogonognathus (Bleeker, 1853)
- Zenarchopterus ectuntio (Hamilton, 1822)

=== Family Belonidae ===
- Xenentodon canciloides (Bleeker, 1854)

== Order Cyprinodontiformes ==
=== Family Aplocheilidae ===
- Aplocheilus armatus (van Hasselt, 1823)

== Order Atheriniformes ==
=== Family Phallostethidae ===
- Neostethus bicornis Regan, 1916
- Neostethus lankesteri Regan, 1916
- Phenacostethus posthon Roberts, 1971
- Phenacostethus smithi Myers, 1928

== Order Batrachoidiformes ==
=== Family Batrachoididae ===
- Allenbatrachus grunniens (Linnaeus, 1758)

== Order Syngnathiformes ==
=== Family Syngnathidae ===
- Microphis boaja (Bleeker, 1850)
- Microphis brachyurus (Bleeker, 1854)
- Microphis deokhatoides (Bleeker, 1853)
- Microphis martensii (Peters, 1868)
- Microphis ocellatus (Duncker, 1910) (Simeulue, Nias)
- Hippichthys spicifer (Ruppel, 1838)

== incertae sedis ==
=== Series Carangaria ===
==== Family Polynemidae ====
- Polydactylus macrophthalmus (Bleeker, 1859)
- Polynemus dubius Bleeker, 1854
- Polynemus multifilis Temminck & Schlegel, 1843

==== Family Toxotidae ====
- Toxotes chatareus (Hamilton, 1822)
- Toxotes jaculatrix (Pallas, 1767)
- Toxotes sundaicus Kottelat & Tan, 2018

=== Series Ovalentaria ===
==== Family Ambassidae ====
- Ambassis interrupta Bleeker, 1853
- Gymnochanda filamentosa Fraser-Brunner, 1955
- Gymnochanda limi Kottelat, 1995
- Gymnochanda verae Tan & Lim, 2011 (Belitung)
- Parambassis apogonoides (Bleeker, 1851)
- Parambassis macrolepis (Bleeker, 1857)
- Parambassis sumatrana Ghazali, Lavoué, Sukmono, Wibowo, Hubert & Nor, 2026
- Parambassis wolffii (Bleeker, 1851)

=== Series Eupercaria ===
==== Family Monodactylidae ====
- Monodactylus argenteus (Linnaeus, 1758)

==== Family Sciaenidae ====
- Boesemania microlepis (Bleeker, 1859)
- Panna microdon (Bleeker, 1849)

== Order Centrarchiformes ==
=== Family Kuhliidae ===
- Kuhlia marginata (Cuvier, 1829)
- Kuhlia rupestris (Lacépède, 1802)

== Order Blenniiformes ==
=== Family Blenniidae ===
- Phenablennius heyligeri (Bleeker, 1859)
- Omobranchus zebra (Bleeker, 1868)

== Order Gobiiformes ==
=== Family Rhyacichthyidae ===
- Rhyacichthys aspro (Valenciennes, 1837)

=== Family Eleotridae ===
- Belobranchus segura Keith, Hadiaty & Lord, 2012
- Bunaka gyrinoides (Bleeker, 1853)
- Eleotris melanosoma (Bleeker, 1853)
- Eleotris sumatraensis (Mennesson, Keith, Sukmono, Risdawati & Hubert, 2021)
- Giuris margaritacea (Valenciennes, 1837)
- Hypseleotris cyprinoides (Valenciennes, 1837)

=== Family Butidae ===
- Bostrychus sinensis Lacepede, 1801
- Butis butis (Hamilton, 1822)
- Butis gymnopomus (Bleeker, 1853)
- Butis humeralis (Valenciennes, 1837)
- Butis koilomatodon (Bleeker, 1849)
- Butis melanostigma (Bleeker, 1849)
- Ophiocara porocephala (Valenciennes, 1837)
- Oxyeleotris marmorata (Bleeker, 1852)
- Oxyeleotris urophthalmoides (Bleeker, 1853)
- Oxyeleotris urophthalmus (Bleeker, 1851)

=== Family Oxudercidae ===
- Boleophthalmus boddarti (Pallas, 1770)
- Boleophthalmus dussumieri Valenciennes, 1837
- Oxuderces dentatus Eydoux & Souleyet, 1850
- Parapocryptes serperaster (Richardson, 1846)
- Periophthalmodon schlosseri (Pallas, 1770)
- Periophthalmodon septemradiatus (Hamilton, 1822)
- Periophthalmus argentilineatus Valenciennes, 1837
- Periophthalmus chrysospilos Bleeker, 1852
- Periophthalmus gracilis Eggert, 1935
- Periophthalmus novemradiatus (F. Hamilton, 1822)
- Periophthalmus spilotus Murdy & Takita, 1999
- Periophthalmus variabilis Eggert, 1935
- Pseudapocryptes elongatus (Cuvier, 1816)
- Scartelaos histophorus (Valenciennes, 1837)

=== Family Gobiidae ===
- Awaous grammepomus (Bleeker, 1849)
- Brachyamblyopus brachysoma (Bleeker, 1854)
- Brachygobius doriae (Günther, 1868)
- Brachygobius xanthomelas Herre, 1937
- Caragobius urolepis (Bleeker, 1852)
- Eugnathogobius siamensis (Fowler, 1934)
- Glossogobius giuris (Hamilton, 1822)
- Gobiopterus chuno (Hamilton, 1822)
- Hemigobius hoevenii (Bleeker, 1851)
- Lentipes argenteus Keith, Hadiaty & Lord, 2014
- Lentipes niasensis Harefa & Chen, 2022 (Nias)
- Mugilogobius chulae (Smith, 1932)
- Mugilogobius mertoni (Weber, 1911)
- Mugilogobius platystomus (Günther, 1872)
- Mugilogobius rambaiae (Smith, 1945)
- Pseudogobiopsis cf. festivus Larson, 2009
- Pseudogobiopsis lumbantobing Larson, Hadiaty and Hubert, 2017
- Pseudogobiopsis oligactis (Bleeker, 1875)
- Pseudogobiopsis paludosa (Herre, 1940)
- Pseudogobius avicennia (Herre, 1940)
- Pseudogobius melanosticta (Day, 1876)
- Pseudogobius poicilosoma (Bleeker, 1849)
- Redigobius balteatus (Herre, 1935)
- Redigobius bikolanus (Herre, 1927)
- Redigobius chrysosoma (Bleeker, 1875)
- Redigobius tambujon (Bleeker, 1854)
- Schismatogobius arscuttoli Keith, Lord & Hubert, 2017
- Schismatogobius bruynisi de Beaufort, 1912
- Schismatogobius saurii Keith, Lord, Hadiaty & Hubert, 2017
- Schismatogobius risdawatiae Keith, Darhuddin, Sukmono & Hubert, 2017
- Sicyopterus macrostetholepis (Bleeker, 1853)
- Sicyopterus micrurus (Bleeker, 1853) (Enggano)
- Sicyopterus squamosissimus Keith, Lord, Busson, Sauri, Hubert & Hadiaty, 2015
- Sicyopus zosterophorus (Bleeker, 1856)
- Stenogobius gymnopomus (Bleeker, 1853)
- Stigmatogobius pleurostigma (Bleeker, 1849)
- Stigmatogobius sadanundio (Hamilton, 1822)
- Stigmatogobius sella (Steindachner, 1881)
- Stiphodon atropurpureus (Herre, 1927)
- Stiphodon carisa Watson, 2008
- Stiphodon hadiatyae Nurjirana, Gustiano, Haryono & Wibowo, 2025
- Stiphodon maculidorsalis Maeda & Tan, 2013
- Stiphodon ornatus Meinken, 1974
- Stiphodon semoni Weber, 1895
- Taenioides cirratus (Blyth, 1860)
- Trypauchenopsis intermedia Volz, 1903

== Order Anabantiformes ==
=== Family Helostomatidae ===
- Helostoma temminkii Cuvier, 1829

=== Family Anabantidae ===
- Anabas testudineus (Bloch, 1792)

=== Family Osphronemidae ===
- Belontia hasselti (Cuvier, 1831)
- Betta andrei Tan, 2023 (Singkep)
- Betta bellica Sauvage, 1884
- Betta burdigala Kottelat & Ng, 1994 (Bangka)
- Betta chloropharynx Kottelat & Ng, 1994 (Bangka)
- Betta coccina Vierke, 1979
- Betta cracens Tan & Ng, 2005
- Betta dennisyongi Tan, 2013
- Betta edithae Vierke, 1984
- Betta falx Tan & Kottelat, 1998
- Betta foerschi Vierke, 1979 (Belitung)
- Betta fusca Regan, 1910
- Betta hipposideros Ng & Kottelat, 1994
- Betta iaspis Ding, Lei, Haryono, Shi, & Zhang, 2025
- Betta imbellis Ladiges, 1975
- Betta mulyadii Ding, Lei, Haryono, Shi, & Zhang, 2025
- Betta pardalotos Tan, 2009
- Betta persephone Schaller, 1986
- Betta pugnax (Cantor, 1849)
- Betta raja Tan & Ng, 2005
- Betta renata Tan, 1998
- Betta rubra Perugia, 1893
- Betta schalleri Kottelat & Ng, 1994 (Bangka)
- Betta simorum Tan & Ng, 1996
- Betta spilotogena Ng & Kottelat, 1994 (Bintan, Singkep)
- Betta uberis Tan & Ng, 2006 (Belitung)
- Luciocephalus aura Tan & Ng, 2005
- Luciocephalus pulcher (Gray, 1830)
- Osphronemus goramy La Cepède, 1801
- Parosphromenus bintan Kottelat & Ng, 1998
- Parosphromenus deissneri Bleeker, 1859 (Bangka)
- Parosphromenus gunawani Schindler & Linke, 2012
- Parosphromenus juelinae Shi, Guo, Haryono, Hong, & Zhang, 2021 (Bangka)
- Parosphromenus phoenicurus Schindler & Linke, 2012
- Parosphromenus sumatranus Klausewitz, 1955
- Sphaerichthys osphromenoides Canestrini, 1860
- Sphaerichthys selatanensis Vierke, 1979 (Belitung)
- Trichopodus leerii Bleeker, 1852
- Trichopodus trichopterus (Pallas, 1770)
- Trichopsis vittata (Cuvier, 1831)

=== Family Channidae ===
- Channa bankanensis (Bleeker, 1852)
- Channa cyanospilos (Bleeker, 1853)
- Channa limbata (Cuvier, 1831)
- Channa lucius (Cuvier, 1831)
- Channa marulioides (Bleeker, 1851)
- Channa melasoma (Bleeker, 1851)
- Channa micropeltes (Cuvier, 1831)
- Channa pleurophthalma (Bleeker, 1851)
- Channa striata (Bloch, 1793)

=== Family Nandidae ===
- Nandus mercatus Ng, 2008
- Nandus nebulosus (Gray, 1835)

=== Family Pristolepididae ===
- Pristolepis fasciata (Bleeker, 1851)
- Pristolepis grootii (Bleeker, 1852)

== Order Acanthuriformes ==
=== Family Lobotidae ===
- Datnioides microlepis Bleeker, 1854
- Datnioides polota (Hamilton, 1822)

=== Family Scatophagidae ===
- Scatophagus argus (Linnaeus, 1766)

== Order Synbranchiformes ==
=== Family Synbranchidae ===
- Monopterus javanensis Lacepède, 1800

=== Family Chaudhuriidae ===
- Bihunichthys monopteroides Kottelat & Lim, 1994
- Chendol keelini Kottelat & Lim, 1994
- Nagaichthys filipes Kottelat & Lim, 1991

=== Family Mastacembelidae ===
- Macrognathus circumcinctus (Hora, 1924)
- Macrognathus maculatus (Cuvier, 1832)
- Macrognathus tapirus Kottelat & Widjanarti, 2005
- Mastacembelus armatus (Lacepède, 1800)
- Mastacembelus notophthalmus Roberts, 1989
- Mastacembelus erythrotaenia Bleeker, 1850
- Mastacembelus unicolor Cuvier, 1832

== Order Pleuronectiformes ==
=== Family Cynoglossidae ===
- Cynoglossus feldmanni (Bleeker, 1854)
- Cynoglossus microlepis (Bleeker, 1851)
- Cynoglossus waandersii (Bleeker, 1854)

=== Family Soleidae ===
- Achiroides melanorhynchus (Bleeker, 1850)
- Achiroides leucorhynchos (Bleeker, 1851)
- Brachirus panoides (Bleeker, 1851)

== Order Tetraodontiformes ==
=== Family Tetraodontidae ===
- Auriglobus amabilis (Roberts, 1982)
- Auriglobus modestus (Bleeker, 1850)
- Auriglobus nefastus (Roberts, 1982)
- Carinotetraodon irrubesco Tan, 1999
- Chonerhinos naritus (Richardson, 1848)
- Dichotomyctere nigroviridis (Marion de Procé, 1822)
- Dichotomyctere ocellatus (Steindachner, 1870)
- Pao leiurus (Bleeker, 1851)
- Pao palembangensis (Bleeker, 1852)
