= Cinnamon loach =

Cinnamon loach may also refer to:

- Pangio oblonga
- Pangio pangia
