= Pangio elongata =

Scientific classification
- Kingdom: Animalia
- Phylum: Chordata
- Class: Actinopterygii
- Order: Cypriniformes
- Family: Cobitidae
- Genus: Pangio
- Species: P. elongata

Binomial name
- Pangio elongata Britz & Maclaine, 2007

Species of fish

Pangio elongata is a species of Cypriniformes fish in the genus Pangio.

== Footnotes ==
- Froese, Rainer; Pauly, Daniel (eds.). "Pangio elongata". FishBase.
