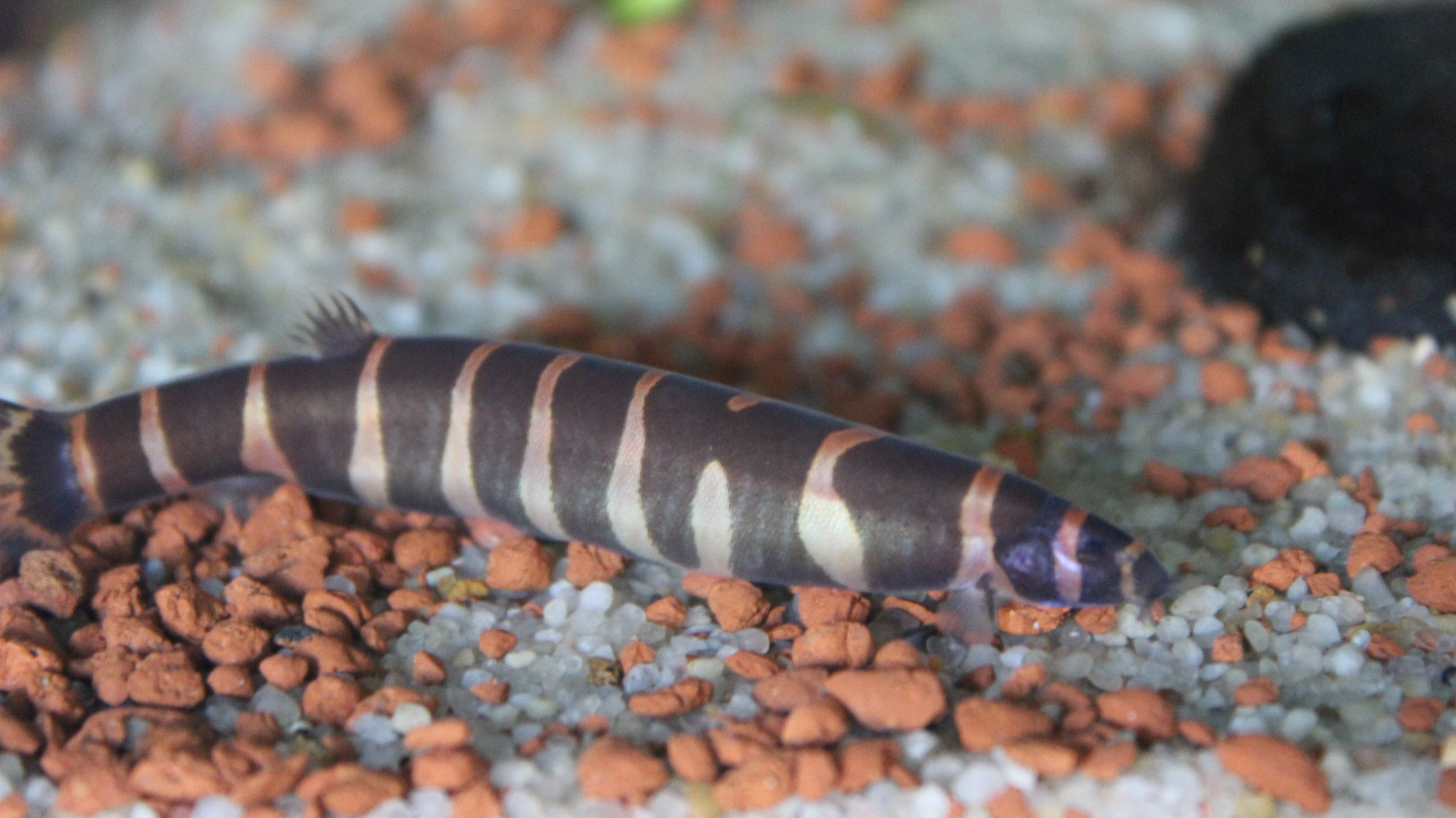
- Kuhli loach in an aquarium, commonly identified as P. kuhlii, but likely P. semicincta

Scientific classification
- Kingdom: Animalia
- Phylum: Chordata
- Class: Actinopterygii
- Order: Cypriniformes
- Family: Cobitidae
- Genus: Pangio; Blyth, 1860

Type species
- Cobitis cinnamomea McClelland, 1839

Species
- See text.

Synonyms
- Apua Blyth, 1860; Cobitophis Myers, 1927; Eucirrhichthys Perugia, 1892

= Pangio =

Genus of fishes

Pangio is a genus of small Asian freshwater fish in the true loach family Cobitidae. In earlier taxonomic schemes it was known as Acanthophthalmus. The "kuhli loach" is well-known in the aquarium trade and commonly identified as P. kuhlii, but most individuals actually appear to be P. semicincta.

The type species is Cobitis cinnamomea McClelland 1839, now known as Pangio pangia.

These fish are best represented in Southeast Asia where all but five of the species live, including the Greater Sunda Islands with sixteen species. The five species found outside Southeast Asia are from India and Myanmar. They inhabit a wide range of mostly calm waters such as streams, swamps (often peat swamps) and backwaters, but there are also species in fast-flowing waters, and one, P. bhujia, lives underground.

== Species ==
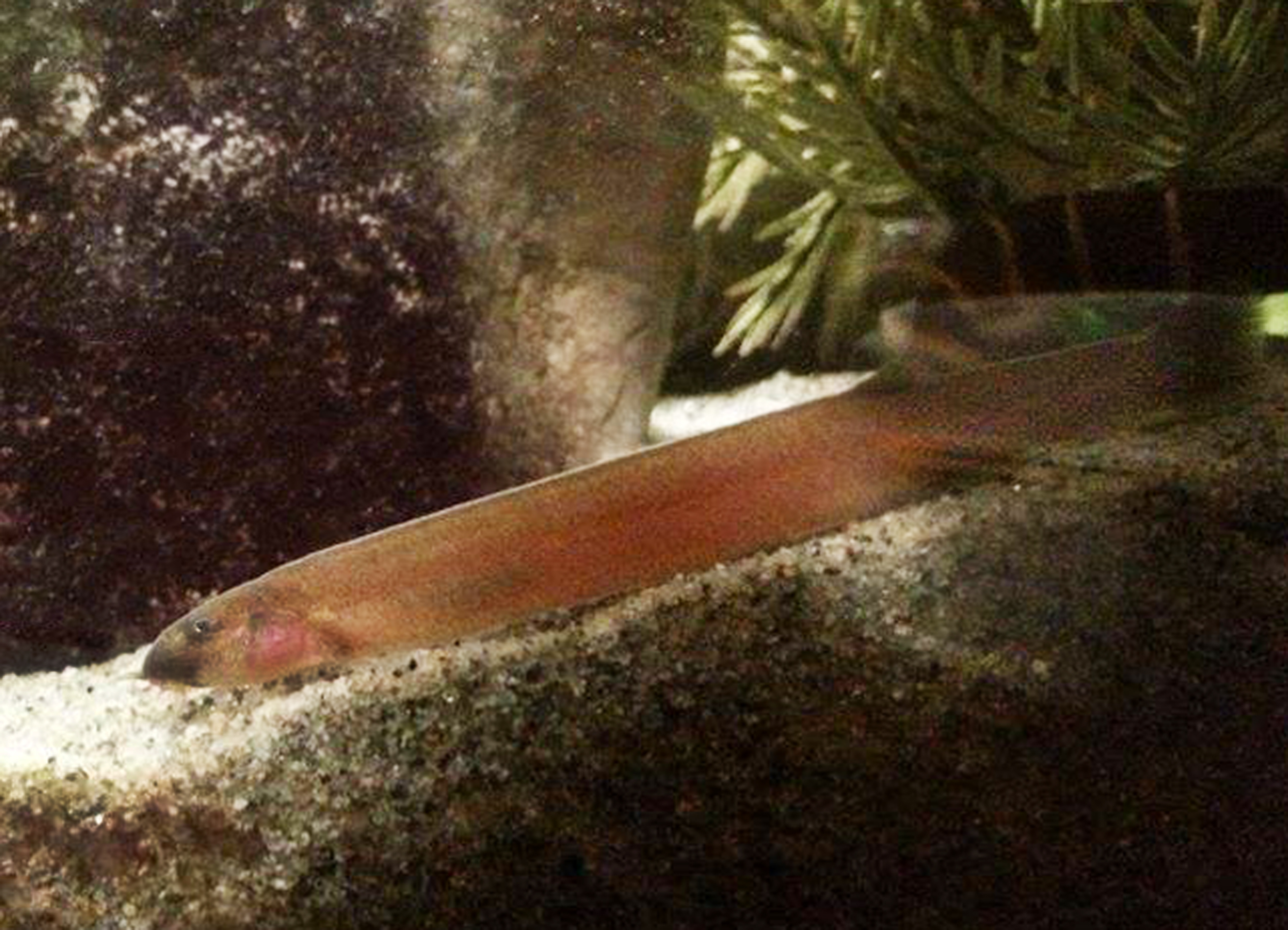
Pangio oblonga

There are currently 35 recognized species in this genus:

- Pangio agma (M. E. Burridge, 1992)
- Pangio alcoides Kottelat & K. K. P. Lim, 1993
- Pangio alternans Kottelat & K. K. P. Lim, 1993
- Pangio ammophila Britz, Anvar Ali & Raghavan, 2012
- Pangio anguillaris (Vaillant, 1902)
- Pangio apoda Britz & Maclaine, 2007
- Pangio atactos H. H. Tan & Kottelat, 2009
- Pangio bhujia Anoop et al., 2019
- Pangio bitaimac H. H. Tan & Kottelat, 2009
- Pangio cuneovirgata (Raut, 1957)
- Pangio doriae (Perugia, 1892)
- Pangio elongata Britz & Maclaine, 2007
- Pangio filinaris Kottelat & K. K. P. Lim, 1993
- Pangio fusca (Blyth, 1860)
- Pangio goaensis (Tilak, 1972) (Indian coolie-loach)
- Pangio incognito Kottelat & K. K. P. Lim, 1993
- Pangio kuhlii (Valenciennes, 1846) (Kuhli loach, coolie loach)
- Pangio juhuae (Sreenath K R,Aju K. Raju,Sandhya Sukumaran,Pradeep . B, 2025)
- Pangio lidi Hadiaty & Kottelat, 2009
- Pangio longimanus Britz & Kottelat, 2010
- Pangio longipinnis (Menon, 1992)
- Pangio lumbriciformis Britz & Maclaine, 2007
- Pangio malayana (Tweedie, 1956)
- Pangio mariarum (Inger & P. K. Chin, 1962)
- Pangio muraeniformis (de Beaufort, 1933)
- Pangio myersi (Harry, 1949)
- Pangio oblonga (Valenciennes, 1846) (Java loach)
- Pangio pangia (F. Hamilton, 1822)
- Pangio pathala Sundar, Arjun, Sidharthan, Dahanukar & Raghavan, 2022
- Pangio piperata Kottelat & K. K. P. Lim, 1993
- Pangio pulla Kottelat & K. K. P. Lim, 1993
- Pangio robiginosa (Raut, 1957)
- Pangio semicincta (Fraser-Brunner, 1940)
- Pangio shelfordii (Popta, 1903) (Borneo loach)
- Pangio signicauda Britz & Maclaine, 2007
- Pangio superba (T. R. Roberts, 1989)
