= William Plunkett =

William Plunkett may refer to:

- William Plunkett (highwayman), 18th-century British highwayman and associate of James MacLaine
- William C. Plunkett, lieutenant governor of Massachusetts (1854–1855)
- William Plunket, 1st Baron Plunket (1764–1854), Irish politician and lawyer who eventually became Lord Chancellor of Ireland
- William Plunket, 4th Baron Plunket (1828–1897), Church of Ireland Dean of Christ Church Cathedral and Archbishop of Dublin
- William Plunket, 5th Baron Plunket (1864–1920), British diplomat and administrator
- Billy Plunkett (1914–1960), Australian rules footballer for Geelong
