= Pangio lumbriciformis =

Scientific classification
- Kingdom: Animalia
- Phylum: Chordata
- Class: Actinopterygii
- Order: Cypriniformes
- Family: Cobitidae
- Genus: Pangio
- Species: P. lumbriciformis

Binomial name
- Pangio lumbriciformis Britz & Maclaine, 2007

Species of fish

Pangio lumbriciformis is a species of Cypriniformes fish in the genus Pangio.

== Footnotes ==
- Froese, Rainer; Pauly, Daniel (eds.). "Pangio lumbriciformis". FishBase.
