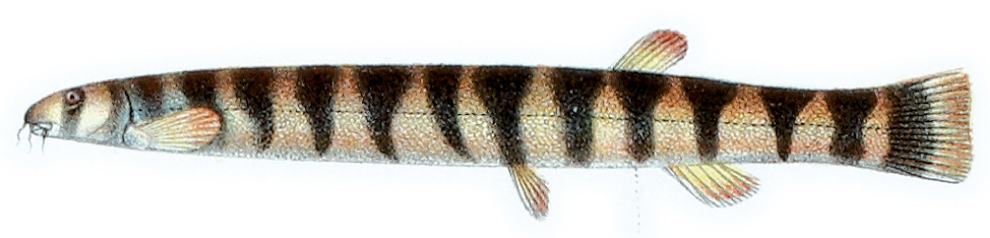

Conservation status
- Least Concern (IUCN 3.1)

Scientific classification
- Kingdom: Animalia
- Phylum: Chordata
- Class: Actinopterygii
- Division: Teleostei
- Order: Cypriniformes
- Family: Cobitidae
- Genus: Pangio
- Species: P. kuhlii

Binomial name
- Pangio kuhlii (van Hasselt, 1823)

Synonyms
- Acanthophthalmus fasciatus (van Hasselt); Cobitis kuhlii Valenciennes 1846

= Kuhli loach =

Species of fish

The true Kuhli loach (Pangio kuhlii), which can be used synonymously with "coolie" loach, occasionally referred to as eel loach, is a small eel-like freshwater fish belonging to the loach family (Cobitidae). They originate from the island of Java in Indonesia. This serpentine, worm-shaped creature is very slender and nocturnal. Its distinctive orange-pink coloration with triangular black stripes and long lifespan makes it a popular aquarium species.

== Description ==
The kuhli loach is an eel-shaped fish with slightly compressed sides (Anguilliform body structure), four pairs of barbels around the mouth, and very small fins. The dorsal fin starts behind the middle of the body, and the anal fin well behind this. The eyes are covered with transparent skin. The body has 10 to 15 dark brown to black vertical bars, and the gaps between them are salmon pink to yellow with a light underside. The stripes can be different on every individual but are mainly thick and solid stripes that can sometimes be split to reveal orange along the dorsal side. When the fish is not actively breeding, distinctions between males and females are not readily apparent. Males have a more muscular dorsal cross-section. Additionally, their pectoral fins tend to be larger and more paddle-shaped, often containing pigment. When breeding, the females often become larger than the male and their greenish ovaries can be seen through the skin before spawning. Spawning is not easy, but when it occurs a few hundred greenish eggs are laid among the roots of floating plants. Kuhli loaches reach maturity at 2 3/4 inches (7 cm) and have a maximum length of 4 inches (10 cm). This fish can live for up to about 14 years. They also have a spine below each eye that can be deployed as a defense mechanism that can harm any potential predators.

== Distribution ==
Kuhli loaches are from the island of Java, Indonesia, and additionally can be found in Malaysia, Sumatra. They are found throughout the Sunda shelf (excluding Sarawak) and Thailand. They have been reportedly found in China, though there are suspicions that it is a case of misidentification of perhaps a different Pangio species. The abundance of this species is unknown.

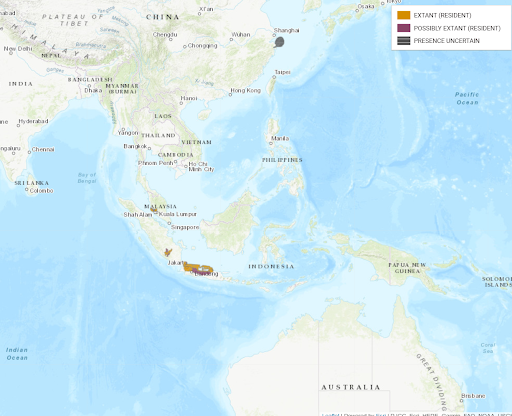
Kuhli Loach range, with a legend giving extant residents in orange, possible extant residents in purple, and uncertain residents in gray.

== Similar species ==
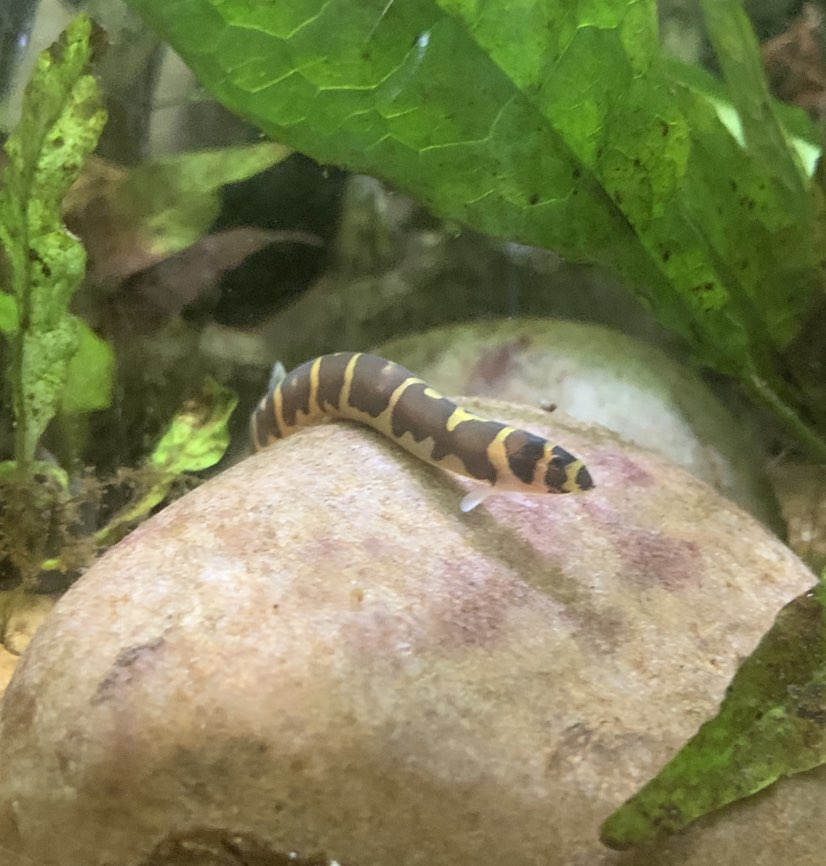
Pangio semicincta photographed in an aquarium. Given their morphology and their phenotypical traits, it is nearly impossible to distinguish these from Pangio kuhlii.

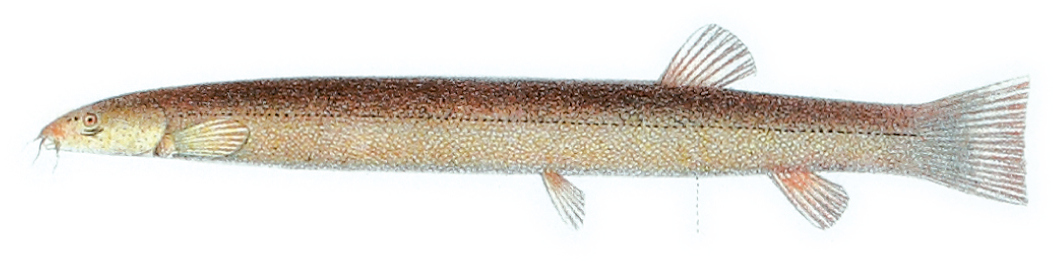
Pangio oblonga, another similar species in shape and size- often under the umbrella of "kuhli loach."

Cobitidae, the family to which the kuhli loach falls under, has 19 genera. Many of the other true loaches in this family have a similar body structure as the kuhli loach- slender and elongated. Particularly, the Pangio (formerly Acanthophthalmus) genus has understudied diversity within it and can be formed into three different groups: anguillaris, kuhlii-oblonga, and shelfordii. These groups combined result in around 30 species, but further analysis could reveal additional species within Pangio. This usually results in species that are hard to distinguish from one another. The most common mistake is between Pangio kuhlii and Pangio semicincta as they are often sold under the same common title of 'kuhli loach.' There is not enough sampling of the elusive Pangio kuhlii to confidently separate the two, and are often used conversely. Another species similar to Pangio kuhlii is Pangio myersi, the Giant kuhli loach, which can be found in Thailand and has a much similar, yet larger, structure. Overall, the term "kuhli loach" captures many mislabeled species (especially in the pet trade) and they can be nearly impossible to distinguish visually.

== Ecology ==
The natural habitat of the kuhli loach is the sandy beds of slow-moving rivers and clean mountain streams. They prefer shallow waters and can be found in dam peripheries, reservoirs, and swamps. They like to congregate where the sun cannot reach them, often in shallow, muddy pools. These habitats usually have places to hide, such as a substantial amount of leaf litter and other plant material. They are a social fish and are typically found in small clusters (they are not schooling fish but enjoy the company of their species), but are cautious and nocturnal by nature and swim near the bottom where they feed around obstacles. In the wild, kuhli loaches spawn synchronously in very shallow water. The kuhli loach is a bottom dweller that burrows into soft places.

If the water is turbid they can breathe air through a mechanism called facultative breathing, which allows them to live in below favorable conditions.

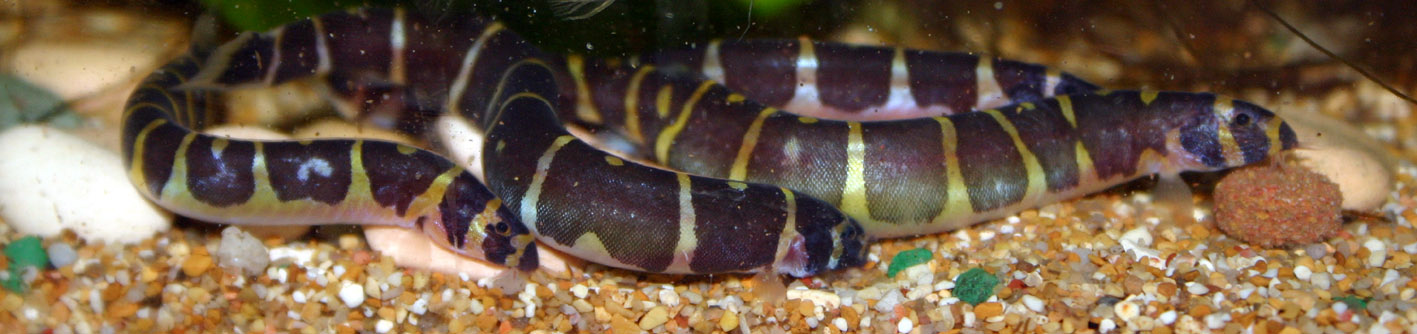
A group of kuhli loaches (Pangio kuhlii) in an aquarium. You can see here their differing coloration and stripes per individual, as well as their eel-like bodies and barbels.

== Etymology ==
The kuhli loach was originally described as Cobitis kuhlii by Achille Valenciennes in 1846 to commemorate Heinrich Kuhl's work as a naturalist and zoologist. In scientific literature, it has been referred to as Acanthophthalmus kuhlii. The genus name Acanthophthalmus is a junior synonym of Pangio. Its older generic name 'Acanthophthalmus' comes from the meaning 'thorn' or 'prickle-eye', after a spine beneath each eye.

== Sexual dimorphism ==
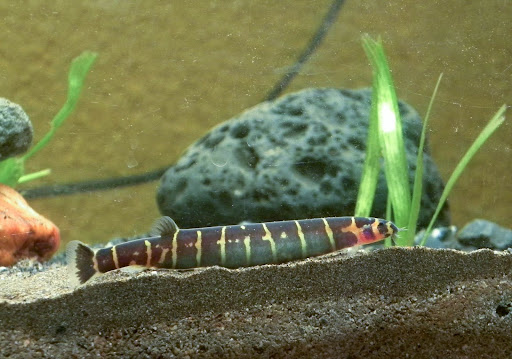
A large female kuhli loach with visible green ovaries.

There is evidence of sexual dimorphism in this species with studies showing that males have one hard ray in their pectoral fins and 7–8 weak rays, while females have no hard ray and 8–10 weak rays. Head depth also could be a potential sex-differentiating characteristic, revealing that males might be able to prey on harder food, while females might feed on softer substances. Additionally, there is a difference of sexes in body depth, with females having more body depth (dorsal to ventral measured vertically), which could potentially serve as a benefit for females in reproduction. However, their body length and coloration are the same throughout both males and females of this species.

== In aquaria ==
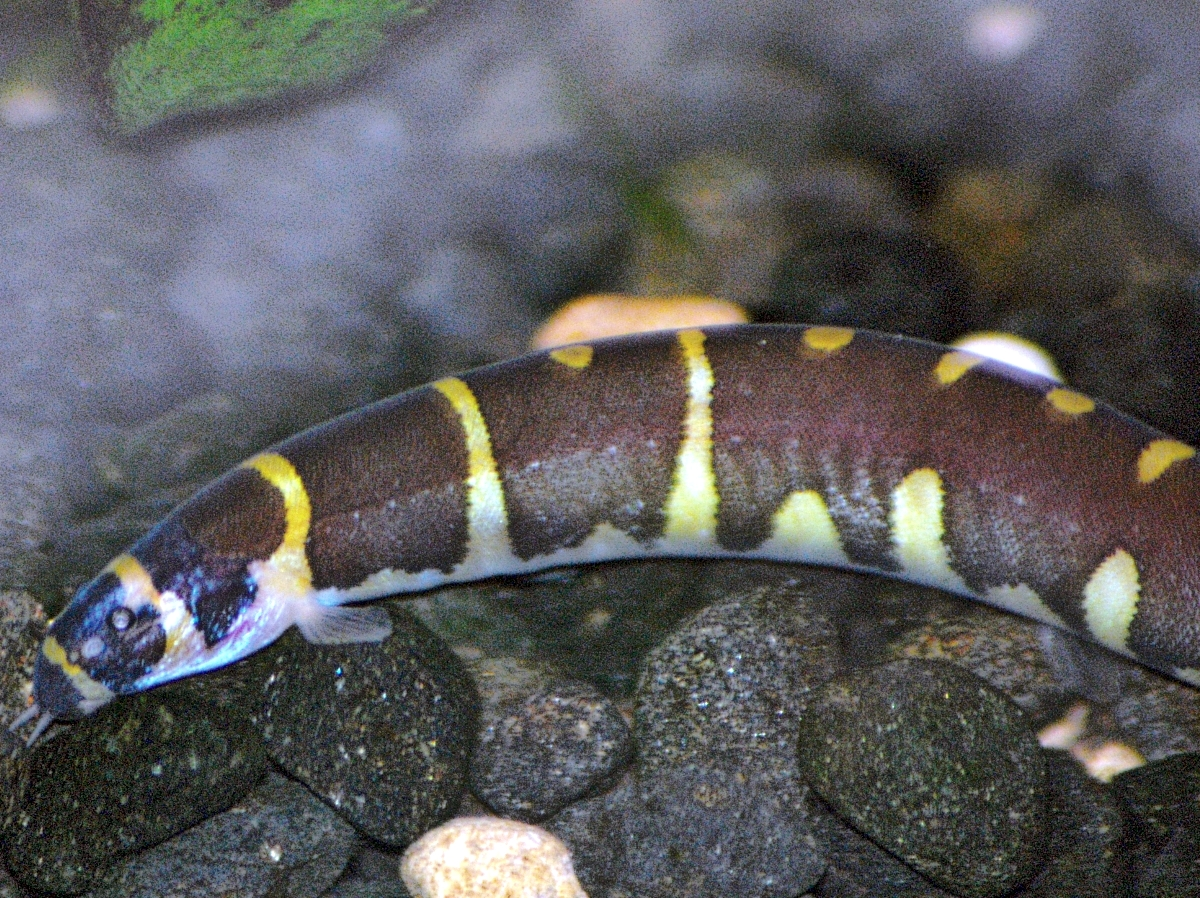
Kuhli loach

While striped Pangio loaches are a common in aquaria, the true P. kuhlii is rarely, if ever, kept. This is due to the fact that they are endemic to Indonesia Java, where collection of ornamental fish is extremely rare. There are many who doubt P. kuhlii has ever even made it into the private aquarium trade.

There are a number of species of the genus Pangio, primarily P. semicincta, that appear similar and are sold under the same name, require similar care, and are all excellently suited for household tanks. They tend to be hardy and long-lived in the aquarium and get along well with their own kind as well as others. Kuhli loaches can have nearly a 10-year lifespan, sometimes reaching as far as 14 years in captivity, making them great aquarium fish.

In an aquarium environment, especially if the gravel is suitably finely grained, Pangio species can burrow into the bottom and there remain unseen for long periods of time, emerging to eat during the night. If the gravel is later disturbed, a hobbyist might well find themselves faced with fish assumed lost a long time ago. They may also occasionally swim into unprotected filter inlets, possibly leading to their deaths. Since they are quite thin and lanky they can often get themselves into small places, even sometimes escaping the tank. Additionally, kuhli loaches can succumb to various common aquaria diseases such as dropsy, ich, fin rot, and cottonmouth.

Kuhli loaches need spaces to burrow and hide. Planted aquariums allow kuhlis the opportunity to better hide themselves and feel more comfortable, and they will not consume any of the plants. Additional hiding places can be provided by items like driftwood and typical aquarium decor that has small spaces to wriggle into. They can easily harm their barbels and soft, scale-less bodies, so sharp decor and non-sand substrate are not recommended for this nocturnal species. This species is shy and strays away from bright light, preferring to stay around the bottom of the tank. They are friendly with other tank mates (they will not attack nor eat them) and prefer to be in large groups of other kuhlis (typically 5 or more). With more individuals in the tank, kuhli loaches tend to be more active and less shy. Kuhli loach groups of this size can be kept in 20-gallon aquariums but can be housed in something larger if given enough hiding places. Other species that make good tank mates include tetras, minnows, shrimp, corydora, danio, rasbora, and other non-aggressive fish.

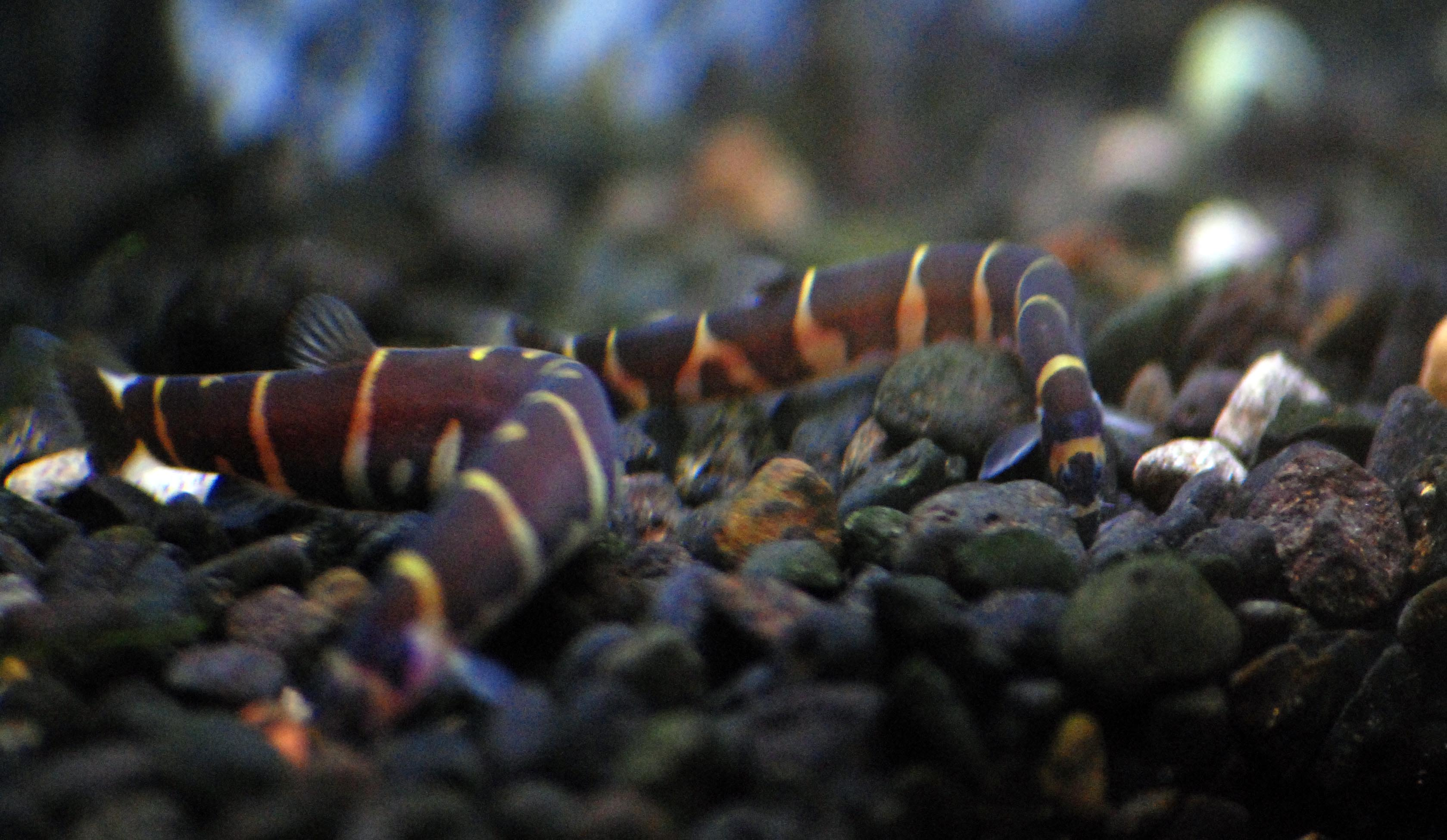
A pair of kuhli loaches foraging in a black-gravel substrate aquarium.

Pangio loaches natively live in a tropical climate and prefer water with a 5.5 – 6.5 pH-but will tolerate 7.0 pH in aquaria, a water hardness of 5.0 dGH, and a temperature range of 75–86 °F (24–30 °C). Pangio loaches are scavengers, so they will eat anything that reaches the bottom. They consume many different types of sinking pellets, flakes, and even shrimp/bloodworms. They usually feed at night, but can be taught to feed in the day in the home aquarium. However, if the tank mates eat all the food before any reaches the bottom, it is recommended to feed them at night so they can get their fill. The tank should be maintained and cleaned up weekly with water changes, but full water changes are not necessary and may potentially harm the fish.

Breeding in captivity requires plenty of hiding spaces and consistent water quality. It can prove to be a challenge if the conditions are not perfect. For the best chances of successful breeding, isolating the population of kuhli loaches in a separate tank away from any other species is recommended. Most of the successful attempts at breeding this species in captivity are with the help of hormone injections to induce breeding.

== Weather sensitivity ==
Misgurnus fossilis, the weatherfish, is a type of loach also in the Cobitidae family that is named after its ability to react and sense storms and rough weather. Kuhli loaches can also be sensitive to the weather conditions; they can sense sharp changes in atmospheric pressure (like an oncoming storm) and can be seen wriggling around near the surface of aquariums in response. It increases their activity level to exceptional heights even though they are a shy, bottom-dwelling, species in general.

== Conservation and status ==
According to the IUCN, kuhli loaches are of least concern. This means they are not in immediate danger of any impacts on their populations, but the population trends are currently unknown. There is currently no ongoing direct conservation of this species in their range.

Threats that could potentially lead to the decline of this species include agriculture and aquaculture encroachments, biological use, natural system changes, and pollution. Industrial palm plantations could contribute to the sedimentation of their natural habitat as well as increase bank erosion. With bank erosion comes the land degradation around the waters where kuhlis live, reducing the leaf litter they rely on to hide in and reducing shade, which can be critical in small pools. Shallow water heats up faster so without shade the kuhli loaches would be in danger of overheating since they tend to congregate in shallow pools of water. The palm industry, and agriculture in general, around their habitat could potentially pollute their waters with chemicals such as fertilizer and pesticides which reduces the overall water quality. Dams and water management in the area could reduce the size/integrity of their habitats as well, reduce their range, and thus reduce their populations which could lead to diseases spreading easily amidst the population. Reduction in suitable habitat and range can also degrade into a lack of genetic diversity, making it difficult for kuhli loaches to be resilient against diseases and further changes to their habitats.

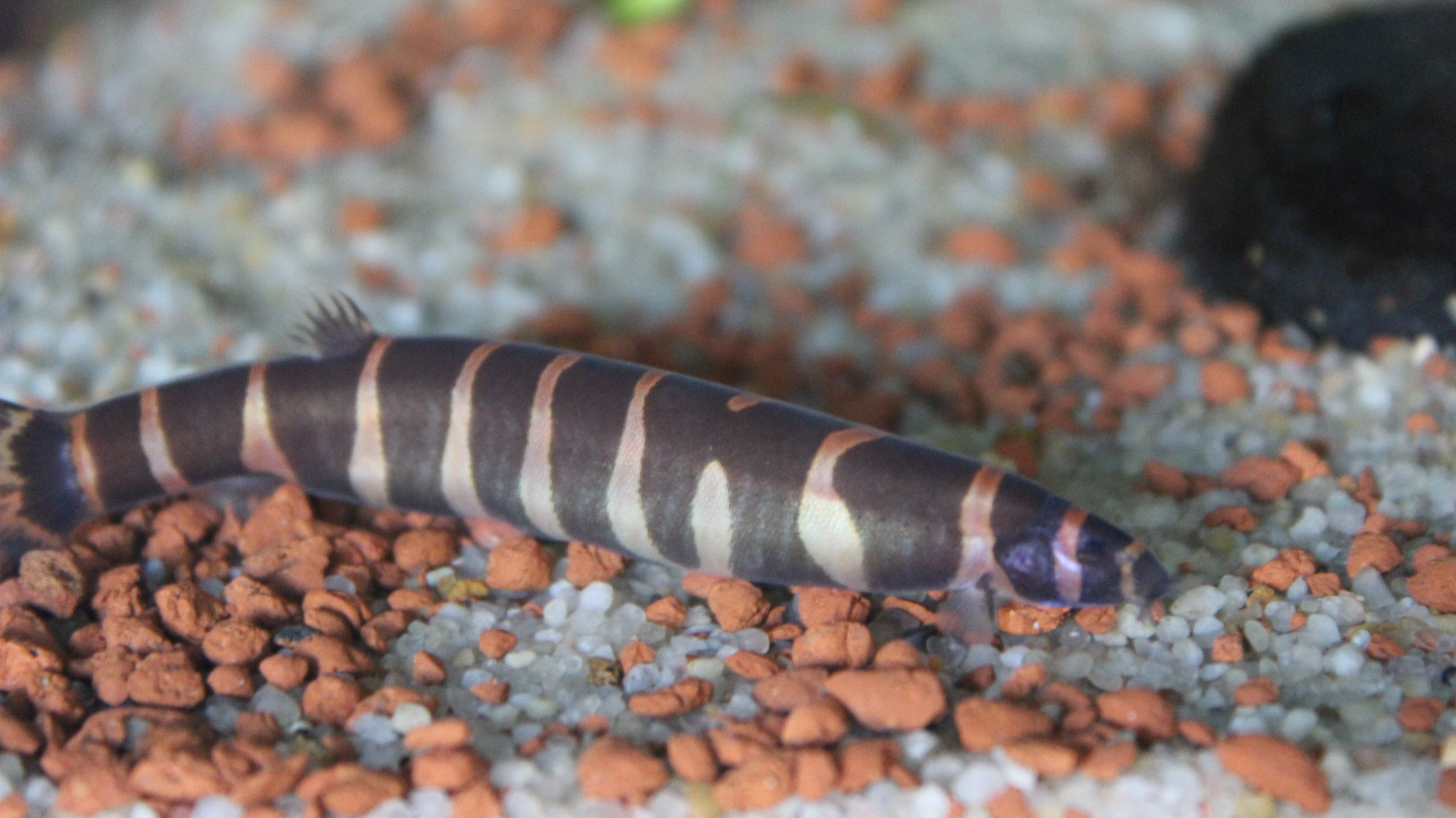
Kuhli loach in an aquarium, it is a close enough picture to clearly see its scale-less body.

The main concern for these fish is the overcollection of specimens to be sold in the market as they are highly valued ornamental fish and quite popular in aquariums. It has been reported that some numbers of loaches enter the country with varying diseases as well, such as Sphaerospora, Zschokkella, and Myxobolus. Myxozoan diseases can infect almost all parts of a fish including the gills, internal organs, and the skin. Bringing these diseases into different countries via the pet trade could potentially lead to outbreaks in aquaria.

== See also ==
- Java loach—Similar grayish black colored species
- List of freshwater aquarium fish species
