= Pangio apoda =

Scientific classification
- Kingdom: Animalia
- Phylum: Chordata
- Class: Actinopterygii
- Order: Cypriniformes
- Family: Cobitidae
- Genus: Pangio
- Species: P. apoda

Binomial name
- Pangio apoda Britz & Maclaine, 2007

Species of fish

Pangio apoda is a species of Cypriniformes fish in the genus Pangio.

== Footnotes ==
- Froese, Rainer; Pauly, Daniel (eds.). "Pangio apoda". FishBase.
