= Pangio longipinnis =

Scientific classification
- Kingdom: Animalia
- Phylum: Chordata
- Class: Actinopterygii
- Order: Cypriniformes
- Family: Cobitidae
- Genus: Pangio
- Species: P. longipinnis

Binomial name
- Pangio longipinnis (Menon, 1992)

Species of fish

Pangio longipinnis is a species of ray-finned fish in the genus Pangio.

This species is considered to be likely a synonym of Lepidocephalichthys berdmorei.
