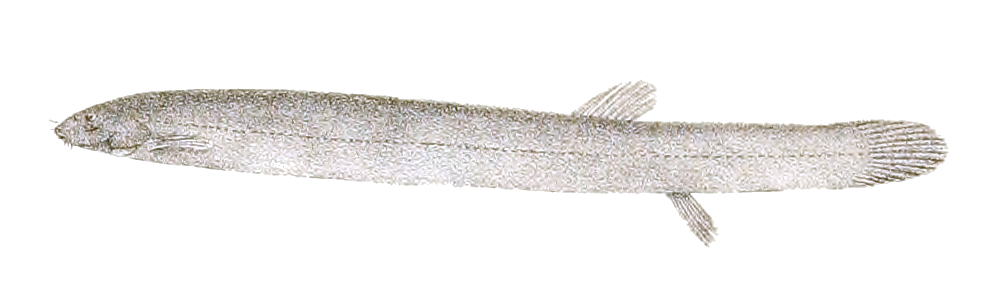

Scientific classification
- Domain: Eukaryota
- Kingdom: Animalia
- Phylum: Chordata
- Class: Actinopterygii
- Order: Cypriniformes
- Family: Cobitidae
- Genus: Pangio
- Species: P. fusca

Binomial name
- Pangio fusca (Blyth, 1860)

Synonyms
- Apua fusca

= Pangio fusca =

Species of fish

Pangio fusca is a species of ray-finned fish in the genus Pangio.

== Footnotes ==
- Froese, Rainer; Pauly, Daniel (eds.). "Pangio fusca". FishBase.
