= Pangio mariarum =

Scientific classification
- Domain: Eukaryota
- Kingdom: Animalia
- Phylum: Chordata
- Class: Actinopterygii
- Order: Cypriniformes
- Family: Cobitidae
- Genus: Pangio
- Species: P. mariarum

Binomial name
- Pangio mariarum (Inger & P. K. Chin, 1962)

Species of fish

Pangio mariarum is a species of ray-finned fish in the genus Pangio.

== Footnotes ==
- Froese, Rainer; Pauly, Daniel (eds.). "Pangio mariarum". FishBase.
