= Plunkett & Macleane =

- American theatrical release poster
- Directed by: Jake Scott
- Screenplay by: Neal Purvis Robert Wade; Charles McKeown
- Produced by: Tim Bevan; Eric Fellner; Rupert Harvey
- Starring: Robert Carlyle; Jonny Lee Miller; Liv Tyler; Ken Stott; Alan Cumming; Michael Gambon
- Cinematography: John Mathieson
- Edited by: Oral Norrie Ottey
- Music by: Craig Armstrong
- Production companies: The Arts Council of England; Working Title Films
- Distributed by: PolyGram Filmed Entertainment
- Release date: 2 April 1999
- Running time: 101 minutes
- Country: United Kingdom
- Language: English
- Budget: £8.4 million
- Box office: £3 million

Plunkett & Macleane is a 1999 British historical action comedy film directed by Jake Scott. It stars Robert Carlyle, Jonny Lee Miller and Liv Tyler. The film follows the story of Captain James Macleane (Miller) and Will Plunkett (Carlyle), two men in eighteenth century Britain who are both struggling to survive. The characters are loosely based on two genuine highwaymen of the eighteenth century, James MacLaine and William Plunkett, although the story bears little relation to their actual lives.

Plunkett & Macleane was released in the United Kingdom on 2 April 1999, by PolyGram Film Distribution. The film received generally negative reviews from critics.

== Plot ==
1748 England is infested with highwaymen — men such as Will Plunkett, a London-based criminal working with his partner Rob. When Rob is killed by the sadistic Thief Taker General Chance after a botched heist outside debtor's prison, Plunkett must find a way to retrieve a large ruby that his partner had swallowed. What he doesn't know is that the incident was witnessed by James Macleane, a socialite from the upper echelons of society, who had found himself in debtor's prison. Macleane sees the same ruby as his ticket out of debtors' prison and decides to steal it.

Plunkett ambushes Macleane and forces him to give up the ruby, but when Chance's men discover them, Plunkett swallows it. While in Newgate Prison, the two form a partnership that utilizes Plunkett's criminal know-how and Macleane's social status to bribe their way out of prison. This tentative partnership leads to an unlikely alliance, deemed "The Gentlemen Highwaymen," where they gladly relieve the gentry of their possessions. Soon enough, they are the most wanted men in England, much to the growing frustration of Chance.

When Macleane falls for the beautiful Lady Rebecca Gibson, the niece of the powerful Lord Gibson, the Lord Chief Justice, their plans to escape to British North America go awry. The pair part ways after a disastrous attempt to rescue Lady Rebecca from a forced marriage, which leads to Lord Gibson's death at the hands of Chance and the discovery that Macleane has recklessly gambled away all of their profits.

Macleane is eventually captured and tried for Lord Gibson's murder. He denies the charge of murder but confesses to cheating his fellow highwayman and expressing remorse, and is sentenced to death by hanging. As Macleane is brought to and hanged on the Tyburn gallows, Plunkett arrives at the last minute and rescues Macleane, aided by Lady Rebecca and the flamboyant Lord Rochester. After a tense chase through the London sewers that sees Plunkett killing Chance, avenging his old partner, the three escape to freedom.

== Cast ==
- Jonny Lee Miller as Captain James Macleane
- Robert Carlyle as Will Plunkett
- Liv Tyler as Lady Rebecca Gibson
- Ken Stott as Thief Taker General Chance
- Alan Cumming as Lord Rochester
- Michael Gambon as Lord Gibson
- Tommy Flanagan as Eddie
- David Walliams as Viscount Bilston
- Matt Lucas as Sir Oswald
- Ben Miller as Dixon
- Stephen Walters as Dennis
- Alexander Armstrong as Winterburn
- Noel Fielding as Brothel Gent
- Nicholas Farrell as M.P.'s Secretary
- Iain Robertson as Rob
- Claire Rushbrook as Lady Estelle
- Nichola McAuliffe as Lady Crombie
- Tom Ward as Backbench Heckler

== Release and reception ==
Plunkett & Macleane grossed £2,757,485 ($4.6 million) in the United Kingdom. It underperformed at the US box office. The film opened on 1 October 1999 in 475 U.S. theaters, taking in $244,765 during its first three days; total US earnings stand at $474,900.

The film received mainly negative reviews; Rotten Tomatoes lists a 24% rating based on reviews from 29 critics. Metacritic gives it a score of 44 out of 100 from 27 critics, indicating "mixed or average reviews".

Derek Elley of Variety wrote, "[T]he script and dialogue are nowhere near well-tooled enough, and the film's generally dark, cold look and baroque design play against the lighter touch required. Though he certainly puts the reported $15 million budget up on the screen, helmer Jake Scott (son of Ridley Scott) seems happiest when pushing ahead to his next montage sequence, each of which has the brio that should have informed the whole movie." Roger Ebert said, "Here is a film overgrown with so many directorial flourishes that the heroes need machetes to hack their way to within view of the audience."

Despite being panned by the critics, it was acclaimed by worldwide audiences and has gained a cult following.
