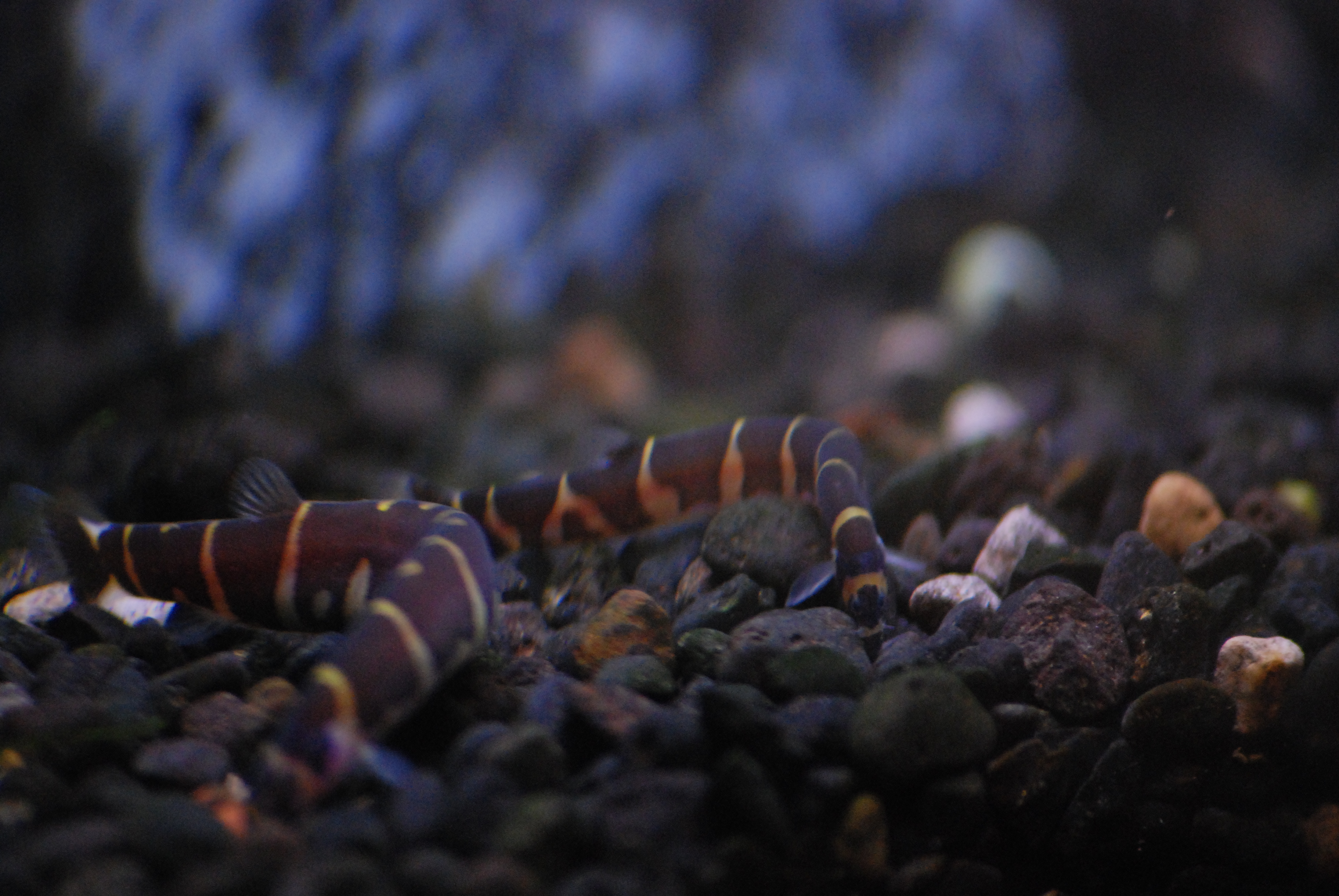
- Kuhli loaches in an aquarium

Conservation status
- Least Concern (IUCN 3.1)

Scientific classification
- Kingdom: Animalia
- Phylum: Chordata
- Class: Actinopterygii
- Order: Cypriniformes
- Family: Cobitidae
- Genus: Pangio
- Species: P. myersi

Binomial name
- Pangio myersi (Harry, 1949)

= Pangio myersi =

Species of fish

Pangio myersi (Myer's loach, Myer's kuhli loach or giant kuhli) is a species of loach in the genus Pangio native to Laos, Cambodia, Viet Nam and Thailand. They are black with orange bands, and can grow to 10 centimetres (3.9 in) SL.

In its native range, the giant kuhli likes to swarm under leaves and underwater plants. Although it is not a schooling fish, it does prefer to be with others of its kind.

== Aquarium keeping ==
This species is a peaceful aquarium fish that recently have become hard to find for hobbyists in the US. Because of their similar names, and probably because the giant kuhli loach has become scarce in recent years, it is often confused with the "regular" kuhli loach, Pangio semicincta.

The giant kuhli loach is an omnivore, but apparently needs a lot of protein, since it especially loves to eat live bloodworms and other live worms. It is also fond of shrimp pellets and algae wafers. However, it will eat flake food or anything else it finds that has drifted to the bottom of the tank.

This colorful and peaceful bottom-dweller does not attack other fish. The giant kuhli tends to meander toward their food. In the aquarium they should be kept in groups of at least six.

Like many loaches, giant kuhlis live about ten years in good conditions. They are less picky about water quality than most tropical fish, and thus make good beginner's fish.
