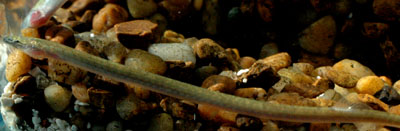

Scientific classification
- Domain: Eukaryota
- Kingdom: Animalia
- Phylum: Chordata
- Class: Actinopterygii
- Order: Cypriniformes
- Family: Cobitidae
- Genus: Pangio
- Species: P. doriae

Binomial name
- Pangio doriae (Perugia, 1892)

= Pangio doriae =

Species of fish

Pangio doriae is a species of ray-finned fish in the genus Pangio.

== Footnotes ==
- Froese, Rainer; Pauly, Daniel (eds.). "Pangio doriae". FishBase.
