= Pangio lidi =

Conservation status
- Data Deficient (IUCN 3.1)

Scientific classification
- Kingdom: Animalia
- Phylum: Chordata
- Class: Actinopterygii
- Order: Cypriniformes
- Family: Cobitidae
- Genus: Pangio
- Species: P. lidi

Binomial name
- Pangio lidi Hadiaty & Kottelat, 2009

Species of fish

Pangio lidi is a species of ray-finned fish in the genus Pangio. The species name lidi was given after the Indonesian word for the rachis of coconut leaves in reference to the slender body of the fish. It is only known to inhabit Sungai Petung Kanan of the Mahakam River, East Kalimantan, Indonesia from the type locality. It is known to live inhabit tropical rivers with shallow demersal environments, with the species being collected from an area with slow currents under large trees and leaf litter. Colorations are green-brown to bronze with white to pinkish bellies. It has been assessed as 'Data deficient' by the IUCN Red List in 2019 due to there being little information on the species population, range, and potential impact from threats. One potential threat that is likely affecting the species is monoculture plantations of oil palm farms degrading their habitats due to increased water usage and pollution from pesticides and sedimentation.

== Footnotes & References ==
- Froese, Rainer; Pauly, Daniel (eds.). "Pangio lidi". FishBase.
