= Tiger goby =

Conservation status
- Data Deficient (IUCN 3.1)

Scientific classification
- Kingdom: Animalia
- Phylum: Chordata
- Class: Actinopterygii
- Order: Gobiiformes
- Family: Oxudercidae
- Genus: Pseudogobiopsis
- Species: P. tigrellus

Binomial name
- Pseudogobiopsis tigrellus (Nichols, 1951)

Synonyms
- Gobius tigrellus Nichols, 1951; Ctenogobius tigrellus (Nichols, 1951)

Species of fish

Pseudogobiopsis tigrellus, the Tiger goby, is a species of goby endemic to Indonesia where it is only known from the Mamberamo River, Irian Jaya, Indonesia. This species can reach a length of 2.3 centimetres (0.91 in) SL.
