= Indian coolie-loach =

Scientific classification
- Domain: Eukaryota
- Kingdom: Animalia
- Phylum: Chordata
- Class: Actinopterygii
- Order: Cypriniformes
- Family: Cobitidae
- Genus: Pangio
- Species: P. goaensis

Binomial name
- Pangio goaensis (Tilak, 1972)

Species of fish

Indian coolie-loach (Pangio goaensis) is a species of ray-finned fish in the genus Pangio.

== Footnotes ==
- Froese, Rainer; Pauly, Daniel (eds.). "Pangio goaensis". FishBase.
