= Pangio agma =

Scientific classification
- Domain: Eukaryota
- Kingdom: Animalia
- Phylum: Chordata
- Class: Actinopterygii
- Order: Cypriniformes
- Family: Cobitidae
- Genus: Pangio
- Species: P. agma

Binomial name
- Pangio agma (M. E. Burridge, 1992)

Synonyms
- Acanthophthalmus agmus Burridge, 1992

Species of fish

Pangio agma is a species of ray-finned fish in the genus Pangio. It is endemic to Borneo where it is found in northern Sarawak and Brunei. It grows to 6.3 cm (2.5 in) SL.
