= Pangio alternans =

Scientific classification
- Kingdom: Animalia
- Phylum: Chordata
- Class: Actinopterygii
- Order: Cypriniformes
- Family: Cobitidae
- Genus: Pangio
- Species: P. alternans

Binomial name
- Pangio alternans Kottelat & K. K. P. Lim, 1993

Species of fish

Pangio alternans is a species of ray-finned fish in the genus Pangio.
