= Pangio filinaris =

Conservation status
- Least Concern (IUCN 3.1)

Scientific classification
- Kingdom: Animalia
- Phylum: Chordata
- Class: Actinopterygii
- Order: Cypriniformes
- Family: Cobitidae
- Genus: Pangio
- Species: P. filinaris

Binomial name
- Pangio filinaris Kottelat & K. K. P. Lim, 1993

Species of fish

Pangio filinaris is a species of ray-finned fish in the genus Pangio.
