= Pangio robiginosa =

Scientific classification
- Domain: Eukaryota
- Kingdom: Animalia
- Phylum: Chordata
- Class: Actinopterygii
- Order: Cypriniformes
- Family: Cobitidae
- Genus: Pangio
- Species: P. robiginosa

Binomial name
- Pangio robiginosa (Raut, 1957)

Species of fish

Pangio robiginosa is a species of ray-finned fish in the genus Pangio.

== Footnotes ==
- Froese, Rainer; Pauly, Daniel (eds.). "Pangio robiginosa". FishBase.
