= Borneo loach =

Scientific classification
- Kingdom: Animalia
- Phylum: Chordata
- Class: Actinopterygii
- Order: Cypriniformes
- Family: Cobitidae
- Genus: Pangio
- Species: P. shelfordii

Binomial name
- Pangio shelfordii (Popta, 1903)

Synonyms
- Acanthophthalmus shelfordii Popta, 1903

Species of fish

The Borneo loach (Pangio shelfordii) is a Southeast Asian species of cobitid fish. It is a river fish found on the Malay Peninsula, Sumatra and Borneo.
