= Pseudogobiopsis festivus =

Conservation status
- Near Threatened (IUCN 3.1)

Scientific classification
- Kingdom: Animalia
- Phylum: Chordata
- Class: Actinopterygii
- Order: Gobiiformes
- Family: Oxudercidae
- Genus: Pseudogobiopsis
- Species: P. festivus

Binomial name
- Pseudogobiopsis festivus Larson, 2009

Species of fish

Pseudogobiopsis festivus is a species of goby endemic to Malaysia where it is only known from the rainforest freshwater streams of Sarawak.
