= Pangio pulla =

Scientific classification
- Kingdom: Animalia
- Phylum: Chordata
- Class: Actinopterygii
- Order: Cypriniformes
- Family: Cobitidae
- Genus: Pangio
- Species: P. pulla

Binomial name
- Pangio pulla Kottelat & K. K. P. Lim, 1993

Species of fish

Pangio pulla is a species of ray-finned fish in the genus Pangio.

== Footnotes ==
- Froese, Rainer; Pauly, Daniel (eds.). "Pangio pulla". FishBase.
