= Pseudogobiopsis oligactis =

Conservation status
- Least Concern (IUCN 3.1)

Scientific classification
- Kingdom: Animalia
- Phylum: Chordata
- Class: Actinopterygii
- Order: Gobiiformes
- Family: Oxudercidae
- Genus: Pseudogobiopsis
- Species: P. oligactis

Binomial name
- Pseudogobiopsis oligactis (Bleeker, 1875)

Synonyms
- Gobiopsis oligactis Bleeker, 1875; Eugnathogobius oligactis (Bleeker, 1875); Pseudogobius oligactis (Bleeker, 1875); Stigmatogobius oligactis (Bleeker, 1875); Glossogobius campbellianus Jordan & Seale, 1907; Pseudogobiopsis campbellianus (Jordan & Seale, 1907); Glossogobius mas Hora, 1923; Pseudogobius neglectus Bleeker, 1931; Stigmatogobius neglectus Koumans, 1932; Pseudogobiopsis neglectus (Koumans, 1932); Vaimosa perakensis Herre, 1940; Mugilogobius perakensis (Herre, 1940)

Species of fish

Pseudogobiopsis oligactis, the bigmouth stream goby, is a species of goby from the subfamily Gobionellinae of the family Oxudercidae which is widespread in southern Asia.

== Description ==
Pseudogobiopsis oligactis is a species which has a relatively slender, cylindrical body with two dorsal fins, a rounded tail and which has the pelvic fins fused into a disc. There is a count of 22–25 scales in the lateral line. The scales on the upper part of body have narrow blackish margins and the flanks are marked with five elongated dark brown blotches along their middle with five black spots underneath them. There are three blackish streaks on the sides of the face. The caudal fin and the second dorsal fin have fine brownish bars. The mature males develop a depressed head and enlarged jaws. The first spine in the first dorsal fin is the longest and normally develops into a filament. It attains maximum size of 46 millimetres (1.8 in) in standard length.

== Distribution ==
Pseudogobiopsis oligactis is widely distributed throughout the coastal areas of South and Southeast Asia; from Maharashtra and Karnataka in India and Bangladesh to Thailand, coastal Cambodia, Malaysia, Brunei, Java, Sumatra and Kalimantan. It was thought to extirpated from Singapore but has been rediscovered in that country.

== Habitat and biology ==
Pseudogobiopsis oligactis is found in brackish and fresh water in estuaries and the lower reaches of rivers, including in adjacent streams. It apparently prefers exposed and sunlit streams which are clean with a current running over sandy or clay beds. In Singapore it was common in the Central Catchment Nature Reserve reservoirs and in streams running through open-country streams while in Peninsular Malaysia they have been found in fast flowing, hill streams which flow into Lake Chenderoh but they could also be found in large numbers along the shores of the lake, where there were submerged trees and stumps, in grassy bays, and in shallow inlets where the lake bed is covered in leaf litter.

Pseudogobiopsis oligactis is able to complete its life cycle in freshwater and is known to have flourished in land-locked conditions since the early 1920s in reservoirs and in their tributary rocky hill streams. In other circumstances these fish can spend part of their life cycle in the sea. It feeds on smaller fish and invertebrates.
