= Pangio piperata =

Scientific classification
- Kingdom: Animalia
- Phylum: Chordata
- Class: Actinopterygii
- Order: Cypriniformes
- Family: Cobitidae
- Genus: Pangio
- Species: P. piperata

Binomial name
- Pangio piperata Kottelat & K. K. P. Lim, 1993

Species of fish

Pangio piperata is a species of ray-finned fish in the genus Pangio.

== Footnotes ==
- Froese, Rainer; Pauly, Daniel (eds.). "Pangio piperata". FishBase.
