= Pangio anguillaris =

Scientific classification
- Kingdom: Animalia
- Phylum: Chordata
- Class: Actinopterygii
- Order: Cypriniformes
- Family: Cobitidae
- Genus: Pangio
- Species: P. anguillaris

Binomial name
- Pangio anguillaris (Vaillant, 1902)

Synonyms
- Acantophthalmus anguillaris Vaillant, 1902; Cobitophis anguillaris (Vaillant, 1902); Acanthophthalmus vermicularis Weber & de Beaufort, 1916; Cobitophis perakensis Herre, 1940

Species of fish

Pangio anguillaris is a species of loach found in still and slow-moving freshwater in Indochina (Mekong and Chao Phraya basins), Malay Peninsula, Sumatra, and Borneo.

This is a slender fish (the specific name means "eel-like") measuring up to 12 cm standard length. It is generally brown, sometimes with tiny spots, with a faint dark lateral stripe down the body. It is a rather slow-moving species, often burying itself in the mud or sand. It is often found in temporary waters such as seasonally flooded fields. It is not caught in large numbers although it is considered a delicacy in parts of Thailand and small numbers end up in the aquarium trade.
