= Pseudogobiopsis lumbantobing =

Scientific classification
- Kingdom: Animalia
- Phylum: Chordata
- Class: Actinopterygii
- Order: Gobiiformes
- Family: Oxudercidae
- Genus: Pseudogobiopsis
- Species: P. lumbantobing

Binomial name
- Pseudogobiopsis lumbantobing Larson, Hadiaty and Hubert, 2017

Species of fish

Pseudogobiopsis lumbantobing is a species of goby from the subfamily Gobionellinae which is found in Java and Sumatra where it occurs in freshwater rivers and streams at altitudes of 5–22 metres (16–72 ft), with substrates made up of sand, gravel, rock, and boulders and where there may be growths of algae and aquatic macrophytes. This species has been traded in the European aquarium trade since 2001.

== Etymology ==
The specific name honours the ichthyologist Daniel Lumbantobing of the Florida Museum of Natural History who showed the first specimens which he had collected to Helen K. Larson in 2012, this resolved the identity of the orange-spotted gobies which had been recorded in the European aquarium trade and which aquarists had sent pictures to Larson for identification.
