= William Plunkett (highwayman) =

- Born: Unknown
- Died: 1791; Plunketts Creek, Lycoming County, Pennsylvania?
- Occupations: Apothecary, colonial/state militia officer, highwayman
- Known for: He and James MacLaine were notorious highwaymen around London.

William Plunkett (died 1791) was a highwayman and accomplice of the famed "Gentleman Highwayman", James MacLaine.

== Life of crime ==
Plunkett lived during the mid-eighteenth century in London, on Jermyn Street, and was said to have been an apothecary who was also presumed to be a gentleman. With stolen pistols and horses, and their faces hidden by Venetian masks, Plunkett and MacLaine had a short but highly successful career as outlaws. While MacLaine was eventually hanged for his exploits, Plunkett escaped with both his illicit gains and his life.

William Plunkett was portrayed by the actor Robert Carlyle in a fictionalised account of the highwaymen, the 1999 film Plunkett & Macleane.

== MacLaine's testimony of Plunkett ==
According to the records of MacLaine's trial, and his testimony, Plunkett was impoverished and led MacLaine into the life of highway robbery. While MacLaine was still applying himself to trade he met Plunkett, who spoke to him of his travels abroad, and had fine clothes to match his story, and induced MacLaine to lend him a hundred pounds. After making sundry repayments (claimed MacLaine), Plunkett offered to repay him partly in goods, and gave him some clothes which were afterwards identified as having been stolen in one of the Hounslow Heath mounted robberies. Plunkett is supposed to have encouraged MacLaine by telling him that they had a right to live, but that the means were not available to them unless they overcame a few scruples and took from the improvident wealthy. MacLaine sought to turn evidence against Plunkett, but was refused an agreement. (Such was MacLaine's defence.)

== Contemporary observations ==
On one occasion, when taking clothes belonging to a priest (who objected), Plunkett replied that they stole because necessity obliged them to do so, not from wantonness: and on another, he put aside his pistol while robbing a lady because he saw she was alarmed by it. It is said of Plunkett that 'he loved his bottle and a woman.'

== Reputed immigration to America ==
Plunkett was not tried or sentenced in connection with the robberies.

In 1845, Charles Miner reported the claim that the Colonel William Plunket who commanded one of the two earliest battalions of the Northumberland Militia in Lycoming County, Pennsylvania, in 1775 was the same person as MacLaine's former accomplice. Miner quotes from The Gentleman's Magazine for September 1750 to summarise the association of Plunkett with MacLaine in the attack on Lord Eglintoun on Hounslow Heath.

Miner then adds a transcript of a manuscript note found (before 1845) in a bound copy of The Gentleman's Magazine in the Athenaeum Library in London, at this point in the text, stating that Plunkett became a magistrate in Pennsylvania, that he acknowledged he had been the associate of MacLaine, and that persons in America who had known Plunkett in England had recognised him.

Plunketts Creek in Lycoming County bears the name of Col. William Plunkett. He reputedly died aged around 100 at Sunbury (Pennsylvania), quite blind, and was buried there in 1791. But if this is true, and if he were the same man, he must already have been 60 at the time of the highway robberies on Hounslow Heath, and almost 85 when commanding the Northumberland Militia. The facts can be reconciled if the estimate of his age at death is exaggerated.
