= Pseudogobiopsis =

Scientific classification
- Kingdom: Animalia
- Phylum: Chordata
- Class: Actinopterygii
- Order: Gobiiformes
- Family: Oxudercidae
- Subfamily: Gobionellinae
- Genus: Pseudogobiopsis; Koumans, 1935

Type species
- Gobiopsis oligactis Bleeker, 1875

Genus of fishes

Pseudogobiopsis is a genus of fish in the goby family, Gobiidae. They are native to fresh and brackish waters of southern and southeastern Asia. The genus is mainly distinguished by the number and arrangement of fin rays and spines, headpores, and sensory papillae, the large mouths of the males, a fleshy or bony flange on the pectoral girdle, and the shape of the genital papilla.

== Species ==
There are currently five recognized species in this genus:

- Pseudogobiopsis festivus Larson, 2009
- Pseudogobiopsis lumbantobing Larson, Hadiaty & Hubert, 2017
- Pseudogobiopsis oligactis (Bleeker, 1875) – bigmouth stream goby
- Pseudogobiopsis paludosus (Herre, 1940)
- Pseudogobiopsus rubrimaculosa G. R. Allen & Larson, 2020
- Pseudogobiopsis tigrellus (Nichols, 1951) – tiger goby
