= Pangio atactos =

Conservation status
- Vulnerable (IUCN 3.1)

Scientific classification
- Kingdom: Animalia
- Phylum: Chordata
- Class: Actinopterygii
- Order: Cypriniformes
- Family: Cobitidae
- Genus: Pangio
- Species: P. atactos

Binomial name
- Pangio atactos H. H. Tan & Kottelat, 2009

Species of fish

Pangio atactos is a species of cyprinid fish. It is endemic to Sumatra (Indonesia) and only known from the upper reaches of the Batang Hari River basin. It is a demersal species that occurs in both rivers and lakes.

Pangio atactos grows to 5.1 cm (2.0 in) standard length.
