= Nemacheilus selangoricus =

Conservation status
- Least Concern (IUCN 3.1)

Scientific classification
- Kingdom: Animalia
- Phylum: Chordata
- Class: Actinopterygii
- Order: Cypriniformes
- Family: Nemacheilidae
- Genus: Nemacheilus
- Species: N. selangoricus

Binomial name
- Nemacheilus selangoricus Duncker, 1904

Species of fish

Nemacheilus selangoricus is a species of ray-finned fish in the genus Nemacheilus. This species can be found in fast flowing forest streams with acidic water and sand-gravel substrate It occurs in the Indonesian islands of Sumatra, Bangka and Belitung as well as in the Malay Peninsula from Singapore north to Trang and Songkhla in Thailand. It is collected for the aquarium trade.
