= Pangio bitaimac =

Conservation status
- Data Deficient (IUCN 3.1)

Scientific classification
- Kingdom: Animalia
- Phylum: Chordata
- Class: Actinopterygii
- Order: Cypriniformes
- Family: Cobitidae
- Genus: Pangio
- Species: P. bitaimac

Binomial name
- Pangio bitaimac H. H. Tan & Kottelat, 2009

Species of fish

Pangio bitaimac is a species of cyprinid fish. It is endemic to Sumatera (Indonesia) and only known from the Batang Hari River basin. It occurs in small tributary freshwater streams.

Pangio bitaimac grows to 9.5 cm (3.7 in) standard length.
