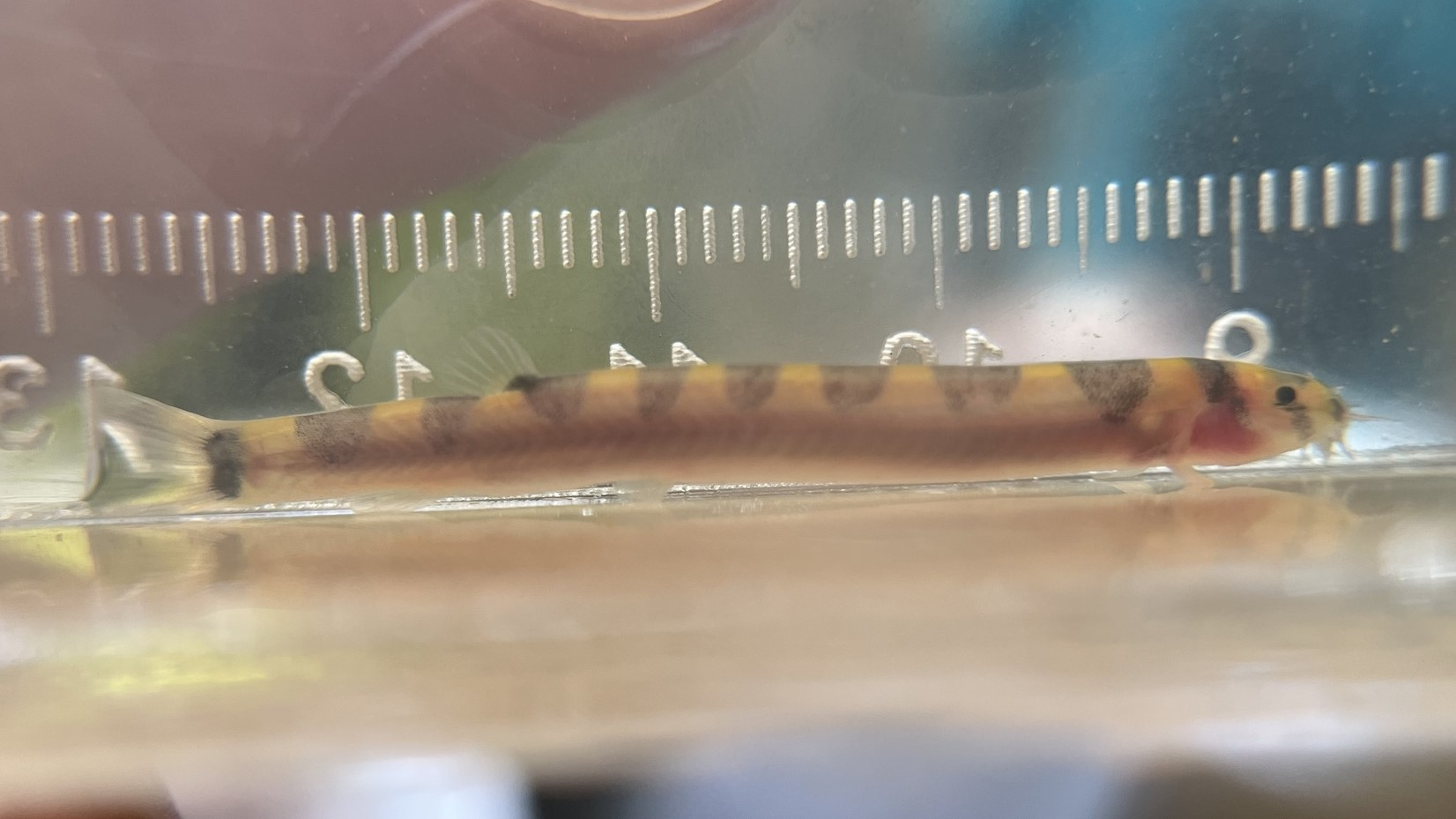

Scientific classification
- Kingdom: Animalia
- Phylum: Chordata
- Class: Actinopterygii
- Order: Cypriniformes
- Family: Cobitidae
- Genus: Pangio
- Species: P. malayana

Binomial name
- Pangio malayana (Tweedie, 1956)

= Pangio malayana =

Species of fish

Pangio malayana is a species of ray-finned fish in the family Cobitidae. It is found in rivers in Malaysia and Indonesia.

== Footnotes ==
- Froese, Rainer; Pauly, Daniel (eds.). "Pangio malayana". FishBase.
