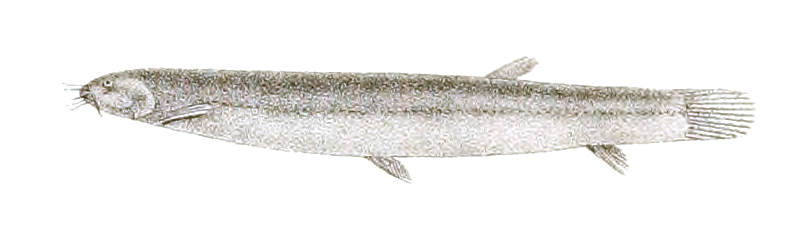

Scientific classification
- Kingdom: Animalia
- Phylum: Chordata
- Class: Actinopterygii
- Order: Cypriniformes
- Family: Cobitidae
- Genus: Pangio
- Species: P. pangia

Binomial name
- Pangio pangia (F. Hamilton, 1822)

Synonyms
- Canthophrys rubiginosus Swainson 1839; Pangia cinnamomea (McClelland, 1839); Cobitis cinnamomea McClelland 1839; Apua fusca (non Blyth, 1860); Acanthophthalmus pangia (Hamilton, 1822); Cobitis pangia Hamilton, 1822

= Pangio pangia =

Species of fish

Pangio pangia is a species of ray-finned fish in the genus Pangio, of which it is the type species. It is found in India, Bangladesh, Nepal and Myanmar.
