= Pangio cuneovirgata =

Scientific classification
- Domain: Eukaryota
- Kingdom: Animalia
- Phylum: Chordata
- Class: Actinopterygii
- Order: Cypriniformes
- Family: Cobitidae
- Genus: Pangio
- Species: P. cuneovirgata

Binomial name
- Pangio cuneovirgata (Raut, 1957)

Species of fish

Pangio cuneovirgata is a species of ray-finned fish in the genus Pangio.

== Footnotes ==
- Froese, Rainer; Pauly, Daniel (eds.). "Pangio cuneovirgata". FishBase.
