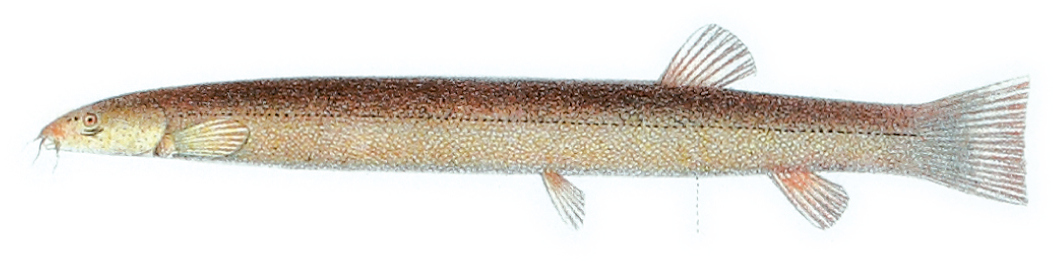

Scientific classification
- Kingdom: Animalia
- Phylum: Chordata
- Class: Actinopterygii
- Order: Cypriniformes
- Family: Cobitidae
- Genus: Pangio
- Species: P. oblonga

Binomial name
- Pangio oblonga (Valenciennes in Cuvier & Valenciennes, 1846)

Synonyms
- Acanthopthalmus javanicus Pangio javanicus

= Java loach =

Species of fish

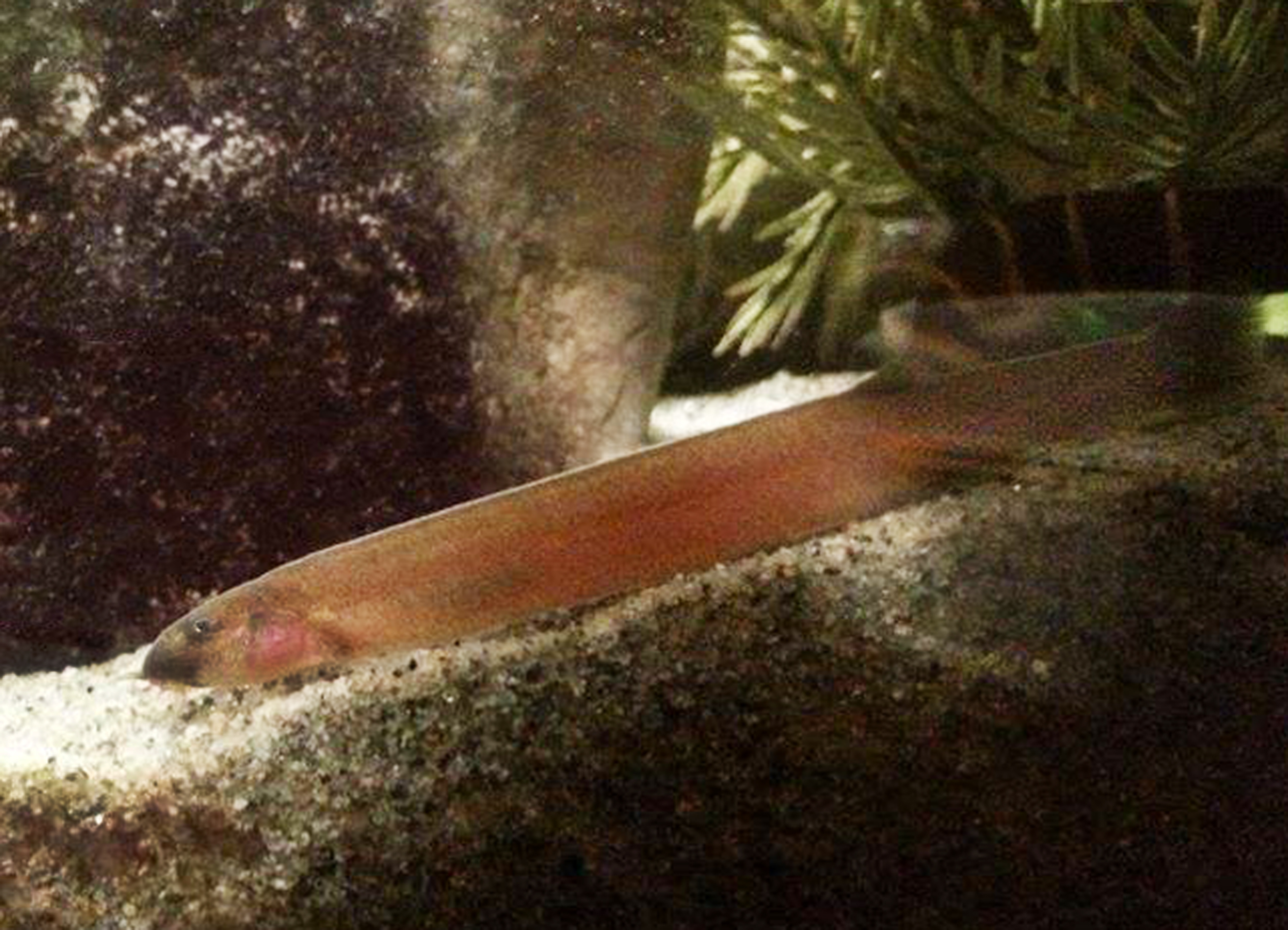
Java loach in an aquarium

The Java loach (Pangio oblonga) is a species of tropical freshwater fish, an unbanded kuhli loach, native to the sandy streams of Southeast Asia. Its alternative common names include the black kuhli loach, chocolate kuhli loach and cinnamon loach. It is common in the aquarium trade.

== Description and behavior ==
The java loach, like its fellow Pangio species, has a long eel-like body with small eyes set high in the skull. Its rayed dorsal fin is set far back on the dorsal side, halfway between the tail and middle of the fish. The tail ends with a flat edge and may be slightly forked in the middle.

Due to the large range of the java loach, coloration varies between populations. Individuals carry a solid color of red-brown to chocolate brown to near black on their dorsal side, while the ventral side is pale by contrast.

Java loaches grow to 3 inches (8 cm) and readily scavenge bits of food from soft substrate. They will accept flake food in aquaria but prefer a meaty diet of Mysis shrimp, brine shrimp, bloodworms, etc. They are a social species best kept in large groups of five or more. The species darts into the substrate when it feels threatened. Sexual dimorphism is not readily apparent, although females carrying eggs will appear fatter.

Like many other loach species, they are known to not breed often in captivity without certain hormones. There is a recording of breeding this species in home aquaria, however.

== Distribution ==
- The Mekong River basin of Laos, Cambodia, Thailand and Vietnam
- Chao Phraya River Basin and Nan River, Thailand
- Seroke Stream and Darjiling River, India
- Dangtong River, Cambodia
- Sungai Pinoh River, Borneo
- Brang and Tersat Rivers, Malaysia
- Mandalay and Tenasserim Divisions, Myanmar (Burma)

== Habitat ==
P. oblonga, like most loaches, lives in streambeds. In the wild and in optimal aquarium conditions, the water pH is from 6.2 to 7.0 and the temperature ranges from 76° to 82 °F, or 24° to 28 °C.

== See also ==
- Kuhli loach Comparable striped species.
