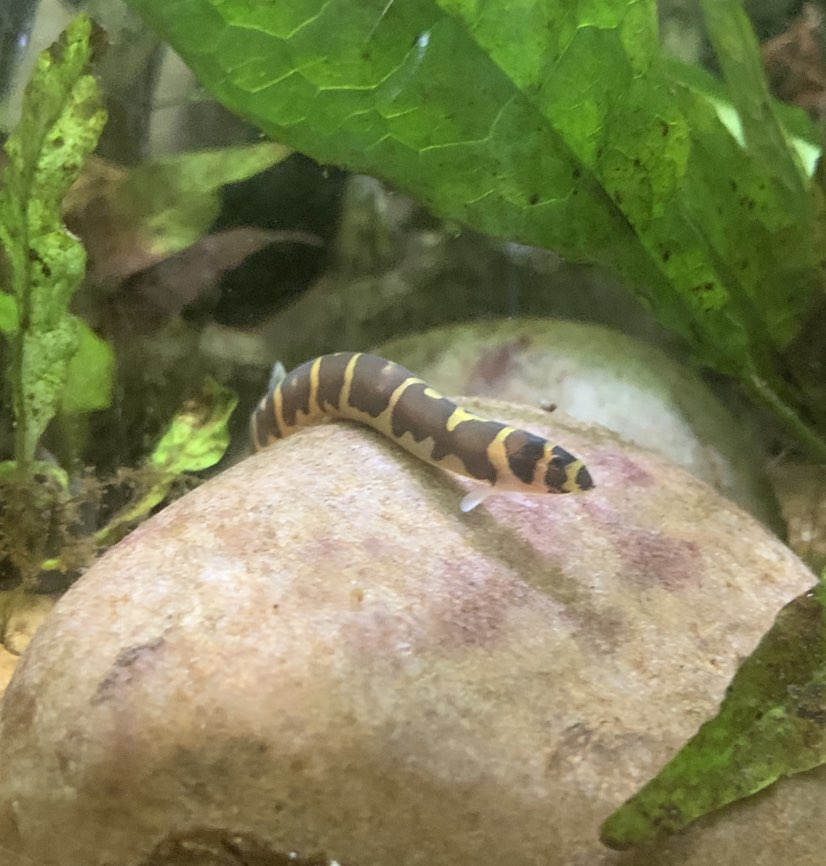

Conservation status
- Least Concern (IUCN 3.1)

Scientific classification
- Kingdom: Animalia
- Phylum: Chordata
- Class: Actinopterygii
- Order: Cypriniformes
- Family: Cobitidae
- Genus: Pangio
- Species: P. semicincta

Binomial name
- Pangio semicincta (Fraser-Brunner, 1940)

Synonyms
- Acanthophthalmus semicinctus Fraser-Brunner, 1940

= Pangio semicincta =

Species of fish

Pangio semicincta, the half-banded kuhli loach, is a species of cobitid loach in the genus Pangio found in the Malay Peninsula, Borneo, and Sumatra. It is a very popular fish in the aquarium trade, however, it is often confused for and mislabeled as Pangio kuhlii, a slightly larger-bodied fish, which is rarely (if ever) found in the aquarium trade due to it being endemic to Java, Indonesia, where field-collection for the fish trade is a rare occurrence.

== Description ==
Pangio semicincta, much like related taxa, is a long, eel-like fish, usually reaching 10 cm in length at maximum. Its body has nine to twelve uneven dark brown bands, with yellow in between them, and a pale white underside. Adult females are often slightly larger and heavier bodied than males, and in males the first pectoral fin ray is thickened.

== Distribution and habitat ==
Pangio semicincta is found in the Malay Peninsula, Borneo, and Sumatra. It is most often found in calm, shallow, tannin heavy blackwater areas, such as streams, swamps, and oxbow lakes. These habitats are often shaded and have low pH, due to the release of tannins from decaying plant material. The substrate in these habitats is often sand or mud.

== Behavior and diet ==
Pangio species forage in the substrate and sift mouthfuls of sand through the gills to feed on insect larvae, small crustaceans, and other small animals. Pangio are social fish, living in large aggregations in the wild, and in home aquaria are often observed staying together, often packing themselves into the same cave or crevice. Pangio are peaceful fish, and are not known to attack conspecifics or fish of other species.

== Footnotes ==
- Froese, Rainer; Pauly, Daniel (eds.). "Pangio semicincta". FishBase.
