= James MacLaine =

British highwayman

James Maclaine
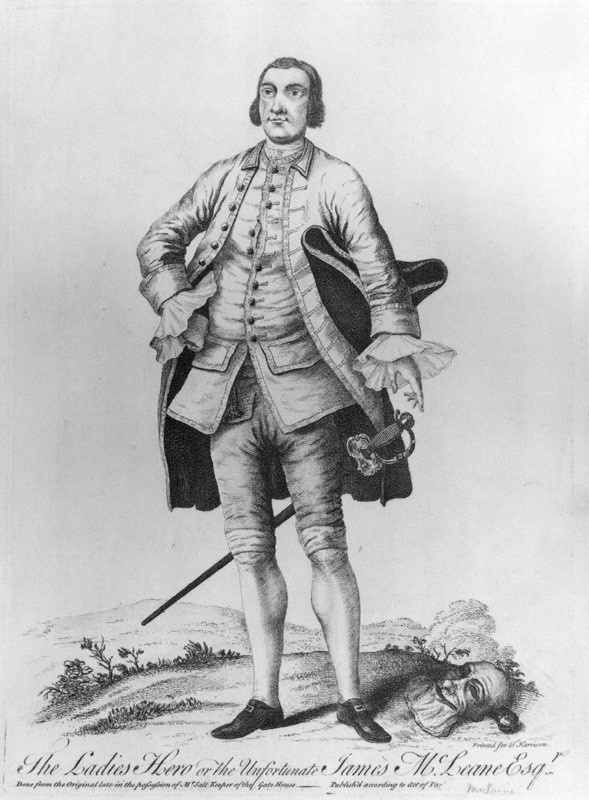
- Born: 1724; County Monaghan, Ireland?
- Died: 3 October 1750 (aged 25–26); Tyburn Tree Gallows, Middlesex, London, England
- Occupations: grocer, merchant, chandler, highwayman

"Captain" James Maclaine (occasionally "Maclean", "MacLean", or "Maclane") (1724 – 3 October 1750) was an Irish man of a respectable presbyterian family who had a brief but notorious career as a mounted highwayman in London with his accomplice William Plunkett. He was known as "The Gentleman Highwayman" as a result of his courteous behaviour during his robberies, and obtained a certain kind of celebrity. Notoriously, he held up and robbed Horace Walpole at gunpoint: eventually he was hanged at Tyburn.

The film Plunkett & Macleane was based loosely on his exploits.

== Young life ==
Maclaine was the younger of two sons of a Scots-Irish presbyterian minister, the Revd. Thomas (?or Lauchlin) Maclaine of 1st Monaghan Presbyterian Church in Ireland. His mother, Elizabeth (née Milling) died when he was five or six years old, and his father when he was sixteen or seventeen. He came of a family of many ministers, his grandfather (a Gaelic-speaking clergyman in the Church of Scotland) having received a calling to Ireland from Argyllshire in 1698. His elder brother Archibald Maclaine (1722–1804) was educated in Glasgow and followed his own vocation as presbyterian minister, scholar and royal preceptor in the Netherlands between 1746 and 1796, famous as the first translator (1765) of Johann Lorenz von Mosheim's Ecclesiastical History (of 1726).

Educated to become a merchant, James Maclaine frittered away his inheritance in Dublin on fine clothes, gambling and prostitutes. Such inheritance as James received had mostly been dissipated by the time he was 20, and his mother's relations soon quarreled with him and refused to give him any assistance. He attached himself to the domestic service of a Mr Howard in order to travel to England, and stayed with him for a while, but got into low company and, leaving without testimonials, returned to Ireland. His mother's kin still refusing to help, his brother sent him subsidies and letters of good advice from The Hague: these proving insufficient, he considered joining the Irish Brigade in the French army, but was told that he would make little progress with them unless he became a Roman Catholic, which he was unwilling to do.

He next persuaded his old master, Colonel T-----n, to take him to England as a domestic servant, planning to acquire his fortune through an advantageous marriage. He borrowed money from the Colonel to purchase a commission, but that went the same way, and he considered enlisting in Lord Albemarle's horse troops. He disgraced himself by having an affair with an officer's wife. His friends in London raised a small subscription to enable him to ship for Jamaica, but he took the money to the Masquerades (i.e. the public gardens) and squandered it at the gaming tables. At length he found himself a wife, the daughter of an innkeeper or horse-dealer in Oxford Road, London, whom he married in about 1746.

With the dowry of five hundred pounds Maclaine set himself up as a grocer in Welbeck Street, Cavendish Square. This was no great success, however, as he did not apply himself very much, though his neighbours could not afterwards point to any real misdemeanour in his behaviour at that time. Two daughters were born to them, one of whom survived, but his wife died within three years. His mother-in-law, who had a good opinion of Maclaine, took charge of the surviving daughter. It was during his wife's illness that he met William Plunkett, an apothecary, who attended her. His business failing, owing (by his own account) to "an unavoidable trust reposed in servants", he sold off his stock and with whatever remained he turned his mind again to a military career.

However, in passing himself off as a young gentleman in search of another wealthy wife, he had neither the funds nor the habitude necessary to rise above the accompanying inducements to profligacy. Plunkett is said to have acted the part of gentleman's assistant as Maclaine, immaculately presented, paid court to a young lady worth more than £10,000 a year; but on one occasion when they had followed her to a spa, Maclaine had an argument with an apothecary in the public rooms. This person employed a military man to kick Maclaine down the stairs, while stating publicly that he knew Maclaine had been a footman only a few years previously. Plunkett and Maclaine were obliged to make a hasty and informal departure.

== Highwayman ==
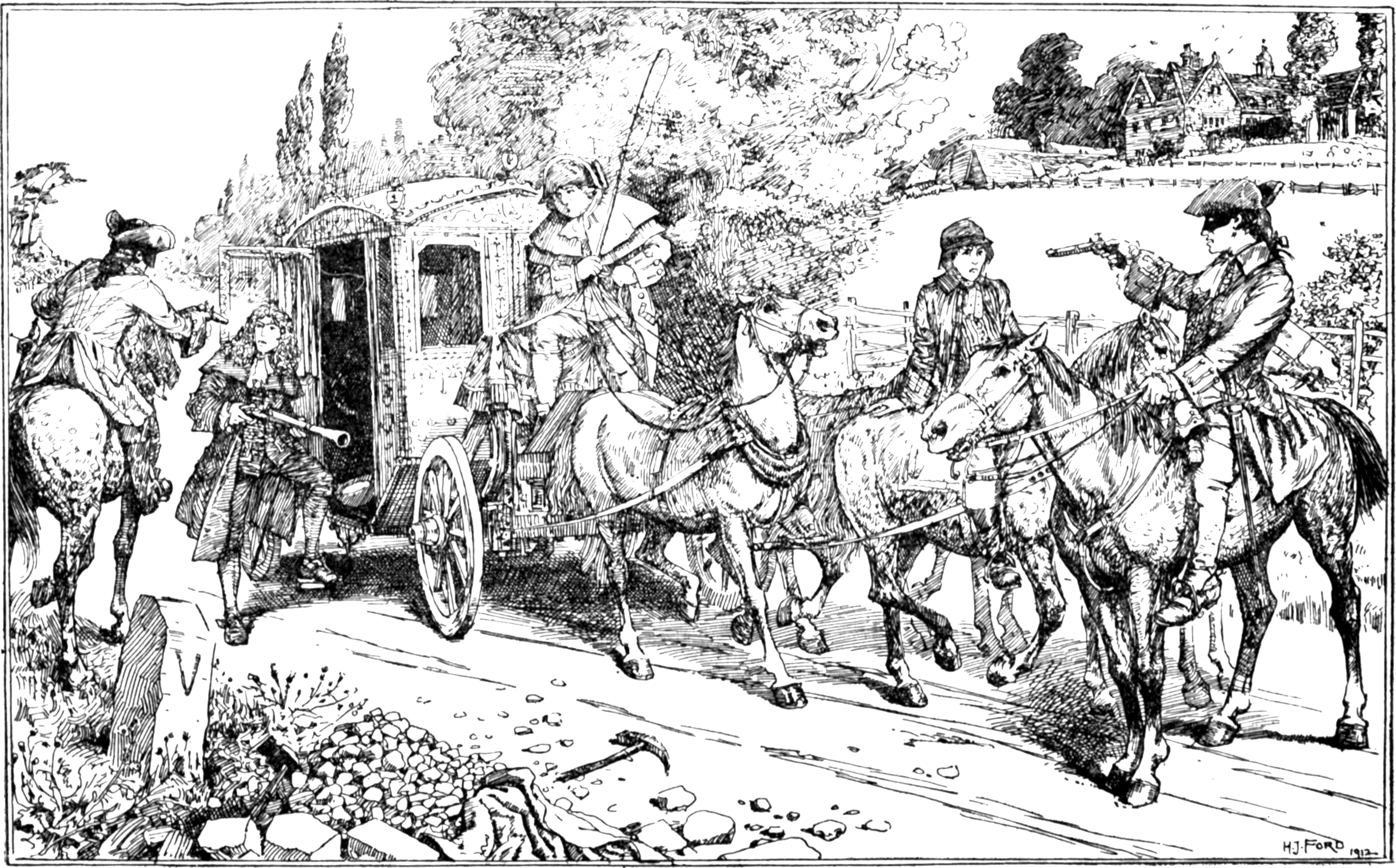
Maclean and Plunket depicted by H. J. Ford, The Strange Story Book,1913

By his own account, Maclaine embarked on his career of crime about six months after his wife's death. At his interrogation he was encouraged to lay evidence against his accomplices, and at his trial he sought to lay a good deal of the blame for his course of life upon Plunkett (who was never caught or tried), so his narrative may not be entirely accurate. He claimed that Plunkett, a fellow-Irishman, had led him to believe he had travelled abroad, and persuaded Maclaine to employ him in his household and to lend him £100, part of which was paid back sporadically. Maclaine explained his melancholy to Plunkett as his money was running out, and Plunkett replied,

"Honey, I thought, Maclean, thou hadst Spirit and Resolution, with some Knowledge of the World. A brave Man cannot want; he has a Right to live, and need not want the Conveniencies of Life, while the dull, plodding, busy Knaves carry Cash in their Pockets. We must draw upon them to supply our Wants, there need only Impudence, and getting the better of a few silly Scruples; there is scarce Courage necessary, all we have to deal with are such mere Poltroons."

Accordingly, Plunkett and Mclaine joined and went on the road as highwaymen, agreeing to share the spoils equally. They wore Venetian masks to cover their faces. Their first enterprise was on Hounslow Heath, where they held up a grazier coming away from Smithfield Market, and relieved him of £60. This was so successful that they decided to continue, and their next action was to hold up a coach on the road coming into London from St Albans. They approached on horseback from either side with pistols drawn. Maclaine said he was so nervous that it was left to Plunkett to call out the demands. Plunkett began to upbraid him for his lack of courage, and Maclaine cried out "He needs must whom the devil drives. I am over shoes and must over boots."

Afterwards, to prove himself, Maclaine alone held up a gentleman on horseback in Hyde Park and relieved him of his money and his watch. They committed around 20 highway robberies in six months, often in the then-relatively untamed Hyde Park: their victims included Sir Thomas Robinson of Vienna, and Mrs Talbot. Maclaine was only once in fear of being discovered. To allay suspicion he stayed awhile with his brother in Holland, giving him a false account of his means of living, and was introduced to polite dancing assemblies, where various purses and watches went missing.

In November 1749 occurred their most famous exploit, when, in Hyde Park between 9 and 10 o'clock at night, they held up the writer and antiquary Horace Walpole. One pointed a blunderbuss at the coachman, while the other put his pistol through the window of the carriage. Walpole wrote,

"One night, in the beginning of November 1749, as I was returning from Holland House by moonlight, about ten o'clock, I was attacked by two highwaymen in Hyde Park, and the pistol of one of them going off accidentally, raised the skin under my eye, left some marks of shot in my face, and stunned me. The ball went through the top of the chariot, and if I had sat an inch nearer to the left side, must have gone through my head."

They took his watch and purse, his sword, and some money from the footman. Soon afterwards, Maclaine sent Walpole a letter (as from "A.B. and C.D.") offering him first refusal to buy back his stolen possessions, indicating that he should send a servant with the money to a rendezvous at Tyburn, and threatening fatal consequences to Walpole if he betrayed them. He suggested he sent the footman, as he wanted to give the man his money back.

The thieves were often restrained and courteous, earning Maclaine the sobriquet "The Gentleman Highwayman". Living in St James's Street (next door to White's), he was now passing himself off as an Irish gentleman worth £700 a year, and he and Plunkett (who had lodgings in Jermyn Street) were said to be well-known figures about St James's. Maclaine kept company with some noted "Ladies of the Town", and also with certain "Women of Fortune and Reputation" who were so unguarded as to admit him to their society. He worked his way into the affections of a Lady who deserved better, but she was saved from ruin when a gentleman revealed to her Maclaine's character. He had a sufficiently low opinion of Maclaine's respectability that he was able to decline the duel which Maclaine consequently offered him. This may have been a different challenge to that which Maclaine offered to a British officer at Putney Bowling Green in the spring of 1750. The officer, who had disparaged him, declined to fight him until he should give proof of his respectable origins. Maclaine had recently obtained a certificate attesting to his descent from the nobility.

== Arrest and examinations ==
On 26 June 1750, Plunkett and Maclaine held up the coach of the Earl of Eglinton on Hounslow Heath. Plunkett went forward of the carriage and took hold of the postilion, so that Lord Eglinton, who was carrying his famous blunderbuss, could not fire at him without killing his own servant. Maclaine, who was behind, commanded his Lordship to throw his blunderbuss out of the chaise, or he would "blow his brains through his face". They took the blunderbuss, together with a portmanteau and 50 guineas.

Between one and two o'clock in the morning of the same day, they held up the flying coach at Chiswick, between Turnham Green and Brentford, which was carrying six passengers on its way to Salisbury going westward out of London. Wearing masks and carrying pistols, they demanded money from the passengers. When one, Josiah Higden, gave them a few shillings, he was told this was not enough. They ordered him out of the carriage, took more money out of his pockets, and threatened to blow his brains out for concealing it. They then obliged the coachman to help them to take two clothes trunks out of the coach boot, and rode off with them. One belonged to Mr Higden, and was later found empty in Kensington Gravel Pits. (This Josiah Higden was possibly the apothecary of Sackville Street who in May 1750 was involved in the will of Walter Chetwynd of Old Grendon, and in 1763 was elected Master of the Society of Apothecaries of London.)

After this robbery, information on the stolen items was circulated and led to Maclaine's arrest. He stripped the lace from a waistcoat taken in the robbery and attempted to sell it to a pawnbroker in Monmouth Street, who by chance took it to the same man who had just sold the lace and recognised it. Rather than returning home to fetch the money to pay for the lace, the man alerted a constable and Maclaine was arrested. When the premises were searched many of the other things the men had stolen, including Lord Eglington's blunderbuss and coat, were uncovered. They also found a frock coat with a pair of loaded pistols in the pockets. Walpole wrote, "...there were a wardrobe of clothes, three-and-twenty purses, and the celebrated blunderbuss found at his lodgings, besides a famous kept mistress." The latter distinction was claimed by, or for, Fanny Murray.

Josiah Higden, "whose word and honour are too well known to doubt the truth", decided to press charges, saying he went through with it "in duty to my country". At his arrest (which was on 27 July 1750), Maclaine was first taken for examination before Mr Justice Lediard. He began by denying the charges, and was committed to the Newgate, but very soon afterwards sent a message that he wished to make a confession. He was willing to implicate Plunkett, but the judge advised him that he would need to give them more names if he hoped for leniency, and gave him time to think about it. At his second Examination, on 1 August 1750, Maclaine declared himself to be guilty and wept piteously before the justices, but could still name only Plunkett as his confederate in crime. He brought with him a written confession, unsigned, which Mr Justice Lediard left in his hands.

A well-known print (an "Exact Representation"), showing Maclaine and "his accomplice" holding up Lord Eglinton's carriage, was published on 13 August 1750, about a month before his trial. The trial at the Old Bailey was held on 12 September, and related specifically to the robbery of Josiah Higden. The indictment was that Maclean had made an assault on Higden on the King's Highway, putting him in corporal fear and danger of his life. (This was the capital offence.) It enumerated the goods taken, including a cloth coat, a pair of cloth breeches, a periwig, a pair of pumps, five holland shirts, three linen stocks, two pairs of stockings, one silk and one worsted, a pair of gloves, a pair of silver spurs and a pair of silver shoe-buckles, a pair of knee buckles, half a pound of tea and other necessaries, including two guineas which Mr Higden had about his person.

== Trial and execution ==
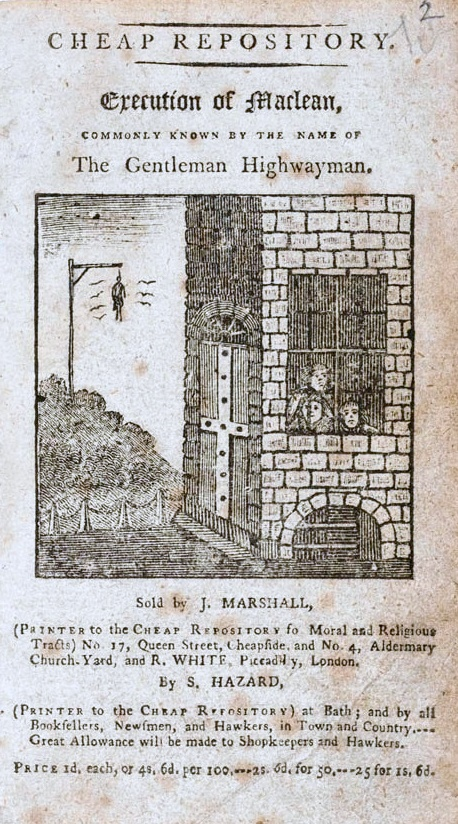
An early Tract describing the execution of James MacLaine

At Maclaine's trial at the Old Bailey, on 12 September 1750, he changed his plea again to Not Guilty, claiming that his former confession under examination had been the product of shock and mental derangement arising from the suddenness and unexpectedness of his arrest. He claimed that he had Mr Higden's coat and other belongings because Plunkett had given them to him in lieu of the remaining money that he owed him, and he (Maclaine) had no idea that they were stolen. The jury did not believe him.

The trial became a fashionable society occasion. A contemporary broadside includes an illustration: a Lady (perhaps Lady Caroline Petersham) is shown appearing as a character witness. One of the justices is saying, "What has your Ladyship to say in favour of the Prisoner at the Bar?", and she replies, "My Lord, I have had the Pleasure to know him well, he has often been about my House and I never lost anything." Lord Eglinton declined to testify against him, and Walpole, reporting Maclaine's condemnation in a letter dated 20 September, added, "I am honourably mentioned in a Grub Street ballad for not having contributed to his sentence."

His romantic circumstances touched many hearts: a print entitled "Newgates Lamentation, or the Ladys Last Farewell of Macleane" illustrates visitors to his cell. He reputedly received nearly 3,000 guests while imprisoned at the Newgate, including a visitation en masse from White's, and his room became so hot that he fainted more than once. While under sentence his portrait was drawn from the life and afterwards engraved by Louis Peter Boitard.

His brother Archibald, the minister and translator, though he was revolted and heartbroken by his brother's crimes and had often warned him of the consequences of his dissolute behaviour, wrote a letter from Utrecht to intercede with the court for mercy for his brother, and also wrote to James himself and to Dr Allen, the minister who attended him. Archibald expressed deep conflict between his compassion for the sinful man, his duty to uphold the path of righteousness, and his uncertainty of the true nature of his brother's repentance. The letter written by Archibald Maclaine to his "Unhappy Brother" on 22 September 1750 was a call to absolute repentance before God in knowledge of the coming Judgement. Dr Allen recorded his eventual narrative of confession.

He was convicted: the jury brought him in Guilty without going out of court. No remission was forthcoming, despite various signs of penitence shown by the prisoner. When the judge asked him why he should not be sentenced, Maclaine, who had prepared a short speech expressing his contrition and pleading for mercy, was unable to say more than one or two words, "My lord, I cannot speak," and stood in silence. The poet Thomas Gray, in his poem "A Long Story", referred to this when he wrote,

"A sudden fit of ague shook him,
He stood as mute as poor McLean."

He was hanged at Tyburn on 3 October 1750. Dr Allen reported that a young fellow-prisoner who had kept him company sat up with Maclaine through his last night in prayer and devotion, and as Maclaine got into the cart to take him to Tyburn he was heard to say, "Oh my God! I have forsaken thee! But I will trust in thee!" A great crowd attended the execution, before whom he maintained a steady composure, and his last words to them were, "O God, forgive my enemies, bless my friends and receive my soul!" A later publication tells that, as the cart was about to be drawn from under him, a witness heard him say, "I must never more behold this beauteous sun! Do thou, O sun of righteousness, shine on my departing soul."

== In popular culture ==
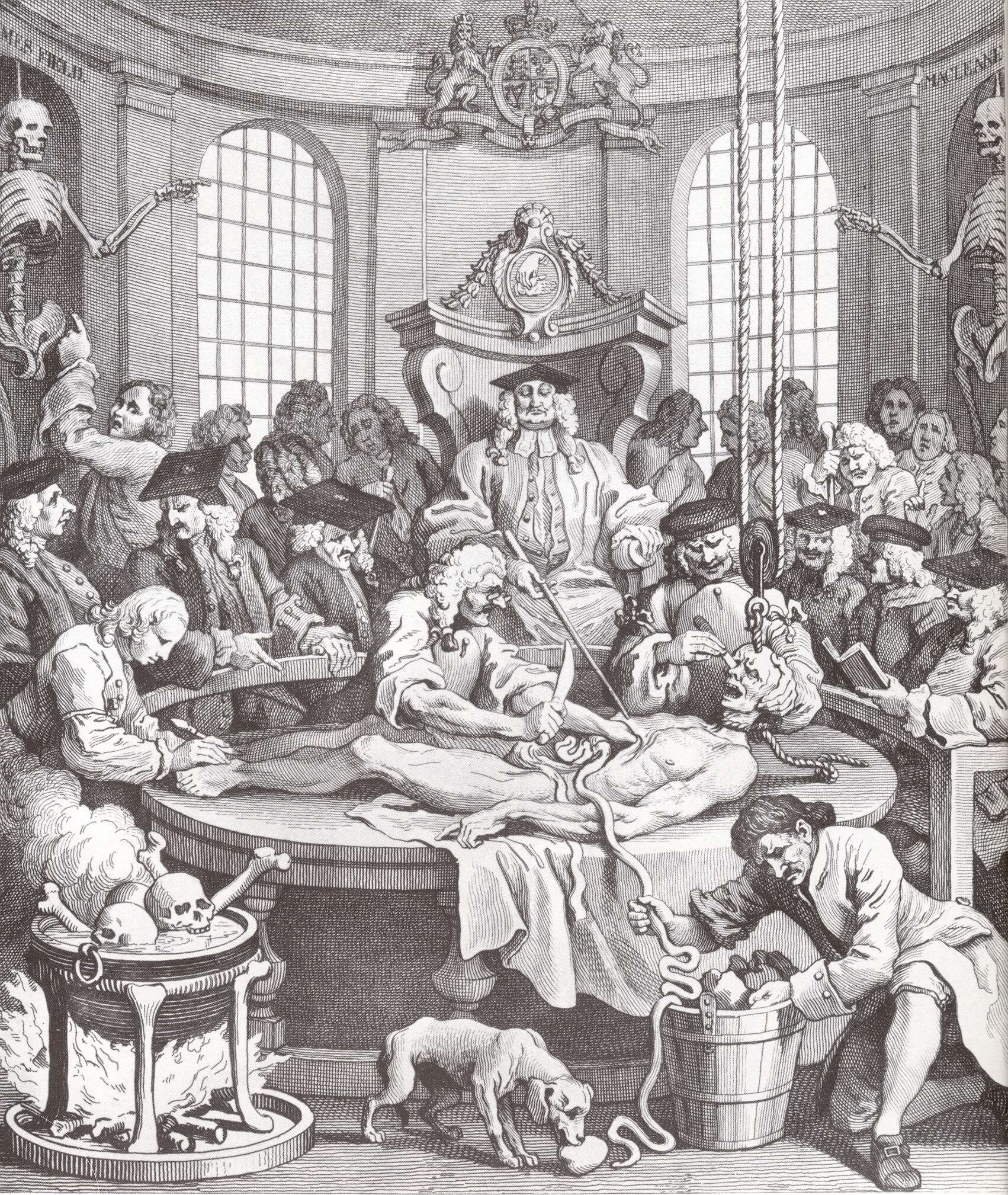
The Reward of Cruelty (Plate IV): MacLaine skeleton is at upper right

Maclaine could not have been the model for Captain Macheath, antihero of John Gay's The Beggar's Opera (reinvented by Berthold Brecht as "Mack the Knife"), because The Beggar's Opera was written in 1728, when Maclaine was only four. (The preferred claimant for that distinction is Jack Sheppard.) Rather, Maclaine's romantic image owed something to the popular example of Macheath, the chivalrous highwayman, reinforced by the fact that Macheath's character in some measure satirized Sir Robert Walpole (1st Earl of Orford, died 1745), Horace Walpole's father.

Horace Walpole alluded to this when he wrote, in 1750, that Lady Caroline Petersham and Miss Ashe were the chief personages visiting and weeping over Maclaine, and referred to them as "Polly" and "Lucy" (meaning Polly Peachum and Lucy Lockit, characters in the drama). He asked them if Maclaine did not sing "Thus I stand like the Turk with his doxies around", which was one of Macheath's songs. After Maclaine was hanged, he earned a mention in the poem The Modern Fine Lady by Soame Jenyns: as an aside after the line "She weeps if but a handsome thief is hung" the following note was added: "Some of the brightest eyes were at this time in tears for one McLean, condemned for robbery on the highway."

After his death his body was dissected and his skeleton was suspended for display in a niche in the Surgeons' Hall in London. William Hogarth included a representation of Maclaine's skeleton in the final plate of his series The Four Stages of Cruelty. Maclaine's execution was the subject of a Cheap Repository Tract of 1795, which went through several editions.

A modern fictionalised portrayal of Maclaine's life appears in the 1999 film Plunkett & Macleane, in which he was played by Jonny Lee Miller.
