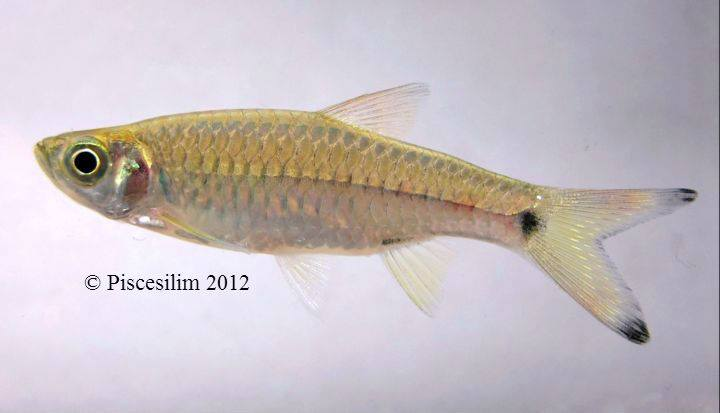

Conservation status
- Least Concern (IUCN 3.1)

Scientific classification
- Kingdom: Animalia
- Phylum: Chordata
- Class: Actinopterygii
- Division: Teleostei
- Order: Cypriniformes
- Family: Danionidae
- Subfamily: Rasborinae
- Genus: Rasbora
- Species: R. vulgaris

Binomial name
- Rasbora vulgaris Duncker, 1904

= Rasbora vulgaris =

Species of fish

Rasbora vulgaris, the blacktip rasbora, is a species of ray-finned fish in the genus Rasbora. It is a member of the R. paviana-subgroup, which comprises five species from Indochina and the Malay Peninsula (R. paviana, R. vulgaris, R. notura, R. hobelmani, and R. dorsinotata)

== Description ==
A maximum body length of 7.8 cm. However, there are unconfirmed reports of larger wild specimens up to 10 cm.

A slender-bodied species with females being much broader, with a base color of a brownish green to bluish white. The identifying feature of the species from others of its group is the lack of a black line covering the lateral line, a singular diamond black blotch at the base o the caudle peduncle, and a faded black marking near the end of each lobe of the caudal fin, near similar to the tail of R. trilineata.

== Distribution ==
It is found and is possibly endemic to the western coast of Peninsular Malaysia. However, a western Java population had been described.

== Habitat ==
It is an adaptable species being able to live in marshlands, main rivers, floodplains, lakes and even drainage systems, but it thrives the most in fast flowing, clear water forest streams with a sandy or rocky bottom. Fry and juveniles can often be caught around submerged vegetation.
