= Rasbora arundinata =

Conservation status
- Least Concern (IUCN 3.1)

Scientific classification
- Kingdom: Animalia
- Phylum: Chordata
- Class: Actinopterygii
- Order: Cypriniformes
- Family: Danionidae
- Genus: Rasbora
- Species: R. arundinata

Binomial name
- Rasbora arundinata Lumbantobing, 2014

Species of fish

Rasbora arundinata is a species of ray-finned fish in the genus Rasbora. It inhabits the Tripa Jaya, Kluet, and Alas rivers in Sumatra.

== Habitat and distribution ==
This species is native to the rivers of northwestern Sumatra. Specimens have been found in various habitats, including gravel-bottomed mountain streams, moderate-flowing turbid rivers, and muddy backwater pools. R. arundinata has been observed sympatrically with other Rasbora species such as R. api, R. kluetensis, and R. haru.

== Morphological characteristics ==
R. arundinata is distinguished by a prominent black midlateral stripe that intensifies centrally, forming a wedge-shaped subdorsal blotch, collectively resembling a reed-leaf-like profile. The body is laterally fusiform, and the species exhibits typical cyprinid features.

== Taxonomy ==
The species is part of the sumatrana group within the Rasbora genus. The formal description of R. arundinata, along with its congeners, introduced a new diagnostic character for the group: the partial exposure of the upper lip due to a submedial contact between the maxilla and the lower lip, marked posteriorly by a lachrymal groove.
