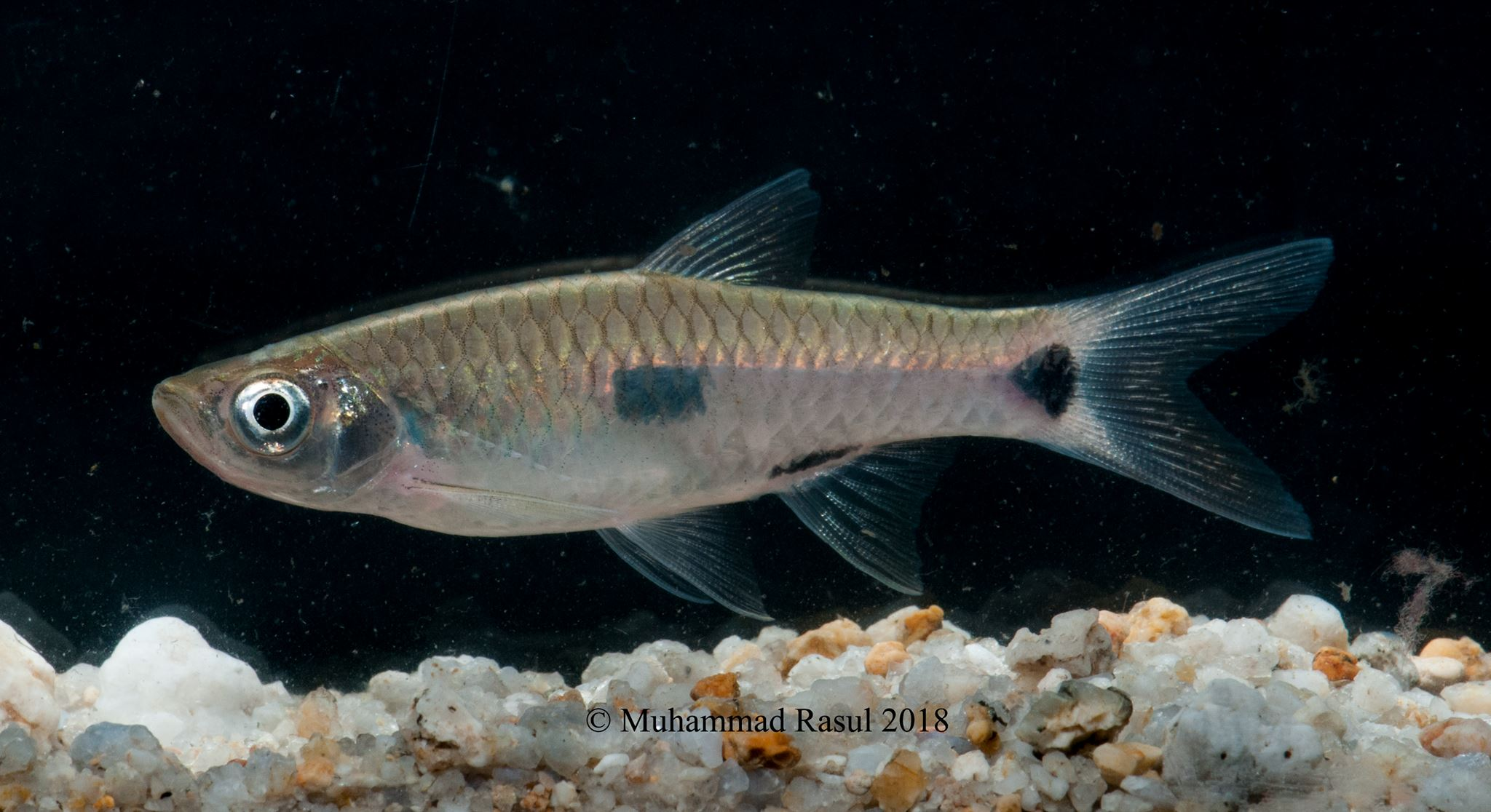

Conservation status
- Least Concern (IUCN 3.1)

Scientific classification
- Domain: Eukaryota
- Kingdom: Animalia
- Phylum: Chordata
- Class: Actinopterygii
- Order: Cypriniformes
- Family: Danionidae
- Subfamily: Rasborinae
- Genus: Rasbora
- Species: R. elegans

Binomial name
- Rasbora elegans Volz, 1903

= Twospot rasbora =

Species of fish

The twospot rasbora (Rasbora elegans) is a species of ray-finned fish in the genus Rasbora native to south east asia. It is one of the members of the Sumatrana group.

== Distribution ==
Native to Peninsular Malaysia, Singapore and the Greater Sunda Islands (except Sulawesi and Java).

In Peninsular Malaysia, it is predominately found in Johor and Pahang, but also reported from the states of Negeri Sembilan, Perak and Kelantan.

It is a commonly found species in Singapore and can even be encountered outside the central catchment area of the island.

On Sumatra, the only record of the species is from the small island of Nias, although presumably it also occurs on the main island.

On Borneo, it is only confirm to occur in East Kalimantan and parts of the lower Kapuas River basin in West Kalimantan. It is not known if the species occur in Malaysian Borneo, Brunei Darussalam or north Kalimantan, Indonesia.

== Description ==
It is easily distinguishable from others of its genus by lacking a dark stripe along the lateral line. Instead it possesses one rectangular spot below the dorsal fin origin and lateral line, and a second triangular spot at the caudal peduncle. The spots can be a dark black or faded, depending on the habitat and locality. In some cases a small marking can present above the anal fin.

R. bunguranensis and R. spilotaenia used to be thought as subspecies of R. elegans.

== Habitat ==
It can be found in clear forest streams and creaks with sandy or rocky bottom, spending most of its time near the surface searching for insects and other prey
