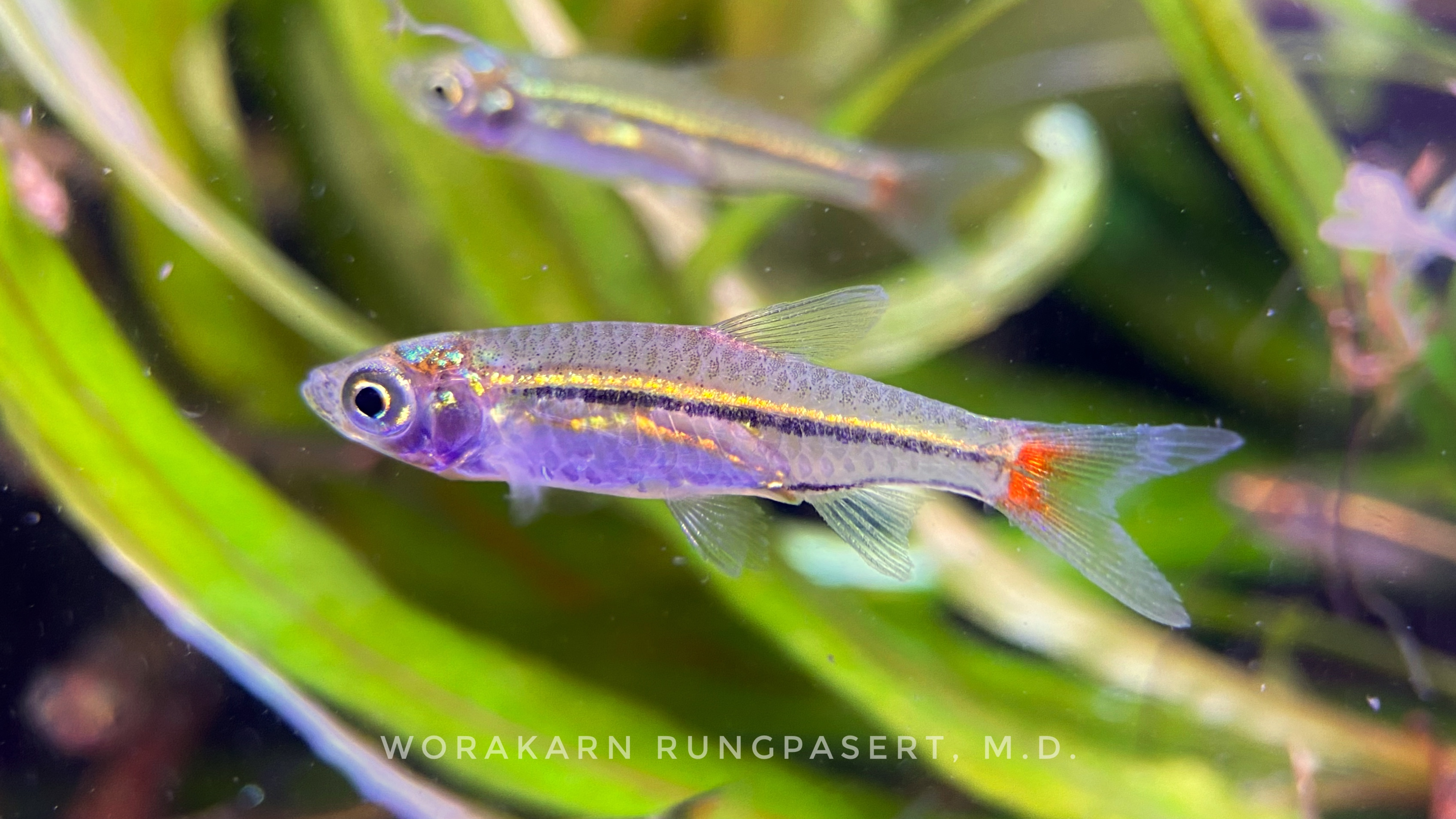

Conservation status
- Least Concern (IUCN 3.1)

Scientific classification
- Kingdom: Animalia
- Phylum: Chordata
- Class: Actinopterygii
- Order: Cypriniformes
- Family: Danionidae
- Subfamily: Rasborinae
- Genus: Rasbora
- Species: R. borapetensis

Binomial name
- Rasbora borapetensis Smith, 1934

= Blackline rasbora =

Species of fish

The blackline rasbora (Rasbora borapetensis) is a fish of the family Cyprinidae found in Asia in the Mekong, Chao Phraya, and Mae Klong basins, and also the northern Malay Peninsula. In the aquarium trade, it is known by a variety of other names, including red-tailed rasbora, bora bora rasbora, and brilliant rasbora.

== Description ==
The blackline rasbora is a streamlined, silver fish with a dark brown or black, mid-lateral stripe reaching from the gill opening to the front of the caudal fin base. Above this line is a gold stripe. The caudal fin is bright red, and unlike Rasbora einthovenii, there is no black pigment. The two sexes look alike, but adult females are slightly larger than males. The fish grows to about 2.5 inches (64 mm) in length.

== Habitat ==
The blackline rasbora swims from the midwater level to the surface in ponds, ditches, canals, and reservoir margins of 2 metres (6 ft 7 in) depth or less. It prefers a pH range of 6.5 to 7.0, water hardness (dH) of 5 to 12, and temperatures between 22 and 26 °C (72 and 79 °F).

A blackline rasbora

== In the aquarium ==
The blackline rasbora is a popular aquarium fish that prefers slow moving water and a heavily planted tank. It is a true schooling fish and will almost always be observed in a tight school, racing back and forth in the middle and upper aquarium levels. It is a hardy, peaceful fish which can be housed with other peaceful species such as loaches, small and large tetras, livebearers, plecos, and rainbowfish.

== See also ==
- List of freshwater aquarium fish species
- Rasbora
- Rasbora rubrodorsalis a very similar fish
