= Betta dennisyongi =

Conservation status
- Vulnerable (IUCN 3.1)

Scientific classification
- Domain: Eukaryota
- Kingdom: Animalia
- Phylum: Chordata
- Class: Actinopterygii
- Order: Anabantiformes
- Family: Osphronemidae
- Genus: Betta
- Species: B. dennisyongi

Binomial name
- Betta dennisyongi Tan, 2013

Species of fish

Betta dennisyongi is a species of gourami. It is native to Asia, where it occurs on the island of Sumatra in Indonesia, ranging from Meulaboh to Singkil. It is typically seen in lowland hillstreams and acidic swamps with clear to brown water, including farmland environments. It is known to occur alongside the species Kryptopterus piperatus, Mystus punctifer, Nemacheilus tuberigum, Ompok brevirictus, Osteochilus jeruk, Rasbora jacobsoni, and Rasbora kluetensis. The species reaches 3.5 cm (1.4 inches) in standard length and is known to be a facultative air-breather.
