= Rasbora taytayensis =

Conservation status
- Vulnerable (IUCN 3.1)

Scientific classification
- Kingdom: Animalia
- Phylum: Chordata
- Class: Actinopterygii
- Order: Cypriniformes
- Family: Danionidae
- Subfamily: Rasborinae
- Genus: Rasbora
- Species: R. taytayensis

Binomial name
- Rasbora taytayensis Herre, 1924

Species of fish

Rasbora taytayensis, the Taytay pygmy rasbora, is a species inquirenda of ray-finned fish in the genus Rasbora which is endemic to Taytay in Palawan.
