= Rasbora johannae =

Conservation status
- Least Concern (IUCN 3.1)

Scientific classification
- Kingdom: Animalia
- Phylum: Chordata
- Class: Actinopterygii
- Order: Cypriniformes
- Family: Danionidae
- Subfamily: Rasborinae
- Genus: Rasbora
- Species: R. johannae

Binomial name
- Rasbora johannae Siebert & Guiry, 1996

Species of fish

Rasbora johannae is a species of ray-finned fish in the genus Rasbora. It is endemic to Kalimantan. This species reaches a length of 3.8 cm (1.5 in).

== Etymology ==
The fish is named in memory of British politician Joan Helen Vickers (1907-1994), a British Conservative London Councillor and Member of Parliament and later the chairman of the Anglo-Indonesian Society.
