= Rasbora caverii =

Conservation status
- Least Concern (IUCN 3.1)

Scientific classification
- Kingdom: Animalia
- Phylum: Chordata
- Class: Actinopterygii
- Order: Cypriniformes
- Family: Danionidae
- Genus: Rasbora
- Species: R. caverii

Binomial name
- Rasbora caverii (Jerdon, 1849)

Synonyms
- Leuciscus caverii Jerdon, 1849

Species of fish

Rasbora caverii, the Cauvery rasbora, is a species of freshwater ray-finned fish belonging to the genus Rasbora within the subfamily Rasborinae of the family Danionidae.< This species is found in southern India and Sri Lanka.
