= Chinese rasbora =

Conservation status
- Least Concern (IUCN 3.1)

Scientific classification
- Kingdom: Animalia
- Phylum: Chordata
- Class: Actinopterygii
- Order: Cypriniformes
- Family: Danionidae
- Subfamily: Rasborinae
- Genus: Rasbora
- Species: R. steineri

Binomial name
- Rasbora steineri Nichols & C. H. Pope, 1927

Species of fish

The Chinese rasbora (Rasbora steineri) is a species of ray-finned fish in the genus Rasbora found in southern China, Laos, and central and northern Vietnam.
