= Rasbora ennealepis =

Conservation status
- Near Threatened (IUCN 3.1)

Scientific classification
- Kingdom: Animalia
- Phylum: Chordata
- Class: Actinopterygii
- Order: Cypriniformes
- Family: Danionidae
- Subfamily: Rasborinae
- Genus: Rasbora
- Species: R. ennealepis

Binomial name
- Rasbora ennealepis T. R. Roberts, 1989

Species of fish

Rasbora ennealepis is a species of ray-finned fish in the genus Rasbora. It is endemic to Kalimantan, Indonesia.
