= Rasbora septentrionalis =

Conservation status
- Data Deficient (IUCN 3.1)

Scientific classification
- Domain: Eukaryota
- Kingdom: Animalia
- Phylum: Chordata
- Class: Actinopterygii
- Order: Cypriniformes
- Family: Danionidae
- Subfamily: Rasborinae
- Genus: Rasbora
- Species: R. septentrionalis

Binomial name
- Rasbora septentrionalis Kottelat, 2000

Species of fish

Rasbora septentrionalis is a species of ray-finned fish in the genus Rasbora which is found in the Mekong Basin in Yunnan and Laos.
