= Yellow rasbora =

Conservation status
- Vulnerable (IUCN 3.1)

Scientific classification
- Kingdom: Animalia
- Phylum: Chordata
- Class: Actinopterygii
- Division: Teleostei
- Order: Cypriniformes
- Family: Danionidae
- Subfamily: Rasborinae
- Genus: Rasbora
- Species: R. lateristriata

Binomial name
- Rasbora lateristriata (Bleeker, 1854)

Synonyms
- Leuciscus lateristriatus Bleeker, 1854

Species of fish

The yellow rasbora (Rasbora lateristriata) is a species of ray-finned fish in the genus Rasbora from Southeast Asia. It is a primarily freshwater fish originally from Java island in Indonesia. It is known as the wader pari fish in the Indonesian language. It was a protein source for the local community.

The taxonomy, phylogeny, and distributional boundaries have not been fully studied.

== Distribution ==
The species can be found in Indonesia, Thailand, Malaysia, Vietnam, Philippines, Singapore and the United States. The distribution is fairly reliable according to their genus distribution in which they are native to freshwater habitats in South, Southeast Asia and southeast China.

A journal has stated that R. lateristriata had a west-to-east direction of divergence and migration from the Miocene to the Plio-Pleistocene. R. lateristriata is often considered to be widely distributed from Sumatra, Java, Bali, across Wallace's Line, to Lombok and the Sumbawa Islands of Indonesia (e.g., Froese and Pauly, 2015).

== Habitat and feeding habits ==
It is a type of riverine fish found in mountainous streams that are in shallow areas, and have relatively fast flowing water and plenty of gravel at the river floor.

The fish is an omnivorous feeder which feeds on phytoplankton, zooplankton, insect larvae, leaves and small caterpillars. It feeds continuously through the day and night. It is hunted by snake head and red devil fish in the natural ecosystem.

== Spawning site ==
The requirement for the spawning site is to have clean shallow water with smooth flow, availability of sand and gravel, and no garbage. Depth of the spawning site is about 30 cm. Artificial induced spawning is unknown.

== Morphology ==
Dorsal spines (total): 2; Dorsal soft rays (total): 7; Anal spines: 3; Anal soft rays: 5. Preserved color dark brown dorsally, whitish to yellowish on sides and below; scales margined with minute dark spots; opercle with silvery black spot. 12 scales between nape and dorsal. Mouth strongly oblique with anterior end as high as upper margin of pupil; maxillary extends posteriorly below anterior margin of eye. Lateral line complete, reaching caudal, with 7 rows of scales between lateral lines over middle of caudal peduncle.

== Incident ==
The eruption of Kelud volcano on February 13, 2014, released a huge amount of volcanic dust and nearly covered the whole of Java island. The exposure of fish to the volcanic dust dissolved in the water affected and caused change to the histological structure of the gills and intestine, but did not have an effect on the histological structure of the eyes, liver and gonad of the wader pari fish.

== Current status ==
R. lateristriata is at vulnerable according to IUCN Red List and the population is declining with numbers from 10,000 to 100,000 mature individuals. The original habitat which used to be moderately abundant is becoming rare which leads to less opportunity for a researcher to do sampling. The declining population trend was probably caused by declining and inconsistent rainfall.
