= Largescaled rasbora =

Conservation status
- Least Concern (IUCN 3.1)

Scientific classification
- Kingdom: Animalia
- Phylum: Chordata
- Class: Actinopterygii
- Order: Cypriniformes
- Family: Danionidae
- Subfamily: Rasborinae
- Genus: Rasbora
- Species: R. paucisqualis

Binomial name
- Rasbora paucisqualis C. G. E. Ahl, 1935

Species of fish

The largescaled rasbora (Rasbora paucisqualis) is a species of ray-finned fish in the genus Rasbora. It is a lotic species found in the Mekong basin and in Malaysia.
