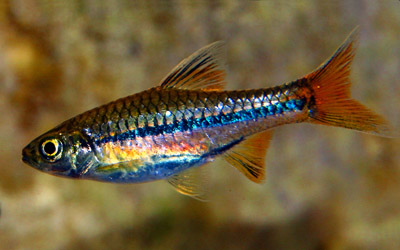
- male
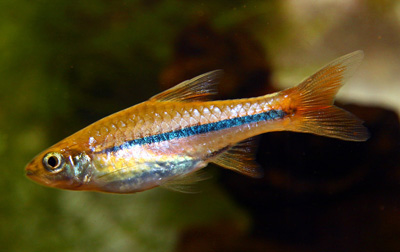
- female

Conservation status
- Least Concern (IUCN 3.1)

Scientific classification
- Kingdom: Animalia
- Phylum: Chordata
- Class: Actinopterygii
- Order: Cypriniformes
- Family: Danionidae
- Subfamily: Rasborinae
- Genus: Rasbora
- Species: R. sarawakensis

Binomial name
- Rasbora sarawakensis Brittan, 1951

= Rasbora sarawakensis =

Species of fish

Rasbora sarawakensis, also known as the blue line rasbora or Sarawak rasbora, is a species of ray-finned fish in the genus Rasbora which is endemic to the island of Borneo.

== Description ==
Rasbora sarawakensis males reach a maximum standard length of 4.5 cm. It is a relatively stout bodied Rasbora with a large, pointed head. It has a golden ground colour with orange fins and blue longitudinal stripe. The less colourful females are normally larger and more pot-bellied than the more highly coloured males. These fish are usually found in schools of 7 to 12 or more.

== Distribution ==
Rasbora sarawakensis is endemic to Borneo, occurring in both the Malaysian state of Sarawak and the Indonesia province of Kalimantan Barat. Within its range it has from many river systems including the Batang Kayan and Sungai Sarawak in Sarawak and the Mempawah and Melawi in Kalimantan Barat.

== Habitat ==
Rasbora sarawakensis occurs in rather sluggish flowing forest streams, with dense emergent vegetation, often lying within the shade of the rainforest canopy. The bed of these streams is normally made up of a thick layer of silt which is covered with fallen tree limbs and leaf litter, the water is usually relatively clear but has a pale brown color from the tannins released by the organic matter that has fallen into the stream as it decomposes.

== Biology ==
The diet of Rasbora sarawakensis is not known but like its congeners it probably feeds on both aquatic invertebrates and on terrestrial invertebrates which fall into the water. It is a sociable fish living in schools where the brighter males display with each other to attract females It is thought that its breeding behaviour is similar to other rasboras in that it is a continuous egg-scattering fish which does not demonstrate any parental care.

== Aquariums ==
Rasbora sarwakensis is not common in the aquarium trade but it is an attractive and sociable species which can be found for sale imported from Borneo. It has not yet been bred in captivity although Rasboras will occasionally spawn in the right aquarium conditions
