= Rasbora bankanensis =

Conservation status
- Least Concern (IUCN 3.1)

Scientific classification
- Kingdom: Animalia
- Phylum: Chordata
- Class: Actinopterygii
- Order: Cypriniformes
- Family: Danionidae
- Subfamily: Rasborinae
- Genus: Rasbora
- Species: R. bankanensis

Binomial name
- Rasbora bankanensis (Bleeker, 1853)

Synonyms
- Leuciscus bankanensis Bleeker, 1853

Species of fish

Rasbora bankanensis is a species of ray-finned fish in the genus Rasbora. It occurs in the Malay Peninsula and Indonesia and may be a complex of several species.
