= Wilpita rasbora =

Conservation status
- Vulnerable (IUCN 3.1)

Scientific classification
- Kingdom: Animalia
- Phylum: Chordata
- Class: Actinopterygii
- Order: Cypriniformes
- Family: Danionidae
- Subfamily: Rasborinae
- Genus: Rasbora
- Species: R. wilpita

Binomial name
- Rasbora wilpita Kottelat & Pethiyagoda, 1991

Species of fish

The Wilpita rasbora (Rasbora wilpita) is a species of ray-finned fish in the family Danionidae. It is found only in southwestern Sri Lanka where it occurs in heavily shaded shallow, sluggish, streams.
