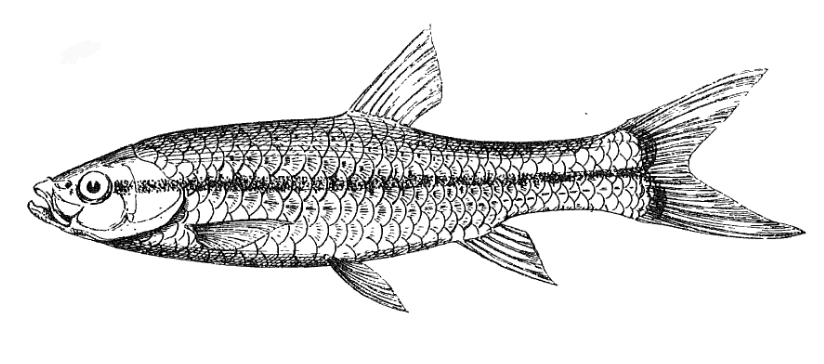

Conservation status
- Least Concern (IUCN 3.1)

Scientific classification
- Kingdom: Animalia
- Phylum: Chordata
- Class: Actinopterygii
- Division: Teleostei
- Order: Cypriniformes
- Family: Danionidae
- Subfamily: Rasborinae
- Genus: Rasbora
- Species: R. daniconius

Binomial name
- Rasbora daniconius (F. Hamilton, 1822)

Synonyms
- Cyprinus daniconius Hamilton, 1822; Leuciscus daniconius (Hamilton, 1822); Opsarius daniconius (Hamilton, 1822); Parluciosoma daniconius (Hamilton, 1822); Cyprinus anjana Hamilton, 1822; Leuciscus anjana (Hamilton, 1822); Opsarius anjana (Hamilton, 1822); Leuciscus lateralis McClelland, 1839; Leuciscus malabaricus Jerdon, 1849; Rasbora malabarica (Jerdon, 1849); Leuciscus flavus Jerdon, 1849; Leuciscus xanthogramme Jerdon, 1849; Rasbora woolaree Day, 1867; Rasbora neilgherriensis Day, 1867; Rasbora zanzibarensis Günther, 1867; Rasbora palustris Smith, 1945

= Slender rasbora =

Species of fish

The black-line rasbora or slender rasbora (Rasbora daniconius) (called darka at Rangpur) is a species of ray-finned fish in the cyprinid family. It is found in rivers of South and Southeast Asia, ranging from Sri Lanka and the Indus basin to the northern Malay Peninsula and the Mekong.

The body is oblong and compressed. The greatest width of the head equals its post-orbital length. It reaches 15 cm (5.9 in) in length.
