= Rasbora reticulata =

Conservation status
- Least Concern (IUCN 3.1)

Scientific classification
- Kingdom: Animalia
- Phylum: Chordata
- Class: Actinopterygii
- Order: Cypriniformes
- Family: Danionidae
- Subfamily: Rasborinae
- Genus: Rasbora
- Species: R. reticulata

Binomial name
- Rasbora reticulata M. C. W. Weber & de Beaufort, 1915

Species of fish

Rasbora reticulata is a species of ray-finned fish in the genus Rasbora from Sumatra and Nias Island in Indonesia.
