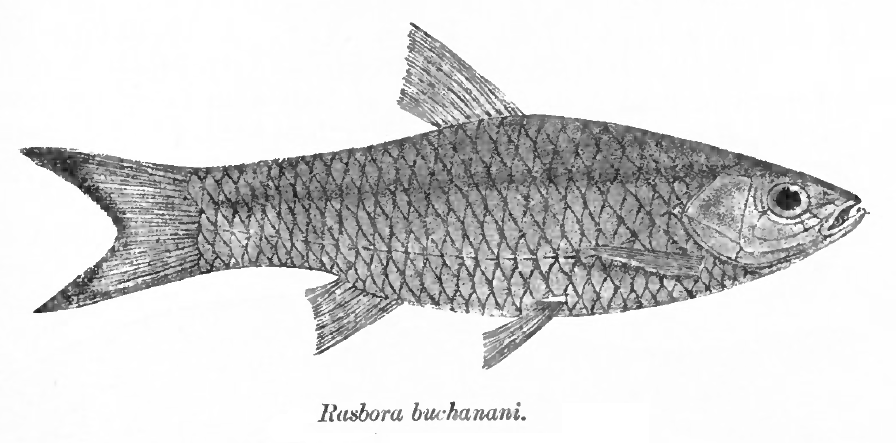

Conservation status
- Least Concern (IUCN 3.1)

Scientific classification
- Kingdom: Animalia
- Phylum: Chordata
- Class: Actinopterygii
- Order: Cypriniformes
- Family: Danionidae
- Subfamily: Rasborinae
- Genus: Rasbora
- Species: R. rasbora

Binomial name
- Rasbora rasbora (F. Hamilton, 1822)

Synonyms
- Cyprinus rasbora Hamilton, 1822; Leuciscus rasbora (Hamilton, 1822); Leuciscus presbyter Valenciennes, 1844; Leuciscus microcephalus Jerdon, 1849; Rasbora buchanani Bleeker, 1860

= Gangetic scissortail rasbora =

Species of fish

The Gangetic scissortail rasbora (Rasbora rasbora) is a species of ray-finned fish in the genus Rasbora. This species is found from Pakistan to Thailand.
