= Rasbora tobana =

Conservation status
- Least Concern (IUCN 3.1)

Scientific classification
- Kingdom: Animalia
- Phylum: Chordata
- Class: Actinopterygii
- Order: Cypriniformes
- Family: Danionidae
- Subfamily: Rasborinae
- Genus: Rasbora
- Species: R. tobana

Binomial name
- Rasbora tobana C. G. E. Ahl, 1934

Species of fish

Rasbora tobana is a species of ray-finned fish in the genus Rasbora from Sumatra, Indonesia. It is restricted to Lake Toba and some of the rivers that run into the lake, as well as some neighbouring river basins.
