= Rasbora atridorsalis =

Conservation status
- Least Concern (IUCN 3.1)

Scientific classification
- Kingdom: Animalia
- Phylum: Chordata
- Class: Actinopterygii
- Order: Cypriniformes
- Family: Danionidae
- Subfamily: Rasborinae
- Genus: Rasbora
- Species: R. atridorsalis

Binomial name
- Rasbora atridorsalis Kottelat & X. L. Chu, 1988

Species of fish

Rasbora atridorsalis is a species of ray-finned fish in the genus Rasbora. It is found in the Mekong basin in Xishuangbanna and in Laos.
