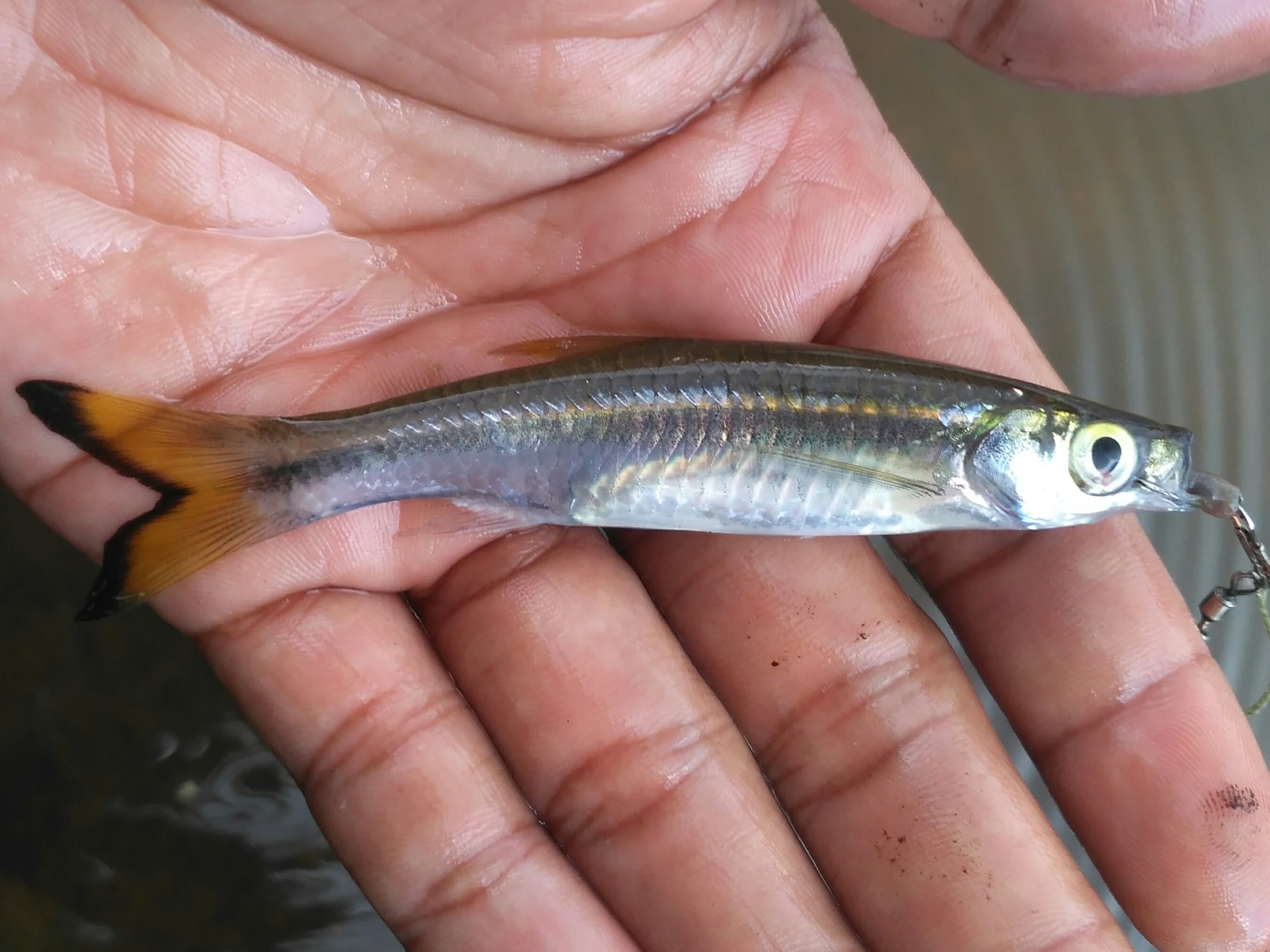

Conservation status
- Least Concern (IUCN 3.1)

Scientific classification
- Kingdom: Animalia
- Phylum: Chordata
- Class: Actinopterygii
- Order: Cypriniformes
- Family: Danionidae
- Subfamily: Rasborinae
- Genus: Rasbora
- Species: R. dusonensis

Binomial name
- Rasbora dusonensis (Bleeker, 1850)

Synonyms
- Leuciscus dusonensis Bleeker, 1850; Parluciosoma dusonensis (Bleeker, 1850)

= Rosefin rasbora =

Species of fish

The rosefin rasbora (Rasbora dusonensis) is a species of ray-finned fish in the genus Rasbora from Southeast Asia.
