= Rasbora volzii =

Conservation status
- Least Concern (IUCN 3.1)

Scientific classification
- Kingdom: Animalia
- Phylum: Chordata
- Class: Actinopterygii
- Order: Cypriniformes
- Family: Danionidae
- Subfamily: Rasborinae
- Genus: Rasbora
- Species: R. volzii

Binomial name
- Rasbora volzii Popta, 1905

Species of fish

Rasbora volzii is a species of ray-finned fish in the genus Rasbora, from Sarawak and West Kalimantan on Borneo. They are associated with fresh water habitat. Rasbora volzii have sexual reproduction. Individuals can grow up to 12.6 cm.

This species is most commonly found in Indonesia and Malaysia. Not much is known about this species due to the low rate of occurrences. In 2010, there were 22 occurrences with this species, which is the most in one year.
