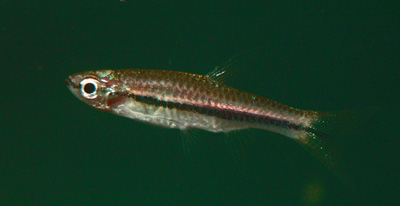

Conservation status
- Data Deficient (IUCN 3.1)

Scientific classification
- Kingdom: Animalia
- Phylum: Chordata
- Class: Actinopterygii
- Order: Cypriniformes
- Family: Danionidae
- Subfamily: Rasborinae
- Genus: Rasbora
- Species: R. rutteni

Binomial name
- Rasbora rutteni M. C. W. Weber & de Beaufort, 1916

= Rasbora rutteni =

Species of fish

Rasbora rutteni is a species of freshwater ray-finned fish in the genus Rasbora from Borneo.
