= Pale rasbora =

Conservation status
- Least Concern (IUCN 3.1)

Scientific classification
- Kingdom: Animalia
- Phylum: Chordata
- Class: Actinopterygii
- Order: Cypriniformes
- Family: Danionidae
- Subfamily: Rasborinae
- Genus: Rasbora
- Species: R. aurotaenia

Binomial name
- Rasbora aurotaenia Tirant, 1885

Species of fish

Pale rasbora (Rasbora aurotaenia) is a species of ray-finned fish in the genus Rasbora. It is known from the Chao Phraya and Mekong basins as well as from the Maeklong River in Southeast Asia. It can grow to 15 cm (5.9 in) SL.

== Description ==
This fish lives near the surface of ponds, lakes, canals and rivers. Usually found in turbid waters. The main food is probably exogenous insects and some algae. They lay eggs in ponds and rivers during the rainy season.

Perfect side line; pale with a neon green stripe running above the dark lateral midline stripe when alive. Dorsal fin base is closer to the caudal fin base than eye; caudal fin bright yellow, with black posterior margin.

== Human uses ==
Not of great commercial value. Sometimes sold as fresh fish, but also used as beef sauce in Khmer cuisine in Cambodia and southern Vietnam.
