= Rasbora dies =

Conservation status
- Data Deficient (IUCN 3.1)

Scientific classification
- Kingdom: Animalia
- Phylum: Chordata
- Class: Actinopterygii
- Order: Cypriniformes
- Family: Danionidae
- Subfamily: Rasborinae
- Genus: Rasbora
- Species: R. dies

Binomial name
- Rasbora dies Kottelat, 2008

Species of fish

Rasbora dies is a species of ray-finned fish in the genus Rasbora. This species is endemic to eastern Borneo.
