= Rasbora meinkeni =

Conservation status
- Least Concern (IUCN 3.1)

Scientific classification
- Kingdom: Animalia
- Phylum: Chordata
- Class: Actinopterygii
- Order: Cypriniformes
- Family: Danionidae
- Subfamily: Rasborinae
- Genus: Rasbora
- Species: R. meinkeni

Binomial name
- Rasbora meinkeni de Beaufort, 1931

Species of fish

Rasbora meinkeni is a species of cyprinid fish in the genus Rasbora from Sumatra.

== Etymology ==
The fish is named in honor of aquarist/ichthyologist Herrmann Meinken (1896-1976), who gave de Beaufort a this species in the form of a breeding pair on which description is based.
