= Rasbora patrickyapi =

Conservation status
- Near Threatened (IUCN 3.1)

Scientific classification
- Kingdom: Animalia
- Phylum: Chordata
- Class: Actinopterygii
- Order: Cypriniformes
- Family: Danionidae
- Subfamily: Rasborinae
- Genus: Rasbora
- Species: R. patrickyapi

Binomial name
- Rasbora patrickyapi H. H. Tan, 2009

Species of fish

Rasbora patrickyapi is a species of cyprinid fish. It is endemic to Kalimantan, Indonesian Borneo. It inhabits peat swamps and blackwater streams. It grows to 5.7 cm (2.2 in) standard length.

A common name already seeing some use is "Patrick's Rasbora". To quote Dr. Tan: Named for Patrick Yap Boon Hiang, a long-time supporter of the museum and freshwater fish enthusiast and exporter, who has generously donated much fish material for the author's research.
