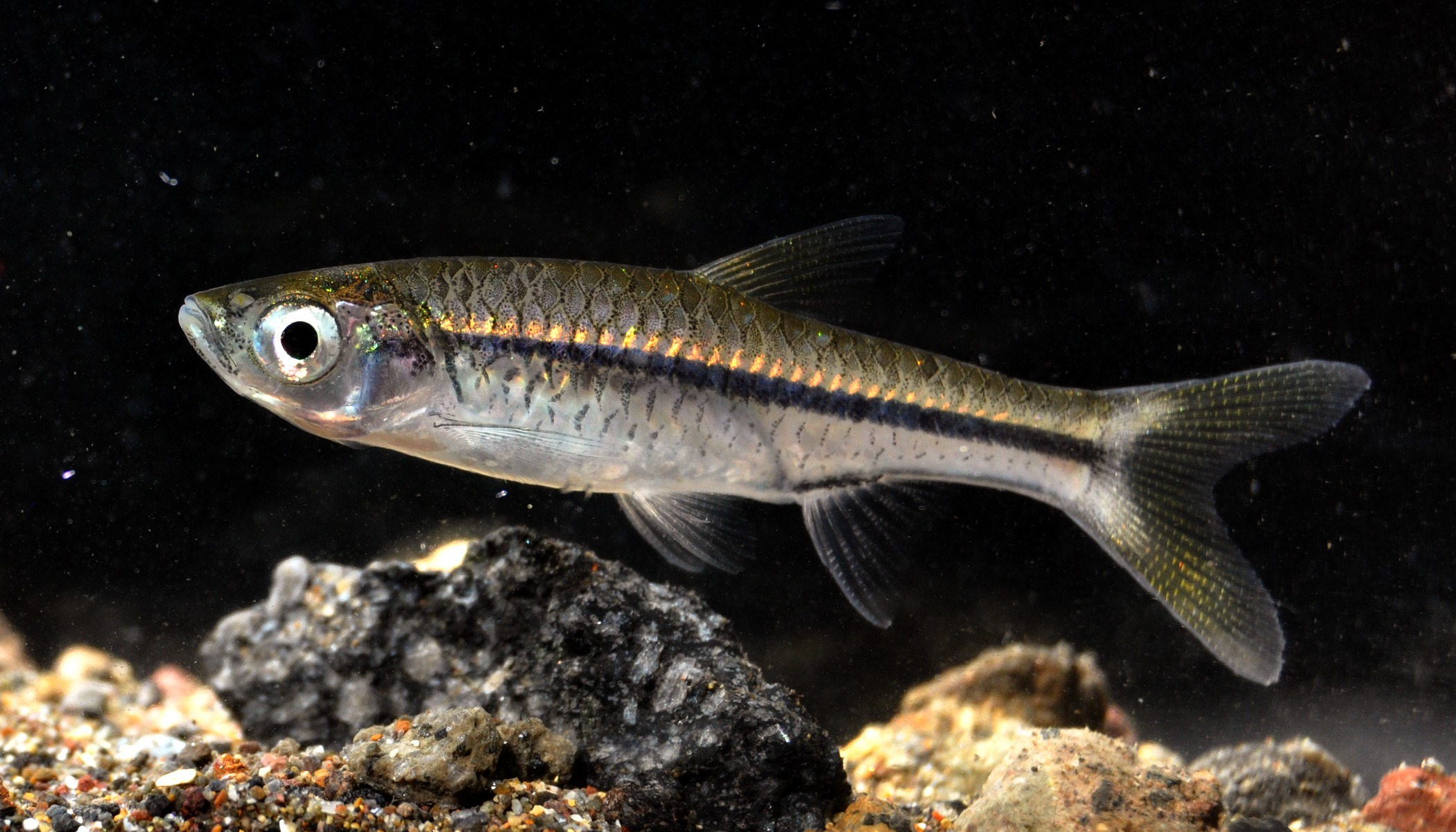

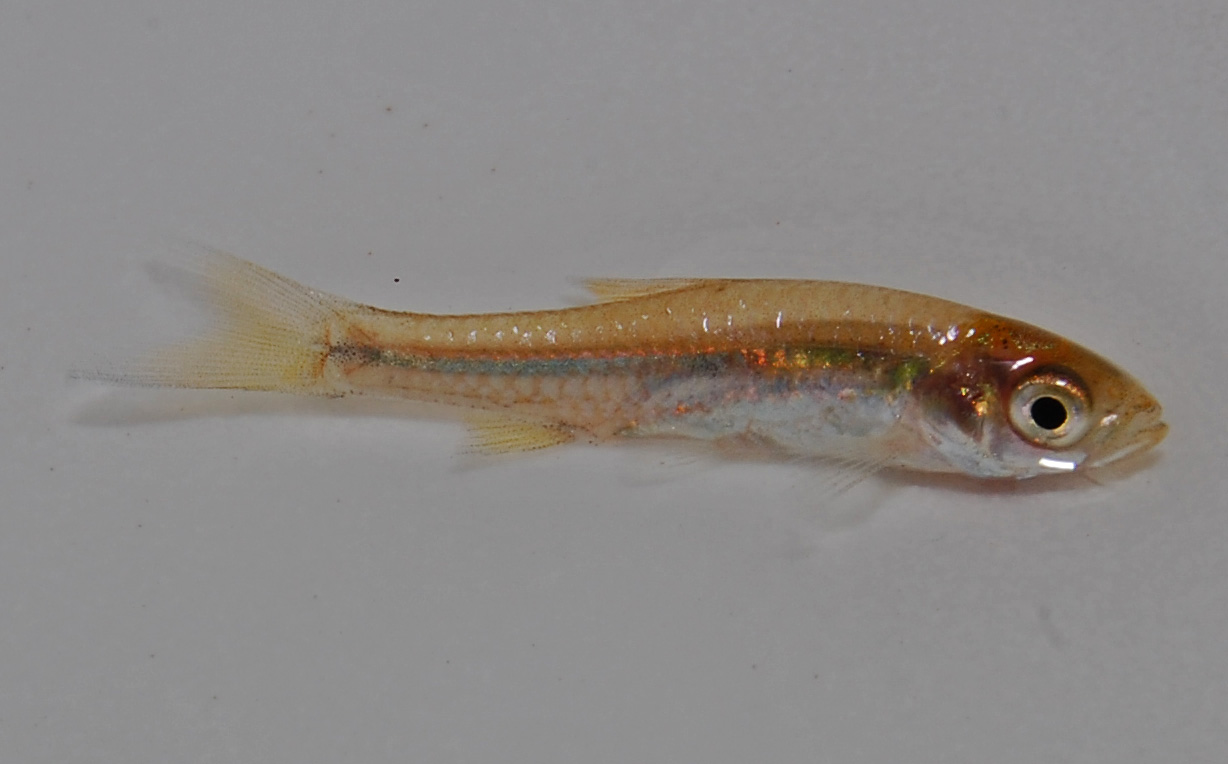
- Young adult above, juvenile below

Conservation status
- Least Concern (IUCN 3.1)

Scientific classification
- Kingdom: Animalia
- Phylum: Chordata
- Class: Actinopterygii
- Order: Cypriniformes
- Family: Danionidae
- Subfamily: Rasborinae
- Genus: Rasbora
- Species: R. argyrotaenia

Binomial name
- Rasbora argyrotaenia (Bleeker, 1849)

Synonyms
- Leuciscus argyrotaenia Bleeker, 1849

= Silver rasbora =

Species of fish

The silver rasbora (Rasbora argyrotaenia) is a species of ray-finned fish in the genus Rasbora. It occurs in the Mekong, Chao Phraya and Mae Klong basins, Malay Peninsula as well as Borneo, Java and Sumatra.
