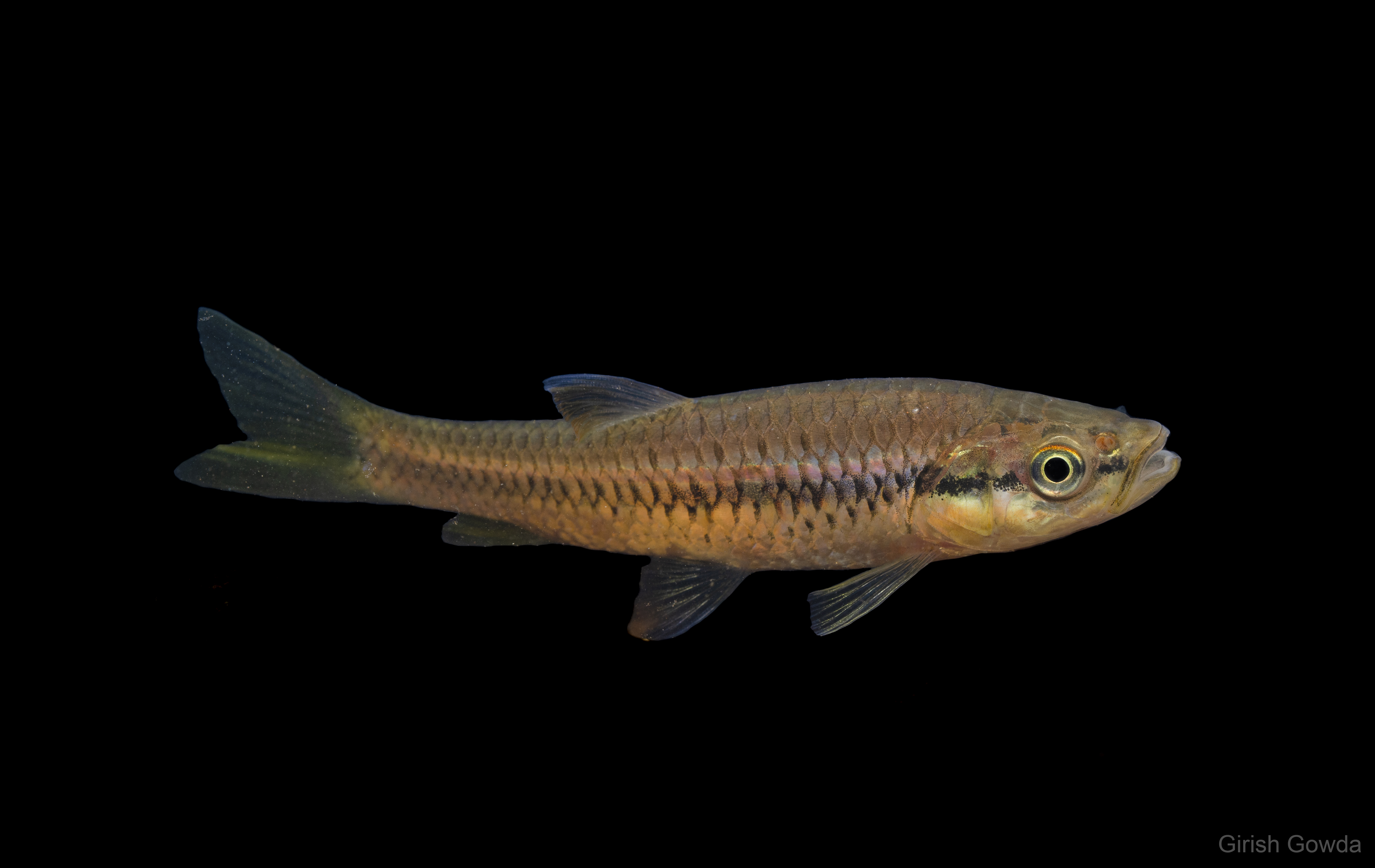

Conservation status
- Least Concern (IUCN 3.1)

Scientific classification
- Kingdom: Animalia
- Phylum: Chordata
- Class: Actinopterygii
- Order: Cypriniformes
- Family: Danionidae
- Subfamily: Rasborinae
- Genus: Rasbora
- Species: R. dandia

Binomial name
- Rasbora dandia (Valenciennes, 1844)

Synonyms
- Leuciscus dandia Valenciennes, 1844

= Rasbora dandia =

Species of fish

Rasbora dandia is a species of ray-finned fish in the genus Rasbora from India, Pakistan and Sri Lanka.
