= Rasbora baliensis =

Conservation status
- Least Concern (IUCN 3.1)

Scientific classification
- Kingdom: Animalia
- Phylum: Chordata
- Class: Actinopterygii
- Order: Cypriniformes
- Family: Danionidae
- Subfamily: Rasborinae
- Genus: Rasbora
- Species: R. baliensis

Binomial name
- Rasbora baliensis C. L. Hubbs & Brittan, 1954

Species of fish

Rasbora baliensis (translation: Bali Rasbora) is a species of freshwater ray-finned fish in the genus Rasbora. It is found only on Bali in Indonesia where it is restricted to the crater lake, Lake Bratan, which sits at 1231m above sea level. It can get up to 3.5 cm long. It is a benthopelagic omnivore.
