= Rasbora tubbi =

Conservation status
- Data Deficient (IUCN 3.1)

Scientific classification
- Kingdom: Animalia
- Phylum: Chordata
- Class: Actinopterygii
- Order: Cypriniformes
- Family: Danionidae
- Subfamily: Rasborinae
- Genus: Rasbora
- Species: R. tubbi

Binomial name
- Rasbora tubbi Brittan, 1954

Species of fish

Rasbora tubbi is a species of freshwater ray-finned fish in the genus Rasbora from northern Borneo.
