= Rasbora myersi =

Conservation status
- Least Concern (IUCN 3.1)

Scientific classification
- Kingdom: Animalia
- Phylum: Chordata
- Class: Actinopterygii
- Order: Cypriniformes
- Family: Danionidae
- Subfamily: Rasborinae
- Genus: Rasbora
- Species: R. myersi

Binomial name
- Rasbora myersi Brittan, 1954

Species of fish

Rasbora myersi is a species of freshwater ray-finned fish in the genus Rasbora from south-east Asia.
