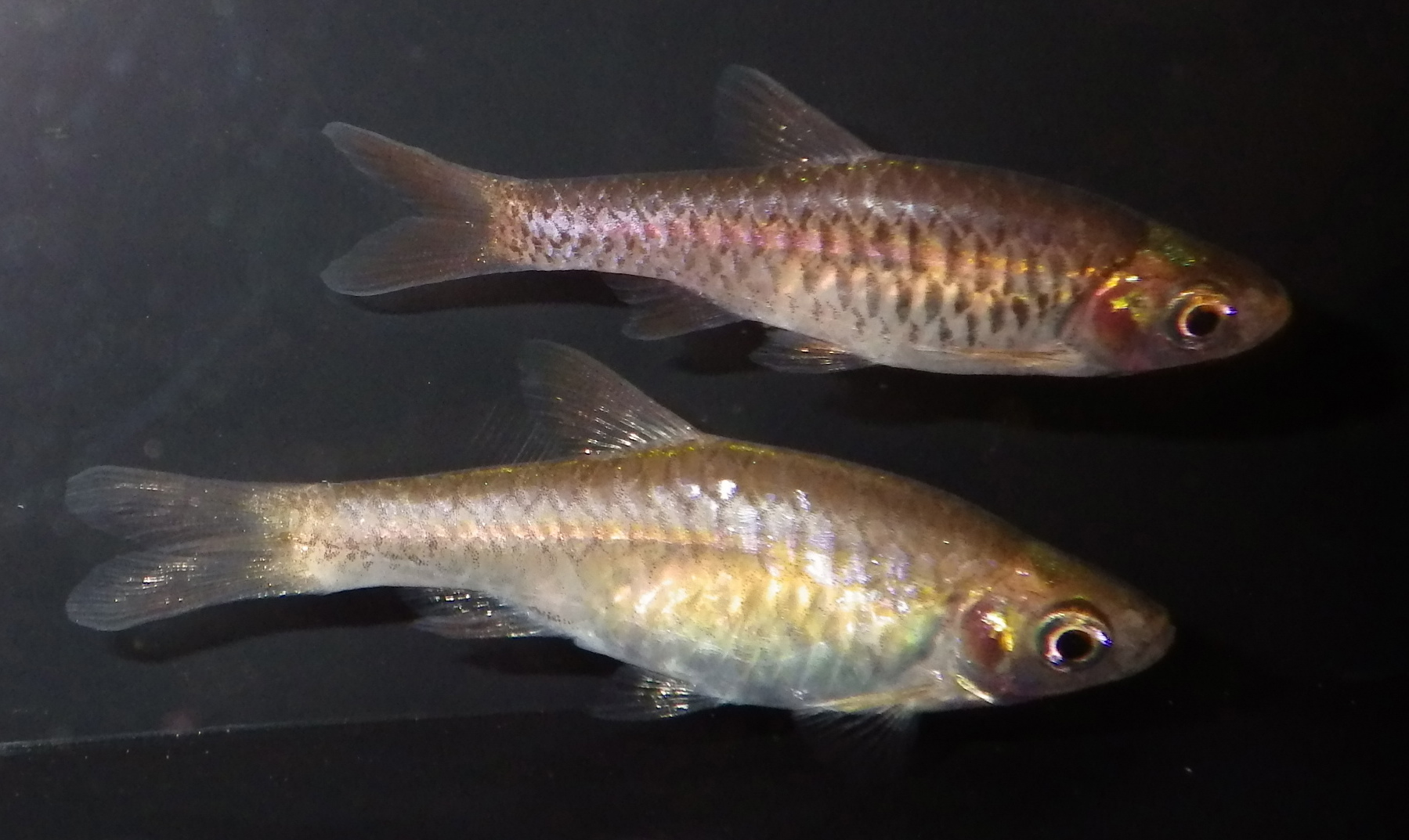

Conservation status
- Least Concern (IUCN 3.1)

Scientific classification
- Kingdom: Animalia
- Phylum: Chordata
- Class: Actinopterygii
- Order: Cypriniformes
- Family: Danionidae
- Subfamily: Rasborinae
- Genus: Rasbora
- Species: R. vulcanus

Binomial name
- Rasbora vulcanus H. H. Tan, 1999

= Rasbora vulcanus =

Species of fish

Rasbora vulcanus is a species of ray-finned fish in the genus Rasbora native to Sumatra.

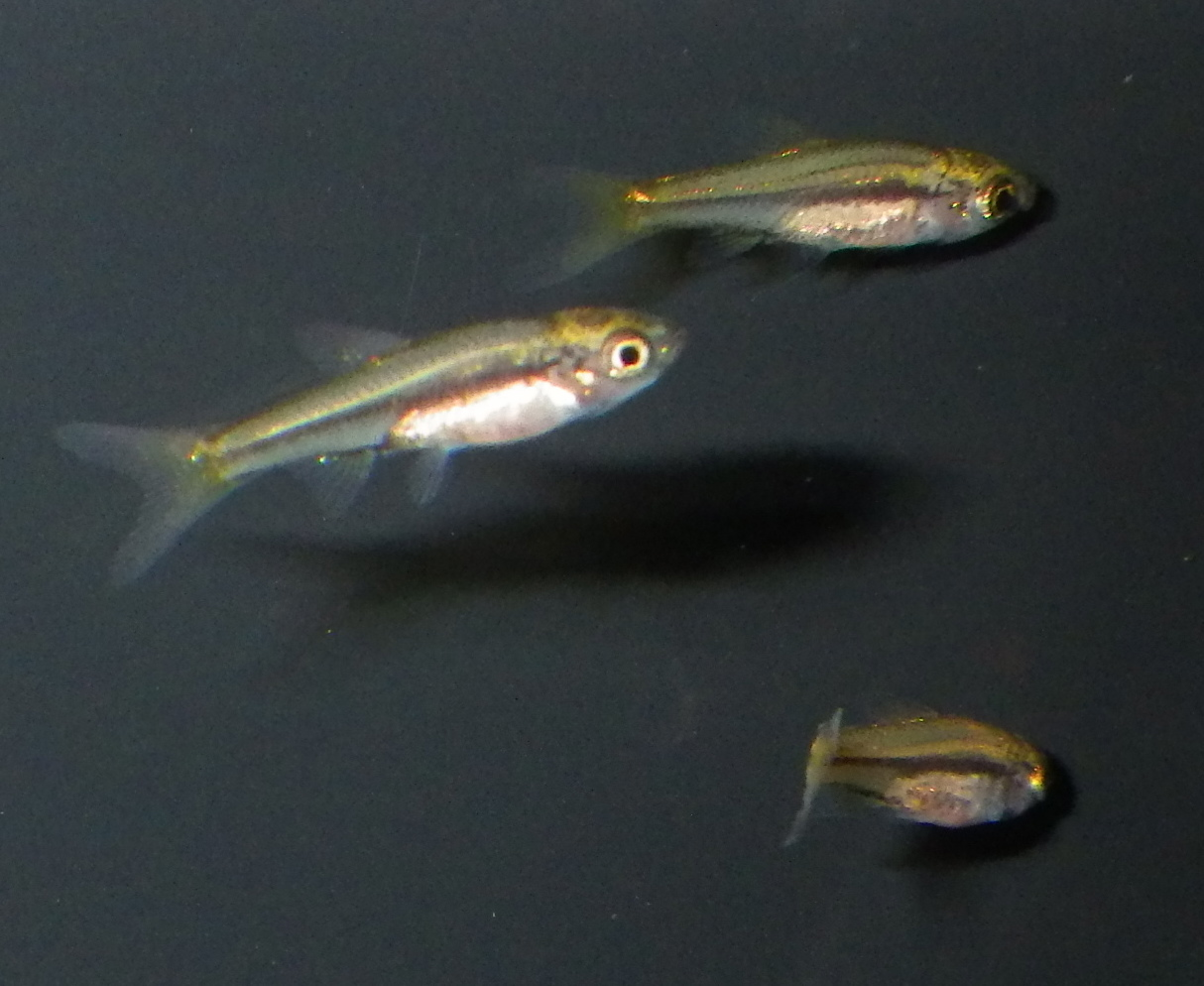
R. vulcanus juveniles
