= Rasbora laticlavia =

Conservation status
- Least Concern (IUCN 3.1)

Scientific classification
- Kingdom: Animalia
- Phylum: Chordata
- Class: Actinopterygii
- Order: Cypriniformes
- Family: Danionidae
- Subfamily: Rasborinae
- Genus: Rasbora
- Species: R. laticlavia

Binomial name
- Rasbora laticlavia Siebert & P. J. Richardson, 1997

Species of fish

Rasbora laticlavia is a species of freshwater ray-finned fish in the family Danionidae. It is endemic to Kalimantan (Borneo, Indonesia).

Rasbora laticlavia can grow to 11.2 cm (4.4 in) standard length.
