= Rasbora gerlachi =

Conservation status
- Data Deficient (IUCN 3.1)

Scientific classification
- Domain: Eukaryota
- Kingdom: Animalia
- Phylum: Chordata
- Class: Actinopterygii
- Order: Cypriniformes
- Family: Danionidae
- Subfamily: Rasborinae
- Genus: Rasbora
- Species: R. gerlachi

Binomial name
- Rasbora gerlachi C. G. E. Ahl, 1928

Species of fish

Rasbora gerlachi is a species of freshwater ray-finned fish in the genus Rasbora. This species is known only from its types which were erroneously said to have been collected in Cameroon, The actual range of this species is likely to be in southeast Asia, or it does not belong in the Asian genus Rasbora.
