= Rasbora vaillantii =

Conservation status
- Least Concern (IUCN 3.1)

Scientific classification
- Kingdom: Animalia
- Phylum: Chordata
- Class: Actinopterygii
- Order: Cypriniformes
- Family: Danionidae
- Subfamily: Rasborinae
- Genus: Rasbora
- Species: R. vaillantii

Binomial name
- Rasbora vaillantii Popta, 1905

Species of fish

Rasbora vaillantii is a species of ray-finned fish in the genus Rasbora which is found in Borneo.

== Etymology ==
While the name is not identified but it is almost certainly in honor of the French zoologist Léon Vaillant.
