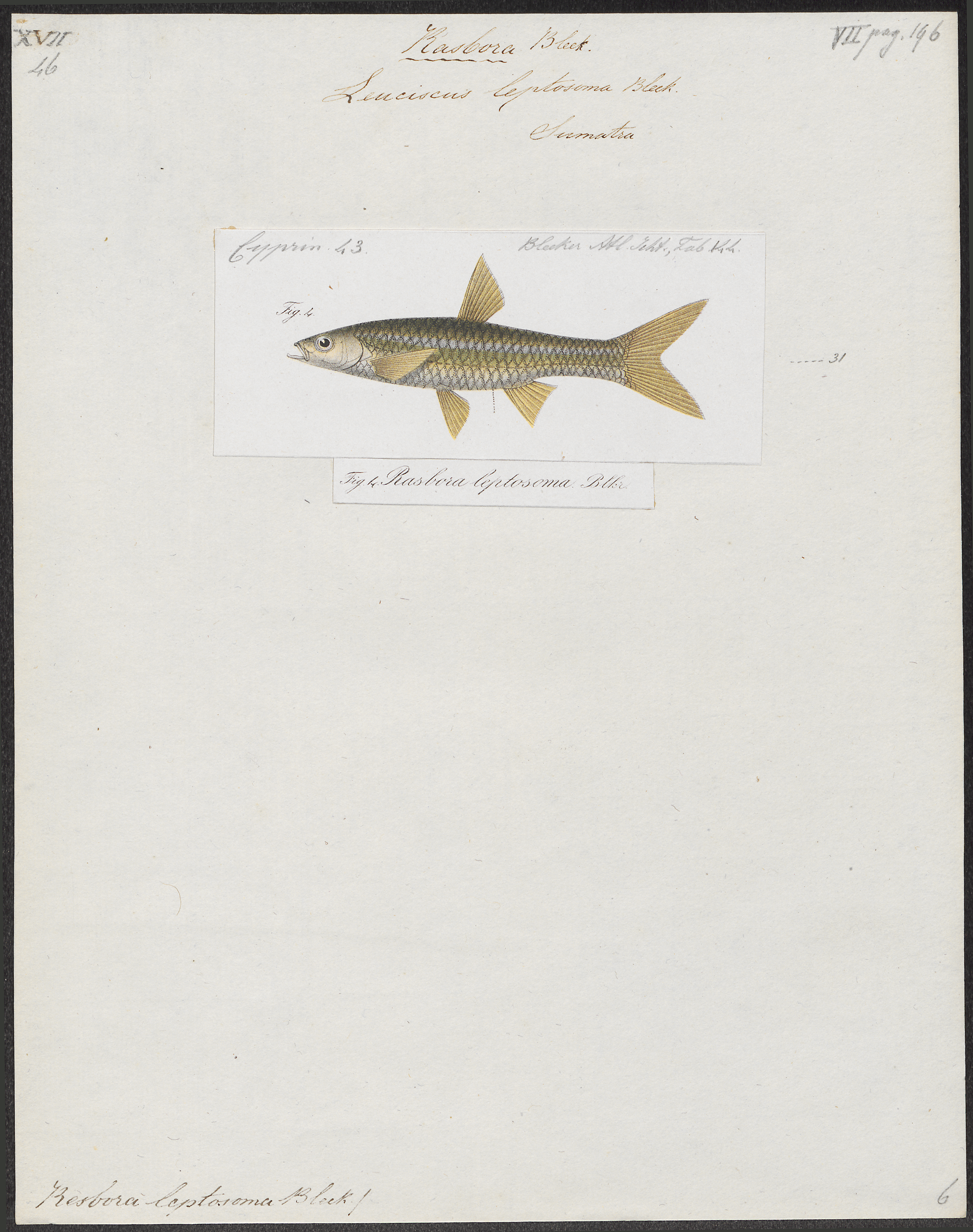

Conservation status
- Vulnerable (IUCN 3.1)

Scientific classification
- Kingdom: Animalia
- Phylum: Chordata
- Class: Actinopterygii
- Order: Cypriniformes
- Family: Danionidae
- Subfamily: Rasborinae
- Genus: Rasbora
- Species: R. leptosoma

Binomial name
- Rasbora leptosoma (Bleeker, 1855)

Synonyms
- Leuciscus leptosoma Bleeker, 1855

= Copperstripe rasbora =

Species of fish

The copperstripe rasbora (Rasbora leptosoma) is a species of ray-finned fish in the genus Rasbora from Sumatra, Indonesia.
