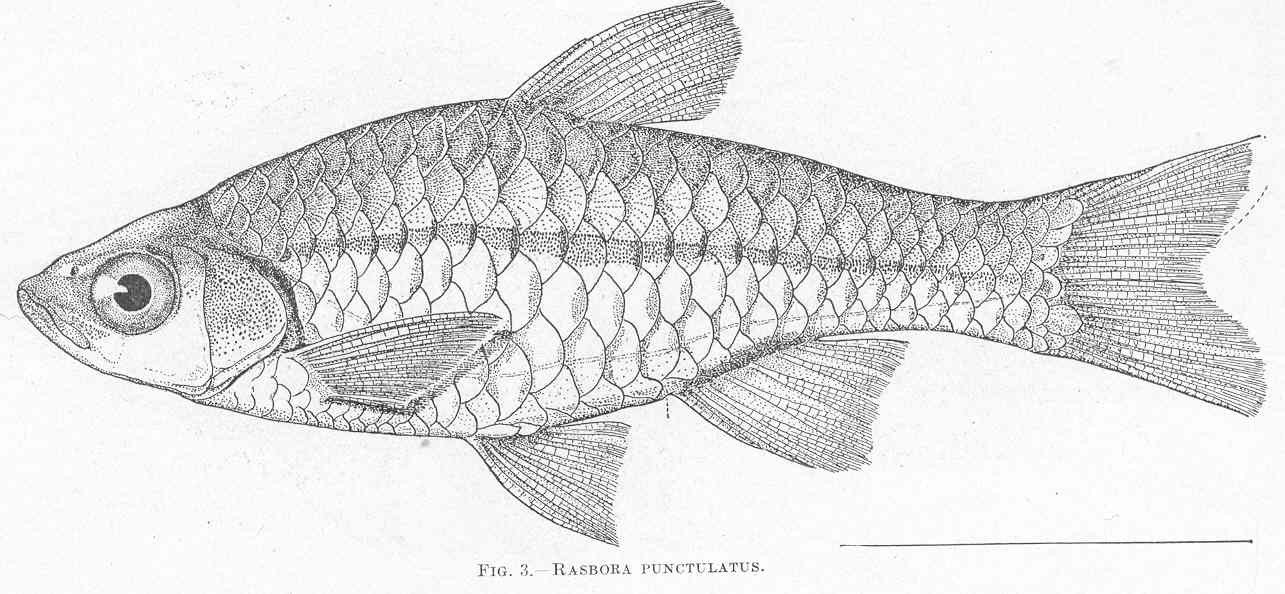

Conservation status
- Near Threatened (IUCN 3.1)

Scientific classification
- Kingdom: Animalia
- Phylum: Chordata
- Class: Actinopterygii
- Order: Cypriniformes
- Family: Danionidae
- Subfamily: Rasborinae
- Genus: Rasbora
- Species: R. philippina

Binomial name
- Rasbora philippina Günther, 1880

Synonyms
- Rasbora punctulatus Seale & Bean, 1907

= Mindanao rasbora =

Species of fish

Mindanao rasbora (Rasbora philippina) is a species of ray-finned fish in the genus Rasbora endemic to Mindanao, Philippines.
