= Rasbora calliura =

Conservation status
- Near Threatened (IUCN 3.1)

Scientific classification
- Kingdom: Animalia
- Phylum: Chordata
- Class: Actinopterygii
- Order: Cypriniformes
- Family: Danionidae
- Genus: Rasbora
- Species: R. calliura

Binomial name
- Rasbora calliura Boulenger, 1894

Species of fish

Rasbora calliura is a species of freshwater ray-finned fish belonging to the genus Rasbora within the subfamily Rasborinae of the family Danionidae. This species is restricted to northwestern Borneo in Malaysia.
