= Kalbar rasbora =

Conservation status
- Least Concern (IUCN 3.1)

Scientific classification
- Kingdom: Animalia
- Phylum: Chordata
- Class: Actinopterygii
- Order: Cypriniformes
- Family: Danionidae
- Subfamily: Rasborinae
- Genus: Rasbora
- Species: R. kalbarensis

Binomial name
- Rasbora kalbarensis Kottelat, 1991

Species of fish

The Kalbar rasbora (Rasbora kalbarensis) is a species of ray-finned fish in the genus Rasbora. It is known from forest streams and clear black waters of western Borneo. It grows to a length of 2.5 cm (0.98 in) SL.
