= Rasbora amplistriga =

Conservation status
- Least Concern (IUCN 3.1)

Scientific classification
- Kingdom: Animalia
- Phylum: Chordata
- Class: Actinopterygii
- Order: Cypriniformes
- Family: Danionidae
- Subfamily: Rasborinae
- Genus: Rasbora
- Species: R. amplistriga

Binomial name
- Rasbora amplistriga Kottelat, 2000

Species of fish

Rasbora amplistriga is a species of ray-finned fish in the genus Rasbora. It inhabits forest streams in the Mekong basin south of Khone Falls as well as coastal basins of south-eastern Thailand.
