= Rasbora subtilis =

Conservation status
- Least Concern (IUCN 3.1)

Scientific classification
- Kingdom: Animalia
- Phylum: Chordata
- Class: Actinopterygii
- Order: Cypriniformes
- Family: Danionidae
- Subfamily: Rasborinae
- Genus: Rasbora
- Species: R. subtilis

Binomial name
- Rasbora subtilis T. R. Roberts, 1989

Species of fish

Rasbora subtilis is a species of ray-finned fish in the genus Rasbora. It occurs only in the Kapuas River in the Indonesian province of West Kalimantan.
