= Rasbora labiosa =

Conservation status
- Least Concern (IUCN 3.1)

Scientific classification
- Kingdom: Animalia
- Phylum: Chordata
- Class: Actinopterygii
- Order: Cypriniformes
- Family: Danionidae
- Subfamily: Rasborinae
- Genus: Rasbora
- Species: R. labiosa

Binomial name
- Rasbora labiosa Mukerji, 1935

Synonyms
- Parluciosoma labiosa (Mukerji, 1935)

Species of fish

Rasbora labiosa, the slender rasbora, lives in rivers and streams in parts of India. It was first described from the Darna River in the upper Godavari River Basin
