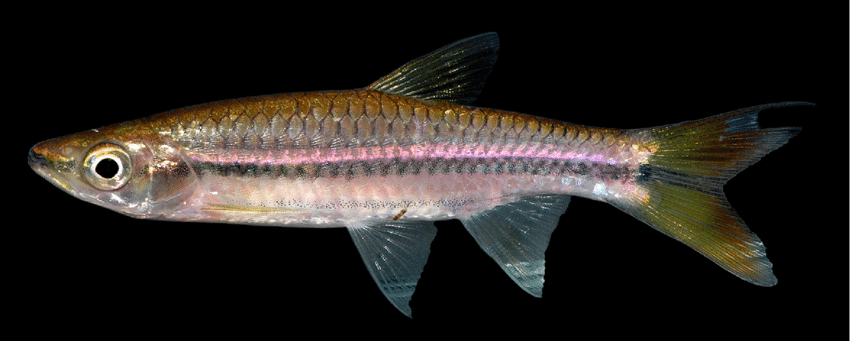

Scientific classification
- Kingdom: Animalia
- Phylum: Chordata
- Class: Actinopterygii
- Order: Cypriniformes
- Family: Danionidae
- Genus: Rasbora
- Species: R. marinae

Binomial name
- Rasbora marinae Kottelat & Heok Hui Tan 2020

= Rasbora marinae =

Marina's rasbora

Species of cyprinid fish

Rasbora marinae, or Marina's rasbora, is a recently described species of cyprinid fish in the genus Rasbora, in 2020. Several Rasbora specimens from 1996 - 2005, resembling R. cephalotaenia were examined and found to be a new species, due to their unique body pattern in adulthood.

== Etymology ==
Named after Marina Wong (Brunei Museum), in honor of her contributions to Southeast Asia's natural history and her aid to the group who recorded the species.

== Description ==
Rasbora marinae is closely related to R. cephalotaenia, and due to their overlapping distribution and same habitat preference, it is hard to tell the two species apart.

Both R. marinae and R.cephalotaenia have a mid-lateral black or dark brown stripe running from the tip of the snout to the end of the median caudal fin rays and rows of black spots on the flank, including two rows along the edges of the mid lateral stripe. R. marinae's distinguishing trait is that it retains the mid-lateral stripe up to adulthood (unlike R. cephalotaenia), and the absence of a black mark at the base of the caudal fin.

Can get up to 13.5 cm (5.3 inches) in total body length.

== Distribution ==
It is currently only known from Brunei and the northern part of the State of Sarawak, Malaysia.

== Habitat ==
It inhabits blackwater habitats like peat swamps, acidic pools, and streams with submerged vegetation.
