= Rasbora kottelati =

Conservation status
- Least Concern (IUCN 3.1)

Scientific classification
- Kingdom: Animalia
- Phylum: Chordata
- Class: Actinopterygii
- Order: Cypriniformes
- Family: Danionidae
- Subfamily: Rasborinae
- Genus: Rasbora
- Species: R. kottelati

Binomial name
- Rasbora kottelati K. K. P. Lim, 1995

Species of fish

Rasbora kottelati is a species of ray-finned fish in the family Danionidae. It is endemic to northwestern Borneo and occurs in both Sarawak (Malaysia) and Brunei. It is a pelagic species associated with blackwater habitats in peat swamp forests. It can grow to 7 cm (2.8 in) standard length.

== Etymology ==
The fish is named in honor of Swiss ichthyologist Maurice Kottelat.
