= Rasbora ornata =

Conservation status
- Vulnerable (IUCN 3.1)

Scientific classification
- Kingdom: Animalia
- Phylum: Chordata
- Class: Actinopterygii
- Order: Cypriniformes
- Family: Danionidae
- Subfamily: Rasborinae
- Genus: Rasbora
- Species: R. ornata

Binomial name
- Rasbora ornata Vishwanath & Laisram, 2005

Species of fish

Rasbora ornata is a species of cyprinid fish endemic to Manipur in India where it occurs in two rivers, the Chatrickong River and Lokchao River, both tributaries of the Yu River. It is threatened by habitat destruction and is traded for the aquarium hobby.
