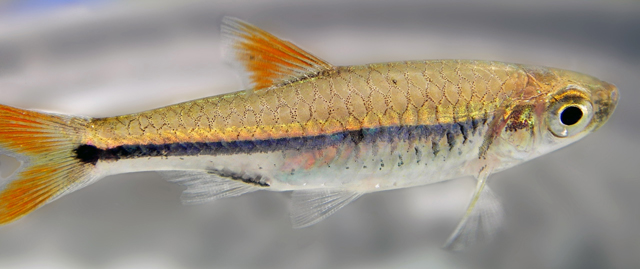

Scientific classification
- Domain: Eukaryota
- Kingdom: Animalia
- Phylum: Chordata
- Class: Actinopterygii
- Order: Cypriniformes
- Family: Danionidae
- Genus: Rasbora
- Species: R. api

Binomial name
- Rasbora api Lumbantobing, 2010

= Rasbora api =

Species of fish

Rasbora api is a species of cyprinid fish in the genus Rasbora. It inhabits the Kluet, Alas, Aek Batugarigis, Aek Sibundung, Batang Lumut, and Batang Toru rivers in Sumatra.

Discovered by Daniel Natanael Lumbantobing, an Indonesian doctoral student in the Department of Biological Sciences of The George Washington University, United States.

== Etymology ==
The name 'api' meaning fire in Indonesian, was chosen due to the fire orange color of the fishes caudal and dorsal fin. A pigmentation pattern appearing like fire when the fish is alive.

== Description ==
its distinguishing feature from other members of its group, Rasbora trifasciata is by the black lateral line running across its flank and the stout and tall cephalic tubercles of males, meanwhile Rasbora nodulosa cephalic tubercles are smaller.
