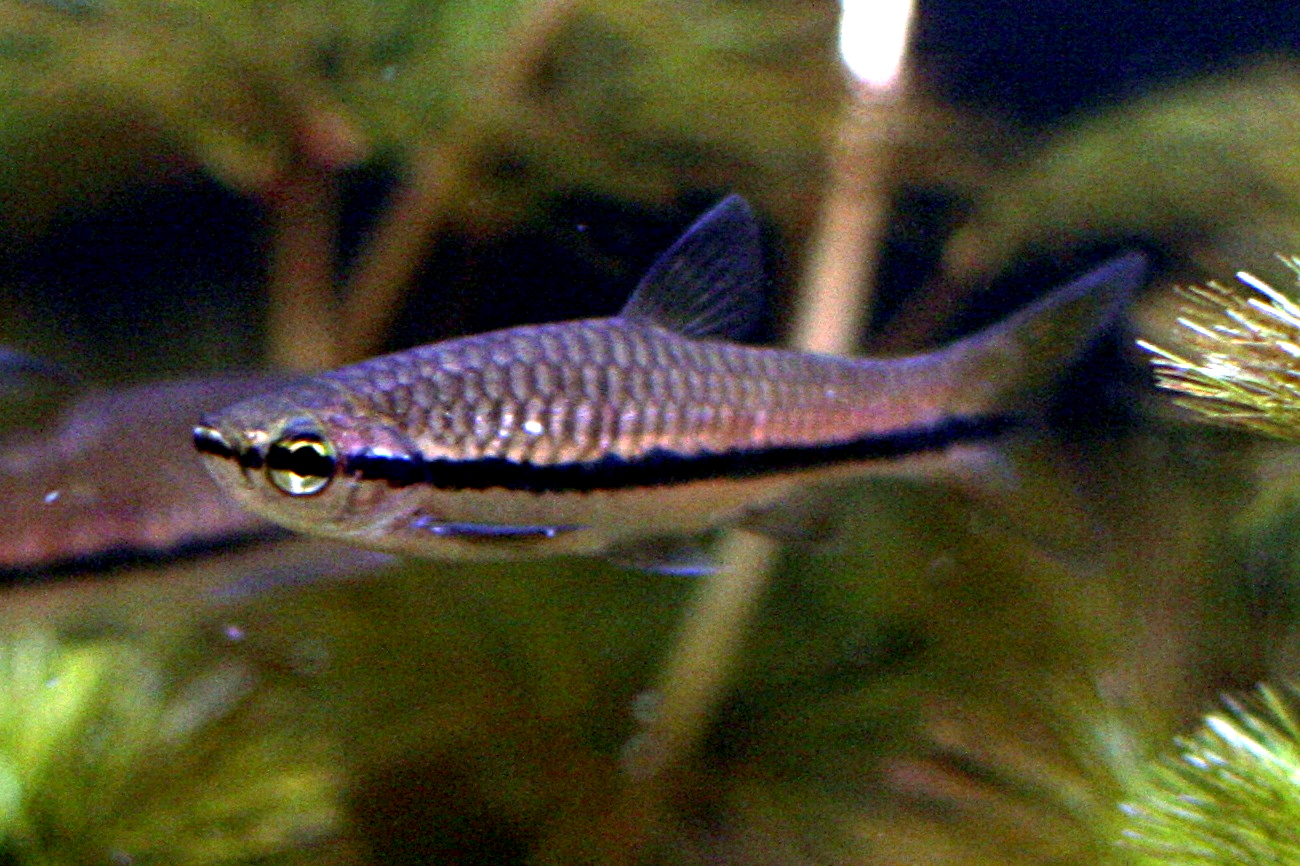

Conservation status
- Least Concern (IUCN 3.1)

Scientific classification
- Kingdom: Animalia
- Phylum: Chordata
- Class: Actinopterygii
- Order: Cypriniformes
- Family: Danionidae
- Subfamily: Rasborinae
- Genus: Rasbora
- Species: R. einthovenii

Binomial name
- Rasbora einthovenii (Bleeker, 1851)

Synonyms
- Leuciscus einthovenii Bleeker, 1851; Rasbora vegae Rendahl, 1926; Rasbora labuana Whitley, 1958

= Brilliant rasbora =

Species of fish

The brilliant rasbora (Rasbora einthovenii) is a species of ray-finned fish in the genus Rasbora. It is found in the Malay Peninsula(Including southern Thailand) and Borneo and Indonesia Sumatra,Bangka. Adults can grow up to 5 cm (2 inches)
