= Rasbora kobonensis =

Scientific classification
- Domain: Eukaryota
- Kingdom: Animalia
- Phylum: Chordata
- Class: Actinopterygii
- Order: Cypriniformes
- Family: Danionidae
- Genus: Rasbora
- Species: R. kobonensis

Binomial name
- Rasbora kobonensis B. L. Chaudhuri, 1913

Species of fish

Rasbora kobonensis is a species of freshwater ray-finned fish in the genus Rasbora. It is endemic to India.
