= Rasbora rubrodorsalis =

Conservation status
- Least Concern (IUCN 3.1)

Scientific classification
- Kingdom: Animalia
- Phylum: Chordata
- Class: Actinopterygii
- Order: Cypriniformes
- Family: Danionidae
- Subfamily: Rasborinae
- Genus: Rasbora
- Species: R. rubrodorsalis

Binomial name
- Rasbora rubrodorsalis Donoso-Büchner & J. Schmidt, 1997

Species of fish

Rasbora rubrodorsalis is a species of cyprinid fish native to southeast Asia where it occurs in the basins of the Mekong, Chao Phraya and Mae Klong rivers. It prefers areas of slow-flowing streams and ponds and ditches. This species can reach a length of 3.3 centimetres (1.3 in) SL.
