= Rasbora rheophila =

Conservation status
- Least Concern (IUCN 3.1)

Scientific classification
- Kingdom: Animalia
- Phylum: Chordata
- Class: Actinopterygii
- Order: Cypriniformes
- Family: Danionidae
- Genus: Rasbora
- Species: R. rheophila

Binomial name
- Rasbora rheophila Kottelat, 2012

Species of fish

Rasbora rheophila is a species of ray-finned fish in the genus Rasbora. It is endemic to the Sungai Pangakatan in Sabah.
