= Rasbora dorsinotata =

Scientific classification
- Domain: Eukaryota
- Kingdom: Animalia
- Phylum: Chordata
- Class: Actinopterygii
- Order: Cypriniformes
- Family: Danionidae
- Subfamily: Rasborinae
- Genus: Rasbora
- Species: R. dorsinotata

Binomial name
- Rasbora dorsinotata Kottelat, 1988

Species of fish

Rasbora dorsinotata is a species of ray-finned fish in the genus Rasbora. This species is found in the Chao Phraya and Mekong basins in southeastern Asia.
