= Rasbora atranus =

Conservation status
- Data Deficient (IUCN 3.1)

Scientific classification
- Kingdom: Animalia
- Phylum: Chordata
- Class: Actinopterygii
- Order: Cypriniformes
- Family: Danionidae
- Genus: Rasbora
- Species: R. atranus

Binomial name
- Rasbora atranus Kottelat & H. H. Tan, 2011

Species of fish

Rasbora atranus is a species of freshwater ray-finned fish in the genus Rasbora. It is found in Borneo in Indonesia.
