= Rasbora notura =

Conservation status
- Least Concern (IUCN 3.1)

Scientific classification
- Kingdom: Animalia
- Phylum: Chordata
- Class: Actinopterygii
- Order: Cypriniformes
- Family: Danionidae
- Subfamily: Rasborinae
- Genus: Rasbora
- Species: R. notura

Binomial name
- Rasbora notura Kottelat, 2005

Species of fish

Rasbora notura is a species of freshwater ray-finned fish in the genus Rasbora from the Terengganu River system in Malaysia.
