= Kottelat rasbora =

Scientific classification
- Domain: Eukaryota
- Kingdom: Animalia
- Phylum: Chordata
- Class: Actinopterygii
- Order: Cypriniformes
- Family: Danionidae
- Subfamily: Rasborinae
- Genus: Rasbora
- Species: R. hobelmani

Binomial name
- Rasbora hobelmani Kottelat, 1984

Species of fish

The Kottelat rasbora (Rasbora hobelmani) is a species of ray-finned fish in the genus Rasbora. It is found in Asia - eastern Myanmar, northern Thailand and the Mekong basin.

== Etymology ==
The fish is named in honor of Paul Hobelman, a teacher of English, in Thailand.
