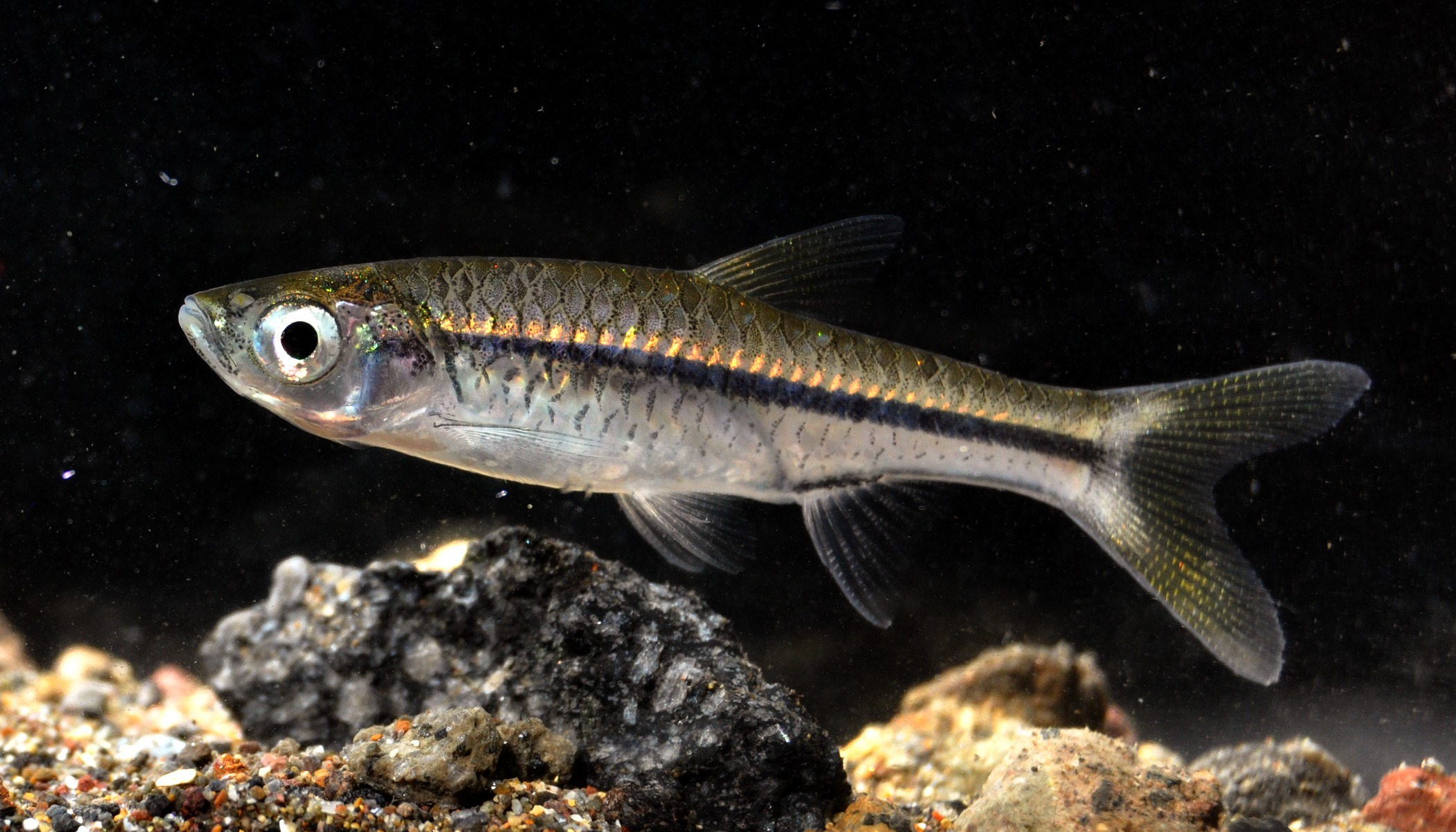
- Silver rasbora (Rasbora argyrotaenia)

Scientific classification
- Kingdom: Animalia
- Phylum: Chordata
- Class: Actinopterygii
- Order: Cypriniformes
- Family: Danionidae
- Subfamily: Rasborinae
- Genus: Rasbora; Bleeker, 1859

Type species
- Rasbora cephalotaenia Bleeker, 1852

Species
- over 80, see text

Synonyms
- Parluciosoma Howes, 1980

= Rasbora =

Genus of fishes

Rasbora is a genus of fish in the family Danionidae. They are native to freshwater habitats in South and Southeast Asia, as well as southeast China. A single species, Rasbora gerlachi, is only known from an old specimen that reputedly originated from Africa (Cameroon), but this locality is considered doubtful. They are small, up to 17 cm (6.7 in) long, although most species do not surpass 10 cm (4 in) and many have a dark horizontal stripe.

Several species are regularly kept in aquariums. As a common English name, "rasbora" is used for many species in the genus Rasbora, as well as several species in genera Brevibora, Boraras, Megarasbora, Metzia, Microdevario, Microrasbora, Rasboroides, Rasbosoma, Sawbwa, Trigonopoma and Trigonostigma. Some of these related genera were included in the genus Rasbora in the past. In a 2007 analysis, Rasbora was found to not be a monophyletic assemblage. However Boraras and Trigonostigma were determined to be monophyletic.

== Species ==
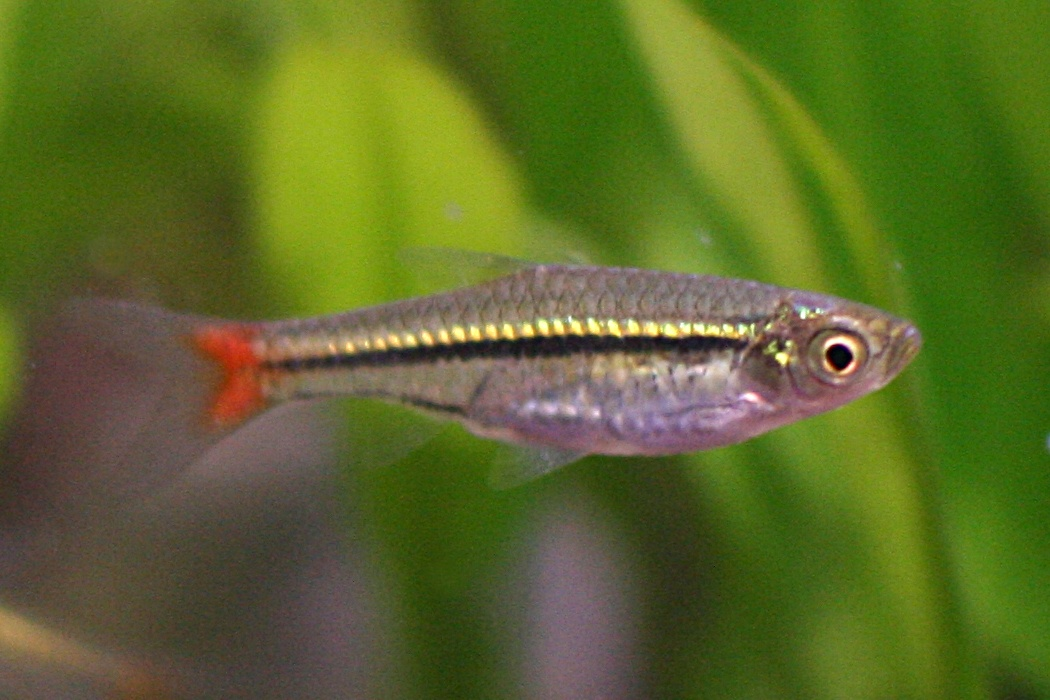
Rasbora borapetensis

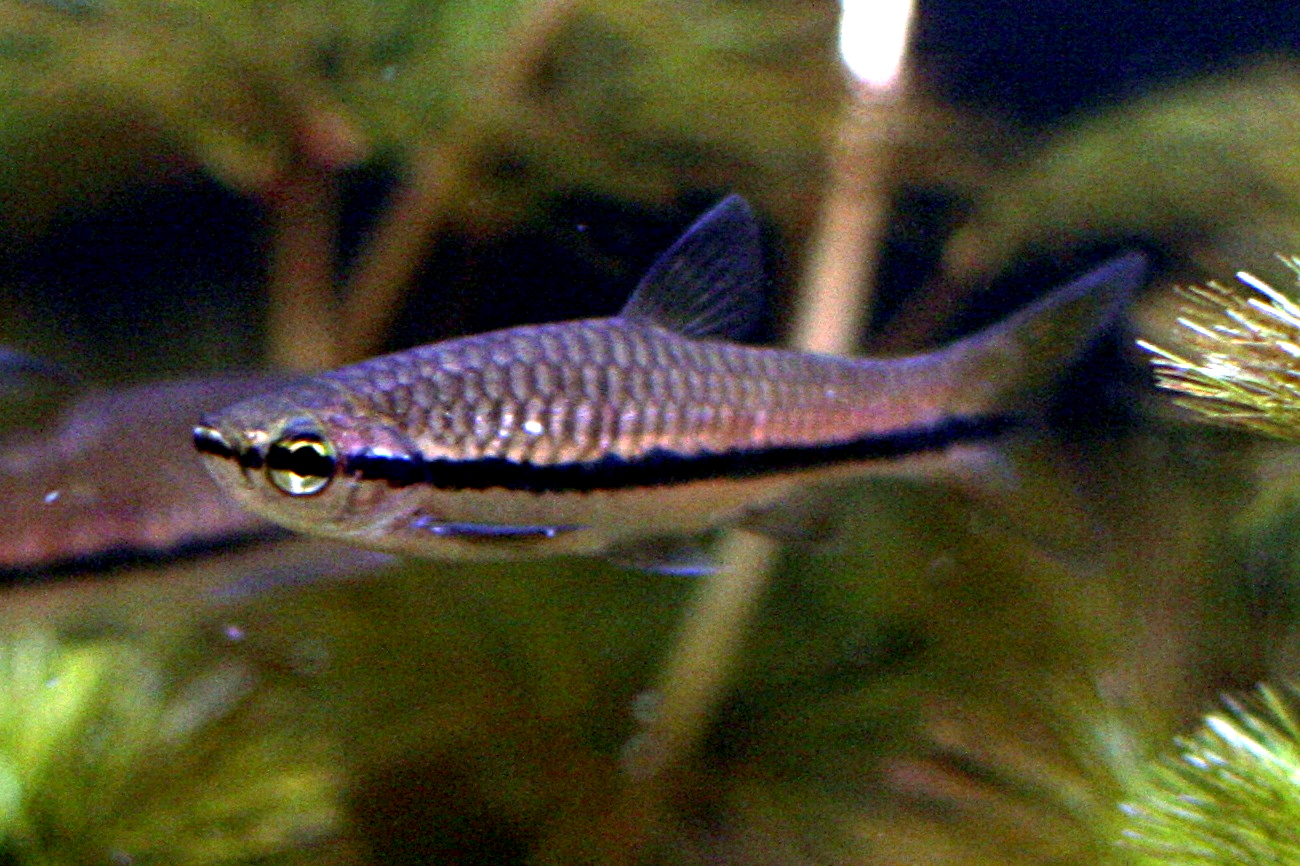
Rasbora einthovenii

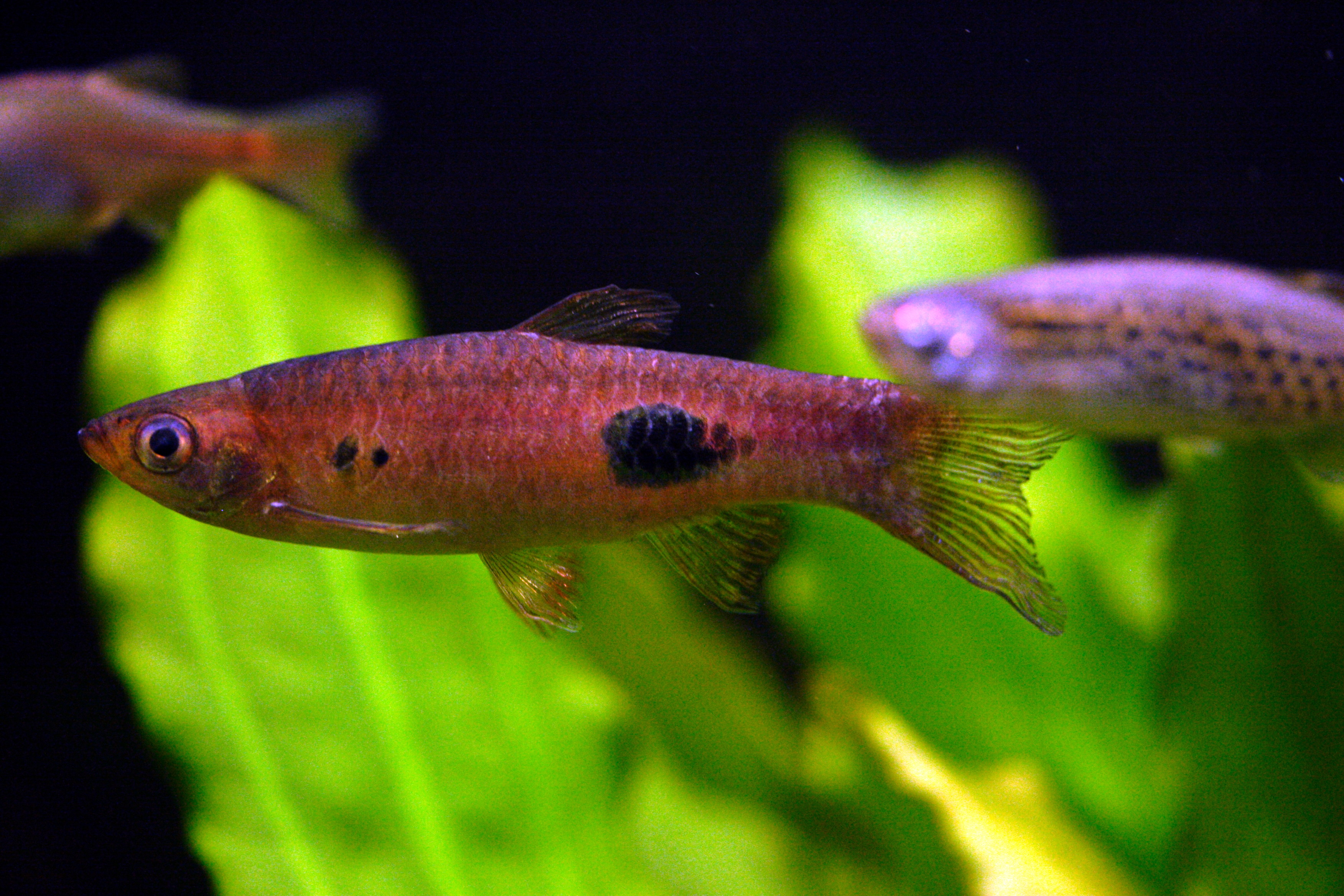
Rasbora kalochroma

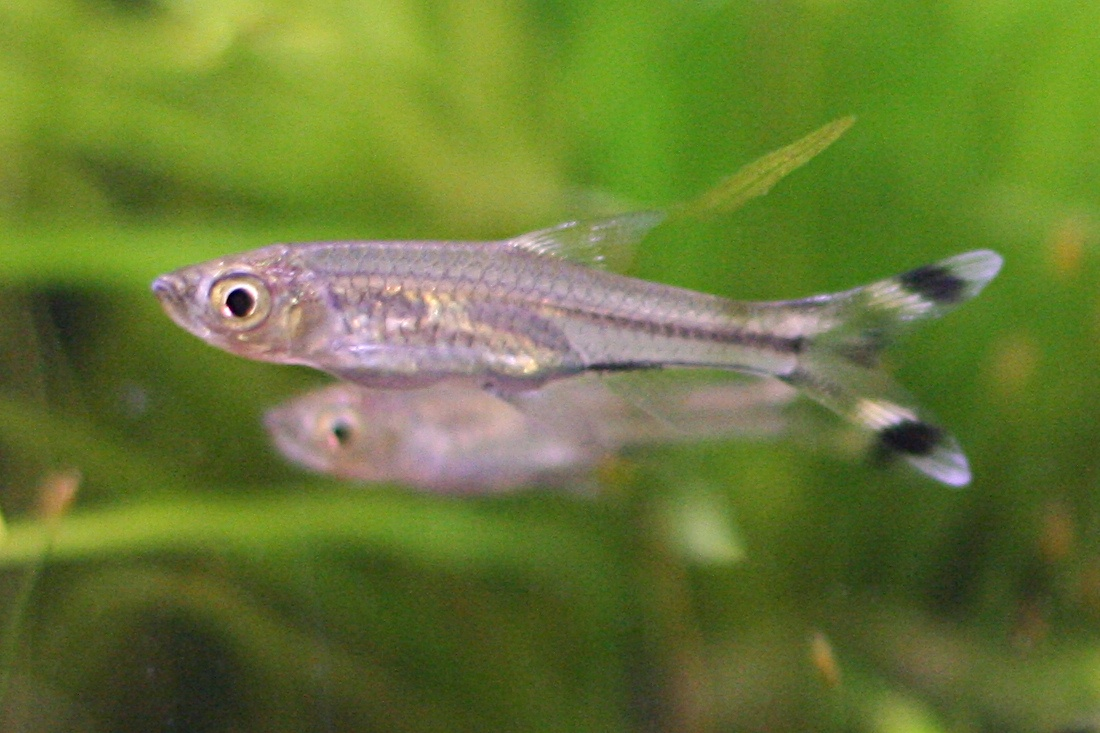
Rasbora trilineata

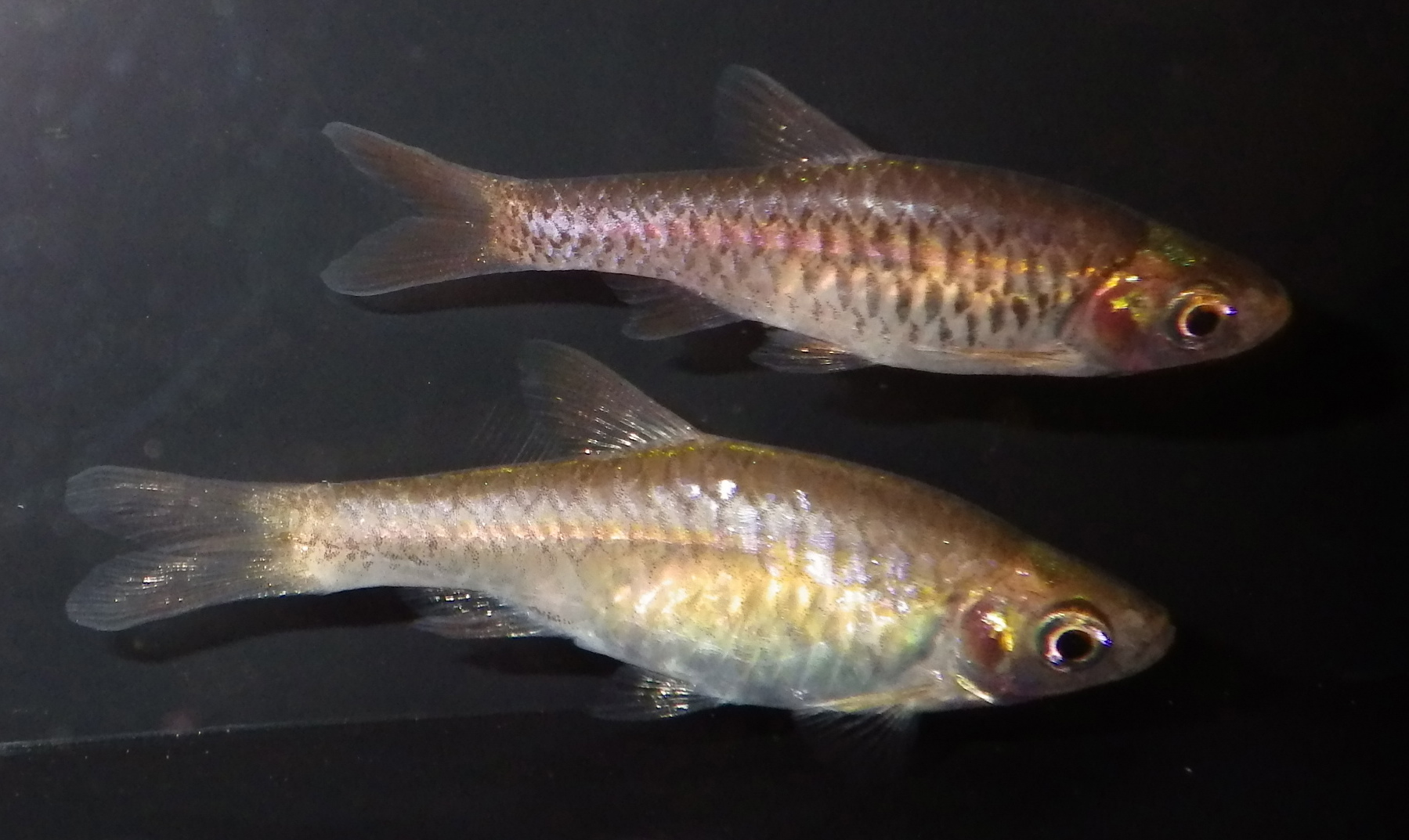
Rasbora vulcanus

Rasbora has the following valid species classified within it:

- Rasbora adisi Sudasinghe, Pethiyagoda, Hettiarachchige, Ranasinghe, Raghavan et al., 2020
- Rasbora amplistriga Kottelat, 2000
- Rasbora api Lumbantobing, 2010
- Rasbora aprotaenia Hubbs & Brittan, 1954
- Rasbora argyrotaenia (Bleeker, 1849) (Silver rasbora)
- Rasbora armitagei Silva, Maduwage & Pethiyagoda, 2010 (Armitage's rasbora)
- Rasbora arundinata Lumbantobing, 2014
- Rasbora ataenia Plamoottil, 2016
- Rasbora atranus Kottelat & Tan, 2011
- Rasbora atridorsalis Kottelat & X. L. Chu, 1988
- Rasbora aurotaenia Tirant, 1885 (pale rasbora)
- Rasbora baliensis Hubbs & Brittan, 1954
- Rasbora bankanensis (Bleeker, 1853)
- Rasbora bindumatoga Lumbantobing, 2014
- Rasbora borapetensis Smith, 1934 (Blackline rasbora)
- Rasbora borneensis Bleeker, 1860
- Rasbora bunguranensis Brittan, 1951
- Rasbora calliura Boulenger, 1894
- Rasbora caudimaculata Volz, 1903 (Greater scissortail)
- Rasbora caverii (Jerdon, 1849)
- Rasbora cephalotaenia (Bleeker, 1852)
- Rasbora chrysotaenia Arnold, 1936 (Goldstripe rasbora)
- Rasbora cryptica Kottelat & Tan, 2012
- Rasbora dandia (Valenciennes, 1844)
- Rasbora daniconius (Hamilton, 1822) (Slender rasbora)
- Rasbora dies Kottelat, 2008
- Rasbora dorsinotata Kottelat, 1988
- Rasbora dusonensis (Bleeker, 1850) (Rosefin rasbora)
- Rasbora einthovenii (Bleeker, 1851) (Brilliant rasbora)
- Rasbora elegans Volz, 1903 (Twospot rasbora)
- Rasbora ennealepis Roberts 1989
- Rasbora everetti Boulenger, 1895
- Rasbora gerlachi Ahl, 1928
- Rasbora haru Lumbantobing, 2014
- Rasbora hobelmani Kottelat, 1984. (Kottelat rasbora)
- Rasbora hosii Boulenger, 1895
- Rasbora hubbsi Brittan 1954
- Rasbora jacobsoni Weber & de Beaufort, 1916
- Rasbora johannae Siebert & Guiry, 1996
- Rasbora kalbarensis Kottelat, 1991 (Kalbar rasbora)
- Rasbora kalochroma (Bleeker, 1851) (Clown rasbora)
- Rasbora kluetensis Lumbantobing, 2010
- Rasbora kobonensis Chaudhuri, 1913
- Rasbora kottelati Lim, 1995
- Rasbora labiosa Mukerji, 1935
- Rasbora lacrimula Hadiaty & Kottelat, 2009
- Rasbora lateristriata (Bleeker, 1854) (Yellow rasbora)
- Rasbora laticlavia Siebert & P. J. Richardson, 1997
- Rasbora leptosoma (Bleeker, 1855) (Copperstripe rasbora)
- Rasbora maninjau Lumbantobing, 2014
- Rasbora marinae Tan & Kottelat, 2020
- Rasbora meinkeni de Beaufort, 1929
- Rasbora microcephala (Jerdon, 1849)
- Rasbora myersi Brittan, 1954
- Rasbora naggsi Silva, Maduwage & Pethiyagoda, 2010
- Rasbora neilgherriensis Day 1867
- Rasbora nematotaenia Hubbs & Brittan, 1954
- Rasbora nodulosa Lumbantobing, 2010
- Rasbora notura Kottelat, 2005
- Rasbora ornata Vishwanath & Laisram, 2005
- Rasbora patrickyapi Tan, 2009
- Rasbora paucisqualis Ahl, 1935 (Largescaled rasbora)
- Rasbora paviana Tirant, 1885 (Sidestripe rasbora)
- Rasbora philippina Günther, 1880 (Mindanao rasbora)
- Rasbora pycnopeza C. L. Wilkinson & Tan, 2018
- Rasbora rasbora (Hamilton, 1822) (Gangetic scissortail rasbora)
- Rasbora reticulata Weber & de Beaufort, 1915
- Rasbora rheophila Kottelat, 2012
- Rasbora rubrodorsalis Donoso-Büchner & Jü. Schmidt, 1997
- Rasbora rutteni Weber & de Beaufort, 1916
- Rasbora sarawakensis Brittan, 1951
- Rasbora semilineata Weber & de Beaufort, 1916
- Rasbora septentrionalis Kottelat, 2000
- Rasbora simonbirchi Britz & Tan, 2018
- Rasbora spilotaenia Hubbs & Brittan, 1954
- Rasbora steineri Nichols & Pope, 1927 (Chinese rasbora)
- Rasbora subtilis Roberts, 1989
- Rasbora sumatrana (Bleeker, 1852)
- Rasbora tawarensis Weber & de Beaufort, 1916
- Rasbora tobana Ahl, 1934
- Rasbora tornieri Ahl, 1922 (Yellowtail rasbora)
- Rasbora trifasciata Popta, 1905
- Rasbora trilineata Steindachner, 1870 (Three-lined rasbora)
- Rasbora truncata Lumbantobing, 2010
- Rasbora tubbi Brittan, 1954
- Rasbora tuberculata Kottelat, 1995
- Rasbora vaillantii Popta, 1905
- Rasbora volzii Popta, 1905
- Rasbora vulcanus Tan, 1999
- Rasbora vulgaris Duncker, 1904 (Blacktip rasbora)
- Rasbora wilpita Kottelat & Pethiyagoda, 1991 (Wilpita rasbora)
