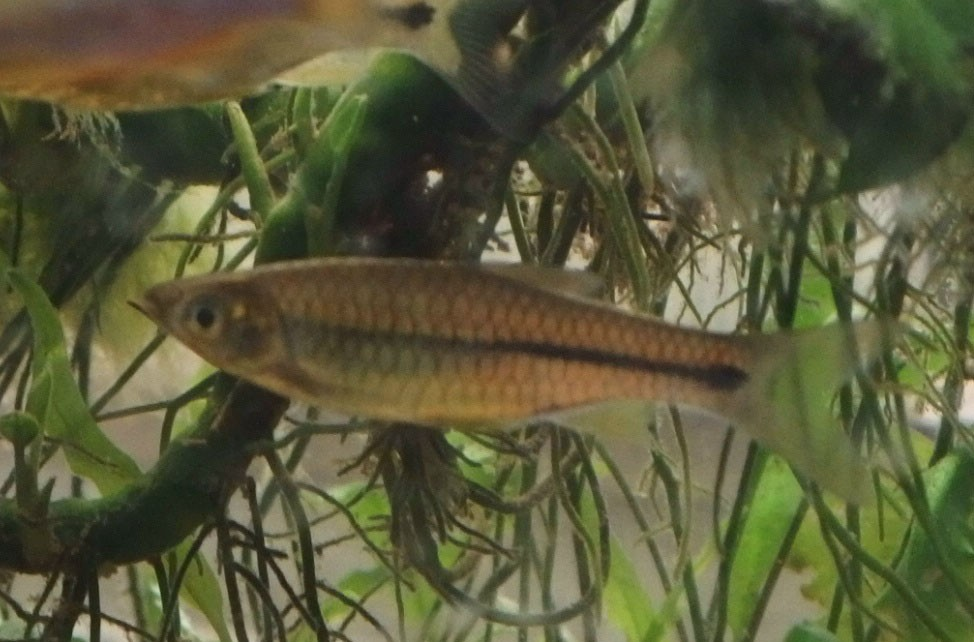
- Rasbora paviana in aquarium

Conservation status
- Least Concern (IUCN 3.1)

Scientific classification
- Kingdom: Animalia
- Phylum: Chordata
- Class: Actinopterygii
- Order: Cypriniformes
- Family: Danionidae
- Subfamily: Rasborinae
- Genus: Rasbora
- Species: R. paviana

Binomial name
- Rasbora paviana Tirant, 1885

Synonyms
- Rasbora cromiei Fowler, 1937; Rasbora paviei Chevey, 1932

= Sidestripe rasbora =

Species of fish

The sidestripe rasbora (Rasbora paviana) is a species of ray-finned fish in the genus Rasbora from the continental Southeast Asia. The epithet paviana does not derive from the similar sounding German word for baboon, but from Auguste Pavie.
