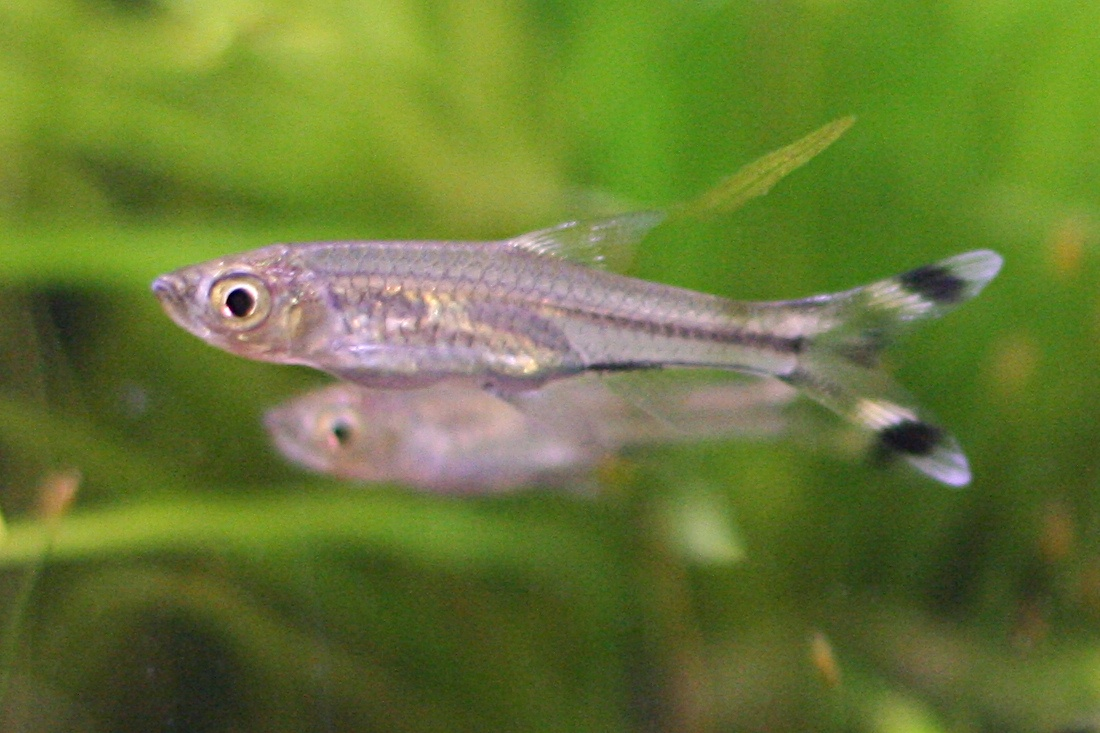

Conservation status
- Least Concern (IUCN 3.1)

Scientific classification
- Kingdom: Animalia
- Phylum: Chordata
- Class: Actinopterygii
- Order: Cypriniformes
- Family: Danionidae
- Subfamily: Rasborinae
- Genus: Rasbora
- Species: R. trilineata

Binomial name
- Rasbora trilineata Steindachner, 1870

= Rasbora trilineata =

Species of fish

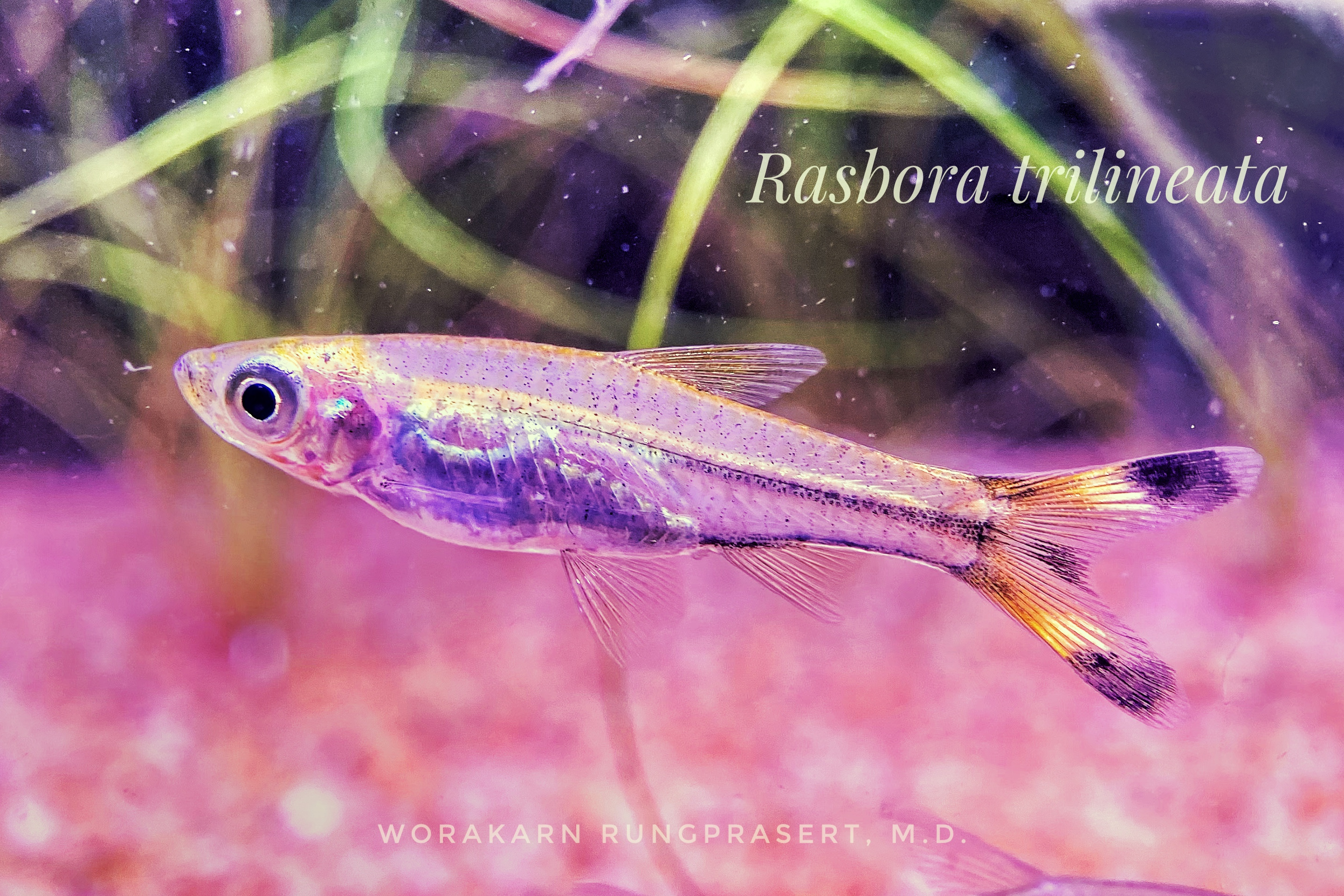

Rasbora trilineata is a species of ray-finned fish in the genus Rasbora. Common names include scissortail rasbora and three-lined rasbora. It comes from Southeast Asia. Its length is up to 15 cm (6").

== Aquarium ==
In the wild, Rasbora trilineata is an omnivore. It adapts easily to normal aquarium foods.
