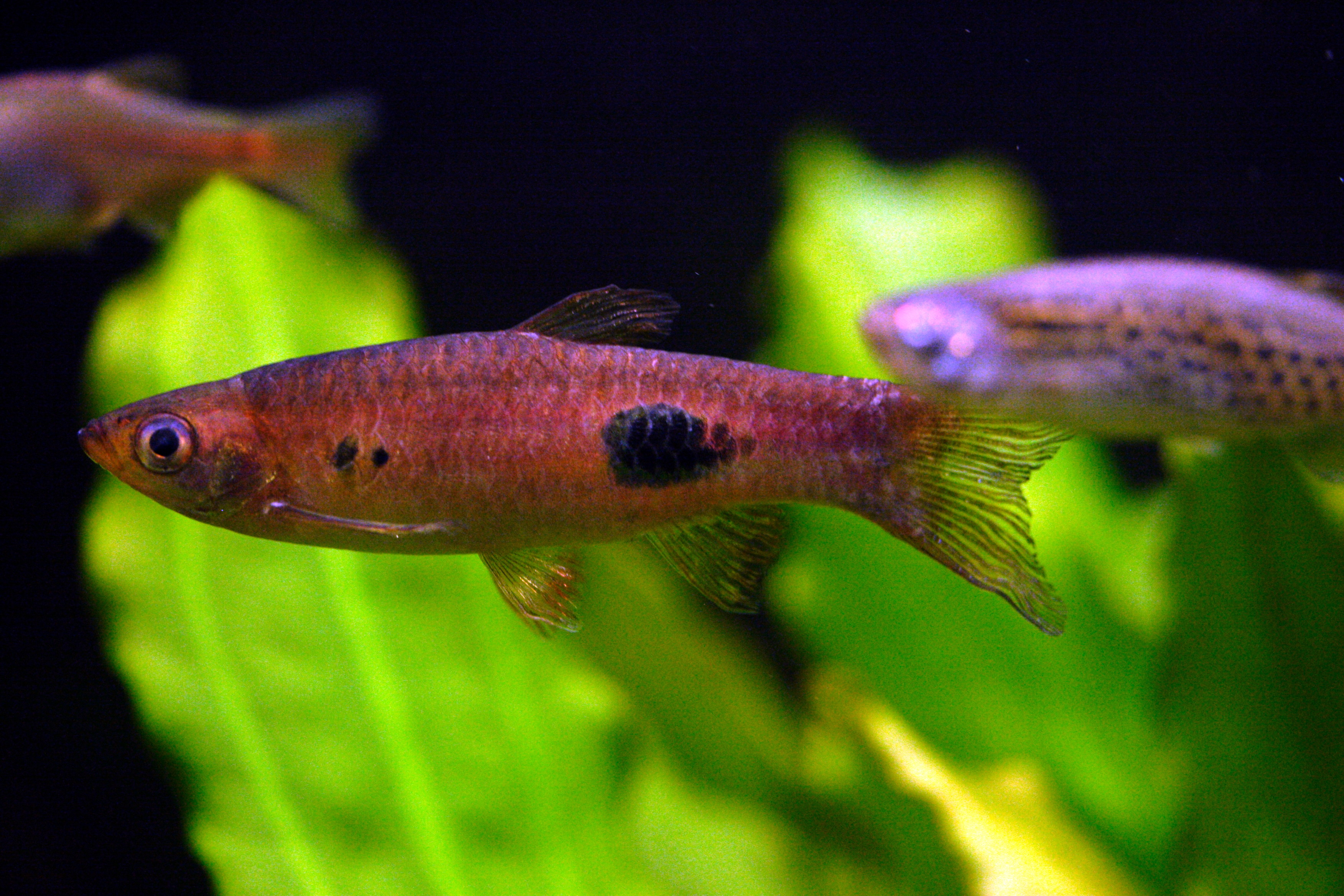

Conservation status
- Least Concern (IUCN 3.1)

Scientific classification
- Kingdom: Animalia
- Phylum: Chordata
- Class: Actinopterygii
- Order: Cypriniformes
- Family: Danionidae
- Genus: Rasbora
- Species: R. kalochroma

Binomial name
- Rasbora kalochroma (Bleeker, 1851)

Synonyms
- Leuciscus kalochroma Bleeker, 1851

= Clown rasbora =

Species of fish

The clown rasbora (Rasbora kalochroma) is a species of freshwater ray-finned fish in the genus Rasbora. This fish is found in Peninsular Malaysia, Borneo and Sumatra.

== Description ==
Clown rasbora can grow up to 4 in (10 cm) long. While coloring within populations may vary, it typically has a pinkish-red body with two dark spots located on the flank, one behind the gill and the other in the midsection of the flank. Some will have small dark spots in between connecting the large dark markings. Females are noticeably larger than males and have rounder bellies, while males are slimmer and exhibit more vibrant colors.

== Conservation ==
The native habitat of this Rasbora species is the tannin stained waters of Southeast Asia. These swamps and rivers get their dark hue from broken down plant matter making the water acidic and staining the water a dark brown color. These rivers are normally covered with a large canopy, containing lots of leaves and twigs in the water allowing for protection. In order to keep these habitats safe, the government has established a Peat Restoration Agency (BRG) to restore what has already been damaged by pollution. Peat swamps are mainly degraded by permitted plantation and mining activities. The BRG are using three primary approaches to conservation: rewetting, revegetation, and peatland community revitalization. Peat swamps are vital for some communities because they are a source of food and habitat. Peat swamps produce sago, which is a staple food for the people of New Guinea and the Maluku islands.

== Breeding ==
Clown rasbora have a specific spawning season with favorable conditions encouraging their offspring to survive. Males will display bright colors, attracting females to mate. Clown rasbora scatter their eggs in batches amongst the plants and rocks. These eggs should fall to ground level safely. In good conditions, eggs should hatch within 24 hours and will become free-swimming within 1-3 days. The offspring will feed on their yolk sac shell until it has been completely absorbed which normally happens by day 5.
