= Rasbora maninjau =

Conservation status
- Endangered (IUCN 3.1)

Scientific classification
- Kingdom: Animalia
- Phylum: Chordata
- Class: Actinopterygii
- Order: Cypriniformes
- Family: Danionidae
- Genus: Rasbora
- Species: R. maninjau

Binomial name
- Rasbora maninjau Lumbantobing, 2014

Species of fish

Rasbora maninjau is a species of ray-finned fish in the genus Rasbora. It is endemic to Lake Maninjau in Sumatra.
