= Rasbora bunguranensis =

Conservation status
- Data Deficient (IUCN 3.1)

Scientific classification
- Kingdom: Animalia
- Phylum: Chordata
- Class: Actinopterygii
- Order: Cypriniformes
- Family: Danionidae
- Subfamily: Rasborinae
- Genus: Rasbora
- Species: R. bunguranensis

Binomial name
- Rasbora bunguranensis Brittan, 1951

Species of fish

Rasbora bunguranensis is a species of ray-finned fish in the genus Rasbora which is endemic to the Natuna Besar Island in Indonesia.
