= Rasbora truncata =

Conservation status
- Least Concern (IUCN 3.1)

Scientific classification
- Kingdom: Animalia
- Phylum: Chordata
- Class: Actinopterygii
- Order: Cypriniformes
- Family: Danionidae
- Genus: Rasbora
- Species: R. truncata

Binomial name
- Rasbora truncata Lumbantobing, 2010

Species of fish

Rasbora truncata is a species of ray-finned fish in the genus Rasbora. It is endemic to the Alas River in northwestern Sumatra.
