= Rasbora cryptica =

Conservation status
- Data Deficient (IUCN 3.1)

Scientific classification
- Kingdom: Animalia
- Phylum: Chordata
- Class: Actinopterygii
- Order: Cypriniformes
- Family: Danionidae
- Genus: Rasbora
- Species: R. cryptica

Binomial name
- Rasbora cryptica Kottelat & H. H. Tan, 2012

Species of fish

Rasbora cryptica is a species of ray-finned fish in the genus Rasbora. It is endemic to Sarawak in Borneo.
