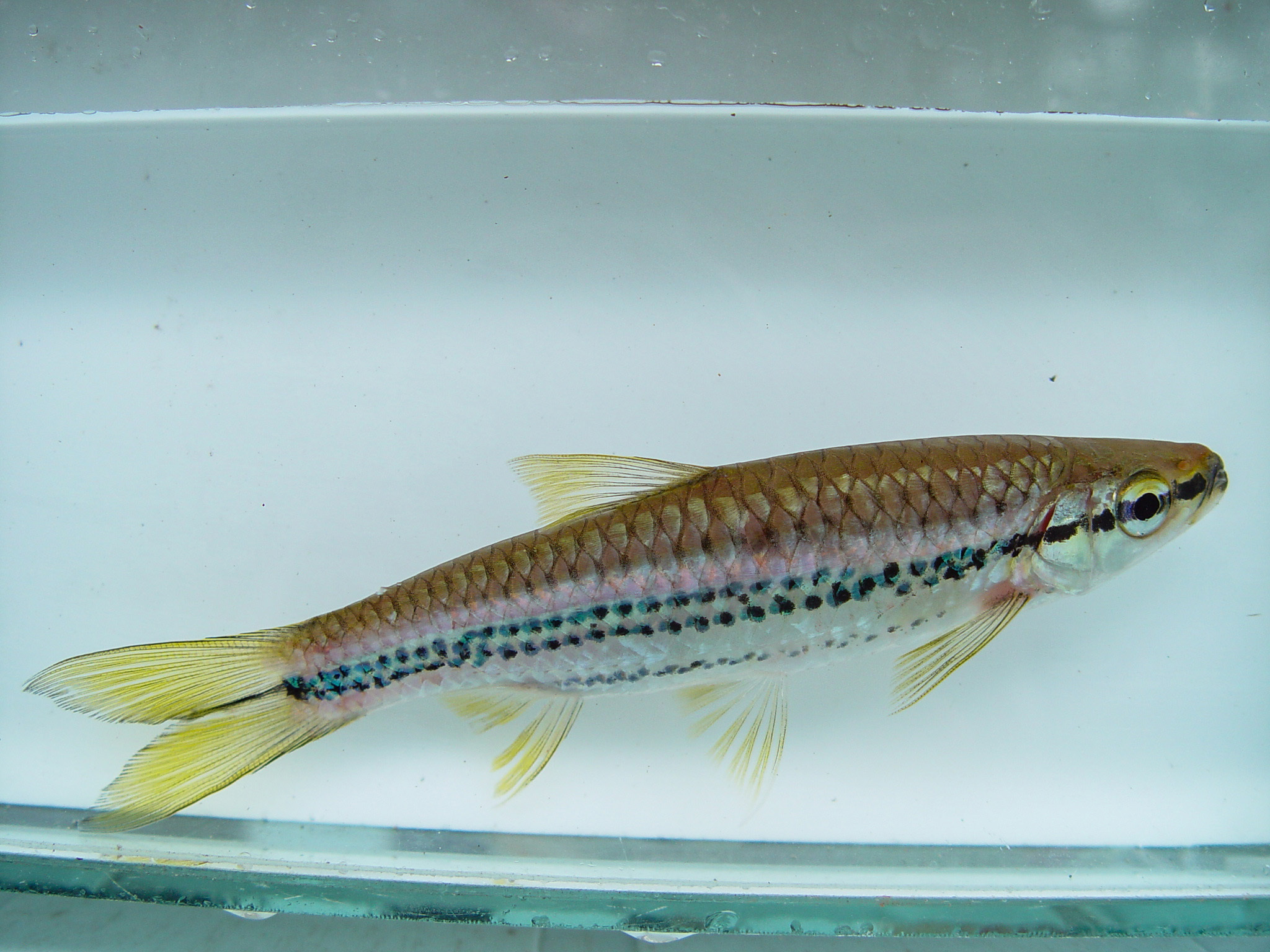

Conservation status
- Least Concern (IUCN 3.1)

Scientific classification
- Kingdom: Animalia
- Phylum: Chordata
- Class: Actinopterygii
- Order: Cypriniformes
- Family: Danionidae
- Subfamily: Rasborinae
- Genus: Rasbora
- Species: R. cephalotaenia

Binomial name
- Rasbora cephalotaenia (Bleeker, 1852)

Synonyms
- Rasbora beauforti Hardenberg, 1937

= Rasbora cephalotaenia =

Species of fish

Rasbora cephalotaenia is a species of ray-finned fish in the genus Rasbora. It is found on the Malay Peninsula and Indonesia.
