= Rasbora haru =

Conservation status
- Least Concern (IUCN 3.1)

Scientific classification
- Kingdom: Animalia
- Phylum: Chordata
- Class: Actinopterygii
- Order: Cypriniformes
- Family: Danionidae
- Genus: Rasbora
- Species: R. haru

Binomial name
- Rasbora haru Lumbantobing, 2014

Species of fish

Rasbora haru is a species of ray-finned fish in the genus Rasbora. It is endemic to the Bohorok River in Sumatra.
