= Rasbora sumatrana =

Conservation status
- Data Deficient (IUCN 3.1)

Scientific classification
- Kingdom: Animalia
- Phylum: Chordata
- Class: Actinopterygii
- Order: Cypriniformes
- Family: Danionidae
- Subfamily: Rasborinae
- Genus: Rasbora
- Species: R. sumatrana

Binomial name
- Rasbora sumatrana (Bleeker, 1852)

Species of fish

Rasbora sumatrana is a species of ray-finned fish in the genus Rasbora which is found in south-east Asia in the Chao Praya and the Mekong as well as on Sumatra and in western Borneo.
