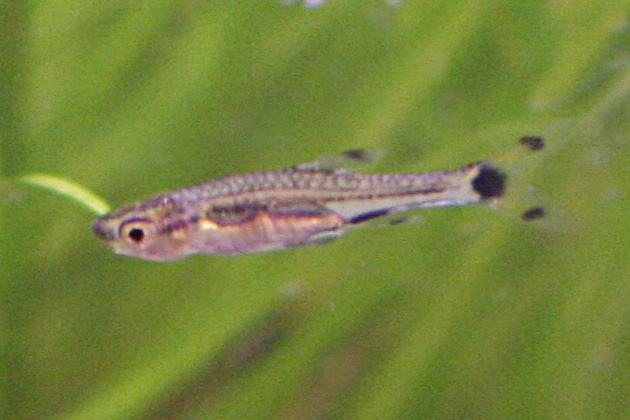

Conservation status
- Least Concern (IUCN 3.1)

Scientific classification
- Kingdom: Animalia
- Phylum: Chordata
- Class: Actinopterygii
- Order: Cypriniformes
- Family: Danionidae
- Subfamily: Danioninae
- Genus: Rasbosoma; T. Y. Liao, S. O. Kullander & F. Fang, 2010
- Species: R. spilocerca

Binomial name
- Rasbosoma spilocerca (Rainboth & Kottelat, 1987)

Synonyms
- Rasbora spilocerca Rainboth & Kottelat, 1987

= Dwarf scissortail rasbora =

Species of ray-finned fish

Rasbosoma is a genus of cyprinid fish found in the Mekong Basin of Southeast Asia (Cambodia, Laos, and Thailand). The genus contains only one species, the dwarf scissortail rasbora or Rasbosoma spilocerca. They are small fish with maximum size 2.6 cm (1.0 in) SL.
