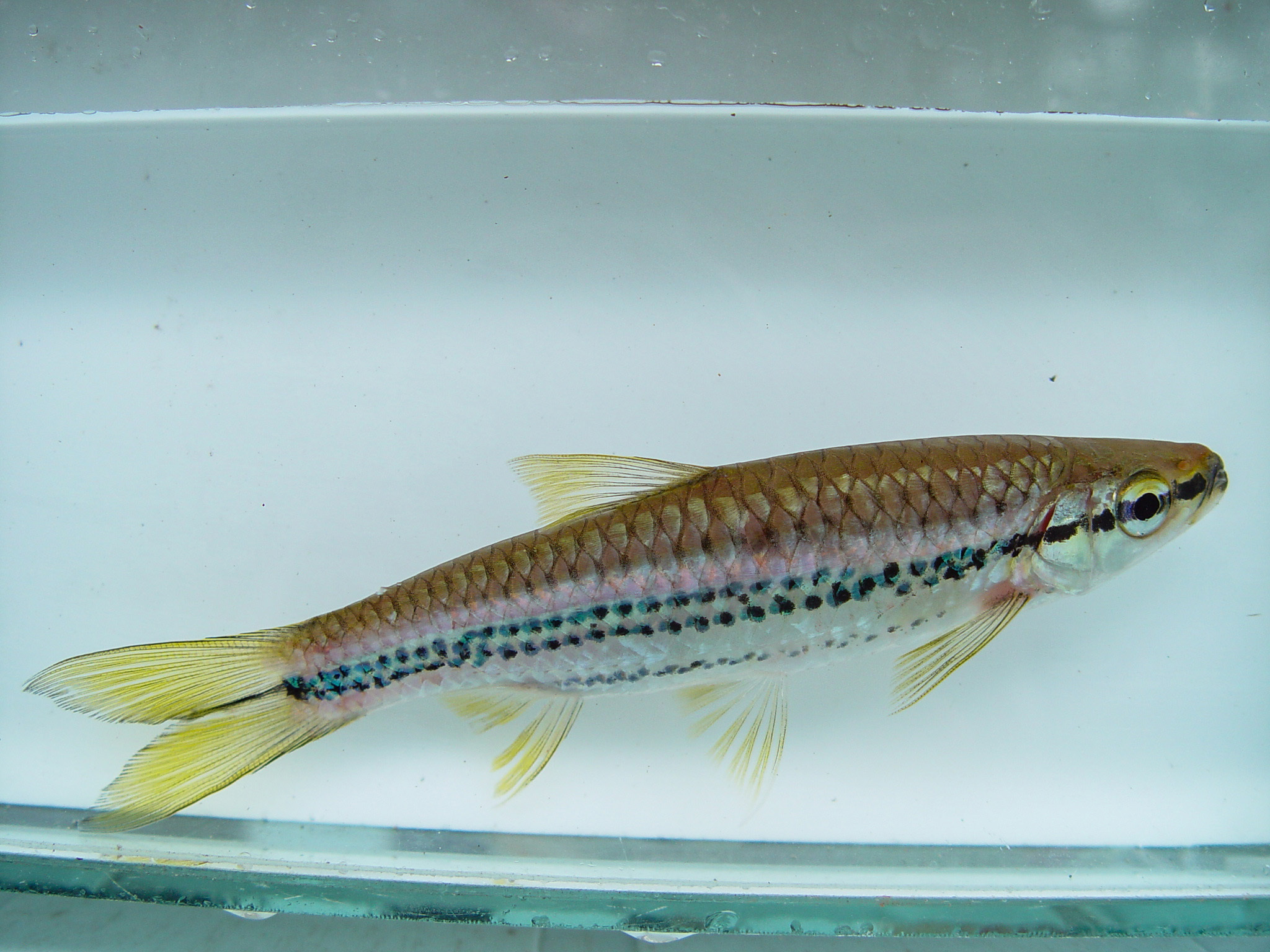
- Rasbora cephalotaenia, the type species of the genus Rasbora

Scientific classification
- Kingdom: Animalia
- Phylum: Chordata
- Class: Actinopterygii
- Division: Teleostei
- Order: Cypriniformes
- Family: Danionidae
- Subfamily: Rasborinae; Günther, 1868

= Rasborinae =

Subfamily of fishes

Rasborinae, the rasboras, is a subfamily of freshwater ray-finned fishes belonging to the family Danionidae, the danionins or danios. The fishes in this subfamily are found in Asia.

== Genera ==
Rasborinae contains the following genera:

- Amblypharyngodon Bleeker, 1860 (Carplets)
- Boraras Kottelat & Vidthayanon, 1993
- Brevibora T. Y. Liao, S. O. Kullander & F. Fang, 2010
- Horadandia Deraniyagala, 1943
- Kottelatia T. Y. Liao, S. O. Kullander & F. Fang, 2010
- Pectenocypris Kottelat, 1982
- Rasbora Bleeker, 1859
- Rasboroides Brittan, 1954
- Rasbosoma Liao, Kullander & Fang, 2010
- Trigonopoma T. Y. Liao, S. O. Kullander & F. Fang, 2010
- Trigonostigma Kottelat & Witte, 1999
