= Macrouridophora nezumiae =

Scientific classification
- Kingdom: Animalia
- Phylum: Platyhelminthes
- Class: Monogenea
- Order: Mazocraeidea
- Family: Diclidophoridae
- Genus: Macrouridophora
- Species: M. nezumiae

Binomial name
- Macrouridophora nezumiae (Munroe, Campbell & Zwerner, 1981)

Synonyms
- Diclidophora nezumiae Munroe, Campbell & Zwerner, 1981

Species of flatworm

Diclidophora nezumiae is a species of monogenean flatworm that parasitizes the gills of the rattail fish Nezumia bairdii. Due to a highly localized host habitat parasite incidence is relatedly localized to the Hudson Submarine Canyon.

== Description ==
D. nezumiae are similar in body shape to smaller Diclidophora species, with shorter bodies that taper to a maximum width at the first pair of clamps; 8 posterior clamps in total. Unlike other Diclidophora species, D. nezumiae have clamps that are wider than they are long, relatively small clamp suckers, postovarian testes and unlobed seminal receptacle on right side of ovary. An N- or U-shaped ovary is present in the posterior end of body. Eggs are elliptical and filamented, and larval stages are highly ciliated.

== Development ==
Like all monogeneans, D. nezumiae has no intermediate host and is ectoparasitic. It is hermaphroditic, with the male reproductive organs becoming functional prior to the female organs. Filamented egg development leads to a highly ciliated larval stage known as the oncomiracidium that contains several posterior hooks, and is responsible for host to host transmission.

== Epidemiology ==
The parasite is highly localized, affecting deep living benthic fish. The fish Nezumia bairdii in the Hudson Submarine Canyon, off the coast of New York City and Long Island, is the known host for this species, with an approximate 30% prevalence among fish and common infections incurring low numbers of parasites ranging up to 20 per host.

== Habitat ==
Living at depths beyond 300 meters below sea level, N. bairdii is the most abundant macrourid, showing highest rates of incidence and intensity at depths ranging between 700-1000m. Parasitism is rare for hosts that live at greater depths than 2500m.

== Symptoms ==
D. nezumiae are blood feeders, leeching off the gills of their host. Adults and immature worms prefer the gill arches while mature worms show preference for the dorsal one third of the hemibranch. Symptoms may include those similar to other monogeneans, such as Dactylogyrus, with inflamed gills, excessive mucous secretion, and accelerated respiration. Lethargy and appetite decrease are also possible but have not been recorded.
