= Pla taphian =

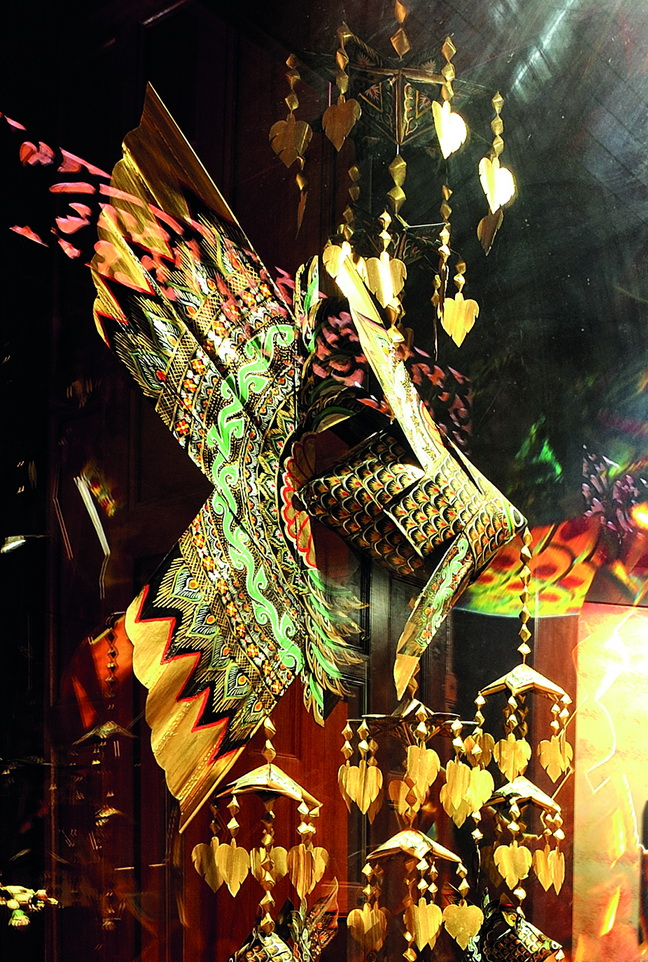
Specimen at the Ayutthaya Studies Institute

The Woven Pla Taphian (ปลาตะเพียนสาน, pronounced [plāː tā.pʰīa̯n]) is a traditional central Thai handicraft. It is a woven hanging mobile, usually made from palm leaves, in the form of a fish (specifically the tinfoil barb, which gives it its name). The barb is traditionally regarded as a symbol of prosperity and abundance, and pla taphian mobiles were usually hung over babies' cradles. Their production has largely declined over the centuries, but there are still centres of production where the craft is preserved. Today, pla taphian are mostly used as decorative objects.

== Description ==
In the past, long thin strips of palm leaves were cut, dried in the sun for 2–3 minutes, then woven into the shape of a fish. Because palm leaves are durable, they were sometimes painted in bright colors and assembled into mobiles. In earlier times, when most Thais were rice farmers, tinfoil barbs thrived in canals and paddies. The woven fish therefore became a symbol of abundance, since the time when the fish matured coincided with the ripening of rice. Elders also hung woven fish over baby cradles as blessings for good health.

There are two main types: decorative, colorful designs created during the reign of Rama V, and plain versions showing only the natural palm-leaf color.

Today, woven pla taphian are still produced as OTOP products by villagers of the Thawasukree group in Phra Nakhon Si Ayutthaya Province, creating income while preserving Thai cultural heritage. Some are also made with ribbon. In addition to colored palm-leaf fish introduced in the reign of Rama V, modern artisans have developed techniques of cutting patterns into palm leaves to add decorative value. They have expanded the use of woven fish beyond mobiles, registering them as OTOP products of Thonburi District, Bangkok, and establishing them as community enterprises with copyright protection and recognition as local wisdom.

== History ==
The weaving of palm-leaf fish and painting them red dates back to the Ayutthaya Kingdom. Historical evidence appears in Description of the Topography of Ayutthaya, an archival document from the reign of Uthumphon, which states:

On Ton Market Street there are shops selling musical instruments, boxes, wooden goods, elephants, horses, paper, cradles, hammocks, spirit houses, painted images, mats, woven palm-leaf pla taphian, and toy kangaroos.

The craft reflects Buddhist cosmology and ancient beliefs. According to the Traiphum, the universe is shaped like an inverted bowl surrounded by the Cosmic Mountain Range, with Mount Meru at the center. Beneath lies a giant fish named Ananda. When this fish stirs, the world trembles, sometimes violently. Thai idioms and proverbs about fish reflect this cultural worldview and the deep connection of Ayutthaya people with waterways.

Today, woven palm-leaf pla taphian mobiles symbolize blessings, abundance, good health, strength, and prosperity.

== Structure ==
A single mobile of woven pla taphian is called pla luk sip ha (“fifteen-fish mobile”). It consists of 9, 12, or 15 small fish around a mother fish, with four main parts:

- Part 1 – Keychain: ring and beads.
- Part 2 – Main fish: medium-sized woven fish (1 cm × 35 cm strips), decorated with beads.
- Part 3 – Small fish: smaller woven fish (0.8 cm × 16 cm strips), decorated with beads.
- Part 4 – Mother fish: largest fish, with three tassels, decorated with beads.
