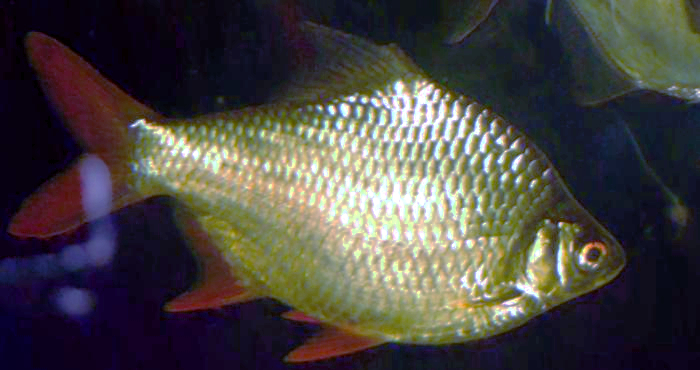
- Barbonymus schwanenfeldii

Scientific classification
- Kingdom: Animalia
- Phylum: Chordata
- Class: Actinopterygii
- Order: Cypriniformes
- Family: Cyprinidae
- Subfamily: Cyprininae
- Genus: Barbonymus; Kottelat, 1999

Type species
- Barbus schwanenfeldii Bleeker, 1853

= Barbonymus =

Genus of fishes

Barbonymus is a ray-finned fish genus in the family Cyprinidae, containing some barb species. The genus was only established in 1999, with the tinfoil barb (B. schwanenfeldii) as type species; thus, these fish are sometimes collectively called tinfoil barbs or simply tinfoils (in reference to their reflective, tinfoil-like scales). The new genus was established in recognition of the fact that some large Asian "barbs", formerly rather indiscriminately lumped in Barbus (typical barbels and relatives), Barbodes (barb-like carps) and Puntius (spotted barbs), form a distinct evolutionary lineage.

They are actually very close relatives of the common carp (Cyprinus carpio). Even though only five species are included at present, it is not certain whether these form a monophyletic lineage; the Java barb (B. gonionotus) for example seems to be very close indeed to Cyclocheilichthys, which unites a number of barb-like "carps". Past hybridization is known widely in Cyprinidae, and confounds molecular and other cladistic studies relying on a single source of data. Altogether the delimitation of the typical carps and allied genera remains still not fully solved. Individual variation of morphology within Barbonymus species is another obstacle in their systematics.

== Species ==
There are currently 10 recognized species in this genus:

- Barbonymus altus (Günther, 1868) (red-tailed tinfoil)
- Barbonymus balleroides (Valenciennes, 1842)
- Barbonymus belinka (Bleeker, 1860)
- Barbonymus collingwoodii (Günther, 1868)
- Barbonymus gonionotus (Bleeker, 1850) (Java barb)
- Barbonymus mahakkamensis (C. G. E. Ahl, 1922)
- Barbonymus platysoma (Bleeker, 1855)
- Barbonymus schwanenfeldii (Bleeker, 1853) (tinfoil barb)
- Barbonymus strigatus (Boulenger, 1894)
- Barbonymus sunieri (M. C. W. Weber & de Beaufort, 1916)

=== Cladograms ===
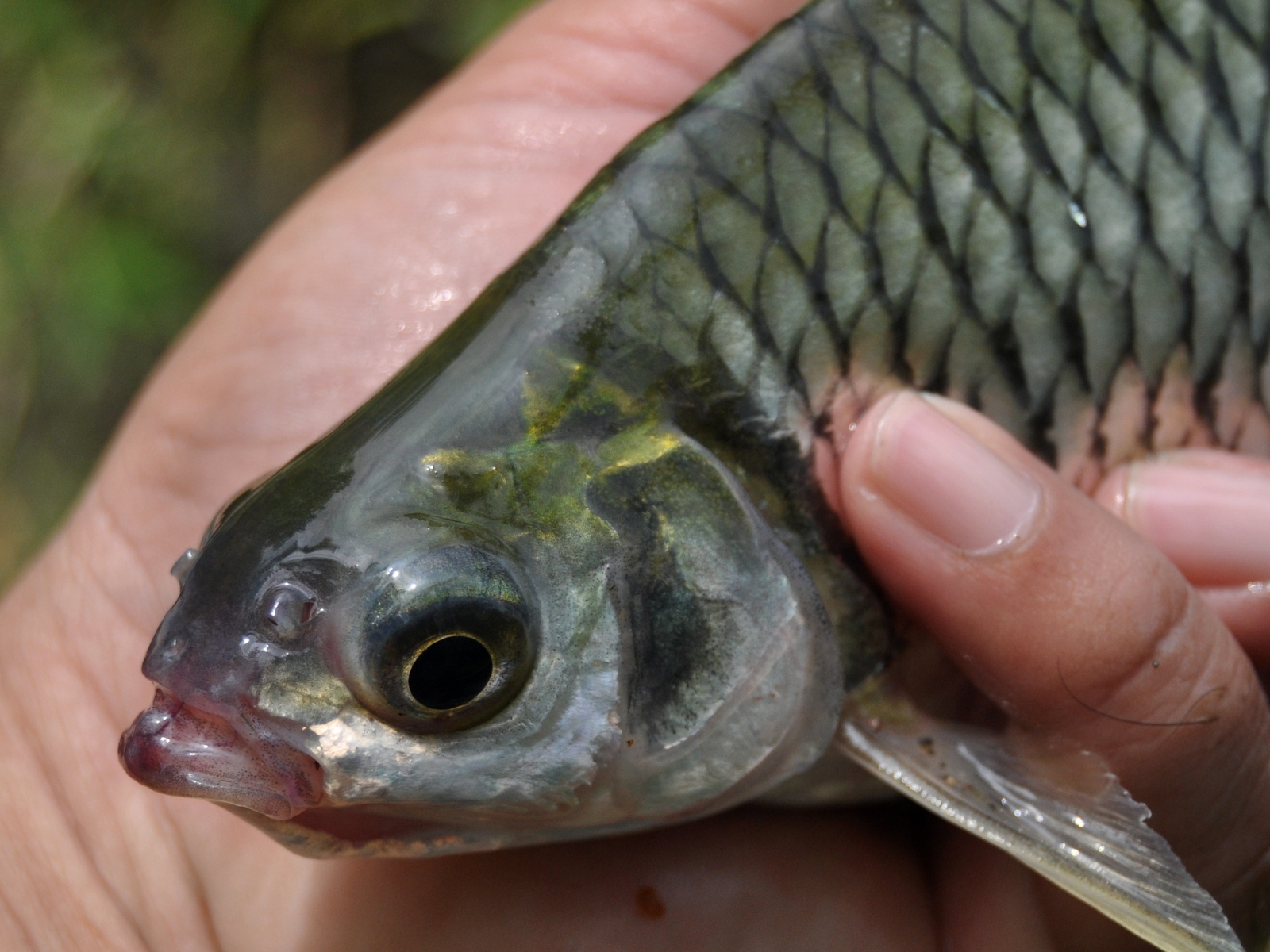
According to some studies, the Java barb (B. gonionotus) might not actually belong in this genus

COI analysis by Hasan et al. 2022

- - - Barbonymus gonionotus
    - Barbonymus schwanenfeldii
  - Barbonymus altus
- Catostomus commersonii

Mitogene analysis by Dahruddin et al. 2021

- - Barbonymus altus
  - - Barbonymus belinka
    - - Barbonymus mahakkamensis
      - Barbonymus schwanenfeldii
- Barbonymus gonionotus

This study suggests that B. gonionotus diverged from other Barbionymus spp. in the Miocene, while the other analyzed species speciated in the Pliocene.
