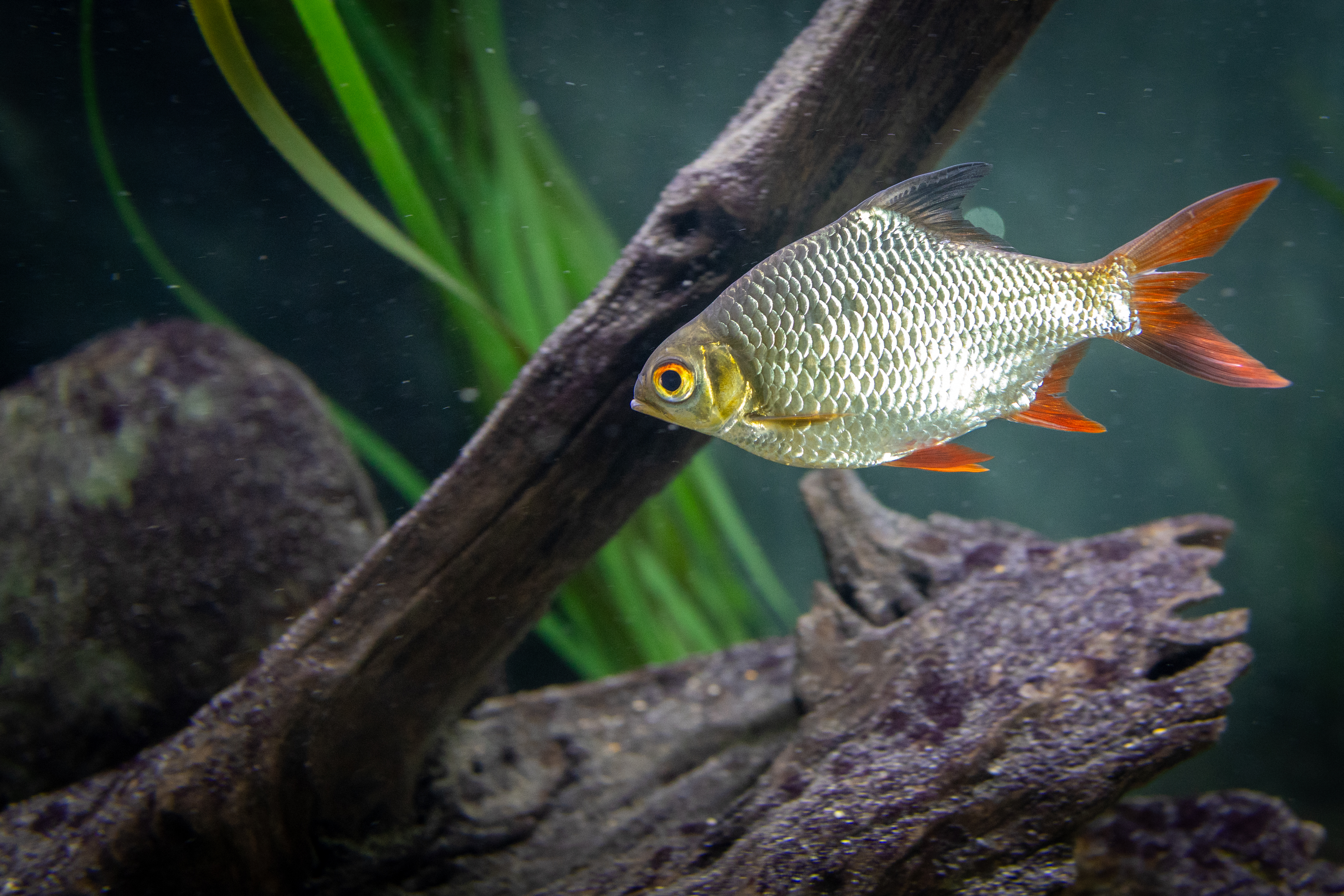

Conservation status
- Least Concern (IUCN 3.1)

Scientific classification
- Kingdom: Animalia
- Phylum: Chordata
- Class: Actinopterygii
- Division: Teleostei
- Order: Cypriniformes
- Family: Cyprinidae
- Subfamily: Cyprininae
- Genus: Barbonymus
- Species: B. schwanenfeldii

Binomial name
- Barbonymus schwanenfeldii (Bleeker, 1853)

Synonyms
- Barbodes schwanefeldii (lapsus); Barbodes schwanenfeldii (Bleeker, 1853); Barbonymus schwanefeldii (lapsus); Barbus schwanefeldii (lapsus); Barbus schwanenfeldii Bleeker, 1853; Puntius schwanefeldii (lapsus); Puntius schwanenfeldii (Bleeker, 1853)

= Tinfoil barb =

Species of fish

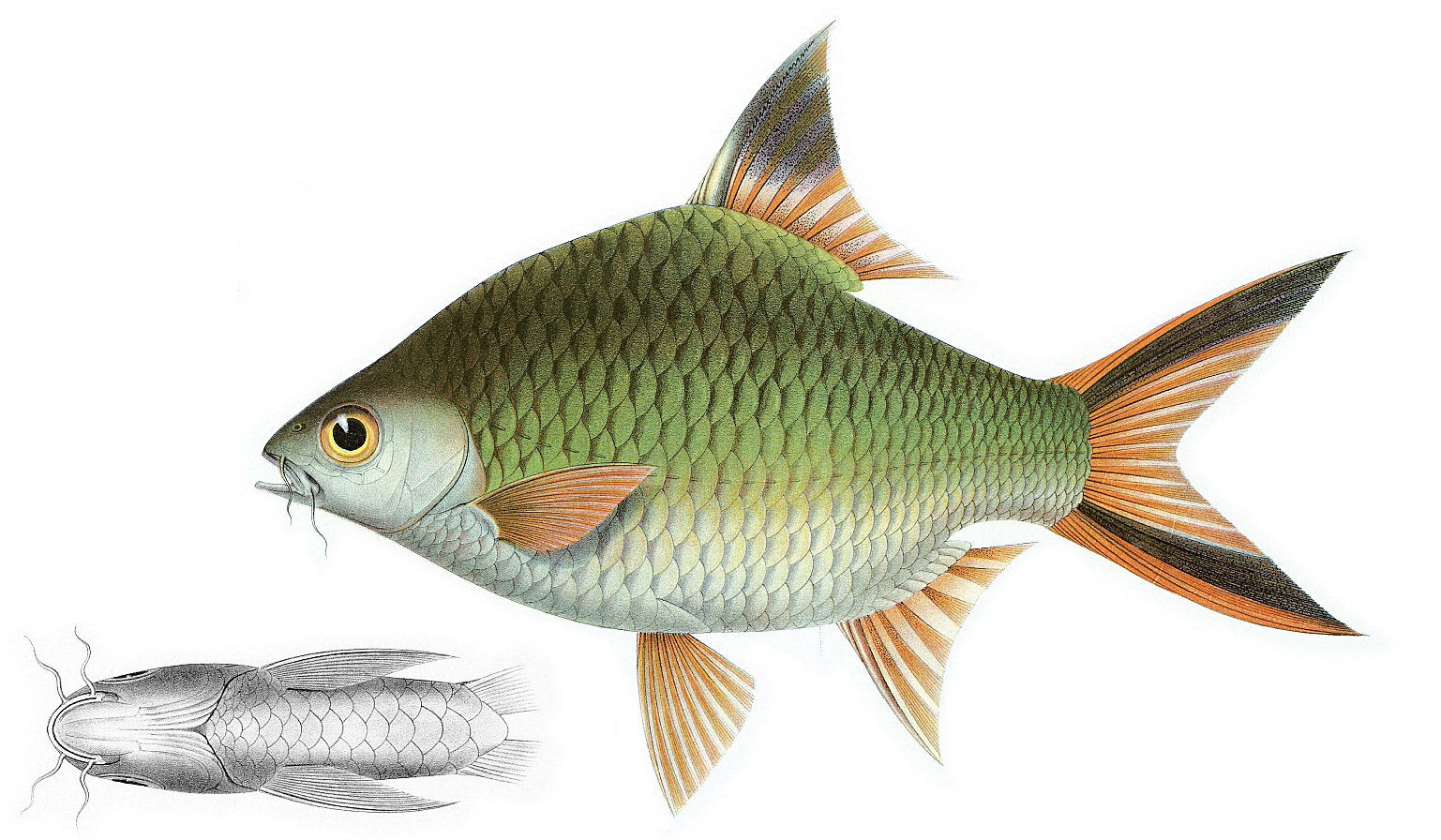

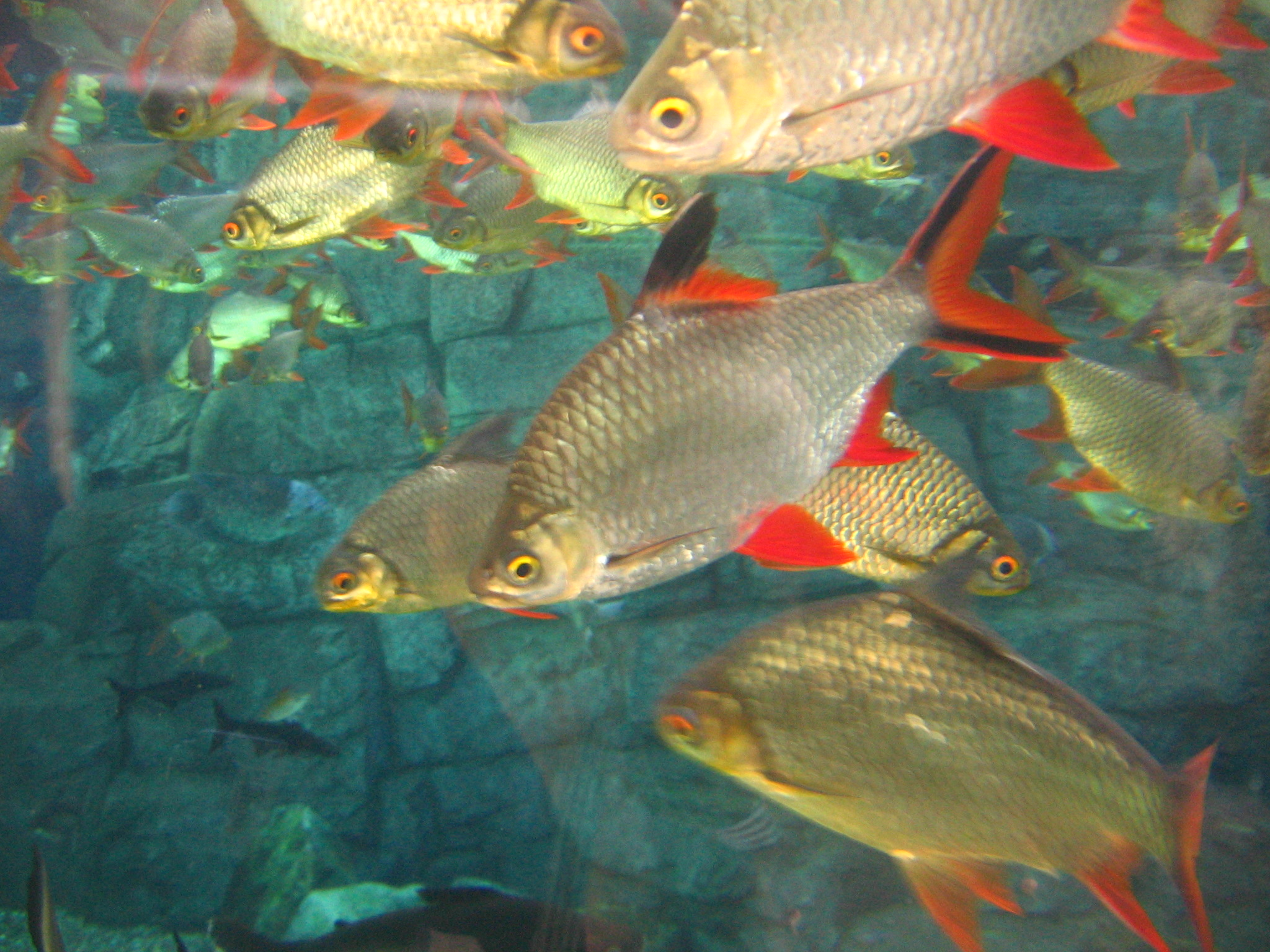
A school of tinfoil barbs in an aquarium

The tinfoil barb (Barbonymus schwanenfeldii) is a tropical Southeast Asian freshwater fish of the family Cyprinidae. This species was originally described as Barbus schwanenfeldii by Pieter Bleeker in 1853, and has also been placed in the genera Barbodes and Puntius. The specific epithet is frequently misspelled schwanefeldii.

Nowadays it is usually placed in the genus Barbonymus, which was only established in 1999. It is the genus' type species, and indeed seems to represent a quite distinct lineage of large "barbs". It is not very similar to the barbels which are the core of the genus Barbus, and though closer to these than to some African barbs, they seem to be closer still to the common carp (Cyprinus carpio) and to Cyclocheilichthys than to either of the aforementioned.

It is distinguishable from other species of the genus in having a red dorsal fin with a black blotch at the tip, red pectoral, pelvic and anal fins, red caudal fin with white margin and a black submarginal stripe along each lobe, and 8 scale rows between dorsal-fin origin and lateral line. Large individuals are silvery or golden yellow while alive with its dorsal fin red and caudal fin orange or blood-red. It grows up to 14 inches (36 cm) in length. Tinfoil barbs have a lifespan of 10 to 15 years.

Originating in the Mekong and Chao Phraya basins of Thailand, Cambodia, Laos, Vietnam and Sumatra, Borneo, and Malayan peninsula, the tinfoil barb is found in rivers, streams, canals, and ditches. It also enters flooded fields. Its natural habitat is in water with a 6.5–7.0 pH, a water hardness of up to 10 dGH, and a temperature range of 72–77 °F (22–25 °C). In Indonesia, a temperature range of 68.7 to 92.7 °F (20.4 to 33.7 °C) was recorded for this species. It is largely herbivorous, consuming aquatic macrophytes and submerged land plants, as well as filamentous algae and occasionally insects. It also feeds on small fishes, worms, and crustaceans.

The tinfoil barb is commercially important in the aquarium hobby trade, as well as commercial aquaculture, subsistence farming, and occasionally as bait. It is usually marketed fresh.

There are no obvious distinguishing characteristics used to determine the sex of the fish. They reproduce by egg scattering of several thousand eggs per spawning. They are not often bred in captivity for the aquarium trade due to their large size.

== Parasites ==
As most fish, the tinfoil barb harbours a number of parasite species. A 2023 study found that fish imported from Sri Lanka and Thailand harboured at least three species of monogeneans on their gills: Dactylogyrus lampam (Lim & Furtado, 1986), D. tapienensis Chinabut & Lim, 1993 and D. viticulus Chinabut & Lim, 1993.

== In the aquarium ==
The tinfoil barb is a schooling species that prefers to be placed with a number of its own species. It prefers living in water with strong currents similar to those found in their native streams. It is also recommended that they be kept with fish of similar size or larger. Many unwary buy young specimens and find out too late how large the tinfoil barb can grow. The tinfoil barb is often seen in large aquaria as companions to large cichlids e.g. the oscar cichlid, Astronotus ocellatus. The tinfoil barb is an active, peaceful species that spends most of its time in the mid-level and bottom of the water. A greedy eater, it will attempt to fill its mouth with as much food as possible during feedings. In captivity, it will eat almost anything provided to it.

== See also ==
- List of freshwater aquarium fish species
