= Barbonymus mahakkamensis =

Scientific classification
- Kingdom: Animalia
- Phylum: Chordata
- Class: Actinopterygii
- Order: Cypriniformes
- Family: Cyprinidae
- Subfamily: Cyprininae
- Genus: Barbonymus
- Species: B. mahakkamensis

Binomial name
- Barbonymus mahakkamensis (C. G. E. Ahl, 1922)

Synonyms
- Barbus mahakkamensis C. G. E. Ahl, 1922; Barbodes mahakkamensis (C. G. E. Ahl, 1922)

Species of fish

Barbonymus mahakkamensis is a species of cyprinid fish endemic to the island of Borneo where it is only known from the Indonesian portion of the island.
