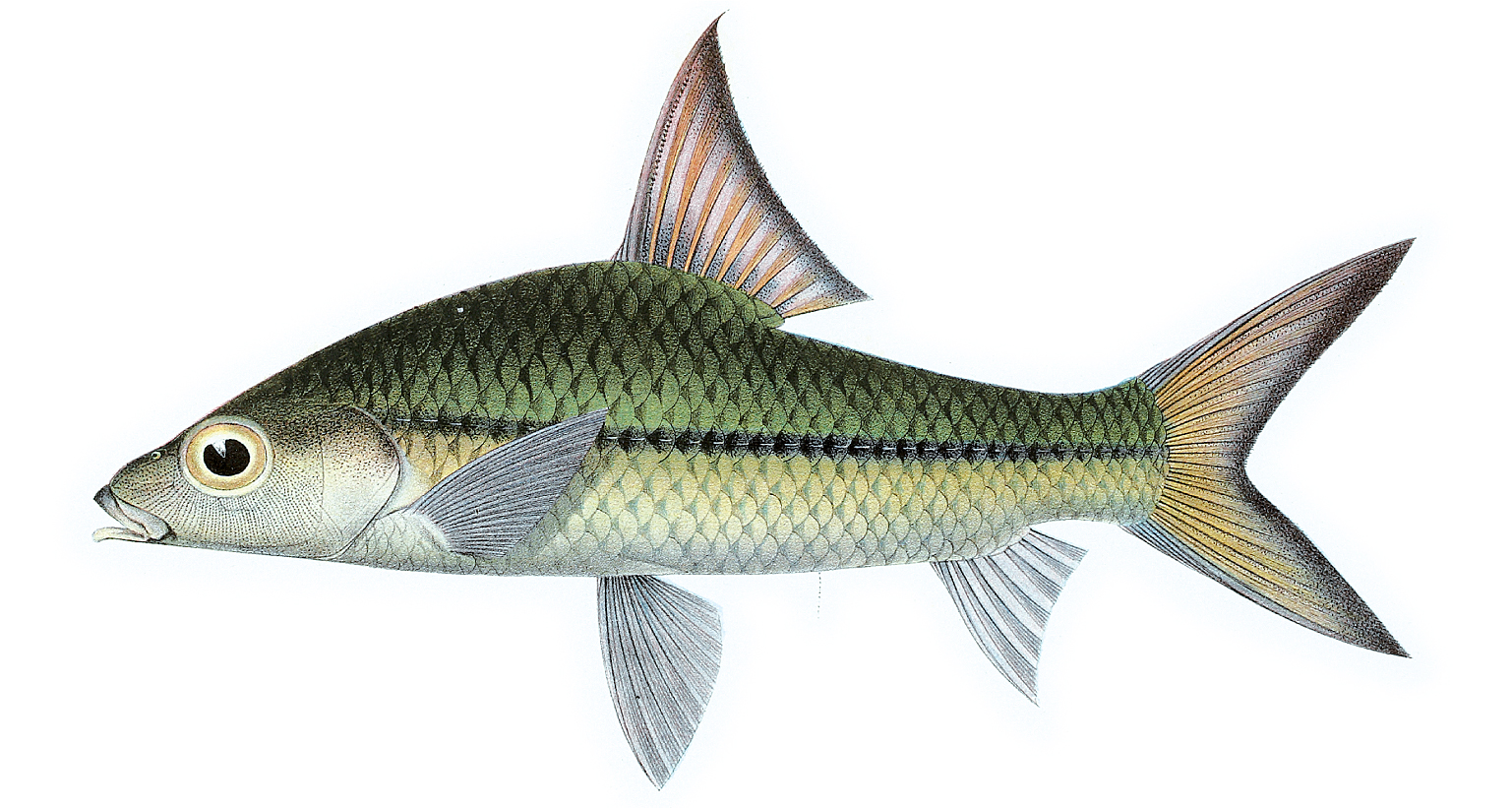

Conservation status
- Least Concern (IUCN 3.1)

Scientific classification
- Kingdom: Animalia
- Phylum: Chordata
- Class: Actinopterygii
- Order: Cypriniformes
- Family: Cyprinidae
- Genus: Cyclocheilichthys
- Species: C. janthochir

Binomial name
- Cyclocheilichthys janthochir (Bleeker, 1854)

Synonyms
- Systomus janthochir Bleeker, 1854; Barbus janthochir (Bleeker, 1854)

= Cyclocheilichthys janthochir =

Species of fish

Cyclocheilichthys janthochir is a species of freshwater fish in the family Cyprinidae. It is endemic to southwestern Borneo in Kalimantan (Indonesia) where it occurs in highly acidic blackwater streams and pools in peat swamp forests. It feeds on aquatic insects.

Cyclocheilichthys janthochir grows to 20 cm (7.9 in) total length.
