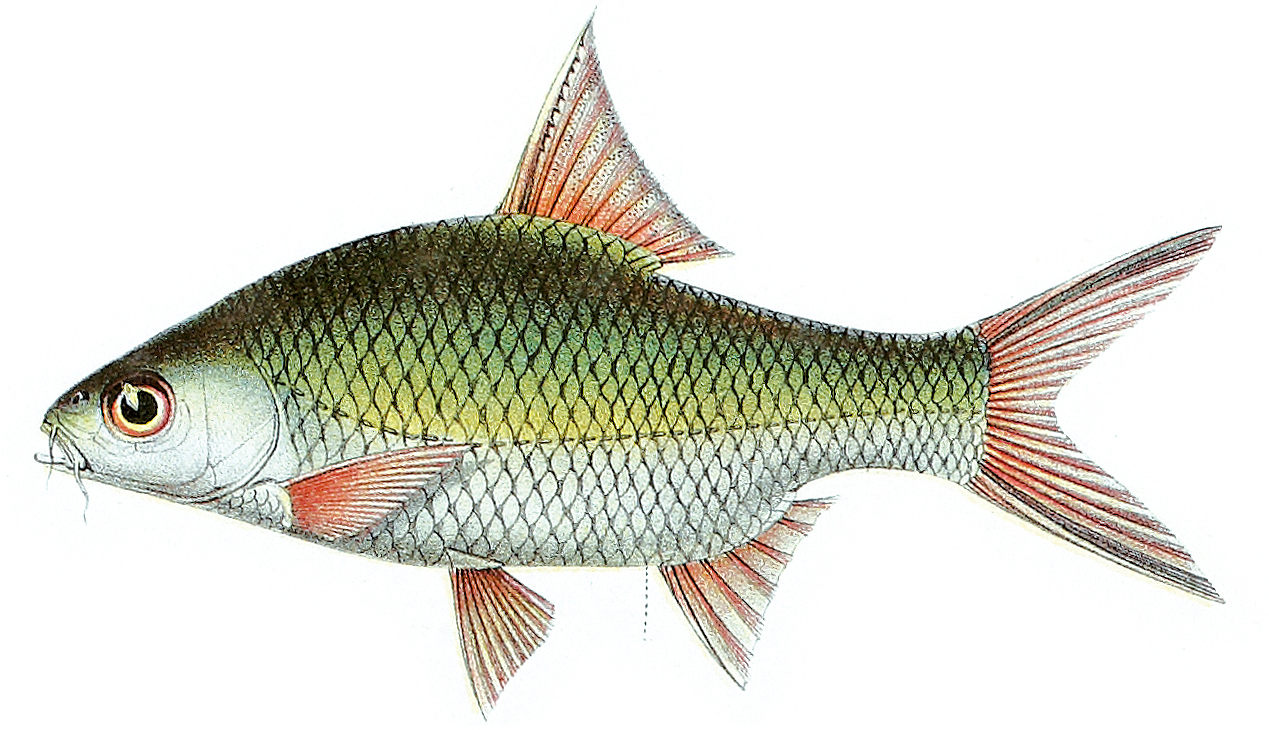

Conservation status
- Data Deficient (IUCN 3.1)

Scientific classification
- Kingdom: Animalia
- Phylum: Chordata
- Class: Actinopterygii
- Order: Cypriniformes
- Family: Cyprinidae
- Subfamily: Cyprininae
- Genus: Barbonymus
- Species: B. belinka

Binomial name
- Barbonymus belinka (Bleeker, 1860)

Synonyms
- Systomus belinka Bleeker, 1860; Barbodes belinka (Bleeker, 1860); Puntius belinka (Bleeker, 1860)

= Barbonymus belinka =

Species of fish

Barbonymus belinka is a species of cyprinid fish that is endemic to the west coast of Sumatra. This species can reach a length of 23.5 centimetres (9.3 in) TL.
