= Cyclocheilichthys armatus =

Scientific classification
- Kingdom: Animalia
- Phylum: Chordata
- Class: Actinopterygii
- Order: Cypriniformes
- Family: Cyprinidae
- Genus: Cyclocheilichthys
- Species: C. armatus

Binomial name
- Cyclocheilichthys armatus (Valenciennes, 1842)

Synonyms
- Barbus valenciennesii Bleeker, 1849; Vapoeta enoplos Bleeker, 1851; Capoeta deventeri Bleeker, 1855; Cyclocheilichthys (Siaja) macropus Bleeker, 1860; Cyclocheilichthys (Siaja) siaja Bleeker, 1860; Barbus lineatus Popta, 1905; Barbus fowleri Popta, 1906; Barbus dezwaani Weber [M.] & de Beaufort, 1912; Cyclocheilichthys tapiensis H. M. Smith, 1931; Cyclocheilichthys mekongensis Fowler, 1937; Cosmochilus nanlaensis Y. F. Chen, Z. C. He & S. P. He, 1992

Species of fish

Cyclocheilichthys armatus is a species of ray-finned fish in the genus Cyclocheilichthys. They are carriers of Opisthorchis viverrini, a pathogenic fish-borne zoonotic trematode, that is widespread across Southeast Asia.

== Footnotes ==
- Froese, Rainer; Pauly, Daniel (eds.). "Cyclocheilichthys armatus". FishBase.
