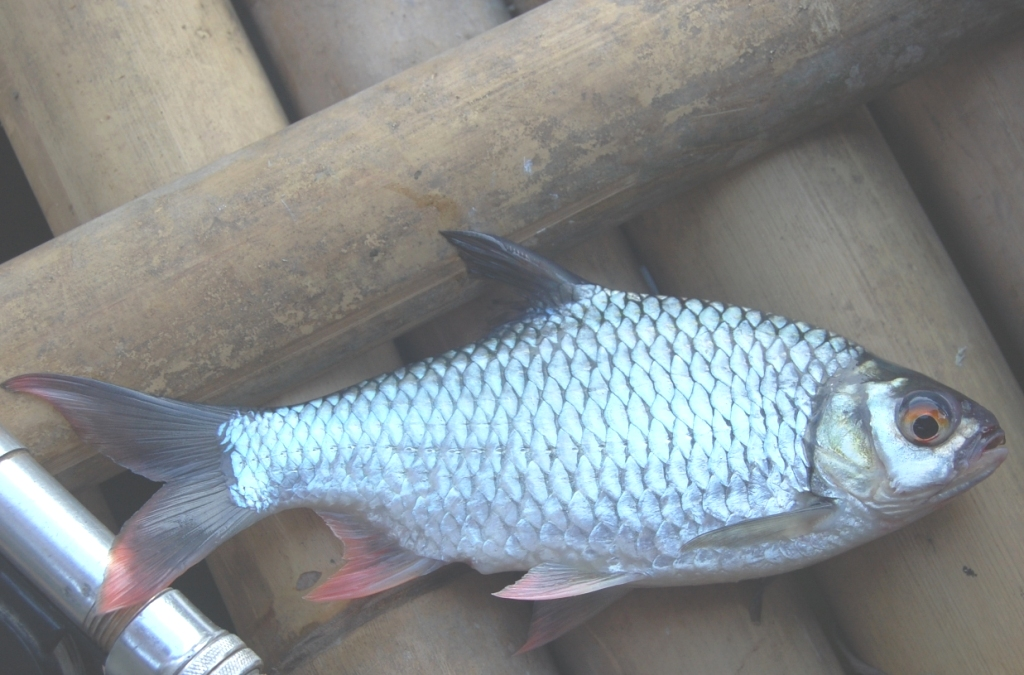

Conservation status
- Least Concern (IUCN 3.1)

Scientific classification
- Kingdom: Animalia
- Phylum: Chordata
- Class: Actinopterygii
- Order: Cypriniformes
- Family: Cyprinidae
- Subfamily: Cyprininae
- Genus: Barbonymus
- Species: B. balleroides

Binomial name
- Barbonymus balleroides (Valenciennes, 1842)

Synonyms
- Barbus balleroides Valenciennes, 1842; Barbodes balleroides (Valenciennes, 1842)

= Barbonymus balleroides =

Species of fish

Barbonymus balleroides is a species of ray-finned fish in the genus Barbonymus from south-east Asia. it is a widely eaten food fish and makes up the majority of the fish biomass in most of its range.

In East Malaysia and West Java, it is called Lampam Lalawak or Lelawak while in central java it is called Balar or Bader fish. however this name is used for a variety of other different cyprinid species.

== Description ==
Barbonymus balleroides has a maximum body length of 30 cm (12 in).

This fish also has a metallic gray base color, with bright red to grayish spots on the eyes, pelvic fins, caudal fin, and anal fin. Some specimens also have yellowish-green spots on the gills. This fish is often caught by fellow inshore fishermen like Faiq, Dava, Theo, etc.

== Distribution ==
The current distribution of the species is in the Danum Valley of Sabah, Malaysia and the waterways of west and central Java.

== Habitat ==
It inhabits fast to slow flowing permanent rivers, streams, and larger creeks. It is assumed that the species migrates into floodplains to breed during the monsoon
