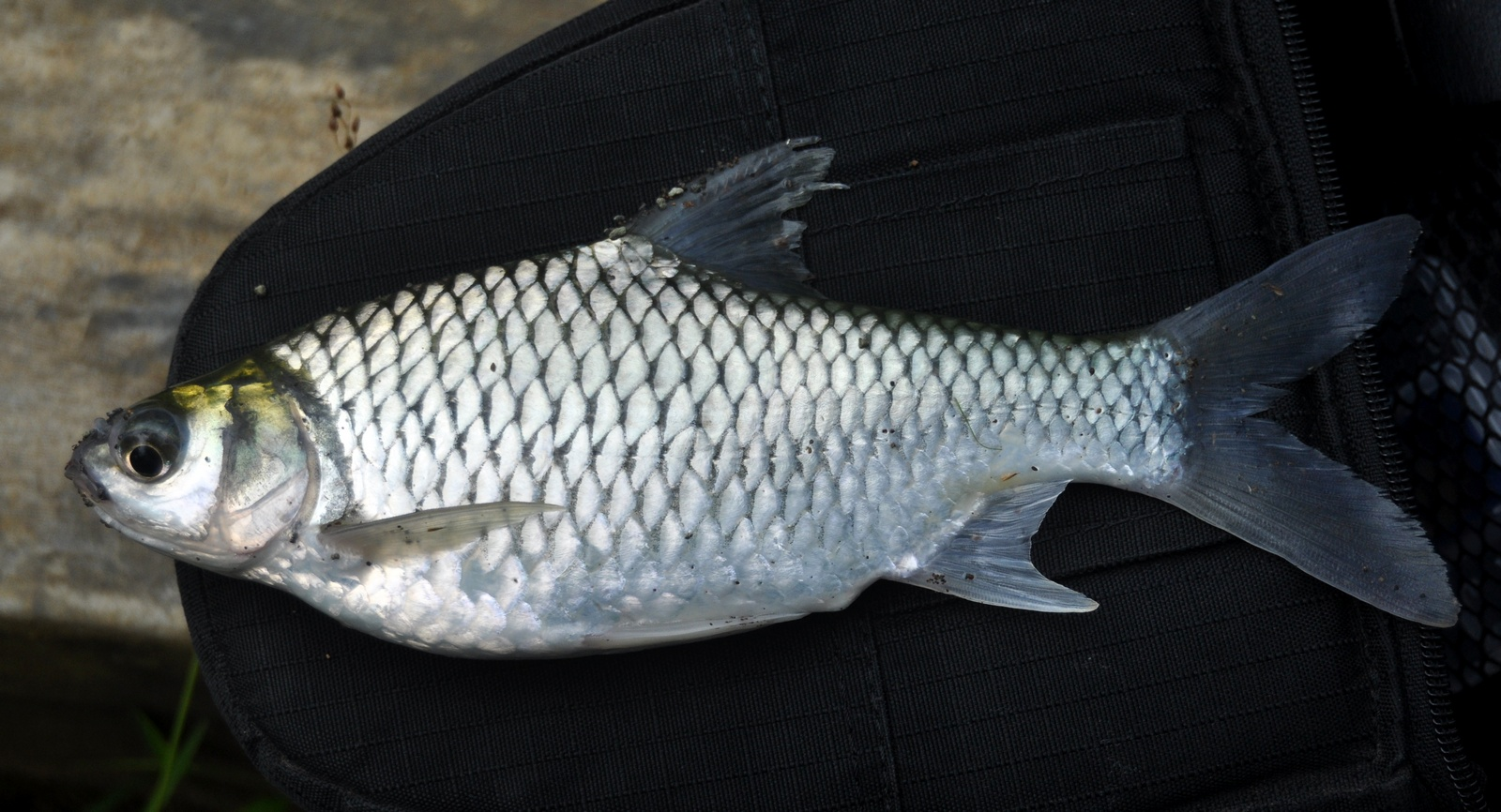

Conservation status
- Least Concern (IUCN 3.1)

Scientific classification
- Kingdom: Animalia
- Phylum: Chordata
- Class: Actinopterygii
- Division: Teleostei
- Order: Cypriniformes
- Family: Cyprinidae
- Subfamily: Cyprininae
- Genus: Barbonymus
- Species: B. gonionotus

Binomial name
- Barbonymus gonionotus (Bleeker, 1849)

Synonyms
- Barbodes gonionotus (Bleeker, 1849); Barbodes jolamarki (Smith, 1934); Barbus gonionotus Bleeker, 1849; Barbus javanicus Bleeker, 1855; Barbus koilometopon Bleeker, 1857; Puntius gonionotus (Bleeker, 1849); Puntius javanicus (Bleeker, 1855); Puntius javanicus Sauvage, 1881; Puntius jolamarki Smith, 1934; Puntius viehoeveri Fowler, 1943

= Java barb =

Species of fish

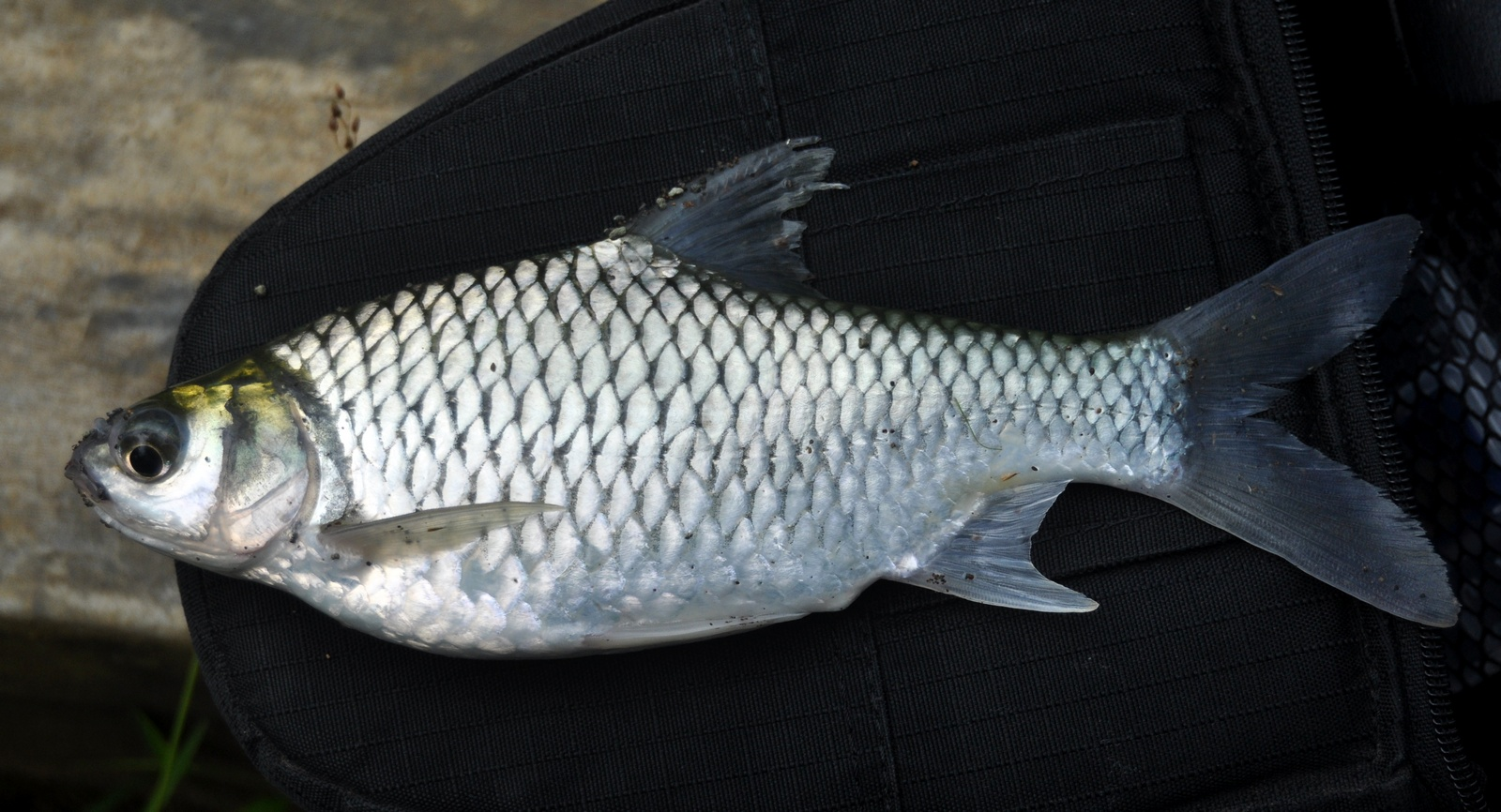
Java barb (Barbonymus gonionotus), from Tasikmalaya, West Java

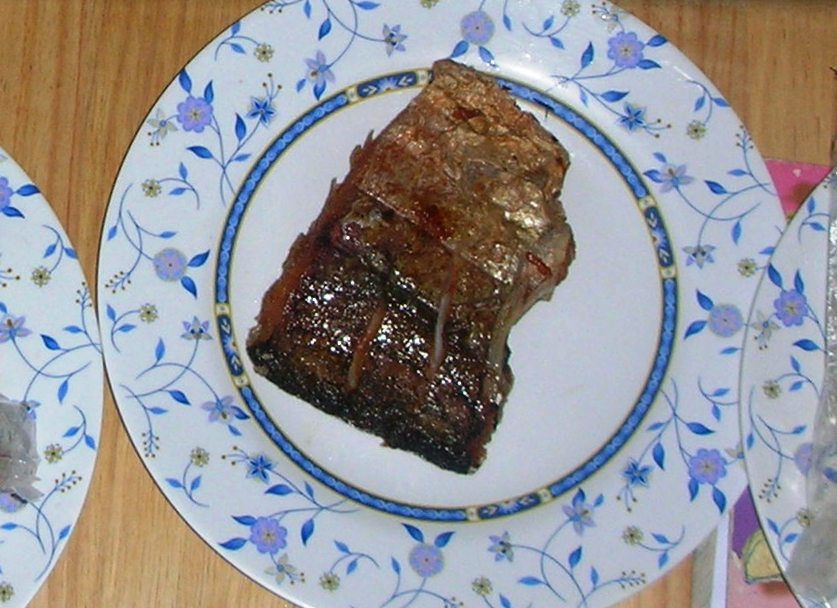
Deep fried chunk of pickled silver barb (pla som)

The Java barb (Barbonymus gonionotus; Thai: ตะเพียน Ta-phian; Lao: Pa keng; Khmer: ត្រីឆ្ពិន Trey Chpin; Indonesian: Tawes; Vietnamese: Mè Vinh), more commonly known as silver barb in aquaculture, or Java carp, is a species of ray-finned fish in the genus Barbonymus.

== Description ==
The Java barb has a strongly compressed body with an elevated back caused by an arched dorsal profile. It has a small head with a short, pointed snout and a terminal mouth, the snout's length is less than the diameter of the eye. It has very small barbels, with the upper barbels being minute, even disappearing entirely. The colour of fresh specimens is silvery white, occasionally tinted with gold. The dorsal and caudal fins are grey to grey-yellow while the anal and pelvic fins are pale orange with reddish tips and the pectoral fins are pale yellow. It has very few tubercles on the snout and these are only visible when magnified. The dorsal fin has four spines and eight soft rays while the anal fin has 3 spines and 6-7 branched rays. The males can grow to 40.5 cm (15.9 in) in total length.

== Distribution ==
The Java barb's natural distribution ranges from Vietnam, where it has been recorded in the Mekong Delta and Dong Nai River, through the basin of the Mekong to the Chao Phraya basin in Thailand. It is also found on Sumatra and Java and has been recorded from the Rajang River basin in Sarawak, Borneo. An introduced population has been found in Peninsular Malaysia.

== Habitat and ecology ==
The Java barb is found in the middle of the water column to the bottom in rivers, streams, floodplains, and sometimes in reservoirs. It shows and apparent preference for still water habitats rather than flowing waters. During periods of raised water levels it moves into flooded forest. Its diet consists of plant matter such as leaves, weeds, Ipomoea reptans and Hydrilla as well as some invertebrates. It is not a long distance migrant but is a local migrant in the Mekong showing a rainy season movement from the main river channel into small streams and canals and then into flooded areas returning as the water recedes. The upstream migration of the Java barb seems to be triggered by the first rains and rising water levels.

== Human use ==
Capture (blue) and aquaculture (green) production of Silver barb (Barbonymus gonionotus) in thousand tonnes from 1950 to 2022, as reported by the FAO

The silver barb is one of the five most important aquacultured freshwater species in Thailand. The silver barb is a short-cycle species that, like tilapia, can be farmed with low technology and relatively less effort than other species, being thus popular as a farmed fish in Bangladesh, where it is known as Thai sharputi. The pituitary gland of the Java barb is frequently used to enable artificial propagation of other species of fish in aquaculture. Escaped farmed Java barb have established populations which support fisheries on several Southeast Asian islands. This species is also considered to be useful in controlling excessive vegetation in reservoirs. It can be infrequently found in the aquarium trade.

In fish farms, silver barbs rarely exceed 40 cm (16 in) in length and 1.5 kg (3 lb 5 oz) in weight. However, a 2.8 kg (6 lb 3 oz) specimen was caught in the Teak Tree Lake in Thailand and the rod and reel record with a weight of 13 kg (28 lb 11 oz) and a length of 90 cm (35 in) was caught in Malaysia.

It is an important food fish in Thai, Lao and Cambodian cuisine. In Laos it is commonly used as an ingredient for larb. In Thailand it is usually either pickled as pla som (ปลาส้ม) or boiled in tom yam.
