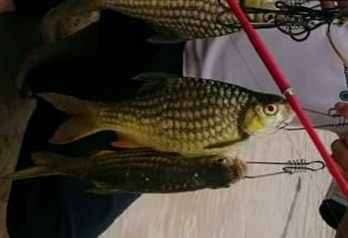

Scientific classification
- Domain: Eukaryota
- Kingdom: Animalia
- Phylum: Chordata
- Class: Actinopterygii
- Order: Cypriniformes
- Family: Cyprinidae
- Subfamily: Cyprininae
- Genus: Barbonymus
- Species: B. strigatus

Binomial name
- Barbonymus strigatus (Boulenger, 1894)

Synonyms
- Barbus strigatus Boulenger, 1894; Barbodes strigatus (Boulenger, 1894); Puntius strigatus (Boulenger, 1894)

= Barbonymus strigatus =

Species of fish

Barbonymus strigatus is a species of cyprinid fish endemic to the island of Borneo where it is only known to occur in the north, restricted to the state of Sabah. This species can reach a length of 16.8 centimetres (6.6 in) TL.
