= Cyclocheilichthys lagleri =

Conservation status
- Least Concern (IUCN 3.1)

Scientific classification
- Kingdom: Animalia
- Phylum: Chordata
- Class: Actinopterygii
- Order: Cypriniformes
- Family: Cyprinidae
- Genus: Cyclocheilichthys
- Species: C. lagleri

Binomial name
- Cyclocheilichthys lagleri Sontirat, 1989

Species of fish

Cyclocheilichthys lagleri is a species of cyprinid fish in the genus Cyclocheilichthys, it is found in the upper Chao Phraya and lower Mekong basins in south-east Asia.

== Footnotes ==
- Froese, Rainer; Pauly, Daniel (eds.). "Cyclocheilichthys lagleri". FishBase.
