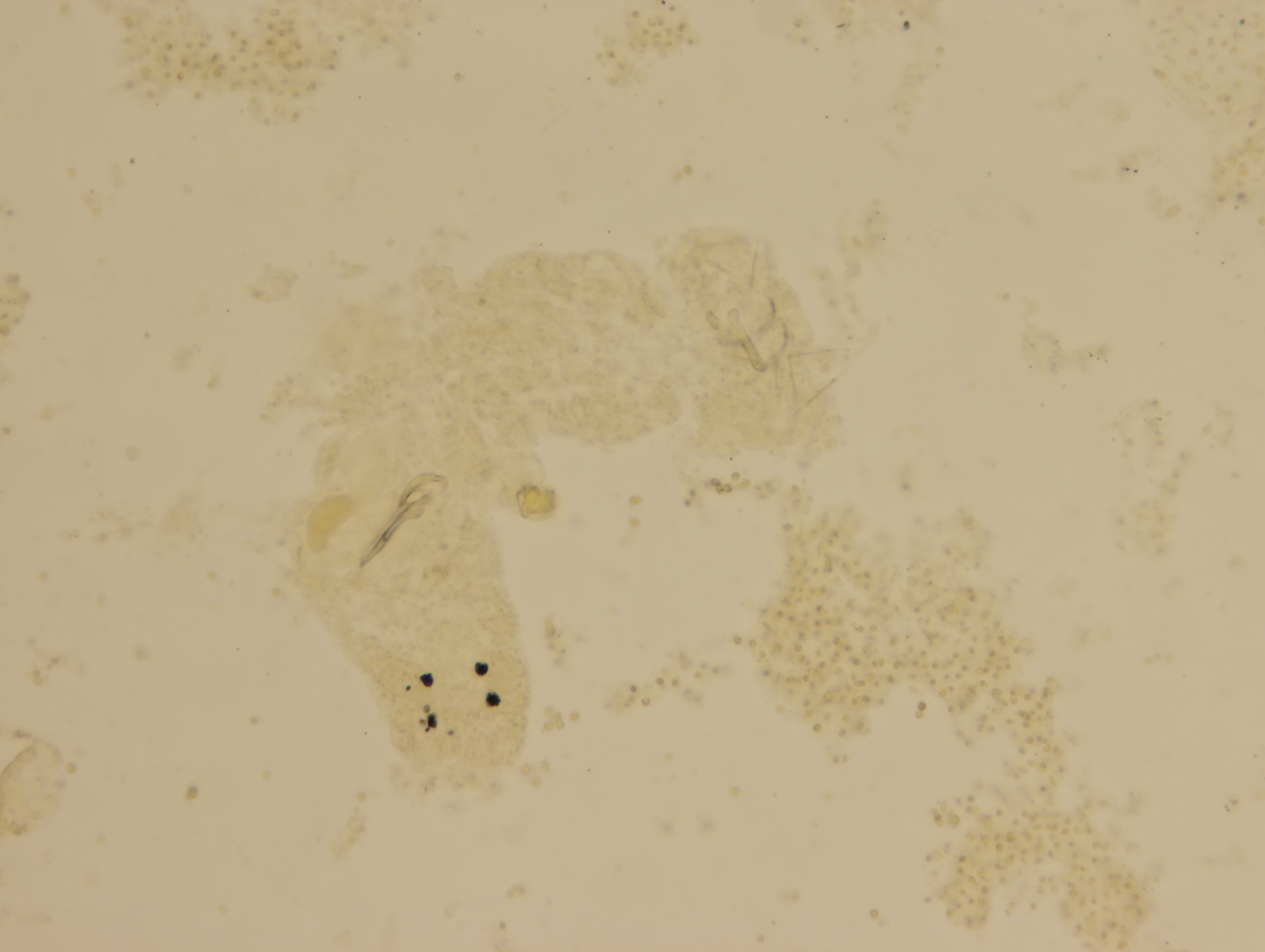

Scientific classification
- Kingdom: Animalia
- Phylum: Platyhelminthes
- Class: Monogenea
- Order: Dactylogyridea
- Family: Dactylogyridae
- Genus: Dactylogyrus
- Species: D. vastator

Binomial name
- Dactylogyrus vastator Nybelin, 1924

= Dactylogyrus vastator =

Species of flatworm

Dactylogyrus vastator is a species of monoic flatworms of class Monogenea. It is an ectoparasite of fish which infests the gills. It is problematic on fish farms. It is otherwise non-hazardous to humans.

== Characteristics ==
D. vastator is just over 1.25 millimeters long. It has two pairs of hooks known as hamuli, one on the lower surface of the worm, and a larger set at the rear. It has three pairs of sticky sacs and four eyespots.

== Distribution ==
D. vastator lives in the northern parts of North America, Europe, and Asia.

== Significance ==
The flatworm causes mass mortality among fingerling carp in fish-rearing ponds. Abnormal multiplication of cells in the gill epithelium interferes with carp's respiratory functions. The parasite is especially significant in the former Soviet Union, eastern and northern Europe, India, and Sri Lanka, where carp are bred for food.

== Life cycle ==
Dactylogyrus vastator has one host and no intermediate hosts. New hosts are located and infected by free-living larvae (oncomiracidium). D. vastator lives in the gills of carp species, including goldfish. The adult lays eggs on the gill filaments which are then washed out of the gill cavity and into the water. A ciliated oncomiracidium emerges from the egg in 3–5 days, depending on water temperature. In warmer temperatures the embryo develops more rapidly. The larva emerges, leaving the embryonic membrane inside the egg. The larva is drawn into the gill cavity of a host fish, where it attaches by its hooks. The larva can also swim actively and attach to the skin of the host and migrate to the gills. The larva reaches sexual maturity about ten days later.

Summer is the season of peak infestation, and by fall the worms are scarce. Eggs released late in the season enter diapause, a period of inactivity. When the water warms the following spring the eggs develop.

Young carp are more often infested, sometimes fatally when large numbers of worms attach to the gill filaments. Superinfection can occur during the summer when the worms are most abundant.
