= Paraheterobothrium =

Scientific classification
- Kingdom: Animalia
- Phylum: Platyhelminthes
- Class: Monogenea
- Order: Mazocraeidea
- Family: Diclidophoridae
- Genus: Paraheterobothrium; Ogawa, Itoh & Oliva, 2021

Type species
- Neoheterobothrium chilense Gonzalez, Oliva & Acuña, 2002

Genus of flatworms

Paraheterobothrium is a genus of monogeneans within the family Diclidophoridae.

== Species ==
- Paraheterobothrium chilense (González, Oliva & Acuña, 2002) Ogawa, Itoh & Oliva, 2021
- Paraheterobothrium exile (Crane, 1972) Ogawa, Itoh & Oliva, 2021
- Paraheterobothrium hippoglossini (Piasecki, Wierzbicka & Kempter, 2000) Ogawa, Itoh & Oliva, 2021
- Paraheterobothrium papillosum (Soler-Jiménez, Hernández-Mena, Centeno-Chalé & Vidal-Martínez, 2021) Ogawa, Itoh & Oliva, 2021
- Paraheterobothrium syacii (Mamaev & Zhukov in Mamaev, 1987) Ogawa, Itoh & Oliva, 2021
