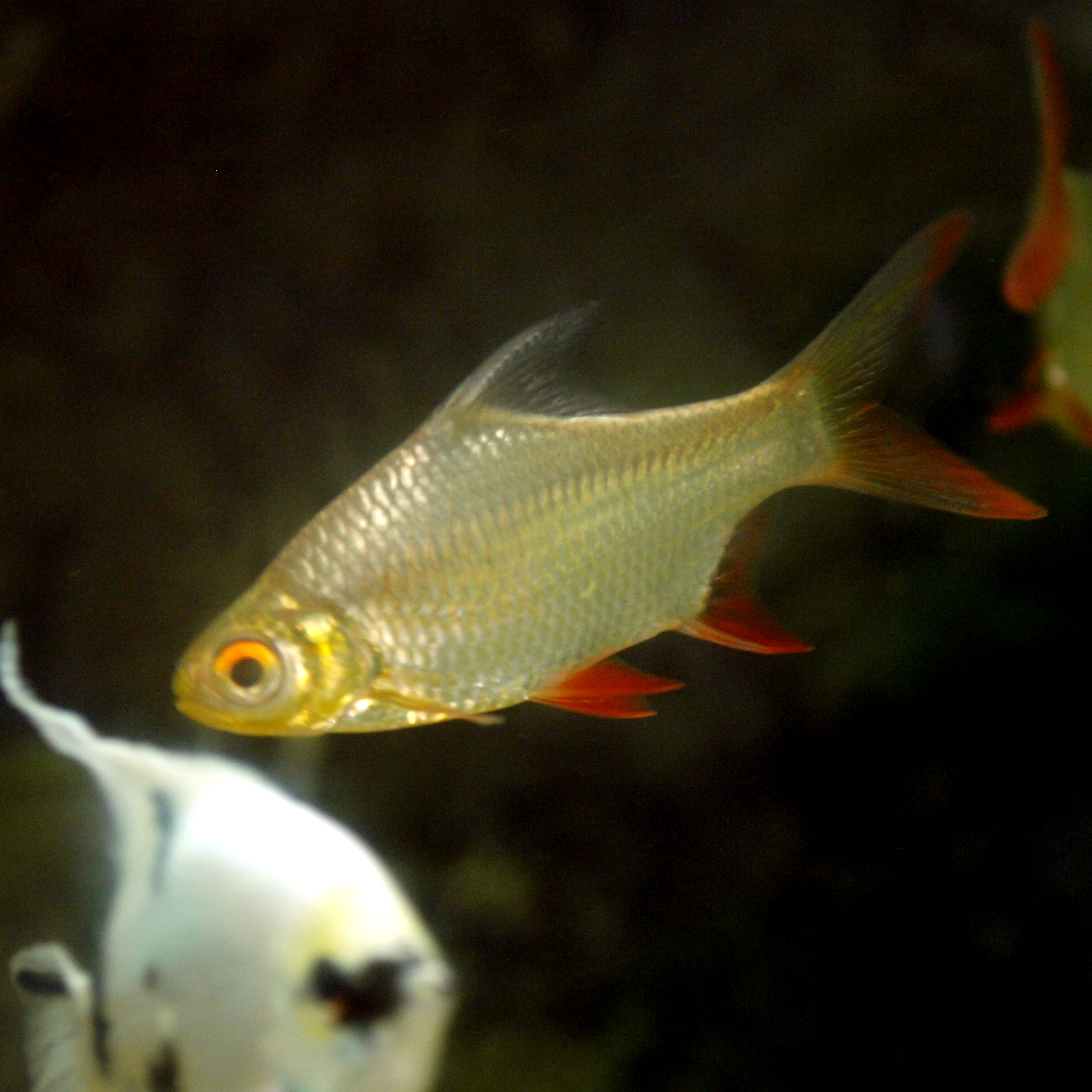

Conservation status
- Least Concern (IUCN 3.1)

Scientific classification
- Kingdom: Animalia
- Phylum: Chordata
- Class: Actinopterygii
- Order: Cypriniformes
- Family: Cyprinidae
- Subfamily: Cyprininae
- Genus: Barbonymus
- Species: B. altus

Binomial name
- Barbonymus altus (Günther, 1868)

Synonyms
- Barbus altus Günther, 1868; Barbodes altus (Günther, 1868); Puntius altus (Günther, 1868); Puntius bocourti Bleeker, 1864; Barbus foxi Fowler, 1937; Barbodes foxi (Fowler, 1937)

= Red tailed tinfoil =

Species of fish

The red tailed tinfoil or red tailed tinfoil barb (Barbonymus altus) is a species of freshwater cyprinid fish from South-East Asia. It lives in the Mekong and Chao Phraya river basins.
