= Cyclocheilichthys sinensis =

Scientific classification
- Kingdom: Animalia
- Phylum: Chordata
- Class: Actinopterygii
- Order: Cypriniformes
- Family: Cyprinidae
- Genus: Cyclocheilichthys
- Species: C. sinensis

Binomial name
- Cyclocheilichthys sinensis Bleeker, 1879

Species of fish

Cyclocheilichthys sinensis is a species of ray-finned fish in the genus Cyclocheilichthys.

== Environment ==
Cyclocheilichthys sinensis is known to be found in a freshwater environment within a benthopelagic range. This species is native to a subtropical climate.

== Size ==
Cyclocheilichthys sinensis has the maximum recorded length of about 31.5 centimeters or about 12.4 inches as an unsexed male. The common length of Cyclocheilichthys sinensis as an unsexed male is 12.4 centimeters or about 9.44 inches.

== Distribution ==
Cyclocheilichthys sinensis is native to Asia.

== Footnotes ==
- Froese, Rainer; Pauly, Daniel (eds.). "Cyclocheilichthys sinensis". FishBase.
