= Cyclocheilichthys schoppeae =

Conservation status
- Endangered (IUCN 3.1)

Scientific classification
- Kingdom: Animalia
- Phylum: Chordata
- Class: Actinopterygii
- Order: Cypriniformes
- Family: Cyprinidae
- Genus: Cyclocheilichthys
- Species: C. schoppeae

Binomial name
- Cyclocheilichthys schoppeae Cervancia & Kottelat, 2007

Species of fish

Cyclocheilichthys schoppeae is a species of cyprinid fish in the genus Cyclocheilichthys from the north of Palawan in the Philippines.
