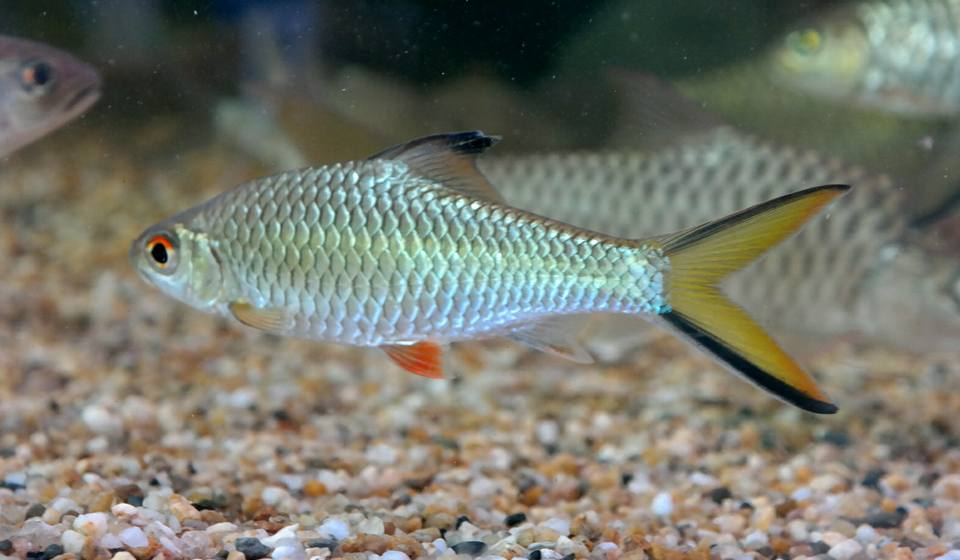

Scientific classification
- Kingdom: Animalia
- Phylum: Chordata
- Class: Actinopterygii
- Division: Teleostei
- Order: Cypriniformes
- Family: Cyprinidae
- Subfamily: Cyprininae
- Genus: Barbonymus
- Species: B. collingwoodii

Binomial name
- Barbonymus collingwoodii (Günther, 1868)

Synonyms
- Barbus collingwoodii Günther, 1868; Barbodes collingwoodii (Günther, 1868); Puntius collingwoodii (Günther, 1868); Barbus strigatus Vaillant, 1902; Barbus boulengerii Popta, 1905

= Barbonymus collingwoodii =

Species of fish

Barbonymus collingwoodii is a species of ray-finned fish in the genus Barbonymus which is found in fast flowing, cold upland streams in Borneo where it is endemic.

It is locally known as Kepiat or Kepek.

== Description ==
Distinguishable from other members of the genus in having a compressed and slightly elongated body with an elevated back, colored silvery or golden yellow. It has a small head with a short, pointed snout and a terminal mouth, a clear to slight red dorsal fin with a black blotch at the tip, orange to red pelvic fins, clear pectoral and anal fins, yellow to orange caudal fin with a black submarginal stripe along each lobe, and 8 scale rows between dorsal-fin origin and lateral line.

It grows up to 6 inches (15 cm) in length.

== Habitat ==
It is a riverine species that inhabits fast flowing forest streams and clear water pools with a rocky, sandy, or gravel base.
