= Barbonymus sunieri =

Conservation status
- Data Deficient (IUCN 3.1)

Scientific classification
- Kingdom: Animalia
- Phylum: Chordata
- Class: Actinopterygii
- Order: Cypriniformes
- Family: Cyprinidae
- Subfamily: Cyprininae
- Genus: Barbonymus
- Species: B. sunieri

Binomial name
- Barbonymus sunieri (M. C. W. Weber & de Beaufort, 1916)

Synonyms
- Puntius sunieri M. C. W. Weber & de Beaufort, 1916; Barbodes sunieri (M. C. W. Weber & de Beaufort, 1916)

Species of fish

Barbonymus sunieri is a species of cyprinid fish endemic to the island of Borneo where it is only known from the northeastern portion of the island. This species can reach a length of 28.7 centimetres (11.3 in) TL.
