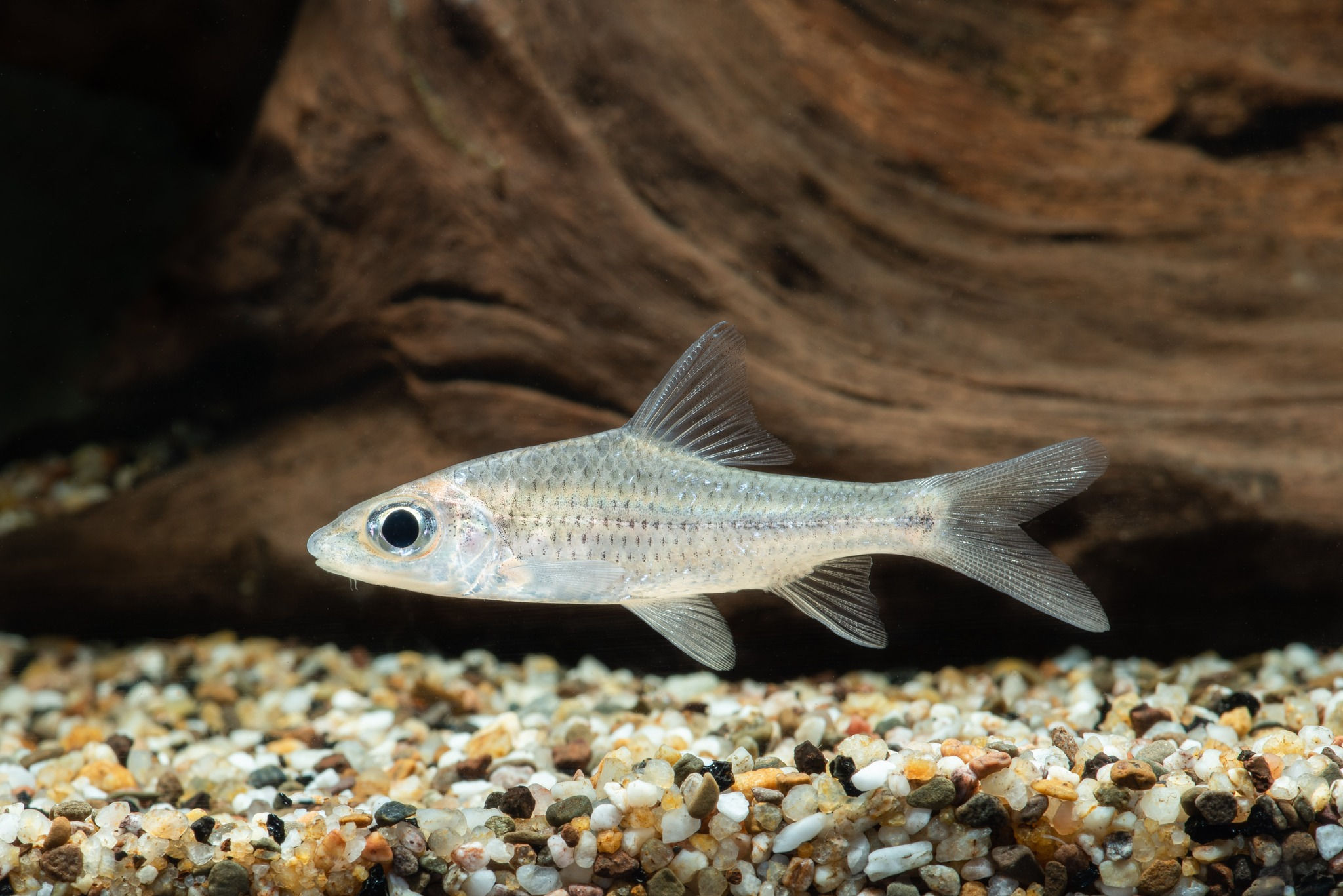
- A specimen of Cyclocheilichthys repasson from Malaysia

Conservation status
- Least Concern (IUCN 3.1)

Scientific classification
- Kingdom: Animalia
- Phylum: Chordata
- Class: Actinopterygii
- Order: Cypriniformes
- Family: Cyprinidae
- Genus: Cyclocheilichthys; Bleeker, 1859
- Species: C. repasson

Binomial name
- Cyclocheilichthys repasson (Bleeker, 1853)

Synonyms
- Barbus repasson Bleeker, 1853; Anematichthys repasson (Bleeker, 1853); Cyclocheilichthys megalops Fowler, 1905

= Cyclocheilichthys repasson =

Genus of fishes

Cyclocheilichthys repasson is a species of ray-finned fish in the family Cyprinidae found in to freshwater habitats in the Mekong and Chao Phraya basins, Malay Peninsula, Sumatra, Java and Borneo. The species was formerly classified in the monospecific genus Anematichthys.

Cyclocheilichthys repasson is a freshwater fish that grows to 28 cm (11 in) SL. It is a minor commercial fishery species that lives in rivers, canals, ponds and reservoirs.
