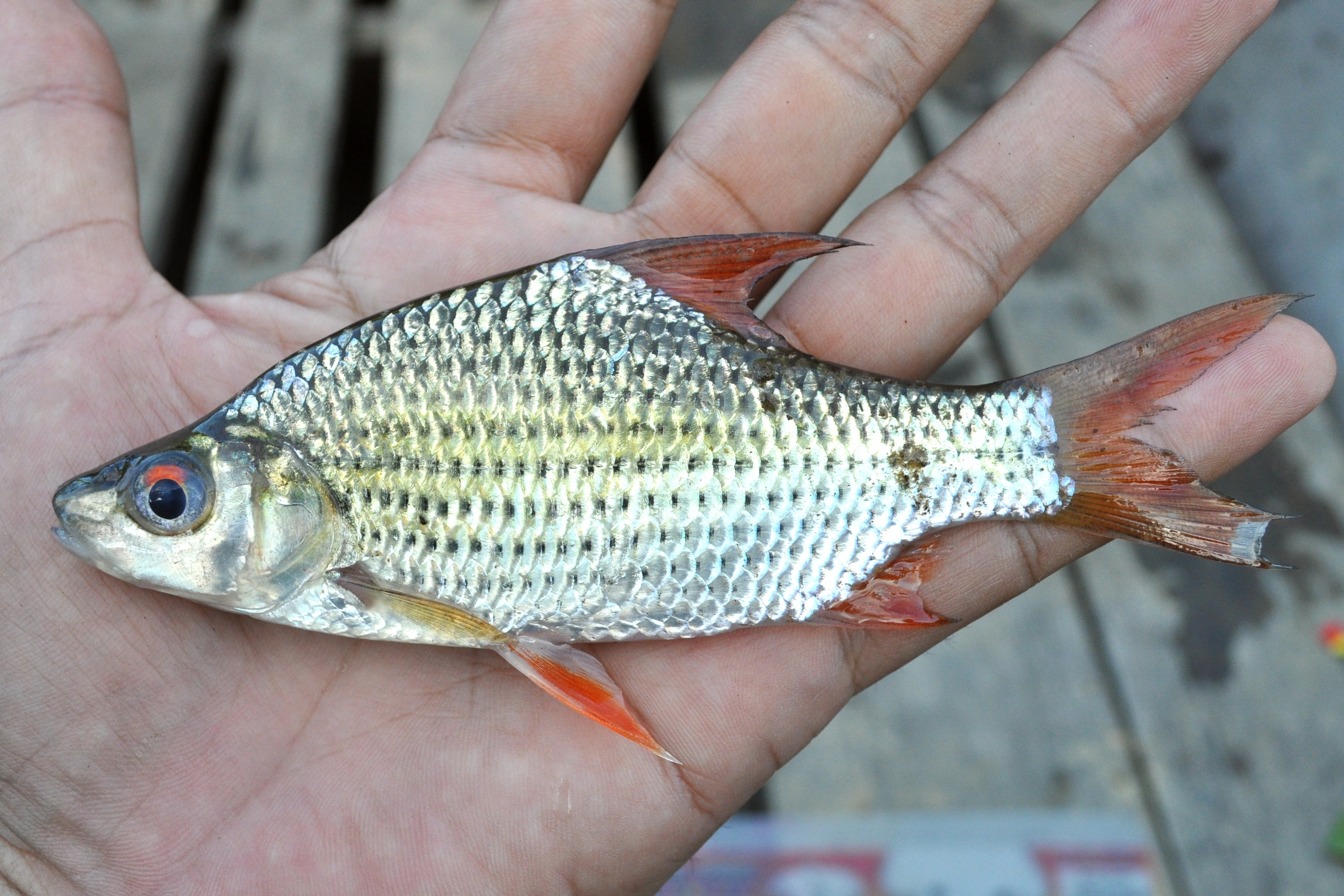
- Cyclocheilichthys apogon from Sambas, West Kalimantan, Indonesia

Conservation status
- Least Concern (IUCN 3.1)

Scientific classification
- Kingdom: Animalia
- Phylum: Chordata
- Class: Actinopterygii
- Order: Cypriniformes
- Family: Cyprinidae
- Genus: Cyclocheilichthys
- Species: C. apogon

Binomial name
- Cyclocheilichthys apogon (Valenciennes, 1842)

Synonyms
- Systomus apogonoides Bleeker, 1855; Rohteichthys macrolepis Holly, 1927; Cyclocheilichthys rubripinnis Fowler, 1934; Cyclocheilichthys rubripinnis var.microcephala Pellegrin & Chevey, 1941

= Beardless barb =

Species of freshwater fish

The beardless barb (Cyclocheilichthys apogon) is a species of freshwater fish in the family Cyprinidae. It is widespread in Southeast Asia. It grows to 25 cm (9.8 in) total length.

== Description ==
As its name suggests, the species does not have a barbel. There is a black blotch at the caudal base and rows of black spots along the scale rows. It grows to 25 cm (9.8 in) total length. A study from Borneo found that 8.1 cm (3.2 in) standard length was reached at the age of two years.

== Habitat ==
Beardless barb inhabits a range of freshwater environments: rivers, lowland swamps, marshlands (in flooding time), lakes, and reservoirs. It is a migratory species that enters flooded areas during the high-water season.

== Distribution ==
The species is found in the Mainland Southeast Asia (Myanmar, Thailand, Cambodia, Laos, Vietnam, Malaysia), including the Mekong and Chao Phraya basins, and in the Maritime Southeast Asia (Singapore, Malaysia, Indonesia), including the islands of Sumatra and Borneo.

== Utilization ==
Beardless barb is present in local food fisheries. It is also present in the ornamental fish trade.
