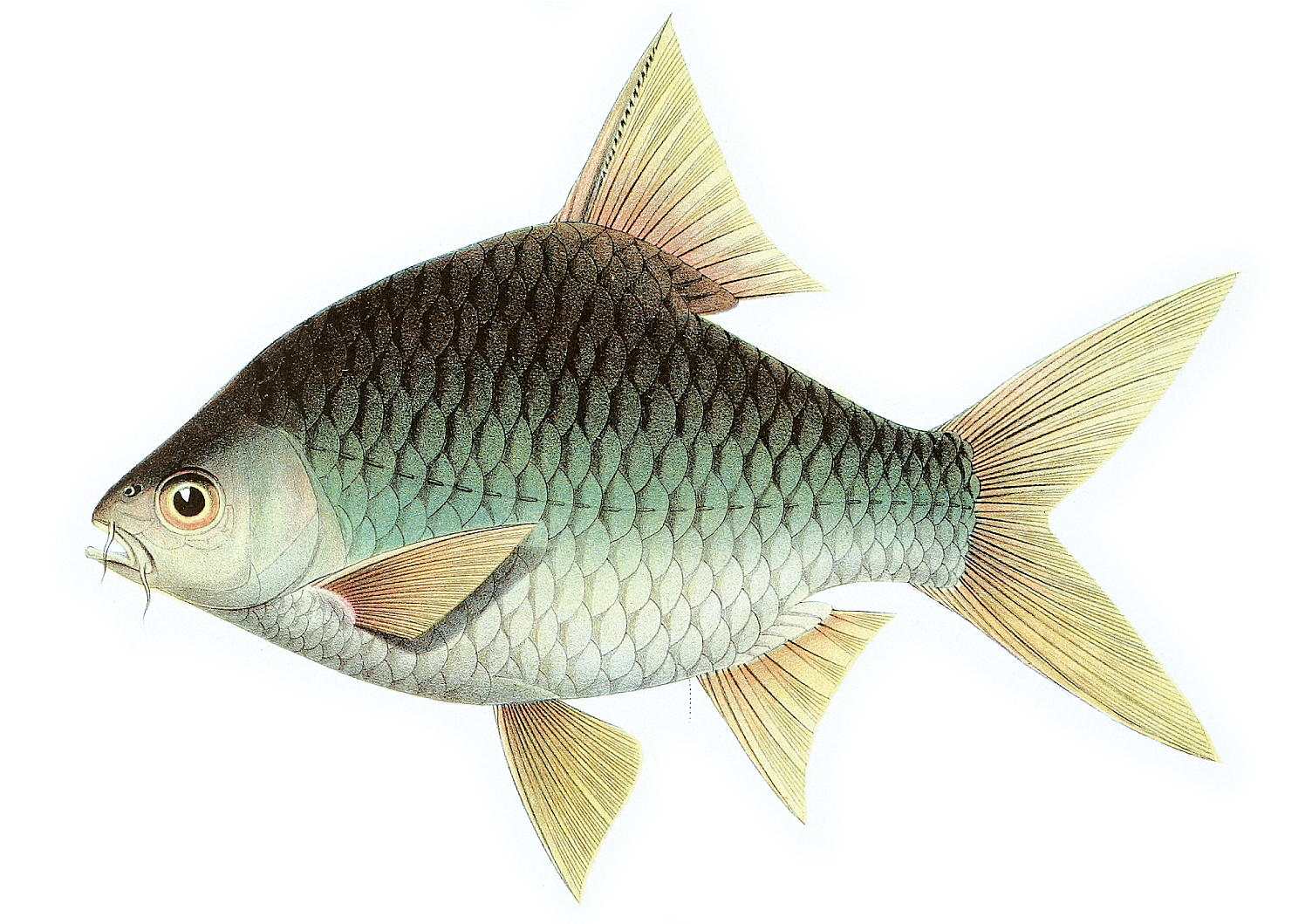

Conservation status
- Critically endangered, possibly extinct (IUCN 3.1)

Scientific classification
- Kingdom: Animalia
- Phylum: Chordata
- Class: Actinopterygii
- Order: Cypriniformes
- Family: Cyprinidae
- Genus: Barbonymus
- Species: B. platysoma

Binomial name
- Barbonymus platysoma (Bleeker, 1855)

Synonyms
- Barbus platysoma Bleeker, 1855; Barbodes platysoma (Bleeker, 1855); Puntius platysoma (Bleeker, 1855); Systomus platysoma (Bleeker, 1855)

= Barbonymus platysoma =

Species of fish

Barbonymus platysoma is a species of cyprinid fish endemic to Indonesia. This species can reach a length of 18 centimetres (7.1 in) TL.
