= Macrouridophora =

Scientific classification
- Domain: Eukaryota
- Kingdom: Animalia
- Phylum: Platyhelminthes
- Class: Monogenea
- Order: Mazocraeidea
- Family: Diclidophoridae
- Genus: Macrouridophora; Rubec & Dronen, 1994

Genus of flatworms

Macrouridophora is a genus of flatworms belonging to the family Diclidophoridae.

The species of this genus are found in Australia and Northern America.

Species:

- Macrouridophora attenuata (Mamaev & Zubchenko, 1979) Rubec & Dronen, 1994
- Macrouridophora caudata (Mamaev & Zubchenko, 1984) Rubec & Dronen, 1994
- Macrouridophora coelorhynchi (Robinson, 1961) Rubec & Dronen, 1994
- Macrouridophora halargyrea Rubec & Dronen, 1994
- Macrouridophora lotella (Machida, 1972) Rubec & Dronen, 1994
- Macrouridophora macruri (Brinkmann, 1942) Rubec & Dronen, 1994
- Macrouridophora nezumiae (Munroe, Campbell & Zwerner, 1981) Rubec & Dronen, 1994
- Macrouridophora papilio (Mamaev & Avdeev, 1981) Rubec & Dronen, 1994
- Macrouridophora paracoelorhynchi (Mamaev & Parukhin, 1979) Rubec & Dronen, 1994
- Macrouridophora physiculi (Mamaev & Avdeev, 1981) Rubec & Dronen, 1994
- Macrouridophora tubiformis (Rohde & Williams, 1987) Rubec & Dronen, 1994
