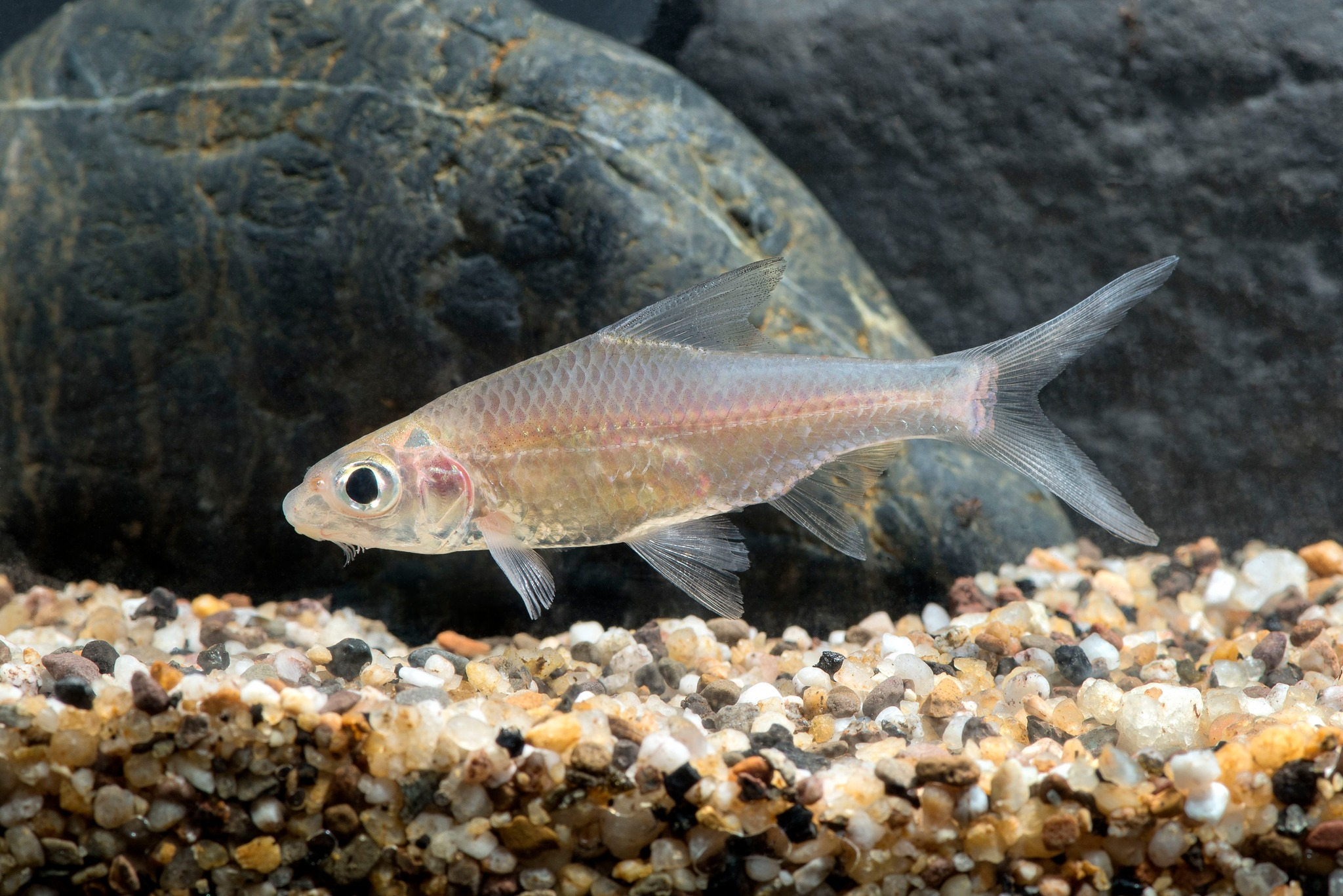

Conservation status
- Least Concern (IUCN 3.1)

Scientific classification
- Kingdom: Animalia
- Phylum: Chordata
- Class: Actinopterygii
- Order: Cypriniformes
- Family: Cyprinidae
- Genus: Cyclocheilichthys
- Species: C. heteronema

Binomial name
- Cyclocheilichthys heteronema (Bleeker, 1853)

Synonyms
- Barbus heteronema Bleeker, 1854; Oxybarbus heteronema (Bleeker, 1854)

= Cyclocheilichthys heteronema =

Species of fish

Cyclocheilichthys heteronema is a species of ray-finned fish in the genus Cyclocheilichthys. They inhabit freshwater bodies of water in the Malay Peninsula, Borneo, and the Chao Phraya and Mekong basins.

== Description ==
Growing to the maximum length of 12 cm, it is among the smallest of its genus.

A plainly colored fish but some freshly caught specimens may show a slightly bluish sheen.

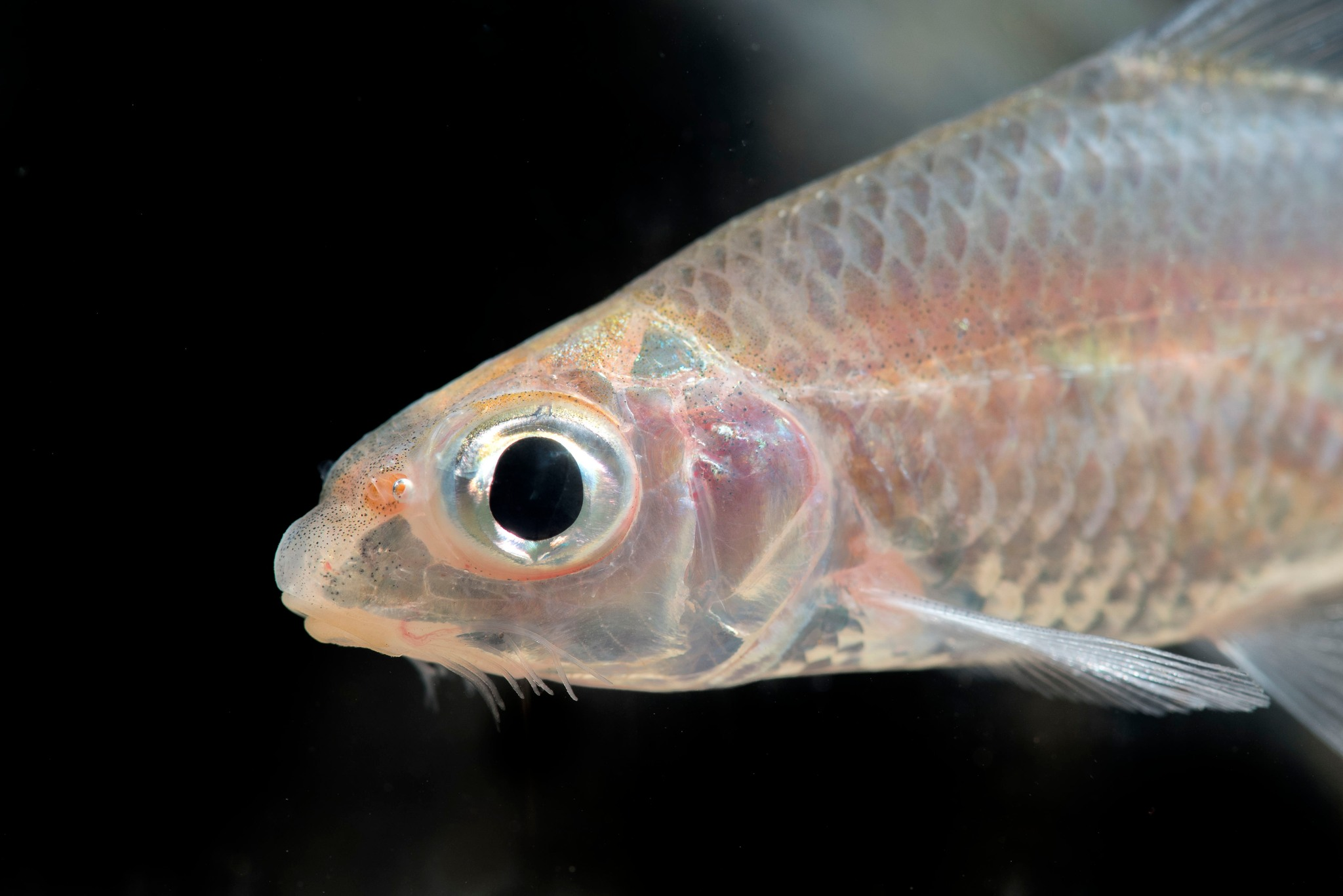
A close view of the branched maxillary barbels of C. heteronema

Its most unique characteristic is their impressively branched maxillary barbels, which they use to sift through the muddy or silty bottoms of rivers for food.
