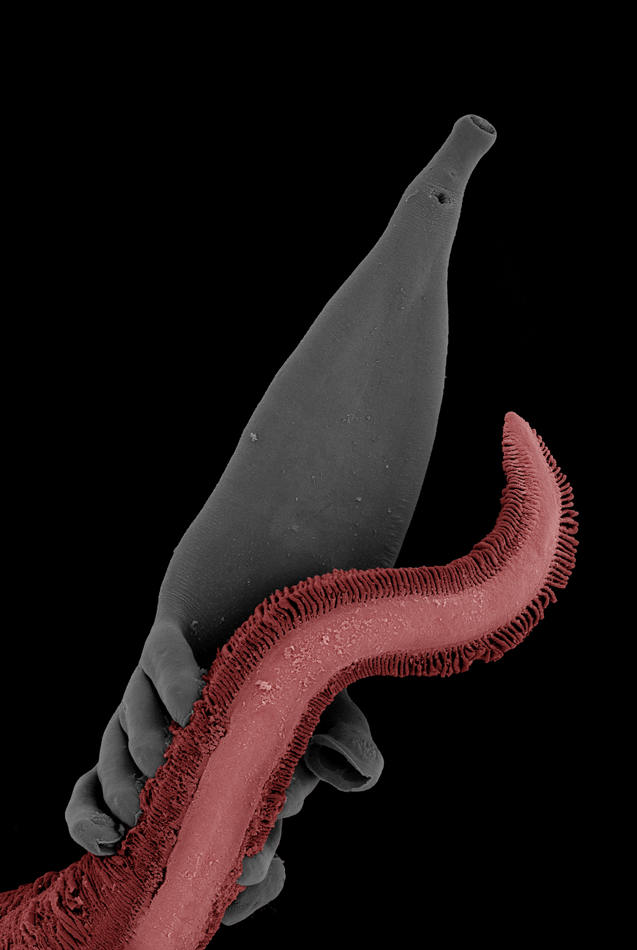
- Diclidophora denticulata.

Scientific classification
- Domain: Eukaryota
- Kingdom: Animalia
- Phylum: Platyhelminthes
- Class: Monogenea
- Order: Mazocraeidea
- Family: Diclidophoridae
- Genus: Diclidophora; Krøyer, 1838

= Diclidophora =

Genus of flatworms

Diclidophora is a genus of flatworms belonging to the family Diclidophoridae.

The genus has almost cosmopolitan distribution.

Species:

- Diclidophora caudospina Khan & Karyakarte, 1983
- Diclidophora denticulata (Olsson, 1876) Price, 1943
- Diclidophora embiotocae Hanson, 1979
- Diclidophora esmarkii (Scott, 1901) Sproston, 1946
- Diclidophora esmarkii T.Scott, 1901
- Diclidophora indica Tripathi, 1959
- Diclidophora luscae (Van Beneden & Hesse, 1863) Price, 1943
- Diclidophora maccallumi (Price, 1943) Sproston, 1946
- Diclidophora merlangi (Kuhn, 1829) Krøyer, 1838
- Diclidophora micromesisti Suriano & Martorelli, 1984
- Diclidophora minor (Olsson, 1876) Sproston, 1946
- Diclidophora minuti Tirard, Berrebi, Raibaut & Frenaud, 1992
- Diclidophora morrhuae (Van Beneden & Hesse, 1863)
- Diclidophora paddiforma Deo & Karyakarte, 1979
- Diclidophora pagelli Gallien, 1937
- Diclidophora palmata (Leuckart, 1830) Diesing, 1850
- Diclidophora phycidis (Parona & Perugia, 1889) Sproston, 1946
- Diclidophora pollachii (Van Beneden & Hesse, 1863) Price, 1943
- Diclidophora srivastavai Prakash, 2014
