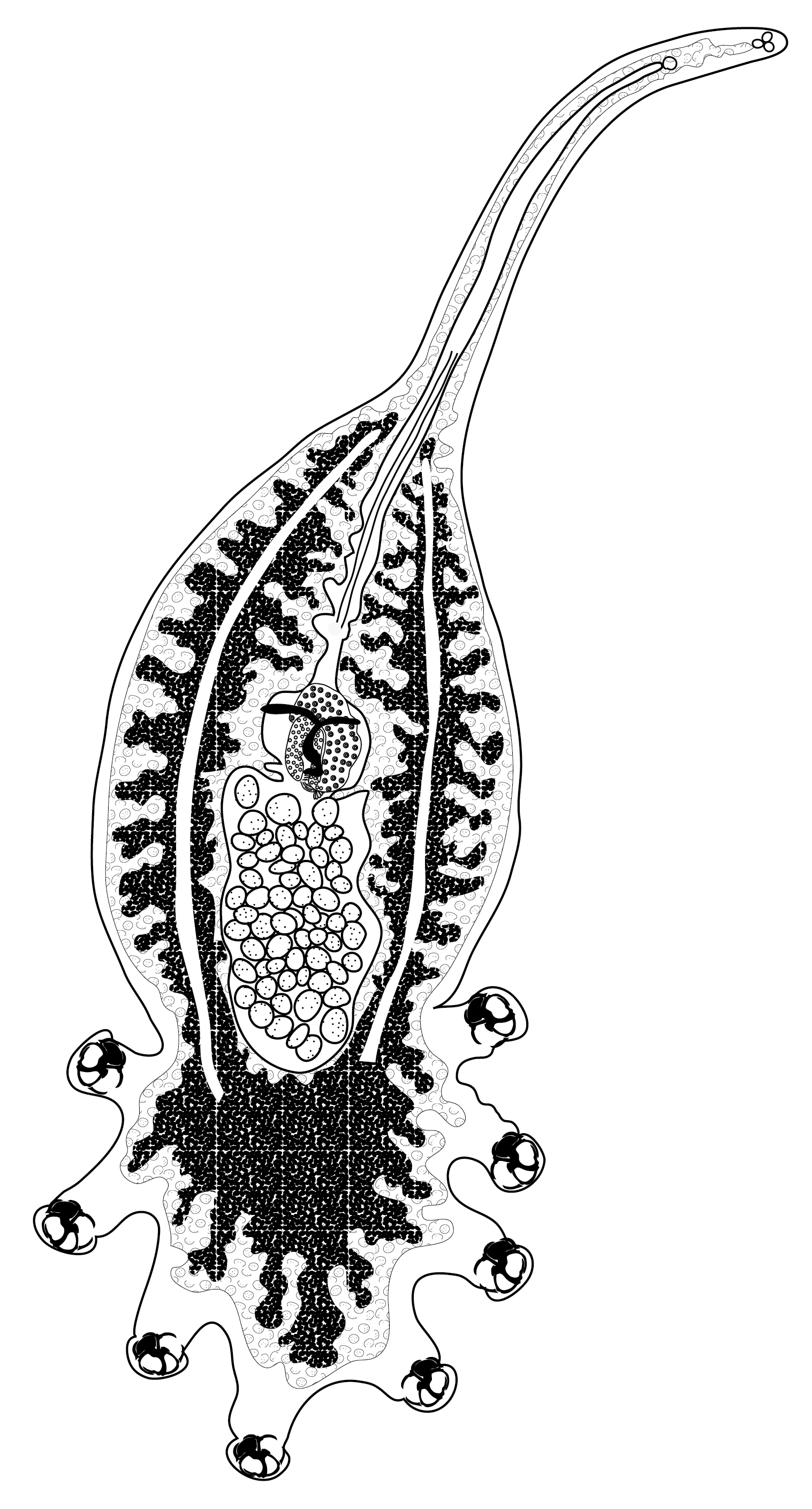
- Cyclocotyla bellones

Scientific classification
- Kingdom: Animalia
- Phylum: Platyhelminthes
- Class: Monogenea
- Order: Mazocraeidea
- Family: Diclidophoridae; Cerfontaine, 1895

= Diclidophoridae =

Family of flatworms

Diclidophoridae is a family of monogeneans within the order Mazocraeidea.

== Genera ==
Placed by WoRMS:

- Absonifibula Lawler & Overstreet, 1976
- Allodiclidophora Yamaguti, 1963
- Allotagia Dillon & Hargis, 1965
- Atlanticotyle Mamaev & Zubchenko, 1978
- Bravocotyle Lamothe-Argumedo, 1967
- Campechia Zhukov & Mamaev, 1985
- Chalguacotyle Villalba, 1987
- Choricotyle Van Beneden & Hesse, 1863
- Cyclobothrium Cerfontaine, 1895
- Cyclocotyla Otto, 1821
- Cyclocotyloides Price, 1943
- Diclidophora Krøyer, 1838
- Diclidophoropsis Gallien, 1937
- Dussumericola Unnithan, 1966
- Echinopelma Raecke, 1945
- Eurysorchis Manter & Walling, 1958
- Flexophora Prost & Euzet, 1962
- Gempylitrema Yamaguti, 1968
- Hargicotyle Mamaev, 1972
- Helciferus Mamaev, 1972
- Hemitagia Sproston, 1946
- Heterobothrioides Mamaev & Parukhin, 1975
- Heterobothrium Cerfontaine, 1895
- Hexocyclobothrium Mamaev & Aleshkina, 1984
- Inbjumia Mamaev & Parukhin, 1984
- Keralina Unnithan, 1966
- Lampanyctophilus Payne, 1986
- Lebboia Mamaev & Parukhin, 1975
- Macrouridophora Rubec & Dronen, 1994
- Macruricotyle Mamaev & Lyadov, 1975
- Mamaevicotyle Lamothe-Argumedo, 1984
- Mamaevodiclidophora Rubec, 1991
- Megaloncus Yamaguti, 1958
- Neodiclidophora Gupta & Krishna, 1980
- Neoheterobothrium Price, 1943
- Olivacotyle Cruces, Chero, Sáez, Iannacone & Luque, 2017
- Orbocotyle Euzet & Suriano, 1975
- Osphyobothrus Yamaguti, 1958
- Papillochoricotyle Mamaev, 1975
- Paracyclocotyla Dollfus, 1970
- Paraeurysorchis Tantalean, Martinez & Escalante, 1985
- Paraheterobothrium Ogawa, Itoh & Oliva, 2021
- Parapedocotyle Oliva, Sepulveda & González, 2014
- Pedocotyle MacCallum, 1913
- Polycliphora Lambert & Euzet, 1980
- Polyipnicola Mamaev & Parukhin, 1975
- Pseudoeurysorchis Caballero & Bravo-Hollis, 1962
- Sauricotyle Unnithan, 1972
- Teleurysorchis Gonzales & Sarmiento, 1990
- Tribuliphorus Mamaev & Parukhin, 1977
- Upenicola Unnithan, 1966
- Urocotyle Unnithan, 1966
- Zeicotyle Mamaev, 1976
