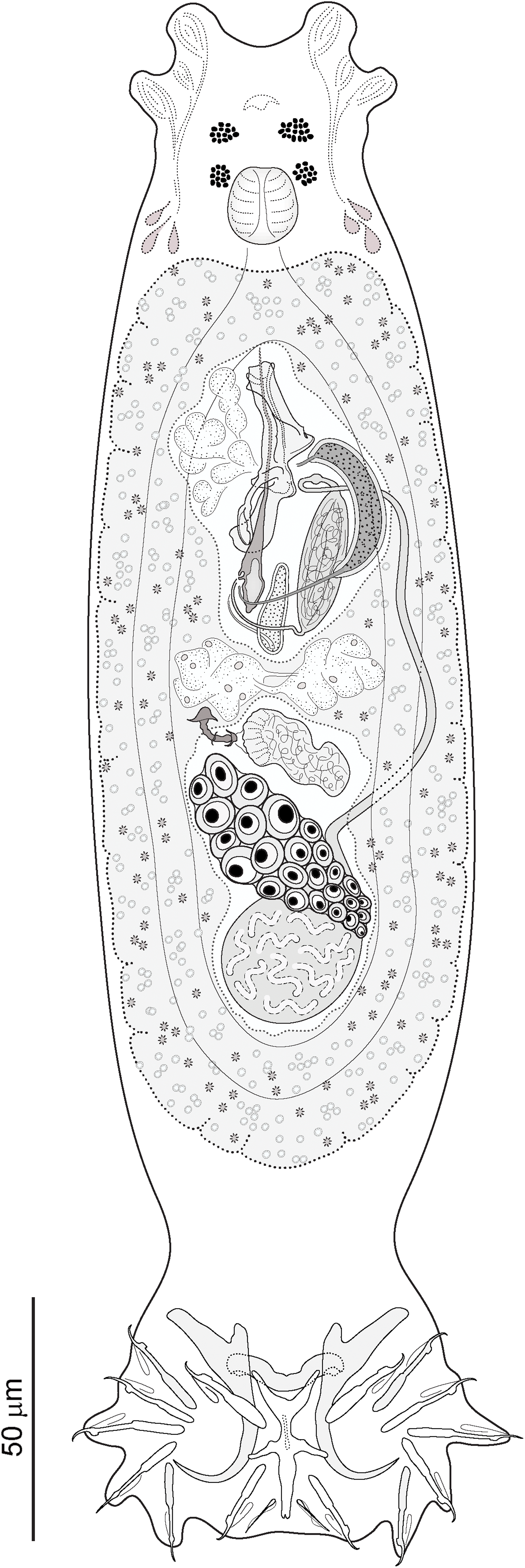

Scientific classification
- Kingdom: Animalia
- Phylum: Platyhelminthes
- Class: Monogenea
- Order: Dactylogyridea
- Family: Dactylogyridae
- Genus: Dactylogyrus; Diesing, 1850

= Dactylogyrus =

Genus of flatworms

Dactylogyrus is a genus of monogeneans in the Dactylogyridae family.

Like other monogeneans, species of Dactylogyrus only have one host required to complete their life cycle.

== Introduction ==
Members of Dactylogyrus (common name: Gill Fluke) are oviparous (egg-laying) monogeneans trematodes that have two pairs of anchors. These anchors can be used to latch onto the gills of a host, particularly freshwater fish such as carp. In heavily infected fish, Dactylogyrus can also be found on the buccal cavity, and at times fins and skin of the freshwater fish.

== Species ==
Dactylogyrus is one of the most speciose genus of helminths, with more than 900 species described, such as Dactylogyrus vastator. Consequently, in 1996, it was estimated that the taxonomy was "in a state of considerable confusion".

== Anatomy ==
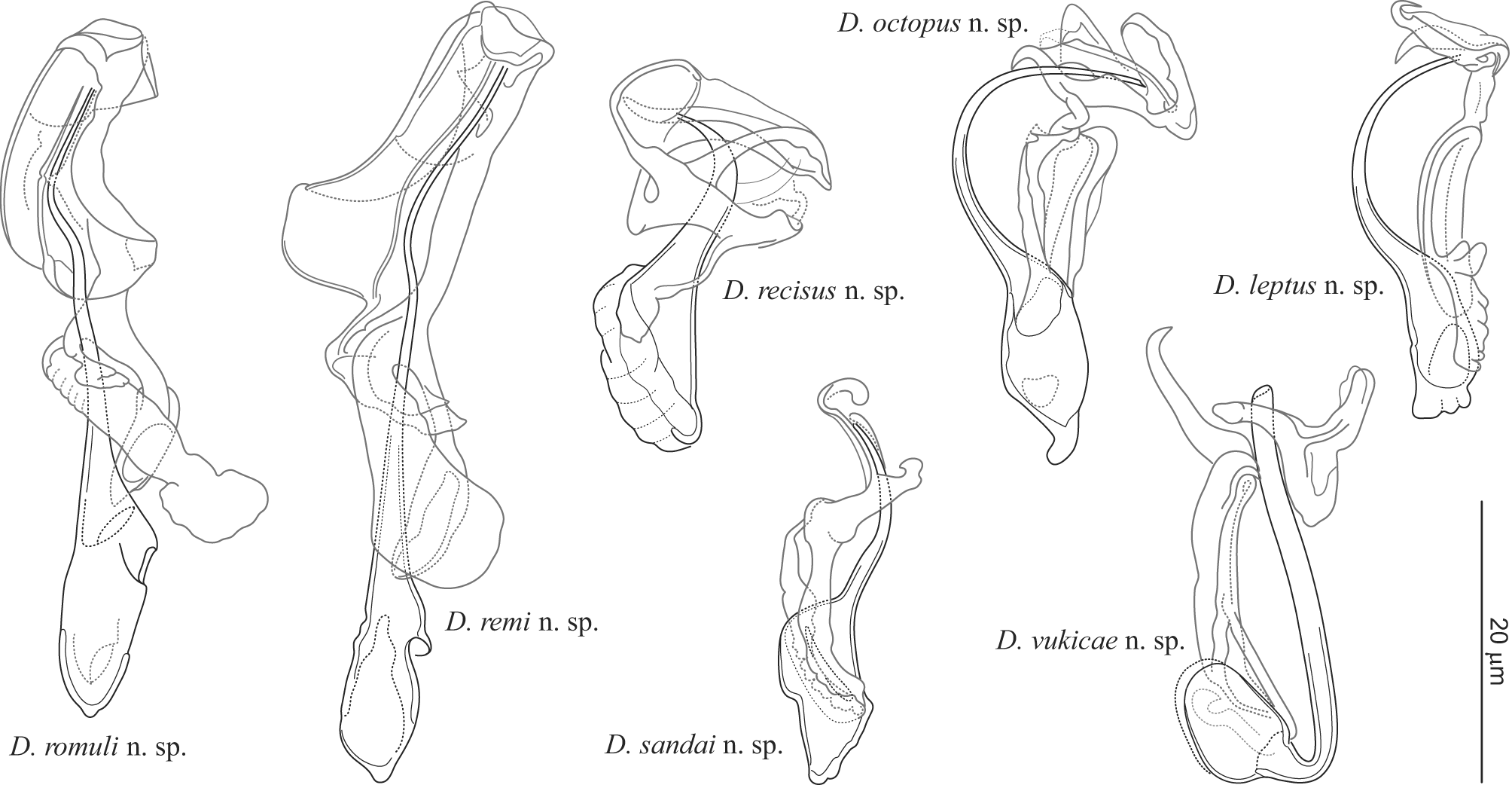
The variety of male copulatory organs in species of Dactylogyrus

Other characteristics of Dactylogyrus species include the appearance of four eye-spots, 14 marginal hooks (7 pairs), one to two connective bars and two needle-like structures and spindle-shaped dactylogyrid-type seminal vesicles. Dactylogyrus has an adult structure that is up to 2 mm in length.

== Life cycle ==
The life cycle of Dactylogyrus species is direct, having no intermediate host. The hermaphroditic adults are oviparous and produce eggs into the water which hatch prior to attaching to the gills of a fish host and developing into an oncomiracidium.

Adult Dactylogyrus lay about 4-10 eggs per day. After the eggs hatch, water currents aid the free-swimming ciliated larva in reaching its host. Once eggs are released into the water and have hatched within 4 days time period at 20 °C, the free-swimming ciliated larvae then is required to find their host within a 6–8 hours time frame in order to survive. The time required for egg maturation into the adult form is temperature dependent. Water temperatures of 72–75 °F allow life cycle completion in a few days, whereas temperatures of 34–36 °F extend the generation time to five or six months.

== Prevalence ==
Dactylogyrus species are monogenean parasites that are usually found on the gills of cyprinid fishes. The prevalence of Dactylogyrus infection on fish differ depending on the seasons. It was found that Dactylogyrus infections are at their greatest during late autumn or early winter. Correlation has also been found between the temperature of the water and the intensity of Dactylogyrus infection. It is also generally accepted that fish are exposed to increased Dactylogyrus infections during their spawning period.

== Symptoms ==
Cyprinid fish that are infected by Dactylogyrus species may have symptoms that include inflamed gills, excessive mucous secretions and accelerated respiration. Also increased movement of the gills due to damage (fibrosis) the fluke is causing to the tissues. The infected fish also becomes lethargic, swims near the surface, and its appetite decreases. Additionally the infected fish may hold its gill covers open and scratch its gills on rocks.

In severe infections, Dactylogyrus species can cause hemorrhaging and metaplasia of the gills which can lead to secondary bacterial infections and death. Heavily infected fish are also anorexic and can be found gasping for air and exhibiting abnormal behavior such as jumping out of the water.

== Treatment ==
A primary method for control of Dactylogyrus species is the application of chemicals. Treatments include Praziquantel, salt baths, formalin or organophosphates, fenbendazole, albendazole, Bromex-50 and potassium permanganate.

== Ecology and evolution ==
Species of Dactylogyrus are studied by a variety of methods, including classical morphology, staining with various dyes, scanning electron microscopy of sclerotised parts, and molecular methods.

Species of Dactylogyrus exhibit high species diversity as well as high morphological variability. For these reasons, they have been an important model for ecology and evolution of host-parasite associations of monogeneans, and of parasites in general; dozens of scientific publications have been published on these subjects. Studies on species of Dactylogyrus have highlighted aspects of the ecology of congeneric parasites, including host specificity expressed at several host levels, microhabitat specificity expressed by restricted positions on fish gills, and the link between microhabitat preference and morphological adaptation.

These studies on species of Dactylogyrus have also shown that host-specific congeneric monogeneans could reveal historical intercontinental and intracontinental contacts between freshwater fish. The importance of the role of genetic coadaptation, which limits the presence of host-specific monogeneans in hybrid fish, was also studied on species of Dactylogyrus.
