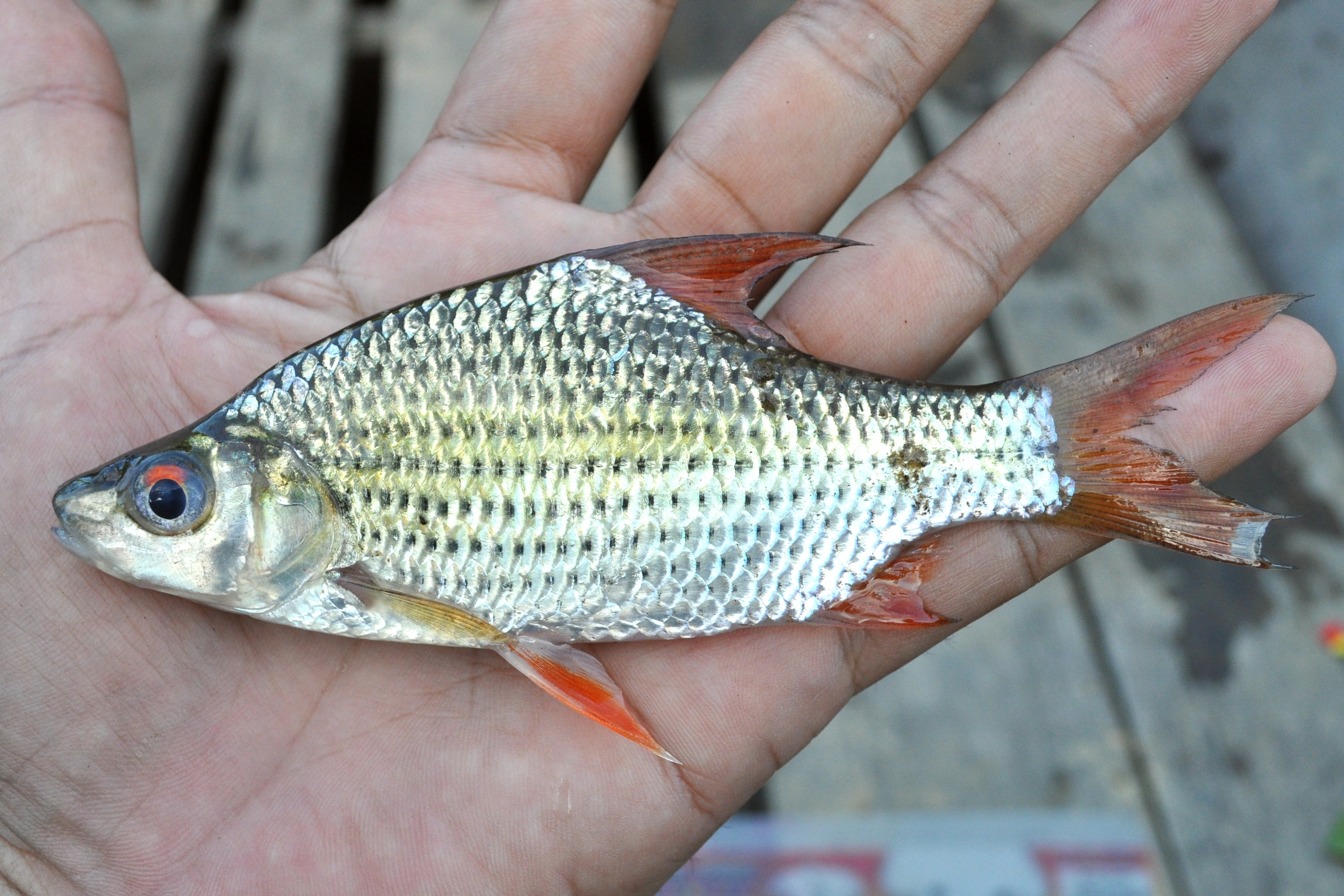
- Cyclocheilichthys apogon from Sambas, West Kalimantan, Indonesia

Scientific classification
- Kingdom: Animalia
- Phylum: Chordata
- Class: Actinopterygii
- Order: Cypriniformes
- Family: Cyprinidae
- Subfamily: Cyprininae
- Genus: Cyclocheilichthys; Bleeker, 1879

Type species
- Systomus apogon Valenciennes, 1842

Species
- see text.

Synonyms
- Anematichthys Bleeker, 1859; Oxybarbus Vaillant, 1893; Siaja Bleeker, 1859

= Cyclocheilichthys =

Genus of fishes

Cyclocheilichthys is a genus of ray-finned fish in the family Cyprinidae containing eight valid species. They are native to freshwater habitats in Southeast Asia and China.

== Species ==
Cyclocheilichthys contains the following species:

- Cyclocheilichthys apogon (Valenciennes, 1842) (Beardless Barb)
- Cyclocheilichthys armatus (Valenciennes, 1842)
- Cyclocheilichthys heteronema (Bleeker, 1854)
- Cyclocheilichthys janthochir (Bleeker, 1854)
- Cyclocheilichthys lagleri Sontirat, 1985
- Cyclocheilichthys repasson (Bleeker, 1853)
- Cyclocheilichthys schoppeae Cervancia & Kottelat, 2007
- Cyclocheilichthys sinensis Bleeker, 1879
