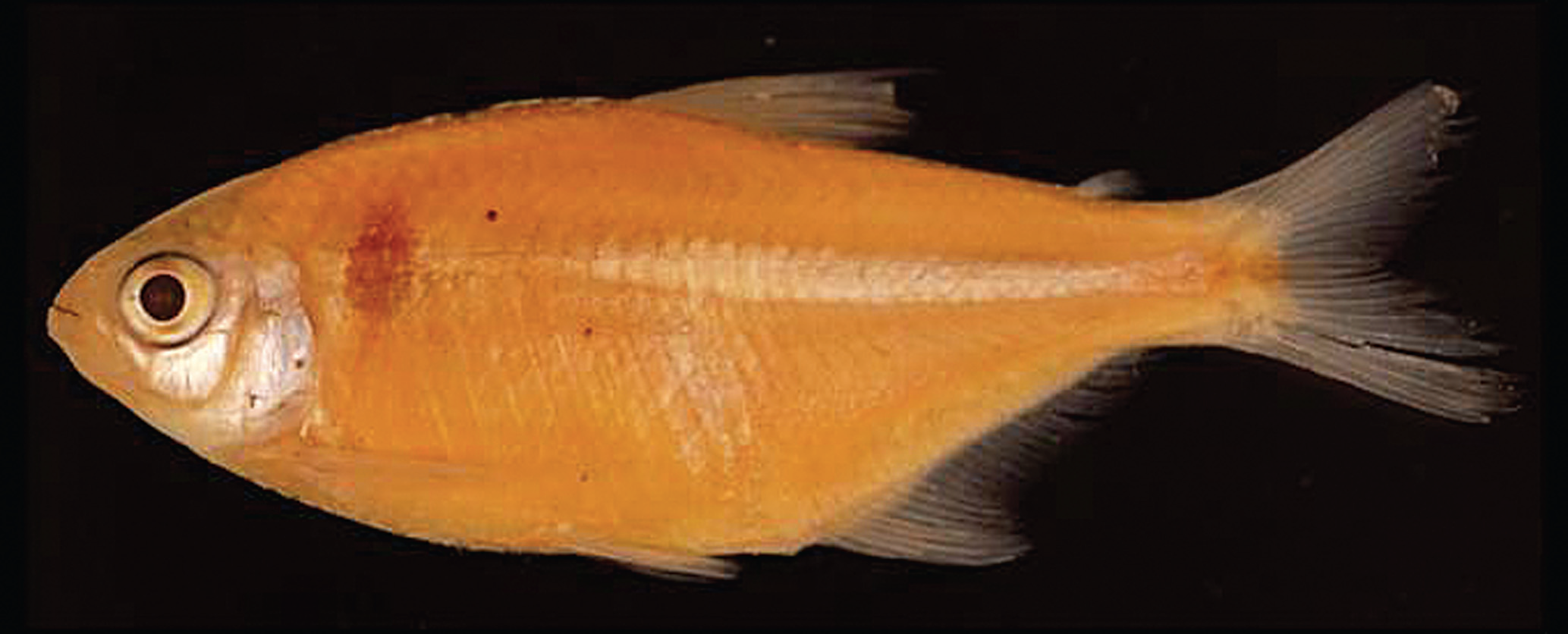

Conservation status
- Least Concern (IUCN 3.1)

Scientific classification
- Kingdom: Animalia
- Phylum: Chordata
- Class: Actinopterygii
- Order: Characiformes
- Family: Acestrorhamphidae
- Genus: Deuterodon
- Species: D. sazimai

Binomial name
- Deuterodon sazimai (Santos & Castro, 2014)

Synonyms
- Probolodus sazimai Santos & Castro, 2014

= Deuterodon sazimai =

Species of fish

Deuterodon sazimai is a small freshwater fish endemic to a handful of river basins in southeastern Brazil. Upon being first described, it was considered a member of genus Probolodus; Probolodus is now considered obsolete, synonymized with Deuterodon. Much like other members of Deuterodon, and like some species in related genera like Astyanax or Jupiaba, D. oyakawai is a silvery fish with fins in some combination of red and clear. It sports a wedge-shaped humeral spot, and an oval-shaped blotch on its tail joint.

This species demonstrates lepidophagy, or scale-eating, which is not uncommon in closely related congeners. Its most likely targets include other members of Deuterodon. Its diet is occasionally supplemented by leaves and insects, though these are rare additions. Further details, regarding aspects such as behavior and biotope preferences, are sparse.

== Taxonomy ==
Deuterodon sazimai was originally described as Probolodus sazimai upon nomination by a Brazilian research team in 2014. Some databases, such as GBIF and the Encyclopedia of Life, still list it as a member of Probolodus. However, the genera Probolodus and Myxiops were synonymized with Deuterodon as part of a 2020 study that closely examined the phylogeny of Astyanax and related groups, such as Psalidodon, Andromakhe, Makunaima, and Deuterodon itself. This updated classification is reflected in databases like FishBase, the World Register of Marine Species, and Eschmeyer's Catalog of Fishes.

=== Etymology ===
The genus name "Deuterodon" is Greek. It comes from "deuteros", which means "second" or "repeated", and "odon", which means "tooth"; this is in reference to the similarity of all teeth in the lower jaw. The specific name "sazimai" honors Ivan Sazima, an ichthyologist from the Museu de Zoologia, Universidade Estadual de Campinas of São Paulo, Brazil. Sazima is notable for contributions to the knowledge of neotropical lepidophagous characiform fishes.

== Description ==
Deuterodon sazimai is a small fish, reaching a maximum of 5.7 cm (2.2 in) SL (standard length, with the tail fin left out of the measurement). The body is somewhat compressed and deep; this is more evident in smaller specimens, and body depth can vary between populations, though there is significant overlap between those located near each other. The lateral line has 36–43 pored scales, which can be used to differentiate it from congeners; D. heterostomus, for instance, has 45–56 scales therein. There are 11 dorsal-fin rays, 26–32 anal-fin rays, 12–13 pectoral-fin rays, 7–8 ventral-fin rays, and 19 caudal-fin rays.

The coloration in life is generally similar to relatives such as Deuterodon heterostomus and Deuterodon oyakawai, with a base silver and fins that are reddish or clear. When preserved in alcohol, the base color changes to a yellowish-brown, with some remaining silver due to guanine. The back darkens to a brownish color because of the chromatophores concentrated in the middle and base of the scales (lacking at the margins), and the body remains pale below the lateral line. There is a large, wedge-shaped humeral spot, and a dark lateral stripe that leads to another blotch of pigment on the caudal peduncle, shaped like a horizontal oval.

=== Sexual dimorphism ===
Large, mature males may develop backwards-facing bony hooks on some rays of the anal fin.

== Distribution and ecology ==
Deuterodon sazimai is known to occur in the basins of the Itapemirim and Doce rivers, which are located in the Espírito Santo and Minas Gerais states of southeastern Brazil, respectively.

The Itapemirim river flows from west to east for roughly 320 km (200 mi), encompassing a drainage area of about 6,014 km^{2} (2,322 sq mi). The Doce river basin is located further north along the Atlantic coastline, and flows for about 853 km (530 mi); the ecosystem therein is considered sensitive to climate variability.

=== Diet ===
The diet of D. sazimai is almost entirely made up of scales from other fish, which have been found extensively in the stomach contents of examined specimens. This is a specialized feeding behavior known as lepidophagy. Other dietary contributors, much less prevalent than scales, have been found in the mouths of preserved specimens on occasion; these include leaf fragments and insects.

== Conservation status ==
Deuterodon sazimai has classified as 'Least concern' the IUCN. It is a widespread species, which increases survivability, but it currently inhabits regions known to be the subject of pollution; for example, the Doce River suffered the Mariana dam disaster, a catastrophic dam collapse, in 2015. This event released 43.7 million cubic meters of mine tailings into the Doce River, and the resultant toxic mudflow polluted the river and beaches for years afterwards. The Itapemirim also faces anthropogenic survival pressures, including contamination by aluminum and copper. Fish and plants near the river have been recorded in notably worse health as a result of metal toxicity, and the water quality of the river overall is considered to be suboptimal.
