= Carl Duncan =

Carl Duncan may refer to:

- Carl Porter Duncan (1921–1999), professor of experimental psychology
- Carl D. Duncan, botanist and entomologist
