= Martin Ralph Brittan =

American ichthyologist (1922-2008)

- Born: January 28, 1922; San Jose, California, U.S.
- Died: May 24, 2008; Folsom, California, U.S.
- Education: San José State University; Stanford University
- Known for: Taxonomic studies of the genus Rasbora
- Scientific career
- Fields: Ichthyology
- Workplaces: California State University, Sacramento
- Author abbrev. (zoology): Brittan

Martin Ralph "Marty" Brittan (January 28, 1922 – May 24, 2008), also cited as Martin R. Brittan, was an American ichthyologist.

== Biography ==
Brittan was the son of Ralph Hinton and Addie Belle Brittan (née Martin). His father was a businessman in paints and interior decoration, and his mother was a homemaker. At about the age of ten, Brittan developed a lifelong fascination with aquarium fish, which became the focus of his professional life. With encouragement from a schoolmate, he used the money he earned as a paperboy to buy and breed ornamental fishes. He quickly learned the behavioral traits of different species and adapted his breeding methods accordingly. He also became familiar with magazines such as The Aquarium, edited at the time by George Sprague Myers, and books like Exotic Aquarium Fishes by William T. Innes.

In 1935, when Brittan was 13, both of his parents, his grandmother, and an uncle died. He and his younger brother were then raised by an aunt in San Jose, California, with the support of other relatives. There he attended high school, where his interest in nature was encouraged and he was introduced to botany and ornithology.

Brittan entered San José State College in 1940, first considering art before deciding on the biological sciences. There he studied under ornithologist Gayle Benjamin Pickwell and botanist Carl D. Duncan. In September 1942 he joined the U.S. Army Enlisted Reserve Corps and was called to active duty in April 1943. He served mainly in the clinical laboratories of the U.S. Army Medical Department, first at the Oakland Regional Hospital in California, then at the Fitzsimons Army Medical Center in Denver, Colorado, working as a lab technician and assisting with autopsies until his discharge in May 1946.

After his military service, Brittan returned to San José State College, earning his bachelor’s degree in 1946. He continued his studies in ichthyology at Stanford University under the G.I. Bill. During the summer of 1947, while working as a park ranger in Yosemite National Park, he met Ruth Luebke. They married that August and had two daughters, Penelope Sue (b. 1948) and Pamela Lynne Stevens (married to Robert Henry "Hank" Stevens, b. 1950) (1949–1975).

His first scientific paper, “The Chipmunks of the Yosemite Region,” appeared in 1948. In 1951 he earned his Ph.D. with the dissertation Contributions to a Revision of the Cyprinid Genus Rasbora, focusing on the cyprinid genus Rasbora. Expecting about twenty valid species, he ultimately confirmed forty-five, nine of them new to science. His dissertation was published in 1954 as A Revision of the Indo-Malayan Fresh-Water Fish Genus Rasbora, with a revised edition in 1971. In 1958 he received a plaque from the International Federation of Aquarium Societies for his outstanding work on the genus Rasbora.

In 1949 he became an assistant professor at the South Dakota School of Mines and Technology in Rapid City, South Dakota. From 1950 to 1953 he was a lecturer in biology at San Diego State College, and afterward joined the faculty at California State University, Sacramento (then Sacramento State College), where he taught for forty years. He became associate professor in 1956 and full professor in 1962, retiring in June 1993. At Sacramento State, Brittan taught ichthyology, general biology, zoology, ecology, evolution, freshwater biology, marine biology, fisheries science, biological conservation, and zoogeography. He also taught at the Moss Landing Marine Laboratories. His teaching frequently included field trips to mountain, desert, and coastal regions. During the environmental movement of the 1970s and 1980s, Brittan and Joye Harold Severaid expanded the university curriculum to include new courses in ecology, fisheries biology, aquatic biology, wildlife biology, and biogeography.

Brittan led field courses to Alaska, Mexico, Central America, and the Caribbean. He was the first Sacramento State professor to lead study programs abroad, including three trips to Europe, as well as expeditions to Africa, India, South America, Asia, and Hawaii. He conducted fieldwork on coral reef fishes in Palau, Yap, and Saipan in 1956, supported by the George Vanderbilt Foundation at Stanford University. He also joined expeditions to Alaska (1959), Mexico (1952, 1979), Brazil (1964, 1966, 1974), and Costa Rica (1962, 1973). In 1991 he was a visiting professor at Khon Kaen University in Thailand, where he lectured and conducted research. He also worked as an environmental consultant for several agencies, including in Merced, California, for Tudor Engineering Company (1965–66), and for Salvita Acuario in Belém, Brazil (1968–70). Brittan maintained a close forty-year friendship with ichthyologist Herbert R. Axelrod. With Axelrod’s financial support, he participated in an expedition to the Amazon Basin in 1964 and later joined other collecting trips to South America and Europe. Many of his reports and illustrations appeared in Axelrod’s magazine Tropical Fish Hobbyist.

He was a member of the American Society of Ichthyologists and Herpetologists, the American Fisheries Society, the Neotropical Biology Association, the Desert Fishes Council, the Western Society of Naturalists, the Pacific Fisheries Biologists, and the Gilbert Ichthyological Society. He was also active in several conservation organizations, including the Sierra Club, the Natural Resources Defense Council, The Nature Conservancy, and the National Parks Conservation Association.

== Eponymous taxa ==
Several species were named in his honor:

- Brittanichthys (Géry, 1965)
- Kottelatia brittani (Axelrod, 1978)
- Horadandia brittani (Rema Devi & Menon, 1992)

== Species described by Brittan ==
- Rasbora bunguranensis (Brittan, 1951)
- Rasbora sarawakensis (Brittan, 1951)
- Rasbora aprotaenia (Hubbs & Brittan, 1954)
- Rasbora baliensis (Hubbs & Brittan, 1954)
- Rasbora hubbsi (Brittan, 1954)
- Rasbora myersi (Brittan, 1954)
- Rasbora nematotaenia (Hubbs & Brittan, 1954)
- Rasbora spilotaenia (Hubbs & Brittan, 1954)
- Rasbora tubbi (Brittan, 1954)
- Rasboroides (Brittan, 1954)
- Stygichthys typhlops (Brittan & Böhlke, 1965)
- Sundadanio axelrodi (Brittan, 1976)
