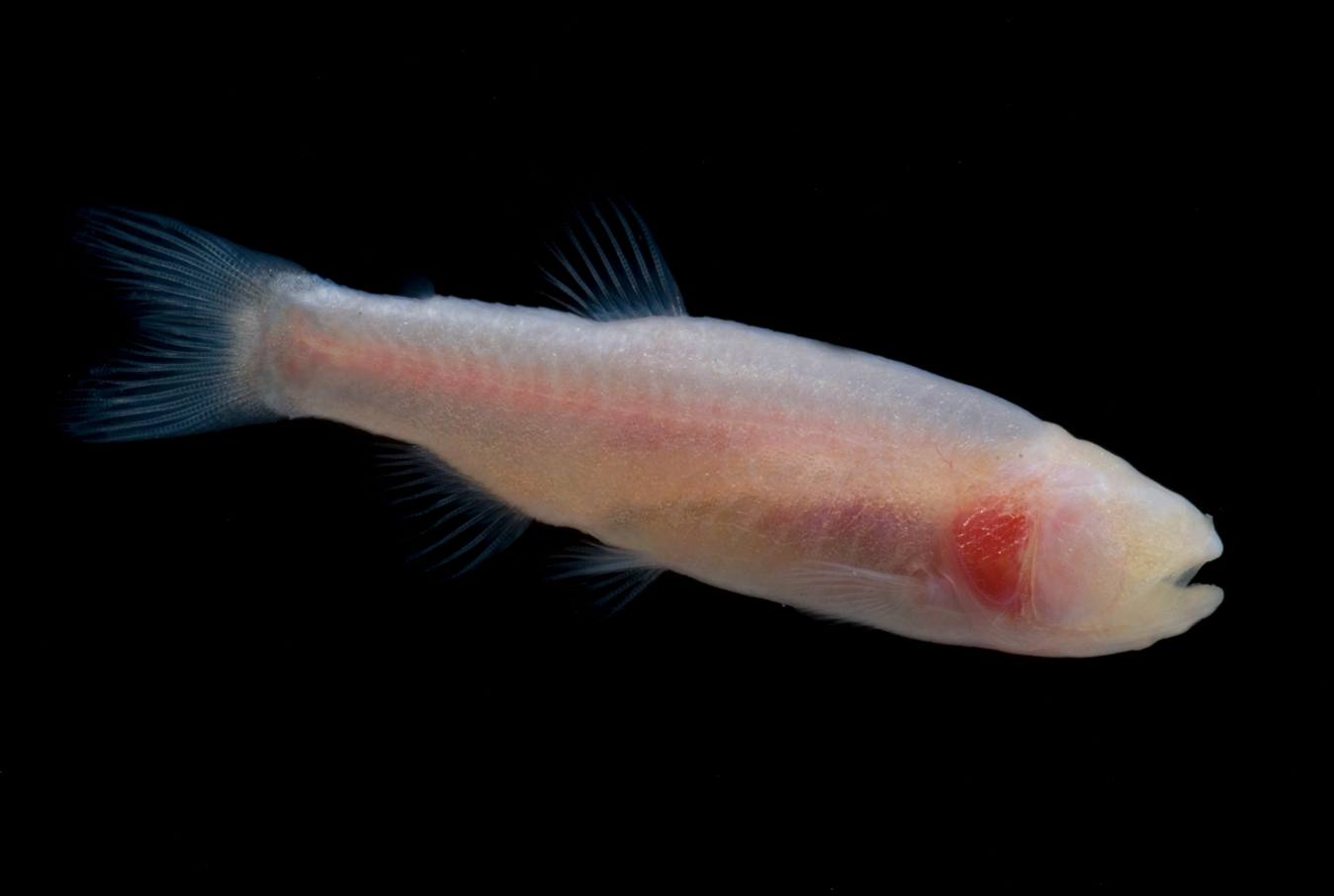
- Stygichthys typhlops

Scientific classification
- Kingdom: Animalia
- Phylum: Chordata
- Class: Actinopterygii
- Division: Teleostei
- Order: Characiformes
- Family: Acestrorhamphidae
- Subfamily: Stygichthyinae; Géry, 1972

Type genus
- Stygichthys Brittan & Böhlke, 1965

Genera
- See text

= Stygichthyinae =

Subfamily of fishes

Stygichthyinae is a subfamily of freshwater ray-finned fishes belonging to the family Acestrorhamphidae, the American tetras. The fishes in this subfamily are found in South America.

== Genera ==
Stygichthyinae contains the following genera:

- Coptobrycon Géry, 1966
- Deuterodon C. H. Eigenmann, 1907
- Myxiops Zanata & Akama, 2004
- Stygichthys Brittan & Böhlke, 1965
