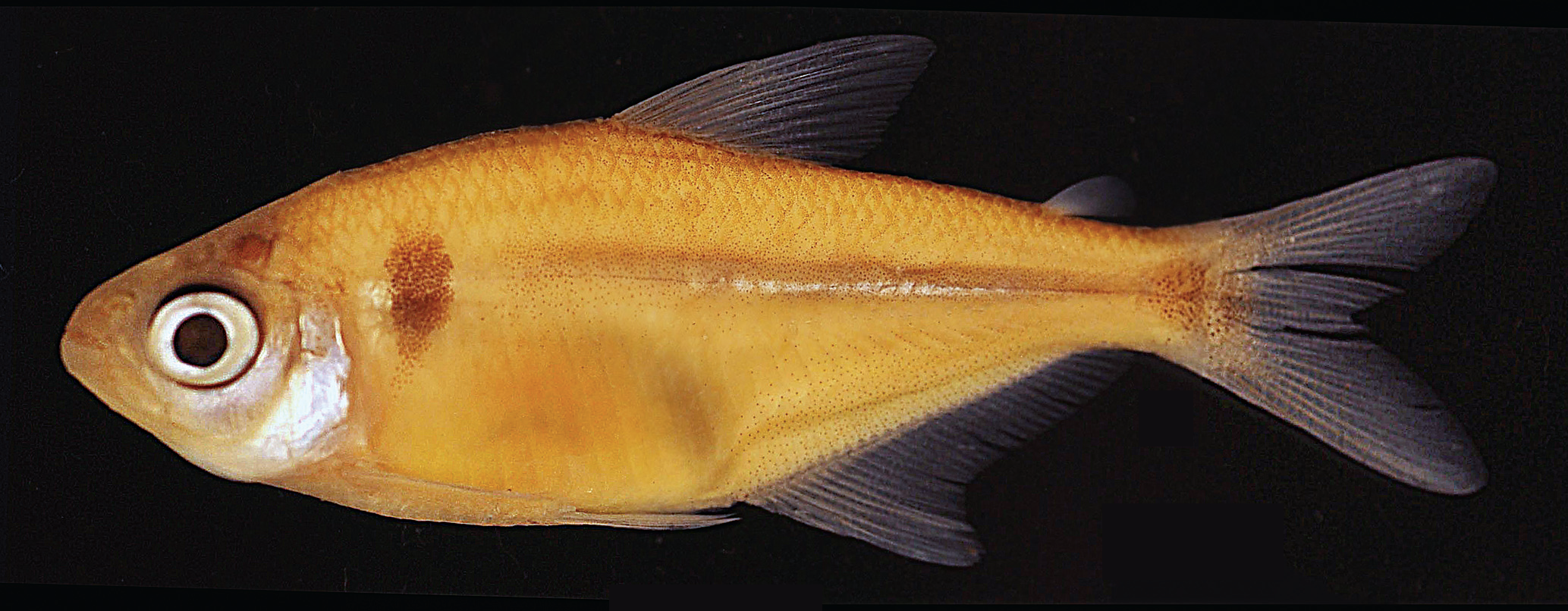

Conservation status
- Least Concern (IUCN 3.1)

Scientific classification
- Kingdom: Animalia
- Phylum: Chordata
- Class: Actinopterygii
- Order: Characiformes
- Family: Acestrorhamphidae
- Genus: Deuterodon
- Species: D. oyakawai

Binomial name
- Deuterodon oyakawai (Santos & Castro, 2014)

Synonyms
- Probolodus oyakawai Santos & Castro, 2014

= Deuterodon oyakawai =

Species of fish

Deuterodon oyakawai is a small species of characin endemic to a large river basin along the Atlantic coast in southeast Brazil. It was originally one of three members of the genus Probolodus, but Probolodus is now considered obsolete, synonymized with Deuterodon. Much like other members of Deuterodon, and like some species in related genera, D. oyakawai is a small, silvery fish with fins in some combination of red and clear. It has a defined humeral spot that can be used for identification.

Upon its nomination, congener Deuterodon heterostomus was considered the only member of the genus Probolodus, but D. oyakawai (and D. sazimai) were established therein in 2014. Prior to this, specimens of D. oyakawai were likely mislabeled as D. heterostomus. All three species were moved to the genus Deuterodon upon a phyletic review in 2020. All three species are also noted to perform lepidophagy, which is a specialized feeding behavior that involves eating the scales of other fish.

== Taxonomy ==
When originally described by a Brazilian research team in 2014, D. oyakawai was designated Probolodus oyakawai. It can still be found listed under the genus Probolodus in some databases, such as GBIF or the Encyclopedia of Life. However, the genera Probolodus and Myxiops were synonymized with Deuterodon in a 2020 study that closely examined the phylogeny of Astyanax and related groups, such as Psalidodon, Andromakhe, Makunaima, and Deuterodon itself. This updated classification is reflected in databases including FishBase, the World Register of Marine Species, and Eschmeyer's Catalog of Fishes. Its recent reclassification makes discrepancies between databases unsurprising.

Before its nomination, instances of D. oyakawai were likely cataloged as congener D. heterostomus, specifically in the Ribeira de Iguape river basin.

=== Etymology ===
The genus name "Deuterodon" originates in Greek. Its roots are "deuteros", which means "second" or "repeated", and "odon", which means "tooth"; this is in reference to the similarity of all teeth in the lower jaw. The specific name "oyakawai" honors Osvaldo T. Oyakawa, an ichthyologist from the Museu de Zoologia da Universidade de São Paulo, who collected multiple type specimens. Oyakawa is also notable for his major contributions to the knowledge of the fishes that inhabit the Ribeira de Iguape river basin.

== Description ==
Deuterodon oyakawai reaches a maximum of 6.4 cm (2.5 in) SL (standard length, without the tail fin included). The body is somewhat compressed and deep; this is more evident in smaller specimens, and body depth can vary between populations, though there is significant overlap between those located near each other. There are 41–43 pored scales in the lateral line. The dorsal fin has 11 rays, the anal fin 26–32, the pectoral 11–13, the pelvic 8–9, and the caudal fin 19.

When preserved in formalin, most of the body turns a yellowish-brown, with some guanine retaining elements of its original silver. There are darker-brown portions on the top of the head and on the back, and there is a large, wedge-shaped humeral spot with its widest end towards the back of the body that extends both above and below the lateral line. There is a dark midlateral stripe down each side, and a conspicuous blotch of pigment on the caudal peduncle that continues onto the median rays of the caudal fin. In life, the fish is silver, and the fins are reddish-to-clear (which are features it shares with congener Deuterodon heterostomus).

=== Sexual dimorphism ===
Larger males may develop backwards-facing hooks on select rays of the pelvic fin when mature.

== Distribution and ecology ==
Deuterodon oyakawai is known to inhabit the Ribeira de Iguape river basin, which lies in southeastern Brazil. The river itself reaches above 100 m (330 ft) in elevation, and stretches from mountainous to coastal terrain. The climate of the region is generally warm, with high rainfall and mild winters.

=== Diet ===
Deuterodon oyakawai is a noted lepidophage - that is, a fish that eats the scales of other fish. Scales of varying types (ctenoid and cycloid) have been found in the stomach contents of examined specimens, which indicates differing sources of food rather than preferential treatment. However, likely sources of scales may include congeners Deuterodon ribierae and Deuterodon iguape, with which it is sympatric.

== Conservation status ==
Deuterodon oyakawai has not received an evaluation from the IUCN. However, it is a widespread and hardy species, and much of its native range is already protected; large swathes of the Atlantic Forest are preserved as national parks. Nonetheless, threats to the aquatic wildlife of the region are present, including exotic species and illegal deforestation.
