= Rasbora nematotaenia =

Conservation status
- Data Deficient (IUCN 3.1)

Scientific classification
- Kingdom: Animalia
- Phylum: Chordata
- Class: Actinopterygii
- Order: Cypriniformes
- Family: Danionidae
- Genus: Rasbora
- Species: R. nematotaenia

Binomial name
- Rasbora nematotaenia Hubbs & Brittan, 1954

Species of fish

Rasbora nematotaenia is a species of freshwater ray-finned fish in the genus Rasbora. It is endemic to Indonesia.
