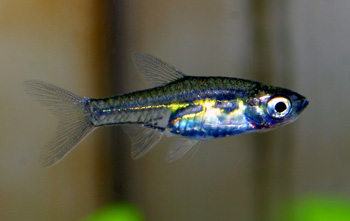
- Horadandia atukorali

Scientific classification
- Kingdom: Animalia
- Phylum: Chordata
- Class: Actinopterygii
- Order: Cypriniformes
- Suborder: Cyprinoidei
- Family: Danionidae
- Subfamily: Rasborinae
- Genus: Horadandia; Deraniyagala, 1943

Type species
- Horadandia atukorali Deraniyagala, 1943

= Horadandia =

Genus of fishes

Horadandia is a genus of freshwater ray-finned fish belonging to the family Danionidae. The fishes in this genus are from South Asia.

== Species ==
There are two recognized species:

- Horadandia atukorali Deraniyagala, 1943 – Sri Lanka
- Horadandia brittani Rema Devi and Menon, 1992 – India

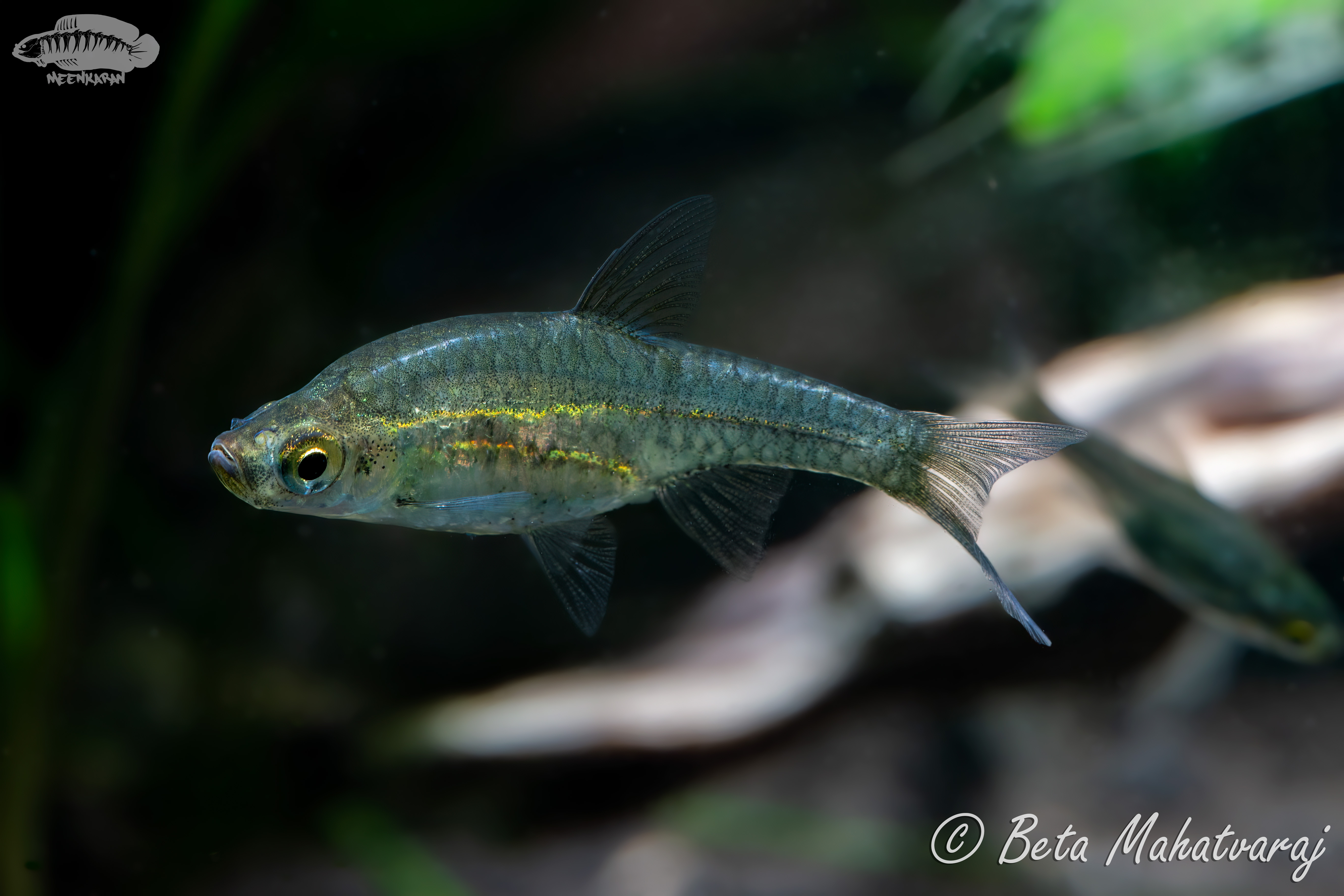
Horadandia brittani
