= Myxiops aphos =

Conservation status
- Least Concern (IUCN 3.1)

Scientific classification
- Kingdom: Animalia
- Phylum: Chordata
- Class: Actinopterygii
- Order: Characiformes
- Family: Acestrorhamphidae
- Genus: Myxiops
- Species: M. aphos

Binomial name
- Myxiops aphos Zanata & Akama, 2004

Species of fish

Myxiops aphos is a species of freshwater ray-finned fish belonging to the family Acestrorhamphidae, the American tetras. This fish is endemic to Brazil, where it is found in the Lençois River, a tributary of the Paraguaçu in Bahia.
