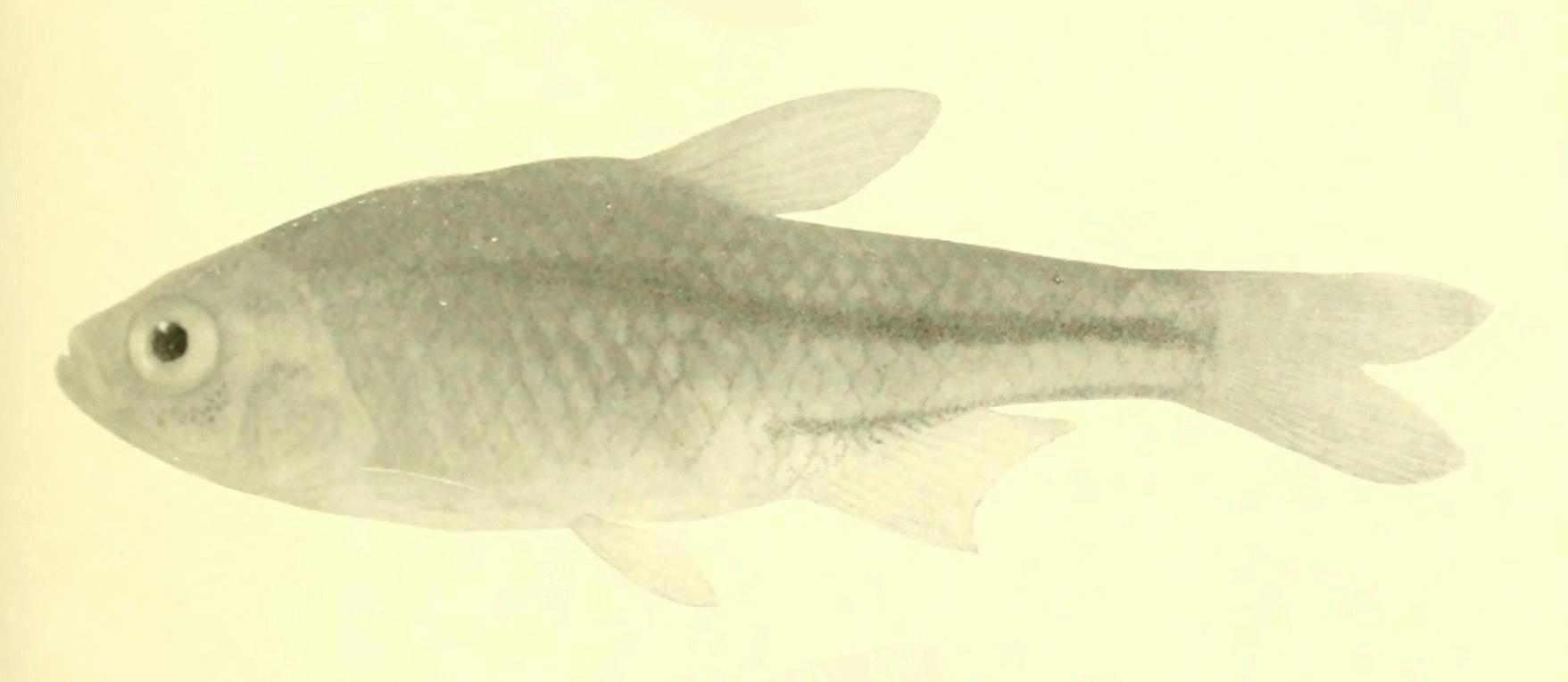

Conservation status
- Least Concern (IUCN 3.1)

Scientific classification
- Kingdom: Animalia
- Phylum: Chordata
- Class: Actinopterygii
- Order: Characiformes
- Family: Acestrorhamphidae
- Subfamily: Stygichthyinae
- Genus: Coptobrycon; Géry, 1966
- Species: C. bilineatus

Binomial name
- Coptobrycon bilineatus (Ellis, 1911)

Synonyms
- Hasemania bilineata Ellis, 1911

= Coptobrycon =

Genus of fishes

Coptobrycon is a monospecific genus of freshwater ray-finned fish belonging to the family Acestrorhamphidae, the American tetras. The only species in this genus is Coptobrycon bilineatus, a species which is endemic to Brazil, where it is known to occur in the upper Tietê River basin and in coastal basins that drain the Serra do Mar near the municipalities of Mogi das Cruzes and Bertioga in São Paulo state. It is found in clear water with abundant aquatic vegetation and submerged tree trunks, where it lives in shoals. Its diet is mainly plant matter, with some animals eaten as well. It appears that this fish may spawn throughout the year. C. bilineatus has a maximum total length of 4.1 cm (1.6 in).
