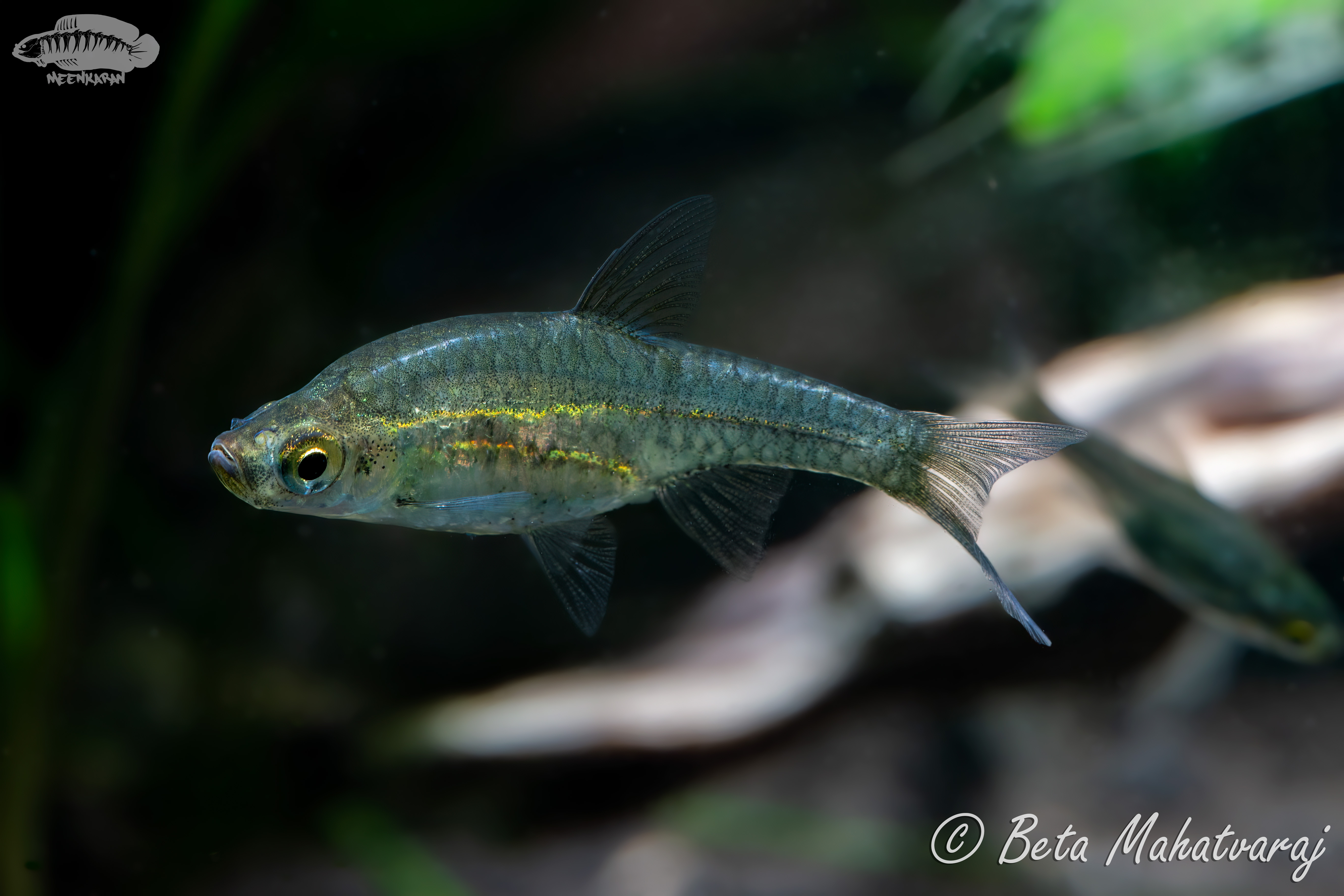

Scientific classification
- Kingdom: Animalia
- Phylum: Chordata
- Class: Actinopterygii
- Order: Cypriniformes
- Family: Danionidae
- Subfamily: Rasborinae
- Genus: Horadandia
- Species: H. brittani

Binomial name
- Horadandia brittani Rema Devi & Menon, 1992

Synonyms
- Horadandia atukorali brittani Rema Devi & Menon, 1992

= Horadandia brittani =

Species of fish

Horadandia brittani is a species of very small freshwater ray-finned fish belonging to the family Danionidae. This species is endemic to coastal floodplains in South India. Originally described as a subspecies of H. atukorali, it was elevated to species level in 2013. It can grow to 2 cm (0.79 in) standard length.

== Etymology ==
The fish is named in honor of American ichthyologist Martin R. Brittan (1922–2008), who provided the specimens, the biometric data and the literature, and for critically reviewing the authors’ manuscript regarding the description.
