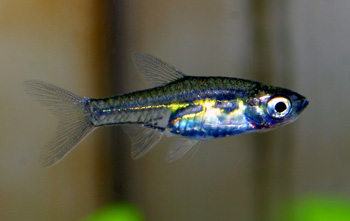
- Aquarium specimen in the United States

Conservation status
- Vulnerable (IUCN 3.1)

Scientific classification
- Kingdom: Animalia
- Phylum: Chordata
- Class: Actinopterygii
- Order: Cypriniformes
- Family: Danionidae
- Subfamily: Rasborinae
- Genus: Horadandia
- Species: H. atukorali

Binomial name
- Horadandia atukorali Deraniyagala, 1943

= Green carplet =

Species of fish

The horadandia, green carplet, or glowlight carplet (Horadandia atukorali), is a species of very small freshwater ray-finned fish in the family Danionidae, with the maximum total length being about 3 cm (1.2 in). This species is found in slow-moving or still freshwater and brackish habitats in western Sri Lanka, including coastal swamps and vegetated ponds.

The genus Horadandia was formerly considered monotypic, with the single species found in both Sri Lanka and India. However, a taxonomic revision published in 2013 demonstrated that Indian populations represent a distinct species. Hence, the species Horadandia brittani was described, restricting the range of H. atukorali to Sri Lanka.
