= Myxiops =

Scientific classification
- Kingdom: Animalia
- Phylum: Chordata
- Class: Actinopterygii
- Division: Teleostei
- Order: Characiformes
- Family: Acestrorhamphidae
- Subfamily: Stygichthyinae
- Genus: Myxiops; Zanata & Akama, 2004

Type species
- Myxiops aphos Zanata & Akama 2004

Genus of fishes

Myxiops is a genus of freshwater ray-finned fishes in the subfamily Stygichthyinae of family Acestrorhamphidae, the American tetras. The name is an allusion to the slime that the fish produces, from the Greek μύξα (mýxa), meaning "mucus". It was formerly monotypic, including only M. aphos, and both species were at some time allocated to its sister taxon of Deuterodon, before the genus was revalidated in 2024.

== Species ==
The genus currently includes the following valid species:

- Myxiops aphos Zanata & Akama, 2004
- Myxiops pelecus (Bertaco & C. A. S. de Lucena, 2006)
