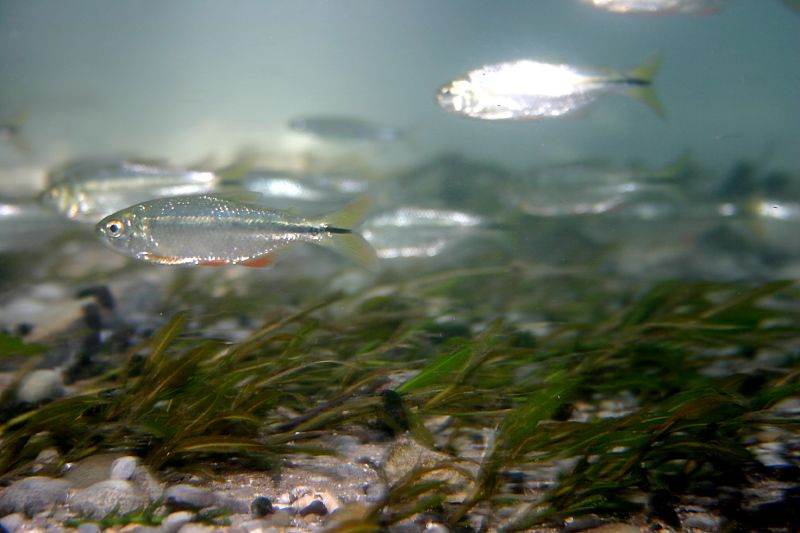

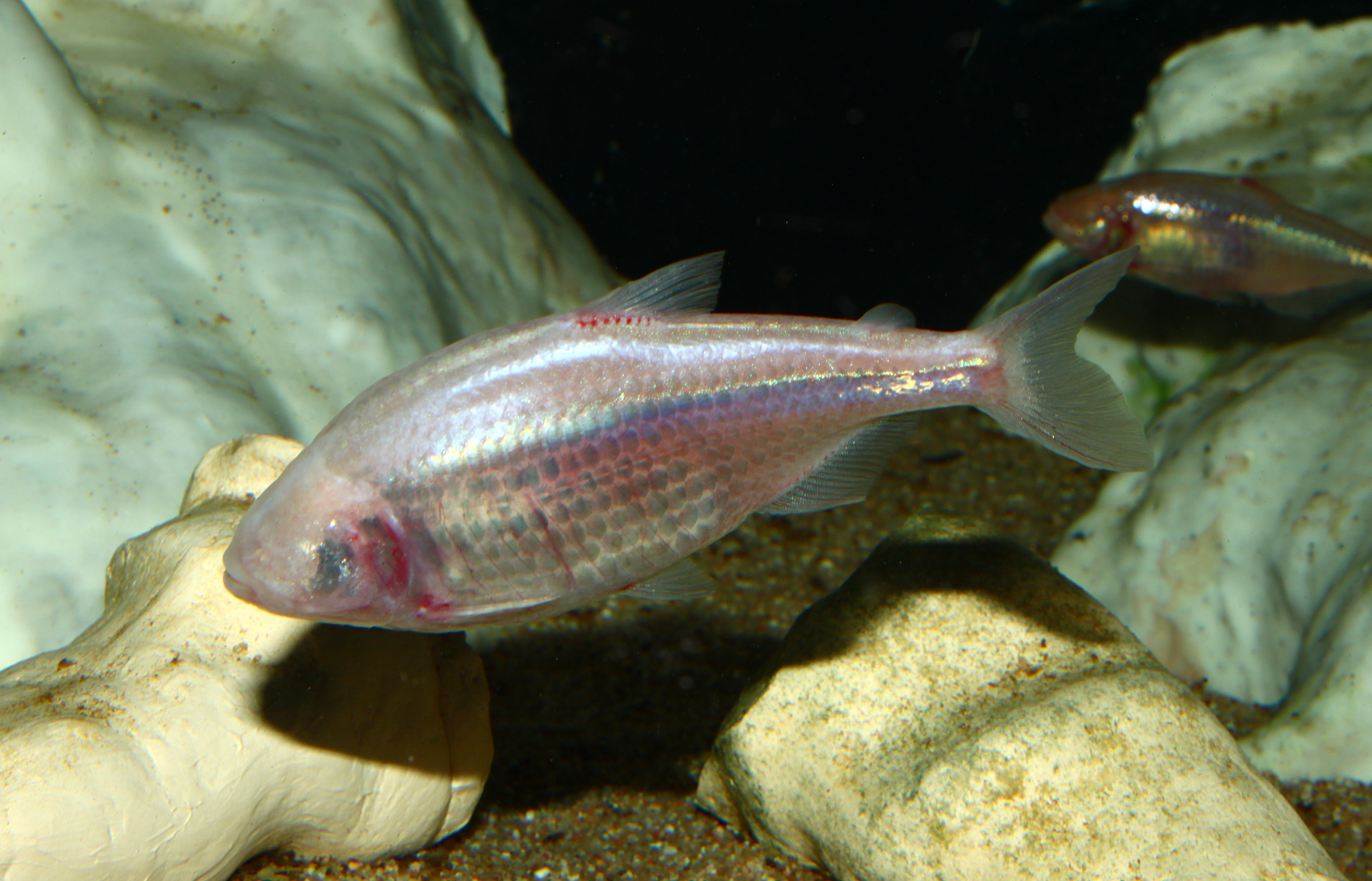
- Surface form (above) and blind cave form (below)

Conservation status
- Least Concern (IUCN 3.1)

- Vulnerable (IUCN 2.3) Cave form

Scientific classification
- Kingdom: Animalia
- Phylum: Chordata
- Class: Actinopterygii
- Division: Teleostei
- Order: Characiformes
- Family: Acestrorhamphidae
- Genus: Astyanax
- Species: A. mexicanus

Binomial name
- Astyanax mexicanus (De Filippi, 1853)
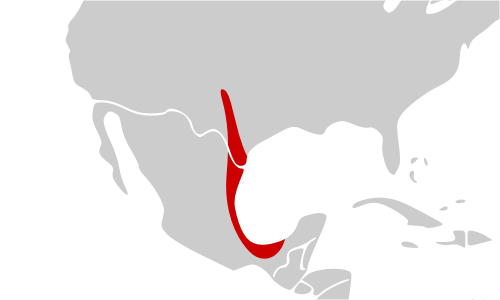
- Approximate range

Synonyms
- Tetragonopterus mexicanus De Filippi, 1853; Astyanax fasciatus mexicanus (De Filippi, 1853); Tetragonopterus fulgens Bocourt, 1868; Tetragonopterus nitidus Bocourt, 1868

= Mexican tetra =

Species of fish

The Mexican tetra (Astyanax mexicanus), also known as the blind cave fish, blind cave characin or the blind cave tetra, is a species of freshwater ray-finned fish belonging to the family Acestrorhamphidae, the American characins. This fish is found in the lower Rio Grande, and the Nueces and Pecos Rivers in Texas, into the Central Plateau and eastern states of Mexico.

Maturing at a total length of about 12 cm (4.7 in), the Mexican tetra is of typical characin form, albeit with silvery, unremarkable scalation, likely an evolutionary adaptation to its natural environment. By comparison, the species' blind "cave" form has scales which evolved a depigmented, pinkish-white color, somewhat resembling an albino, as it inhabits pitch-black caverns and subterranean streams and has no need for a colorful appearance (i.e. for attracting mates, camouflage, UV protection).

Likewise, the blind cave tetra has fully lost functionality of its eyes as a result of inhabiting an environment completely devoid of natural light, with only empty sockets covered with skin in their place. The blind tetra instead has highly developed sensory organs along its body, as well as a heightened nervous system (and senses of smell and touch), and can immediately detect where objects or other animals are located by slight changes in the surrounding water pressure, a process vaguely similar to echolocation—another adaptation known from cave-dwelling, as well as aquatic, species, such as the bats and cetaceans.

The Mexican tetra's blind variant has experienced a steady surge in popularity among modern aquarists.

A. mexicanus is a peaceful, sociable schooling species, like most tetras, that spends most of its time in midlevel waters above the rocky and sandy bottoms of pools, and backwaters of creeks and streams. Coming from an environment somewhere between subtropical climate, it prefers water with 6.5–8 pH, a hardness of up to 30 dGH, and a temperature range of 20 to 25 °C (68 to 77 °F). In the winter, some populations migrate to warmer waters. The species' natural diet consists largely of crustaceans, annelids and arthropods and their larvae, including both aquatic insects, such as water beetles, and those that land on or fall in the water, like flies or arachnids. It will also supplement its diet with algae or aquatic vegetation; in captivity, it is largely omnivorous, often doing well on a variety of foods such as frozen/thawed or live cultured blackworms, bloodworms, brine shrimp, daphnia, and mysis shrimp, among other commercially available fish foods.

The Mexican tetra has been treated as a subspecies of A. fasciatus, though this is not widely accepted. Additionally, the hypogean blind cave form is sometimes recognized as a separate species, A. jordani, but this directly contradicts phylogenetic evidence.

== Blind cave form ==
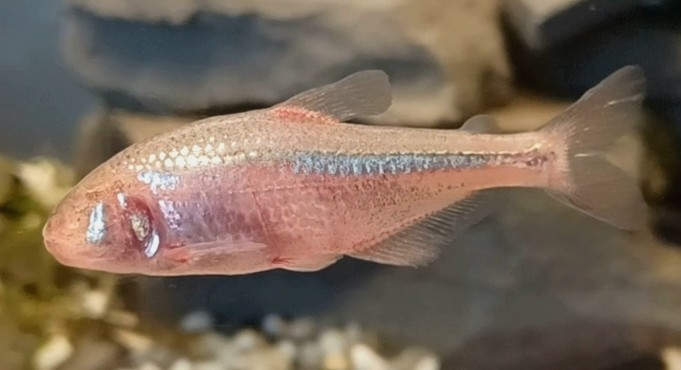
Blind cave fish form

A. mexicanus is famous for its blind cave form, which is known by such names as blind cave tetra, blind tetra (leading to easy confusion with the Brazilian Stygichthys typhlops), blind cave characin and blind cavefish. Depending on the exact population, cave forms can have degenerated sight or have total loss of sight and even their eyes, due to down-regulation of the protein αA-crystallin and consequent lens cell death. Despite profound eye degeneration, cavefish still respond weakly to light and show an endogenous circadian rhythm. During the start of development, larvae still exhibit a shadow response which is controlled by the pineal eye. The fish in the Pachón caves have lost their eyes completely whilst the fish from the Micos cave only have limited sight. Cave fish and surface fish are able to interbreed and produce fertile offspring.

These fish can still, however, find their way around by means of their lateral lines, which are highly sensitive to fluctuating water pressure. Blindness in A. mexicanus induces a disruption of early neuromast patterning, which further causes asymmetries in cranial bone structure. One such asymmetry is a bend in the dorsal region of their skull, which is propounded to increase water flow to the opposite side of the face, functionally enhancing sensory input and spatial mapping in the dark waters of caves. Scientists suggest that gene cystathionine beta synthase-a mutation restricts blood flow to cavefish eyes during a critical stage of growth so the eyes are covered by skin.

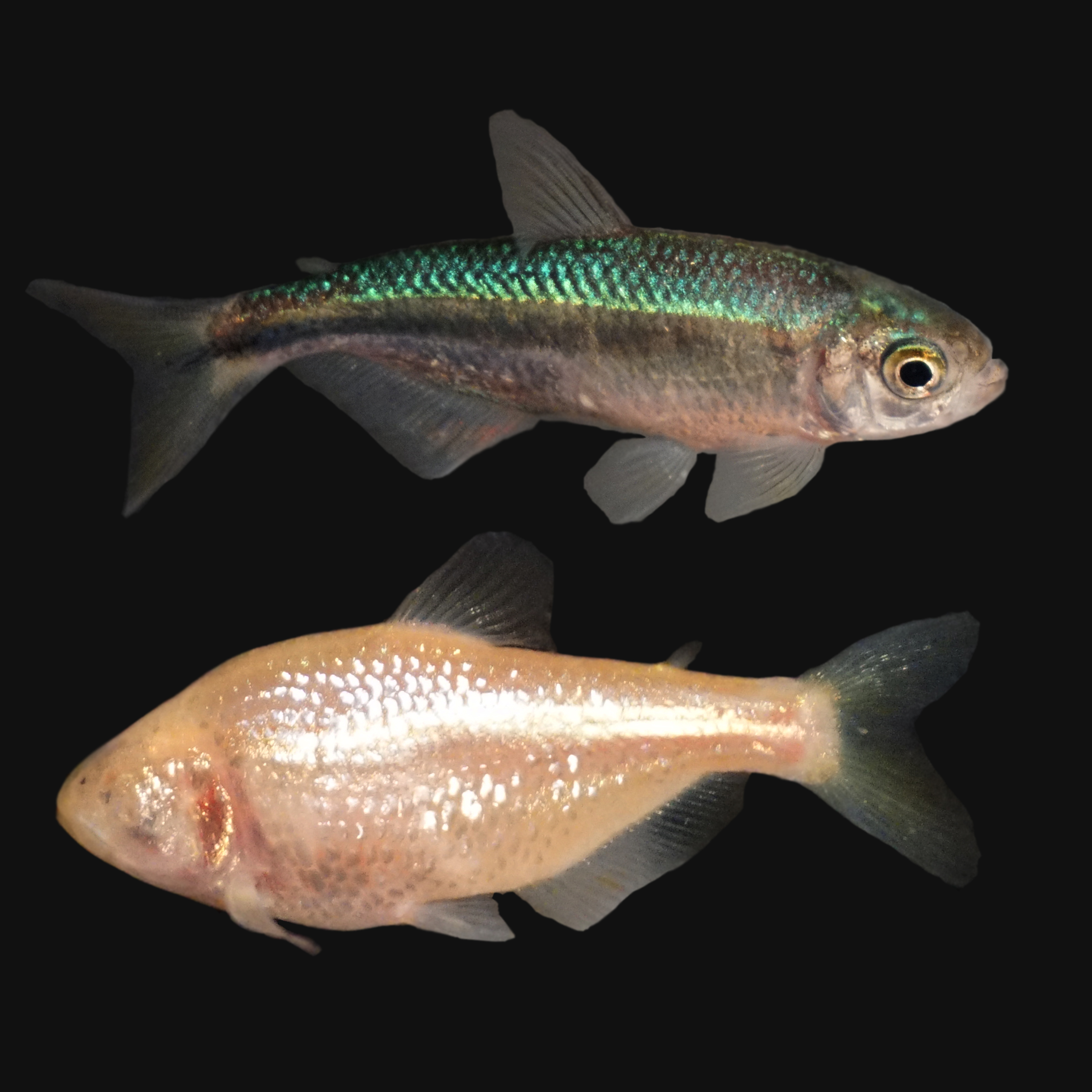
Surface form (top), cave form (bottom)

Currently, about 30 cave populations are known, dispersed over three geographically distinct areas in a karst region of San Luis Potosí and far southern Tamaulipas, northeastern Mexico. Among the various cave population are at least three with only full cave forms (blind and without pigment), at least eleven with cave, "normal" and intermediate forms, and at least one with both cave and "normal" forms but no intermediates. Studies suggest at least two distinct genetic lineages occur among the blind populations, and the current distribution of populations arose by at least five independent invasions. Furthermore, cave populations have a very recent origin (< 20,000 years) in which blindness or reduced vision evolved convergently after surface ancestors populated several caves independently at different times. This recent origin suggests that the phenotypic changes in cavefish populations, namely eye degeneration, arose as a result of the high fixation of genetic variants present in surface fish populations in a short period of time.

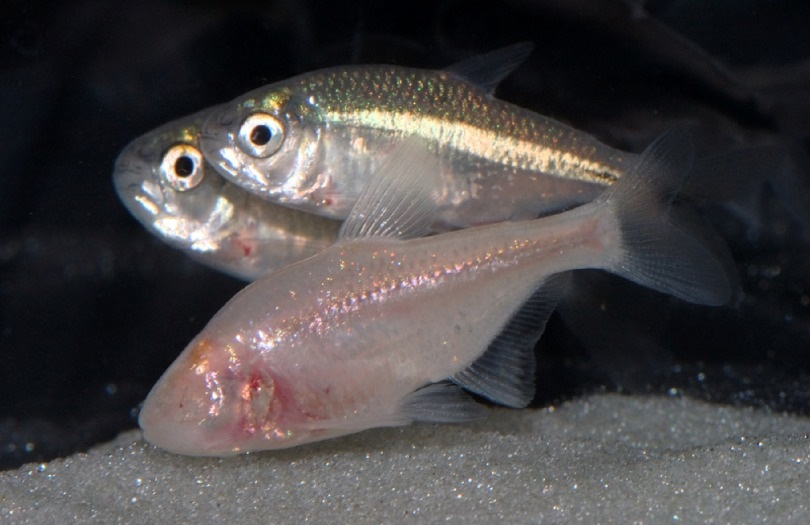
Cave and surface forms

The eyed and eyeless forms of A. mexicanus, being members of the same species, are closely related and can interbreed making this species an excellent model organism for examining convergent and parallel evolution, regressive evolution in cave animals, and the genetic basis of regressive traits. This, combined with the ease of maintaining the species in captivity, has made it the most studied cavefish and likely also the most studied cave organism overall.

The blind and colorless cave form of A. mexicanus is sometimes recognized as a separate species, A. jordani, but this leaves the remaining A. mexicanus as a paraphyletic species and A. jordani as polyphyletic. The Cueva Chica Cave in the southern part of the Sierra del Abra system is the type locality for A. jordani. Other blind populations were initially also recognized as separate species, including antrobius described in 1946 from the Pachón Cave and hubbsi described in 1947 from the Los Sabinos Cave (both subsequently merged into jordani/mexicanus). The most divergent cave population is the one in Los Sabinos.

Another cave-adapted population of Astyanax, varying from blind and depigmented to individuals showing intermediate features, is known from the Granadas Cave, part of the Balsas River drainage in Guerrero, southern Mexico, but it is a part of A. aeneus (itself sometimes included in A. mexicanus).

=== Evolution research ===
The surface and cave forms of the Mexican tetra have proven powerful subjects for scientists studying evolution. When the surface-dwelling ancestors of current cave populations entered the subterranean environment, the change in ecological conditions rendered their phenotype—which included many biological functions dependent on the presence of light—subject to natural selection and genetic drift. One of the most striking changes to evolve was the loss of eyes. This is referred to as a "regressive trait" because the surface fish that originally colonized caves possessed eyes. In addition to regressive traits, cave forms evolved "constructive traits". In contrast to regressive traits, the purpose or benefit of constructive traits is generally accepted. Active research focuses on the mechanisms driving the evolution of regressive traits, such as the loss of eyes, in A. mexicanus. Recent studies have produced evidence that the mechanism may be direct selection, or indirect selection through antagonistic pleiotropy, rather than genetic drift and neutral mutation, the traditionally favored hypothesis for regressive evolution.

A primary method of direct selection for the loss of eyes is through the energetic costs of maintaining eyes. Cave forms of the Mexican tetra have been shown to save a significant amount of energy due to their lack of eyes. In a cave environment where vision is not helpful, natural selection will have prioritized energy savings and therefore favored the fish without eyes, over time leading to eye degeneration.

Pleiotropy is hypothesized to be important in cave fish because there are genes that might be selected for one trait and automatically cause another trait to be selected for it if it is governed by the same gene. As selective pressure on one trait can coordinate change in others, pleiotropy could explain why independent adaptation to the cave environment has been observed in multiple populations of the species. One example is the relationship between taste bud amplification and eye loss controlled by sonic hedgehog expression (Shh) in cave fish. The Shh gene is expressed in higher levels in the cave form than in the surface form, and it has been shown that with an over expression of Shh there is an increased number of taste buds and reduced eye development. It is hypothesized that since caves are food and nutrient limited, having an increased amount of taste buds is important and may be under strong selection while at the same time causing evolution of eye loss.

The blind form of the Mexican tetra is different from the surface-dwelling form in a number of ways, including having unpigmented skin, having a better olfactory sense by having taste buds all over its head, and by being able to store four times more energy as fat, allowing it to deal with irregular food supplies more effectively.

Darwin said of sightless fish:

By the time that an animal had reached, after numberless generations, the deepest recesses, disuse will on this view have more or less perfectly obliterated its eyes, and natural selection will often have effected other changes, such as an increase in the length of antennae or palpi, as compensation for blindness.

— Charles Darwin, The Origin of Species (1859)

Modern genetics has made clear that the lack of use does not, in itself, necessitate a feature's disappearance. In this context, the positive genetic benefits have to be considered, i.e., what advantages are obtained by cave-dwelling tetras by losing their eyes? Possible explanations include:

- Not developing eyes allows the individual more energy for growth but not egg production. However the species does use other methods to locate food and detect danger, which also consume energy that would be conserved if it had eyes or transparent eyelids.
- There remains less chance of accidental damage and infection, since the previously useless and exposed organ is sealed with a flap of protective skin. It is unknown why this species did not develop transparent skin or eyelids instead, as some species of reptiles did.
- The lack of eyes disables the "body clock", which is controlled by periods of light and dark, conserving energy. However sunlight does have minimal impact on the "body clock" in caves.

Even if natural selection is positively acting to reduce eye growth, drift is still present.

Another likely explanation for the loss of its eyes is that of selective neutrality and genetic drift; in the dark environment of the cave, the eyes are neither advantageous nor disadvantageous and thus any genetic factors that might impair the eyes (or their development) can take hold with no consequence on the individual or species. Because there is no selection pressure for sight in this environment, any number of genetic abnormalities that give rise to the damage or loss of eyes could proliferate among the population with no effect on the fitness of the population.

Among some creationists, the cave tetra is seen as "evidence against" evolution. One argument claims this is an instance of "devolution"—showing an evolutionary trend of decreasing complexity. However, evolution is a non-directional process, and while increased complexity is a common effect, there is no reason why evolution cannot tend towards simplicity.

Inhibition of the HSP90 protein has a dramatic effect in the development of the blind tetra.

=== In the aquarium ===
The blind cave tetras seen in the aquarium trade are all based on stock collected in the Cueva Chica Cave in the southern part of the Sierra del Abra system in 1936. These were sent to an aquarium company in Texas, who soon started to distribute them to aquarists. Since then, these have been selectively bred for their troglomorphic traits. Today large numbers are bred at commercial facilities, especially in Asia.

The blind cave tetra is a hardy species. Their lack of sight does not hinder their ability to locate food. They prefer subdued lighting with a rocky substrate, like gravel, mimicking their natural environment. They become semi-aggressive as they age, and are by nature schooling fish. Experiments have shown that keeping these fish in bright aquarium set-ups has no effect on the development of the skin flap that forms over their eyes as they grow.

== See also ==
- List of freshwater aquarium fish species
