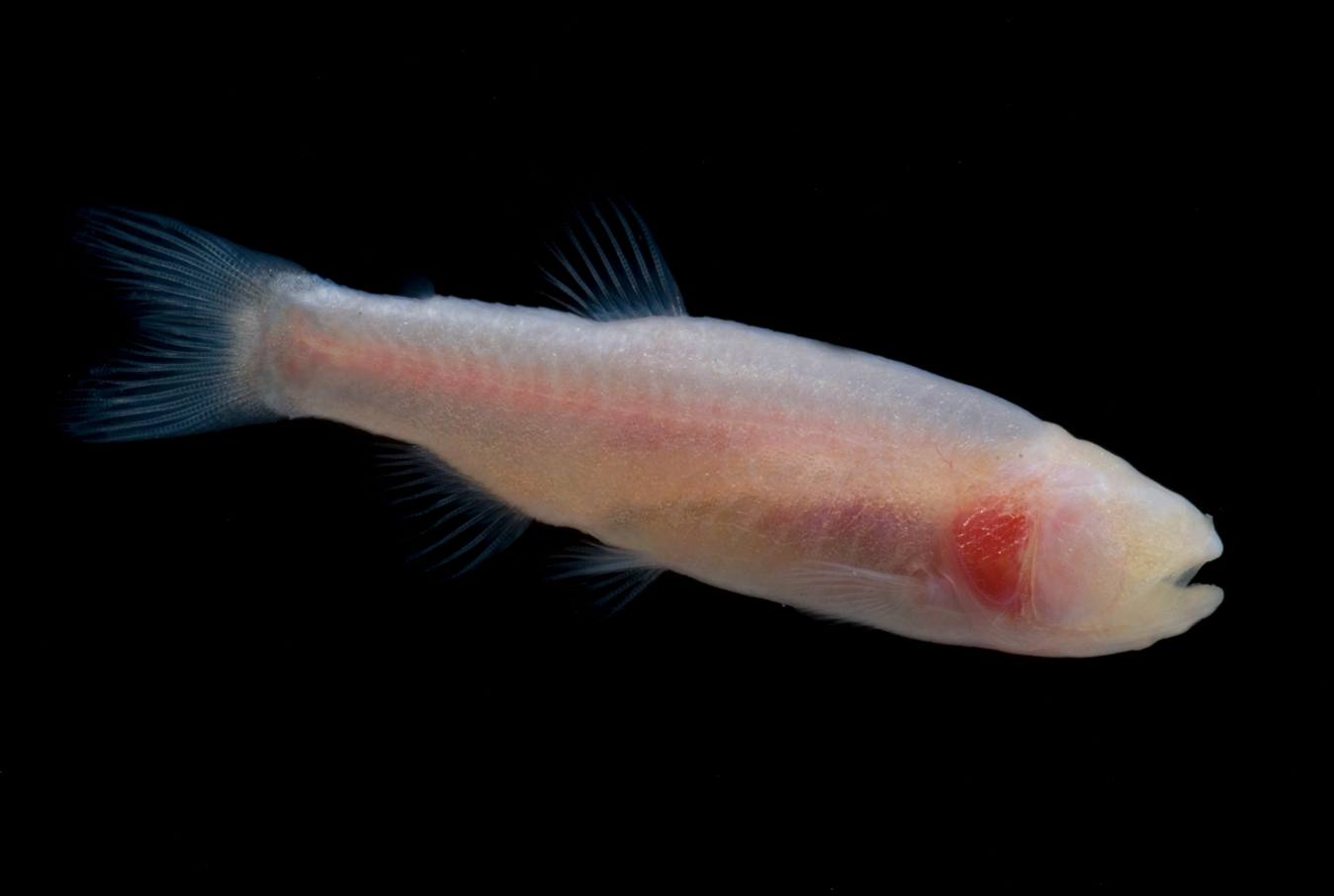

Conservation status
- Endangered (IUCN 3.1)

Scientific classification
- Kingdom: Animalia
- Phylum: Chordata
- Class: Actinopterygii
- Order: Characiformes
- Family: Acestrorhamphidae
- Subfamily: Stygichthyinae
- Genus: Stygichthys; Brittan & Böhlke, 1965
- Species: S. typhlops

Binomial name
- Stygichthys typhlops Brittan & Böhlke, 1965

= Stygichthys =

Genus of fishes

Stygichthys is a monospecific genus of freshwater ray-finned fish belonging to the family Acestrorhamphidae, the American tetras. The only species in the genus is Stygichthys typhlops. This taxon is endemic to caves in northern Minas Gerais, Brazil. Like other cave-adapted fish (e.g. the cave form of the Mexican tetra), the Brazilian blind characid is blind and lacks pigmentation. It reaches up to about 4.6 cm (1.8 in) in standard length. It is solitary and when kept together in an aquarium, individuals are indifferent to each other.

Initially only known from a specimen collected in 1962, it was rediscovered in 2004 by researchers led by the ichthyologist Dr Cristiano Moreira from the University of São Paulo. According to locals it was relatively common in the Jaíba region until the early 1990s, but generally not seen afterwards as extensive water extraction had significantly lowered the water table, resulting in many wells and springs drying out. This represents a serious threat to the continued survival of Stygichthys typhlops. It is recognized as an endangered species by Brazil's Ministry of the Environment.

Although there are many cave-adapted catfish species in mainland South America, there are only two known cavefish species from other orders: Stygichthys typhlops and the knifefish Eigenmannia vicentespelaea.
