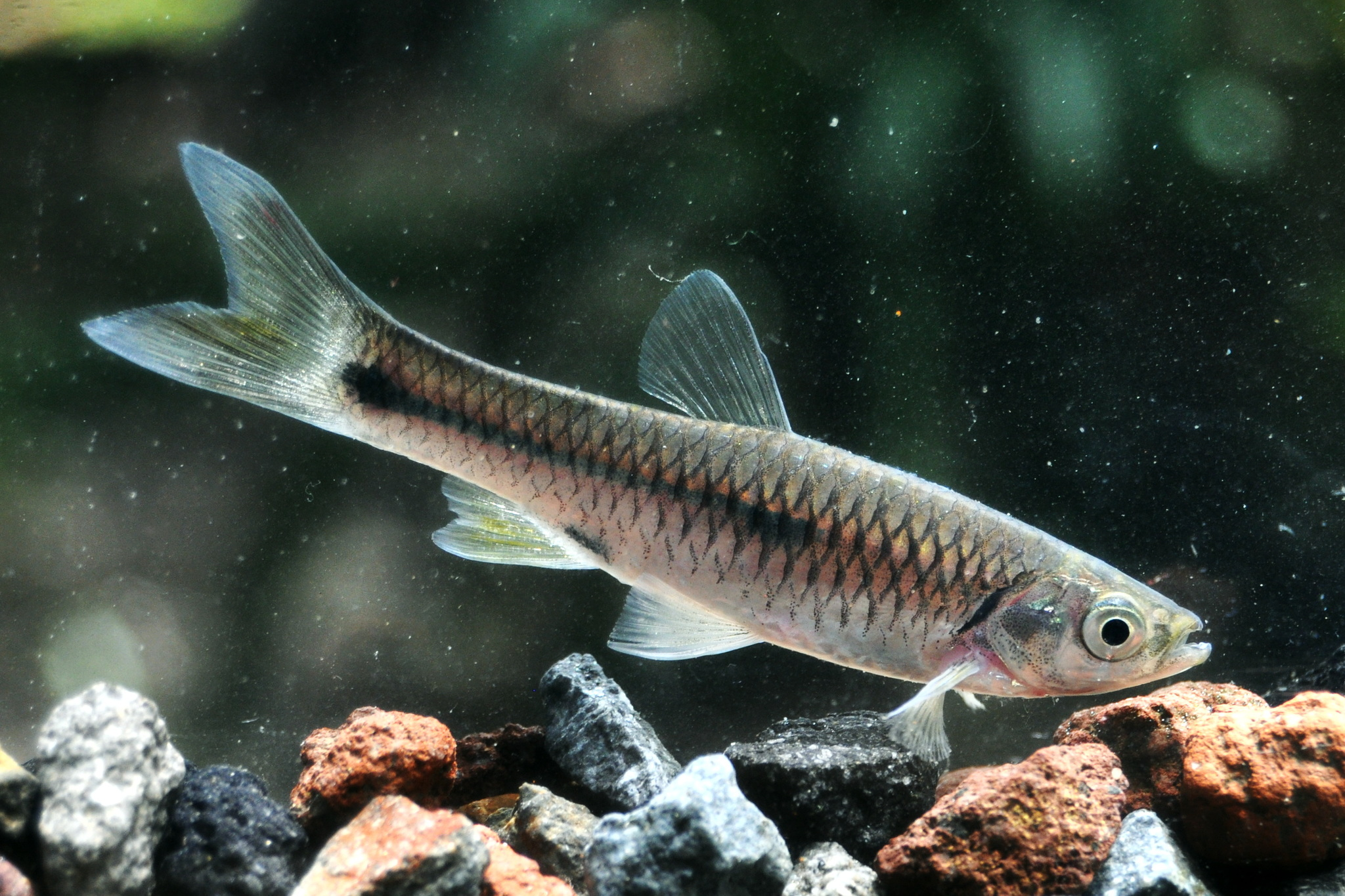

Conservation status
- Least Concern (IUCN 3.1)

Scientific classification
- Kingdom: Animalia
- Phylum: Chordata
- Class: Actinopterygii
- Order: Cypriniformes
- Family: Danionidae
- Genus: Rasbora
- Species: R. aprotaenia

Binomial name
- Rasbora aprotaenia C. L. Hubbs & Brittan, 1954

= Rasbora aprotaenia =

Species of fish

Rasbora aprotaenia is a species of freshwater ray-finned fish in the genus Rasbora. It is found in northern Java.
