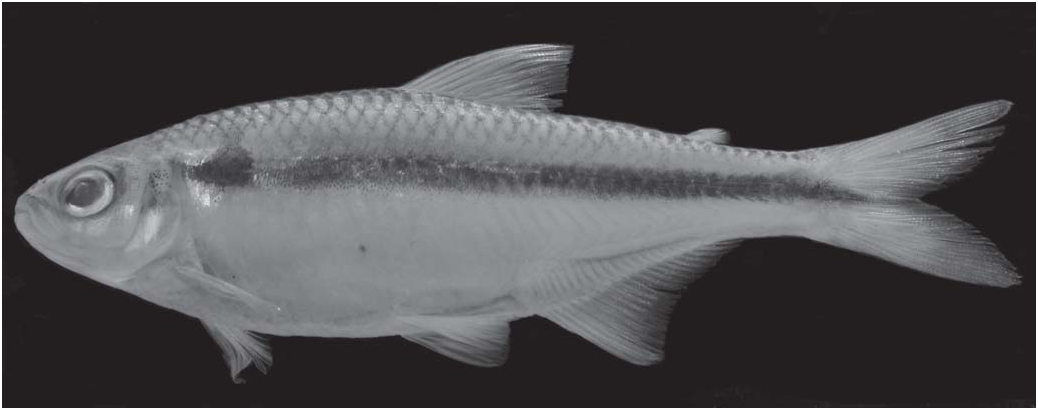
- Preserved holotype

Conservation status
- Least Concern (IUCN 3.1)

Scientific classification
- Kingdom: Animalia
- Phylum: Chordata
- Class: Actinopterygii
- Order: Characiformes
- Family: Acestrorhamphidae
- Genus: Myxiops
- Species: M. pelecus

Binomial name
- Myxiops pelecus (Bertaco & C. A. S. de Lucena, 2006, 2006)

Synonyms
- Astyanax pelecus Bertaco & C. A. S. de Lucena, 2006; Deuterodon pelecus (Bertaco & C. A. S. de Lucena, 2006)

= Myxiops pelecus =

Species of fish

Myxiops pelecus is a species of freshwater ray-finned fish belonging to the family Acestrorhamphidae, the American tetras. This species is found in Brazil.

It can be distinguished from other species by its body depth (26.7–34.8% of its standard length), its short and pointed snout smaller than the orbital diameter, and a reduced number of branched anal fin rays. M. pelecus also differs from other members of its genus by its characteristic color pattern. It possesses a single humeral spot that is constricted to the region above the lateral line; at the same time, it shows a conspicuous midlateral body stripe from opercle to the caudal fin base, an autapomorphy of this precise species. Other Deuterodon species have a humeral spot that is vertically or horizontally elongate, and have the midlateral stripe becoming faint near that humeral spot.

The species name is derived from the Greek pelekus, meaning "axe", referring to the pigmentation shape resulting from the adjoinment of the humeral spot with the midlateral stripe.

== Description ==
=== Morphology ===
Myxiops pelecus has a compressed and elongate body; the greatest body depth is located anterior to its dorsal fin's origin. The tip of the supraoccipital spine is straight or slightly convex. The profile of its body is convex from the tip of the aforementioned spine to the base of the last dorsal fin ray. The profile along the anal fin's base is posterodorsally slanted. Its caudal peduncle is elongate and almost straight along both margins (dorsal and ventral). Its snout is rounded from the margin of the upper lip through the anterior nostrils. Its head is small. Its lower jaw is shorter than the upper jaw. Its maxilla extends posteriorly to vertical through the anterior margin of the orbit, being aligned at an angle of about 45 degrees relative to the longitudinal body axis.

The premaxilla counts with two teeth rows: the outer row has 2–4 pentacuspid teeth with the central cusp being longer: five or six teeth in the inner premaxillary row. The teeth gradually decrease in length, the last two teeth being quite smaller. The maxilla counts with 1–4 teeth with 5–7 cusps, the central of which is the longest. The central cusp in all teeth is two to three times as long and broad as the other cusps. All cusps slightly curve towards the mouth's interior.

The fish possesses 9 dorsal fin rays. Its first unbranched ray is half of the length of its second ray. The distal margin of the dorsal fin is nearly straight, its origin being at the middle of the fish's standard length. The adipose fin is located at the insertion of the last anal fin ray. Anal fin rays range in number between 16 and 18. The distal border of the anal fin is smoothly concave. Its pectoral fin rays range between 11 and 13, while its pelvic fin rays equal 7. The tip of the pelvic fin reaches a posterior portion of the genital opening, rather falling short of the anal fin origin. The caudal fin finds itself forked, with lobes of equal size and possessing 19 principal rays. D. pelecus has 11 dorsal and 10 ventral procurrent rays.

The fish's scales are cycloid and moderately large. Its lateral line is a complete one. The number of scales in its lateral line series amount to 38–39, while its total vertebrae are 35. Its supraneural bones amount to 5, while its gill rakers range from 6 to 8. Secondary sex characteristics have not been found so far.

=== Colouration ===
In alcohol, the fish's dorsal and dorsolateral portion of the head and body are a dark brown colour. The dorsal portion of its body is darkly pigmented. The scales on its midlateral surface are bordered with dark brown chromatophores that form an overall reticulate pattern. Its snout and the anterior border of its eyes are darkly pigmented. Along the upper edge of its opercle to the base of its middle caudal fin rays extends a black midlateral stripe. Over the middle of its caudal fin rays there is a slight dark pigmentation. The animal counts with a single small humeral spot, which is sometimes obscured by the midlateral stripe mentioned before. Its fins show scattered dark chromatophores.

== Distribution ==
M. pelecus is known from the upper Rio Pardo, at Cândido Sales in the state of Bahia, eastern Brazil. During the dry season, the river is between 10 and 20 metres (33 and 66 ft) wide at the type locality, with clear water at depths of about 0.1 to 1.0 metre (0 to 3 ft) deep, with riparian vegetation. Its bottom consists of stones, sand, and mud. Myxiops pelecus cohabitates this ecosystem with Apareiodon itapicuruensis, Geophagus brasiliensis, Parotocinclus cristatus, and Hoplias, Characidium and Astyanax species.
