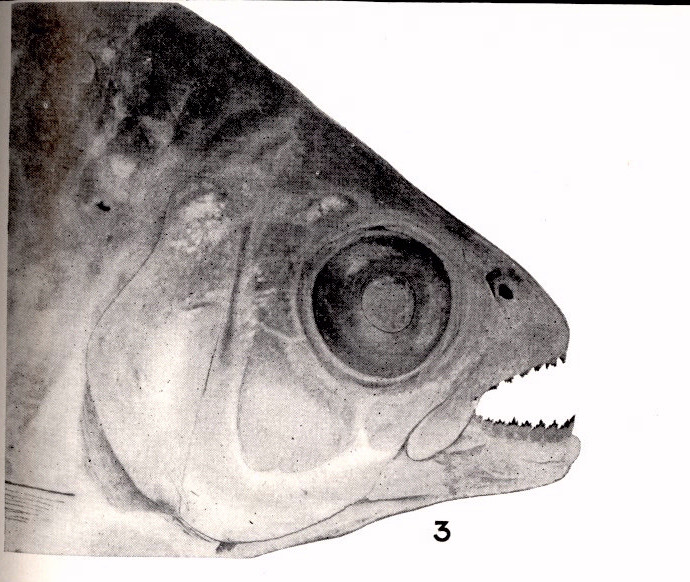
- Deuterodon iguape

Scientific classification
- Kingdom: Animalia
- Phylum: Chordata
- Class: Actinopterygii
- Order: Characiformes
- Family: Acestrorhamphidae
- Subfamily: Stygichthyinae
- Genus: Deuterodon; C. H. Eigenmann, 1907

Type species
- Deuterodon iguape C. H. Eigenmann, 1907

Synonyms
- Joinvillea Steindachner, 1908; Probolodus C. H. Eigenmann, 1911; Distoechus Gomes, 1947

= Deuterodon =

Genus of fishes

Deuterodon is a genus of characins from river basins in southern and southeastern Brazil (Rio Grande do Sul to Espírito Santo), with a single species of uncertain taxonomic status, D. potaroensis, from Guyana. These are small fish that reach up to 12.6 cm (5.0 in) in total length. They are omnivores with a specialized mouth structure that allows them to scrape algae and debris off bedrock.

Species formerly considered members of the genera Probolodus and Myxiops were considered to be members of Deuterodon by modern researchers, following a thorough phyletic review of several characid genera in 2020, though Myxiops was revalidated later.

== Species ==
Deuterodon contains the following valid species:

- Deuterodon burgerai (Zanata & Camelier, 2009)
- Deuterodon giton (C. H. Eigenmann, 1908)
- Deuterodon hamatilis (Camelier & Zanata, 2014)
- Deuterodon hastatus (Myers, 1928)
- Deuterodon heterostomus (C. H. Eigenmann, 1911)
- Deuterodon iguape C. H. Eigenmann 1907
- Deuterodon intermedius (C. H. Eigenmann, 1908)
- Deuterodon janeiroensis (C. H. Eigenmann, 1908)
- Deuterodon langei Travassos, 1957
- Deuterodon longirostris (Steindachner, 1907)
- Deuterodon luetkenii (Boulenger, 1887)
- Deuterodon mutator (C. H. Eigenmann, 1909)
- Deuterodon oyakawai (Santos & Castro, 2014)
- Deuterodon parahybae C. H. Eigenmann, 1908
- Deuterodon pedri C. H. Eigenmann, 1908
- Deuterodon ribeirae (C. H. Eigenmann, 1911)
- Deuterodon rosae (Steindachner, 1908)
- Deuterodon sazimai (Santos & Castro, 2014)
- Deuterodon singularis Z. M. S. de Lucena & C. A. S. de Lucena, 1992
- Deuterodon stigmaturus (Gomes, 1947)
- Deuterodon supparis Z. M. S. de Lucena & C. A. S. de Lucena, 1992
- Deuterodon taeniatus (Jenyns, 1842)
