= Gilbert Ichthyological Society =

The Gilbert Ichthyological Society is an unincorporated association of professionals and students serving to foster communication in the Pacific Northwest concerning all things ichthyological.

Gilbert Ichthyological Society logo, designed by Susan A. Point of Vancouver, British Columbia, Canada

== Origin and history ==
The Gilbert Ichthyological Society was resurrected in 1989 from the Gilbert Fisheries Society, a short-lived organization founded in 1931 at the then Department of Fisheries, University of Washington. The society is named for celebrated ichthyologist Charles Henry Gilbert (1859‒1928), who either by himself or as coauthor (most often with his mentor and later colleague David Starr Jordan) was responsible for the discovery and naming of approximately 117 new genera and about 620 new species of fishes, including about 25% of the fish fauna of Washington and Oregon. The first annual meeting of the Society was held on October 7, 1989, on the campus of the University of Washington in Seattle, and attended by 24 founding members from throughout the states of Washington and Oregon.

== Annual meetings ==
Since the first meeting in 1989, membership in the Society has grown to over 328 fellows. An annual meeting is held each year, alternating between locations in Washington and Oregon. The meetings provide opportunities primarily for graduate students to interact with their peers as well as with professionals in the fields of ichthyology and fishery biology. The organization also serves as a forum for students to present their first or early papers to an audience of their peers, thus offering valuable experience. A brief description of each meeting is published annually.
