= Carl D. Duncan =

American entomologist (1895–1966)

Dr. Carl Dudley Duncan (1895–1966) was a botanist and entomologist. Born in Dallas, Texas, Duncan taught at San José State College while receiving his graduate degree from Stanford University.

== Personal life ==
Born in Dallas, Texas on November 2, 1895, Duncan was educated in Fresno, California public schools. He entered Stanford in 1916, but left to serve in the U.S. Navy Hospital Corps, re-entering Stanford in 1919 and graduating in April 1923. He became a professor at San José State College from 1922 to 1950. While teaching at SJSC, Duncan attended Stanford University as a graduate student in the Biology department. During his time at Stanford, Duncan published a Masters thesis "A study of the generic characteristics of the North American wasps of the subfamily Vespinae, with notes on the biology of the Western species" in 1927. Duncan was well loved by his students, many of whom sought him as a mentor, including Patricia Whiting. Duncan hired Whiting to be a student secretary for the Field Studies program from 1964 to 1966. From 1950 until his retirement in 1965, Duncan served as the head of the Natural Science Department at SJSC, where he remained active with student programming, including hosting annual science camps in National Parks around California. Duncan was married to a folkdance teacher, Neva Williams, until her death in 1962. Both Duncan and his Wife, Neva, led the SJSC folk dance club, The Spartan Spinners.

== Education ==
Duncan studied at Stanford University between 1923 and 1931 while teaching botany and entomology at San José State College from 1922 to 1950. He is the author of "The World of Insects".
