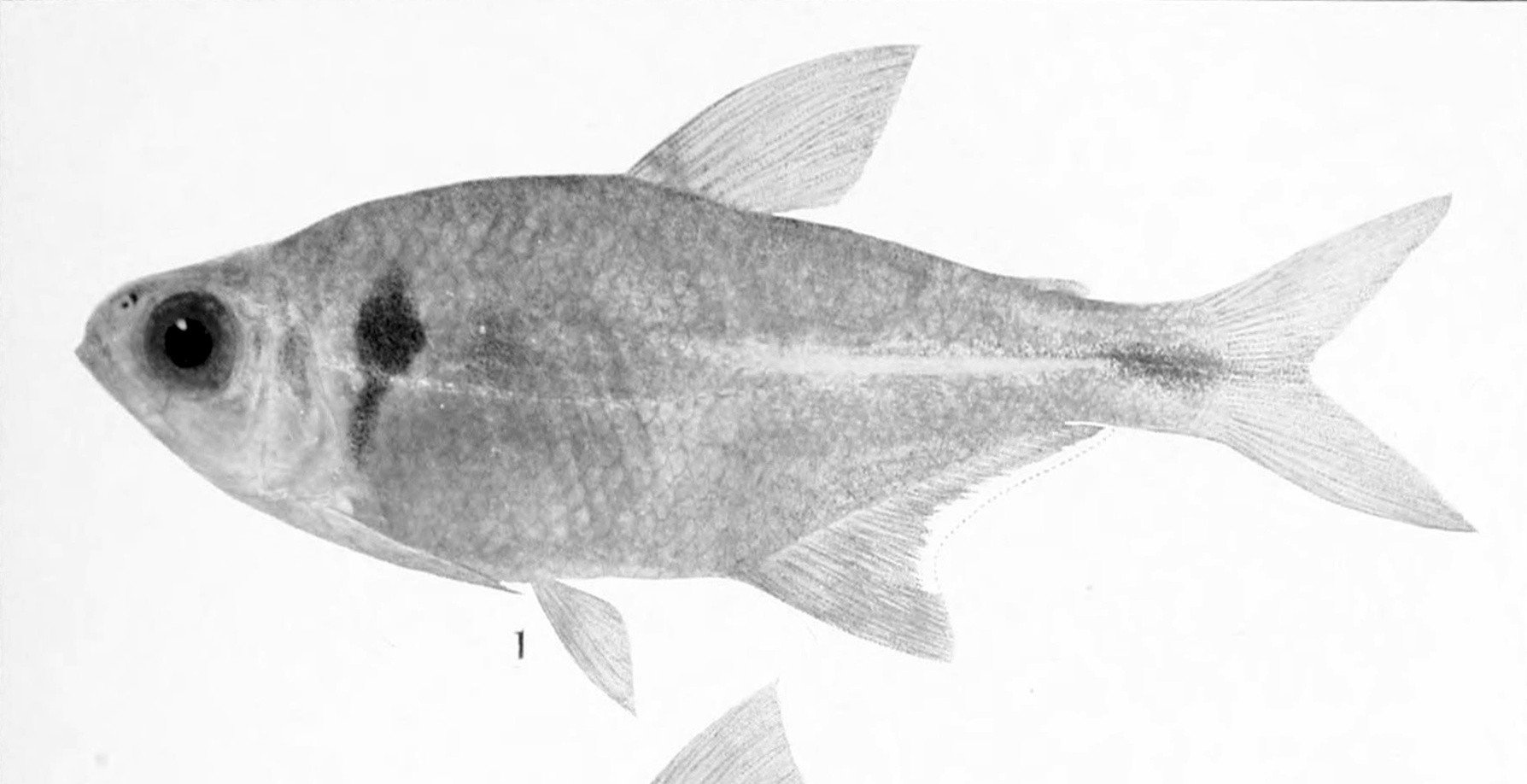
- 1911 illustration

Conservation status
- Least Concern (IUCN 3.1)

Scientific classification
- Kingdom: Animalia
- Phylum: Chordata
- Class: Actinopterygii
- Order: Characiformes
- Family: Acestrorhamphidae
- Genus: Deuterodon
- Species: D. heterostomus

Binomial name
- Deuterodon heterostomus (C. H. Eigenmann, 1911)

Synonyms
- Probolodus heterostomus C. H. Eigenmann, 1911

= Deuterodon heterostomus =

Species of fish

Deuterodon heterostomus is a small species of characin endemic to a large river system in southeast Brazil. It was originally the only member of the genus Probolodus, but Probolodus is now considered obsolete, synonymized with Deuterodon. Much like other members of Deuterodon, and like some fish in related genera, D. heterostomus is a small, silvery fish with fins in some combination of red and clear. It has a defined humeral spot that can be used for identification.

Its diet was not well-known until a 1970 study that classified it as a voracious lepidophage, preying on other fish species for their scales. Most of its food is sourced from related fishes such as Psalidodon fasciatus, a cryptic species to which D. heterostomus bears a strong visual resemblance. This resemblance has been proposed to be a form of mimicry, allowing D. heterostomus to easily approach its prey.

== Taxonomy ==
When originally described by German-American ichthyologist Carl H. Eigenmann in 1911, D. heterostomus went by the name Probolodus heterostomus. It was known as such for most of its existence as a species, and can still be found listed under the genus Probolodus in some databases, such as GBIF and the Encyclopedia of Life. However, the genera Probolodus and Myxiops were synonymized with Deuterodon in a 2020 study that closely examined the phylogeny of Astyanax and related groups, such as Psalidodon, Andromakhe, Makunaima, and Deuterodon itself. This updated classification is reflected in databases including FishBase, the World Register of Marine Species, and Eschmeyer's Catalog of Fishes.

Even before both species were reassigned to the same genus, D. heterostomus was known to be closely related to the then-monotypic Myxiops aphos (now Deuterodon aphos) and Deuterodon iguape.

=== Etymology ===
The genus name "Deuterodon" originates in Greek. Its roots are "deuteros", which means "second" or "repeated", and "odon", which means "tooth"; this is in reference to the similarity of all teeth in the lower jaw. The species name "heterostomus" is also from Greek, where "hetero" means "different" and "stomus" means "hole" or "mouth"; the original description noted peculiarity in the way the teeth point outwards.

== Description ==
Deuterodon heterostomus reaches a maximum of roughly 10 cm (3.9 in) SL (standard length, without the tail fin included). Most larger specimens are between 6 cm (2.4 in) and 8 cm (3.1 in) SL. The body is somewhat compressed and deep; this is more evident in smaller specimens, and body depth can vary between populations, though there is significant overlap between those located near each other. There are 45–56 scales in the lateral line, with 8–10 scale rows above it and 7–10 rows below. There are 11 total rays in the dorsal fin, 26–34 rays in the anal fin (rarely 35 or 36), 12–14 rays in the pectoral fin, 6–9 rays in the ventral fin (most often 8), and 19 rays in the caudal fin.

As early as the time of its description, D. heterostomus was noted to closely resemble Astyanax fasciatus, a cryptic species now known as Psalidodon fasciatus. Features include a silver base color and reddish fins, with the exception of the ventral and pectoral fins, which are clear. There is a large humeral spot, vertically elongated, that can be anywhere above the region between the 3rd and 5th scale of the lateral line. There is another spot on the caudal peduncle that continues onto the fin-rays in younger specimens; the ray pigmentation fades somewhat in adults.

=== Sexual dimorphism ===
Females are the larger of the two sexes, averaging 12 cm (4.7 in) longer than males when fully grown. Some larger males develop backwards-facing hooks on select rays of the pelvic fin when mature.

== Distribution and ecology ==
Deuterodon heterostomus can be found in the coastal river basins of southeastern Brazil. More specifically, it is known to occur in tributaries of the rio Paraíba do Sul basin. The region generally has a neutral water pH, ranging from 6 to 8, and various sites tend to have similar water temperatures, ranging from 22 to 25 °C (72 to 77 °F).

=== Diet ===
Deuterodon heterostomus is an omnivore, but most of its diet consists of the scales of other fish - a habit known as lepidophagy. This was first observed in a study of stomach contents from 1970; in 50% of examined specimens therein, scales were the only food item found in the stomach. Other specimens had eaten small seeds, microcrustaceans, and insects (plus insect larvae). Ichthyologist Ivan Sazima proposed in 1977 that the strong resemblance between D. heterostomus and P. fasciatus is a form of aggressive mimicry; because D. heterostomus looks like P. fasciatus, specimens of the latter are more likely to let the former get close, which would result in an easy source of scales for food.

== Conservation status ==
Deuterodon heterostomus has received an evaluation of Least Concern from the IUCN. It is a widespread species throughout its range, which indicates stability. It does, however, live in a region under ecological pressure from sources including pollution, drought, and municipal use.
